= Attack of the Cybermen =

137 – Attack of the Cybermen
- Doctor Who serial
- The Cybermen crush Lytton's (Maurice Colbourne) hands. The serial's violence, and the scene in particular, was heavily criticised by some reviewers.

Cast
- Doctor: Colin Baker – Sixth Doctor
- Companion: Nicola Bryant – Peri Brown
- Others: Maurice Colbourne – Lytton; Brian Glover – Griffiths; Terry Molloy – Russell; James Beckett – Payne; Jonathan David – Stratton; Michael Attwell – Bates; Stephen Churchett – Bill; Stephen Wale – David; Sarah Berger – Rost; Esther Freud – Threst; Sarah Greene – Varne; Faith Brown – Flast; David Banks – Cyber Leader; Michael Kilgarriff – Cyber Controller; Brian Orrell – Cyber Lieutenant; John Ainley – Cyberman

Production
- Directed by: Matthew Robinson
- Written by: "Paula Moore"
- Script editor: Eric Saward
- Produced by: John Nathan-Turner
- Music by: Malcolm Clarke
- Production code: 6T
- Series: Season 22
- Running time: 2 episodes, 45 minutes each
- First broadcast: 5 January 1985
- Last broadcast: 12 January 1985

Chronology
| ← Preceded by The Twin Dilemma | Followed by → Vengeance on Varos |

Attack of the Cybermen is the first serial of the 22nd season of the British science fiction television series Doctor Who, which was first broadcast in two weekly parts on 5 and 12 January 1985. It was credited to the pseudonymous author "Paula Moore"; the level of contributions made by Paula Woolsey, Eric Saward and Ian Levine have been disputed. It is the second and final serial to be directed by Matthew Robinson.

Set in London in 1985 and the planet Telos in the future, in the serial the Cybermen intend to change the course of history by destroying Earth with Halley's Comet in 1985, which would prevent the destruction of the Cybermen's original home planet Mondas.

Beginning with this serial and continuing for the remainder of Season 22, episodes were 45 minutes in length (as opposed to previous episodes which were 25 minutes long); for syndication, in some markets, this serial is re-edited into four 25-minute segments.

== Plot ==
The Sixth Doctor and Peri Brown are unsuccessfully attempting to fix the TARDIS, which is stuck in police box form, when it picks up a distress signal from Earth in the year 1985. The signal turns out to have been sent by Lytton, a mercenary formerly in the employ of the Daleks, who has since begun a new life as a London gangster. The three, along with Lytton's henchman Griffiths, are captured by the Cybermen in the city's sewers. They force the Doctor to fly the group in the TARDIS to the Cybermen-controlled planet of Telos, which the Doctor previously visited in his second incarnation.

The Doctor sabotages the TARDIS and it lands on Telos, but in the depths of the Cyber-Tombs, which have been sabotaged by Telos's native species, the Cryons. Peri, Lytton, and Griffiths escape when the group is attacked by a damaged, maddened Cyberman, and the Doctor is imprisoned with the Cryon leader, Flast, who tells him that the Cybermen intend to use a time ship that they have captured to prevent the destruction of their original homeworld, Mondas, by preemptively destroying Earth by rerouting Halley's Comet into it.

Lytton and Griffiths make contact with the time ship's original crew, Bates and Stratton, who turn out to have been failed victims of conversion into Cybermen. The group tries to retake control of the time ship, but Lytton is captured by the Cybermen, while Griffiths, Bates and Stratton are killed by a squadron guarding the time ship. Flast helps the Doctor prepare an explosion that will destroy the Cybermen's base before assisting him with escaping, but is executed by the Cybermen when they discover that the Doctor is missing. Peri, having been taken into the care of another group of Cryons, is re-united with the Doctor and informs him that Lytton had actually been working with the Cryons all along, in order to drive the Cybermen off Telos.

The Doctor lands the TARDIS in the Cybermen's control room, but finds Lytton almost fully converted into a Cyberman. The Cyber-Controller then arrives and prepares to kill the Doctor, leading to a firefight which claims the lives of several Cybermen including the Cyber-Controller and Lytton. Unable to do anything to help Lytton, the Doctor and Peri narrowly escape before the explosion the Doctor and Flast had earlier set up detonates, and completely destroys the Cyber-Tombs.

== Production ==
=== Writing and development ===
Following the positive response to Earthshock in 1982, which had seen the return of the Cybermen to the series for the first time in seven years, producer John Nathan-Turner contacted Gerry Davis, the co-creator of the Cybermen, to write a serial for Doctor Who for the first time since Revenge of the Cybermen (1975). Davis wrote a short story entitled Dr. Who and the Genesis of the Cybermen. Both Nathan-Turner and script editor Eric Saward believed the tone of the story did not align with the more recent seasons and rejected it. After the serial aired, Davis stated he was upset that production continued without him.

Author Marcus K. Harmes described Attack of the Cybermen as having a "complex plot". Both Harmes and Rob Hill of Den of Geek noted that the serial reiterates plot threads from previous Cybermen stories such as The Tenth Planet (1966) and The Tomb of the Cybermen (1967). It serves as a loose prequel to The Tomb of the Cybermen and The Invasion (1968). The serial contains commentary on the United Kingdom's then-loose gun restrictions.

The serial was the first and only that Paula Moore worked on. The serial is credited to Paula Moore, an alias for Paula Woolsey, though the extent of her contribution is debated. Saward either wrote or substantially rewrote the script. Various reasons have been cited for Moore being credited. It was either to prevent problems with the Writers' Guild of Great Britain, who objected to script editors editing their own scripts, or because Nathan-Turner refused to let Saward write season 22's debut story. Ian Levine, who had been consulted by the production team on contiuity, claims to have suggested a number of plot elements. Moore later wrote scripts for the following season, but they were abandoned after Doctor Who was placed on hiatus after season 22. In 2004, during an interview with Doctor Who Magazine, Saward said that he "effectively" wrote the script himself, incorporating Levine's story outline, with a "minor contribution" from Woolsey.

=== Filming ===
Attack of the Cybermen was directed by Matthew Robinson, who had directed the previous season's Resurrection of the Daleks. Nathan-Turner's first choice to direct the serial was Pennant Roberts, but due to scheduling conflicts Roberts turned his offer down. The production team modelled the sewer sets on the sewer system of Hyde Park, London.

According to Patrick Mulkern of Radio Times, Robinson "fought the lighting crew to keep the sewer scenes dark and effectively creepy". Filming began on 29 May 1984 before stopping on the first of June. It picked up again sporadically during late June and early July. Editing on the serial took place over ten days beginning on the 16 of July.

=== Casting and costuming ===
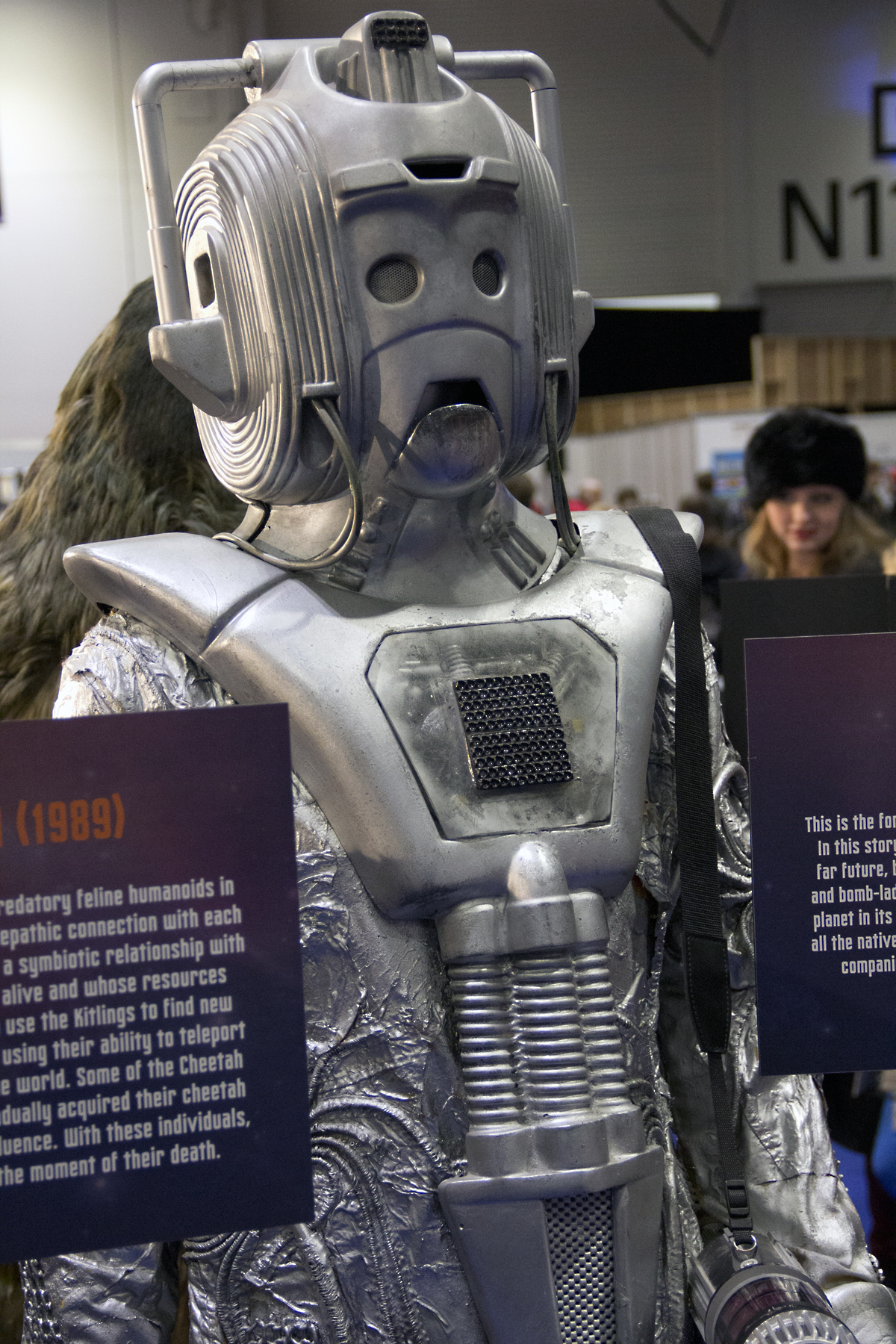
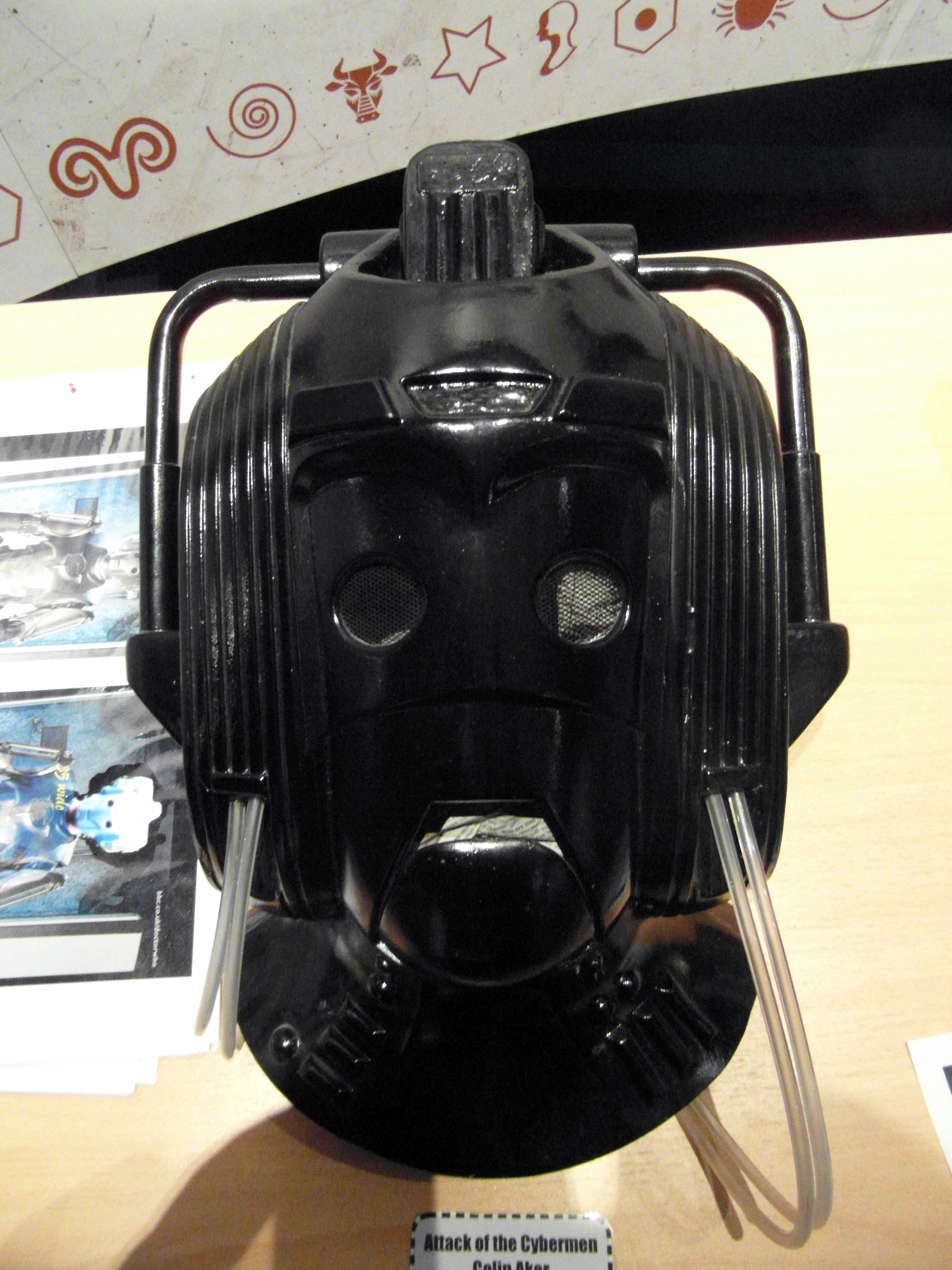
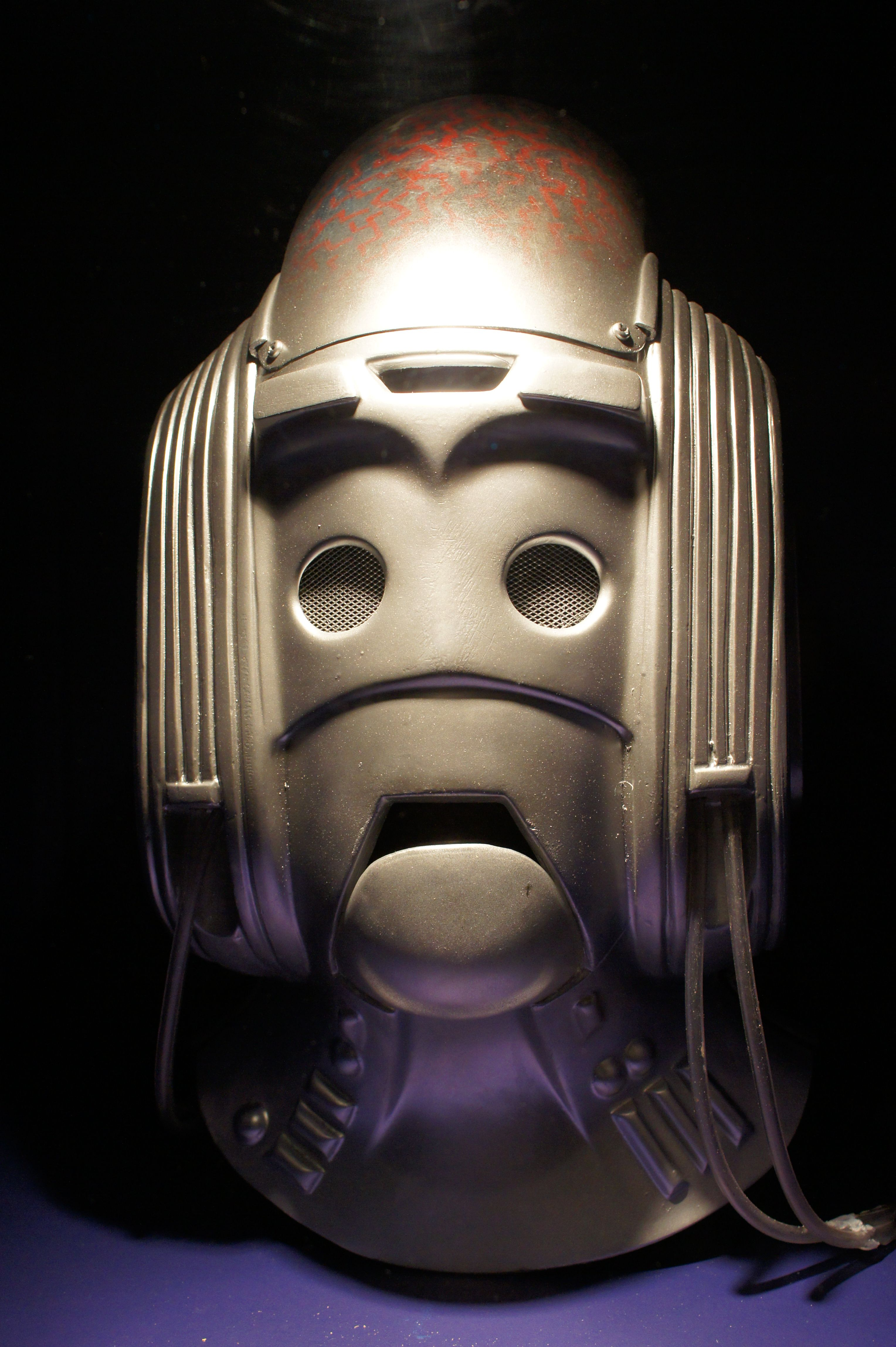
From left to right: A Cyberman, the helmet of a sewer Cyberman, and the helmet of the Cyber Controller as they all appear in the serial

The serial stars Colin Baker and Nicola Bryant as the Sixth Doctor and Peri Brown. In an effort to boost the viewing figures, Nathan-Turner hoped to cast a "big-guest star". Koo Stark was originally cast in the role of Varne, but following a dispute over her contract's terms she was fired. Sarah Greene, a former Blue Peter presenter who was a good friend of Robinson, was instead offered the role. Maurice Colbourne reprised his role as the mercenary Lytton from the 1984 serial Resurrection of the Daleks.

The Cryons were genderless in the script. However, Robinson was disappointed with the lack of female characters, so he had the idea to make them an all-female species. All Cryon masks were cast from the same mold. The mold was designed to leave the physical features of the actress visible. The make-up for the actresses portraying the Cryon's was difficult to apply. Greene noted that the costume made her claustrophobic. The Cybermen costume were the same ones used in "The Five Doctors", though the masks were remolded. Bryant kept her costume following the completion of the serial.

== Release ==
Attack of the Cybermen was the first serial to have episodes 45 minutes in length, as opposed to previous episodes which were 25 minutes long. The international releases of the serial were split into 25 minutes.

The repair to the TARDIS was in part a publicity effort by Nathan-Turner to drum up more interest in the series. He hinted that it might be a permanent development, but never pursued the idea beyond this story.

=== Ratings ===
| Episode | Title | Run time | Original release date | UK viewers (millions) | Appreciation Index |
|---|---|---|---|---|---|
| 1 | "Part One" | 44:17 | 5 January 1985 | 8.9 | 61 |
| 2 | "Part Two" | 44:29 | 12 January 1985 | 7.2 | 65 |

"Part One" achieved the highest viewing figures of any Sixth Doctor episode, at 8.9 million viewers. Additionally it was the highest viewed episode of Doctor Who since the 1982 serial Time-Flight. No other story reached 8 million or above for the remainder of Baker's run. The following episode was viewed by around 1.5 million viewers less.

=== Critical reception ===
Attack of the Cybermen was the first of several stories from this season to provoke controversy over its depiction of violence. In 1985, Australasian Doctor Who Fan Club president Tony Howe singled out the crushing of Lytton's hands until they oozed blood as being an instance of "sick, shock violence like Andy Warhol's" that was present for "cheap shock value only". Doctor Who: The Television Companion's own review of the story is similarly critical of the scene, describing it as a "gratuitous incident" which is "unnecessarily nasty and gory". It acknowledges some "saving graces", including Matthew Robinson's "polished direction" and Maurice Colbourne's return, who "manages to give a boost to every scene in which he appears", but states the story is "superficially exciting but it does not stand up to considered scrutiny or repeated viewing", describing it as "one of the most derivative stories that Doctor Who ever turned out".

For Den of Geek in 2010, Rob Hill ranked Attack of the Cybermen at number six in "the top 10 Cybermen stories", describing it as a "guilty pleasure" and "kitsch". He added that without background knowledge of Doctor Who the serial makes little sense. He described the plot as "almost a rehash" of The Tomb of the Cybermen and thought Lytton's motivations were unclear and made little sense. For the same website in 2021, Andrew Blair ranked Attack of the Cybermen at number 14 in the best Cybermen stories, stating that "a solid first episode gives way to a very poor second: there are good ideas here but there are also very bad ones and a hollow ending, resulting in something full of sound and fury but signifying nothing." He praised the dialogue and actors, including Baker's performance. Patrick Mulkern of Radio Times reviewed the story in 2012, awarding it two stars out of five. Mulkern stated that the story was not as bad as he remembered it to be and that there was "plenty of amusing lines and well-shot action", but made the same criticism of the difference in quality between the first and second episodes. Mulkern was critical of aspects of Peri's character and Bryant's inexperience as an actress, but enjoyed a "never less than entertaining, and often very funny" performance by Baker. He also concluded his review by stating "on balance Attack of the Cybermen is a brash start to season 22 that would benefit from another polish."

In the book Doctor Who: The Episode Guide, Mark Campbell awarded it three out of ten, describing it as "badly written and continuity-obsessed, with a predilection towards needless violence."

== Commercial releases ==
Attack of the Cybermen
- Author: Eric Saward
- Cover artist: Colin Howard
- Series: Doctor Who book: Target novelisations
- Release number: 138
- Publisher: Target Books
- Publication date: 20 April 1989
- ISBN: 0-426-20290-2

A novelisation of Attack of the Cybermen was written by Eric Saward and published by Target Books in April 1989. In 1995, the novel was released by BBC Audio as an audio book read by Baker. The book was one of the worst selling Doctor Who novelizations.

=== Home media ===
Attack of the Cybermen was set to be released by BBC Video on VHS in 1992 but due to low sales numbers with previous releases it was scrapped. It was ultimately released in November of 2000 as part of the "Doctor Who The Cybermen Box Set: The Tenth Planet and Attack of the Cybermen" double-tape set for its United Kingdom release. Although many serials from the 22nd season received a PG certificate from the British Board of Film Classification (BBFC) for their violent imagery, the BBFC gave a broader U rating to Attack of the Cybermen upon its 2000 VHS release. This decision has been criticised, due to the graphic scene of Lytton's crushed hands oozing blood.

The DVD version of "Attack of the Cybermen" was released on Monday 16 March 2009. The special features on the disc included a commentary featuring Baker, Bryant, Terry Molloy and Sarah Berger that was recorded on 26 June 2007, a making-of documentary featuring interviews with cast and crew. It was released as part of the "Doctor Who The Collection: Season 22" Blu-ray box set on 20 June 2022.

== Bibliography ==
- Ainsworth, John (2015). "Doctor Who – The Complete History: The Twin Dilemma, Attack of the Cybermen, and Vengeance on Varos". Doctor Who – The Complete History. Vol. 40. Panini Comics.
- Campbell, Mark (2010). Doctor Who: The Episode Guide (4th ed.). Pocket Essentials. ISBN 978-1842433485.
- Cook, Russell (13 October 2004). "Stormy Waters". Doctor Who Magazine. No. 348. Panini Comics.
- Fountain, Nev (September 2009). "Outside the TARDIS Nicola Bryant". Doctor Who Magazine. No. 412. Panini Comics.
- Harmes, Marcus K. (2014). Doctor Who and the Art of Adaptation: Fifty Years of Storytelling. Rowman & Littlefield. ISBN 978-1442232846.
- Howe, David J.; Walker, Stephen James (1998). "Attack of the Cybermen: Analysis". Doctor Who: The Television Companion. London: BBC Worldwide. ISBN 0-563-40588-0.
- Jones, Dallas (November 1991). "Gallifrey Guardian". Doctor Who Magazine. No. 180. Marvel UK.
- Marson, Richard; Russell, Gary (January 1985). "We Preview the 1985 Series of Britain's Top Fantasy Show". Doctor Who Magazine. No. 96. Marvel UK.
- Pixley, Andrew (August 1988). "Matrix Data-Bank". Doctor Who Magazine. No. 139. Marvel UK.
- Pixley, Andrew (November 1991). "Matrix Data-Bank". Doctor Who Magazine. No. 180. Marvel UK.
- Tulloch, John; Jenkins, Henry (1995). Science Fiction Audiences : Watching Doctor Who and Star Trek. London: Routledge. ISBN 0415061407.
