= Doctor Who season 22 =

1985 season of British sci-fi TV series

Doctor Who
- Season 22
- Cover art of the Blu-ray release for the complete season
- Starring: Colin Baker; Nicola Bryant; Patrick Troughton; Frazer Hines
- No. of stories: 6
- No. of episodes: 13

Release
- Original network: BBC1
- Original release: 5 January – 30 March 1985

Season chronology
- ← Previous; Season 21 Next → Season 23

The twenty-second season of British science fiction television series Doctor Who began on 5 January 1985 and ended on 30 March 1985. It opened with the serial Attack of the Cybermen and ended with the serial Revelation of the Daleks. The season returned to the traditional Saturday transmission for the first time since Season 18, but for the first and only time in the series' first run it featured 45-minute episodes in its entirety. During transmission, BBC1 controller Michael Grade announced an 18-month hiatus for the series, partly citing the violence depicted in the stories of the season. John Nathan-Turner produced the series with Eric Saward as script editor.

== Development ==
Several stories were considered for this season but ultimately scrapped. The first was Cat's Cradle, written by Marc Platt, which was deemed too ambitious for the show's budget and scrapped. Writer Andrew Smith pitched a story called The First Sontarans, which would have involved the Mary Celeste as well as the origins of the Sontaran and Rutan conflict. This was rejected due to the Sontarans' planned appearance in The Two Doctors. Other scrapped stories include The Guardians of Prophecy by Johnny Byrne, Leviathan by Brian Finch, The Macros by Ingrid Pitt and Tony Rudlin, and Volvok by Ian Marter.

== Casting ==
=== Main cast ===
- Colin Baker as the Sixth Doctor
- Nicola Bryant as Peri Brown
- Patrick Troughton as the Second Doctor
- Frazer Hines as Jamie McCrimmon

Colin Baker and Nicola Bryant continue their roles as the Sixth Doctor and Peri Brown.

Patrick Troughton and Frazer Hines return to play the Second Doctor and his companion Jamie McCrimmon in The Two Doctors. Their previous on-screen appearance had been (briefly in the case of Hines) in "The Five Doctors" in 1983.

=== Recurring actors ===
- Anthony Ainley as The Master
- Kate O'Mara as The Rani
- Terry Molloy as Davros

Ainley returns in The Mark of the Rani as The Master, and O'Mara makes her first appearance as The Rani in The Mark of the Rani.

Terry Molloy returns to play Davros in Revelation of the Daleks and also played Russell in Attack of the Cybermen.

=== Guest stars ===
Maurice Colbourne returned as Lytton from the story Resurrection of the Daleks in Attack of the Cybermen.

David Banks makes his third of four appearances as a Cyber-leader in Attack of the Cybermen.

Michael Kilgarriff reprises his role of the Cyber-Controller from The Tomb of the Cybermen (1967).

== Serials ==
The series moved back to once-weekly Saturday broadcasts. All episodes were 45 minutes long, though 25-minute edits were produced for foreign markets. Although there were now only 13 episodes in the season, the total running time remained approximately the same as in previous seasons since the episodes were almost twice as long.

No. story	No. in season	Serial title	Episode titles	Directed by	Written by	Original release date	Prod. code	UK viewers (millions)	AI
137	1	Attack of the Cybermen	"Part One"	Matthew Robinson	Paula Moore	5 January 1985	6T	8.9	61
137	1	Attack of the Cybermen	"Part Two"	Matthew Robinson	Paula Moore	12 January 1985	6T	7.2	65
The TARDIS is commandeered by the mercenary Lytton and a group of Cybermen, who are using another captured time machine to travel back to 1985. There, the Cybermen intend to use Halley's Comet to obliterate the Earth, thus preventing the destruction of their home planet Mondas in 1986 and perverting the course of history. Taken prisoner on Telos, the Doctor and Peri escape and ally themselves with the native Cryons. But in order to stop the Cyber plot, they may have to rely on none other than Lytton, whose motivations remain a mystery to all.
138	2	Vengeance on Varos	"Part One"	Ron Jones	Philip Martin	19 January 1985	6V	7.2	63
138	2	Vengeance on Varos	"Part Two"	Ron Jones	Philip Martin	26 January 1985	6V	7.0	65
When the TARDIS runs out of vital Zyton-7 ore, the Doctor makes an emergency landing on the planet Varos, which is rich in the mineral. Varos is a former penal colony whose residents now derive pleasure purely from the televised tortures which perpetually pass across their screens. The Governor of Varos is engaged in negotiations with the ruthless sluglike businessman Sil, who is trying to cheat the Varosians out of their rightful profit of Zyton-7. It is up to the Doctor and Peri to stop Sil's plans, and break the natives of Varos out of their daily cycle of video nasties.
139	3	The Mark of the Rani	"Part One"	Sarah Hellings	Pip and Jane Baker	2 February 1985	6X	6.3	64
139	3	The Mark of the Rani	"Part Two"	Sarah Hellings	Pip and Jane Baker	9 February 1985	6X	7.3	64
The TARDIS is drawn to Earth during the Luddite Uprisings. There, the Master is once again trying to alter the planet's history, while an evil Time Lady called the Rani is also present, extracting chemicals from the brains of local workers for her own use. As a result of the Rani's experiments, rioting amongst the workers is intensifying, threatening the work of famed engineer George Stephenson. It falls to the Doctor and Peri to foil the uneasy partnership between the two villains and restore Earth's history to its proper course.
140	4	The Two Doctors	"Part One"	Peter Moffatt	Robert Holmes	16 February 1985	6W	6.6	65
140	4	The Two Doctors	"Part Two"	Peter Moffatt	Robert Holmes	23 February 1985	6W	6.0	62
140	4	The Two Doctors	"Part Three"	Peter Moffatt	Robert Holmes	2 March 1985	6W	6.9	65
The Time Lords send the Second Doctor and Jamie to Space Station Camera, to put an end to temporal experiments being conducted by Dastari, an old friend of the Doctor's. Dastari has genetically augmented a savage Androgum named Chessene, who has forged an alliance with the Sontarans. They kidnap the Doctor and take him to a hacienda outside Seville, where they plan to isolate the genetic code which allows Time Lords to travel through the vortex. The Sixth Doctor and Peri rescue Jamie and follow the others to the hacienda, in a race against time with the Doctor's past and future at stake.
141	5	Timelash	"Part One"	Pennant Roberts	Glen McCoy	9 March 1985	6Y	6.7	66
141	5	Timelash	"Part Two"	Pennant Roberts	Glen McCoy	16 March 1985	6Y	7.4	64
The Doctor and Peri arrive on Karfel, which is ruled by an enigmatic tyrant known as the Borad who wields the power of a space-time tunnel called the Timelash. The Borad stokes the fires of war with Karfel's neighbours, the Bandrils. He plans to use the conflict to repopulate Karfel with beings such as himself: a hideously mutated cross between a human and a reptilian Morlox. And Peri will be but the first...
142	6	Revelation of the Daleks	"Part One"	Graeme Harper	Eric Saward	23 March 1985	6Z	7.4	67
142	6	Revelation of the Daleks	"Part Two"	Graeme Harper	Eric Saward	30 March 1985	6Z	7.7	65
The Doctor and Peri go to Necros to attend the funeral of an old friend of the Doctor's. There they discover that Davros is posing as the Great Healer of Tranquil Repose, a famed institution where the terminally ill can be placed in suspended animation until a cure for their ailment is found. Davros is experimenting on the comatose bodies to produce a new race of Daleks loyal to himself. To defeat his old foe, the Doctor may have no choice but to ally himself with the original Daleks on Skaro.

=== Supplemental episodes ===
A specially written segment produced for the BBC children's programme Jim'll Fix It featuring Colin Baker in character as the Sixth Doctor. It was broadcast on 23 February 1985. It is not generally considered to be canonical by Doctor Who fans (although a book in the Big Finish Short Trips series features a sequel to it).

Title	Directed by	Written by	Original release date
"A Fix with Sontarans"	Marcus Mortimer	Eric Saward	23 February 1985
The Doctor accidentally beams on board Tegan Jovanka and an Earthling called Gareth Jenkins, who happens to be dressed in an outfit similar to his own. They then have a short battle with two Sontarans.

== Broadcast ==
The entire season was broadcast from 5 January to 30 March 1985. Season 22 was the first season of Doctor Who to have 45–minute episodes instead of 25–minute episodes, and was also the first season to be broadcast on Saturdays since season 18.

== Home media ==
=== VHS releases ===
Season	Story no.	Serial name	Duration	Release date		
Season	Story no.	Serial name	Duration	UK	Australia	USA / Canada
22	137	Attack of the Cybermen	2 × 45 min.	November 2000	November 2000	November 2000
22	138	Vengeance on Varos	2 × 45 min.	May 1993	August 1993	June 1995
22	139	The Mark of the Rani	2 × 45 min.	July 1995	October 1995	February 1997
22	140	The Two Doctors	3 × 45 min.	November 1993	March 1994	June 1995
22	141	Timelash	2 × 45 min.	January 1998	September 1998	March 1998
22	142	Revelation of the Daleks	2 × 45 min.	November 1999	December 1999	February 2001

=== DVD and Blu-ray releases ===
All releases are for DVD unless otherwise indicated:

- ^{(B)} indicates a Blu-ray release

Season	Story no.	Serial name	Duration	Release date		
Season	Story no.	Serial name	Duration	R2	R4	R1
22	137	Attack of the Cybermen	2 × 45 min.	16 March 2009	7 May 2009	7 July 2009
22	138	Vengeance on Varos	2 × 45 min.	15 October 2001	7 January 2002	6 September 2005
22	138	Vengeance on Varos (Special Edition)	2 × 45 min.	10 September 2012	10 September 2012	11 September 2012
22	139	The Mark of the Rani	2 × 45 min.	4 September 2006	1 November 2006	7 November 2006
22	140	The Two Doctors (Note: Available individually or in the Bred for War box set in Regions 2 and 4. Only available individually in Region 1.)	3 × 45 min.	8 September 2003	7 January 2004	1 June 2004
22	141	Timelash	2 × 45 min.	9 July 2007	1 August 2007	1 April 2008
22	142	Revelation of the Daleks (Note: Available individually or in The Complete Davros Collection.)	2 × 45 min.	11 July 2005	1 September 2005	6 June 2006
22	137–142	Complete Season 22 (Note: Released as Doctor Who: The Collection – Season 22 in Region B. Released as Doctor Who – Colin Baker: Complete Season One in Region A.)	14 × 45 min. 2 × 50 min. 2 × 5 min.	20 June 2022 ^{(B)}	14 September 2022 ^{(B)}	18 October 2022 ^{(B)}

== In print ==
Season	Story no.	Library no. (Note: Number in Target's Doctor Who Library, if applicable)	Novelisation title	Author	Hardcover release date (Note: Published by Target's parent companies (Allen Wingate, W. H. Allen, BBC Books) unless otherwise indicated)	Paperback release date (Note: Published by Target Books (or by BBC Books under the Target Collection umbrella) unless otherwise indicated)	Audiobook	
Season	Story no.	Library no.	Novelisation title	Author	Hardcover release date	Paperback release date	Release date (Note: Unabridged from BBC Audio / AudioGo unless otherwise indicated)	Narrator
22	137	138	Attack of the Cybermen	Eric Saward	—N/a	20 April 1989	7 August 1995 (Note: Abridged)	Colin Baker
22	137	138	Attack of the Cybermen	Eric Saward	—N/a	20 April 1989	1 February 2024	David Banks
22	138	106	Vengeance on Varos	Philip Martin	21 January 1988	16 June 1988	3 November 1997	Colin Baker
22	138	106	Vengeance on Varos	Philip Martin	21 January 1988	16 June 1988	7 November 2019	Martin Jarvis
22	139	107	The Mark of the Rani	Pip and Jane Baker	16 January 1986	12 June 1986	5 April 2018	Nicola Bryant
22	140	100	The Two Doctors	Robert Holmes	15 August 1985	5 December 1985	3 September 2015	Colin Baker
22	141	105	Timelash	Glen McCoy	12 December 1985	15 May 1986	3 March 2022	Colin Baker
22	142	—N/a	Revelation of the Daleks	Eric Saward	14 November 2019	11 March 2021	14 November 2019	Terry Molloy (Note: Dalek voices performed by Nicholas Briggs)
