= Revelation of the Daleks =

142 – Revelation of the Daleks
- Doctor Who serial

Cast
- Doctor: Colin Baker – Sixth Doctor
- Companion: Nicola Bryant – Peri Brown
- Others: Eleanor Bron – Kara; Clive Swift – Jobel; William Gaunt – Orcini; John Ogwen – Bostock; Alexei Sayle – D.J.; Terry Molloy – Davros; Jenny Tomasin – Tasambeker; Stephen Flynn – Grigory; Bridget Lynch-Blosse – Natasha; Hugh Walters – Vogel; Trevor Cooper – Takis; Colin Spaull – Lilt; Penelope Lee – Computer Voice; Alec Linstead – Head of Stengos; John Scott Martin, Cy Town, Tony Starr, Toby Byrne – Daleks; Royce Mills, Roy Skelton – Dalek Voices; Ken Barker – Mutant

Production
- Directed by: Graeme Harper
- Written by: Eric Saward
- Script editor: Eric Saward
- Produced by: John Nathan-Turner
- Music by: Roger Limb
- Production code: 6Z
- Series: Season 22
- Running time: 2 episodes, 45 minutes each
- First broadcast: 23 March 1985
- Last broadcast: 30 March 1985

Chronology
← Preceded by Timelash	Followed by → The Trial of a Time Lord: The Mysterious Planet

Revelation of the Daleks is the sixth and final serial of the 22nd season in the British science fiction television series Doctor Who, which was first broadcast in two weekly parts on 23 and 30 March 1985. This was the final serial to be broadcast in 45-minute episodes; this format would return 20 years later when the series resumed in 2005. Revelation of the Daleks is the only time the Sixth Doctor encountered the Daleks in a television story.

The serial is set on the planet Necros. The galaxy is suffering from famine, but Davros (Terry Molloy) is masquerading as the Great Healer and has commandeered a funeral home, the high-tech facility Tranquil Repose, as a base from which he can convert humans into either food for the starving or into Daleks for his new secret army. However, his manufacturing ally Kara (Eleanor Bron) wants his business and has hired the assassins Orcini (William Gaunt) and Bostock (John Ogwen) to kill him.

== Plot ==
The TARDIS lands on Necros, the location of the funeral home Tranquil Repose. The Sixth Doctor is attacked by a mutant, which Peri kills. Before he dies, the mutant tells the Doctor that the Great Healer used him as a genetic experiment and his appearance and hostility were a result of the experiments.

At Tranquil Repose, a disc jockey plays songs and chats to entertain those who are in suspended animation. A couple, Natasha and Grigory, have illegally entered Tranquil Repose, looking for the man the Doctor is seeking—Arthur Stengos, Natasha's father. Upon finding his assigned suspended animation capsule, they discover it is empty. Shocked, they find a dark room filled with pulsating brains and other experiments. Grigory walks past a Glass Dalek casing with a mutating red creature inside it. Natasha realises it is the head of her father, and he is being metamorphosised into a Dalek.

Kara, who owns a company that distributes food, is a pawn of the Great Healer, in reality Davros. To dissolve this arrangement, she has hired the mercenary Orcini and his squire, Bostock. Orcini accepts the contract for the honour of killing Davros.

Arthur Stengos, who is now a head with red flesh growing over him, explains to Natasha and Grigory that the brains of a certain selection of bodies in Tranquil Repose are being used to metamorphosise into new Dalek mutants, while the rest are being used for a protein pack that Kara distributes as food. Moving in and out of moments of lucidity and Dalek-like hateful ranting, Stengos begs his daughter to kill him before he fully mutates. Natasha does, and then she and Grigory are captured and questioned by Takis and Lilt who are in charge of security.

The Doctor and Peri are met by Mr. Jobel and his subservient assistant Tasambeker. The Doctor sends Peri off with Jobel to meet the DJ while he digs into the situation. Orcini destroys a Dalek, and Davros is notified. He is convinced Kara has sent assassins, so he deploys Daleks to bring her to him. Tasambeker, who has been coerced by Davros to spy on Jobel, attempts to warn the Chief Embalmer out of misplaced love for him. When Jobel spurns her offer, Tasambeker fatally stabs him with a syringe. She is then exterminated by Daleks.

The Daleks capture the Doctor and throw him into a cell with Natasha and Grigory. They are then rescued by Orcini.

Orcini and Bostock arrive at Davros's laboratory. They attempt to kill Davros but fail, and Bostock is shot by a Dalek. Kara is then brought in, and betrays her motives to Davros. Orcini stabs Kara to death for lying to him, making good on an earlier threat if she was dishonest about her motives.

Natasha and Grigory fail to destroy the brains scheduled for metamorphosis and are killed by a Dalek. The Doctor tells Peri to hail the President's ship. Overhearing the transmission, Davros orders Peri captured after exterminating the disc jockey. The Doctor rushes to save her but is also caught. Both are taken to Davros's laboratory, where he reveals that he has created a new army of Daleks.

Daleks loyal to the Dalek Supreme arrive from Skaro, called by Takis who now realises what has been going on. Takis leads the grey Skaro Daleks to Davros's laboratory, where they are met by cream and gold Necros Daleks who are loyal only to Davros. A battle ensues, during which Davros's only usable hand is shot off by Bostock before the Daleks exterminate him. The grey Daleks then take Davros to Skaro to stand trial.

The wounded Orcini wants to detonate his bomb before Davros's ship leaves and refuses to use a timer. The Dalek ship takes off before the blast, however, but the Doctor states that Orcini died for something honourable: the destruction of Davros's new Daleks.

Takis complains to the Doctor that they are now all out of a job. The Doctor tells him that they can harvest the flowers that grow on the planet and use them as a new food source.

== Production ==
Eric Saward got around the BBC's policy against script editors commissioning stories from themselves by writing the script during a six-week period between his contracts. Saward was on holiday on Rhodes at the time and many of the names (such as Lilt and Orcini) come from places, products, and people he encountered there. The story is loosely based on the book The Loved One.

Despite the text on the DVD release stating that Soylent Green was an influence on Revelation of the Daleks, Eric Saward has said in the DVD commentary that he had not seen Soylent Green when he wrote it.

Eric Saward thought up the idea of blue 'mourning' suits for Necros in order to cover up Colin Baker's costume, which he considered inappropriate for a drama series. His was the final Doctor Who serial to be produced using film for outdoor sequences and video for interior scenes. Beginning with The Trial of a Time Lord, production moved to all-video. Colin Baker and Nicola Bryant appear entirely on film in Part One and have no interaction with the actors in the video segments.

=== Cast notes ===
Eleanor Bron appeared in a brief scene in the earlier serial City of Death (1979) alongside John Cleese as art critics in Denise Rene's art gallery in Paris. She also appeared in a Doctor Who radio drama, Loups-Garoux (2001), in which she played the wealthy heiress Ileana de Santos.

Colin Spaull later appeared in the Tenth Doctor story "Rise of the Cybermen"/"The Age of Steel" (2006) also directed by Graeme Harper. Clive Swift later appeared in the Tenth Doctor episode "Voyage of the Damned" (2007) as Mr. Copper. Trevor Cooper later appeared in the Twelfth Doctor episode "Robot of Sherwood" (2014) as Friar Tuck.

Penelope Lee, who played the voice of the computer, had in 1963 auditioned for one of the original four regular leads in Doctor Who, "Miss McGovern". She was offered the part, the name of which was subsequently changed to Barbara Wright, but decided to turn the role down.

== Broadcast and reception ==
Episode	Title	Run time	Original release date	UK viewers (millions)
1	"Part One"	44:31	23 March 1985	7.4
2	"Part Two"	45:27	30 March 1985	7.7

The story was repeated on BBC 2 in March/April 1993 on consecutive Fridays (19 March 1993 to 9 April 1993) in its 4-part version (sold for overseas transmissions) to represent the Colin Baker years in a series of repeats featuring the original seven Doctors. The episodes achieved viewing figures of 1.71, 1.8, 1.65 and 1.2 million, respectively. The scene where Jobel is stabbed to death with a hypodermic needle was one of several violent scenes that caused controversy during this era of Doctor Who. Australasian Doctor Who Fan Club president Tony Howe listed Jobel's death as one of several instances of "sick, shock violence like Andy Warhol's" that was present for "cheap shock value only".

Paul Cornell, Martin Day and Keith Topping gave the serial a positive review in The Discontinuity Guide (1995), saying that it "looks wonderful and the plot is just about consistent and straightforward." They praised guest stars William Gaunt and Alexei Sayle, as well as how the Sixth Doctor "finally gets to be Doctorish, with proper doses of compassion." In The Television Companion (1998), David J. Howe and Stephen James Walker also were positive, praising the guest stars, and reprinted positive fan reviews from the time. They did note that some viewers may not have liked the Doctor and Peri being sidelined, which could have resulted in the pace seeming slow. In 2012, Patrick Mulkern of Radio Times awarded the serial four stars out of five. He praised Graeme Harper's direction and called it "Saward's most accomplished script", though he believed it had a few structural problems. He also noted the amount of horror present, calling it a "gruesome thrill-ride". In Doctor Who: The Complete Guide, Mark Campbell awarded it eight out of ten, describing it as "an incredibly violent black comedy". He added, "Harper's direction is visceral, the actors are having a whale of a time and it's all held together by Roger Limb's spine-chilling music. The only thing missing is a plot."

Christopher Bahn, reviewing the serial for The A.V. Club, described it as "a grim, depressing slog", arguing that "Saward is simply not a strong enough writer to pull this off, failing to provide the clever dialogue, well-thought-out underlying concepts or basic plot mechanics that might have made this work, and also apparently actively hostile to the notion that anyone in Doctor Who, or watching it, should be having any fun." He wrote that the subplots were not handled well and many ideas were thrown around but not explored. Despite this, he praised Terry Molloy's performance as Davros as "the best version since Michael Wisher originated the role", some of Sayle's performance, and the realisation that Arthur Stengos was turned into a Dalek. DVD Talk's Stuart Galbraith gave the story two-and-a-half out of five stars. He found the black humour misplaced and not funny, and criticised the use of Davros and the Doctor, except for the climax. For Den of Geek in 2016, Mark Harrison was also not positive, stating, "In the style of all the worst Bond movies, the Doctor only comes face to face with Davros and the Daleks for a chin wag at the end of the two-parter before everything blows up. It's nobody's finest hour and aside from introducing an instantly iconic glass model, it's a cynical and contrived runaround that does nothing to embellish either the Daleks or the Doctor."

In A Critical History of Doctor Who on Television, John Kenneth Muir considered Revelation of the Daleks "yet another Doctor Who adventure of little distinction" with "nothing new or exciting in the story itself." He found Davros "tiring" and thought "by now the Dalek stories have become incredibly interchangeable." He regarded it as being "as competent as Resurrection of the Daleks, but that is hardly high praise."

== Commercial releases ==
=== In print ===
Doctor Who – Revelation of the Daleks
- Author: Eric Saward
- Series: Doctor Who novelisations
- Publisher: BBC Books
- Publication date: 14 November 2019
- Pages: 192
- ISBN: 978-1-785-94435-2

A fan group in New Zealand published an unofficial novelisation of the story in 1992, later republishing it online as an e-book titled Doctor Who: Revelation of the Daleks. An official novelisation by Eric Saward was published by BBC Books on 14 November 2019. A Target Books edition was published in paperback on 11 March 2021.

=== Home media ===
Revelation of the Daleks was released in 1999 on VHS together with Planet of the Daleks in a special Dalek tin set, and again in 2001 as part another box set, the WHSmith exclusive, The Davros Box Set. The stories were released on VHS individually in North America, and later released on Region 2 DVD on 11 July 2005.

Until recently the home media releases of this story contained a slight edit to remove the Jimi Hendrix Experience track Fire as played by the DJ, which was intact in original TV transmissions but cut from VHS and DVD releases due to copyright issues. For the VHS edition the soundtrack was edited to remove the Hendrix material leaving only the dialogue over which a piece of library guitar music was mixed loudly; for the DVD edition the original soundtrack was remixed to include another piece of library music with a flanging effect more sympathetic with that on the broadcast version. However, the Hendrix track was reinstated for the 2022 Season 22 blu-ray box set release (see below), so the story is now presented on home media in its original as-broadcast uncut version.

It was released as part of the ‘Doctor Who The Collection: Season 22’ blu-ray box set on 20 June 2022. An extended cut of Part One, running over a minute longer, was included as an extra on the set.
