= John Tulloch (disambiguation) =

John Tulloch (1823-1886) was a Scottish theologian.

John Tulloch may also refer to:

- John Tulloch (lecturer) (born 1942), lecturer and 7/7 survivor
- John Tulloch (rugby union) (died 1943), Scottish rugby union player
- John Walter Graham Tulloch (1861–1934), soldier
