= Vengeance on Varos =

138 – Vengeance on Varos
- Doctor Who serial

Cast
- Doctor: Colin Baker – Sixth Doctor
- Companion: Nicola Bryant – Peri Brown
- Others: Nabil Shaban – Sil; Martin Jarvis – The Governor; Forbes Collins – Chief Officer; Nicolas Chagrin – Quillam; Stephen Yardley – Arak; Sheila Reid – Etta; Jason Connery – Jondar; Geraldine Alexander – Areta; Graham Cull – Bax; Owen Teale – Maldak; Keith Skinner – Rondel; Hugh Martin – Priest

Production
- Directed by: Ron Jones
- Written by: Philip Martin
- Script editor: Eric Saward
- Produced by: John Nathan-Turner
- Music by: Jonathan Gibbs
- Production code: 6V
- Series: Season 22
- Running time: 2 episodes, 45 minutes each
- First broadcast: 19 January 1985
- Last broadcast: 26 January 1985

Chronology
| ← Preceded by Attack of the Cybermen | Followed by → The Mark of the Rani |

Vengeance on Varos is the second serial of the 22nd season of the British science fiction television series Doctor Who, which was first broadcast in two weekly parts on 19 and 26 January 1985.

The serial is set on the planet Varos, where the Sixth Doctor and Peri find themselves in a world in which torture and executions are broadcast to the public as entertainment, and the alien mining representative is extorting the planet's Governor into selling the valuable ore Zeiton-7 to his company cheaply.

== Plot ==
The Sixth Doctor and Peri travel to the planet Varos in search of Zeiton-7 ore in order to repair the TARDIS.

On Varos, the Galatron Mining Corporation's representative Sil (Nabil Shaban) is negotiating with Varos's Governor over the price of Zeiton-7 ore. The popular vote is against the Governor, and he is forced to please the citizens by ordering the execution of a rebel leader named Jondar.

The Doctor and Peri free Jondar and flee, meeting up with Jondar's wife Areta. The Doctor is separated from the others, who are arrested. With his attempt to escape now being broadcast as entertainment to all of Varos, he enters a corridor that appears in his mind as a desert, and due to its psychological effects, begins to die from thirst.

The Governor decrees that the Doctor and Jondar will be executed by hanging, while Peri and Areta are to be subjected to horrific scientific experiments. The four escape towards a possible escape route before Peri is recaptured and taken to the control centre.

The Chief Officer and Sil make their final move on the Governor in hopes that losing the next vote will finally kill him. The vote starts and the bombardment begins, but the guard Meldak has a change of heart and stops the device, saving the Governor and Peri. They all make their way back to the control centre as Sil reveals the invasion force he had dispatched hours earlier to take Varos by force. It is revealed that the invasion force has been called back, and a second Zeiton-7 deposit has been discovered, so his company has ordered him to obtain the Varosian ore at any price. The Doctor and Peri then bid the Governor farewell, taking some ore with them for the TARDIS. Soon after, the Governor issues a message to the citizens to abolish their government's injustice, torture, and executions.

== Production ==
Vengeance on Varos, was originally developed as a story including the Fifth Doctor, Nyssa, and Tegan Jovanka. However, over the course of development all three characters departed the series and it was retooled to feature the new Doctor and companion.

=== Filming ===
Vengeance on Varos was directed by Ron Jones. In his 1986 interview with Starburst, script editor Eric Saward said he thought this story was "poorly directed".

During the first recording of the noose execution scene, part of the set collapsed under the weight of the actors. Fortunately, this did not happen when Baker and Connery actually had their necks in the nooses (although, for safety the nooses were not actually tied up).

=== Casting ===
Jason Connery, son of actor Sean Connery, appears as Jondar. Martin Jarvis features as the beleaguered Governor of Varos; he had previously appeared in the series in a story in each of the previous two decades: The Web Planet (1965) and Invasion of the Dinosaurs (1974).

Stephen Yardley (Arak) previously played Sevrin in Genesis of the Daleks (1975). Owen Teale (Maldak) later appeared as Evan Sherman in the Torchwood episode "Countrycide" (2006) and also played Hayton in the audio play The Mind's Eye. Sheila Reid later played Clara Oswald's Grandmother in "The Time of the Doctor" (2013) and "Dark Water" (2014).

Nabil Shaban makes his debut as Sil. He would reprise the role in Mindwarp during the following season, which also introduces his home planet of Thoros Beta as well as other of his race.

== Broadcast ==
| Episode | Title | Run time | Original release date | UK viewers (millions) | Appreciation Index |
|---|---|---|---|---|---|
| 1 | "Part One" | 44:42 | 19 January 1985 | 7.2 | 63 |
| 2 | "Part Two" | 44:43 | 26 January 1985 | 7.0 | 65 |

Vengeance on Varos was released in two parts, released one week apart. "Part One" was viewed by 7.2 million viewers, the following part was viewed by 200 thousand less.

The international releases of the serial were split into four 25 minute episodes. The New Zealand release was heavily censored with over eight minutes of content being cut. The four part version was later aired on UK Gold.

=== Critical reception ===
Vengeance on Varos reflected the media's contemporary concern over video nasties and snuff movies, and provoked controversy for its violent content. The scenes featuring acid bath deaths, attempted hangings and genetic experiments on the female characters were widely criticised in the Radio Times letters page, and the programme Points of View. Unlike previous criticisms of the show's violence, this time complaints about Vengeance on Varos were raised by members of the general public and some of the show's fans, as well as traditional critics such as Mary Whitehouse.

Reviewing the story in About Time, Tat Wood described it as "like channel-zapping between a radical fringe theatre and children's television". He praised Martin's script and the story's production design, stating the story "gets more marks for effort than anything else this year". Wood also suggested that if someone wanted to understand what it was like to be living in Thatcher's Britain, they should watch Vengeance on Varos, then to "imagine a world where this could be followed by Jim'll Fix It". In Doctor Who: The Complete Guide, Mark Campbell awarded Vengeance on Varos six out of ten, describing it as "a brave idea, hindered by a plodding narrative and wooden performances". He also thought the "notorious acid bath scene" was "deeply problematic". Patrick Mulkern of Radio Times awarded it four stars out of five, describing Nabil Shaban's Sil as "one of the most effective new Doctor Who monsters in ages". He found that Jason Connery was "struggling through cumbersome dialogue" but believed there were "several weaker performances on display", though he praised Martin Jarvis as "graceful and suitably subdued". He was also critical of the acid bath scene, calling it "unfunny, unDoctorly and should have been changed at script stage". While describing Ron Jones as "not the greatest director", Mulkern believed it was "one of the more polished productions of his career".

== Commercial releases ==
=== In print ===
Vengeance on Varos
- Author: Philip Martin
- Cover artist: David McAllister
- Series: Doctor Who book: Target novelisations
- Release number: 106
- Publisher: Target Books
- Publication date: 21 January 1988 (Hardback) 16 June 1988 (Paperback)
- ISBN: 0-426-20291-0

A novelisation of this serial, written by Philip Martin, was published by Target Books in January 1988. It was originally planned to be released 2 years earlier, but was pushed back after delays in the delivery of the manuscript by Philip Martin. However, it kept its original number of 106. In addition, although Target had launched a new cover design format for the books with the previous volume, Time and the Rani, reflecting the new series logo of the Sylvester McCoy era, Vengeance on Varos was published with the earlier book cover format using the neon-tube logo of the Baker-Davison era.

In 1997 the novel was also issued by BBC Audio as an audio book, read by Colin Baker.

=== Home media ===
Vengeance on Varos was released on VHS in the UK in 1993 as part of the Doctor Who 30th Anniversary celebrations. It was released on DVD in the UK on 15 October 2001. The DVD commentary is provided by Baker, Bryant, and Shaban (Sil). This serial was also released as part of the Doctor Who DVD Files in issue 68 on 10 August 2011. A Special Edition DVD was released on 10 September 2012.

In 2013 it was released on DVD again as part of the "Doctor Who: The Doctors Revisited 5-8" box set, alongside Earthshock, Remembrance of the Daleks and the TV movie. Alongside a documentary on the Sixth Doctor, the disc features the serial put together as a single feature in widescreen format with an introduction from then showrunner Steven Moffat, as well as its original version.

It was released as part of the "Doctor Who The Collection: Season 22" blu-ray box set on 20 June 2022. An extended cut of the story, featuring almost sixteen minutes of previously unused footage, was included as a bonus feature.

=== Tales of the TARDIS ===
A special edition of the episode aired on BBC iPlayer on 1 November 2023, in the spin-off Tales of the TARDIS.

== Bibliography ==
- Ainsworth, John (2015). "Doctor Who – The Complete History: The Twin Dilemma, Attack of the Cybermen, and Vengeance on Varos". Doctor Who – The Complete History. Vol. 40. Panini Comics.
- Howe, David J.; Stammers, Mark; Walker, Stephen James (2005). The Handbook:The Unofficial and Unauthorised Guide to the Production of Doctor Who. Telos. pp. 640–2.
- Campbell, Mark (2011). Doctor Who: The Complete Guide. Robinson Publishing. ISBN 978-1849015875.
- Harmes, Marcus K. (2014). Doctor Who and the Art of Adaptation: Fifty Years of Storytelling. Rowman and Littlefield. ISBN 978-1442232853.
- Saward, Eric (September 1986). ""The Revelations of a Script Editor"". Starburst. No. 97.
- Wood, Tat (2007). About Time 6: Seasons 22 to 26 and TV Movie. Illinois: Mad Norwegian Press. ISBN 978-0975944653.
