= The Two Doctors =

140 – The Two Doctors
- Doctor Who serial

Cast
- Doctors: Colin Baker – Sixth Doctor; Patrick Troughton – Second Doctor
- Companions: Nicola Bryant – Peri Brown; Frazer Hines – Jamie McCrimmon
- Others: John Stratton – Shockeye; Jacqueline Pearce – Chessene; Laurence Payne – Dastari (Note: Also supplied the voice of the Space Station Camera Computer, uncredited.); Nicholas Fawcett – Technician; James Saxon – Oscar; Carmen Gómez – Anita; Aimée Delamain – Doña Arana; Clinton Greyn – Stike; Tim Raynham – Varl

Production
- Directed by: Peter Moffatt
- Written by: Robert Holmes
- Script editor: Eric Saward
- Produced by: John Nathan-Turner
- Music by: Peter Howell
- Production code: 6W
- Series: Season 22
- Running time: 3 episodes, 45 minutes each
- First broadcast: 16 February 1985
- Last broadcast: 2 March 1985

Chronology
← Preceded by The Mark of the Rani	Followed by → Timelash

The Two Doctors is the fourth serial of the 22nd season of the British science fiction television series Doctor Who, which was first broadcast in three weekly parts on BBC1 from 16 February to 2 March 1985.

The serial is set on an alien space station and in and around Seville. In the serial, the alien time traveller the Sixth Doctor (Colin Baker), his former travelling companion Jamie McCrimmon (Frazer Hines) and his current companion Peri Brown (Nicola Bryant) work to save the younger Second Doctor (Patrick Troughton) from the biogeneticist Dastari (Laurence Payne), who intends to steal the knowledge of how to travel in time from the Second Doctor's genetic make-up.

This serial marks Troughton's final appearance as the Second Doctor before his death in 1987.

== Plot ==
The Second Doctor and Jamie McCrimmon land the TARDIS on board Space Station Camera, where they talk to Dastari, the Head of Projects. The Doctor tells Dastari that the Time Lords want the time experiments stopped, but Dastari refuses. Also on board are the Androgums, a gluttonous alien species who are conspiring with the Sontarans to take over the station. The station's Androgum cook, Shockeye, drugs the crew's dinner to give the Sontarans an opportunity to invade. They take the Second Doctor prisoner, with Jamie escaping.

In the TARDIS, the Sixth Doctor has a vision of his second incarnation being put to death. He decides to consult his old friend Dastari to see if he can help. The Doctor and Peri arrive on the station and are attacked by the ship's computer, before they meet up with Jamie. The Sontaran ship lands in Seville, Spain, where the Androgums and Sontarans take over a local hacienda to use as a base of operations, with the Sixth Doctor following with Peri and Jamie.

Dastari reveals his plan to dissect the Second Doctor's cell structure to isolate his symbiotic nuclei and give them to Chessene, an Androgum technologically augmented to genius levels. Upon discovering there are two Time Lords present, Chessene asks Dastari to instead turn the Second Doctor into an Androgum, who will be able to use the TARDIS-based time module that Dastari has been building. The Sontaran leader, Stike tries to double-cross Chessene by stealing the module for himself, but she unleashes an acid bomb on the Sontarans first, and then Stike unwittingly blows himself up along with his ship.

Dastari implants the Second Doctor with a 50 per cent Androgum inheritance, but Shockeye, angered that his blood was used for the procedure without his consent, breaks the Second Doctor out before his change can be made permanent, and they go to a restaurant in Seville and order gargantuan amounts of food. When the restaurant's owner, Oscar, demands that they pay, Shockeye fatally stabs him, just as the Sixth Doctor and the others arrive. Shockeye leaves the Second Doctor, who slowly reverts to normal. Chessene and Dastari take them back to the hacienda at gunpoint.

The Sixth Doctor frees himself and kills Shockeye. Chessene sees the Doctor's blood and starts licking it. Dastari realises that no matter how augmented she may be, Chessene is still an Androgum, and decides to free the Second Doctor, Peri, and Jamie. When Chessene sees this, she shoots and kills Dastari. She tries to shoot the Second Doctor and Peri, but Jamie throws a knife at her wrist, making her drop the gun. Chessene goes into the module, hoping to escape, but the sabotaged module explodes, killing Chessene and reverting her back to her Androgum self. Jamie and the Second Doctor depart in their TARDIS, whilst the Sixth Doctor tells Peri they're both going on a vegetarian diet from now on.

== Production ==
Robert Holmes wrote the serial as an allegory about meat-eating, hunting and butchering. "Androgum" is an anagram of "gourmand".

Holmes's original brief from producer John Nathan-Turner was to write a serial taking place in New Orleans, but the setting had to be changed to Spain instead when the expected funding for location filming in the United States fell through.

In his 1986 interview for Starburst, script editor Eric Saward said he thought this story was "poorly directed".

=== Cast notes ===
This story marked the final appearance of Patrick Troughton as the Second Doctor and the final on-screen appearance of Frazer Hines as Jamie. Veteran actress Aimee Delamain appears in a cameo role as the ill-fated hacienda owner the Doña Arana. Laurence Payne appeared in the Season 18 debut The Leisure Hive and the Hartnell story The Gunfighters.

== Broadcast and reception ==
Episode	Title	Run time	Original release date	UK viewers (millions)
1	"Part One"	44:22	16 February 1985	6.6
2	"Part Two"	44:49	23 February 1985	6.0
3	"Part Three"	44:45	2 March 1985	6.9

The Two Doctors was one of several stories from this era to provoke controversy over its depiction of violence. In 1985, Australasian Doctor Who Fan Club president Tony Howe criticised the murder of Oscar with a kitchen knife as being an instance of "sick, shock violence" that was present for "cheap shock value only".

Patrick Mulkern of Radio Times awarded the serial two stars out of five, stating: "The Two Doctors wasn't dire, but the actors and audience deserved better." In Doctor Who: The Complete Guide, Mark Campbell awarded The Two Doctors seven out of ten, describing it as "a Doctor Who version of Last of the Summer Wine as sponsored by the Vegetarian Society." Television historian Marcus Harmes says of it "Besides the inherent joy of having Troughton and Hines back, the location filming around the hacienda and up and down the alleys in Seville is evocative, and the guest cast is brilliant".

== Commercial releases ==
=== In print ===
The Two Doctors
- Author: Robert Holmes
- Cover artist: Andrew Skilleter
- Series: Doctor Who book: Target novelisations
- Release number: 100
- Publisher: Target Books
- Publication date: 5 December 1985
- ISBN: 0-426-20201-5

The novelisation of this serial, by Robert Holmes, was published in hardback and paperback in August 1985 as the 100th Doctor Who release by Target Books. This was Holmes's only complete novelisation and seeks to clear up some of the continuity errors in the original broadcast. With a gold foil-embossed cover, it was billed on release as the 100th novelisation and featured an introduction by John Nathan-Turner.

=== Home media ===
As with several other mid-1980s Doctor Who stories, The Two Doctors received a PG rating from the British Board of Film Classification (BBFC) in 1993 for future home video releases, rather than the broader U often desired by the BBC. The BBFC were surprised by several moments which they felt imitated "[the] contemporary callousness of the Hollywood movie", such as Jamie lunging at Peri, which they felt could look worse taken out of context, as well as Shockeye eating a rat, the bloody death of Oscar and Jamie's stabbing of Stike, with the camera lingering on the latter for several seconds.

The Two Doctors was released on VHS in November 1993. It was released on DVD in the UK in September 2003 in a two-disc set as part of the Doctor Who 40th Anniversary Celebration releases, representing the Colin Baker years, with many extra features, including the Jim'll Fix It sketch A Fix with Sontarans. The DVD contains a full-length commentary provided by director Peter Moffatt and actors Colin Baker, Nicola Bryant, Frazer Hines, and Jacqueline Pearce. The DVD was subsequently incorporated into the box set Bred for War, along with The Time Warrior, The Sontaran Experiment and The Invasion of Time. Following the sexual abuse accusations regarding Jimmy Savile, the DVD was withdrawn from sale but has since been rereleased with the offending sketch removed. The BBC has made the serial available for download on Apple iTunes. It was released in issue 45 of Doctor Who DVD Files.

It was released as part of the ‘Doctor Who The Collection: Season 22’ blu-ray box set on 20 June 2022. An extended cut of Part One was included as an extra on the set with a runtime of 47:33, running 3 minutes and 11 seconds longer than the original broadcast episode.
