= David Banks (actor) =

British actor

- Born: 24 September 1951 (age 75); Hull, England, UK
- Occupations: Actor, writer, author

David Banks (born 24 September 1951) is an English actor, writer and author. He is best known for playing the Cyber Leader in the Doctor Who stories Earthshock (1982), "The Five Doctors" (1983), Attack of the Cybermen (1985) and Silver Nemesis (1988). As a theatre actor, he has played many leading roles in London and throughout the UK. He is also the author of several published books.

== Career ==
=== Acting ===
Banks's numerous television appearances include long-running portrayals in Brookside, playing the wrongly convicted murderer Graeme Curtis, and 181 episodes of L!ve TV’s drama series Canary Wharf as Max Armstrong, head of news, who was finally abducted by aliens. He also appeared in EastEnders in 1992, playing the photographer, Gavin, at Michelle Fowler's graduation ceremony.

During the 1980s, Banks played the Cyber Leader in the science fiction series Doctor Who in all stories featuring the Cybermen: Earthshock (1982), "The Five Doctors" (1983), Attack of the Cybermen (1985) and Silver Nemesis (1988). In 1989, he played the part of Karl the Mercenary in the stage play Doctor Who - The Ultimate Adventure, except for two performances when he appeared as the Doctor, replacing Jon Pertwee, who had fallen ill.

Banks writes and directs, and has worked extensively as a voice artist, recording over 100 audiobooks – including an unabridged version of J. R. R. Tolkien's The Lord of the Rings (Talking Books, 2006). In 2007, he revived his portrayal of Karl the Mercenary in a Big Finish Productions audio adaptation of Doctor Who - The Ultimate Adventure with Colin Baker as the Doctor. In 2018, he reprised his role as the Cyber Leader for the Big Finish audio story "Hour of the Cybermen" and again in 2019 for the audio story "Conversion".

=== Writing ===
Banks is the author of several published books. In 1988, he wrote Doctor Who – Cybermen, illustrated by Andrew Skilleter (Who Dares Publishing, 1988), which encompasses the history and conceptual origins of cybermen. He adapted the book into four audio cassettes, The ArcHive Tapes, which he also narrated. (These were re-released on CD in 2013 with bonus material by Explore Multimedia.) He later wrote the novel Iceberg (Virgin, 1993) for the Virgin New Adventures range of Doctor Who spin-off novels, which was set in 2006, when an inversion of the Earth's magnetic field is threatening to destroy human civilization, and featured the Cybermen and the investigative journalist Ruby Duvall.

His play Severance, about the 12th century lovers Abelard and Heloise, was first performed in 2002. In 2008, he was invited to deliver a paper about cyber emotions entitled "Life as an emotionless killing machine: Cybermen in a Strange State" by the Universities of Sydney and Melbourne. This paper references the recent reappearance of Cybermen on television after a long absence.

Other plays he has written and directed include Five Marys Waiting, a tragicomedy of grief and belief . He directed Jimmie Chinn’s Talking to John, Simon de Deney’s Between the Lines and, most recently, Four Quartets by T S Eliot. His production of Alan McMurtrie’s The Prisoner’s Pumpkin (Old Red Lion) won the London New Play Festival (LNPF) Best Play award in May 1992.

In 2026 Banks announced publication of a new book of his memoirs. Man and Cyberman: Memoirs of a Cyberleader was published in September 2026 by Telos Publishing Ltd.

=== Software Development ===
Banks is the strategic development director of Agentfile, a suite of management software intended for acting and voice Agents. Agentfile streamlines repetitive tasks and is managed within one single system. Functions include: storage and retrieval of all client data; GDPR & HMRC compliant; handles commission & VAT; is confidential & secure; is locally hosted so can work when broadband is down.

== Filmography ==
=== Television ===
Year	Title	Role	Notes
1979	The Cuckoo Waltz	PC Dave	Granada Television (Episode: The Press Ball)
1980	Keep it in the Family	Leslie	Thames Television (Episode: The Mouthtrap)
1982	Earthshock	Cyber Leader	BBC TV Doctor Who
1983	Man of Letters	Dennis O’Donovan	BBC TV Play for Today
1983	"The Five Doctors"	Cyber Leader	BBC TV Doctor Who 20th Anniversary Special
1985	Attack of the Cybermen	Cyber Leader	BBC TV Doctor Who
1988	Silver Nemesis	Cyber Leader	BBC TV Doctor Who
1991	The Bill	DI Graveny	ITV (Episode: Caught Napping)
1991-1992	Brookside	Graeme Curtis	Channel 4 (22 episodes)
1992	A Time to Dance	Ray	BBC TV mini series
1994	EastEnders	Gavin	BBC TV soap opera
1995	Death in the Playground	Derek Wakeley	BBC TV Rough Justice
1995	Going Under	Dennis Smalley	BBC TV Crimewatch Special
1996	Canary Wharf	Max Armstrong	L!VE TV soap opera (186 episodes)
2006	Doctors	Inspector Headley	Thames Television soap opera (Episode: Beat)
