= Sixth Doctor =

Fictional character from Doctor Who

The Doctor
The Sixth Doctor
- Doctor Who character
- Colin Baker as the Sixth Doctor
- First regular appearance: The Twin Dilemma (1984)
- Last regular appearance: The Ultimate Foe (1986)
- Introduced by: John Nathan-Turner
- Portrayed by: Colin Baker
- Preceded by: Peter Davison (Fifth Doctor)
- Succeeded by: Sylvester McCoy (Seventh Doctor)

Information
- Tenure: 22 March 1984 – 6 December 1986
- No of series: 2 (Note: Although appearing at the end of season 21 in both The Caves of Androzani (1984) and The Twin Dilemma (1984), it is commonly accepted the Sixth Doctor only had two full seasons in his tenure.)
- Appearances: 8 stories (31 episodes)
- Companions: Peri Brown; Jamie McCrimmon; Mel Bush
- Chronology: Season 21 (1984); Season 22 (1985); Season 23 (1986); Specials (2022)

The Sixth Doctor is an incarnation of the Doctor, the protagonist of the British science fiction television series Doctor Who. He is portrayed by Colin Baker. Within the series' narrative, the Doctor is a centuries-old alien Time Lord from the planet Gallifrey who travels in time and space in the TARDIS, frequently with companions. At the end of life, the Doctor regenerates; as a result, the physical appearance and personality of the Doctor changes. Baker portrays the sixth such incarnation: conceived by producer John Nathan-Turner and Baker to be an arrogant and abrasive character. The Sixth is flamboyantly dressed in brightly coloured, mismatched clothes with a patronising personality intentionally written and portrayed to set him apart from all his previous incarnations.

Preceded in regeneration by the Fifth Doctor (Peter Davison), he is followed by the Seventh Doctor (Sylvester McCoy). The Sixth Doctor appeared in two seasons, although his first regular appearance was in The Twin Dilemma (1984), the final story of season 21. The Sixth appeared with only two companions on-screen, most notably the American college student Peri Brown (Nicola Bryant), who had travelled with his previous incarnation, before being briefly joined by Mel Bush (Bonnie Langford), a computer technician from his future.

Prior to its hiatus, season 23 was well into preproduction, with episodes under active development before BBC1 executive Michael Grade forcibly paused all production on Doctor Who. Once it was allowed to return, the planned production for season 23 was dropped in favour of the 14-episode story arc The Trial of a Time Lord. Unsatisfied with Baker's performance, Grade demanded Nathan-Turner terminate him from the role if Doctor Who was to be renewed for further seasons, despite Baker having signed up for four years. Baker, displeased by the treatment he received from the production during his tenure, refused to return to film his regeneration at the beginning of Time and the Rani (1987), offering instead to return for one last season where he would regenerate at the end, but receiving no further response after his counter-offer.

The Sixth Doctor's time on television received frequent criticism for its violence, darker tone compared to prior seasons of the show, and antagonistic relationship between the Doctor and companion Peri. Since the end of the Sixth Doctor's run, novels and audio plays have featured the character in further adventures, most prominently in those commissioned by Big Finish Productions; they have also been visually referenced several times in the revived 2000s production of the show. Baker eventually returned to play the role in the show 36 years after he had been fired to film a cameo as the Sixth Doctor in "The Power of the Doctor" (2022), where he appeared among multiple other past incarnations as figments within the consciousness of the Thirteenth Doctor (Jodie Whittaker).

== Biography ==
The Sixth Doctor (Colin Baker) was first seen briefly at the end of The Caves of Androzani (1984), where the Fifth Doctor (Peter Davison), having resisted regeneration throughout the latter half of the story, finally succumbs to his injuries and transforms into his latest incarnation.

Due to the circumstances of his prior iteration's death, the Sixth Doctor suffers from post-regeneration trauma in his debut The Twin Dilemma (1984), where he acts out erratically, seen in his strangulation of companion Peri Brown (Nicola Bryant), whom he accuses of being an "alien spy". Unaware of what he had done, but consumed with guilt as he witnesses the newfound terror felt towards him by Peri, the Doctor vows to "become a hermit" on the asteroid of Titan III, only to meet the lone survivor of a crashed ship and a mysterious dome on the asteroid's surface when they arrive. The Doctor and Peri go on to uncover and stop a conspiracy by a member of an alien species known as the Gastropods to hypnotise a pair of super-intelligent adolescents, whom they had planned to use to advance their nefarious goals; at the end of the story, the Doctor reassures Peri that, through the course of their debut adventure, he had since fully recovered from his earlier bout of madness, confidently insisting "I am the Doctor – whether you like it…or not!"

He went on to encounter many old foes including the Master (Anthony Ainley), Davros (Terry Molloy) and the Daleks, Cybermen, and the Sontarans, and shared an adventure with his own second incarnation (Patrick Troughton) in The Two Doctors (1985). The Sixth would face new enemies too, such as a renegade female Time Lord scientist, the Rani (Kate O'Mara), and Sil (Nabil Shaban), a repulsively greedy slug creature.

The Sixth Doctor would be subject to a trial arranged by the High Council of the Time Lords, beginning in The Mysterious Planet (1986). Under the prosecution of the Valeyard (Michael Jayston), the Doctor was accused of violating the Time Lord decree of non-inference, although more charges were added throughout The Trial of a Time Lord storyline. An adventure the Sixth and Peri had on the devastated planet Ravolox, which they discovered to actually be Earth, moved across space by unknown forces that resulted in devastating consequences, was shown as evidence. A separate adventure in Mindwarp (1986) was shown as further evidence, when the TARDIS landed on Thoros Beta and they reunited with the villainous Sil. What actually occurred here is left intentionally unclear, but initial accounts suggested that Peri was killed after being cruelly used as a test subject in brain transplant experiments, which the Doctor was stopped from preventing after having been pulled out of time by the Time Lords to face trial. Although as later revealed, the Valeyard had been tampering with evidence shown during the trial, specifically the recordings of the Doctor's travels; in reality, Peri had survived the events of the story, and went on to marry an alien warrior king met during the same period.

In reality, the trial was a cover-up organised by the High Council, sparked in reaction to an alien race from the Andromeda Galaxy stealing Time Lord secrets and hiding them on Earth; in an effort to dispose of the evidence, the Time Lords renamed Earth to Ravolox, moved it through space, and scorched the surface in a massive fireball, which the Doctor unknowingly uncovered much to his outrage. As the trial continued, the Valeyard would also be unmasked as an alternate, evil incarnation of the Doctor, who was an amalgamation of his darkest traits extracted between the Doctor's twelfth and final incarnations. The trial tangled the Doctor's timeline slightly, as he left in the company of future companion Mel Bush (Bonnie Langford), a fitness enthusiast from Pease Pottage, whom he technically had not met yet.

When the TARDIS is attacked by the Rani at the beginning of Time and the Rani (1987), the Sixth Doctor was somehow injured and regenerated into the Seventh Doctor (Sylvester McCoy); the exact cause of the regeneration, however, is not given on-screen.

=== Other appearances ===
The Sixth Doctor starred in A Fix with Sontarans (1985), a segment of the children's television programme Jim'll Fix It, featuring the return of former companion Tegan Jovanka (Janet Fielding) and attacking Sontarans. His image has appeared among other incarnations in several revival series episodes, often in montages, beginning with "The Next Doctor" (2008). He was briefly portrayed via a stunt double for "The Name of the Doctor" (2013) and appears in "The Day of the Doctor" (2013) using archived footage. The Sixth returned in "The Power of the Doctor" (2022), marking 36 years since he last appeared on television, as a "vestige of [the Doctor's] consciousness", alongside previous Doctors, now all visibly aged as part of the "Guardians of the Edge" who are figments within the mind of the Thirteenth Doctor (Jodie Whittaker).

For the third episode of the spin-off series Tales of the TARDIS in 2023, the Sixth Doctor reunited with a returning Peri, now a warrior queen. Sixth appears as an older, bearded version, now sporting a pink three-piece suit with rainbow-coloured socks and a dog badge in place of his usual cat badge. The pair recount the events of Vengeance on Varos (1985) before setting off for further adventures.

==== Comics ====
The Sixth Doctor has featured in a number of comic stories published in Doctor Who Magazine, which ran concurrently with the television series during the 1980s. These comic stories featured the Sixth and Peri in new adventures, but would also introduce a new companion for him named Frobisher, a "self-styled, street-smart detective" and shapeshifting alien who often took the form of a penguin. Marvel UK went on to publish a comic featuring the Sixth Doctor and Frobisher written by Baker himself, titled The Age of Chaos, which centred on the two traveling to the planet Krontep "on a quest to track down Peri's grandchildren".

==== Novels ====
Multiple scrapped episodes that were a part of the original plan for season 23 of Doctor Who prior to the show's 18-month hiatus went on to be developed into novels (and later audio play recreations) as part of the Target Missing Episodes line beginning in 1994, which included The Nightmare Fair by Graham Williams, The Ultimate Evil by Wally K. Daly, and Mission to Magnus by Philip Martin.

The Sixth Doctor appeared briefly in the Seventh Doctor-centric Virgin New Adventures series, specifically in the novel Head Games by Steve Lyons, where he materialised as a manifestation of his own persona that goes on to attack the Seventh Doctor, accusing him of having gone down a darker path from his own. The Sixth featured more prominently in the Virgin Missing Adventures series of books, appearing in novels such as State of Change by Christopher Bulis, Time of Your Life and Killing Ground, both by Lyons, and Millennial Rites by Craig Hinton, which involved dimensional instabilities that led to the Sixth Doctor briefly transforming into the Valeyard. Similarly, the Sixth also headlined novels from the Past Doctor Adventures line, such as Business Unusual by Gary Russell, which acted as the companion introduction for Mel, unseen in the Doctor's original television tenure, Players by Terrance Dicks, which served as a sequel to The War Games (1969) and featured a returning Second Doctor, and Spiral Scratch, one of many interpretations behind the circumstances surrounding the Sixth Doctor's regeneration. He would cameo in the Eighth Doctor Adventures line, where he, among several other past incarnations, met the Eighth Doctor in The Eight Doctors.

==== Video games ====
The Sixth Doctor featured as the main protagonist in 1985's Doctor Who and the Mines of Terror where he works to stop the Master from "setting himself up as the Devil at the beginning of time" so he can be immortal. The Sixth appeared alongside the first seven incarnations of the Doctor in 1998's Destiny of the Doctors, where he and the others have been captured by the Master (played by a returning Ainley) and must be rescued by the player character. The Sixth was also featured in 2015's Lego Dimensions as one of the incarnations of the Doctor the player could unlock and play as.

==== Audio dramas ====
Alongside the Fifth and Seventh Doctors, the Sixth Doctor was the first to mainline a release by Big Finish Productions in 1999's audio play The Sirens of Time, the first entry in Big Finish's Monthly Adventures line of audio-exclusive stories featuring the returning cast of Doctor Who reprising their roles. The Sixth Doctor's involvement was seen as an opportunity to further develop underexplored aspects of the character and make-up for missed opportunities left unfulfilled from his television tenure. This included the introduction of the first audio-exclusive companion Evelyn Smythe (Maggie Stables) in 2000's The Marian Conspiracy, who would serve as a more assertive presence that was able to challenge the Sixth's abrasive personality, a reunion with Peri after having departed the Doctor at the end of The Trial of a Time Lord in 2014's The Widow's Assassin, and a "proper" regeneration story in a final fight with the Valeyard in 2015's The Brink of Death.

The noncanonical Doctor Who Unbound range would also explore aspects of the Sixth Doctor previously not possible within the series continuity, including the 2003 story He Jests at Scars..., a reality where the Valeyard succeeded in killing the Sixth following the events of The Trial of a Time Lord.

Including Smythe, additional companions the Sixth would make within Big Finish included "Edwardian adventuress" Charley Pollard (performed by India Fisher; a former companion of the Eighth Doctor, rescued by the Sixth as part of a temporal paradox), supermarket check-out girl Flip Jackson (Lisa Greenwood), and WREN code-breaker Constance Clarke (Miranda Raison). Brigadier Lethbridge-Stewart (Nicholas Courtney) would occasionally assist the Sixth in various Big Finish stories, such as 2000's The Spectre of Lanyon Moor, another opportunity left unfulfilled during the television series. Prior to that, the two had only met during a brief interaction in the 1993 charity special Dimensions in Time. Frobisher (Robert Jezek), a companion of the Sixth Doctor's originating from his comic appearances, would also return and appear with the Sixth in multiple audio adventures.

== Development ==
=== Casting ===
Prior to being cast, various media outlets had suggested Colin Baker should be the one to replace Peter Davison as the Doctor. Baker, a fan of Doctor Who, had expressed interest and previously considered auditioning for the role of the Fourth Doctor. However, due to Baker's casting as Commander Maxil in Arc of Infinity (1983), he assumed he was ineligible for the role. During a meeting with the production team on 10 June 1983, Baker was formally offered the role by producer John Nathan-Turner. He accepted and signed a four-year contract.

"[We] had envisaged an overall plan over a few years of how we could learn more about this Doctor and didn't want to give too much away in the first few seasons. I always like to compare the idea to that of the character Darcy in Pride and Prejudice. For the first 35% of the book you hate him, then you grudgingly come to like him, and by the end of the book you think he's the best person in it."

— Baker on the Sixth Doctor's characterisation

=== Characterisation ===
For his introduction to audiences, Nathan-Turner conceptualised the Sixth Doctor as suffering from similar mental traumas to that of the Fifth Doctor in Castrovalva (1981), using it as an opportunity to illustrate the contrasts in personalities between the two Doctors. Whereas the Fifth was portrayed as "lost and frightened" shortly after his regeneration, the Sixth would be "egotistical, brash, arrogant, and moody". The plan was, however, to have him slowly recover and become more recognisable as the heroic Doctor that audiences were familiar with. Baker agreed with the idea, comparing it to Mr. Darcy from Pride and Prejudice, whom he was excited to have the Sixth Doctor emulate. He would describe it as "quite exciting to have a character who was a little inaccessible, a little enigmatic. I don't know if you have this experience in your life, but I have it in mine, the people who are my best friends are the ones I didn't like much at first. Some of them I loathed at first." But for the meantime, the Sixth Doctor would possess a "mordant sense of humour and ruthless streak".

One element of the Sixth's fragile mental state was in his initial confrontation, and strangulation, of companion Peri Brown early into his debut story, The Twin Dilemma (1984), something which Baker and Nicola Bryant approved of portraying, both agreeing it was "brave" to include. Throughout the remainder of the story, the Sixth continued to display symptoms reminiscent of bipolar disorder, placing him "at the mercy of violent mood swings that yaw him from cringing fear to homicidal paranoia" coupled with lapses in memory. Though the Fifth Doctor recovered by the end of his introductory story, the Sixth Doctor retained a temperamental personality by the conclusion of his. By the beginning of his second story, Attack of the Cybermen (1985), he had grown less violent towards his companion, but remained "impatient and insensitive" and still "suffering gaps in his memory". The Sixth and Peri would remain argumentative towards one another, often sparring verbally, acknowledged at the end of The Mark of the Rani (1985) when the Sixth, questioned on what Peri and he do in the TARDIS, says they "argue mainly".

=== Costume ===
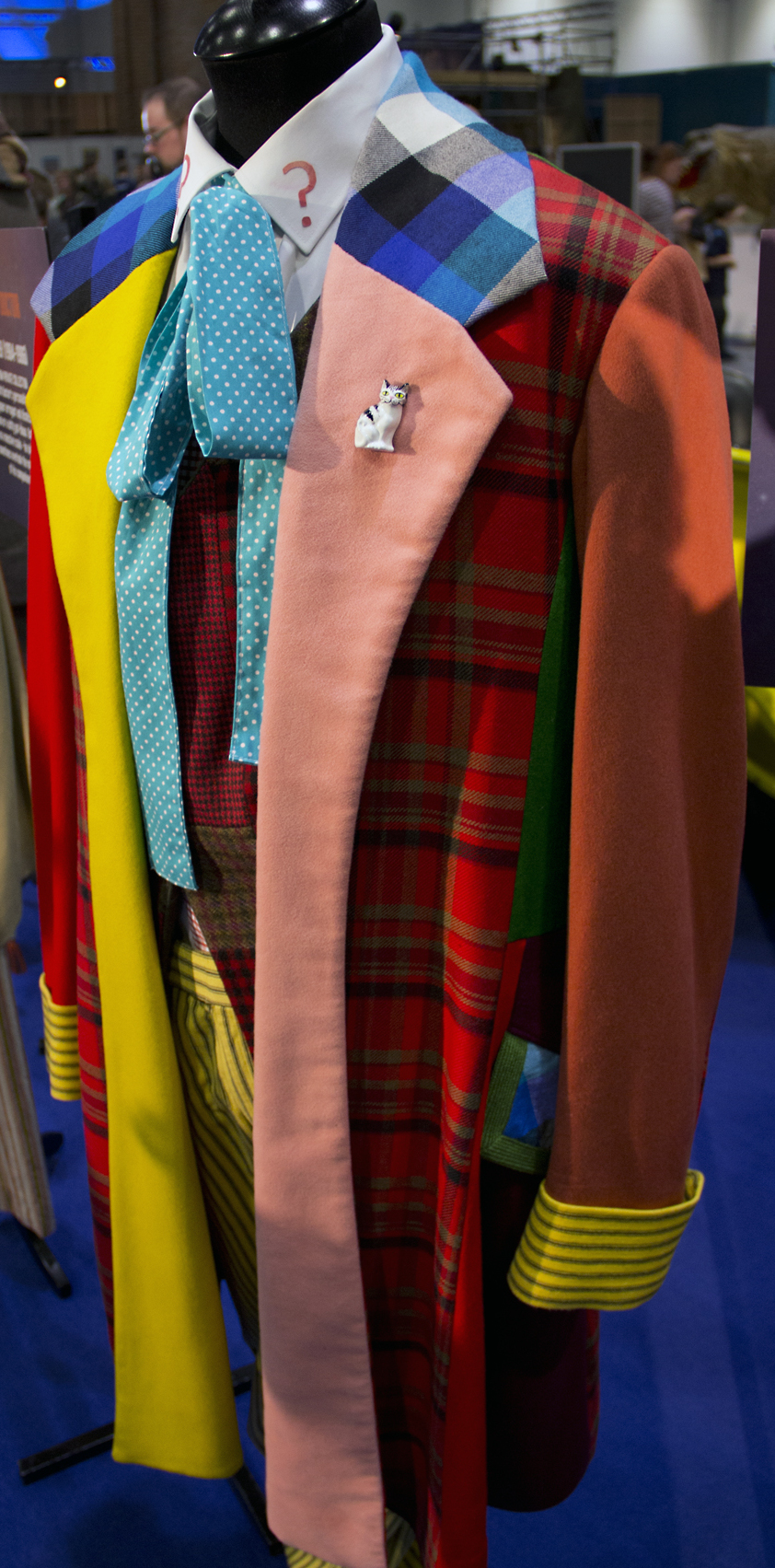
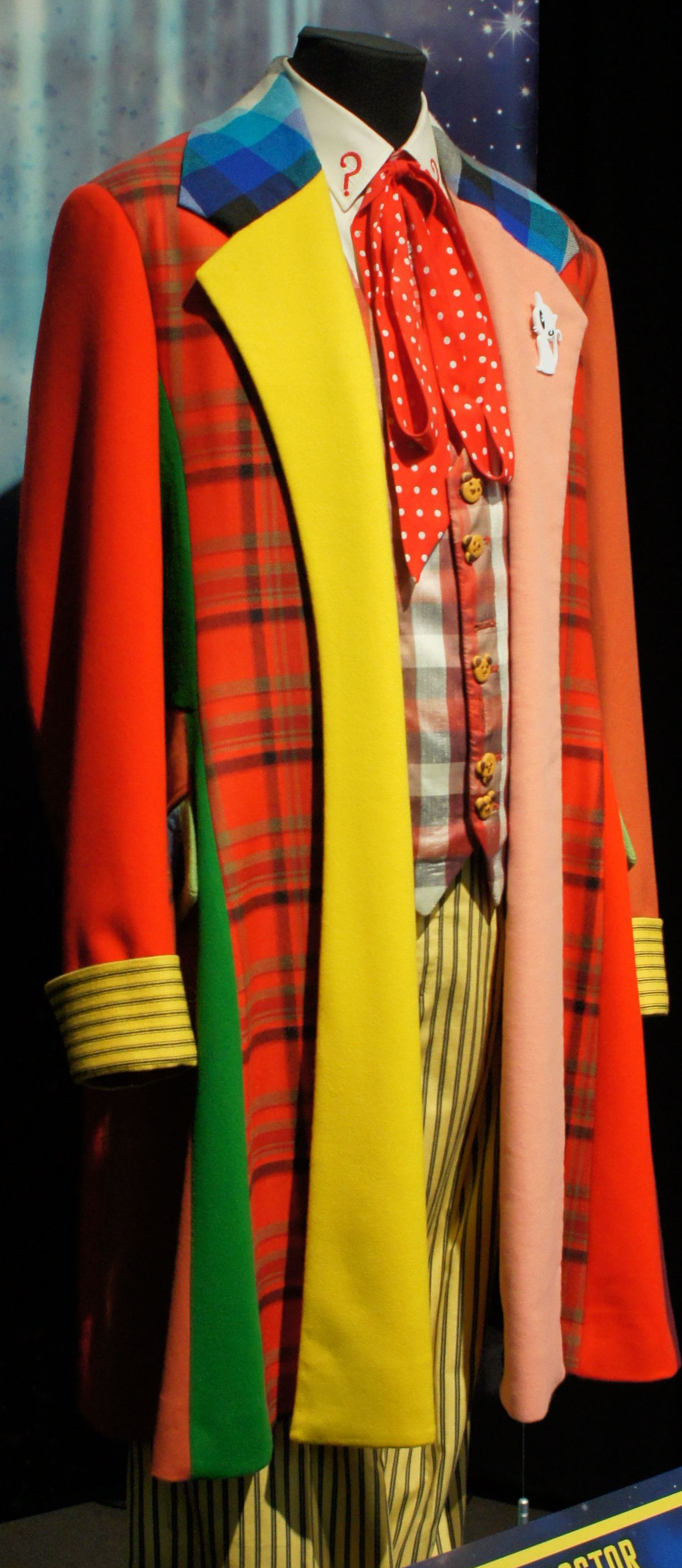
The Sixth Doctor's costume as seen in season 22 (left) and season 23 (right)

Baker wished to dress his Doctor in black velvet, to reflect his character's darker personality. Nathan-Turner, however, opted for a deliberately "totally tasteless" costume with clashing colours. Designer Pat Godfrey made several attempts which were considered not tasteless enough before Nathan-Turner finally accepted the last one as sufficiently garish. Baker later described the outfit as "an explosion in a rainbow factory".

The Sixth Doctor wears a scarlet plaid frock coat, with green patchwork, and yellow and pink lapels over a white shirt with crimson question marks embroidered in the collar (a feature of the programme since 1980), a waistcoat with a fob watch, a large tie, yellow trousers with black stripes, and emerald green ankle boots with royal orange spats. There were many variants on the waistcoat and tie, the earliest being the knitted brown waistcoat and turquoise cravat. The waistcoat was changed to a deep, muted burgundy check, and in the following story a new crimson cravat with cream polka dots appeared. In-universe, the coat was tailored on the planet Kolpasha, which the Doctor asserts is the "fashion capital of the universe".

The costume saw minimal redesign for The Trial of a Time Lord, with the coat remaining the same. A new red and pink plaid waistcoat was introduced, which included buttons in the design of teddy bears, and a new polka-dotted scarlet bow tie. A future version of the Sixth Doctor seen in Terror of the Vervoids (1986) wore a new silk waistcoat with green, blue, and pink diagonal stripes with a canary yellow bow tie. During Baker's run in the stage play Doctor Who – The Ultimate Adventure, the original frock coat was replaced by one with a scarlet, blue, and purple colour scheme, which was worn over a white waistcoat overlayed with striped blue, red, and black vertical lines.

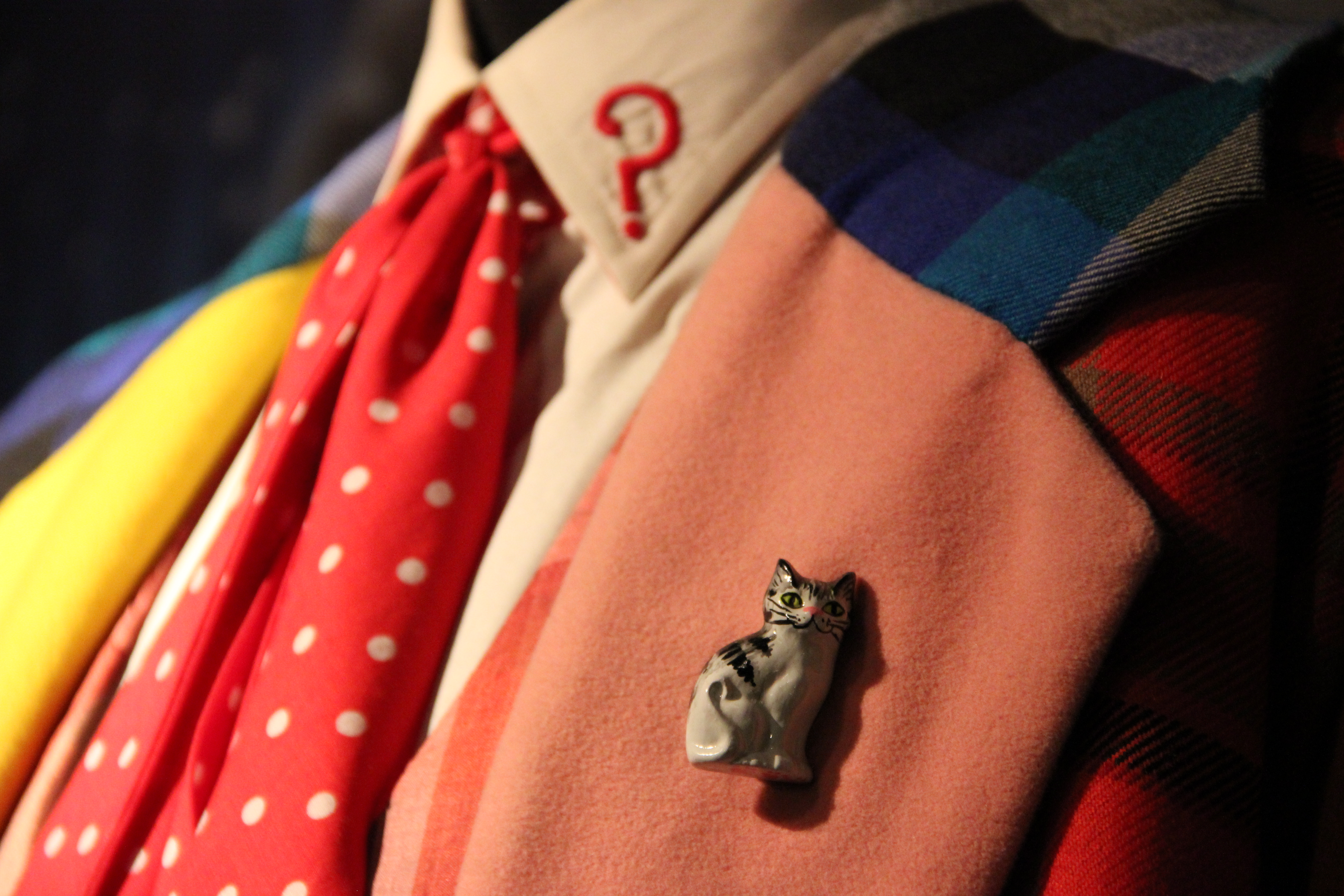
The Sixth Doctor would wear a cat badge on his left lapel which he would rub for good luck.

Baker added a cat badge to the ensemble, worn on the left lapel of his coat, which the Sixth Doctor would occasionally rub for good luck. Baker cited the Rudyard Kipling short story "The Cat that Walked by Himself" as inspiration for it, specifically stating the repeated line in it "I am the Cat that walks by himself, and all places are alike to me" as reminding him strongly of the Doctor.

A royal blue version of the original costume has been used in spin-off media, first seen in the webcast Real Time, which was done due to the limited availability of colours in the type of animation used, which prevented use of the original multi-coloured coat. Previously, the Sixth Doctor wore a blue-and-gold cloak in Revelation of the Daleks (1985), due to blue being the "official mourning colour on Necros".

=== Hiatus ===
BBC1 controller Michael Grade, shortly after taking his position in 1984, announced a programme needed to be cancelled to save on production costs, to be used to produce a new drama for the broadcaster. Grade would ultimately decide that Doctor Who, a show he openly admitted he was not a fan of, would be cancelled to make up for this. Aided by the uproar generated from the increasingly violent nature of its stories, as well as claims that its writing was deteriorating in quality, head of drama Jonathan Powell went on to approve of Grade's decision and officiated the show's cancellation. Powell, like Grade, greatly disliked both the show and Nathan-Turner, whom he wanted to "fuck off ... or die, really".

The unexpected hiatus greatly impacted the planned character arc the Sixth Doctor was undergoing, with episodes for the then-upcoming season 23 having to be scrapped completely. In the eighteen-month period between when Doctor Who left and, after fan campaigning, returned to the airwaves, script editor Eric Saward and regular scriptwriter Robert Holmes came together and devise the idea for The Trial of a Time Lord.

Taking inspiration from Charles Dickens's A Christmas Carol, The Trial of a Time Lord would feature an interconnecting sub-plot throughout where the Sixth Doctor "would confront his past, his present, and his future" meant to act as a piece of metafictional commentary in relation to the show which "itself was on trial". Late into production, Holmes fell ill and died before he could finish writing the second part to the season finale, The Ultimate Foe (1986), only finishing an initial outline for it beforehand. Originally, Saward, Holmes, and Nathan-Turner would settle on a cliffhanger ending involving the Sixth Doctor and Valeyard (Note: Sources differ on whether the Valeyard or the Master would have been revealed as the true antagonist of The Trial of a Time Lord in its original draft.) locked in battle and falling through a "time vent" with "their final fate unknown", a reference to the end of "The Final Problem" where Sherlock Holmes and Moriarty plummet from Reichenbach Falls. However, Saward, after taking over writing duties from Holmes on The Ultimate Foe (1986), would come into conflict with Nathan-Turner, who decided against ending the season on a cliffhanger, now ordering Saward to rewrite it as he believed it would give the BBC further reason to "kill off the show". Saward, displeased, would abruptly resign and threaten legal action if Doctor Who reused elements from his now withdrawn script, forcing late replacement writers Pip and Jane Baker to "come up with some kind of ending" that could satisfactorily conclude the season.

Following transmission of The Trial of a Time Lord, Grade would deliver an ultimatum to Nathan-Turner demanding Baker be fired from the role, claiming he was too unpopular with the fans to reasonably retain, although those such as producer Gary Downie would allege Grade harboured personal animosity towards Baker due to being in a relationship at the time with Liza Goddard, Baker's ex-wife. Baker, disgruntled with the treatment he was receiving, declined an offer to return and star in a story that he would regenerate at the end of, which would begin the following season. Reflecting years later, Baker commented "[this] was in November and that would take place the following March/April ... I wasn't going to commit myself to two weeks work the next March/April ... and I'll be honest, I was hacked off. I saw no reason to be nice to them ... I thought I had more to offer." An offer to instead return for the entirety of a final season that he would regenerate at the end of was made by Baker, but he "never heard back".

== Reception ==
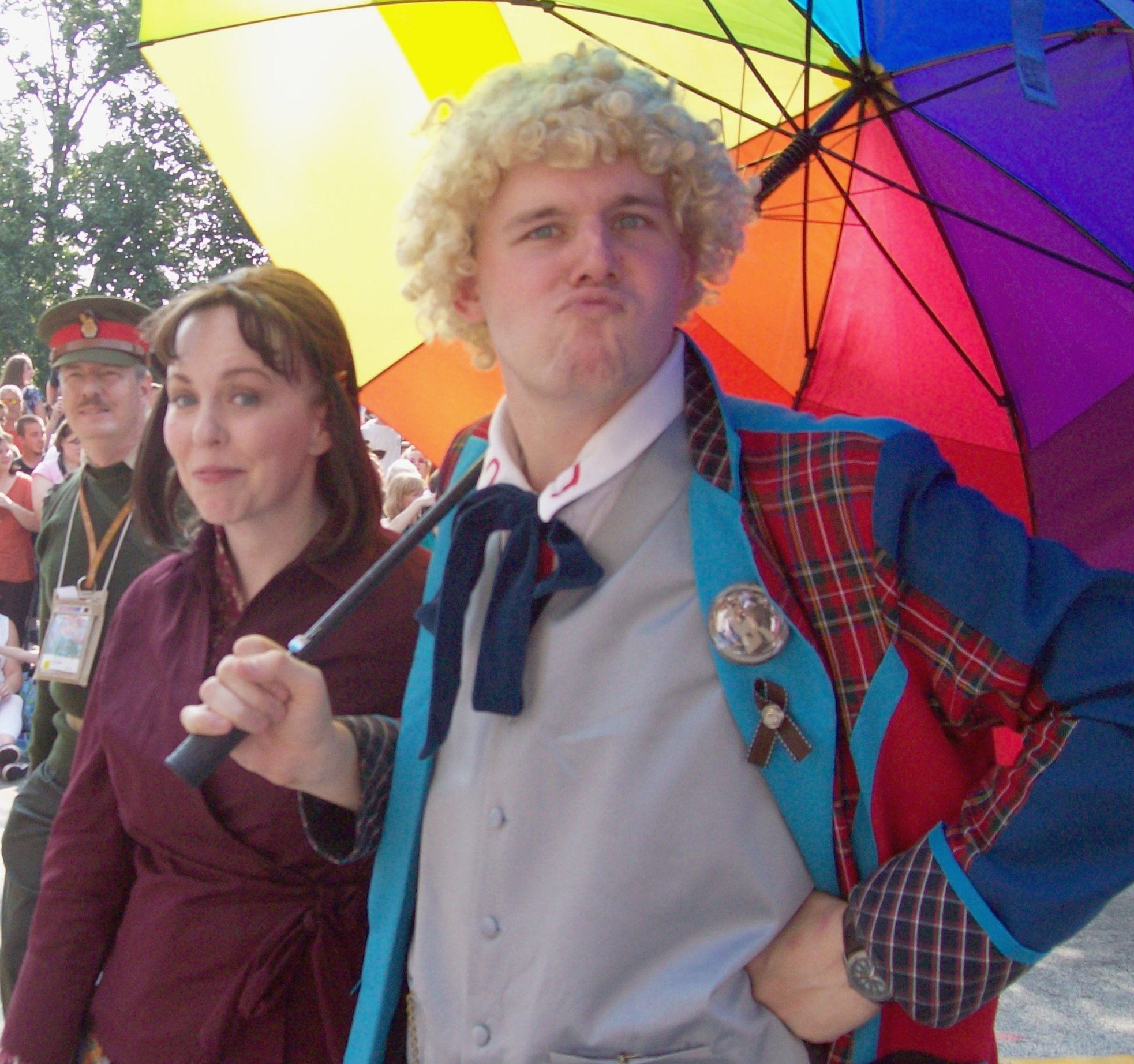
A fan cosplays as the Sixth Doctor from The Ultimate Adventure stage play

An internal 1988 BBC survey, which was taken a few years following Colin Baker's departure from the role, saw his portrayal receive a personal index figure of 66 which indicated a "moderately popular" view from audiences. The immediate reaction towards the Sixth's "aggressive, hostile, and violent" characterisation in his debut story The Twin Dilemma (1984), further exacerbated when compared to the Fifth Doctor's noble sacrifice in the preceding season episode The Caves of Androzani (1984), has been cited as a significant catalyst for the poor reception the newly-introduced Sixth Doctor received and continued to suffer from throughout the duration of Baker's tenure.

Michael Grade, at the time the controller of BBC1, attempted to cancel Doctor Who following transmission of Baker's first season, calling the show "rubbish" and heavily criticising the supposedly violent nature of Baker's era, which he felt was a poor use of viewers' licence fee. Compared to his predecessors, the Sixth, and his adventures, garnered a reputation for violence, often attributed to era script editor Eric Saward. In Attack of the Cybermen (1985), a character has their hands crushed by Cybermen, with blood explicitly shown. Later stories, such as Vengeance on Varos and Revelation of the Daleks (both 1985), continued to feature characters being tortured or mutilated by their villains. In response to these threats, the Sixth Doctor is portrayed as "[confronting] a violent universe head-on" and being "relentlessly male, embracing violence and bullying his way into situations". When cornered by the Cybermen, the Sixth equips one of their firearms and engages in a firefight with them. In Timelash (1985), he repeatedly insults the main antagonist "telling him that nobody wants him, nobody needs him and nobody cares". The frequency in which Peri would be placed in damsel scenarios was also subject to criticism, such as instances in Timelash and The Two Doctors (both 1985); the need for the Sixth to repeatedly save her was seen as another masculine role the character would take on "to present himself as a proper hero to his viewing audience", but as a consequence, it was felt to have reduced his companion's agency.

Years following his portrayal of the character on television, Baker would return to play the Sixth Doctor once again beginning in 1999 with his involvement in a series of Doctor Who audio plays produced by Big Finish Productions. This has frequently been cited as contributing to a revitalisation of the incarnation among the fanbase, with popularly received stories, such as 2003's Jubilee, receiving critical acclaim. Baker would credit Big Finish for properly utilising him in the role of the Sixth Doctor in a way he felt the television series never truly did, saying in an interview promoting The Last Adventure that "[Big Finish] have given my Doctor the opportunity to live beyond those few episodes on television which were recorded during a time when the programme was under siege from various quarters...the Sixth Doctor has lived and breathed anew and developed in a way that I am extremely happy with."

== See also ==
- History of Doctor Who – Sixth Doctor
