= Philip Martin (screenwriter) =

English television screenwriter (1938–2020)

- Born: Philip Charles Martin; 3 July 1938; Liverpool, England
- Died: 13 December 2020 (aged 82); Lancaster, Lancashire, England
- Occupation: Screenwriter

Philip Martin (3 July 1938 – 13 December 2020) was an English television screenwriter. He created the BBC television drama series Gangsters in the 1970s and later wrote two television serials for Doctor Who during Colin Baker's tenure as the Sixth Doctor in the 1980s.

== Career ==
His early work included regular series such as Z-Cars in the late 1960s/early 1970s, but his most famous work is the postmodern television series Gangsters. This was an examination of race seen through an increasingly surreal vision of Birmingham's criminal underworld. Beginning as an acclaimed one-off edition of Play for Today in 1975, it was followed by two series of 6 episodes each in 1976 and 1978. Martin appeared in the series in several roles, including as himself.

His later work includes Tandoori Nights (1985), Star Cops (1987), Virtual Murder (1992), several episodes of Hetty Wainthropp Investigates and Luifel & Luifel (2001).

=== Doctor Who ===
He wrote the Doctor Who serials Vengeance on Varos (1985) and The Trial of a Time Lord: Mindwarp (1986). He also wrote a script called Mission to Magnus which featured the character Sil from his previous televised serials. That script was never filmed when the show was put on hiatus in 1985. A novelised version of the script written by Martin was released by Target Books in 1990, and a Big Finish audio drama based on the serial was released in December 2009. He also wrote a Doctor Who gamebook called Invasion of the Ormazoids (1986) as part of the Make your own adventure with Doctor Who range. His last contributions to the series were The Creed of the Kromon (2004) and Antidote to Oblivion (2013), as Big Finish audio releases. He also revisited the character of Sil in the independent broadcast television series from Reeltime Pictures Ltd., "Sil and the Devil Seeds of Arodor" (2019).

=== Theatre ===
Martin's stage play Thee and Me, a work dealing with the effects of ozone depletion in the atmosphere in the year 2040, was staged at London's Lyttelton Theatre in February 1980, directed by Michael Rudman, but was withdrawn early from the repertoire because of poor reviews and "appalling" ticket sales.
