= John Tulloch (lecturer) =

British lecturer

- Born: 1942 (age 83–84); Pondicherry, British India
- Occupations: Lecturer, academic
- Known for: 7 July 2005 London bombings survivor

John Tulloch (born 1942) is a British-Australian educator and university lecturer who is best known as a survivor of the 7 July 2005 London bombings. He became a symbol of the attacks when a photograph with his injuries was published. Tulloch faced deportation from the United Kingdom due to a dispute over his citizenship which was resolved in November 2012.

== Early life ==
Tulloch was born in Pondicherry, India to British parents with ancestry tracing back to the 13th century. His father served for Britain in the Ghurka Rifles and fought in Burma. His grandfather was a forester and his great-grandfather served in the Indian Civil Service. His brother was also born in India. The family moved back to Britain when Tulloch was aged three years old.

Tulloch was educated in Bournemouth and took courses at Cambridge University and Sussex University.

== Academic career ==
Tulloch had a research programme which led to a book on the long-running Australian television series A Country Practice, and spent six months working for the production team on Doctor Who. The latter project resulted in the seminal academic book Dr Who: The Unfolding Text (1983) which he co-authored with Manuel Alvarado.

He won a research grant in 2003 to work on risk, reconstruction and media in Kosovo at the time of the start of the Iraq War. While writing Risk in Everyday Life he became concerned for people dealing professionally with risk, and their insecurity when communicating with the media. This led to him changing the focus of his research towards new-wars theory in 2004. Tulloch signalled this new direction publicly when he changed the topics of his keynote address at conferences held in Melbourne (2004) and at the University of Kent in January 2005.

== 7 July 2005 ==
In early July 2005, Tulloch arrived back from Australia to travel to his home in Cardiff. On 7 July 2005, he made his preparation when boarding a train in the Edgware Road tube station. As he sat down, because another man had been "spilling over" his seat, Tulloch moved closer to Mohammed Sidique Khan, who had two rucksacks containing explosives. Just as Tulloch was about to stand up, the explosives in Khan's rucksacks exploded, killing seven people and critically injuring Tulloch, who sustained swollen and cut eyes, and shrapnel embedded in his head.

Tulloch became aware of his injuries before noticing two American women. Soon afterwards he started to regain feeling in his legs. He was photographed with his injuries which became an iconic image of the bombings. The photograph would later be used in a headline in The Sun which was used without the consent of Tulloch.

Tulloch was taken to St Mary's Paddington Hospital and visited there by Prince Charles and Camilla, Duchess of Cornwall. He was released from hospital on 14 July.

Since the bombings, Tulloch wrote a book entitled One Day in July recalling the events about surviving the attacks and has suffered from post-traumatic distress disorder. On the first anniversary of the attacks in 2006, Tulloch attended a memorial at Regent's Park.

On 15 May 2012, Tulloch filed a lawsuit against News Corporation believing that he had become a victim of phone hacking and that his personal details were in the hands of private investigator Glenn Mulcaire.

== Deportation threat ==
In 1983 Tulloch, who was a British subject without citizenship rather than a British Citizen, acquired Australian citizenship, with a consequence that he lost his British subject without citizenship status, although he was not aware of the full implications of this at the time. Following his return to the UK, he was able to work under a work permit when he became head of the School of Journalism at Cardiff University. He once tried to renew his British passport in the early 1990s, but without success.

As he moved into semi-retirement his previous work permit expired, and in 2012 he was threatened with deportation. He described the situation as "bizarre", as other members of his family had been holding full British citizenship without his realising his own status. Upon The Telegraph reporting the case, there was an immediate outpouring of public anger. He submitted an application for full British citizenship on 9 November 2012, which was granted on 18 November.

It was reported that the Home Office had only backed down after some MPs recommended the case be resolved.
