= Colin Baker =

English actor (born 1943)

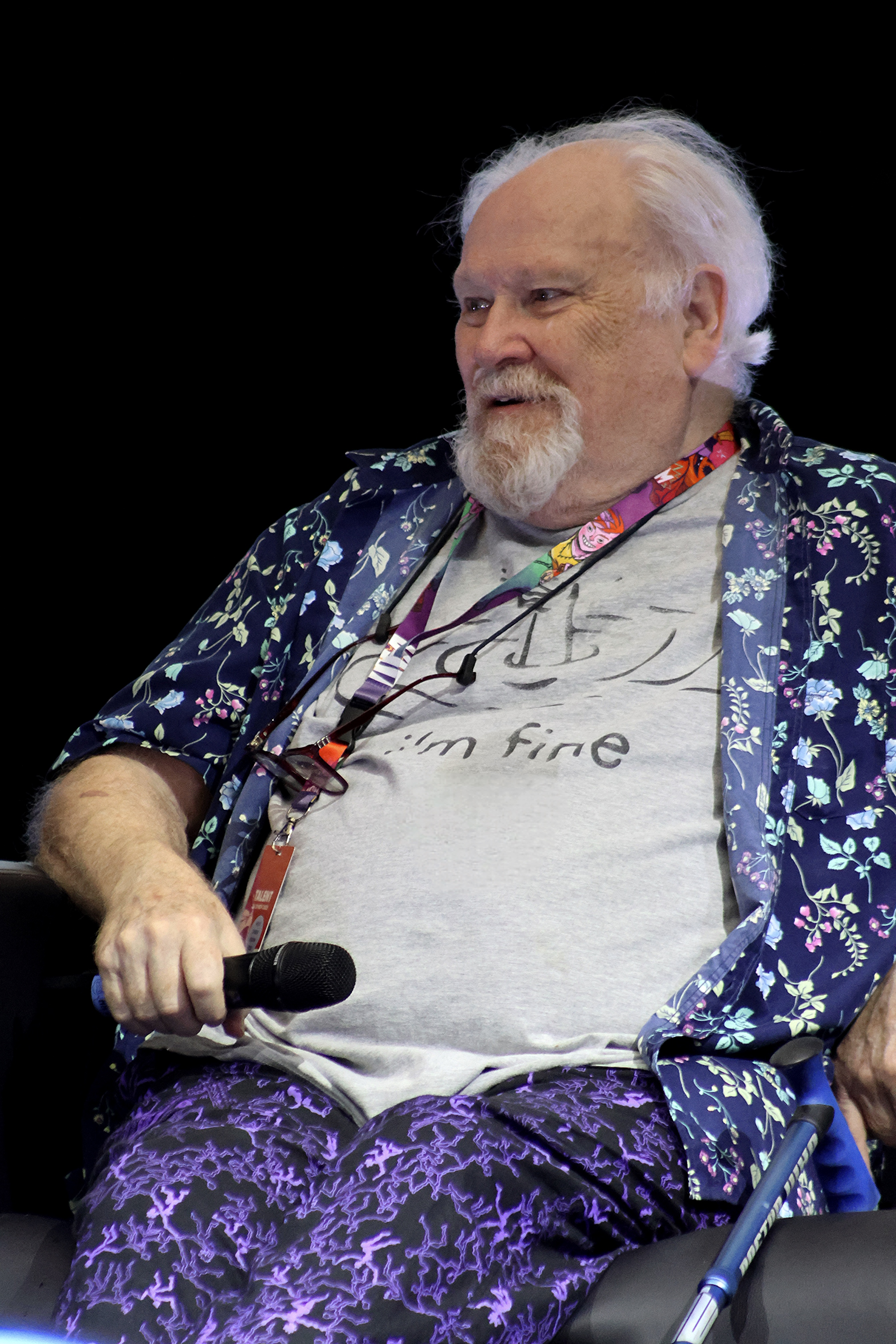
- Baker at MCM Birmingham 2025
- Born: 8 June 1943 (age 83); Waterloo, London, England
- Education: London Academy of Music and Dramatic Art
- Occupation: Actor
- Years active: 1969–present
- Spouses: Liza Goddard (m. 1976; div. 1978); Marion Wyatt (m. 1982)
- Children: 5 (1 deceased)
- Website: colinbakeronline.com

Colin Charles Baker (born 8 June 1943) is an English actor. He is known for playing the sixth incarnation of the Doctor in the BBC science fiction series Doctor Who (1984–1986) and Paul Merroney in the BBC drama series The Brothers (1974–1976). He has also performed prolifically in stage productions across the UK, particularly pantomimes.

Born in London and raised in Rochdale, Baker began a career in law before training as an actor at the London Academy of Music and Dramatic Art. He had supporting parts in historical drama series such as The Roads to Freedom (1970), Cousin Bette (1971), War and Peace (1972) and Fall of Eagles (1974). Baker's role in The Brothers brought him fame but typecast him as villainous characters. He notably appeared as Bayban the Butcher in the science fiction series Blake's 7 (1980).

Following Baker's role as antagonistic Commander Maxil in the Doctor Who serial Arc of Infinity (1983), producer John Nathan-Turner cast him as the series' sixth lead actor. Baker's tenure as the Doctor proved to be turbulent. BBC executives Michael Grade and Jonathan Powell were unhappy with the series' direction, enforcing an 18-month hiatus after Baker's first season and ultimately forcing his dismissal from the role. Since 1999, Baker has regularly played the Doctor in licensed audio dramas produced by Big Finish Productions. He also reprised the role in the stage play The Ultimate Adventure (1989) and the television stories Dimensions in Time (1993) and "The Power of the Doctor" (2022).

== Early life and education ==
Colin Charles Baker was born on 8 June 1943 in Waterloo, London, the son of Charles Ernest Baker (died 1971), managing director of an asbestos company, and Lily Catherine (died 2001). He has Irish ancestry on his mother's side. As a baby he narrowly survived the Blitz when a piece of shrapnel from a neighbouring house lodged itself in his cot. He later moved with his family to Rochdale due to his father's work.

Baker's first experience acting was in a nativity play at his primary school. During his education at St Bede's College, Manchester, he took part in productions of The Yeomen of the Guard and Iolanthe. He made his first television appearance in the 1956 Christmas special of My Wife's Sister.

Baker studied French, Greek and Latin at A-Levels, achieving A grades in Greek and Latin. Baker desired to study modern languages at either Oxford or Cambridge, and to join the Oxford University Dramatic Society or Footlights. His father Charles saw university as "a waste of time". In 1991, Baker recalled that his father's income "was such that, without his say-so, I couldn't go anywhere, because I couldn't get a grant." Instead, Charles found his son employment as a trainee solicitor at the law firm Fox, Brooks & Marshall.

Baker initially felt that "the idea of being an actor seemed silly, frankly", but an encounter with a member of an amateur dramatic society led to him joining the North Manchester Amateur Operatic and Dramatic Society and later the Rochdale Curtain Theatre amateur group. After his father had a stroke, Baker abandoned his law career at age 22 and moved to London with his mother. Baker unsuccessfully auditioned for the Royal Academy of Dramatic Art; he succeeded the following year but instead chose to attend the London Academy of Music and Dramatic Art.

== Career ==
=== Early work in television and The Brothers ===
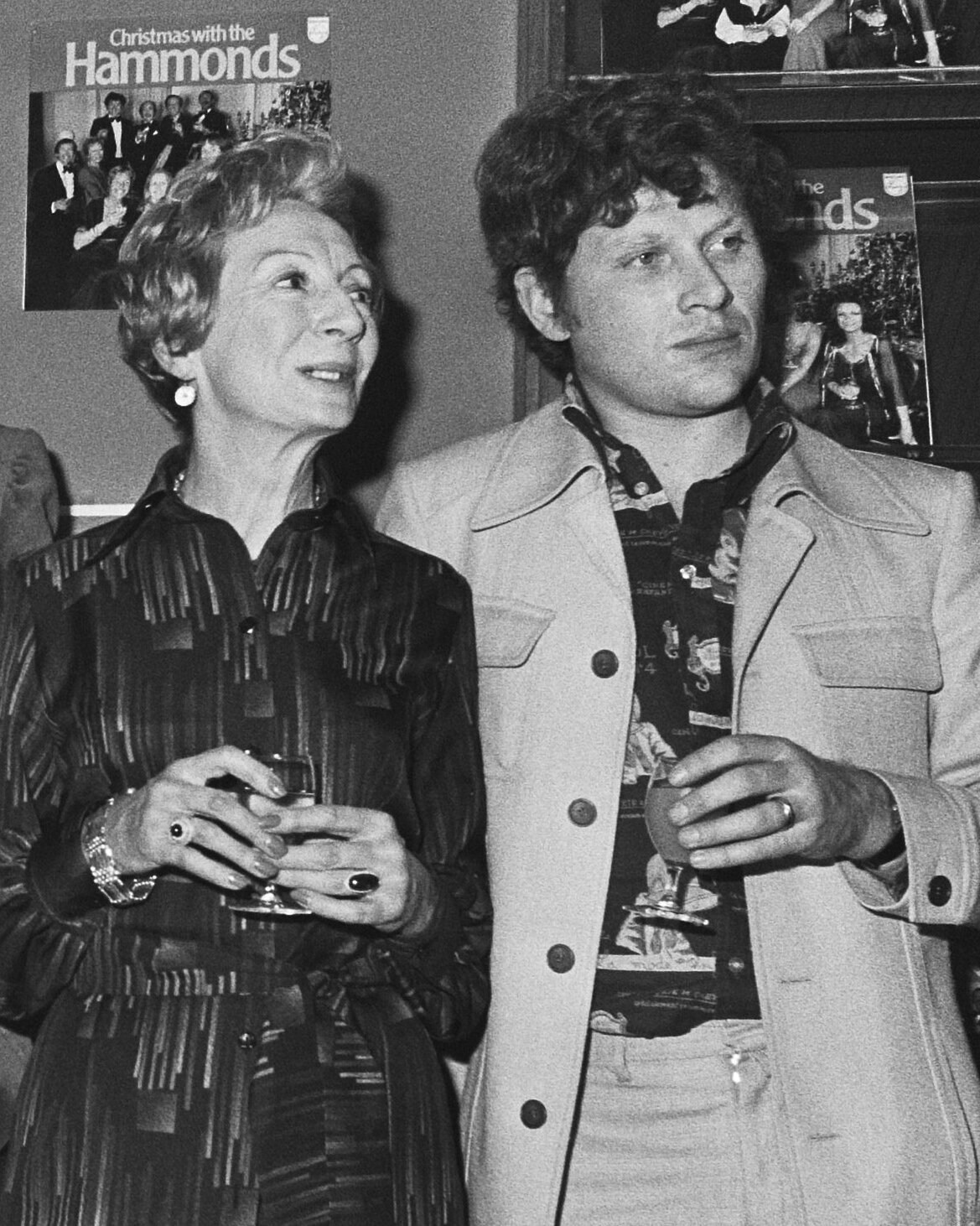
Baker with his The Brothers co-star Jean Anderson in 1976

Baker briefly worked as a taxi driver in Minehead during his first year as an acting graduate in 1969. His first professional role was in a three-week tour of Plaintiff in a Pretty Hat. He then appeared in The Other House at the Mermaid Theatre. Baker's first television appearance as a professional actor was in two episodes of The Roads to Freedom (1970), an adaptation of Jean-Paul Sartre's book series. The same year he appeared with Kate O'Mara in the science fiction comedy series The Adventures of Don Quick. He played Steinbock in an adaptation of Cousin Bette the following year, opposite Margaret Tyzack and Helen Mirren. He played Major Frayne in the 1972 drama series The Moonstone and Anatole Kuragin in the BBC's 1972 television adaptation of War and Peace. In Fall of Eagles (1974) he played Crown Prince Wilhelm of the German Empire. Baker came close to appearing in the Doctor Who serial The Mutants (1972) as Cotton, and was considered for the role of Jellicoe in Robot (1974–1975).

In September 1974, Baker joined the fourth season of BBC drama series The Brothers as the ruthless banker Paul Merroney. The sarcastic and self-conceited character—Baker's most prominent role to date—was a figure audiences loved to hate. Baker recalled that the character was so disliked that he was occasionally accosted in public by viewers with their umbrellas. Merroney was voted "the most hated man in Britain" by the readers of a national newspaper. Baker also became an unlikely sex symbol. The Brothers ended in late 1976. To avoid being typecast in villainous roles, Baker returned to the theatre, acting in tours of Underground, Trap for a Lonely Man and Stagestruck. He played Macduff in a 1978 production of Macbeth at the Haymarket in Leicester.

Baker returned to television, notably guest-starring as the villainous Bayban the Butcher in the 1980 Blake's 7 episode "City at the Edge of the World". He also had a regular role as James West in the ATV soap opera For Maddie with Love (1980). Other programmes in which Baker guest-starred include Dangerous Davies (1981), The Young Ones (1982), Juliet Bravo (1982), The Citadel (1983) and Swallows and Amazons Forever (1984).

=== Doctor Who ===
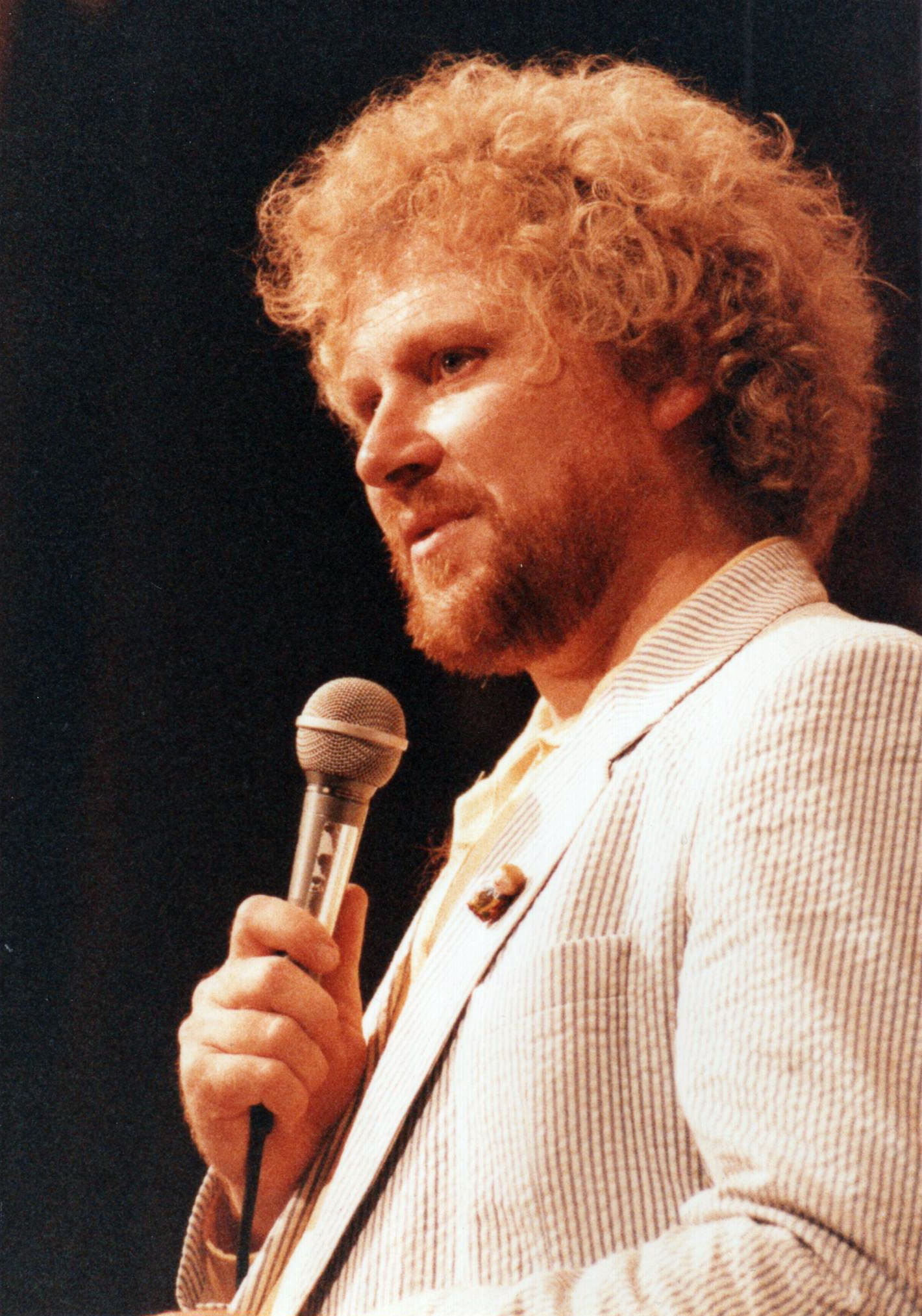
Baker at Whovent in September 1986

Baker made his Doctor Who debut as the antagonistic Time Lord Commander Maxil in Arc of Infinity (1983), who notably shoots the Fifth Doctor (Peter Davison) in the cliffhanger to "Part One". Davison later joked that Baker was going after his job. Baker was unavailable to reprise the role in "The Five Doctors" (1983); during the filming of that episode, Davison informed producer John Nathan-Turner that he was leaving Doctor Who. Nathan-Turner had initially chastised Baker for upstaging Davison with his "arch" performance, but after encountering Baker entertaining guests at the wedding of a mutual friend, he remarked to his partner Gary Downie "I think I may have found my new Doctor". Baker was offered the part on 10 June. Baker was delighted as he had assumed there was an "unwritten rule" that playing a different character on the series prohibited him from playing the Doctor. He had been a fan of the series since the 1960s, and considered applying for the lead role when Fourth Doctor actor Tom Baker left in 1980. His casting was announced on 19 August 1983, and the Sixth Doctor first appeared in the final moments of The Caves of Androzani (1984).

Baker was keen to emphasise the Doctor's alien behaviour, and the intention was for his brash and arrogant incarnation to mellow over time. Baker suggested a dark costume which would allow his Doctor to go unnoticed; ironically, he was dressed in a multi-coloured coat designed to be "totally tasteless". Neither fans nor critics reacted favourably to the Sixth Doctor's debut. His first full story The Twin Dilemma (1984) is often regarded as one of the worst in the history of the series. The new Doctor's unlikeability was established when, in a post-regeneration mood swing, he tries to strangle his companion Peri Brown (Nicola Bryant)—a scene widely condemned for its shock value. In 2010, PopMatters called his first appearance "just out-and-out dislikable, showcasing a hubris and harshness that was heretofore unseen in the Doctor's emotional canon." Due to concerns over season 22's overtly violent tone and lack of humour, production of the planned 1986 season was suspended in February 1985. Michael Grade, the controller of BBC1, personally disliked Doctor Who and criticised its outdated production values. (Note: Attributed to multiple sources) He reportedly described Baker's performance as "absolutely god-awful". During the 18-month hiatus, Baker and Bryant starred in the Doctor Who radio drama Slipback (1985). Both actors also contributed their vocals to "Doctor in Distress" (1985), a charity single produced to raise money for the National Society for Cancer Relief and support the series' return.

"Tom Baker did it for seven years. ... There's a part of me which likes to have a tilt at records. I would like to think that maybe I'd still be doing it in eight years' time. On the other hand... maybe three or four years of playing the Doctor is exhausting."

— Baker, July 1985

In September 1986, Doctor Who returned to television, with a reduced episode count, for season 23, known collectively as Trial of a Time Lord. The season's story arc, which involved the Doctor on trial for his crimes against Time Lord society, was a meta-textual reference to the series itself being "on trial". Grade and Jonathan Powell (BBC's Head of Series and Serials) took the new season's disappointing ratings as justification that Baker did not appeal to the public, and instructed Nathan-Turner to recast the Doctor. Davison later suggested that the executives wanted Nathan-Turner to resign as producer by forcing him to change the Doctor. In 2021, Toby Hadoke described Baker as "a fall guy for all the criticisms levelled at the show, which had nothing to do with him".

On 29 October, Nathan-Turner informed Baker over the phone that the Sixth Doctor would be replaced. Baker had signed a four-year contract, as the BBC initially hoped he would stay on for longer than Davison's three-year stint, but his two-season tenure as the Doctor was the shortest of any actor at that point. Baker was upset as there was much he still wanted to do with the role. Powell offered Baker a four-part story concluding in his character's regeneration. Baker argued for one more complete season, as he did not want to commit himself to only two weeks' work when he should be seeking out regular work elsewhere. Baker never heard back from Powell. The new Seventh Doctor, Sylvester McCoy, played the injured Sixth Doctor in the opening minutes of season 24's debut serial Time and the Rani (1987), his face hidden by visual effects as the regeneration process occurs. In a 2019 interview, Baker expressed regret for not returning for a regeneration scene, stating that he was feeling "hacked off" and not thinking about the fans.

==== Reprising the role ====
From June to August 1989, Baker succeeded Jon Pertwee as the Doctor in the stage play Doctor Who – The Ultimate Adventure. Baker reprised the role on television for the first time in the 1993 Children in Need charity special Dimensions in Time, alongside every surviving Doctor. In 1997, he provided dialogue for the BBC video game Doctor Who: Destiny of the Doctors. Baker and McCoy reprised their roles for a 2003 Dead Ringers Children in Need sketch where the Sixth and Seventh Doctors compete against alien foes on the game show Weakest Link. In 2003, Baker appeared on Top Gear in character as the Doctor. He competed in a lap of the Top Gear track against various drivers dressed as a Klingon, a Cyberman, a Dalek, Darth Vader and Ming the Merciless.

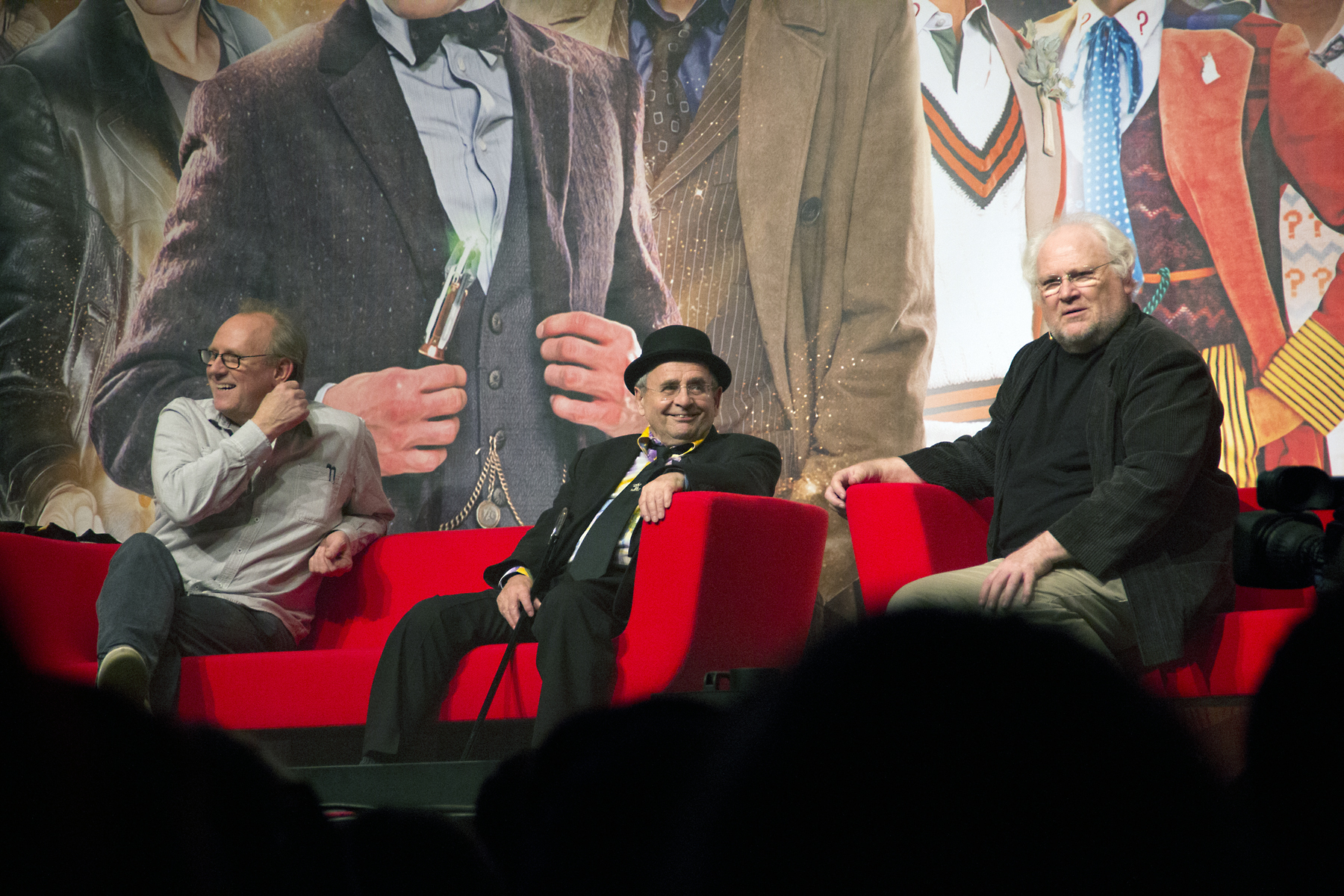
Peter Davison, Sylvester McCoy and Baker at the Doctor Who 50th Anniversary Celebration Weekend in 2013

In 1999, Baker appeared alongside Davison and McCoy in The Sirens of Time, the first of Big Finish Productions' licensed Doctor Who audio dramas. Baker regularly played the Sixth Doctor in Big Finish's Main Range series until its conclusion in March 2021, with the character's stories continuing in the ongoing series The Sixth Doctor Adventures. Big Finish gave Baker the chance to continue the Sixth Doctor's long-term character arc, which has rehabilitated the character's reputation. In a 2001 poll conducted by Doctor Who Magazine, Baker was voted the Best Audio Doctor. The 2015 audio drama The Last Adventure, which depicts the Sixth Doctor's final adventure before his regeneration, afforded Baker the send-off he was denied on-screen. Baker reprised the role of Commander Maxil in the Gallifrey episode "Appropriation" in 2006. In 2022, he played an alternate version of the Doctor ("the Warrior") in the Doctor Who Unbound series, and an elderly future version of the Doctor ("the Curator") in The Eighth Doctor Adventures.

In the 2022 television special "The Power of the Doctor", Baker returned for a cameo appearance alongside Davison, McCoy and Paul McGann as a manifestation of the Thirteenth Doctor's subconscious. Baker reprised his role as the Sixth Doctor in Tales of the TARDIS (2023) to mark Doctor Who's 60th anniversary.

==== Other involvement in Doctor Who media ====
Baker has written various published Doctor Who short stories, including "The Deal" (1991), "A Wee Deoch an ...?" (1991), "A Tourist Invasion" (1992) and "Interstitial Insecurity" (2019), all featuring the Sixth Doctor. In 1994 he wrote the comic story The Age of Chaos. He wrote and read the short story audiobook "The Wings of A Butterfly" for Big Finish. He presented the home video releases Cybermen – The Early Years and The Colin Baker Years. At Riverside Studios on 4 September 2011, Baker accepted the post of Honorary President of the Doctor Who Appreciation Society.

Baker starred in the comedy short film The Five(ish) Doctors Reboot (2013) as a fictionalised version of himself who assists Davison and McCoy in sneaking into the production of the 50th anniversary special "The Day of the Doctor". Since 2023, Baker hosts the Big Finish-produced podcast Into the TARDIS, which showcases fan-favourite Big Finish stories.

=== Later work ===
Baker's television work through the 1990s included guest appearances in Casualty (1989, 1998), The Knock (1997), Jonathan Creek (1997), The Famous Five (1997) and Sunburn (1999). He played Australian Army officer Harry George Chauvel in The Young Indiana Jones Chronicles. He also appeared on Hollyoaks (2000), Doctors (2001, 2006, 2011), Telling Tales (2004), The Afternoon Play (2006), Kingdom (2008) and Hustle (2010). He guest-starred in a 2021 episode of Emmerdale.

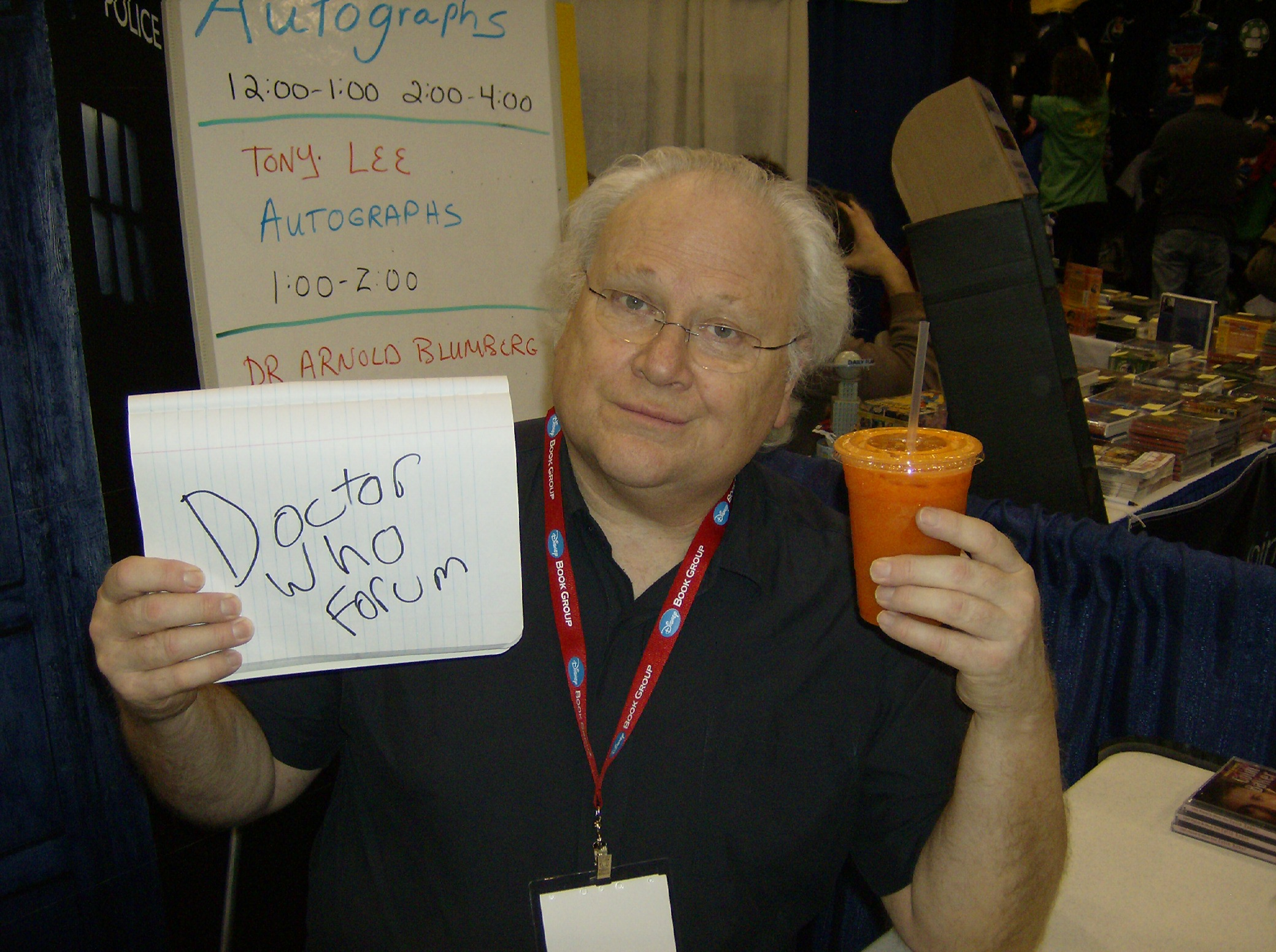
Baker at New York Comic Con in 2008

From 1991 to 1995, Baker played ersatz Doctor in the direct-to-video film series The Stranger, produced by BBV Productions. He also appeared in the BBV films The Airzone Solution (1993) and The Zero Imperative (1994), alongside former Doctor Who actors Davison, McCoy and Jon Pertwee. His other films include The Harpist (1997), The Asylum (2000) and A Dozen Summers (2015).

Baker's non-Doctor Who audio drama work for Big Finish includes the Sapphire & Steel series (based on the television series of the same name) and Earthsearch: Mindwarp (based on James Follet's Earthsearch). In 2021, he reprised the role of Bayban in Big Finish's box set Bayban the Butcher.

In 1998 Baker appeared as the resident celebrity in "Dictionary Corner" on the game show Countdown. In 2000 he appeared on The Generation Game dressed as the Doctor. Baker appeared in series 3 of the sketch show Little Britain, though his scenes are only available on the DVD release. He participated in the 2012 series of I'm a Celebrity...Get Me Out of Here!, finishing in 8th place.

Baker has appeared in various stage productions across the United Kingdom, particularly pantomimes. In 2010, he became the first actor to portray Inspector Morse on stage in House of Ghosts. He also played Sherlock Holmes in on-stage radio adaptations of The Hound of the Baskervilles and The Sign of the Four. (Note: Attributed to multiple sources)

== Personal life ==
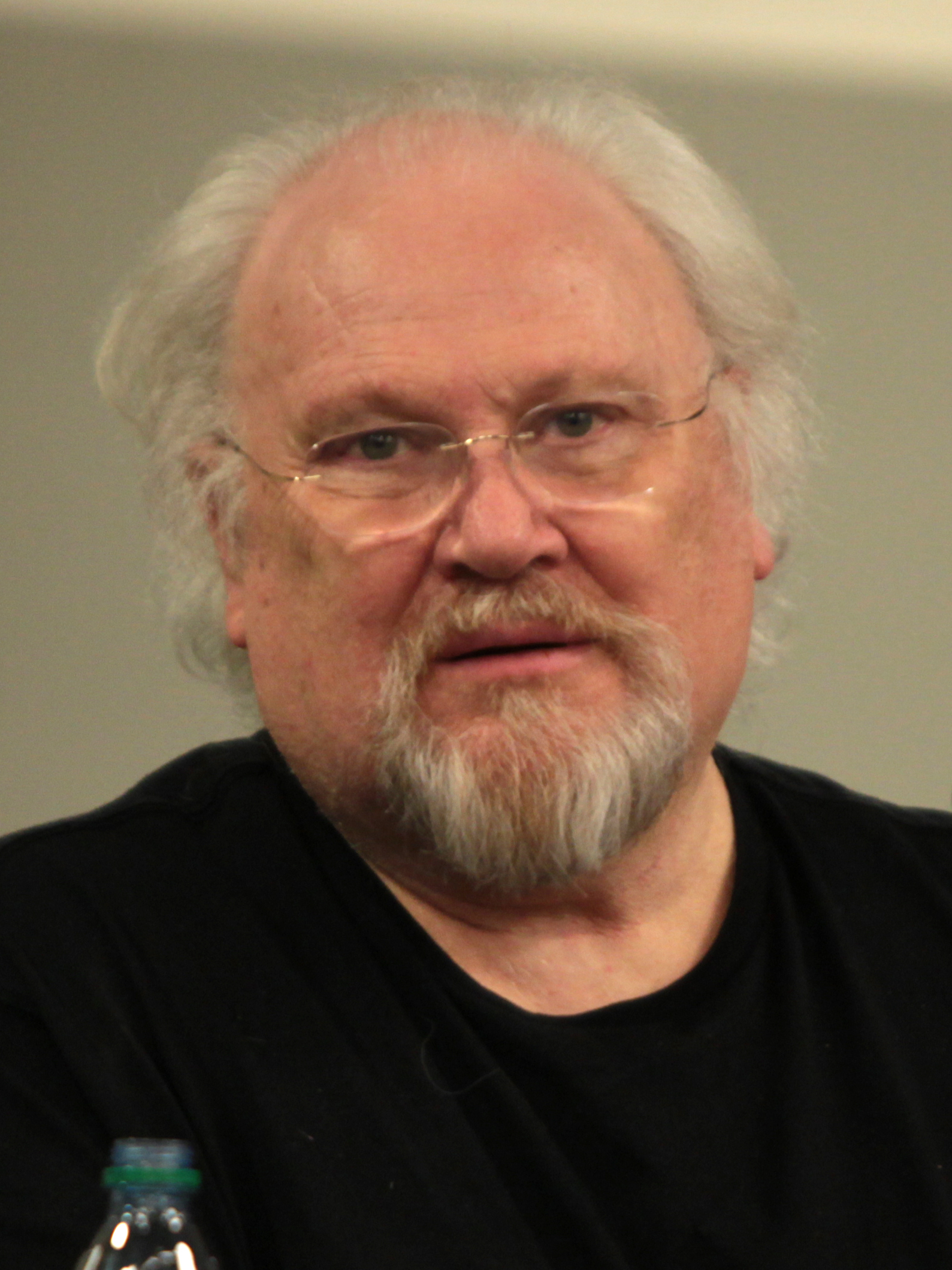
Baker at the 2014 Phoenix Comicon Fan Fest

Baker married actress Liza Goddard (who played his on-screen wife in The Brothers) in July 1976, becoming stepfather to Goddard's 1-year-old son. They divorced 18 months later.

Baker married actress Marion Wyatt in 1982. They have four daughters. Baker and Wyatt had a son who died of sudden infant death syndrome in 1983. In 1996, Baker became the Chairman of the Foundation for the Study of Infant Deaths.

Baker is a friend of American writer Stephen R. Donaldson, who dedicated his 1991 novel Forbidden Knowledge to him.

In September 2015, Baker received an honorary doctorate from Buckinghamshire New University.

From 1995 to 2019, Baker wrote a regular weekly column for local newspaper Bucks Free Press. Three collections of his articles have been published: Look Who's Talking, Second Thoughts and Sixth Sense.

In August 2022, Baker was banned from driving for 21 days, after he was charged with travelling at 58 mph (93 km/h) in a 30 mph (48 km/h) zone in November 2021.

=== Political views ===
Writing for Bucks Free Press in 2015, Baker stated that he "would love to live in a marginal constituency" and championed the democratic process.

In 2019, he called the cost of building High Speed 2 "obscenely unjustifiable given all the other more pressing demands on the public purse". He also stated: "I believe that Brexit need not have turned into the almighty pigs' breakfast had Parliament cared more about democracy than personal or party electability."

Baker is a critic of fox hunting and was among more than 20 high-profile people who signed a letter to members of parliament in 2015 to oppose Conservative prime minister David Cameron's plan to amend the Hunting Act 2004.

== Bibliography ==
=== Collections ===
- Look Who's Talking (Hirst Books), First Published December 2009. First reprint February 2010 ISBN 978-0-9557149-2-4
- Second Thoughts (Hirst Books), First Published September 2010 ISBN 978-0-9566417-6-2
- Gallimaufry: A Collection of Short Stories. First Published 30 September 2011. ISBN 1-907959-02-5.
- Sixth Sense – from the columns of the Bucks Free Press. FBS Publishing Ltd. 6 April 2017. ISBN 978-0993204371

=== Comics ===
- Doctor Who: The Age of Chaos (1994, Marvel UK)

=== Short stories ===
- "A Wee Deoch an ...?" (1991, in Doctor Who Magazine Winter Special of 1991)
- "The Deal" (1991, in Doctor Who Yearbook 1992)
- "A Tourist Invasion" (1992, in Doctor Who Yearbook 1993)
- "The Wings of a Butterfly" (2010, in Short Trips – Volume 1)
- "Interstitial Insecurity" (2019, in The Target Storybook)
