= Doctor Who season 20 =

1983 season of British sci-fi TV series

Doctor Who
- Season 20
- Cover art of the Blu-ray release for the complete season
- Starring: Peter Davison; Sarah Sutton; Janet Fielding; Mark Strickson; Gerald Flood; Richard Hurndall; Patrick Troughton; Jon Pertwee; Elisabeth Sladen; Carole Ann Ford; Nicholas Courtney
- No. of stories: 6
- No. of episodes: 22 (+1 special)

Release
- Original network: BBC1
- Original release: 3 January – 16 March 1983
- Original release: 25 November 1983 (special)

Season chronology
- ← Previous; Season 19 Next → Season 21

The twentieth season of British science fiction television series Doctor Who began on 3 January 1983 with the story Arc of Infinity, and ended 16 March 1983 with The King's Demons. A 20th Anniversary special, "The Five Doctors", followed in November 1983. John Nathan-Turner produced this series, with Eric Saward script editing.

== Casting ==
=== Main cast ===
- Peter Davison as the Fifth Doctor
- Sarah Sutton as Nyssa
- Janet Fielding as Tegan Jovanka
- Mark Strickson as Vislor Turlough
- Gerald Flood as Voice of Kamelion
- Richard Hurndall as the First Doctor
- Patrick Troughton as the Second Doctor
- Jon Pertwee as the Third Doctor
- Elisabeth Sladen as Sarah Jane Smith
- Carole Ann Ford as Susan Foreman
- Nicholas Courtney as Brigadier Lethbridge-Stewart

Peter Davison continues as the Doctor, accompanied by Tegan Jovanka (Janet Fielding). While Nyssa (Sarah Sutton) leaves halfway through the season in Terminus, Mark Strickson arrives as new companion Vislor Turlough in Mawdryn Undead. In the penultimate serial of the season, the shape-shifting android Kamelion (voiced by Gerald Flood) is invited aboard the TARDIS after the Doctor frees him from the Master. Kamelion accepts, though the character itself would only be seen again in Season 21's antepenultimate serial, Planet of Fire.

Past Doctors return for the 20th Anniversary special, with Patrick Troughton and Jon Pertwee appearing as the Second Doctor and Third Doctor. The First Doctor returns, played by Richard Hurndall as original actor William Hartnell died in 1975. Tom Baker was asked to return to play the Fourth Doctor but declined.

Past companions Elisabeth Sladen (Sarah Jane Smith), Nicholas Courtney (Brigadier Lethbridge-Stewart), Carole Ann Ford (Susan Foreman) return for the 20th Anniversary special, whilst Courtney also makes an appearance in Mawdryn Undead.

=== Recurring actors ===
- Anthony Ainley as The Master
- Valentine Dyall as the Black Guardian
- Paul Jerricho as The Castellan

Anthony Ainley returns as the Master in The King's Demons and "The Five Doctors".

The Black Guardian, played by Valentine Dyall, also makes a return in Mawdryn Undead, Terminus and Enlightenment.

The Castellan, played by Paul Jerricho, appears in Arc of Infinity and reprises the role in "The Five Doctors".

=== Guest stars ===
Additional companions Jamie McCrimmon (Frazer Hines), Zoe Heriot (Wendy Padbury), Liz Shaw (Caroline John) and Mike Yates (Richard Franklin) make cameos throughout the special.

David Banks makes his second of four appearances in the show in "The Five Doctors" as a Cyber-leader.

Colin Baker, who was subsequently cast as the Sixth Doctor, made his first appearance in Doctor Who as Commander Maxil in the season's first serial, Arc of Infinity, becoming the first actor to appear in the programme prior to taking on the role of the Doctor.

=== Returning villains ===
Returning villains for the season are Omega (Arc of Infinity), The Black Guardian (Mawdryn Undead), (Terminus), (Enlightenment), Cybermen ("The Five Doctors") and The Mara (Snakedance). A lone Dalek and a lone Yeti appear briefly in "The Five Doctors". The Master is the main villain in ‘’The King’s Demons’’ and also appears in The Five Doctors.

== Development ==
Multiple stories, including The Parasites by Bill Lyons, Way Down Yonder by Lesley Elizabeth Thomas, and an untitled storyline by Tanith Lee, were all scrapped from this season. Song of the Space Whale, by Pat Mills and John Wagner, was considered for this season after being previously scrapped from the series, though disagreements led to it being scrapped again. It would ultimately be entirely scrapped by 1985.

== Serials ==
To commemorate the twentieth season, the stories in this season involve the return of characters or villains seen in previous seasons. This season was broadcast twice weekly on Tuesday and Wednesday evenings on BBC1. It includes The Black Guardian Trilogy, consisting of the serials Mawdryn Undead, Terminus and Enlightenment and involving the arrival of Turlough, the departure of Nyssa and a single guest appearance from Brigadier Lethbridge-Stewart. Overall, these serials form a rough twelve-part epic.

Although "The Five Doctors" was broadcast more than eight months after Part 2 of The King's Demons, which was the last regular story of the season, it is usually included as part of Season 20.

No. story	No. in season	Serial title	Episode titles	Directed by	Written by	Original release date	Prod. code	UK viewers (millions)	AI
123	1	Arc of Infinity	"Part One"	Ron Jones	Johnny Byrne	3 January 1983	6E	7.2	69
123	1	Arc of Infinity	"Part Two"	Ron Jones	Johnny Byrne	5 January 1983	6E	7.3	70
123	1	Arc of Infinity	"Part Three"	Ron Jones	Johnny Byrne	11 January 1983	6E	6.9	67
123	1	Arc of Infinity	"Part Four"	Ron Jones	Johnny Byrne	12 January 1983	6E	7.2	66
The Doctor's bio-data extract is stolen from the Matrix on Gallifrey. Soon after, a being from an anti-matter universe begins to genetically bond with the Doctor. He and Nyssa return to Gallifrey, only for the High Council to order his execution – while on Earth, unbeknownst to her friends, Tegan's search for her missing cousin in Amsterdam is somehow tied into the events as well. It is left to Nyssa to uncover the identity of a traitor on the High Council, and to unveil the enemy manipulating the Doctor – an entity who has long thirsted for revenge against both the Doctor and the Time Lords themselves.
124	2	Snakedance	"Part One"	Fiona Cumming	Christopher Bailey	18 January 1983	6D	6.7	65
124	2	Snakedance	"Part Two"	Fiona Cumming	Christopher Bailey	19 January 1983	6D	7.7	66
124	2	Snakedance	"Part Three"	Fiona Cumming	Christopher Bailey	25 January 1983	6D	6.6	67
124	2	Snakedance	"Part Four"	Fiona Cumming	Christopher Bailey	26 January 1983	6D	7.4	67
The Mara once again takes control of Tegan's mind and compels her to direct the TARDIS to Manussa, seat of its once-mighty empire. Generations earlier, the Mara was driven off Manussa with the use of the Great Crystal, a device which enhances its users' mental abilities. Now, the Mara intends to use the Crystal to return to power. It is up to the Doctor to unearth the terrible origins of the Mara, and seek out the one man who can show him how to defeat the Mara in psychic combat.
125	3	Mawdryn Undead	"Part One"	Peter Moffatt	Peter Grimwade	1 February 1983	6F	6.5	67
125	3	Mawdryn Undead	"Part Two"	Peter Moffatt	Peter Grimwade	2 February 1983	6F	7.5	70
125	3	Mawdryn Undead	"Part Three"	Peter Moffatt	Peter Grimwade	8 February 1983	6F	7.4	67
125	3	Mawdryn Undead	"Part Four"	Peter Moffatt	Peter Grimwade	9 February 1983	6F	7.7	68
An alien named Turlough lives in secret amongst boys at an English boarding school where the Brigadier is now teaching maths. He is contacted by the Black Guardian, who wants him to kill the Doctor. The TARDIS, meanwhile, has brought the Doctor, Nyssa and Tegan to a space station trapped in a warp ellipse. It serves as a prison for a team of scientists led by Mawdryn, who tried to steal the secrets of the Time Lords and instead placed him and scientists in a state of perpetual regeneration. It is up to the Doctor to find some way to help Mawdryn, but doing so may cost him his remaining regenerations.
126	4	Terminus	"Part One"	Mary Ridge	Stephen Gallagher	15 February 1983 (Note: Terminus, "Part One" was first broadcast 14 February 1983 in Wales)	6G	6.8	65
126	4	Terminus	"Part Two"	Mary Ridge	Stephen Gallagher	16 February 1983	6G	7.5	67
126	4	Terminus	"Part Three"	Mary Ridge	Stephen Gallagher	22 February 1983	6G	6.5	64
126	4	Terminus	"Part Four"	Mary Ridge	Stephen Gallagher	23 February 1983	6G	7.4	67
Turlough's sabotage causes the TARDIS to make an emergency landing on a space station called Terminus, where victims of the horrible, virulent Lazar disease go to die. The Doctor discovers that Terminus is powered by two enormous engines, one of which exploded long ago, an event which instigated the Big Bang and the creation of the universe. Now the other engine is on the brink of detonating as well – an event which will have cataclysmic consequences for the cosmos.
127	5	Enlightenment	"Part One"	Fiona Cumming	Barbara Clegg	1 March 1983	6H	6.6	67
127	5	Enlightenment	"Part Two"	Fiona Cumming	Barbara Clegg	2 March 1983	6H	7.2	65
127	5	Enlightenment	"Part Three"	Fiona Cumming	Barbara Clegg	8 March 1983	6H	6.2	68
127	5	Enlightenment	"Part Four"	Fiona Cumming	Barbara Clegg	9 March 1983	6H	7.3	70
Under the failing influence of the White Guardian, the TARDIS materialises on what appears to be an Edwardian racing yacht. It is soon revealed to be a cleverly disguised spacecraft, competing in an interplanetary race. The competitors are Eternals, immortal beings incapable of imagination or creative thought, while the crew are mortals, upon whose minds the Eternals draw for inspiration. The prize in the race is Enlightenment, offered up by the Black and White Guardians. One of the Eternals, the vicious Captain Wrack, is in league with the Black Guardian, however, and will stop at nothing to win.
128	6	The King's Demons	"Part One"	Tony Virgo	Terence Dudley	15 March 1983	6J	5.8	65
128	6	The King's Demons	"Part Two"	Tony Virgo	Terence Dudley	16 March 1983	6J	7.2	63
The Doctor, Tegan and Turlough find themselves in 1215 England. They arrive at the castle of Ranulf Fitzwilliam, and are astounded to find King John there too, especially since he is supposed to be in London at the same time, involved in the events which will lead to the signing of Magna Carta. The time travellers discover that the King is not who he claims – in fact, he is a shapechanging robot named Kamelion under the influence of the Master, who is trying to irreversibly pervert the course of Earth's history.
Special
129	–	"The Five Doctors"	N/A	Peter Moffatt	Terrance Dicks	25 November 1983 (Note: The Five Doctors was first broadcast in the United States on 23 November 1983, the actual date of the programme's 20th anniversary.)	6K	7.7	75
While the Fourth Doctor and Romana are trapped in a time eddy, the First, Second, Third and Fifth Doctors – together with many of their companions – are lured by a mysterious figure to the forbidden Death Zone on Gallifrey. There they make their way towards the Dark Tower in which Rassilon is entombed, encountering a number of their deadliest foes en route. When the Fifth Doctor finds a way to teleport himself to the Capitol, however, he uncovers evidence of a traitor on the High Council. All are embroiled in the Game of Rassilon, whose prize is immortality itself.

== Broadcast ==
The regular season was broadcast from 3 January to 16 March 1983. Transmission moved to Tuesdays and Wednesdays, with the exception of the first episode of Arc of Infinity airing on a Monday. The 20th anniversary special, The Five Doctors, was broadcast on 25 November 1983, a Friday, as part of Children in Need.

On BBC1 Wales, Part One of Terminus aired on Monday 14 February 1983, one day earlier than the rest of the UK.

== Home media ==
=== VHS releases ===
Season	Story no.	Serial name	Duration	Release date		
Season	Story no.	Serial name	Duration	UK	Australia	USA / Canada
20	123	Arc of Infinity	4 × 25 min.	March 1994	April 1994	September 1995
20	124	Snakedance	4 × 25 min.	December 1994	February 1995	September 1996
20	125	Mawdryn Undead	4 × 25 min.	November 1992	May 1993	February 1994
20	126	Terminus	4 × 25 min.	February 1993	June 1993	May 1994
20	127	Enlightenment	4 × 25 min.	February 1993	May 1993	August 1994
20	128; 129	The King's Demons "The Five Doctors" - Special Edition	2 × 25 min. 1 × 100 min.	November 1995; 2 × VHS	July 1997; 2 × VHS	February 1997; 2 × VHS
20	129	"The Five Doctors"	1 × 90 min.	September 1985; July 1990	May 1988	March 1989

=== Betamax releases ===
Season	Story no.	Serial name	Duration	Release date		
Season	Story no.	Serial name	Duration	UK	Australia	USA / Canada
20	129	"The Five Doctors"	1 × 90 min.	September 1985	—N/a	—N/a

=== Laserdisc releases ===
Season	Story no.	Serial name	Duration	Release date		
Season	Story no.	Serial name	Duration	UK	Australia	USA / Canada
20	130	"The Five Doctors"	1 × 90 min.	—N/a	—N/a	24 August 1994

=== DVD and Blu-ray releases ===
All releases are for DVD unless otherwise indicated:

- ^{(B)} indicates a Blu-ray release

Season	Story no.	Serial name	Duration	Release date		
Season	Story no.	Serial name	Duration	R2	R4	R1
20	123	Arc of Infinity (Note: Only available as part of the Time-Flight/Arc of Infinity box set in Regions 2 and 4. Only available individually in Region 1.)	4 × 25 min.	6 August 2007	5 September 2007	6 November 2007
20	124	Snakedance (Note: Only available as part of the Mara Tales box set in Regions 2 and 4. Only available individually in Region 1.)	4 × 25 min.	7 March 2011	7 April 2011	12 April 2011
20	125–127	Mawdryn Undead; Terminus; Enlightenment	12 × 25 min. (Note: Known collectively as The Black Guardian Trilogy. Each serial comprises four episodes.); 1 × 75 min. (Note: The 75-minute long episode is an Enlightenment Special Edition)	10 August 2009	5 November 2009	3 November 2009
20	128	The King's Demons (Note: Only available as part of the Kamelion Tales box set in Regions 2 and 4. Only available individually in Region 1.)	2 × 25 min.	14 June 2010	5 August 2010	7 September 2010
20	129	"The Five Doctors" (Special Edition)	1 × 100 min. (Note: "Special edition" of "The Five Doctors" with restored footage and new special effects)	1 November 1999	9 October 2000	11 September 2001
20	129	"The Five Doctors" (25th Anniversary Edition)	1 × 90 min. (Note: Broadcast version of "The Five Doctors"); 1 × 100 min.	3 March 2008	5 June 2008	5 August 2008
20	123–129	Complete Season 20 (Note: Released as Doctor Who: The Collection – Season 20 in Region B. Released as Doctor Who – Peter Davison: Complete Season Two in Region A.)	22 × 25 min. 1 × 90 min. 1 × 100 min.	18 September 2023 ^{(B)}	24 July 2024 ^{(B)}	4 June 2024 ^{(B)}

== In print ==
Season	Story no.	Library no. (Note: Number in Target's Doctor Who Library, if applicable)	Novelisation title	Author	Hardcover release date (Note: Published by Target's parent companies (Allen Wingate, W. H. Allen, BBC Books) unless otherwise indicated)	Paperback release date (Note: Published by Target Books (or by BBC Books under the Target Collection umbrella) unless otherwise indicated)	Audiobook	
Season	Story no.	Library no.	Novelisation title	Author	Hardcover release date	Paperback release date	Release date (Note: Unabridged from BBC Audio / AudioGo unless otherwise indicated)	Narrator
20	123	80	Arc of Infinity	Terrance Dicks	21 July 1983	20 October 1983	3 June 2021	Geoffrey Beevers
20	124	83	Snakedance	Terrance Dicks	21 January 1984	19 April 1984	6 February 2025	Geoffrey Beevers
20	125	82	Mawdryn Undead	Peter Grimwade	18 August 1983	12 January 1984	5 July 2018	David Collings
20	126	79	Terminus	Stephen Gallagher (as John Lydecker)	16 June 1983	15 September 1983	1 August 2019	Steven Pacey
20	127	85	Enlightenment	Barbara Clegg	16 February 1984	24 May 1984	3 September 2020	Steven Pacey
20	128	108	The King's Demons	Terence Dudley	20 February 1986	10 July 1986	5 May 2016	Mark Strickson
20	129	81	The Five Doctors	Terrance Dicks	24 November 1983		2 November 2017	Jon Culshaw (Note: Dalek and Cyberman voices by Nicholas Briggs)
