= Enlightenment (Doctor Who) =

1983 Doctor Who serial

127 – Enlightenment
- Doctor Who serial
- The ships are revealed to be floating in space. The serial's visual effects and imagery were praised by critics.

Cast
- Doctor: Peter Davison – Fifth Doctor
- Companions: Janet Fielding – Tegan Jovanka; Mark Strickson – Vislor Turlough
- Others: Cyril Luckham – White Guardian; Valentine Dyall – Black Guardian; Keith Barron – Striker; Christopher Brown – Marriner; Lynda Baron – Wrack; Leee John – Mansell; James McClure – First Officer; Tony Caunter – Jackson; Clive Kneller – Collier; Pat Gorman – Grogan (uncredited)

Production
- Directed by: Fiona Cumming
- Written by: Barbara Clegg
- Script editor: Eric Saward
- Produced by: John Nathan-Turner
- Executive producer: None
- Music by: Malcolm Clarke
- Production code: 6H
- Series: Season 20
- Running time: 4 episodes, 25 minutes each
- First broadcast: 1 March 1983
- Last broadcast: 9 March 1983

Chronology
← Preceded by Terminus	Followed by → The King's Demons

Enlightenment is the fifth serial of the 20th season of the British science fiction television series Doctor Who, which was originally broadcast in four twice-weekly parts on BBC1 from 1 to 9 March 1983. It was the 127th serial of the series, and was written by Barbara Clegg and directed by Fiona Cumming, making it the first Doctor Who story to be both written and directed by women.

In the serial, the alien time traveller the Fifth Doctor (Peter Davison) and his companions, Tegan Jovanka (Janet Fielding) and Vislor Turlough (Mark Strickson), encounter a group of god-like immortals who are racing historical sailing vessels from Earth through space, crewed by humans they had plucked out of time, in an attempt to win the prize of enlightenment. Turlough is under the control of the Black Guardian (Valentine Dyall), but struggles with the Guardian's orders to kill the Doctor. Enlightenment is the third of three loosely connected serials where the Black Guardian attempts to compel Turlough to kill the Doctor.

The serial's production was beset by problems caused by industrial action taken by electricians at the BBC during filming. It was eventually finished three months behind schedule, but the unavailability of several actors for new filming dates forced the production team to recast their parts at short notice. Enlightenment averaged 6.8 million viewers per episode on its first transmission and received generally positive reviews from critics, who praised the serial's writing, direction and visual effects, as well as Keith Barron's performance. Reviewers, however, were some of the other performances, with Leee John's in particular being negatively received, alongside the serial's climax.

== Plot ==
Following interference from the White and Black Guardians, the Doctor materialises the TARDIS in the hold of an Edwardian yacht; the human crew know little, except that they are in a race. The Doctor and his companions, Tegan and Turlough, discover that the yacht and other historical ships are racing via solar sail through the Solar System. The ship's officers reveal themselves to be Eternals, immortal creatures, who manipulate mortals, whom they call "Ephemerals", for entertainment, and have kidnapped the crew from their own time. The Guardians arranged the race and the prize is Enlightenment, knowledge of everything. The Eternals disappear the TARDIS, forcing the Doctor and his companions to stay for the race.

As the race continues, several vessels are destroyed by explosions. The Doctor suspects The Buccaneer, a 17th-century pirate ship. Turlough, attempting to escape control of the Black Guardian, ends up aboard The Buccaneer, and meets the Eternal Captain Wrack. He offers to join her and learns she too is working for the Black Guardian. He finds the device destroying the ships. Wrack offers the Edwardian officers a reception aboard her ship, where Wrack hypnotizes Tegan and implants a red crystal in her tiara. When the race continues, the Doctor sees The Buccaneer nearing the yacht, determines that the crystal is used as the weapon's target, and throws the tiara overboard before the ship is destroyed.

Nearing the end of the race, The Buccaneer pulls ahead of the yacht. Not wishing to see Wrack win, the Eternals return the TARDIS to the Doctor, allowing him to travel to The Buccaneer, though Tegan is forced to stay. However, he is captured, and Wrack's first mate Mansell suggests that the Doctor be thrown overboard. Just before The Buccaneer crosses the finish line, Wrack and Mansell are ejected. The ships and their human crews are returned to Earth and the other Eternals are dismissed. The Doctor wins the race, as he was the captain following the ejection. The Doctor refuses the prize, a diamond, but as Turlough helped the Doctor, he is entitled to it. The Black Guardian reminds Turlough of their bargain, and says that he can give up the diamond, or sacrifice the Doctor to gain both Enlightenment and the TARDIS. Turlough hurls the diamond at the Black Guardian, who vanishes in flames, ending his control. The Doctor points out that Enlightenment was the choice, not the diamond.

== Production ==
=== Conception and writing ===
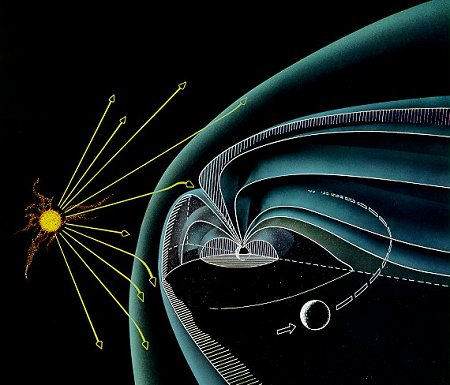
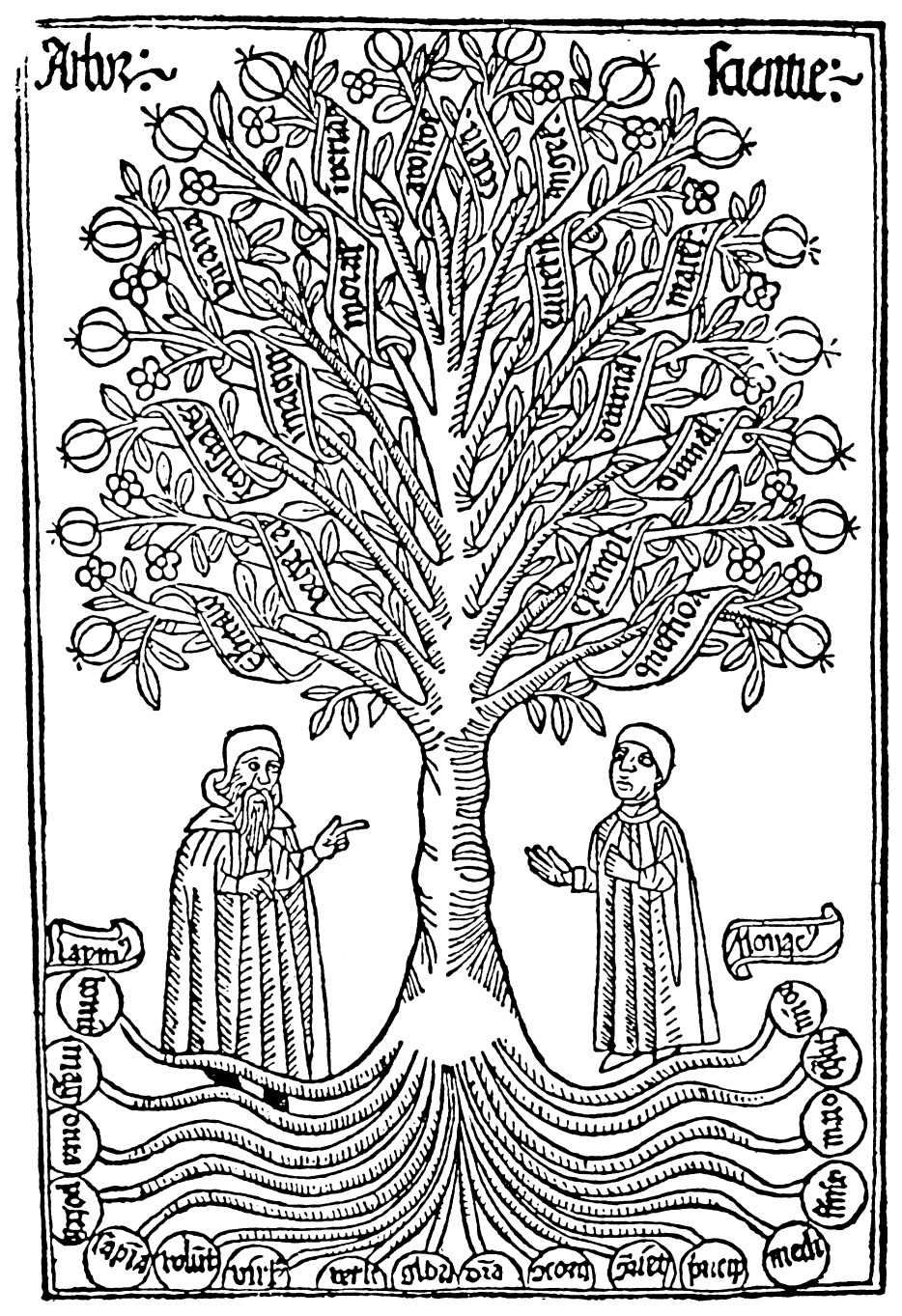
Clegg drew inspiration for Enlightenment from solar winds and the Tree of Knowledge.

After penning a number of radio and TV scripts, including episodes of Crossroads and Waggoner's Walk, Barbara Clegg submitted a story idea to Doctor Who script editor Eric Saward, an acquaintance from the BBC drama department. Interested in writing for the series, Clegg had been inspired when distant relatives had stayed with her and demanded constant entertainment during their visit, basing the character of the Eternals upon them. Clegg additionally drew inspiration from the Bible's Book of Genesis, deriving the prize of enlightenment from the Tree of Knowledge. Having read about solar winds, she decided to use them as the basis of propulsion for space vessels. Initially titled The Enlighteners, her submission involved ships racing through space. Saward and series producer John Nathan-Turner liked Clegg's ideas, and they commissioned the script in September 1981. The first episode was delivered by Clegg in October and the three following episodes were commissioned in January 1982. The first draft of Part One did not contain any of the material concerning the Guardians, and Turlough was a peripheral figure, with the script focussing on the relationship between Marriner and Tegan. Parts 2 and 3 were delivered the following month and the final part in March.

To commemorate the show's anniversary, every story during Season 20 included the return of an enemy from the Doctor's past. The serial was now scheduled to conclude a three-story trilogy featuring the Black Guardian, which were duly written into the scripts by Clegg on Saward's request. The character was last encountered by the Fourth Doctor at the conclusion of The Key to Time saga in the 1979 serial The Armageddon Factor. The story also saw the return of the White Guardian, who had also not been seen since 1979. By Spring 1982 there were problems with a script by Pat Mills, The Song of the Space Whale, which had been intended to open the Black Guardian trilogy. Mills' script was eventually dropped and the production team considered moving The Enlighteners forward in the season to replace it, necessitating considerable re-writes. Peter Grimwade was eventually commissioned to write Mawdryn Undead to replace The Song of the Space Whale, and The Enlighteners was confirmed as the fifth serial of the season. In August, Saward had written to Clegg that he tweaked the scripts for Parts One and Three, but required a longer fourth part, which Clegg delivered later that month.

With pre-production underway, Saward changed the story title to Enlightenment in September 1982, a title he felt was more enigmatic. Saward also rewrote portions of the script pertaining to the story-arc, particularly the final confrontation scenes at the end of Part Four. Peter Moffatt had been originally scheduled as the serial's director, but following the problems with the Space Whale script he was asked to helm its replacement due to his experience, and so Fiona Cumming was asked to take over Enlightenment. This would mark the first time that a Doctor Who story was both written and directed by a woman. Cumming required a name for Striker's ship for the uniforms, inventing the name SS Shadow. Once rehearsals began for the second filming block, it became apparent that Part One and Part Two were under-running so more dialogue was written to fill in the time. It was originally intended that the character of Jackson would not reappear after the second episode, but during filming Saward became concerned that it appeared that he had been executed and so he and Clegg rewrote Part Three to include him. Part Three also looked to be under running so scenes from Part Four were brought forward and the final scenes with the Guardians were extended to compensate. Cumming had also notified Nathan-Turner that the main cast were dissatisfied with their characters; Peter Davison disliked the ongoing dynamic between the Doctor and his companions, to which Nathan-Turner told the cast to come up with their own better relation.

=== Casting ===
Leee John was hired on short notice, without acting experience.

Cumming came up with the idea that the Eternals would not blink and cast actors who she believed could provide detached performances. Cumming recalled Peter Sallis had played a similarly detached character in the 1974 BBC drama The Pallisers, and she cast him in the role of Striker. He had previously appeared Doctor Who as Penley in the serial The Ice Warriors (1967). Sallis was present during the rehearsals for the serial but when production was delayed he was unavailable for the new filming dates, being committed to filming Last of the Summer Wine, and was forced to drop out of the production, being replaced by Keith Barron. Michael Jayston, Nigel Hawthorne and Donald Houston were all offered the role, prior to Barron's acceptance. Lynda Baron was cast as Captain Wrack, having previously participated in Doctor Who in the 1966 serial The Gunfighters as the voice that sings the "Ballad of the Last Chance Saloon" heard throughout that story. Tony Caunter, who had previously played Thatcher in The Crusade (1965) and Morgan in Colony in Space (1971), was given the role of Jackson, with Christopher Brown and David Rhule being cast as Marriner and Wrack's sidekick Mansell respectively. Similarly to Sallis, David Rhule was unavailable for the revised filming dates in January, so singer Leee John replaced him at short notice, despite having no previous acting experience.

Valentine Dyall had originally played the Black Guardian in the 1979 serial The Armageddon Factor, the character's first appearance in the series, and reprised the role for season 20, appearing in Mawdryn Undead, Terminus (both 1983) and Enlightenment. Similarly, Cyril Luckham reprised the role of the White Guardian that he had previously played in the 1979 serial The Ribos Operation.

=== Design ===
The sets were designed by the set designer for Death to the Daleks (1974), Colin Green. The interior sets of the boats were not built specifically for the programme, but were pulled together from stock items from various prop warehouses. Cumming had originally hoped to simulate the rocking of the ships by mounting the sets on rollers but the idea was dropped due to costs, with the effect achieved by moving the cameras instead. The photo of Tegan's Aunt Vanessa, one of the items created by Marriner from the contents of her mind, was shot specifically for the filming, requiring Dolore Whiteman (who had played the character in Logopolis) to be contracted for a one-day photoshoot. The models of the boats, used in the racing sequences, were props sourced by visual effects designer Mike Kelt following extensive research at the National Maritime Museum. Most of the ships were loaned from prop houses, including one from the museum, though the Greek ship was created for the serial. The ships were mounted on rods for filming, while the oars were battery operated. The model of Davey's ship remained intact, with its explosion being a filmed effect that was edited into the sequence. Models of Venus and asteroids were created out of polystyrene, with Venus' haze being created using a bar heater off camera. The harbour was created out of acrylic glass and lit using Front Axial Projection. The same lighting effect would be used to light the Enlightenment diamond. Kelt was shocked by the dilapidated state of the TARDIS console prop, and was worried about damaging it while filming the explosion from Part One, and asked producer John Nathan-Turner if he could replace it but was told there was no money available.

Enlightenment's costumes were designed by Dinah Collin, who had previously worked on Earthshock (1982). The anachronistic wetsuits on the Edwardian ship were actually heavy-duty overalls that had been painted black. The spacesuits were designed by an external contractor, Imagineering, with whom Collin had worked with for Earthshock. Janet Fielding struggled with the low-cut ball gown she wore during filming as it threatened to expose her breasts on a number of occasions. The ball gown worn by Baron was made especially for the serial and was the most expensive costume on display. Baron's outfit was inspired by historical clothes of female pirates. The crew outfits were designed Collin, who had researched period-accurate costumes for the occasion. Make-up was done by designer Carolyn Perry, who had worked on The Visitation (1982). The newspaper found by the Doctor in Part One was a reprint of The Times from September 1901, while the food and drink served during the party scenes was all real, although the cast were not allowed to consume it.

=== Filming ===
The serial began principal filming in early November 1982, with filming divided into two main blocks. The first block was shot on film at Ealing Studios between 3–5 November and consisted of scenes on the decks of The Shadow and The Bucanneer. During the final day of the first block, actor Mark Strickson was injured while filming the scene of Turlough throwing himself overboard, when the Kirby wire he was suspended from broke, leaving him only able to walk with difficulty for several weeks. The studio work was scheduled to run from 6 November until mid December and consisted of all the interior scenes and those in the TARDIS.

In late October, the electricians union, EEPTU, had begun strike action which disrupted the filming of a number of BBC productions. The strike potentially meant that the final three serials of the season, including Enlightenment, would have to be abandoned. The electricians dispute was settled by December, but it had badly affected the series recording schedule, as it created a backlog. In spite of the strike, filming for model shots continued from 8 to 12 November. The camera was moved alongside the static model ships to give the effect of movement. The crew were able to shoot the following serial The King's Demons (1983) on schedule, (Note: The location shoots were completed on time, but the studio time was used to finish Terminus (1983). The King's Demons would be finished 1 day before Enlightenment's remount.) meaning that there was only one recording block left for the part-completed Enlightenment and Eric Saward's season finale; The Return. It was decided that Enlightenment should take precedence and so it had its second production block moved to January 1983, while The Return was delayed until the next season, renamed as Resurrection of the Daleks (1984).

On 17 and 18 January, scenes within the TARDIS and grid room were filmed. The TARDIS's floor was reused for the grid room's floor, with the console being removed and the cameras avoiding showing the walls. Chroma keying was used in both scenes, with the grid room's requiring the set to be consulted on by the video effects designer. Baron's appearance in the grid room was accomplished by her standing in front of a black drape. The rest of the scenes would be filmed on 30 January to 1 February, with CSO being required for Turlough floating in space and view outside of The Shadow's bridge. Due to the delays, the serial only finished filming around a month before its transmission date, meaning that composer Malcolm Clarke only received the first episode for scoring a week before broadcast, having to rely on musical cues he had recorded weeks earlier without having seen any footage. The delays also meant that several crew members were replaced between recordings, Jean Steward taking over as make-up artist from Carolyn Perry and Val McCrimmon taking over as assistant floor manager.

== Themes and interpretation ==
In their book About Time, Lawrence Miles and Tat Wood argue that the serial makes use of the science fiction trope of bored, god-like beings playing with mortals' lives for amusement. The authors liken this to a prevalent strand of children's fiction, where magical worlds are held together by the rules of the children who visit them. Miles and Wood also highlight the political elements of the story, likening the portrayal of the Eternals to the view of the upper classes as "effete parasites feeding off the labour (and in this case the imagination) of the proles." The Doctor then acts as part of the class struggle, helping the workers gain freedom while the gentry get their comeuppance. Miles and Wood also believed the serial highlighted the nature of enlightenment, showing it not to be knowledge, as the Eternals believe, but choice, as demonstrated by Turlough's rejection of the Black Guardian.

In his essay Love is a Stranger, published in the first volume of the Doctor Who Magazine — Special Edition, David Bailey highlights the central idea that "The lives of little people are precious, special and worth fighting for... The Eternals may have unimaginable power at their fingertips but they lack, and are jealous of, one thing: the ability to live, and die." According to Bailey, the hollowness of immortality was a thread that ran through Season 20, with the earlier story Mawdryn Undead (1983) showing Mawdryn trapped in an endless cycle of painful regeneration, while in "The Five Doctors" (1983), Borusa achieves "little more than a living death." Bailey explains that the horror of eternal life is brought home when the Black Guardian threatens Turlough with immortality as a punishment for failure, something that drives him to try to commit suicide rather than face eternity. John Kenneth Muir, in his book A Critical History of Doctor Who on Television, also wrote how immortality had become a recurring theme in the Fifth Doctor's era. Muir, in particular, states that serial portrays boredom as a peril of immortality, similarly to Star Trek's "Requiem for Methuselah" (1969) and Space: 1999's "End of Eternity" (1975), with the Eternals requiring games, such as the race, or human thoughts to remain entertained.

Leena Vuolteenaho, writing in the European Journal for the Critical Study of Religion, argues that the serial portrays immortals negatively, as most of the Eternals are depicted immoral, selfish, evil and uncaring towards mortal creatures. Vuolteenaho explains that the immortality of the Eternals ultimately hinders them from receiving Enlightenment; the view is similar to Christian and Buddhist beliefs, who believe that immortality is undesirable as the soul is unable to enter Heaven or saṃsāra is halted, preventing spiritual growth, respectively.

== Broadcast ==
Episode	Title	Run time	Original release date	UK viewers (millions)	Appreciation Index
1	"Part One"	24:12	1 March 1983	6.6	67
2	"Part Two"	24:23	2 March 1983	7.2	65
3	"Part Three"	24:38	8 March 1983	6.2	68
4	"Part Four"	24:34	9 March 1983	7.3	70

Enlightenment was first broadcast in a twice-weekly slot on BBC One during the first two weeks of March 1983, at 6:55pm on Mondays and 10 minutes earlier on Tuesdays. The story episodes averaged 6.8 million viewers, with the highest viewing figures being 7.3 million for the final episode. The episodes averaged 67.5% on the Appreciation Index, with Part Four once again achieving the highest figures. The BBC holds all four episodes on D-3 tape, transferred from the original 2" videotapes. The serial was sold abroad to the United States, Australia, Canada, the United Arab Emirates and New Zealand.

== Reception ==
In a contemporary Doctor Who Magazine review, Michael Daniels highly praised the serial's writing, the guest cast and special effects, and emphasised the reveal of the ships in space, the climax and Tegan's subplot with Marriner. Daniels, however felt that Leee John's performance felt "slightly wooden". Gary Gillatt, in a retrospective review for the same magazine, was similarly effusive, calling it "one of Doctor Who's finest serials." He highlighted the performance of Keith Barron as Captain Striker as being "a master class of under-stated menace" and "pitch perfect", juxtaposing this with the over-the-top pantomime villainy of Lynda Baron as Captain Wrack, with the two captains balancing each other out perfectly. David J. Howe and Stephen James Walker, by contrast, disliked the performance of Baron and John's performances, but praised the writing and climax, with both writers giving the story a rating of 7 out of 10. Three years later, the authors reiterated their view, praising the concept and imagery, underlining the first episode's cliffhanger, though felt that the serial was a "disappointing" conclusion to the Guardian Trilogy. Writing in the The Discontinuity Guide, Paul Cornell, Martin Day and Keith Topping praised the serial's writing, score and direction. They also enjoyed the performances, highlighting Strickson's, though they criticised Fielding's role, and stating that the serial was "a glittering jewel, rather neglected." Readers of Doctor Who Magazine have consistently ranked Enlightenment among the top half of the Fifth Doctor's run (Note: Out of the Fifth Doctor's 20 stories, Enlightenment was ranked 8th in 1998 and 5th in 2009, 2014 and 2023.) and of the entire programme. (Note: Enlightenment was ranked 59th of 159 in 1998, 72nd of 200 in 2009 and 75th of 241 in 2014.)

Writing for the Radio Times, Mark Braxton was less enamoured of some of the performances, suggesting that Baron and Valentine Dyall turn in 'hammy' interpretations of their characters, while John "makes heavy weather of the simplest activities" He praising the serial's basic idea, but had mixed views on the story as a whole, as he felt that the Guardian storyline was tacked on and disliked some motifs, ultimately giving the serial 2 out of 5 stars. DVD Talk's John Sinnott had similarly mixed views on the serial, although conceding that "while it doesn't all succeed, they give it a good try and more things work than don't." Sinnott also singled out the performance of Barron for particular praise, along with the relationship between Marriner and Tegan. Author Mark Campbell also highlighted Barron's performance, as well as the direction, giving the serial a 9 out of 10 rating.

In their book About Time, Lawrence Miles and Tat Wood were positive about the serial, praising the setting and the performances of Peter Davison, Barron and Brown, though felt John underperformed. They were less complimentary about the conclusion, as they claimed it felt "rushed and tacked on" with too much emphasis on the Guardians and little on the fates of the Eternals. They also dismiss the reveal of Enlightenment as being the nature of Turlough's choice, as coming "perilously close to tweeness". Literary critic John Kenneth Muir, by contrast, praised the serial's conclusion as "satisfactory", despite not enjoying the binary motifs of the Guardians. He also praised the serial's setting and imagery, positively comparing the serial to Star Blazers (1974–75) and Message from Space (1978).

== Commercial releases ==
=== In print ===
Enlightenment
- Author: Barbara Clegg
- Cover artist: Andrew Skilleter
- Series: Doctor Who book: Target novelisations
- Release number: 85
- Publisher: W. H. Allen, Target Books
- Publication date: 24 May 1984
- ISBN: 0-426-19537-X

A novelisation of this serial was written by Clegg, with a cover by Andrew Skilleter, and was numbered 85 in the ongoing range. The novelisation was pubished by W. H. Allen in hardback in February 1984 and in paperback by Target Books in May and December 1984. It was the first Doctor Who novelisation to be penned by a woman. On its publication Doctor Who Magazine was underwhelmed by the book, claiming in their review that "In many ways, it falls into the familiar Terrance Dicks pitfalls, being a straightforward reworking of the script with "said" following all the speeches. For all its faults, Enlightenment remains a good read, simply because of the strength of the story." The book was repackaged as part of The Sixth Doctor Who Gift Set later in 1984, along with three other Doctor Who novels; The Dominators, Mawdryn Undead and "The Five Doctors". An audiobook version was released in 2020, narrated by Steven Pacey.

=== Home media ===
Enlightenment was released on VHS in February 1993. It was subsequently released on DVD as part of the Black Guardian Trilogy, along with preceding stories Mawdryn Undead and Terminus on 10 August 2009. The second disc of the DVD includes a "Special Edition" version of the story; a movie-style edit featuring new CGI graphics throughout, with a newly recorded introduction by director Fiona Cumming, who also oversaw the edit. Gillatt was critical of the new special effects, stating that "this is ironic as there are few Doctor Who stories less in need of replacement effects than Enlightenment. The original model work is gorgeous, while this substitute material is crude and unsophisticated in comparison." Sinnott was more positive about the edit, believing that it removed unnecessary content from Part Three, but felt that the new CGI was only sometimes effective. Alongside the special edition, the DVD contained a number of extra features, including a Making of... documentary and extended interviews with director Fiona Cumming, writer Barbara Clegg and actor Mark Strickson, a documentary on the Guardians plus an excerpt from the Russell Harty Christmas Party TV special featuring Peter Davison. This serial was also released as part of the Doctor Who DVD Files in issue 57 in March 2011. In September 2023, the story was released again in an upgraded format for Blu-ray in the Doctor Who Collection Season 20 box set.

== Bibliography ==
- Miles, Lawrence; Wood, Tat (2004). About Time – Volume 5: 1980–1984. Mad Norwegian Press. ISBN 0-9759446-4-9.
- Bryher, David (March 2013). Spilsbury, Tom (ed.). "Enlightenment". The Fact of Fiction. Doctor Who Magazine (458). Panini Magazines. ISSN 0957-9818.
- Pixley, Andrew (13 May 1992). Russell, Gary (ed.). "Serial 6H Enlightenment". Doctor Who Archive Feature. Doctor Who Magazine. No. 186. Panini Magazines. ISSN 0957-9818.
- Ainsworth, John, ed. (2017). "Terminus, Enlightenment, The King's Demons and The Five Doctors". Doctor Who: The Complete History. Panini Comics, Hachette Partworks. ISSN 2057-6048.
- Howe, David J.; Walker, Stephen James (1995). "Enlightenment (6H)". Doctor Who: The Handbook - The Fifth Doctor. Virgin Publishing. ISBN 0 426 20458 1.
- Muir, John Kenneth (1999). A Critical History of Doctor Who on Television. McFarland. ISBN 978-1-4766-0454-1.
