= Arc of Infinity =

123 – Arc of Infinity
- Doctor Who serial

Cast
- Doctor: Peter Davison – Fifth Doctor
- Companions: Sarah Sutton – Nyssa; Janet Fielding – Tegan Jovanka
- Others: Leonard Sachs – President Borusa; Elspet Gray – Chancellor Thalia; Michael Gough – Councillor Hedin; Paul Jerricho – The Castellan; Max Harvey – Cardinal Zorac; Colin Baker – Commander Maxil; Ian Collier – Omega/The Renegade; Neil Daglish – Damon; John D. Collins – Talor; Alastair Cumming – Colin Frazer; Andrew Boxer – Robin Stuart; Maya Woolfe, Guy Groen – Hostel Receptionists; Malcolm Harvey – The Ergon

Production
- Directed by: Ron Jones
- Written by: Johnny Byrne
- Script editor: Eric Saward
- Produced by: John Nathan-Turner
- Executive producer: None
- Music by: Roger Limb
- Production code: 6E
- Series: Season 20
- Running time: 4 episodes, 25 minutes each
- First broadcast: 3 January–12 January 1983

Chronology
← Preceded by Time-Flight	Followed by → Snakedance

Arc of Infinity is the first serial of the 20th season of the British science fiction television series Doctor Who, which was first broadcast in four twice-weekly parts on BBC1 from 3 to 12 January 1983.

The serial is set in Amsterdam and on the planet Gallifrey. In the serial, the Time Lord traitor Hedin (Michael Gough) seeks to bring the founder of the Time Lords Omega (Ian Collier) out of the universe of antimatter by making him bond with the body of the Fifth Doctor (Peter Davison) in the universe of matter.

== Plot ==
On Gallifrey, the Fifth Doctor's home planet, a Time Lord traitor steals the bio-data code of another Time Lord and provides it to the Renegade, a creature composed of antimatter. The High Council of the Time Lords issue a Warrant of Termination on the Doctor to ensure the Renegade can no longer bond with him. The Doctor is taken for execution, despite Nyssa's attempts to save him, and placed in a dispersal chamber.

Unbeknownst to the High Council, The Doctor's mind has been taken into the Matrix, the repository of all Time Lord knowledge, while his body is hidden. The Renegade, who demands an opportunity to return to the Universe it once inhabited, contacts him. The truth of the aborted execution is discovered by the Castellan, who tells Nyssa, Damon, and the High Council that the Doctor is alive.

In Amsterdam, the Doctor's former companion Tegan is looking for her cousin Colin Frazer. She is greeted by his friend Robin Stuart, who explains that Colin disappeared while they were crashing in the crypt of the Frankendael mansion. The Renegade, which has established its base at the Frankendael, finds them and uses Tegan as bait to force the Doctor to obey him. The Doctor is returned to normal space on Gallifrey where he makes for the High Council Chamber.

Time Lord Councillor Hedin is revealed as the traitor who transmitted the bio-data. Hedin is in awe of his master Omega, first of the Time Lords and pioneer of time travel. Hedin wishes to release Omega from his exile in a universe of antimatter, not realising the great Time Lord has been driven insane by his years of solitary confinement. The Castellan kills Councillor Hedin, but this does not prevent Omega using the Arc of Infinity to seize total control of the Matrix and come to Earth. When he peels his decayed mask away, he reveals the features of the Doctor, whom he now perfectly resembles.

Omega leaves for Amsterdam with the Doctor and Nyssa in pursuit. Within a short time, the Doctor's prediction of an unstable transfer begins to come true: Omega's flesh decays and it is clear his new body is not permanent. When the Doctor and Nyssa catch up with him, it is a painful task for the Doctor to use the Ergon's antimatter converter on Omega, expelling him back to his own universe of antimatter. The Time Lord High Council on Gallifrey detects the end of the threat. Once Tegan has checked on her cousin's progress in hospital, she decides to rejoin the TARDIS crew.

== Production ==
The working titles for this story were The Time of Neman and The Time of Omega. For the 20th anniversary season, the production team chose to feature returning elements; Omega previously appeared in The Three Doctors (1972-1973). For Parts One and Two, the character of Omega was credited as "The Renegade" on the end credits, so as not to spoil the reveal.

Substantial portions of the story were filmed on location in Amsterdam. This was only the second time the show had filmed outside of Britain. John Nathan-Turner hoped to repeat the success of the first story filmed overseas, City of Death (1979). Amsterdam was chosen both because the BBC had recently developed contacts there and because it was cheap to arrange travel and hotel accommodations. Story writer Johnny Byrne had some trouble at first because the producers wanted a plot that made the Amsterdam setting a key factor in the course of events, rather than him just happening to be there.

=== Cast notes ===
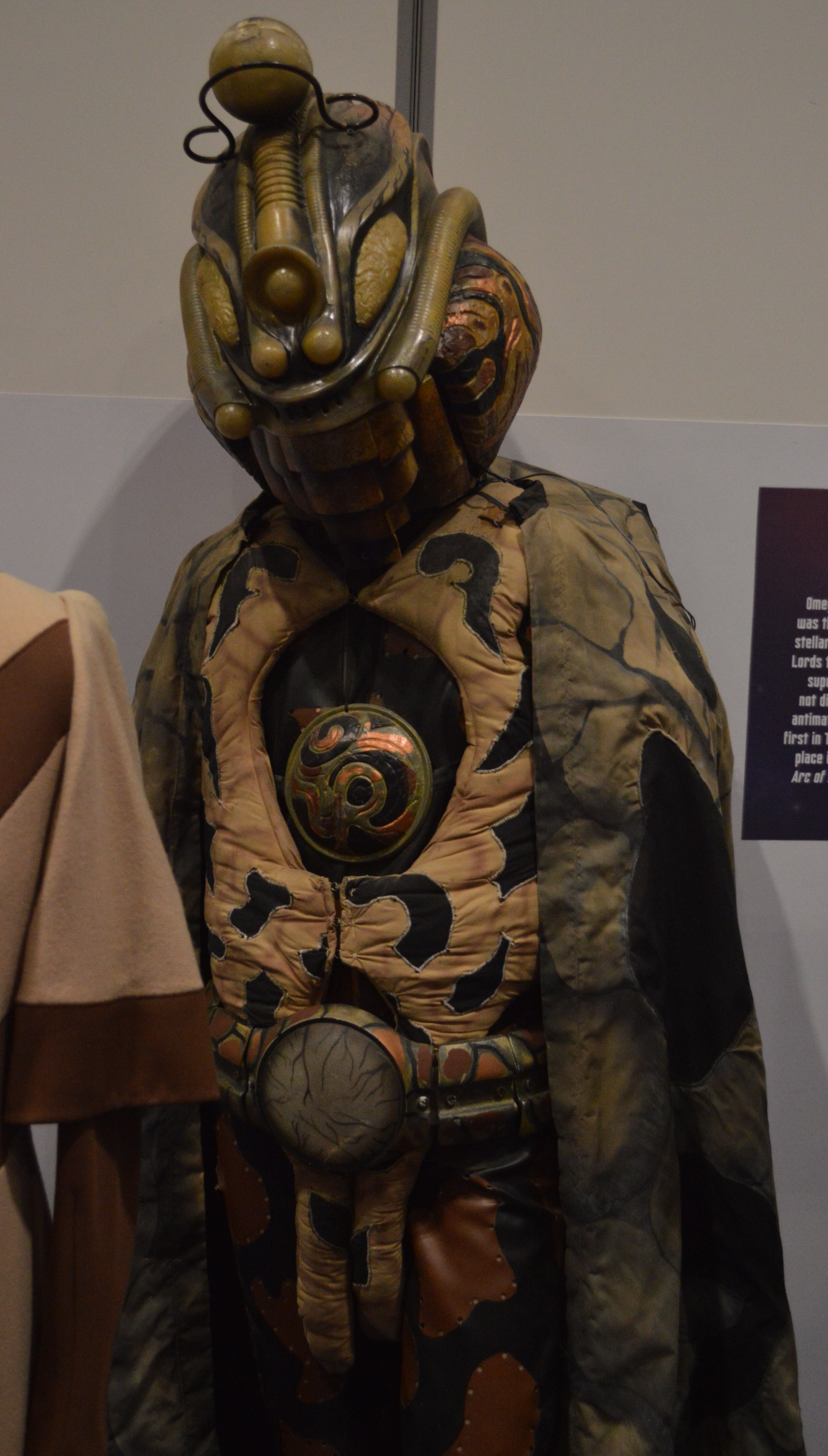
Omega's costume for this episode, on display at the Doctor Who Experience.

The story features a guest appearance by Michael Gough (who had previously played the Celestial Toymaker in the story of the same name). Leonard Sachs previously played Admiral Gaspard de Coligny in The Massacre of St Bartholomew's Eve (1966). Ian Collier previously played Stuart Hyde in The Time Monster (1972).

Colin Baker (who would later portray the Sixth Doctor) appeared in the serial as Commander Maxil. It was his performance in this role (which, according to Baker, producer John Nathan-Turner repeatedly told him to "tone down") that first brought him to the attention of the production office. Shortly after the production, the Assistant Floor Manager on the serial, Lynn Richards, invited Colin Baker to her wedding reception. Baker has said in a number of interviews that his entertaining form at the party directly led to his being cast as the Sixth Doctor the following year. Baker reprised the role of Maxil as a cameo in the 2006 Big Finish Productions audio play Gallifrey: Appropriation. Baker stated on Doctor Who: The Colin Baker Years video that John Nathan-Turner believed his performance was a little arch, and therefore gave him the nickname of Archie.

Elspet Gray, who played Thalia, later played Hera in the audio play Immortal Beloved. At the Fifth Element convention in London in February 2010, Alastair Cumming (who played Colin Frazer) explained that he is not related to Fiona Cumming (director of the Fifth Doctor serials Castrovalva (1982), Snakedance, Enlightenment (both 1983) and Planet of Fire (1984)), despite frequent reports that she was his mother.

According to the extensive production documentation released from the archive as part of the Season 20 - The Collection Box Set in September 2023, Colin Baker was originally considered for the part of the Castellan, alongside Bernard Hepton, Derek Godfrey, Patrick Stewart, Francis Matthews, Morris Perry, Keith Michell, Terrence Hardiman, Anton Rodgers, Peter Vaughan, Edward Woodward, Charles Kay, Sean Arnold and Peter Gilmore.

This is the third appearance of the Doctor's tutor Borusa, now Lord President. Actors considered for the role of Lord President Borusa were Peter Cushing who had played 'Doctor Who' in two 1960's movies featuring The Daleks; Michael Lees, Robin Bailey, Geoffrey Bayldon, Andrew Cruickshank, John Horsley, Bernard Archard, Richard Vernon, Terence Alexander and David Langton.

Alan MacNaughtan, William Fox, Donald Bisset, Glyn Owen, Richard Leech, William Lucas, Jonathan Newth, Jeffery Dench, Maurice Denham and Conrad Phillips were all considered for the role of Hedin.

Jonathan Newth was also suggested for the part of Omega, along with Malcolm Stoddard and Stephen Riddle. Honor Blackman, Jennie Linden and Lynda Bellingham were all shortlisted for the part of Thalia, with Pierce Brosnan and Tim Woodward being shortlisted for Maxil. The documentation does list whether or not some of the actors were available for the recording dates, but does not reveal if any offers were made or how final decisions on casting were reached.

Leela, the fourth Doctor's previous companion who remained on Gallifrey at the conclusion of her final televised story, is mentioned in the script, but the production documentation makes no reference to her character ever being scheduled to appear in the story.

== Broadcast and reception ==
Episode	Title	Run time	Original release date	UK viewers (millions)
1	"Part One"	24:37	3 January 1983	7.2
2	"Part Two"	24:42	5 January 1983	7.3
3	"Part Three"	24:37	11 January 1983	6.9
4	"Part Four"	24:28	12 January 1983	7.2

Part One was broadcast on a Monday due to New Year's schedules, in contrast to the rest of this season's episodes, which were all transmitted on consecutive Tuesday and Wednesday evenings. Radio Times printed complaints about the schedule. The around 7 million viewers rating was about two million lower than the previous year's series. The serial was sold abroad in New Zealand, the United States, Canada, Holland, and the United Arab Emirates.

In The Television Companion (1998), David J. Howe and Stephen James Walker described Arc of Infinity as "a prime example of a story with very high production values but, ultimately, not much else in its favour." They noted that the build-up to Omega would "fall very flat" for more casual viewers not familiar with the character, but they praised Nyssa's character. Paul Cornell, Martin Day, and Keith Topping in The Discontinuity Guide (1995) was more positive, writing, "If you can put to one side the premise, and the sub-horror film scenario of two young men staying overnight in a crypt, then there's more than a little fun to be had here." They praised Davison's performance as Omega in Episode Four, though felt Gallifrey was "drab." In 2012, Patrick Mulkern of Radio Times gave the serial one out of five stars, describing it as "Eyes-rolling-back-in-your-skull, tongue-lolling-out-of-your-mouth dull. And over-complicated." He criticised the coincidental reintroduction of Tegan and the direction, but praised the Time Lord actors. IGN's Arnold T. Blumberg was more positive, writing, that it "never quite succeeds at being the splashy anniversary opener that it wants to be, although it's pretty good over all." For DVD Talk, Stuart Galbraith IV rated the content of the story two and a half out of five stars, describing it as "an entertaining but deeply flawed story." He noted that handling the Amsterdam locale, Tegan's return, and Omega's return made the story "disjointed" with a lot of running around. Reviewing the season as a whole, Starburst's Paul Mount described Arc of Infinity as "a dreary four-parter that involves too much creaky melodrama on the Doctor’s home planet Gallifrey (and some runaround location footage shot in Amsterdam for no other reason than just because) and a ludicrous chicken-headed alien called the Ergon."

== Commercial releases ==
=== In print ===
Arc of Infinity
- Author: Terrance Dicks
- Series: Doctor Who book: Target novelisations
- Release number: 80
- Publisher: Target Books
- Publication date: 20 October 1983
- ISBN: 0-426-19342-3

A novelisation of this serial, written by Terrance Dicks, was published by Target Books in July 1983. It included some of the deleted scenes.

=== Home media ===
Arc of Infinity was released on VHS in March 1994. A double-pack DVD featuring both Time-Flight and Arc of Infinity was released on 6 August 2007. This serial was also released as part of the Doctor Who DVD Files in Issue 108 on 20 February 2013. In September 2023, the story was released again in an upgraded format for Blu-ray, being included with the other stories from Season 20 in the Doctor Who - The Collection Box Set.

== Bibliography ==
- Wright, Mark, ed. (2017). "Arc of Infinity, Snakedance, and Mawdryn Undead". Doctor Who: The Complete History. Vol. 36, no. 39. London: Panini Comics, Hachette Partworks.
