= Terminus (Doctor Who) =

126 (Note: From the Doctor Who Magazine series overview, in issue 407 (pp26-29). The Discontinuity Guide, which counts the unbroadcast serial Shada, lists this as story number 127. Region 1 DVD releases follow The Discontinuity Guide numbering system.) – Terminus
- Doctor Who serial

Cast
- Doctor: Peter Davison – Fifth Doctor
- Companions: Sarah Sutton – Nyssa; Janet Fielding – Tegan Jovanka; Mark Strickson – Vislor Turlough
- Others: Valentine Dyall – Black Guardian; Liza Goddard – Kari; Dominic Guard – Olvir; Andrew Burt – Valgard; Tim Munro – Sigurd; Martin Potter – Eirak; Peter Benson – Bor; R.J. Bell – The Garm; Martin Muncaster – Tannoy Voice; Rachel Weaver – Inga

Production
- Directed by: Mary Ridge
- Written by: Stephen Gallagher
- Script editor: Eric Saward
- Produced by: John Nathan-Turner
- Music by: Roger Limb
- Production code: 6G
- Series: Season 20
- Running time: 4 episodes, 25 minutes each
- First broadcast: 15–23 February 1983 (Note: "Part One" was first broadcast 14 February 1983 in Wales)

Chronology
← Preceded by Mawdryn Undead	Followed by → Enlightenment

Terminus is the fourth serial of the 20th season of the British science fiction television series Doctor Who, which was originally broadcast in four twice-weekly parts on BBC1 from 15 to 23 February 1983.

In the serial, the alien time traveller the Fifth Doctor (Peter Davison) attempts to stop the fuel from a plague spaceship called Terminus from exploding and causing the destruction of the universe.

Terminus is the second of three loosely connected serials where the Black Guardian (Valentine Dyall) attempts to compel the alien Vislor Turlough (Mark Strickson) to kill the Doctor. It marks the final regular appearance of Sarah Sutton as companion Nyssa.

== Plot ==
Under the Black Guardian's instructions, Turlough sabotages the TARDIS, causing parts of it to dissolve. The TARDIS, to save itself, merges with a spaceship heading for an unknown destination. The Doctor and Nyssa, while exploring the ship, encounter two raiders, Kari and Olvir, who intend to plunder the cargo.

When the raiders' ship abandons Kari and Olvir, it becomes apparent that the spaceship is actually a transport carrying Lazars, sufferers of a leprosy-like disease, to a space station named Terminus. The station is owned by a corporation that claims a cure exists, but no-one has returned. Nyssa, separated from the Doctor, is infected by the disease and ushered away with the rest of the Lazars by the Vanir, the caretakers of the station who depend upon hydromel, a chemical given them by the corporation, to live. She is given over to the Garm, a giant dog-like biped, who takes her to a chamber and exposes her to radiation.

The Doctor and Kari find the control room and the Doctor realises that Terminus is a time ship. In some unspecified past, the fuel that powered it became unstable and the now dead pilot had tried to jettison it while still in the time vortex. The tank exploded, and the rush of energy started the Big Bang and hurled Terminus billions of years into the future. There is still one tank of unstable fuel left, and the computer has begun a countdown to jettison that too.

Nyssa awakes to find out that she is no longer infected. The radiation cure works, but as many people die from it as recover. The Garm knows this, but is unable to refine it as he is controlled by the Vanir. Enlisting the Garm's help, the Doctor staves off the countdown long enough to disable the computer and cut the engine control wires, then sets the Garm free.

Nyssa strikes a bargain with the Vanir – in exchange for synthesising hydromel and freeing them from the corporation's influence, they will turn Terminus from a leper colony into a true hospital, and with the Garm's help refine the radiation cure. Deciding that she is needed more on Terminus, Nyssa elects to stay behind, bidding her friends a tearful farewell. As Tegan and the Doctor return to the TARDIS, the Black Guardian tells Turlough that this is his last chance to kill the Doctor.

== Production ==
The production of Terminus was fraught with technical difficulties, including problems with costumes, delays due to electrical problems, and a mis-built set. The result was that some scenes had to be recorded on improperly-lit sets, production ran seriously late, and several scenes were taped hastily, much to Davison's frustration. Stephen Gallagher originally wanted to call Kari "Yoni" until Eric Saward pointed out that it was the Sanskrit word for the female reproductive organ.

In this serial Nyssa drops her skirt in part two and remains in a slip for the remainder of the story. According to the script she was feeling ill and trying to loosen the pressure on her stomach, but this is not clear on screen. In a 1988 interview for the book Doctor Who: 25 Glorious Years, Sarah Sutton, who played Nyssa, suggests it was deliberate fan service:

'I still smile when I remember how the Production Office kept getting letters of complaint about Nyssa being too covered up. So that's why when I left the series in "Terminus" I decided to drop my skirt as a parting gesture to all those fans who had written in.

'Mind you, it caused such a stir at the time, and as I'm still being asked about it when I am interviewed, I'm not sure it was a wise thing to have done!'

In an interview for season 20's 2023 Blu-ray release, interviewer Matthew Sweet informed Sutton of the claim that she devised the moment, attributing it to Wikipedia, which she denied. She also expressed regret that she had not spoken up against it at the time.

=== Cast notes ===
Liza Goddard, who plays Kari, is the former wife of Sixth Doctor actor Colin Baker.

According to the extensive production documentation released from the archive as part of the Season 20 - The Collection Box Set in September 2023, director Mary Ridge offered the part of Kari to Twiggy and the part of Eirik to Robin Ellis, writing to both their agents inviting them to play the roles. The documentation does not include a response or reasons why they turned down the roles.

== Outside references ==
The Vanir here are references to the Vanir of Norse mythology. Garm was the guard dog of Hel, the land of the dead.

== Broadcast and reception ==
Episode	Title	Run time	Original release date	UK viewers (millions)
1	"Part One"	24:58	15 February 1983	6.8
2	"Part Two"	24:40	16 February 1983	7.5
3	"Part Three"	24:39	22 February 1983	6.5
4	"Part Four"	24:49	23 February 1983	7.4

Following broadcast of the first two episodes, a member from The Leprosy Mission wrote into Radio Times to criticise the treatment of leprosy, describing the Doctor as "perpetuating the ignorance and fear which still make life difficult for the world's 15 million leprosy sufferers." John Nathan-Turner apologised and remarked how the disease is found to have a cure by the end of the story.

In The Television Companion (1998), David J. Howe and Stephen James Walker wrote that "in theory, [the story] has a lot going for it" but was let down by " its shortage of incident, coupled with its unremittingly grim atmosphere" and that it "does unfortunately rather deserve its poor reputation." Paul Cornell, Martin Day, and Keith Topping in The Discontinuity Guide (1995) wrote, "Terminus has matured and now stands revealed as an excellent example of pure, technobabble-free SF within the series' format. Nyssa's farewell with the Doctor...is one of the series' most emotional moments." In 2012, Patrick Mulkern of Radio Times gave the story two out of five stars, calling the first episode "one of the most effective of the season" and finding Nyssa's exit "fleetingly moving," but he criticised the sidelining of Turlough and Tegan in the story. In 2010, DVD Talk's John Sinnott described it as the "stinker" of the Black Guardian Trilogy due to dividing up the characters and many unanswered questions He wrote, "There was a very interesting tale hidden underneath the extraneous subplot and seemingly meaningless digressions. With one more through rewrite it could have been an excellent adventure." Reviewing the season as a whole, Starburst's Paul Mount wrote, that Terminus "offers a new spin on the creation of the Universe but its script is far too ambitious for the BBC’s mid-’80s resources"

== Commercial releases ==
=== In print ===
Terminus
- Author: Stephen Gallagher
- Series: Doctor Who book: Target novelisations
- Release number: 79
- Publisher: Target Books
- Publication date: 15 September 1983
- ISBN: 0-426-19385-7

A novelisation of this serial, written by Stephen Gallagher under the pseudonym "John Lydecker", was published by Target Books in June 1983. As with Warriors' Gate the novelisation has no chapters.

=== Home media ===
Terminus was released on VHS in February 1993. It was released as part of the Black Guardian Trilogy DVD on 10 August 2009. This serial was scheduled to be released as part of the Doctor Who DVD Files in Issue 140 on 14 May 2014. In September 2023, the story was released again in an upgraded format for Blu-ray, being included with the other stories from Season 20 in the Doctor Who - The Collection Box Set.
