= The King's Demons =

128 – The King's Demons
- Doctor Who serial

Cast
- Doctor: Peter Davison – Fifth Doctor
- Companions: Janet Fielding – Tegan Jovanka; Mark Strickson – Vislor Turlough; Gerald Flood (Voice of Kamelion)
- Others: Anthony Ainley – The Master / Sir Gilles Estram; Gerald Flood – King John; Frank Windsor – Ranulf; Isla Blair – Isabella; Christopher Villiers – Hugh; Michael J. Jackson – Sir Geoffrey de Lacey; Peter Burroughs – Jester; Jakob Lindberg – Lutenist

Production
- Directed by: Tony Virgo
- Written by: Terence Dudley
- Script editor: Eric Saward
- Produced by: John Nathan-Turner
- Executive producer: None
- Music by: Jonathan Gibbs
- Production code: 6J
- Series: Season 20
- Running time: 2 episodes, 25 minutes each
- First broadcast: 15–16 March 1983

Chronology
← Preceded by Enlightenment	Followed by → "The Five Doctors"

The King's Demons is the sixth and final serial of the 20th season of the British science fiction television series Doctor Who, which was originally broadcast on BBC1 on 15 and 16 March 1983. This serial introduced Kamelion, voiced by Gerald Flood, as a companion.

The serial is set in an English castle in 1215. In the serial, the alien time traveller known as the Master (Anthony Ainley) uses the robot Kamelion to imitate King John of England as part of the Master's plot to have the real King John overthrown and thus prevent the signing of the Magna Carta.

== Plot ==
In 1215, the Court of King John of England is at the castle of Sir Ranulf Fitzwilliam to extort more taxes, and when the lord refuses to pay the King insults him. To defend his honour his son Hugh takes on the King's champion, Sir Gilles Estram, in a joust. The latter wins easily, though the joust is disturbed by the arrival of the TARDIS. The Fifth Doctor, Tegan, and Turlough are greeted as demons and welcomed by the King.

Having established the date, the Doctor concludes the King is not himself – in fact, he is not the King at all, as he is actually in London taking the Crusader’s Oath. Sir Geoffrey de Lacy, the cousin of Sir Ranulf, arrives at the castle and confirms he knows the King is in London. Sir Gilles is about to torture him as a liar during a royal banquet when the Doctor intervenes. It seems the King's champion is not who he claims to be, either: Sir Gilles sheds his disguise and reveals himself to be the Doctor's nemesis, the Master. He flees in his own TARDIS, which had been disguised as an iron maiden.

The King knights the Doctor as his new champion, and he is given run of the castle. After a series of mishaps, including the death of Sir Geoffrey at the Master's hands, the Doctor confronts the King and the Master and discovers the truth. The monarch is really Kamelion, a war weapon found by the Master on Xeriphas, which can be mentally controlled and used to adopt disguises and personas. Disguised as King John, the Master intends that Kamelion will behave so appallingly so as to provoke a rebellion and topple the real King from his throne, thus robbing the world of Magna Carta, the foundation of parliamentary democracy. It is a small plan on the Master's usual scale, but nevertheless particularly poisonous to the normal progress of Earth society.

The Doctor resolves the situation by testing the Master in a battle of wills for control over Kamelion. He takes control of the robot and steals it away in the TARDIS, thus foiling the Master's scheme. Kamelion reverts to its robot form and thanks the Doctor for his assistance and rescue. Kamelion asks to stay aboard the TARDIS, though Tegan seems unsure. When the Doctor suggests returning Tegan to Earth, Tegan however says she still wants to stay. The crew then head off for the Eye of Orion.

== Production ==
Episode	Title	Run time	Original release date	UK viewers (millions)
1	"Part One"	24:48	15 March 1983	5.8
2	"Part Two"	24:27	16 March 1983	7.2

The story was repeated on BBC1 on consecutive Fridays 6–13 July 1984, achieving viewing figures of 3.3 and 5.0 million respectively. The working titles for this story were The Android, The Demons, A Knight's Tale and Demons Keeper. Part One of this story was billed by the BBC as the six hundredth episode of Doctor Who.

This story marked the first appearance of Kamelion as voiced by Gerald Flood. Freelance effects designer Richard Gregory and software designer Mike Power gave a demonstration of the robot prototype for Nathan-Turner and Saward. Nathan-Turner was so impressed he commissioned scriptwriter Terence Dudley to develop a storyline to introduce Kamelion into the series. Shortly after filming, however, Power died in a boating accident and no one was able to continue his work. Subsequently, Kamelion made only two appearances before being written out of the series.

In the story, the Master disguises himself as Sir Gilles Estram, Estram being an anagram of "Master". To hide Ainley's return, Sir Gilles was credited in the Radio Times as having been played by "James Stoker", an anagram of "Master's Joke".

This story marks the last appearance of the TARDIS console room set, which had been in use since The Invisible Enemy. A new console room would debut in the next story, "The Five Doctors", although the console itself would be reused as the Second Doctor's console in The Two Doctors.

According to the extensive production documentation released from the archive as part of the Season 20 - The Collection Box Set in September 2023, Eleanor Bron was offered the part of Queen Isabella. Bron was later cast as Kara in the Season 22 story Revelation of the Daleks.

== Commercial releases ==
=== In print ===
The King's Demons
- Author: Terence Dudley
- Cover artist: David McAllister
- Series: Doctor Who book: Target novelisations
- Release number: 108
- Publisher: Target Books
- Publication date: February 1986 (Hardback) 10 July 1986 (Paperback)
- ISBN: 0-491-03642-6

A novelisation of this serial, written by Terence Dudley, was published by Target Books in February 1986.

=== Home media ===
The King's Demons was released on VHS in November 1995 in a box set along with a special edition of the subsequent serial "The Five Doctors" and a postcard book. It and Planet of Fire were released in a Kamelion-themed DVD box set on 14 June 2010. In September 2023, the story was released again in an upgraded format for Blu-ray, being included with the other stories from Season 20 in the Doctor Who - The Collection Box Set.
