= Ian Collier =

British actor (1943–2008)

- Born: Ian Gordon Arthur Collier; 25 January 1943
- Died: 1 October 2008 (aged 65); London, England
- Occupation: Actor

Ian Gordon Arthur Collier (25 January 1943 – 1 October 2008) was a British actor.

Collier appeared on stage in Tony Richardson's production of Hamlet in 1969 at London's Roundhouse, and at the Lunt-Fontanne theater in New York City. Other repertory work includes appearances in Barrow-in-Furness and Liverpool, as well as the Royal Shakespeare Company. He also appeared in various television programmes including Rentaghost, Hi-de-Hi! and Howards' Way as well as in the Doctor Who serial The Time Monster.

Collier portrayed the villain Omega in the Fifth Doctor serial Arc of Infinity and later in the Big Finish Productions audio drama Omega. He played Bernice Summerfield's father, Isaac Summerfield, in Death and the Daleks, and he guest starred in the Big Finish Productions Doctor Who audio drama Excelis Decays. Among his other television appearances was a guest part in an episode of Are You Being Served? in 1985.

Collier's film credits included roles in Hamlet (1969), The Next Man (1976), A Nightingale Sang in Berkeley Square (1979) and Heritage Africa (1989).

Collier died on 1 October 2008 of unspecified causes.
