= Mawdryn Undead =

125 – Mawdryn Undead
- Doctor Who serial

Cast
- Doctor: Peter Davison – Fifth Doctor
- Companions: Sarah Sutton – Nyssa; Janet Fielding – Tegan Jovanka; Mark Strickson – Vislor Turlough
- Others: Nicholas Courtney – Brigadier Lethbridge-Stewart; David Collings – Mawdryn; Valentine Dyall – Black Guardian; Angus MacKay – Headmaster; Stephen Garlick – Ibbotson; Roger Hammond – Dr Runciman; Sheila Gill – Matron; Peter Walmsley, Brian Darnley – Mutants

Production
- Directed by: Peter Moffatt
- Written by: Peter Grimwade
- Script editor: Eric Saward
- Produced by: John Nathan-Turner
- Executive producer: None
- Music by: Paddy Kingsland
- Production code: 6F
- Series: Season 20
- Running time: 4 episodes, 25 minutes each
- First broadcast: 1–9 February 1983

Chronology
← Preceded by Snakedance	Followed by → Terminus

Mawdryn Undead is the third serial of the 20th season of the British science fiction television series Doctor Who. It was originally broadcast in four twice weekly parts on BBC1 from 1 to 9 February 1983.

The serial is set in an English boarding school and a spaceship above the Earth in 1977 and 1983. In the serial, the scientist Mawdryn (David Collings), whose people on board the ship have been afflicted by a mutation that constantly causes their bodies to renew themselves, seeks to use the regenerative abilities of the alien time traveller the Fifth Doctor (Peter Davison) to stop this process and allow them to die.

Mawdryn Undead is the first of three loosely connected serials in which the Black Guardian (Valentine Dyall) attempts to compel the alien Vislor Turlough (Mark Strickson) to kill the Doctor, and it introduces Turlough as a regular character. Nicholas Courtney is reintroduced as Brigadier Lethbridge-Stewart, who was last seen in the series in the 1975 serial Terror of the Zygons.

== Plot ==
In 1983, Vislor Turlough, a stranded alien posing as a human student, is given an offer by the Black Guardian for passage off Earth if he should kill the Fifth Doctor.

Meanwhile, the Doctor, Tegan and Nyssa find the TARDIS stuck in the warp ellipse of a starliner trapped in time. Materialising aboard, they find a transmat device with separate endpoints to Earth in 1977 and 1983 is creating the interference. Turlough arrives from the 1983 transmat, feigning lack of comprehension of the situation. The Doctor instructs Nyssa and Tegan to stay aboard the TARDIS while he returns with Turlough to 1983 to fix that transmat point, hoping it will allow the TARDIS to escape. Instead, the TARDIS materialises in 1977 at Turlough's school. Coincidentally the Doctor's old friend from UNIT, retired Brigadier Lethbridge-Stewart, is now a maths teacher at the school and is surprised to learn some trauma in the past has made him lose the memories of the last few years; as a result, he does not remember the Doctor at all. However, as the Doctor talks about Tegan, about himself and his former companions, the Brigadier starts regaining some memories.

In 1977, Nyssa and Tegan leave the TARDIS and find a horribly disfigured man in the transmat capsule, who claims to be the Doctor in the midst of a regeneration. They seek out help from the younger Brigadier, and the "Doctor" urges all three to return with him to the starliner via the TARDIS. In 1983, the Doctor detects the TARDIS' movement, and he, Turlough, and the older Brigadier also return to the starliner via the transmat. The Doctor regroups with his companions; realising two versions of the Brigadier are aboard, he instructs them all to keep the two separated, as, should they touch, it could release a potentially catastrophic energy discharge due to the Blinovitch limitation effect.

The figure posing as the Doctor is forced to reveal himself as Mawdryn, one of several scientists aboard the liner who were trying to discover the Time Lord secret of regeneration. Their experiments failed, and he and his fellow scientists have become immortal in this painful state and seek to die, but the Doctor determines the only way to do so is to give up his remaining regenerations. He attempts to leave with his companions, but finds that Nyssa and Tegan suffer the same affliction as Mawdryn, ageing and de-ageing rapidly once in the Time Vortex, and quickly returns to the ship. The Doctor agrees to give up his regenerations and prepares to transfer this energy, with the Brigadier at the machine controls. Meanwhile, the Brigadier from 1977, having been left alone, bursts in upon them. The two Brigadiers reach out to touch, and the flash of energy occurs just at the right moment before the Doctor gives up his regenerations, ending Mawdryn's and his colleagues' lives as requested, restoring Nyssa and Tegan, and saving the Doctor. The younger Brigadier passes out from shock, and the Doctor suspects this was the trauma that caused him to lose his memory. The TARDIS crew return the Brigadiers to their proper times, and the Doctor accepts Turlough's request to join his crew, unaware of the Black Guardian's influence.

== Production ==
Mawdryn Undead was a replacement for an earlier script, The Song of the Space Whale, by Pat Mills. That script fell through when Mills and script editor Eric Saward could not agree on certain elements of the story. Instead, Peter Grimwade quickly produced Mawdryn Undead to fill the gap in the production schedule. The Song of the Space Whale was later renamed The Song of Megaptera and made into an audio drama by Big Finish Productions for their Doctor Who The Lost Stories range.

=== Cast notes ===
The original intent of the production team was for the character of Ian Chesterton, one of the original regulars from the series' first two seasons from 1963 to 1965, to return for a guest appearance in this story; hence the school setting, as Chesterton was a science teacher, and the Brigadier's being issued with another TARDIS homing device. However, actor William Russell proved to be unavailable. Some consideration was given to using instead the character of Harry Sullivan, who was a regular in the programme for a season in the mid-1970s, before the return of Lethbridge-Stewart was eventually decided upon.

David Collings, who played Mawdryn, also appeared in the Fourth Doctor serials Revenge of the Cybermen (1975) as Vorus and The Robots of Death (1977) as Poul, and would himself play an alternative Doctor in Big Finish Productions' Doctor Who Unbound audio play, Full Fathom Five. Angus MacKay previously played Borusa in The Deadly Assassin (1976). John Nathan-Turner felt that Mark Strickson's blond hair didn't stand out well enough from Peter Davison's blond hair. He initially asked Strickson to shave his head, but when Strickson declined, Turner decided that Strickson's hair should be dyed red.

== Broadcast and reception ==
Episode	Title	Run time	Original release date	UK viewers (millions)
1	"Part One"	24:03	1 February 1983	6.5
2	"Part Two"	24:33	2 February 1983	7.5
3	"Part Three"	24:32	8 February 1983	7.4
4	"Part Four"	24:33	9 February 1983	7.7

In The Television Companion (1998), David J. Howe and Stephen James Walker described Mawdryn Undead as "arguably one of the most ambitious stories that Doctor Who ever attempted," though it introduced the UNIT dating continuity error. They concluded, "Despite the overloading of the scripts, the story does ultimately work and is never less than enjoyable. A tribute, perhaps, to Peter Grimwade's skills as a writer." Paul Cornell, Martin Day, and Keith Topping in The Discontinuity Guide (1995) wrote, "It's nice to have an adventure where someone doesn't want to destroy the Universe or take over the Earth, although this does mean that the final episode is a bit dull." In 2012, Patrick Mulkern of Radio Times gave the story four out of five stars, describing Nicholas Courtney as "pure gold." He was mixed on the makeup effects and called Strickson "refreshing" as Turlough. John Sinnott of DVD Talk called it "a good story" and good start to the Black Guardian trilogy. Reviewing the season as a whole, Starburst's Paul Mount described Mawdryn Undead as "a busy serial" that "offers an interesting take on the curse of immortality."

== Commercial releases ==
=== In print ===
Mawdryn Undead
- Author: Peter Grimwade
- Series: Doctor Who book: Target novelisations
- Release number: 82
- Publisher: Target Books
- Publication date: 12 January 1984
- ISBN: 0-426-19393-8

A novelisation of this serial, written by Peter Grimwade, was published by Target Books in August 1983.

=== Home media ===
Mawdryn Undead was released on VHS in November 1992. It was released on DVD as part of the Black Guardian Trilogy on 10 August 2009 (Region 2), with a commentary by Peter Davison, Mark Strickson, Nicholas Courtney and Eric Saward and an option to view the story with new CGI effects. The serial was also released in issue 50 of the Doctor Who DVD Files, published 1 December 2010. In September 2023, the story was released again in an upgraded format for Blu-ray, being included with the other stories from Season 20 in the Doctor Who - The Collection Box Set.
