= Gerald Flood =

British actor (1927–1989)

- Born: 21 April 1927; Portsmouth, Hampshire, England
- Died: 12 April 1989 (aged 61); Farnham, Surrey, England
- Occupation: Actor
- Years active: 1948–1989
- Notable work: Playing King John and voicing Kamelion in Doctor Who
- Relatives: Toby Flood (grandson)

Gerald Robert Flood (21 April 1927 – 12 April 1989) was a British actor of stage and television. He is perhaps best remembered for voicing Kamelion in Doctor Who.

== Early life ==
Flood was born in Portsmouth, Hampshire, but lived for most of his life in Farnham, Surrey, where he regularly appeared on stage at the Castle Theatre. He served as a wireless operator in the RAF during World War II, and worked as a filing clerk before becoming an actor. He joined the Farnham Repertory Company after the war.

== Career ==
Gerald Flood's first television starring roles were in the popular ABC science-fiction television serials Pathfinders in Space, Pathfinders to Mars and Pathfinders to Venus, 1960–1961, as journalist Conway Henderson; these were follow-up sequels to Target Luna. This was followed in 1962–1963 by the series City Beneath the Sea and its sequel, Secret Beneath the Sea, when he played the role of Mark Bannerman.

He came to national prominence whilst starring alongside Patrick Allen and Sam Kydd in the Morocco-based police series, Crane, which ran from 1963 to 1965 on ITV. In this he played the character of police chief Colonel Sharif Mahmoud.

=== Theatre ===
In 1957, he performed in the pantomime Mother Goose at the Connaught Theatre in Worthing, Sussex, England with Douglas Byng, Eve Lister, Ann Lancaster, Rosalie Ashley, Reg Thompson, The Hedley Ward Trio, and Roland Curram in the cast. Guy Vaesen and Thurza Rogers were directors.

From 1959 to 1960, he acted in Graham Greene's play, The Complaisant Lover at the Globe Theatre in London, England with Ralph Richardson, Paul Scofield, Phyllis Calvert, Lockwood West, Helen Lowry, Polly Adams, Hugh Janes and Oliver Burt in the cast. John Gielgud was director.

In June 1967, Flood took over from Donald Sinden the role of Robert Danvers in the hit comedy There's a Girl in My Soup, at The Globe (now Gielgud) Theatre in London's West End, which he played until December 1968. He reprised the role during a UK tour of the play in 1972/73, including Wolverhampton, Leeds and Glasgow amongst other venues, and again at the Bristol Hippodrome in June 1976. In total he played the role of Robert Danvers more than 650 times.

In 1971, he played the role of Tom Hillyer in the Lesley Storm comedy Look, No Hands! at the Fortune Theatre in London's West End.

In 1974, he acted in JB Priestley's play, Dangerous Corner, at the Yvonne Arnaud Theatre in Guildford, Surrey, England with Rachel Gurney, Barbara Jefford, and Christopher Good in the cast.

In 1977, he acted in She Stoops to Conquer at the 7 Arts Theatre, Salisbury (now Harare), Rhodesia. Co-Producer and actor David Nicholas Wilkinson set this in a pioneer Rhodesia setting, and it was first time black actors performed in the theatre in that country. Most of their scenes were with Flood who encouraged them to improvise. During the run, as a thank you Flood took these actors to a night club to see singer Kiki Dee perform. Although there was no apartheid in Rhodesia the management asked the black actors to leave. Flood would not tolerate this and persuaded the entire audience to leave until the actors were allowed back in. The management changed their mind.

In 1981, he acted in David Storey's play, Early Days, in a British National Theatre production at the Comedy Theatre in London, England with Ralph Richardson, Sheila Ballantine, and Marty Cruickshank in the cast. Lindsay Anderson was director.

In 1982, he acted in the play Public Relations, co-starring Richard Coleman.

In 1983, he acted in the play Underground at the Theatre Royal, York.

In 1985, he acted in the play The Cabinet Mole at the Richmond Theatre in Richmond, London with Amanda Barrie, Bruce Montague and Derek Bond in the cast.

=== Doctor Who ===
Flood appeared in the BBC science fiction series Doctor Who as the voice of the robot companion Kamelion in two serials — The King's Demons and Planet of Fire as well as a brief scene in the regeneration serial The Caves of Androzani. (In The King's Demons, Flood also appeared onscreen as King John.) Originally, the character was to have been featured more heavily in other serials but his scenes were either edited out for timing reasons or dropped due to the difficulty in operating the Kamelion prop.

=== Other work ===
Flood also appeared in a number of other television roles over the years. These included the ITC series The Champions, Strange Report and Randall and Hopkirk (Deceased). Flood starred as spy Peregrine Smith in The Rat Catchers (1967). He portrayed Sir Richard Flashman in the BBC's popular 1971 television serial Tom Brown's Schooldays and was also in Bachelor Father. Flood also appeared in Steptoe and Son, Raffles, Crown Court (TV series) ('Murder Most Foul' episode), Two in Clover, 'The Madras House and Comedy Playhouse.

== Family ==
Toby Flood, the English international rugby union player, is Flood's paternal grandson.

== Train crash ==
Gerald Flood was on the sleeper train which came off the rails at Morpeth, Northumberland on 24 June 1984. He was interviewed by BBC News afterwards.

== Filmography ==
His film credits included Smokescreen (1964), Patton (1970), and Frightmare (1974).

Year	Title	Role	Notes
1959	Captured		
1961	Plateau of Fear	Mark Bannerman	TV series
1964	Smokescreen	Graham Turner	
1970	Patton	Air Chief Marshal Sir Arthur Tedder	
1970	Steptoe and Son	Estate Agent	Episode: "Without Prejudice"
1971	Tom Brown's Schooldays	Sir Richard Flashman	TV serial
1974	Frightmare	Matthew Laurence	
1981	A Sharp Intake of Breath	Doctor	Episode: "Rear Window", . Broadcast 15/2/'81.

== Sources ==
- V&A Theatre & Performance Enquiry Service Archives
- Cameron Mackintosh Ltd. & Delfont Mackintosh Theatres Ltd. Archives
- theatre programmes
