= Valentine Dyall =

English actor (1908–1985)

- Dyall as the Black Guardian in Doctor Who
- Born: 7 May 1908; London, England
- Died: 24 June 1985 (aged 77); Haywards Heath, West Sussex, England
- Years active: 1942–1985
- Notable work: Radio's "The Man in Black"; The Haunting (1963); Casino Royale (1967); The Hitchhiker's Guide to the Galaxy radio series; Doctor Who
- Spouses: Marjorie Stonor (m. 1935; div. 1940) Babette Jones (m. 1941) Kathleen E. Woodman (m. 1970)
- Children: 3

Valentine Dyall (7 May 1908 – 24 June 1985) was an English character actor. Noted for his harsh and deep voice, he worked regularly as a voice actor, and was known for many years as "The Man in Black", the narrator of the BBC Radio horror series Appointment with Fear; reprising the role in the 1950 Hammer film The Man in Black.

He is further remembered by science fiction fans for playing Gargravarr in The Hitchhiker's Guide to the Galaxy, and playing the Black Guardian in Doctor Who. He was also a regular in the BBC's WWII drama Secret Army.

He was the son of the actor Franklin Dyall and the actress and author Mary Phyllis Joan Logan, who acted and wrote as Concordia Merrel.

== 1930s to 1950s ==
In 1934, Dyall appeared with his father, actor Franklin Dyall, at the Manchester Hippodrome in Sir Oswald Stoll's presentation of Shakespeare's Henry V, playing the roles of the Archbishop of Canterbury, Captain Gower, and a cardinal of France. He also appeared in one movie with his father, the 1943 spy thriller Yellow Canary; Dyall's part was that of a German U-boat commander attempting to kidnap a British agent from a ship in the Atlantic, while his father played the ship's captain.

In the same year he had a small role as a German officer in The Life and Death of Colonel Blimp and, the following year, played the Duke of Burgundy in Laurence Olivier's film version of Henry V.

In 1946, he appeared, uncredited, as the character Stephen Lynn in the romantic film drama Brief Encounter; Lynn is protagonist Alec Harvey's friend whose unexpected arrival spoils Alec's opportunity of consummating his romance.

Dyall's film career peaked in the late 1940s; in 1949 he appeared in 12 films in that single year. However, those film roles varied greatly in size: two of them were leading roles (in Doctor Morelle and Vengeance Is Mine) whilst several others were just bit parts.

During the 1950s, Dyall made several guest appearances in episodes of the BBC Home Service radio comedy series The Goon Show, parodying his familiar radio persona.

In 1960, he played the witch Jethrow Keane in The City of the Dead (known as Horror Hotel in the United States).

== 1960s ==
Dyall appeared in Robert Wise's 1963 film The Haunting as Mr. Dudley, the sinister caretaker of the haunted Hill House. Also that year, he played the central character Lord Fortnum in Spike Milligan and John Antrobus's stage play The Bedsitting Room, set in the aftermath of nuclear war. The play opened at the Mermaid Theatre on 31 January. Dyall narrated the mondo documentary The Mystery and the Pleasure in 1966, and part-narrated the pseudo-documentary The Naked World of Harrison Marks in 1967. In the same year he voiced the character of evil mastermind Dr. Noah in the James Bond parody film Casino Royale; as well as the unseen God in Faust Legend-inspired comedy Bedazzled, for which he was uncredited. He later provided the voice of the mummy narrator in Secrets of Sex (1969).

With Dusty Springfield, Dyall co-hosted the BBC music variety series Decidedly Dusty in 1969; no complete episode has survived.

== 1970s and 1980s ==
In 1975, at London's Royal Court Theatre, Dyall played Dr. Rance in a major revival of Joe Orton's play What the Butler Saw. Between 1977 and 1979, he appeared as Dr. Pascal Keldermans in the BBC television series Secret Army. He was in the cast of the BBC's Doctor Who to portray the Black Guardian in several serials (The Armageddon Factor from 1979 and the Mawdryn Undead / Terminus / Enlightenment trilogy in 1983). At around the same time as The Armageddon Factor, he featured in the radio version of The Hitchhiker's Guide to the Galaxy, playing Gargravarr. In the TV and LP versions, he voiced the computer Deep Thought. He also played the character Norl in the Blake's 7 episode "City at the Edge of the World" and Lord Angus in the 1983 Black Adder episode "Witchsmeller Pursuivant". Also in 1983, he joined many other Doctor Who cast and crew members at Longleat for the show's 20th anniversary celebrations.

In 1984, Dyall appeared in the BBC Miss Marple episode "The Body in the Library". His last role on television was as Marcade in the BBC Television Shakespeare production of Love's Labour's Lost. His role as Captain Slarn in the Doctor Who radio serial Slipback was recorded on 10 June 1985, just 14 days before his death, and was broadcast posthumously.

The 1985 Advanced Dungeons & Dragons album, First Quest, credits narration by the late Valentine Dyall.

== Filmography ==
- The Missing Million (1942) as Supporting Role (film debut) (uncredited)
- The Day Will Dawn (1942) as German Guard at Cell Door Hatchway (uncredited)
- Much Too Shy (1942) as Defence Counsel (uncredited)
- The Silver Fleet (1943) as Markgraf
- The Life and Death of Colonel Blimp (1943) as Von Schönborn
- Yellow Canary (1943) as German Commander
- Hotel Reserve (1944) as Warren Skelton
- Henry V (1944) as Duke of Burgundy
- Latin Quarter (1945) as Prefecture of Police
- Brief Encounter (1945) as Stephen Lynn as Alec's 'Friend' (uncredited)
- I Know Where I'm Going! (1945) as Mr. Robinson
- Pink String and Sealing Wax (1945) as Police Inspector
- Caesar and Cleopatra (1945) as 1st. Guardsman
- Night Boat to Dublin (1946) as Sir George Bell
- Cyprus Is an Island (1946) as Narrator (voice)
- The White Unicorn (1947) as Storton
- Corridor of Mirrors (1948) as Counsel for Defence (uncredited)
- Night Comes Too Soon aka The Ghost of Rashmon Hall (1948) as Dr. George Clinton
- My Brother's Keeper (1948) as Inspector at Milton Wells
- Woman Hater (1948) as Spencer
- The Story of Shirley Yorke (1948) as Edward Holt
- The Case of Charles Peace (1949) as Storyteller
- The Glass Mountain (1949) as Opera Narrator (uncredited)
- The Queen of Spades (1949) as St. Germain's messenger
- For Them That Trespass (1949) as Toastmaster at Drew Party
- Man on the Run (1949) as Army Judge Advocate
- Christopher Columbus (1949) as Narrator (voice)
- Doctor Morelle (1949) as Dr. Morelle
- Vengeance Is Mine (1949) as Charles Heywood
- Helter Skelter (1949) as Man Telling Story at BBC (uncredited)
- Diamond City (1949) as Opening Narration (uncredited)
- Miss Pilgrim's Progress (1949) as Superintendent
- Man in Black (1949) as The Man in Black – Story-Teller
- Golden Salamander (1950) as Ben Ahrim (uncredited)
- The Body Said No! (1950) as John Sutherland
- Room to Let (1950) as Dr. Fell
- Stranger at My Door (1950) as Paul Wheeler
- Salute the Toff (1952) as Inspector Grice
- Hammer the Toff (1952) as Inspector Grice
- Ivanhoe (1952) as Norman Guard
- Paul Temple Returns (1952) as Superintendent Bradley
- Strange Stories (1953) as Storyteller / Narrator
- The Final Test (1953) as Man in Black (uncredited)
- Knights of the Round Table (1953) as Narrator (uncredited)
- Johnny on the Spot (1954) as Tyneley
- The Devil's Jest (1954) as Intelligence Director
- Suspended Alibi (1957) as Inspector Kayes
- Night Train for Inverness (1960) as Inspector Kent
- Identity Unknown (1960) as Ambrose
- The City of the Dead aka Horror Hotel (1960) as Jethrow Keane
- Fury at Smugglers' Bay (1961) as Narrator (uncredited)
- Fate Takes a Hand (1961) as Wilson
- The Haunting (1963) as Mr. Dudley
- The Horror of It All (1964) as Reginald Marley
- Son of Oblomov (1964) as Tarantyev
- One Man Band (1965) as Sir Lance Corporal
- The Wrong Box (1966) as Oliver Pike Harmsworth
- The Mystery and the Pleasure (1966) as Narrator (voice)
- The Night of the Generals (1967) as German Radio Announcer (voice, uncredited)
- Casino Royale (1967) as Vesper Lynd's Assistant / Dr. Noah's Voice (uncredited)
- The Naked World of Harrison Marks (1967) as Narrator (voice)
- Bedazzled (1967) as God (voice, uncredited)
- Oedipus the King (1968) as Chorus Leader (voice)
- Secrets of Sex (1970) as The Mummy (voice)
- Lust for a Vampire (1971) as Count Karnstein (voice, uncredited)
- The Beast Must Die (1974) as Narrator of the Werewolf Break (voice, uncredited)
- The Great McGonagall (1975)
- The Slipper and the Rose (1976) as 2nd Major Domo
- Come Play with Me (1977) as Minister of Finance
- Arabian Adventure (1979) as Jinnee (voice)
- Peter and Paul (1981, TV Movie) as Seneca
- Britannia Hospital (1982) as Mr. Rochester (final film)

=== Television ===
- The Avengers (1968) as Butler
- Secret Army (1977-1979) as Dr. Pascal Keldermans
- Doctor Who (1979, 1983) as Black Guardian
- Blake's 7 (1980) as Norl
- All's Well That Ends Well (1981) as The Astringer
- The Hitchhiker's Guide to the Galaxy (1981) as Deep Thought
- Blackadder (1983) as Lord Angus
- Martin Luther, Heretic (1983) as Chancellor
- The Body in the Library (1984) as Lorrimer
- Love's Labour's Lost (1985) as Marcade

== Bibliography ==
- 1954: Unsolved Mysteries
- 1955: Famous Sea Tragedies
- 1957: Flood of Mutiny
