= Barbara Clegg =

British actress and scriptwriter (1926–2025)

- Born: Barbara Diana Clegg; 1 March 1926; Manchester, England
- Died: 7 January 2025 (aged 98)
- Occupations: Actress; scriptwriter
- Years active: 1956–1963 • 1980–1986 • 1997 • 2009–2011 • 2020
- Known for: First female screenwriter on Doctor Who

Barbara Diana Clegg (1 March 1926 – 7 January 2025) was a British actress and scriptwriter for television and radio. She was notable as the first woman to write on the television series Doctor Who.

== Early life ==
Clegg was born in Manchester, England on 1 March 1926. Her parents were Herbert Clegg and Ethel Moores, sister of Sir John Moores who founded the Littlewoods Empire and they ran an artificial flower making factory in Manchester. She spent her early years in Gatley.

After obtaining an English degree at Oxford University, Clegg decided to pursue a career in the theatre. Initial work as an understudy led to more substantial roles, most notably her turn as Cleopatra opposite Cyril Luckham's Caesar at the Liverpool Playhouse. A high-profile tour of Australia with Katharine Hepburn followed, performing plays such as The Merchant of Venice, but by this point Clegg was looking to move into television, a medium where more money could be made with roles in Emergency Ward 10 and The Dream Maker. She then started writing scripts and in 1961 contributed seven scripts for the television soap opera Coronation Street.

== Career ==
After writing for several radio and television serials, including for Crossroads and a radio dramatisation of The Chrysalids, Clegg was asked to submit ideas for the science fiction television series Doctor Who in 1981. Her storyline, titled The Enlighteners, involved a space-bound race using anachronistic sailing ships. Doctor Who script editor Eric Saward decided to use Clegg's story as the last part of a trilogy of three stories, known informally as the Black Guardian Trilogy, as it involved the return of the Black Guardian. She was the first woman to write a serial for Doctor Who.

To integrate The Enlighteners into the trilogy, portions of the story were rewritten at the request of the production team and the Black and White Guardians replaced the originally planned "Enlighteners". Since the title could no longer refer to those entities, the story was renamed Enlightenment. Clegg based some of the characters on a wealthy group of her relatives who, upon visiting her, had demanded constant entertainment, treating other family members almost as "lesser beings".

The serial was Barbara Clegg's only commission for Doctor Who, other story line ideas being rejected by Saward, and later Andrew Cartmel. However one of those ideas, "Point of Entry", was later written up as a full script by Marc Platt and released as part of Big Finish's series of Doctor Who: The Lost Stories. Another storyline, "The Elite", was later scripted by John Dorney and released in 2011.

She later wrote a book about the life of her uncle Sir John Moores, called The Man Who Made Littlewoods, which was published five weeks before his death in 1993.

== Personal life and death ==
She was married to Paul Johnstone of The Sky at Night from 1962 to 1976 (his death). Clegg died on 7 January 2025, at the age of 98. Her obituary was on Radio 4's Last Word.
