= The Five Doctors =

1983 Doctor Who 20th Anniversary Special

129 – "The Five Doctors"
- Doctor Who episode
- From left: Richard Hurndall, Peter Davison, Jon Pertwee and Patrick Troughton

Cast
- Doctors: Peter Davison – Fifth Doctor; Jon Pertwee – Third Doctor; Patrick Troughton – Second Doctor; Richard Hurndall – First Doctor; Tom Baker - Fourth Doctor (archive footage); William Hartnell – First Doctor (archive footage)
- Companions: Janet Fielding – Tegan Jovanka; Mark Strickson – Vislor Turlough; Elisabeth Sladen – Sarah Jane Smith; Carole Ann Ford – Susan Foreman; Nicholas Courtney – Brigadier Lethbridge-Stewart; Lalla Ward – Romana (archive footage)
- Others: Anthony Ainley – The Master; Philip Latham – Lord President Borusa; Dinah Sheridan – Chancellor Flavia; Paul Jerricho – The Castellan; David Banks – Cyber Leader; Mark Hardy – Cyber Lieutenant; Richard Mathews – Rassilon; Frazer Hines – Jamie McCrimmon; Wendy Padbury – Zoe Heriot; Caroline John – Liz Shaw; Richard Franklin – Captain Mike Yates; David Savile – Colonel Crichton; John Leeson – Voice of K9; Roy Skelton – Dalek Voice; John Scott Martin – Dalek Operator; Stuart Blake – Commander; Stephen Meredith – Technician; Ray Float – Sergeant; John Tallents – Guard; William Kenton – Cyber Scout; Keith Hodiak – Raston Robot

Production
- Directed by: Peter Moffatt
- Written by: Terrance Dicks
- Script editor: Eric Saward
- Produced by: John Nathan-Turner
- Music by: Peter Howell
- Production code: 6K
- Series: Special (1983)
- Running time: 90 minutes (original); 101 minutes (Special Edition)
- First broadcast: 23 November 1983 (first global); 25 November 1983 (first UK)

Chronology
← Preceded by The King's Demons	Followed by → Warriors of the Deep

"The Five Doctors" is a special feature-length episode of the BBC science fiction television series Doctor Who, produced in celebration of the series's 20th anniversary. Written by Terrance Dicks and directed by Peter Moffatt, the episode first aired in the United States on 23 November 1983, the anniversary date, and aired in the United Kingdom two days later. Peter Davison stars alongside returning actors Patrick Troughton and Jon Pertwee. Richard Hurndall portrayed the First Doctor, as original William Hartnell had died in 1975. Tom Baker declined to appear, so his absence was covered with footage from the unfinished serial Shada.

In the episode, the Doctor's first five incarnations and several of his companions (Janet Fielding, Mark Strickson, Carole Ann Ford, Elisabeth Sladen and Nicholas Courtney) are displaced from different points in time and transported to Gallifrey. They are forced to navigate various foes within the Death Zone, including a Dalek, Cybermen, Yeti and the Master, in order to uncover a Time Lord plot to access the secret of immortality.

== Plot ==
An unknown entity uses the Time Scoop to bring several of the previous incarnations of the Doctor; his former companions Susan Foreman, Sarah Jane Smith, and Brigadier Lethbridge-Stewart; and his enemies the Daleks, the Cybermen, a Raston Warrior Robot and a Yeti, from their respective time streams into the Death Zone on Gallifrey. The entity's attempt to grab the Fourth Doctor and Romana ends up trapping the two in the time vortex. The Fifth Doctor senses the disruption of his own timeline, and with his own companions Tegan and Turlough, travels to Gallifrey via his TARDIS, also ending up in the Death Zone, unable to travel farther with the TARDIS due to a force field projected by the Tomb of Rassilon, the tower at the centre of the Death Zone. The various Doctors lead their companions towards the Tower while avoiding the hostile forces.

In the Citadel on Gallifrey, the High Council of Time Lords have also detected the disturbance in the Doctor's timeline and the power drain from the Time Scoop, and Lord President Borusa has the Master summoned, to help rescue the Doctor, offering him a new set of regenerations and a pardon if he succeeds. The Master accepts, and is given a recall device by the Castellan and a copy of the High Council's seal before he is transmatted to the Zone. The Master encounters the Third Doctor, who dismisses him and accuses him of making the seal himself, before finding the Fifth just as they are surrounded by Cybermen. The Master is knocked out by a Cyberman's gun firing, and the Doctor finds and uses the recall device to return to the Citadel. When the Master awakes, he makes a pact with the Cybermen to lead them to the Tower.

As the other Doctors and companions converge on the Tower, the Fifth Doctor discovers the recall device given to the Master included a tracking signal to lead the Cybermen to him. The Castellan is found to possess the forbidden Black Scrolls of Rassilon, and dies while attempting to escape an invasive mind probe. When the Doctor returns to the High Council's chamber to report, he finds Borusa missing, and soon discovers a secret room with Borusa at the controls of the Time Scoop. Borusa reveals he seeks to be the President Eternal of Gallifrey and needed the Doctors to disable the force field over the Tomb in order to gain immortality from Rassilon's Ring and rule forever. Borusa uses his headgear, the Coronet of Rassilon, to compel the Doctor to do his bidding. Meanwhile, the Master meets the First Doctor and Tegan and rids himself of the Cybermen by letting them fall victim to the Death Zone's traps, before killing the Cyberleader with one of his subordinates' guns.

As Borusa expected, the other three Doctors and their companions have made it to the tomb chamber, bypassing the Yeti and Raston Warrior Robot, as well as phantoms of the Doctor's former companions Jamie McCrimmon, Zoe Heriot, Liz Shaw and Mike Yates. They ponder the meaning of writing in the tomb: "to lose is to win and he who wins shall lose". The Master arrives in the Tomb, but the Doctors' companions tie him up, with the Brigadier knocking him out for good measure. The Doctors disable the force field to summon the TARDIS, but this action allows Borusa and the Fifth Doctor to arrive via transmat. Borusa uses the Coronet to prevent the Doctors' companions from interfering while he speaks to Rassilon. An image of Rassilon appears above the tomb and offers Borusa his ring as the key to immortality. Borusa dons the Ring, but then shortly disappears, becoming living stone that is part of Rassilon's tomb. The First Doctor realised what fate the tomb's writing foretold: immortality, but at a cost of perpetual incarceration.

Rassilon frees the Fourth Doctor and Romana from the time vortex and returns the Master to his own time; the Doctors immediately refuse his offer for immortality. The First, Second and Third Doctors collect their respective companions and return to their time streams as well, leaving the Fifth Doctor with Tegan and Turlough. Chancellor Flavia arrives via transmat, with the Chancellery Guard, and, after learning of Borusa's fate, declares that the Doctor is now Lord President, a position he cannot refuse. The Doctor tells Flavia to return to the Citadel, as he will follow shortly, then quickly departs with his companions, as he has no intention of returning to Gallifrey any time soon. Tegan asks if he's planning to jet off across the galaxy in an old spaceship running from his people. With a grin, he replies that of course he is, as that's how his adventure started in the first place.

== Production ==
The working title for this story was "The Six Doctors". It would have been written by former script editor Robert Holmes and would have featured the Cybermen and their kidnapping of the five incarnations of the Doctor; in their attempt to extract Time Lord DNA to turn themselves into "Cyberlords", the twist being that the First Doctor and Susan would actually be android impostors (the former being the "Sixth Doctor" of the title) and the Second Doctor would have saved the day. Holmes dropped out at an early stage and another former script editor, Terrance Dicks, was brought in instead. Some elements of this plotline would be reused in Holmes' own The Two Doctors (1985) and in Chris Chibnall's "The Timeless Children" (2020).

The programme is officially a co-production with the Australian Broadcasting Corporation, although the production team were not aware of this during production and the agreement in effect amounted to little more than a pre-production purchase pact. Nathan-Turner's first choice of director for the story was Waris Hussein, who had directed the first-ever Doctor Who serial, An Unearthly Child, in 1963. Hussein was in America at the time and was unable to accept the offer. Nathan-Turner then asked another veteran director, Douglas Camfield, but he also declined.

The original script featured an appearance by the Autons, last seen in Terror of the Autons (1971). After being dropped into the Death Zone, Sarah would have been attacked by a group of them before being rescued by the Third Doctor. However, due to budgetary restrictions, the scene was dropped and replaced in the finished version. Just before she meets the Third Doctor, Sarah falls a few feet down what fans have generally considered a rather unconvincing slope. In the novelisation, Sarah actually steps off a cliff. This was what was originally intended in the script, but for budgetary reasons the sequence was changed.

Location filming took place at Cwm Bychan, Llanbedr. The Yeti costume used in the serial was last used in The Web of Fear in 1968. It had decayed badly in 15 years of storage, requiring dim lighting and selective camera angles during filming.

The story was prepared in two formats: the ninety-minute version and a four-part version, the latter designed for international distribution or repeat broadcasting in the ordinary series run. The episode breaks were, respectively, Sarah falling down the slope, the Cybermen placing their bomb outside the TARDIS while Susan and Turlough watch, and the Master appearing behind the First Doctor and Tegan while in the Dark Tower. This is the only programme from the classic series of Doctor Who for which all recorded and filmed material, including alternative and unused takes, fluffed scenes and so forth, still exists in broadcast-quality format. This allowed for the creation of a Special Edition of the story in 1995. "The Five Doctors" was recorded in four-channel stereo but broadcast in mono. The later DVD releases had a Dolby Digital 5.1 soundtrack.

In the various publicity photos of the five Doctors from this story, a waxwork model of Tom Baker from a 1980 Doctor Who Exhibition in Madame Tussauds was used. According to producer John Nathan-Turner, Baker had agreed to do the photocall for the 20th anniversary but, suspecting that he might not turn up, Nathan-Turner arranged for the waxwork to be on location.

The end credits featured a specially-mixed version of the theme music, which began with Delia Derbyshire's original 1960s arrangement and then segued into the Peter Howell arrangement being used by the series at the time (the former being played at a slightly higher speed to match the tempo and pitch of the latter). This arrangement was only used on this one occasion and was the last time that the Derbyshire version was heard during the show's original run. A unique arrangement of the opening credits music was also used, which ended in a brief coda phrase that was never used in any other serial.

=== Cast notes ===
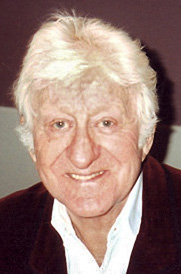
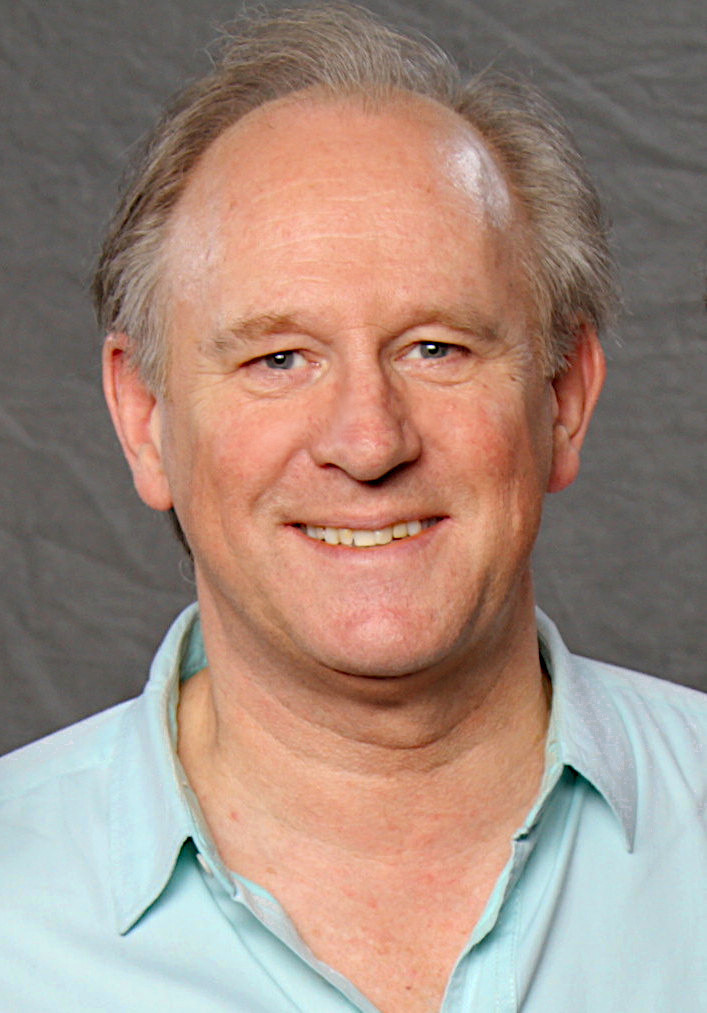
Three actors who led the series filmed for "The Five Doctors". From left to right: Patrick Troughton, Jon Pertwee, Peter Davison

The First Doctor was played by Richard Hurndall, replacing William Hartnell, who died in 1975. Hartnell makes an appearance in a pre-titles clip taken from the end of The Dalek Invasion of Earth (1964). After initially agreeing to take part, Tom Baker declined to return so soon after his departure from the series two years before, saying in 2014, "I didn't want to play 20 per cent of the part. I didn't fancy being a feed for other Doctors—in fact, it filled me with horror." His appearance was pieced together with footage from the unaired serial Shada.

In early drafts of the script, some of the Doctor and companion combinations were different. Originally, the Fourth Doctor would have been paired with Sarah Jane Smith, the Third Doctor with Brigadier Lethbridge-Stewart and the Second Doctor with Jamie McCrimmon. When Frazer Hines proved unavailable to reprise the role of Jamie for more than a cameo appearance, the script had to be altered, pairing the Second Doctor with Victoria Waterfield. This was revised again when Deborah Watling became unavailable to play Victoria and Baker decided not to appear, resulting in the pairings of the First Doctor with Susan, the Second with the Brigadier, the Third with Sarah Jane Smith, and the Fifth with Tegan and Turlough. Instead of meeting phantoms of Jamie and Zoe (Wendy Padbury), the Second Doctor and the Brigadier were originally scripted to meet Zoe and Victoria. The Doctor would have realised the truth about them when Victoria called Lethbridge-Stewart "Brigadier", when she only knew him as a Colonel (in The Web of Fear). Deborah Watling was unable to make the recording dates but Frazer Hines was able to free himself up for a day's shooting, so Jamie was written in instead.

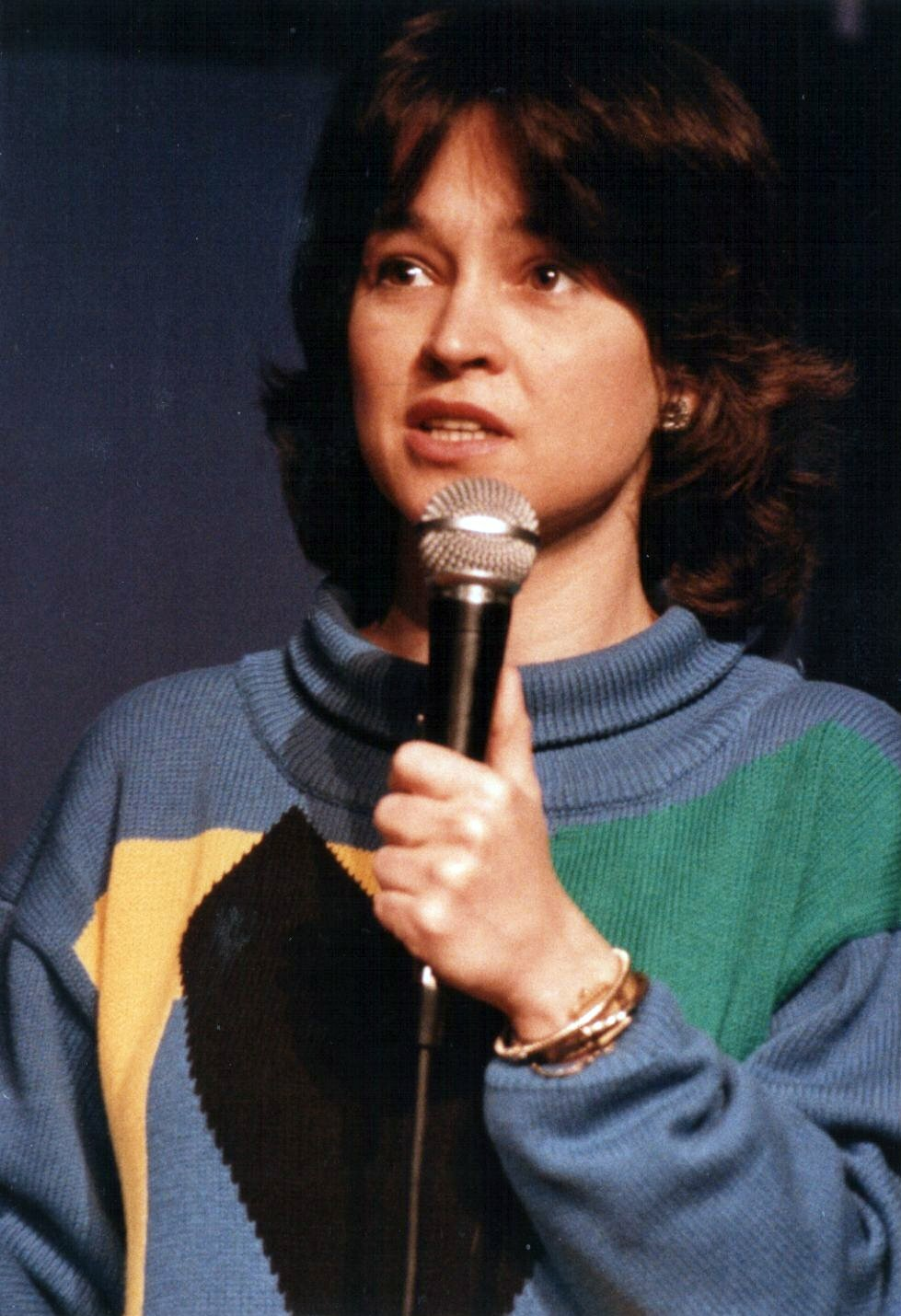
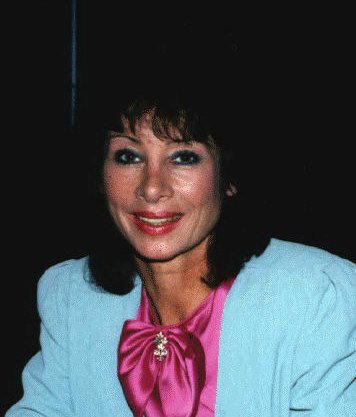
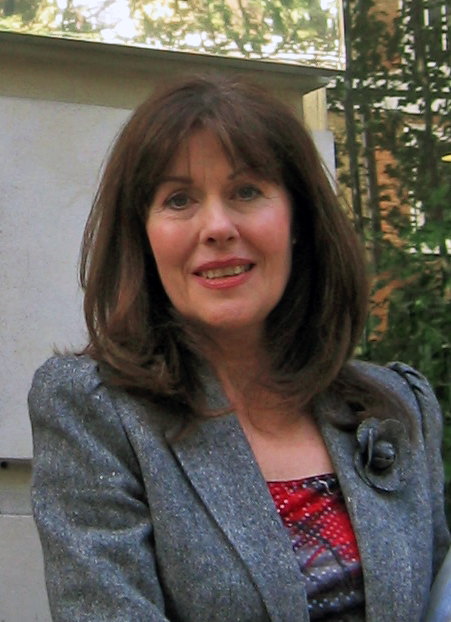
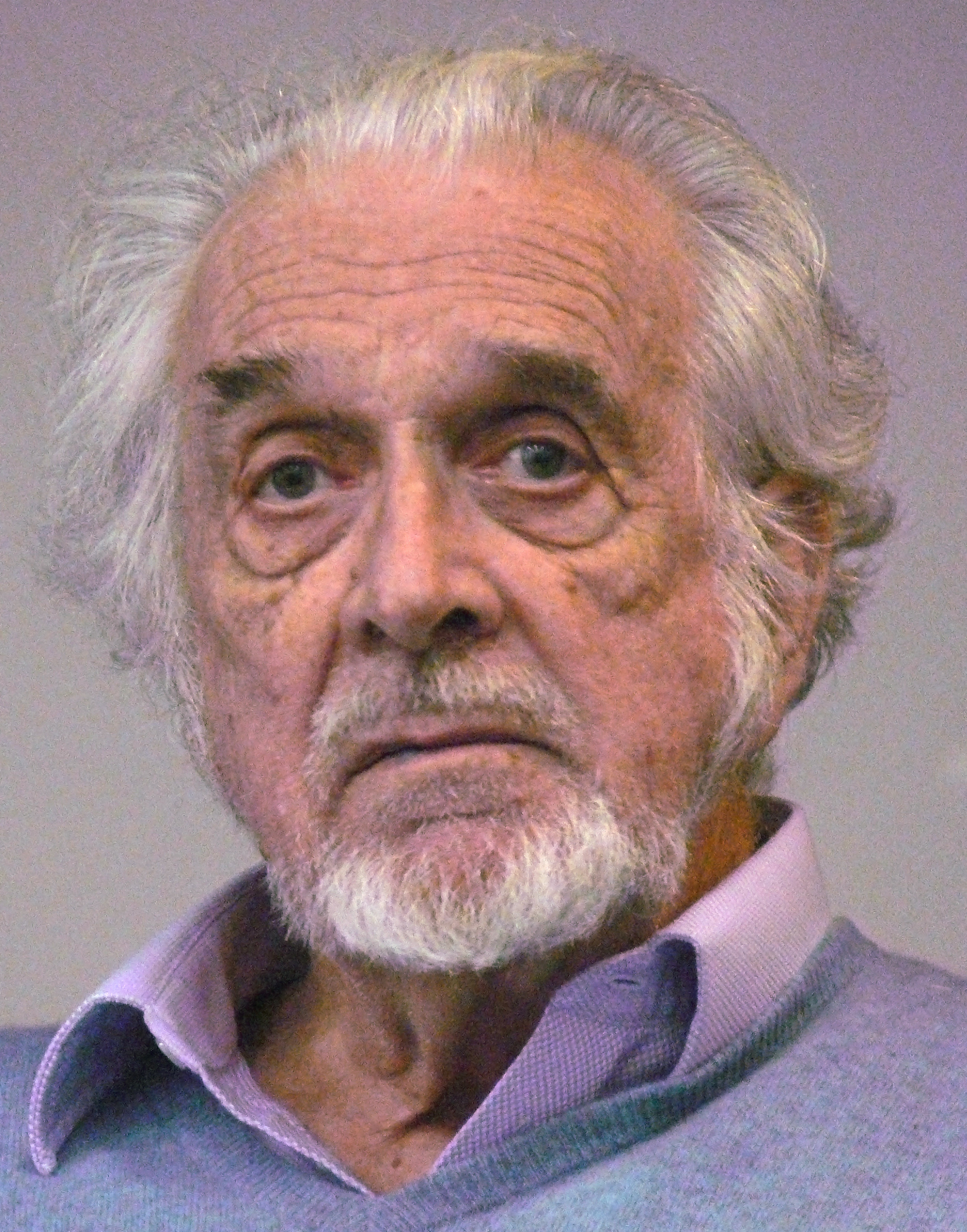
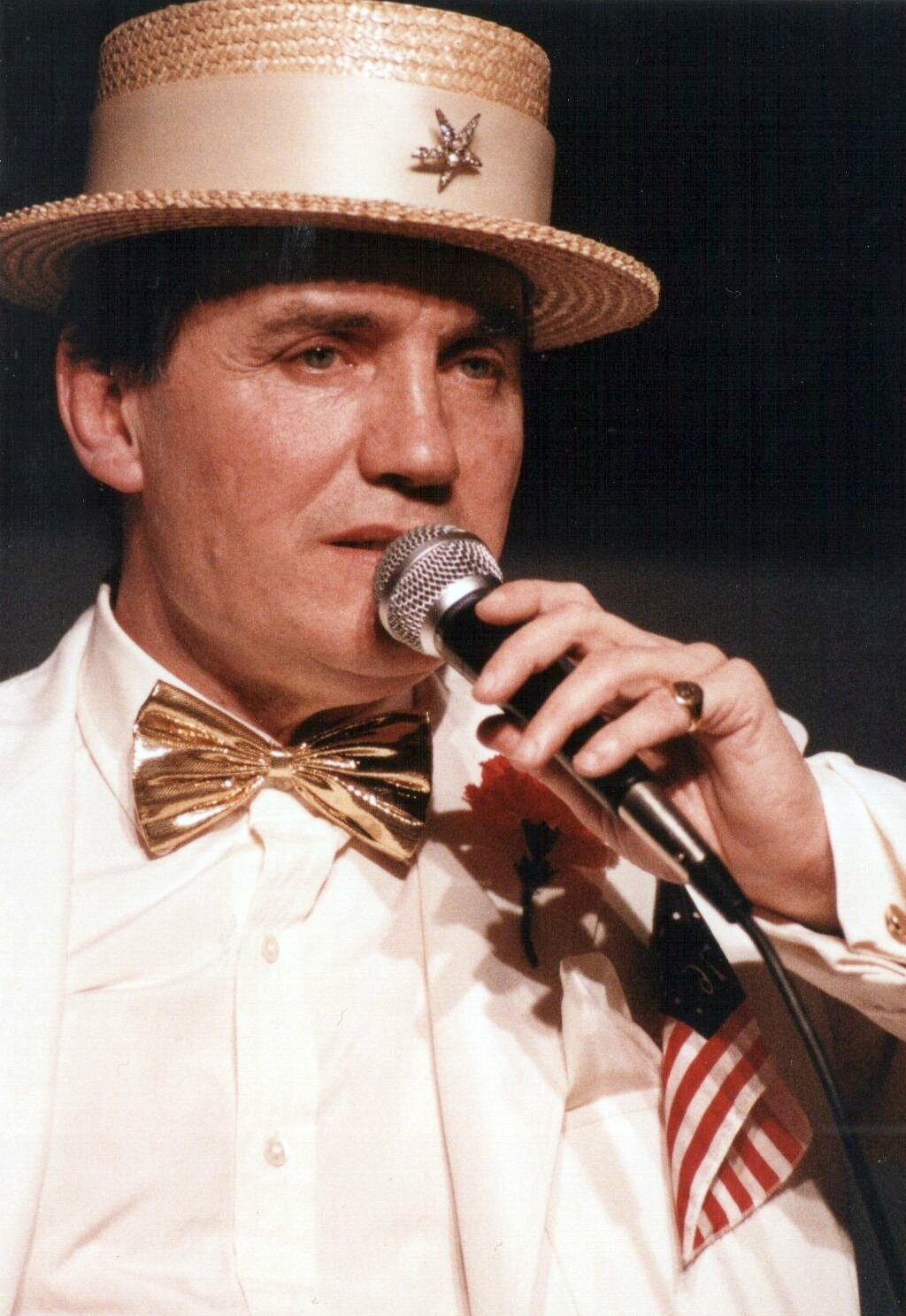
Supporting actors who appeared in "The Five Doctors"

John Levene was invited back as Sergeant Benton but objected to the script requiring Benton to not recognise the Second Doctor. Levene felt this was unfaithful to his character, who he felt would not forget the Second Doctor, and he declined to participate. The scene was filmed with actor Ray Float portraying an unnamed UNIT Sergeant.

In April 2013, Carole Ann Ford said John Nathan-Turner had initially insisted that Susan not refer to the Doctor as her grandfather: "You will not believe why. They said, 'We don't really want people to perceive him as having had sex with someone, to father a child.' I just screamed with hysterical laughter and said, 'In that case, I'm not doing it.'" The script was changed to include mentions of the characters' relationship.

== Broadcast and reception ==
Episode	Title	Run time	Original release date	UK viewers (millions)
1	"The Five Doctors"	90:23	25 November 1983	7.7

"The Five Doctors" was first broadcast in the United States on the actual date of the programme's 20th anniversary, airing on the Chicago PBS station WTTW and various other PBS member stations on 23 November 1983. The broadcast in the United Kingdom was delayed two days so it could coincide with the BBC's Children in Need charity night, with an outro in character by Peter Davison.

A four-part-serial version of the story was shown on BBC1, nightly between 14 August and 17 August 1984 at 6:15 p.m., achieving viewing figures of 4.7, 4.5, 3.7 and 4.8 million, respectively.

Paul Cornell, Martin Day and Keith Topping wrote of the special in The Discontinuity Guide (1995), "A fine anniversary tale, although don't analyse the plot too closely as it's largely a collection of set pieces without a great deal of substance. This is Terrance Dicks' loving tribute to a series that he helped to mould and, as such, contains everything that it should." In The Television Companion (1998), David J. Howe and Stephen James Walker stated that "The Five Doctors" "is not as bad as it could have been ... [but] the story fairly groans at the seams with the inclusion of so many 'old favourites'." Still, they felt that it worked as a one-off fun celebration.

In 2012, Patrick Mulkern of Radio Times gave the serial four stars out of five. He found the serial fun and made with a lot of love, though he noted the Third Doctor and Sarah Jane fared less well than some of the others. He also called it "Anthony Ainley's most effective outing" and praised the efficient scripting and other aspects of production aside from Moffatt's "sedate" direction. DVD Talk's Stuart Galbraith gave the story four out of five stars, finding Hurndall's performance as the First Doctor "the show's biggest, most delightful surprise". Writing for io9, Alasdair Wilkins said that the special was "far from perfect" and "a big, silly adventure", but worked "much better if you can selectively switch your brain off". Digital Spy's Morgan Jeffery gave the story three out of five stars, writing that it was "not the show's finest hour" but adding that it was "fun if enjoyed in the right frame of mind."

== Commercial releases ==
=== In print ===
The Five Doctors
- Author: Terrance Dicks
- Cover artist: Andrew Skilleter
- Series: Doctor Who book: Target novelisations
- Release number: 81
- Publisher: Target Books
- Publication date: 24 November 1983
- ISBN: 0-426-19510-8

A novelisation of this serial, written by Terrance Dicks, was published by Target Books in November 1983; it was the only Target novelisation to be published before its story was aired. The novelisation features numerous deleted scenes that subsequently turned up on the special-edition DVD release of this story.

=== Home media ===
"The Five Doctors" was first released on VHS and Betamax in September 1985, using a unique to home video edit trimmed to allow the release to use a 90m cassette. In 1990, the story was re-released, on VHS only, using the original UK broadcast edit. This version was also released on US LaserDisc in 1994.

A Special Edition of the episode (originally called the Collector's Edition), with updated special effects, surround-sound compatibility and an alternate editing of the raw material was released on VHS in 1995 in a box set with the video of The King's Demons and a limited-edition postcard album. This version also features a special BBC video ident, showing said ident being whisked away by the Time Scoop. The Special Edition was the first Doctor Who story to be released on DVD, on 1 November 1999. The Region 1 version has a commentary track by Peter Davison and Terrance Dicks. This would later be carried over to the 2008 re-release in Region 2.

On 22 August 2005 it was announced that "The Five Doctors" would be the first Doctor Who story to be made available to download to mobile phones, in a deal between BBC Worldwide and the technology firm Rok Player. The story was re-released as a 25th anniversary edition DVD on 3 March 2008. This release contains both the original broadcast version and the special edition. The special was a free gift in issue four of the Doctor Who DVD Files.

On 28 August 2015, "The Five Doctors" was released in Germany—with the German title Die Fünf Doktoren.

In September 2023, the story was released again in an upgraded format for Blu-ray, being included with the other stories from Season 20 in the Doctor Who - The Collection Box Set. This release featured the original 1983 version, updated with new special effects. The only change retained from the 1995 version was Rassilon's voice.

==== Special Edition differences ====
There are many differences between the original 1983 version of the episode and the 1995 special-edition version. Many of these changes were not carried over to the 2023 version.

- Several scenes have been extended with previously unused footage. Some scenes also have new musical cues.
- Some scenes are re-ordered to match the original script.
- At the beginning there are added scenes of the Dark Tower's exterior and interior.
- The Time Scoops' black triangles have been replaced with a new effect, resembling an upside-down whirlwind.
- The Time Scoop sent to capture the Fourth Doctor turns black before capturing him, visibly indicating a malfunction.
- Thunder sound effects have been added to the scenes of the First Doctor trapped in the mirror-maze as well as to the scene of him outside the front gate.
- There is a visual-effect added onto the Dalek in the mirror-maze after it is struck by its own weapon to suggest intensifying heat prior to it exploding.
- The Dark Tower slowly becomes visible through the destroyed wall panel after the Dalek explodes.
- All beam effects, including the boobytrapped checkerboard floor, have been redone.
- The effect of the Fifth Doctor and the phantoms fading away have been altered to look less similar.
- The image and visual effect of the Fourth Doctor stuck in the time-vortex has been changed: it no longer includes Romana.
- Rassilon's voice has been altered to sound more dramatic.
- The last scene of the Fourth Doctor returned to his proper place in space and time has been changed to a different clip from Shada.
- The scene at the end in which the various Doctors depart in their TARDISes has been replaced with "Time Scoops" departing instead.
- Whilst the Fifth Doctor and the Master are talking (having just met), the Cyberman who catches sight of them no longer says "Ah!" to himself.
- The music, dialogue and sound effects are re-mixed in stereo, with two exceptions: The pre-credits clip of William Hartnell, and the Delia Derbyshire arrangement of the theme tune during the first half of the credits.

=== Soundtrack ===
Doctor Who: The Five Doctors

Soundtrack album by Peter Howell and the BBC Radiophonic Workshop
- Released: 14 September 2018
- Recorded: 1983, 1995
- Genre: Soundtrack
- Length: 1:17:54
- Label: Silva Screen
- Producer: Mark Ayres

Doctor Who soundtrack chronology
Doctor Who: The Invasion (2018)	''Doctor Who: The Five Doctors'' (2018)	Doctor Who: Series 11 (2019)

BBC Radiophonic Workshop chronology
The Changes (2018)	Doctor Who: The Five Doctors (2018)	Possum (2018)

The complete original and special edition scores, as well as a selection of effects by Dick Mills was released on 14 September 2018. It was also released on 2-LP 28 September 2018, omitting the effects.

==== Track listing ====
All tracks are written by Peter Howell, except where noted

No.	Title	Length
1.	"Doctor Who – Opening Theme (The Five Doctors)" (Ron Grainer arr. Peter Howell)	00:36
2.	"New Console"	00:24
3.	"The Eye of Orion"	00:57
4.	"Cosmic Angst"	01:18
5.	"Melting Icebergs"	00:40
6.	"Great Balls of Fire"	01:02
7.	"My Other Selves"	00:38
8.	"No Coordinates"	00:26
9.	"Bus Stop"	00:23
10.	"No Where, No Time"	00:31
11.	"Dalek Alley and The Death Zone"	03:00
12.	"Hand in the Wall"	00:21
13.	"Who Are You?"	01:04
14.	"The Dark Tower / My Best Enemy"	01:24
15.	"The Game of Rassilon"	00:18
16.	"Cybermen I"	00:22
17.	"Below"	00:29
18.	"Cybermen II"	00:58
19.	"The Castellan Accused / Cybermen III"	00:34
20.	"Raston Robot"	00:24
21.	"Not the Mind Probe"	00:10
22.	"Where There's a Wind, There's a Way"	00:43
23.	"Cybermen vs Raston Robot"	02:02
24.	"Above and Between"	01:41
25.	"As Easy as Pi"	00:23
26.	"Phantoms"	01:41
27.	"The Tomb of Rassilon"	00:24
28.	"Killing You Once was Never Enough"	00:39
29.	"Oh, Borusa"	01:21
30.	"Mindlock"	01:12
31.	"Immortality"	01:18
32.	"Doctor Who Closing Theme – The Five Doctors Edit" (Ron Grainer arr. Delia Derbyshire and Peter Howell)	01:19
33.	"Death Zone Atmosphere"	03:51
34.	"End of Episode 1 (Sarah Falls)"	00:11
35.	"End of Episode 2 (Cybermen III variation)"	00:13
36.	"End of Episode 3 (Nothing to Fear)"	00:09
37.	"The Five Doctors Special Edition: Prologue (Premix)"	01:22
38.	"Doctor Who – Opening Theme (The Five Doctors Special Edition)" (Ron Grainer arr. Peter Howell)	00:35
39.	"The Five Doctors Special Edition: Prologue"	01:17
40.	"The Eye of Orion / Cosmic Angst (Special Edition)"	02:22
41.	"Melting Icebergs (Special Edition)"	00:56
42.	"Great Balls of Fire (Special Edition)"	00:56
43.	"My Other Selves (Special Edition)"	00:35
44.	"Nothing Can Go Wrong (Special Edition)"	00:35
45.	"Bus Stop (Special Edition)"	00:22
46.	"No Where, No Time (Special Edition)"	00:36
47.	"Enter Borusa (Special Edition)"	00:28
48.	"Enter The Master (Special Edition)"	00:14
49.	"Dalek Alley and The Death Zone (Special Edition)"	03:06
50.	"Hand in the Wall (Special Edition)"	00:20
51.	"Recall Signal (Special Edition)"	00:34
52.	"Who Are You? / Tell Me All About It (Special Edition)"	00:49
53.	"Thunderbolts (Special Edition)"	00:33
54.	"The Dark Tower (Special Edition)"	00:25
55.	"My Best Enemy (Special Edition)"	01:11
56.	"The Game of Rassilon (Special Edition)"	00:17
57.	"Cybermen I (Special Edition)"	00:22
58.	"Below (Special Edition)"	00:43
59.	"Cybermen II (Special Edition)"	01:12
60.	"The Castellan Accused / Cybermen III (Special Edition)"	00:35
61.	"Raston Robot (Special Edition)"	00:24
62.	"Not the Mind Probe (Special Edition)"	00:32
63.	"Where There's a Wind, There's a Way (Special Edition)"	00:31
64.	"Cybermen vs Raston Robot (Special Edition)"	02:04
65.	"Above and Between (Special Edition)"	01:41
66.	"The Fortress of the Time Lords (Special Edition)"	01:04
67.	"As Easy as Pi (Special Edition)"	00:22
68.	"I Hope You've Got Your Sums Right / Phantoms (Special Edition)"	02:29
69.	"The Tomb of Rassilon (Special Edition)"	00:29
70.	"Killing You Once was Never Enough (Special Edition)"	01:26
71.	"Oh, Borusa (Special Edition)"	01:21
72.	"Mindlock (Special Edition)"	01:11
73.	"Immortality (Special Edition)"	01:17
74.	"Doctor Who Closing Theme – The Five Doctors Edit (Special Edition)" (Ron Grainer arr. Delia Derbyshire and Peter Howell)	01:16
75.	"The Eye of Orion Atmosphere" (Dick Mills at the BBC Radiophonic Workshop)	03:07
76.	"Time Scoop" (Dick Mills at the BBC Radiophonic Workshop)	00:24
77.	"Transmat operates" (Dick Mills at the BBC Radiophonic Workshop)	00:09
78.	"Rassilon background" (Dick Mills at the BBC Radiophonic Workshop)	03:49
79.	"Borusa ring sequence" (Dick Mills at the BBC Radiophonic Workshop)	00:37
80.	"The Five Doctors Titles Zap"	00:10
Total length:		01:17:54

== See also ==
- The Three Doctors
- Dimensions in Time
- "The Day of the Doctor"
- "Twice Upon a Time"
- "Fugitive of the Judoon"
- "The Power of the Doctor"
- The Five(ish) Doctors Reboot
