= Tegan Jovanka =

Fictional character from Doctor Who

- Doctor Who character
- Janet Fielding as Tegan Jovanka
- First appearance: Logopolis (1981)
- Last appearance: "Tales of the TARDIS" (2023)
- Portrayed by: Janet Fielding; Sian Pattenden (young; uncredited)
- Duration: 1981–1985, 2022

In-universe information
- Full name: Tegan Jovanka
- Species: Human
- Gender: Female
- Occupation: Flight attendant
- Affiliation: Fourth Doctor; Fifth Doctor; Thirteenth Doctor; UNIT
- Children: Adopted Son
- Relatives: Andrew Verney (grandfather); Vanessa (aunt); Colin Frazer (cousin)
- Origin: Brisbane, Queensland, Australia
- Home: Earth
- Home era: 20th and 21st centuries

Tegan Jovanka is a fictional character played by Janet Fielding in the BBC television series Doctor Who. Tegan is a travelling companion of the Doctor from the end of his fourth incarnation (Tom Baker) and throughout his fifth incarnations (Peter Davison) between seasons 18 and 21.

In the series' narrative, Tegan is an Australian flight attendant who unwittingly joins the Doctor's crew of companions near the end of his fourth incarnation and stays with him almost until the end of his fifth incarnation. She serves as a rational, sardonic counterpoint to the perspectives of the fifth Doctor and his other companions. She first appeared in Logopolis (1981) and then in every serial until Resurrection of the Daleks (1984). While a vision of her was glimpsed in The Caves of Androzani (1984) the character did not return until she encountered the thirteenth Doctor (played by Jodie Whittaker) in "The Power of the Doctor" (2022), before she was reunited with the fifth Doctor in Tales of the Tardis (2023).

Series producer John Nathan-Turner developed the character specifically to generate Australian interest in Doctor Who casting Australian actress Janet Fielding as the first non-British actor to play a companion of the Doctor.

Tegan was devised to be more assertive than previous female companions. Her departure is notable for being motivated by the emotional toll of the Doctor's travels. She is also one of the Doctor's longest-serving companions.

== Appearances ==
=== Television ===
Tegan first appears in the Fourth Doctor's last serial, Logopolis (1981) where she is shown heading to Heathrow Airport to start a new job as an air steward with Air Australia, until a car breakdown forces her to use the services of a police box. This, she discovers is in fact the Doctor's disguised TARDIS. Inside she meets the Fourth Doctor and Adric, and with them is transported to the planet Logopolis, where they encounter Nyssa, abducted by The Master. With Adric and Nyssa, Tegan is present when the Doctor falls from the Pharos Project radio telescope and regenerates into his fifth incarnation, and she continues to journey with him and his other companions.

Tegan is stubborn, loud and direct, with a no-nonsense manner and is unafraid to speak her mind (in Earthshock she describes herself as "just a mouth on legs"). Her time in the TARDIS coincides with that of Adric, Nyssa, Turlough and Kamelion. While she often bickers with them (particularly with Adric) as well as with the Doctor, her integrity and loyalty are unquestionable. She is close enough to Nyssa to share a room with her aboard the Tardis, and is especially saddened by her leaving. Her initial distrust of Turlough is proven justified when he is revealed to be the Doctor's potential assassin, though they gradually become friends. The Doctor notes that she is a good coordinator, and often encourages her with the words, "Brave heart, Tegan." She is apparently able to speak at least one Indigenous Australian language fluently, and shows an aptitude with firearms.

After being left behind in Heathrow at the end of Time-Flight, she returns to the TARDIS a year later in the next adventure Arc of Infinity (in the interim the Doctor and Nyssa have been travelling together, according to the audio adventures). During the events of The Five Doctors she is summoned to Gallifrey's Death Zone where she meets the First Doctor, Second Doctor. Third Doctor, as well as Susan Foreman, Brigadier Lethbridge-Stewart and Sarah Jane Smith. Despite her strong front, her adventures with the Doctor, both thrilling and terrifying, eventually take a psychological toll. She is deeply upset by the death of Adric in Earthshock. Soon after, she is once again possessed by the alien intelligence known as the Mara. Eventually, the carnage surrounding the events of Resurrection of the Daleks proves too much and she bids an emotional good-bye to both the Doctor and Turlough in the London of 1984.

Tegan is one of the few companions of the classic series whose family are shown on screen. She had an Australian aunt in the UK named Vanessa (Dolore Whiteman). In Logopolis, it is said that Tegan's father owned an Australian farm. Tegan's English maternal grandfather Andrew Verney (Frederick Hall) was a local historian who had a cottage in the English village of Little Hodcombe in The Awakening, and her cousin Colin Frazer (Alastair Cumming) lived in Brisbane but was terrorised by Omega whilst back-packing in Amsterdam during Arc of Infinity.

Between her departure in 1984 and her cameo return in 2022, Tegan is frequently referenced. The Fifth Doctor sees an illusory image of her during his regeneration into the Sixth in The Caves of Androzani (1984). The Sixth Doctor refers to her in The Twin Dilemma (1985) and Attack of the Cybermen (1985). She is mentioned by Tenth Doctor when he meets the Fifth Doctor in Time Crash. In The Sarah Jane Adventures serial Death of the Doctor (2010), Sarah Jane Smith mentions knowing that Tegan has been a campaigner for the rights of Aboriginal Australians. The Eleventh Doctor references her in The Crimson Horror (2013).

While investigating the mysterious disappearances of scientists in The Power of the Doctor (2022), Tegan and fellow former companion Ace encounter the Thirteenth Doctor portrayed by Jodie Whittaker as well as current and former companions Ian Chesterton, Jo Grant, Mel Bush, Yasmin Khan, Graham O'Brien and Dan Lewis. Both Tegan and Ace are briefly reunited with their respective incarnations of the Doctor.

=== Other media ===
Fielding reprised the role in a 1985 sketch ("A Fix with Sontarans") for the children's show Jim'll Fix It, alongside Colin Baker as the Sixth Doctor. This sketch suggests that Tegan returned to working as a flight attendant and also frosted her hair blonde, before being accidentally returned to the TARDIS by the Sixth Doctor.

Tegan regularly appeared in the audio drama series Doctor Who: The Monthly Adventures produced by Big Finish Productions. She has also appeared in various short stories, novels and comics.

Tegan's life after journeying with the Doctor is investigated in the Big Finish Productions 2006 audio drama The Gathering. Although she finds it difficult to enter into relationships and is suffering from a terminal illness, she tells the Doctor that she has no regrets about her time with him, and now appreciates her life to the full. The spin-off fiction suggests that she was briefly married to pop star Johnny Chester (also known as Johnny Chess), the son of the First Doctor's companions Ian Chesterton and Barbara Wright. In the spin-off short story "Good Companions" by Peter Anghelides, Tegan has suffered a nervous breakdown and convinced herself that her time with the Doctor was a delusion.

Fielding first reprised her role as Tegan in a comedic promotional video for the Blu-ray release of Doctor Who season 19; she parodies a pre-flight safety demonstration for Peter Davison and Sarah Sutton, who appear as themselves.

The online special Farewell, Sarah Jane (2020) is set at Sarah Jane Smith's funeral and describes Tegan and Nyssa as "a nice couple from Australia". This was taken by publications to suggest that the two became romantically involved, however The Power of the Doctor appeared to negate this development, as Tegan mentions having previous husbands but does not refer to Nyssa as a partner.

In the online minisode The Passenger (2023), Tegan reunites with Nyssa, who has returned to Earth via the TARDIS. Tegan enters the TARDIS but finds a dark void where she encounters the Mara. Tegan then wakes, but the Mara's skull is seen in her mirror.

In Tales of the TARDIS (2023), produced to mark Doctor Who's 60th anniversary, Tegan and the Fifth Doctor are reunited aboard a "memory TARDIS" where they recollect the events of Earthshock.

They are again reunited in the mini-episode Destination: Daleks (2025), which serves as a sequel to Resurrection of the Daleks, showing the fifth Doctor returning Tegan to London's docklands, where they receive a distress signal from Turlough on Trion, under occupation by the Daleks

== Development ==
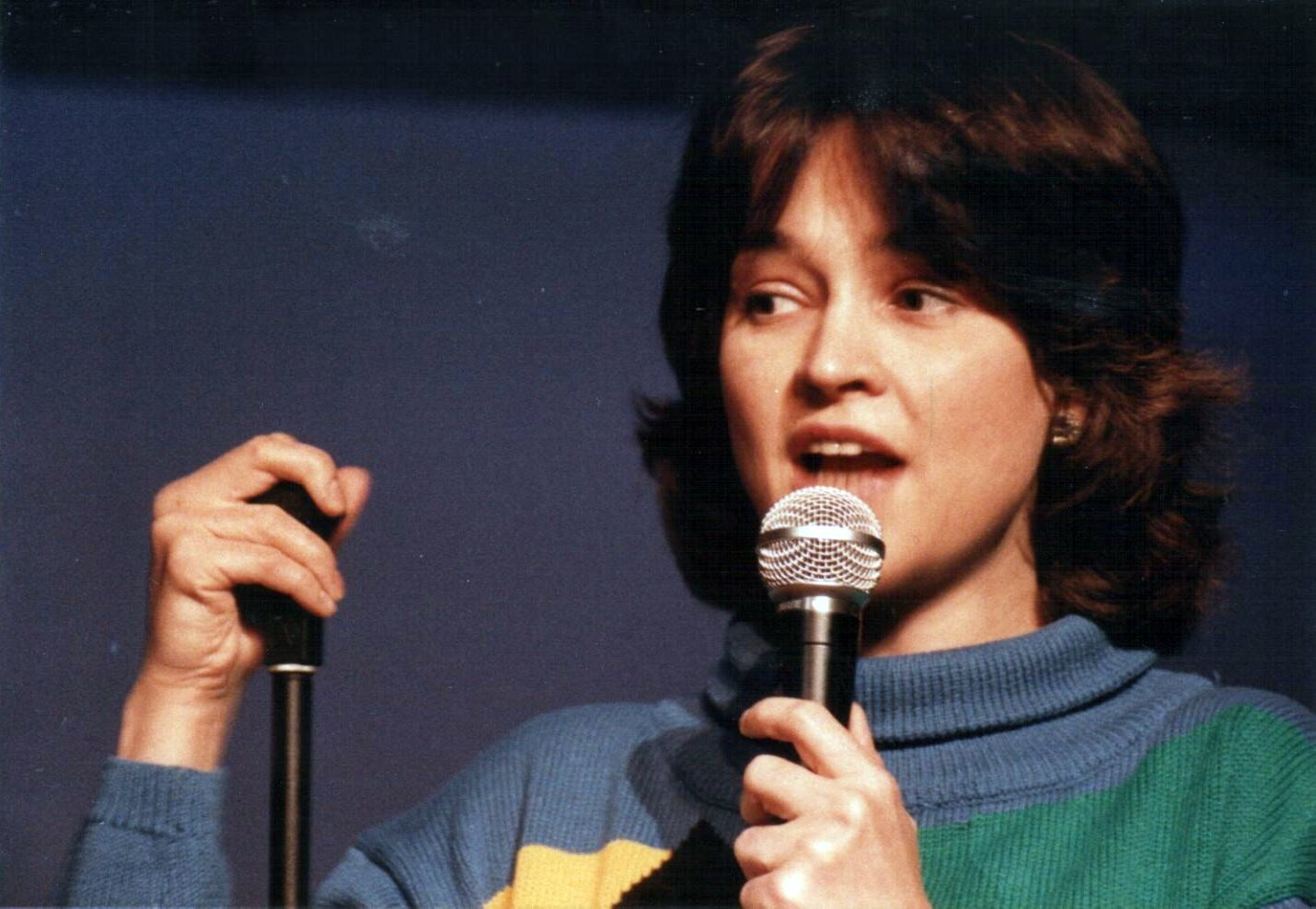
Janet Fielding portrays Tegan Jovanka

With the departure of characters Romana (Lalla Ward) and K9 (John Leeson) from Doctor Who in the 1981 serial Warriors' Gate, producer John Nathan-Turner planned to introduce a new travelling companion of the Fourth Doctor (Tom Baker), who would complement existing character Adric (Matthew Waterhouse). Nathan-Turner and script editor Christopher H. Bidmead decided the new character would be a female Australian flight attendant. Her nationality was possibly influenced by a letter Nathan-Turner received in November 1979 from BBC executive Graeme McDonald, inquiring whether upcoming episodes could be shot in Australia to increase the series' Australian viewership. The creation of an Australian character would help ensure sales to ABC TV and possibly attract co-production deals with Australian organisation. However by late July 1980 this was considered unfeasible. Nathan-Turner suggested two different names for the character: Tegan, after a friend's niece in Australia, or Jovanka, after Jovanka Broz, the widow of Yugoslav president Josip Broz Tito. Nathan-Turner wrote the names down as "Tegan (Jovanka)", leading Bidmead to mistakenly assume that this was the character's full name.

Nathan-Turner and Bidmead first outlined Tegan's character in August 1980. They described her as a 21-year-old Australian trainee air stewardess whose brash personality hid her insecurities; her self-confidence would cause problems for the Doctor and Adric. Tegan was planned to appear in at least three serials. Australian actresses were sought, and 109 actresses were seen for the part. One of the final applicants, 27-year-old Janet Fielding, was recommended to Nathan-Turner by a friend at the Actors' Alliance co-operative agency who remarked "You want a bossy Australian? They don’t come any bossier than this". Fielding was at first rejected, but later met with Nathan-Turner on 6 October, and subsequently auditioned. Fielding claimed she was 23 to improve her chances of getting the part, and though she was two inches too short to fit the requirements of an air stewardess, she lied to Nathan-Turner that Qantas and South-East Asian airlines had shorter height requirements. Fielding was formally offered the role on 23 October, and a press photocall announcing her casting was held in Hammersmith Park on the same day. Nathan-Turner wanted Fielding to dye her naturally dark brown hair red to differentiate her from Waterhouse.

As Baker was soon to be leaving the series, Nathan-Turner "thought that it might benefit the show if there were several companions aboard the TARDIS" when the Doctor regenerated into the Fifth Doctor (Peter Davison). In September 1980, Nathan-Turner decided to make Nyssa (Sarah Sutton), a supporting character introduced in the upcoming serial The Keeper of Traken (1981), a regular companion of the Doctor. Tegan was introduced in the following serial, Logopolis, which began broadcast on 28 February 1981. Tegan, Nyssa, Adric and the Fifth Doctor comprised the first four-person TARDIS team since the series began in 1963.

On her return to Doctor Who in 2022, Fielding had input into Tegan's history since leaving the Doctor.

Fielding has described Tegan as more assertive than typical female characters of the 1980s.
