= Doctor Who season 21 =

1984 season of British sci-fi TV series

Doctor Who
- Season 21
- Cover art of the Blu-ray release for the complete season
- Starring: Peter Davison; Janet Fielding; Mark Strickson; Gerald Flood; Nicola Bryant; Colin Baker
- No. of stories: 7
- No. of episodes: 24

Release
- Original network: BBC1
- Original release: 5 January – 30 March 1984

Season chronology
- ← Previous; Season 20 Next → Season 22

The twenty-first season of British science fiction television series Doctor Who began on 5 January 1984 with the Fifth Doctor (Peter Davison) serial Warriors of the Deep, and ended on 30 March 1984 with Colin Baker's first serial The Twin Dilemma. For the third time (the first being during Season 4 and second being Season 18), the entire TARDIS crew changed over the course of a single season. John Nathan-Turner produced the series, with Eric Saward script editing.

== Casting ==
=== Main cast ===
- Peter Davison as the Fifth Doctor
- Janet Fielding as Tegan Jovanka
- Mark Strickson as Vislor Turlough
- Gerald Flood as Voice of Kamelion
- Nicola Bryant as Peri Brown
- Colin Baker as the Sixth Doctor

==== The Doctor ====
Peter Davison makes his final regular appearance as the Doctor in The Caves of Androzani. Colin Baker makes his first full appearance as the Doctor in the final serial The Twin Dilemma.

==== Companions ====
Janet Fielding (Tegan Jovanka) and Mark Strickson (Vislor Turlough) continue their roles as the Fifth Doctor's companions for their final season, Janet Fielding leaves in Resurrection of the Daleks and Mark Strickson departs in Planet of Fire. New companion Peri Brown played by Nicola Bryant makes her first appearance in Planet of Fire.

The shape-shifting Android Companion Kamelion, played by Gerald Flood, makes his second and final appearance in Planet of Fire, though the character itself – along with other Fifth Doctor companions who left by this story (Tegan, Nyssa, Adric, and Turlough) – all make illusionary cameos as the Doctor regenerates at the climax of The Caves of Androzani.

=== Recurring actors ===
- Anthony Ainley as The Master

Anthony Ainley returns in Planet of Fire as the Master, which was intended to be his final appearance. Ainley, like other departed fifth Doctor companions make illusionary cameos as the Doctor regenerates.

=== Guest stars ===
Davros makes his first appearance since Destiny of the Daleks (1979) this time played by Terry Molloy.

== Serials ==
Episodes were broadcast twice weekly on Thursday and Friday evenings, with Resurrection of the Daleks broadcast on two consecutive Wednesday nights.

Resurrection of the Daleks was planned as a standard four-parter. However, the BBC's coverage of the 1984 Winter Olympics meant that Doctor Who's normal timeslot was unavailable. Rather than delay broadcasting the story, the decision was taken to produce it as a pair of double length episodes and broadcast it in the unfamiliar Wednesday timeslot.

The Caves of Androzani was the first time since Season 4's The Tenth Planet that the introduction of a new Doctor had taken place before the final serial of the season.

No. story	No. in season	Serial title	Episode titles	Directed by	Written by	Original release date	Prod. code	UK viewers (millions)	AI
130	1	Warriors of the Deep	"Part One"	Pennant Roberts	Johnny Byrne	5 January 1984	6L	7.6	65
130	1	Warriors of the Deep	"Part Two"	Pennant Roberts	Johnny Byrne	6 January 1984	6L	7.5	64
130	1	Warriors of the Deep	"Part Three"	Pennant Roberts	Johnny Byrne	12 January 1984	6L	7.3	62
130	1	Warriors of the Deep	"Part Four"	Pennant Roberts	Johnny Byrne	13 January 1984	6L	6.6	65
The TARDIS materialises in a seabase in the year 2084. Earth in the late 21st century is divided between two power blocs waging a bitter cold war, forever threatening to escalate into violent conflict. Mysterious accidents have been occurring on the seabase, including the deaths of key personnel. Investigating, the Doctor, Tegan and Turlough discover that not only have double agents infiltrated the seabase, but the Doctor's old foes, the Silurians and Sea Devils, are plotting to use the seabase to set off a war which will decimate humanity.
131	2	The Awakening	"Part One"	Michael Owen Morris	Eric Pringle	19 January 1984	6M	7.9	65
131	2	The Awakening	"Part Two"	Michael Owen Morris	Eric Pringle	20 January 1984	6M	6.6	63
The Doctor takes Tegan to the village of Little Hodcombe to visit her grandfather. The villagers, led by Sir George Hutchinson, are reenacting events from the English Civil War, including skirmishes which took place near the town. But the recreations have revived the Malus, an alien entity buried beneath a ruined church which feeds on the passions inflamed by war and death. Time is becoming distorted while Hutchinson – who has fallen under the Malus' influence – works to set the creature free, putting Tegan's life at risk in the process.
132	3	Frontios	"Part One"	Ron Jones	Christopher H. Bidmead	26 January 1984	6N	8.0	66
132	3	Frontios	"Part Two"	Ron Jones	Christopher H. Bidmead	27 January 1984	6N	5.8	69
132	3	Frontios	"Part Three"	Ron Jones	Christopher H. Bidmead	2 February 1984	6N	7.8	65
132	3	Frontios	"Part Four"	Ron Jones	Christopher H. Bidmead	3 February 1984	6N	5.6	65
The TARDIS arrives on the planet Frontios in the far future, where the last vestiges of humanity crashlanded years earlier. The struggling colony is beset by disasters, including deadly meteorite showers and the disappearance of several prominent colonists who have been sucked down beneath the ground. The Doctor, Tegan and Turlough discover that the culprits are the Gravis and his Tractators, giant insects with incredible powers over gravity. The Gravis intends to transform Frontios into an enormous spaceship, and spread the terror of the Tractators across the galaxy.
133	4	Resurrection of the Daleks	"Part One"	Matthew Robinson	Eric Saward	8 February 1984	6P	7.3	69
133	4	Resurrection of the Daleks	"Part Two"	Matthew Robinson	Eric Saward	15 February 1984	6P	8.0	65
The Doctor, Tegan and Turlough are nearly torn apart in a Dalek time corridor which connects a warehouse on modern-day Earth with a spacecraft in the future. The Daleks have lost the war with the Movellans due to a virus which affects only their kind. Now, with the help of the mercenary Lytton, they intend to free the imprisoned Davros and force him to create an antidote. Once successful, the Daleks will at last be in a position to destroy the Movellans and rampage across the cosmos.
134	5	Planet of Fire	"Part One"	Fiona Cumming	Peter Grimwade	23 February 1984	6Q	7.4	—
134	5	Planet of Fire	"Part Two"	Fiona Cumming	Peter Grimwade	24 February 1984	6Q	6.1	—
134	5	Planet of Fire	"Part Three"	Fiona Cumming	Peter Grimwade	1 March 1984	6Q	7.4	—
134	5	Planet of Fire	"Part Four"	Fiona Cumming	Peter Grimwade	2 March 1984	6Q	7.0	—
Turlough rescues a drowning botany student named Peri Brown and brings her to the TARDIS to recuperate. Before Peri can bid her farewells, Kamelion – once again under the Master's control – takes the TARDIS to the planet Sarn. There his mission is to find the Master, who has been diminished to just inches in height following a mishap with his tissue compression eliminator, and restore him using the healing properties of Sarn's miraculous numismaton flames. But Sarn hides a mysterious connection to Turlough's past – a connection which may prove to be the catalyst in the Master's scheme.
135	6	The Caves of Androzani	"Part One"	Graeme Harper	Robert Holmes	8 March 1984	6R	6.9	65
135	6	The Caves of Androzani	"Part Two"	Graeme Harper	Robert Holmes	9 March 1984	6R	6.6	—
135	6	The Caves of Androzani	"Part Three"	Graeme Harper	Robert Holmes	15 March 1984	6R	7.8	65
135	6	The Caves of Androzani	"Part Four"	Graeme Harper	Robert Holmes	16 March 1984	6R	7.8	68
After landing on the planet Androzani Minor, the Doctor and Peri develop lethal spectrox toxaemia poisoning. As the two search for a cure before it is too late, they become enmeshed in a decades-old feud between the disfigured roboticist Sharaz Jek and businessman Morgus. Jek falls in love with Peri, but the situation only degenerates when the girl rebuffs his affections. Between threats from Magma beasts and gun runners, it quickly becomes apparent that the Doctor will never find a cure in time to save both himself and his companion.
136	7	The Twin Dilemma	"Part One"	Peter Moffatt	Anthony Steven	22 March 1984	6S	7.6	61
136	7	The Twin Dilemma	"Part Two"	Peter Moffatt	Anthony Steven	23 March 1984	6S	7.4	66
136	7	The Twin Dilemma	"Part Three"	Peter Moffatt	Anthony Steven	29 March 1984	6S	7.0	59
136	7	The Twin Dilemma	"Part Four"	Peter Moffatt	Anthony Steven	30 March 1984	6S	6.3	67
The Doctor experiences serious regenerative instability, causing him to attack Peri and then decide to live as a hermit on the barren asteroid Titan 3. There he stumbles upon a plot by his old friend, the Time Lord Azmael, who has kidnapped twin mathematical geniuses named Romulus and Remus. Azmael's adopted planet, Jaconda, has been taken over by the sluglike Mestor and his Gastropods, forcing the Time Lord to do Mestor's bidding. But even Azmael is unaware of Mestor's true plan – to destroy Jaconda's sun, and thereby scatter Gastropod eggs throughout the universe.

== Production ==
Title card as used in the season finale The Twin Dilemma.

During this season, the title card was slightly modified for the final serial The Twin Dilemma, and continued during Colin Baker's reign as the Sixth Doctor until the end of the season 23 14 episode epic The Trial of a Time Lord.

=== Scrapped stories ===
After completing Snakedance, Saward asked Christopher Bailey to write another story. The initial outline for May Time was commissioned on 24 August 1982, in which the Doctor and his companions arrive at the court of Byzantium. Full scripts were commissioned on 16 September 1982 with the title Man-watch, but were dropped from production. A second attempt at the story entitled Children of Seth was attempted as a Sixth Doctor story, and scripts were commissioned on 14 July 1983. This failed because Bailey did not devise a structure for Doctor Who's new 45-minute-episode format or create a tangible villain for the Doctor to face. It was adapted as The Children of Seth by Marc Platt for Big Finish's The Lost Stories in December 2011.

Barbara Clegg pitched multiple stories, including The Elite, which would have featured a race of intelligent youths controlled by a lone Dalek, The Rogue TARDIS, which dealt with the Doctor searching for a missing Time Lord who has regenerated to merge with his TARDIS, and The Underworld, which would have seen the Doctor travel down the river Styx in ancient Greece. Eric Pringle submitted a pitch titled The Darkness alongside The Awakening, with the pitch thought to have included the Daleks in it. Robin Squire's Ghost Planet was scrapped, and is believed to have potentially incorporated the Sixth Doctor. Another script by Platt and J. Jeremy Bentham (Under the pseudonym Charles M. Stevens), Warmongers, was planned to include the Sontarans and Rutans during the Blitz, but ended up scrapped. Hex, by Peter Ling and Hazel Adair, was developed following plans from Nathan-Turner to create a sequel to 1960s soap opera Compact fell through and Nathan-Turner invited them to work on Doctor Who. After three months of development, Hex was scrapped.

Other story submissions included Circus of Destiny by Ben Steed, The House That Ur-Cjak Built by Andrew Stephenson, The Place Where All Times Meet by Colin Davis, Poison by Rod Beacham, and The SCI and The Zeldan by William Emms. A script by Stephen Gallagher, Nightmare County, was planned to feature a race known as the Vodyani who ran a reality simulator, with the Doctor, Tegan, and Turlough needing to escape it; this was scrapped by Saward due to cost concerns. It would later be adapted into an audio drama by Big Finish Productions.

== Broadcast ==
The entire season was broadcast from 5 January to 30 March 1984. Transmission moved to Thursdays and Fridays, except for Resurrection of the Daleks which was aired in two double-length episodes on Wednesdays due to the BBC's coverage of the 1984 Winter Olympics in Sarajevo, Yugoslavia.

== Home media ==
=== VHS releases ===
Season	Story no.	Serial name	Duration	Release date		
Season	Story no.	Serial name	Duration	UK	Australia	USA / Canada
21	130	Warriors of the Deep	4 × 25 min.	September 1995	July 1996	May 1997
21	131; 132	The Awakening; Frontios	6 × 25 min.	March 1997; 2 × VHS	March 1998	March 1998; 2 × VHS
21	133	Resurrection of the Daleks	4 × 25 min.	November 1993	February 1994	May 1994
21	134	Planet of Fire	4 × 25 min.	September 1998	January 1999	November 1998
21	135	The Caves of Androzani	4 × 25 min.	February 1992	May 1992	October 1992
21	136	The Twin Dilemma	4 × 25 min.	May 1992	May 1993	October 1993

=== DVD and Blu-ray releases ===
All releases are for DVD unless otherwise indicated:

- ^{(B)} indicates a Blu-ray release

Season	Story no.	Serial name	Duration	Release date		
Season	Story no.	Serial name	Duration	R2	R4	R1
21	130	Warriors of the Deep (Note: Only available as part of the Beneath the Surface box set in Regions 2 and 4. Available individually or in the box set in Region 1.)	4 × 25 min.	14 January 2008	5 March 2008	3 June 2008
21	131	The Awakening (Note: Only available as part of the Earthstory box set in Regions 2 and 4. Only available individually in Region 1.)	2 × 25 min.	20 June 2011	4 August 2011	12 July 2011
21	132	Frontios	4 × 25 min.	30 May 2011	7 July 2011	14 June 2011
21	133	Resurrection of the Daleks (Note: Available individually or in The Complete Davros Collection box set in Regions 2 and 4. Only available individually in Region 1.)	4 × 25 min. (Note: Resurrection of the Daleks was originally intended to comprise four 25-minute episodes, but was broadcast as two 46-minute episodes due to the BBC's coverage of the 1984 Winter Olympics. The DVD contains the story in a four-part format.)	18 November 2002	30 January 2003	1 July 2003
21	133	Resurrection of the Daleks (Special Edition) (Note: Only available as part of the Revisitations 2 box set in Regions 2 and 4. Only available individually in Region 1.)	4 × 25 min. (Note: Four-episode version); 2 × 46 min. (Note: Broadcast version)	28 March 2011	5 May 2011	12 June 2012
21	134	Planet of Fire (Note: Only available as part of the Kamelion Tales box set in Regions 2 and 4. Only available individually in Region 1.)	4 × 25 min. (Note: Broadcast version); 1 × 66 min. (Note: Special edition)	14 June 2010	5 August 2010	7 September 2010
21	135	The Caves of Androzani (Note: Available individually or in the Regeneration box set in Region 2. Only available individually in Regions 1 and 4.)	4 × 25 min.	18 June 2001	7 January 2002	2 April 2002
21	135	The Caves of Androzani (Special Edition) (Note: Only available as part of the Revisitations 1 box set in Regions 2 and 4. Only available individually in Region 1.)	4 × 25 min.	4 October 2010	2 December 2010	14 February 2012
21	136	The Twin Dilemma	4 × 25 min.	7 September 2009	3 December 2009	5 January 2010
21	130–136	Complete Season 21	34 × 25 min. 2 × 46 min. (Note: Broadcast version of Resurrection of the Daleks); 1 × 66 min. (Note: Special edition of Planet of Fire)	16 March 2026 ^{(B)}	6 May 2026 ^{(B)}	7 July 2026 ^{(B)}

== In print ==
Season	Story no.	Library no. (Note: Number in Target's Doctor Who Library, if applicable)	Novelisation title	Author	Hardcover release date (Note: Published by Target's parent companies (Allen Wingate, W. H. Allen, BBC Books) unless otherwise indicated)	Paperback release date (Note: Published by Target Books (or by BBC Books under the Target Collection umbrella) unless otherwise indicated)	Audiobook	
Season	Story no.	Library no.	Novelisation title	Author	Hardcover release date	Paperback release date	Release date (Note: Unabridged from BBC Audio / AudioGo unless otherwise indicated)	Narrator
21	130	87	Warriors of the Deep	Terrance Dicks	24 May 1984	16 August 1984	5 June 1995	Peter Davison
21	130	87	Warriors of the Deep	Terrance Dicks	24 May 1984	16 August 1984	4 May 2023	Janet Fielding
21	131	95	The Awakening	Eric Pringle	14 February 1985	13 June 1985	8 July 2010	Nerys Hughes
21	132	91	Frontios	Christopher H. Bidmead	20 September 1984	10 December 1984	2 March 2010 (Note: Published by the Royal National Institute of the Blind)	Beth Chalmers
21	132	91	Frontios	Christopher H. Bidmead	20 September 1984	10 December 1984	16 April 2015	Christopher H. Bidmead
21	133	—N/a	Resurrection of the Daleks	Eric Saward	18 July 2019	11 March 2021	1 August 2019	Terry Molloy (Note: Dalek voices by Nicholas Briggs)
21	134	93	Planet of Fire	Peter Grimwade	18 October 1984	17 January 1985	5 June 2025	David Banks
21	135	92	The Caves of Androzani	Terrance Dicks	15 November 1984	14 February 1985	1 November 2018	Peter Davison
21	136	103	The Twin Dilemma	Eric Saward	10 October 1985	13 March 1986	5 January 2012	Colin Baker
