= Frontios =

132 – Frontios
- Doctor Who serial

Cast
- Doctor: Peter Davison – Fifth Doctor
- Companions: Janet Fielding – Tegan Jovanka; Mark Strickson – Vislor Turlough
- Others: Jeff Rawle – Plantagenet; Peter Gilmore – Brazen; Lesley Dunlop – Norna; William Lucas – Range; Maurice O'Connell – Cockerill; Raymond Murtagh – Retrograde; Richard Ashley – Orderly; Alison Skilbeck – Deputy; John Gillett – The Gravis; William Bowen, George Campbell, Hedi Khursandi, Michael Malcolm, Stephen Speed – Tractators

Production
- Directed by: Ron Jones
- Written by: Christopher H. Bidmead
- Script editor: Eric Saward
- Produced by: John Nathan-Turner
- Executive producer: None
- Music by: Paddy Kingsland
- Production code: 6N
- Series: Season 21
- Running time: 4 episodes, 25 minutes each
- First broadcast: 26 January 1984
- Last broadcast: 3 February 1984

Chronology
← Preceded by The Awakening	Followed by → Resurrection of the Daleks

Frontios is the third serial of the 21st season of the British science fiction television series Doctor Who, which was first broadcast in four twice-weekly parts on BBC1 from 26 January to 3 February 1984.

Set in the far future, the serial involves the alien Gravis (John Gillett) enslaving the last surviving humans to mine the planet for use as a spaceship for the Gravis.

== Plot ==
The TARDIS lands in the far future, on the planet Frontios. An unknown enemy is attacking the planet with meteor showers and is disappearing several prominent colonists, including the colony's leader, Captain Revere. Revere's son, Plantagenet, becomes leader of the colony.

The Fifth Doctor, Tegan and Turlough emerge in the middle of the bombardment and decide to help the colonists. Following a second bombardment, the TARDIS is seemingly destroyed. Plantagenet orders the execution of the Doctor, but Turlough intercedes. Plantagenet tries to attack the Doctor but suffers a heart attack. The Doctor saves his life but Plantagenet is dragged into the ground.

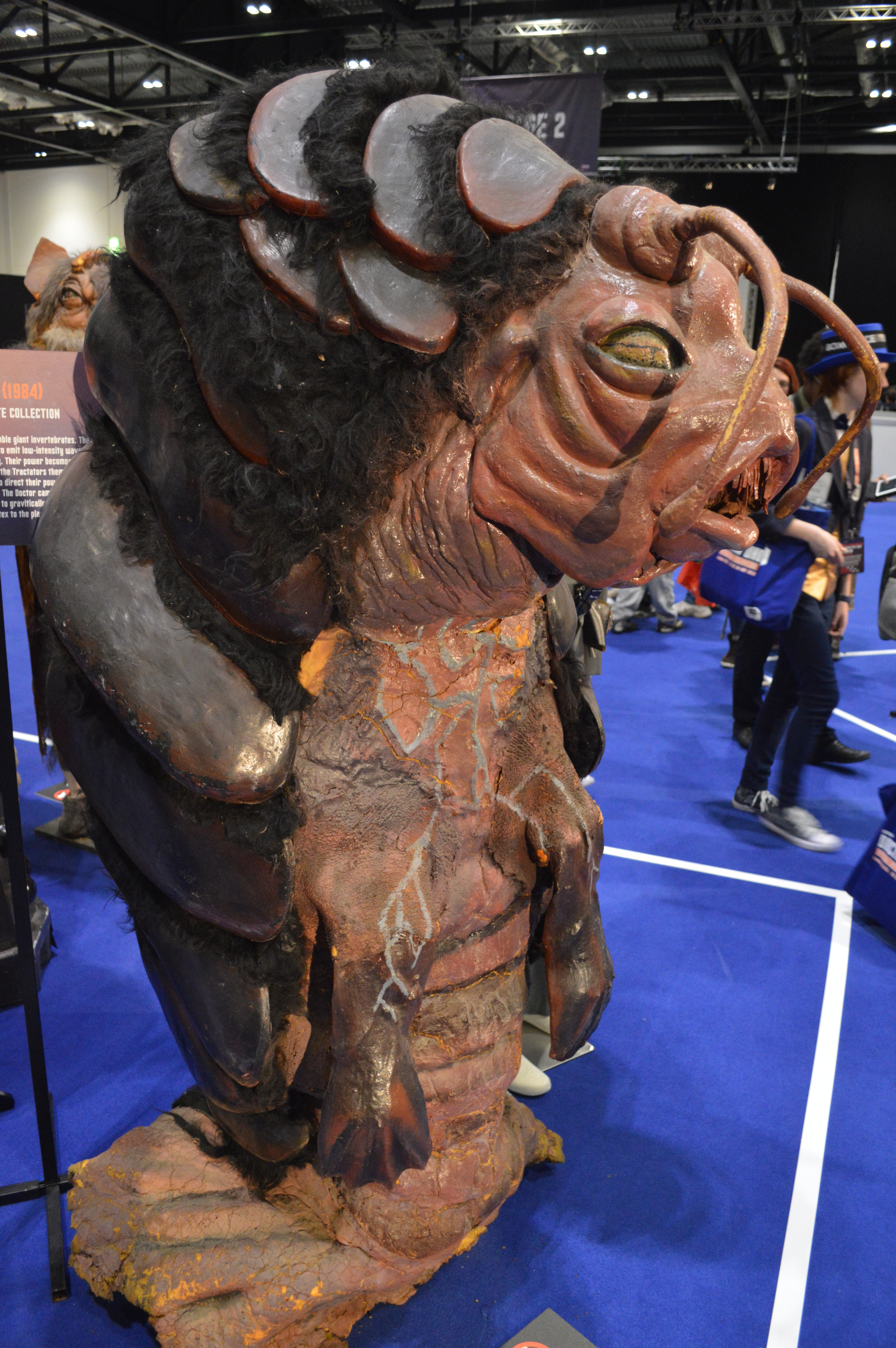
A Tractator, on display at a Doctor Who exhibition

The Doctor, Tegan and Turlough discover that the culprits are the Gravis and his Tractators, giant insects with powers over gravity. The Gravis is using the colonists to power his machines. He intends to transform Frontios into a spaceship to further spread the Tractators. The Doctor, Turlough, Brazen and his guards rescue Plantagenet by knocking out the Gravis, but Brazen is killed in the process.

Tegan finds bits of the TARDIS's inner walls in the tunnels. She is chased by the Gravis and two Tractators until she finds one of the TARDIS's inner doors and opens it. She finds herself in the TARDIS console room with the Doctor, Turlough and Plantagenet. The Doctor ushers the Gravis in and then tricks him into reassembling the TARDIS by using his power over gravity. The Gravis pulls the TARDIS back into its normal configuration. The fully-assembled TARDIS then serves to effectively cut the Gravis off from his fellow Tractators, which revert to a harmless state.

After depositing the now-dormant Gravis on the uninhabited planet of Kolkokron and returning to Frontios, the Doctor gives Plantagenet the hat stand as a farewell token and asks that his own involvement in the affair not be mentioned to anyone, especially the Time Lords. Once the TARDIS has left Frontios, its engines start making a worrisome noise. The Doctor appears to be helpless as the ship is being pulled towards the centre of the universe.

== Production ==
Episode	Title	Run time	Original release date	UK viewers (millions)
1	"Part One"	24:39	26 January 1984	8.0
2	"Part Two"	24:35	27 January 1984	5.8
3	"Part Three"	24:30	2 February 1984	7.8
4	"Part Four"	24:26	3 February 1984	5.6

Script editor Eric Saward contacted writer Christopher H. Bidmead in July 1982 with a view to writing a script. Its original title was The Wanderer[s]. The scripts were formally commissioned on 26 November 1982 under the title Frontious. The scripts were delivered on 16 February 1983 and accepted three weeks later subject to some rewrites. The director was Ron Jones, who had directed three earlier Fifth Doctor stories. The designer assigned to the serial, Barrie Dobbins withdrew from production due to a mental breakdown and was replaced by David Buckingham; Dobbins later died by suicide. He started on production on 8 July 1983, just six weeks before recording. Soon after this, another shock came to the production when actor Peter Arne, who had been hired to play Mr Range, was murdered on 1 August 1983. This was just hours after he had attended a costume fitting for his character at the BBC. His murder was reported widely in the British media the following day, with many reports making mention of his upcoming part in Doctor Who. He was replaced by William Lucas. Other actors of note featured in Frontios included Peter Gilmore (as Brazen), who had found fame during the 1970s in the lead role of The Onedin Line. Lesley Dunlop, playing Norna, was widely experienced, despite her being just 27 and went on to appear in Doctor Who again, in 1988's The Happiness Patrol. Jeff Rawle had also found fame in the 1970s as the lead in Billy Liar and later starred in The Sarah Jane Adventures story Mona Lisa's Revenge. It was during rehearsals for this story that Colin Baker was announced as the new actor, as Peter Davison had by this time decided to leave the show. Frontios was filmed in two three-day recording blocks in the BBC Television Centre's Studio 6 from 24 August to 9 September 1983.

Bidmead was instructed to include a monster in the script, something he was unhappy with since he felt that the Doctor Who monsters looked "cheap" and had limited dialogue. His two earlier stories, Logopolis and Castrovalva, featured no monsters. The Tractators were inspired by woodlice, which had infested his flat. Dancers were hired to wear the Tractator costumes with the idea that they would coil and twist their bodies in line with the idea of woodlice, but the costumes were too restrictive for this. The dancers were hired from Pineapple Studios. One glitch in the continuity of the series occurs in this story, as companion Kamelion is missing when the TARDIS is destroyed. The writers of The Discontinuity Guide theorise that he is disguised as the hatstand.

Soon after the story was broadcast, Saward commissioned Bidmead to write a story for Season 23 featuring the Tractators and the Master. This was ultimately abandoned as the series itself was soon put on hiatus. Frontios proved to be his last televised story for Doctor Who.

== Commercial releases ==
=== In print ===
Frontios
- Author: Christopher H. Bidmead
- Cover artist: Andrew Skilleter
- Series: Doctor Who book: Target novelisations
- Release number: 91
- Publisher: Target Books
- Publication date: 10 December 1984
- ISBN: 0-426-19780-1

The story was novelised by Bidmead and published by Target Books in December 1984. Bidmead includes many gruesome images of the Tractators technology including a hovering translation device. The cliffhanger that led into Resurrection of the Daleks is removed.

An unabridged reading of the novelisation by its author was released as a 4CD audiobook in April 2015.

=== Home media ===
Frontios was released on a double VHS set with The Awakening in March 1997. It was released on DVD in May 2011. This serial was also released as part of the Doctor Who DVD Files in Issue 100 on 31 October 2012.
