= Warriors of the Deep =

130 – Warriors of the Deep
- Doctor Who serial

Cast
- Doctor: Peter Davison – Fifth Doctor
- Companions: Janet Fielding – Tegan; Mark Strickson – Turlough
- Others: Tom Adams – Vorshak; Ian McCulloch – Nilson; Ingrid Pitt – Solow; Nigel Humphreys – Bulic; Tara Ward – Preston; Martin Neil – Maddox; Nitza Saul – Karina; James Coombes – Paroli (Note: Also provided the voice of Sentinel 6, uncredited.); Norman Comer – Icthar; Stuart Blake – Scibus; Vincent Brimble – Tarpok; Christopher Farries – Sauvix

Production
- Directed by: Pennant Roberts
- Written by: Johnny Byrne
- Script editor: Eric Saward
- Produced by: John Nathan-Turner
- Music by: Jonathan Gibbs
- Production code: 6L
- Series: Season 21
- Running time: 4 episodes, 25 minutes each
- First broadcast: 5 January 1984
- Last broadcast: 13 January 1984

Chronology
← Preceded by "The Five Doctors"	Followed by → The Awakening

Warriors of the Deep is the first serial of the 21st season of the British science fiction television series Doctor Who, which was broadcast in four twice-weekly parts on BBC1 from 5 to 13 January 1984.

In the serial, two human power blocs, along with members of the Silurians and Sea Devils, the original rulers of the Earth, battle for control over the nuclear missiles on an undersea military colony on Earth in 2084.

== Plot ==
Wanting to show Tegan what the future would look like, the Doctor has the TARDIS materialise in an underwater base on Earth in 2084. The base was built by one of the world's two superpowers and has nuclear weapons aimed at the other. The base's crew is led by Commander Vorshak and his senior officers, Nilson, Bulic and Preston. Unbeknownst to them, the a Silurian battlecruiser is monitoring the base.

The Silurians revive a group of Sea Devil warriors and their commander, Sauvix. The Silurians and Sea Devils attack the base and the Doctor warns Vorshak not to fire on them. Vorshak ignores him and the base's defenses are neutralised by the Silurians' deflection beam. The Silurians dispatch the Myrka, a large marine monster which kills several people on its way to the bridge. The Doctor destroys it with an ultraviolet device.

The Sea Devils break in and start the push for the bridge. A group take Tegan and the Doctor as prisoners. The Doctor confronts the lead Silurian, Icthar, about the massacre. Icthar intends to get mankind to destroy itself by triggering a global war. The Doctor escapes from the bridge and discovers some cylinders of hexachromite gas, which is lethal to all reptile life. Preston urges the Doctor to use the gas on all of the Silurians and Sea Devils, but the Doctor refuses. He changes his mind when Turlough reminds him of what the Silurians intend to do. The Doctor begins to connect the gas containers to a central air pump but is discovered by Sauvix before he can turn the pump on. As the Silurians prepare to fire the missiles, the Doctor feeds the gas into the ventilation system. Bulic stays in the chemical store to ensure that the gas keeps flowing, while the Doctor and his companions leave for the bridge to try to stop the Silurians.

The warriors begin to collapse from the gas and the Doctor tells Tegan and Turlough to give the Silurians oxygen to keep them alive. The Doctor, aided by Vorshak, tries to stop the missiles by linking himself into the equipment as the sync operator. The Doctor succeeds, but Vorshak is killed by Icthar, who himself is killed by Turlough, leaving the Doctor, his companions and Bulic the only survivors. Left in despair, the Doctor laments the deaths.

== Production ==
Episode	Title	Run time	Original release date	UK viewers (millions)
1	"Part One"	24:48	5 January 1984	7.6
2	"Part Two"	24:04	6 January 1984	7.5
3	"Part Three"	24:02	12 January 1984	7.3
4	"Part Four"	24:28	13 January 1984	6.6

Early in the production of the story, Prime Minister Margaret Thatcher announced the 1983 United Kingdom general election. This created a sudden demand for BBC studio space and, as a result, the production schedule for the story unexpectedly lost two weeks. Production was completed, but many signs of hurried production are evident. Many scenes had little or no rehearsal, and many scenes received only one take. One of the biggest problems came with the Myrka costume, which was completed only about an hour before it was scheduled to be used, meaning that the two puppeteers inside could not be fitted and had no time to rehearse in it. The costume smelled strongly of paint and adhesive, which one puppeteer said made him feel like he was sniffing glue. The paint on the costume had not dried by the time filming started, and tended to rub off on the sets and other costumes, as can be spotted in several scenes.

Many in the cast and production crew have expressed a sense of disappointment with the quality of the finished show; the DVD commentary by visual effects designer Mat Irvine, script editor Eric Saward, Peter Davison and Janet Fielding contained many criticisms of Pennant Roberts' direction of the story and John Nathan-Turner's production of the programme, as well as comments on the special effects, sets and other production problems (the Myrka specifically caused a great deal of amusement). The scenes with the Myrka in Part Three were also later used by former BBC One controller Michael Grade during his appearance on Room 101 as an example of why he found Doctor Who pathetic and wanted to get rid of it. Scriptwriter Johnny Byrne was unhappy with numerous alterations and edits that Eric Saward made to his script, notably the deaths of the human characters of Preston and Commander Vorshak, who were originally intended to survive. However, in an interview for the DVD's extra features, Byrne said he thought that the basic story was quite solid and effective.

This story was Byrne's final televised Doctor Who story. Byrne later submitted a pitch entitled The Guardians Of Prophecy, which was a sequel to The Keeper of Traken (1981), featuring the Sixth Doctor battling an evil immortal with an army of Melkurs who were threatening the remainder of the Traken Union. However, Byrne did not develop this submission any further. The Guardians of Prophecy was later 'recreated' as part of the Big Finish series of "Lost Stories". Warriors of the Deep was shot on 1-inch Type C videotape, the first Doctor Who story to do so. Type C videotape replaced 2-inch Quadruplex videotape on Doctor Who and many other shows.

=== Cast notes ===
Stuntman Gareth Milne, who had played George Cranleigh in Black Orchid (1982), doubled for Peter Davison when the Doctor fell in the tank at the climax of episode one. Ingrid Pitt, who played Dr. Solow, had previously played Queen Galleia in The Time Monster (1972) alongside Jon Pertwee. Vincent Brimble who played Tarpok later played Gerald in "Village of the Angels" (2021) alongside Jodie Whittaker. Stuart Blake who played Scibus, previously appeared in the 1983 Special "The Five Doctors" as a Commander and appeared with Tom Baker as Zoldaz in State of Decay (1980).

It was during production of this story that Peter Davison and Janet Fielding announced to Nathan-Turner their departures from the series.

== Commercial releases ==
=== In print ===
Warriors of the Deep
- Author: Terrance Dicks
- Cover artist: Andrew Skilleter
- Series: Doctor Who book: Target novelisations
- Release number: 87
- Publisher: Target Books
- Publication date: 16 August 1984
- ISBN: 0-426-19561-2

This story, originally written by Johnny Byrne, was novelised by former Doctor Who script editor Terrance Dicks and published by Target Books in 1984. Dicks gives a long recap of the Doctor's past with the Silurians and confirms Icthar is indeed the survivor of their first encounter. Dicks also specifies that the two opposing human superpowers are the East and West blocs, something that is left ambiguous in the televised story. The book was re-released in 1992 with new cover art by Alister Pearson.

In 1995 the novel was also issued by BBC Audio as an audio book, read by Peter Davison.

=== Home media ===
Warriors of the Deep was released on VHS in September 1995. The story's original soundtrack was released on CD along with Doctor Who and the Silurians (1970) and The Sea Devils (1972) as part of the 'Monsters on Earth' tin set in October 2006 and linking narration was provided by Janet Fielding. The CD was re-issued individually in January 2008. The serial was released on DVD as part of a boxed set called Beneath the Surface with Doctor Who and the Silurians and The Sea Devils on 14 January 2008. This serial was also released as part of the Doctor Who DVD Files in Issue 83 on 7 March 2012.
