= The Awakening (Doctor Who) =

131 – The Awakening
- Doctor Who serial

Cast
- Doctor: Peter Davison – Fifth Doctor
- Companions: Janet Fielding – Tegan Jovanka; Mark Strickson – Vislor Turlough
- Others: Polly James – Jane Hampden; Denis Lill – Sir George Hutchinson; Glyn Houston – Colonel Ben Wolsey; Jack Galloway – Joseph Willow; Keith Jayne – Will Chandler; Frederick Hall – Andrew Verney; Christopher Saul – Trooper

Production
- Directed by: Michael Owen Morris
- Written by: Eric Pringle
- Script editor: Eric Saward
- Produced by: John Nathan-Turner
- Music by: Peter Howell
- Production code: 6M
- Series: Season 21
- Running time: 2 episodes, 25 minutes each
- First broadcast: 19 January 1984
- Last broadcast: 20 January 1984

Chronology
← Preceded by Warriors of the Deep	Followed by → Frontios

The Awakening is the second serial of the 21st season of the British science fiction television series Doctor Who, which was originally broadcast on BBC1 on 19 and 20 January 1984.

The serial is set in the fictional English village of Little Hodcombe in 1984. In the serial, a psychic alien creature called the Malus takes control of Sir George Hutchinson (Denis Lill) to feed and awaken it with the help of deadly re-enactments of the English Civil War.

== Plot ==
The Fifth Doctor promises to take his companions Tegan and Turlough to 1984 so Tegan can spend some time with her grandfather, Andrew Verney. The Doctor sets the coordinates to Little Hodcombe, where Verney resides. However, the TARDIS experiences some turbulence and arrives in what appears to be the 17th century, but is actually a historical reenactment of the English Civil War, led by the village's magistrate, Sir George Hutchinson.

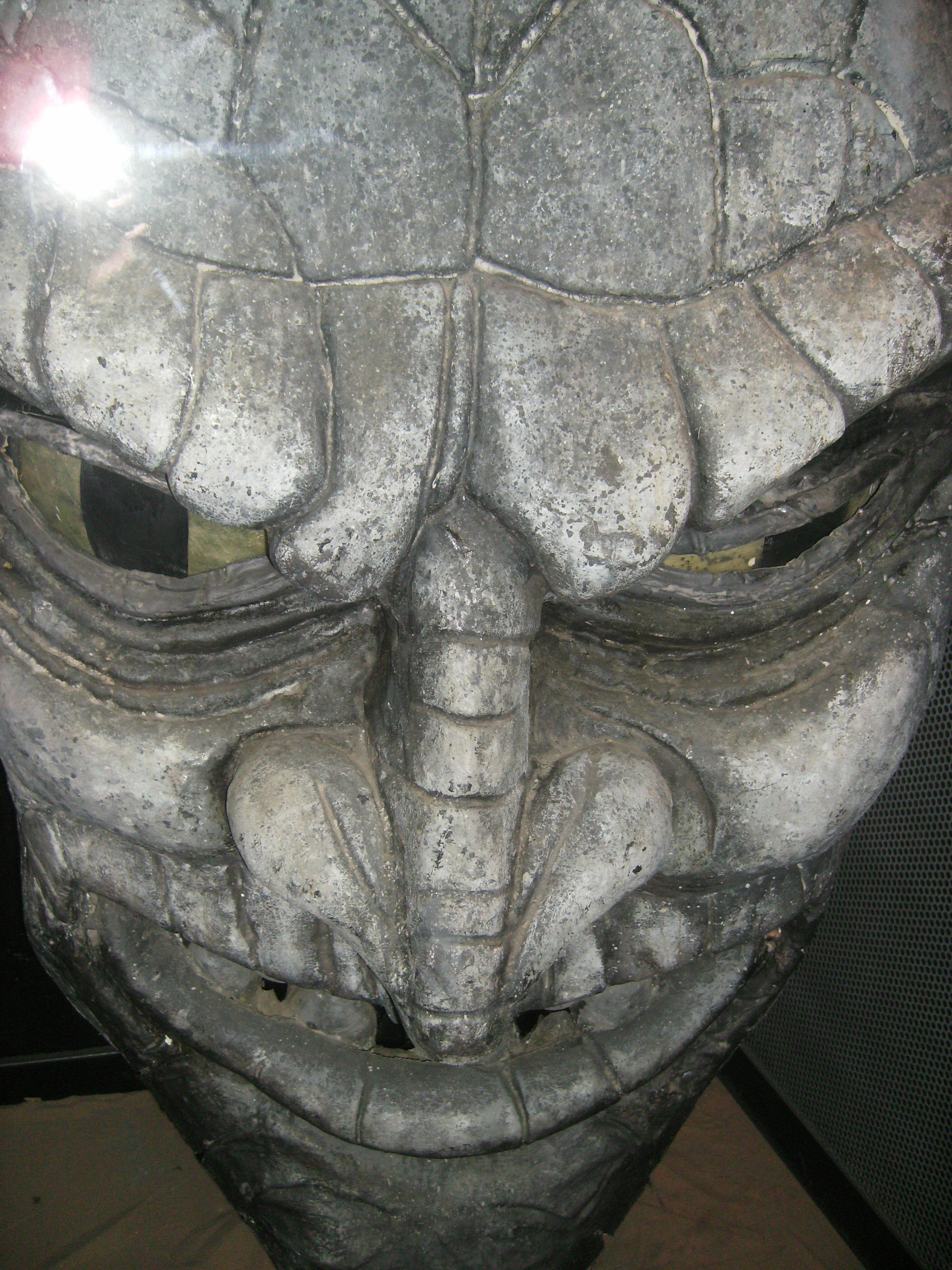
The Malus prop, on display at a Doctor Who exhibition

Hutchinson explains that the village is celebrating the anniversary of the Battle of Little Hodcombe and urges the Doctor to join the celebration. The Doctor discovers that the war games are being used to feed a creature called the Malus, which feeds on psychic energy. Tegan is taken prisoner and forced to change into a 17th-century costume to become the Queen of the May, who will be burned alive in a special ceremony. The Doctor and local schoolteacher Jane Hampden try to persuade Hutchinson to stop the games, as the final battle will be for real. Hutchinson refuses and orders Colonel Ben Woolsey to kill the Doctor. However, once Hutchinson leaves, Woolsey joins forces with the Doctor and rescues Tegan. The Doctor and his two companions, along with Woolsey and Hampden, work together to defeat the Malus and stop Hutchinson.

Tegan, still wanting to visit her grandfather, persuades the Doctor to stay in Little Hodcombe for a while.

== Production ==
Episode	Title	Run time	Original release date	UK viewers (millions)
1	"Part One"	25:18	19 January 1984	7.9
2	"Part Two"	24:47	20 January 1984	6.6

The two episodes were combined into a single omnibus edition broadcast on 20 July 1984, reaching 4.4 million viewers.

The working titles of this story were War Game and Poltergeist. Pringle had submitted this story in the mid-1970s to then-script editor Robert Holmes as a four-part story entitled War Game. In the 1980s he resubmitted his story (as well as a different four-parter, The Darkness, possibly featuring the Daleks) to script editor Eric Saward. Realising the story did not have enough impact for four episodes, it was later pared down to two, renamed Poltergeist and then finally The Awakening. John Nathan-Turner liked the character of Will Chandler a great deal and seriously considered keeping him on as a companion. However, it was eventually concluded that Chandler's childlike character would quickly wear thin and lacked any clear path of development, so Nathan-Turner dropped the idea.

The story featured extensive location shooting and studio work. Two villages are used to portray Little Hodcombe: Shapwick in Dorset and Martin in Hampshire. Saward wanted to add a TARDIS sequence with Tegan and Kamelion, utilising the robot prop and played in chameleonic form by Peter Davison and Mark Strickson. However, this scene was cut from the transmitted episode for timing reasons. The recovery of an early edit of episode one on video (in the personal archive of late producer John Nathan-Turner) means that this element, previously thought lost, was included on the DVD release of the serial. A small part of the scene has appeared in the documentary Kamelion: Metal Man, which featured on the DVD release of The King's Demons.

The master tape for Part One was found to have some scratch damage when the 1984 compilation version was being mastered; no protection copy was made at that time so the original tx master continued to deteriorate. The tape was checked in the early 1990s and the scratch damage found to be far more intrusive than it had been in 1984; fortunately, the original film sequences were kept and using these, the compilation copy, and the reprise from part 2, the Doctor Who Restoration Team was able to make a repaired master copy in 1997, which was used for the VHS release.

This was officially the final Doctor Who story to consist of two 25-minute episodes. All two-parters since then have been 45 minutes long per episode, including most of season 22 and several stories of the revived series.

The production designer for this story, Barry Newbery, had worked on Doctor Who intermittently ever since its very first story. After completing Awakening, Newbery took early retirement from the BBC, making this story his last professional effort.

== Commercial releases ==
=== In print ===
The Awakening
- Author: Eric Pringle
- Cover artist: Andrew Skilleter
- Series: Doctor Who book: Target novelisations
- Release number: 95
- Publisher: Target Books
- Publication date: 13 June 1985
- ISBN: 0-426-20158-2

A novelisation of this serial, written by Eric Pringle, was published by Target Books in February 1985.

=== Home media ===
The Awakening was released on a double VHS set with Frontios in March 1997. The DVD was released in a box set named Earth Story along with The Gunfighters on 20 June 2011.
