= Resurrection of the Daleks =

133 – Resurrection of the Daleks
- Doctor Who serial

Cast
- Doctor: Peter Davison – Fifth Doctor
- Companions: Janet Fielding – Tegan Jovanka; Mark Strickson – Vislor Turlough
- Others: Rodney Bewes – Stien; Rula Lenska – Styles; Del Henney – Colonel Archer; Maurice Colbourne – Lytton; Chloe Ashcroft – Professor Laird; Philip McGough – Sergeant Calder; Terry Molloy – Davros; Jim Findley – Mercer; Leslie Grantham – Kiston; Sneh Gupta – Osborn; Roger Davenport – Trooper; John Adam Baker, Linsey Turner – Crewmembers; William Sleigh – Galloway; Brian Miller, Royce Mills – Dalek Voices; John Scott Martin, Cy Town, Tony Starr, Toby Byrne – Daleks

Production
- Directed by: Matthew Robinson
- Written by: Eric Saward
- Script editor: Eric Saward
- Produced by: John Nathan-Turner
- Executive producer: None
- Music by: Malcolm Clarke
- Production code: 6P
- Series: Season 21
- Running time: 2 episodes, 46 minutes each
- First broadcast: 8 February 1984
- Last broadcast: 15 February 1984

Chronology
← Preceded by Frontios	Followed by → Planet of Fire

Resurrection of the Daleks is the fourth serial of the 21st season in the British science fiction television series Doctor Who, which was first broadcast in two weekly parts on BBC1 on 8 February and 15 February 1984. The serial was intended to be transmitted as four 23-minute episodes but a late scheduling change by the BBC meant that it was transmitted as two episodes of 46 minutes. Broadcast reruns and the 2002 DVD release restored it to its intended format, although the BBC i-player retains the original format.

Written by the series' script editor, Eric Saward, the serial marks the Fifth Doctor's only encounter with the Daleks on television, last seen in Destiny of the Daleks (1979), the debut of Terry Molloy as the third actor to play the Daleks' creator, Davros, and the final regular appearance of Janet Fielding as companion Tegan Jovanka.

== Plot ==
A group of humanoids in 1984 London are shot by policemen led by Commander Lytton, a mercenary working for the Daleks. Stien escapes into a time corridor. Lytton transports back to his battle cruiser in the far future and prepares to attack a prison space station holding Davros. The Daleks take over the station and release Davros from his cryogenic imprisonment.

The Fifth Doctor, Tegan, and Turlough are dragged down a time corridor in the TARDIS and emerge in the London Docklands. They meet Stien, and all return to the warehouse to hunt for the time corridor. Turlough stumbles into the time corridor and ends up on the Dalek ship. Having learned that the Doctor is in the warehouse, the Supreme Dalek orders a Dalek to detain him. It travels through the time corridor and kills several men before being destroyed.

Lytton explains that the Daleks lost their war against the Movellans because of a virus that attacks Dalek tissue; they freed Davros to find a cure. Davros demands that he remain on the station while researching the virus. When Lytton leaves to discuss this with the Supreme Dalek, Davros uses a mind control device to take control of a human.

The Doctor and Stien take the TARDIS to the Dalek ship; Stien reveals that he is an agent of the Daleks. A Dalek patrol closes in to exterminate the Doctor, but Lytton tells them that the Supreme Dalek has ordered that the Doctor be taken alive. The Daleks plan to clone the Doctor and his companions and use them to assassinate the Gallifrey High Council.

In the duplication chamber, Stien becomes confused: the Doctor tries to reawaken his ability to think for himself. As the mind-copying sequence nears completion, Stien breaks his conditioning and stops the process, freeing the Doctor. The Doctor finds Turlough and Tegan, and they return to the TARDIS. The Doctor decides to destroy Davros but loses his chance when Stien's conditioning re-asserts itself.

Davros dispatches his Daleks to Earth. Anticipating resistance from the Daleks not loyal to him, Davros opens a capsule of the Movellan virus. Two Daleks enter with the intention of killing him but are killed by the virus. At the warehouse, Davros' Daleks battle those loyal to the Supreme Dalek. The Doctor returns through the time corridor, realising that the "unexploded bombs" discovered earlier contain the Movellan virus. He opens one and places it behind the Daleks, who start to die.

Davros prepares to flee, but the Movellan virus starts to infect him. Meanwhile, Stien activates the self-destruct sequence that destroys the station and the Dalek ship, killing him. The Doctor and his companions prepare to leave but Tegan refuses and stays on Earth.

== Production ==
The working titles of this story were The Return, Warhead, and The Resurrection. The story was originally due to be produced as the climax of season 20. However, due to an electricians' strike, the story was postponed and, with minor rewrites, resurrected for season 21.

The story was originally supposed to have been directed by Peter Grimwade, whose work on Saward's previous story Earthshock had pleased the writer. When the story was postponed, Grimwade took members of the production team out to dinner, but did not invite John Nathan-Turner, because he had intended to take Nathan-Turner out separately. Nathan-Turner felt slighted by the omission and refused to allow Grimwade to direct the story when it was rescheduled for season 21. Matthew Robinson, who had never worked on the series before but had a "reputation as an action director", was used instead. However, Saward had already promised Grimwade that he could provide a script for the season, so Grimwade was allowed to write the following story, Planet of Fire. As well as the change of director, the serial's postponement also meant that Michael Wisher, who had originated the role of Davros in Genesis of the Daleks (1975), became unavailable. Matthew Robinson cast Terry Molloy instead and showed him the tape of Wisher's performance.

The filming location for the serial was Shad Thames and Butler's Wharf in September 1983, with studio scenes videotaped at TC8 of BBC Television Centre between September and October.

=== Story format ===
This story was intended to be four parts of the usual 23-minute length. However, due to the BBC's coverage of the 1984 Winter Olympics held in Sarajevo, Yugoslavia, the series' regular slot was not available. Rather than interrupt transmission, the decision was taken to transmit the story as two double-length episodes (46 minutes per episode), on consecutive Wednesdays rather than season 21's normal Thursday/Friday timeslot. It is often asserted that it was directly because of the success of the two-part experiment that the following season was produced in the same format: however, this decision had already been made.

The first copy of the story to be sold to American PBS stations by the BBC was done in the original four-part serial format. However, part two had a raw soundtrack, lacking sound effects and music. The compilation version, in which the entire story is compressed into one feature-length episode, had the entire second half with the raw soundtrack, but the second quarter with music and effects intact. The portions with the raw soundtrack also included some extra scenes not used in the final four-part cut.

=== Cast notes ===
It is wrongly stated by Matthew Robinson on the DVD commentary that this serial is the television debut of actor Leslie Grantham. He had actually made his debut in 1982 as a character called Boollie in a BBC2 Playhouse production called "Jake's End". Grantham was offered the role of either Galloway or Kiston, and chose the latter because it would afford him more screen time and was a more challenging role. He was soon cast as "Dirty" Den Watts in the soap opera EastEnders, again being cast on the recommendation of Matthew Robinson; following his return to the soap opera in 2004, his character addressed another character, wheelchair-using Ian Beale, as 'Davros', and encountered a police officer named 'Kiston', meta-references to his appearance in Doctor Who. Doctor Who would shortly afterwards reference Den Watts in 2006's "Army of Ghosts" as part of a sequence showing international culture, including EastEnders, adapting to the sudden appearance of silvery ghosts across the world.

== Broadcast and reception ==
Episode	Title	Run time	Original release date	UK viewers (millions)
1	"Part One"	46:24	8 February 1984	7.3
2	"Part Two"	46:52	15 February 1984	8.0

In Doctor Who: The Complete Guide, Mark Campbell awarded Resurrection of the Daleks two out of ten, describing it as "an ultra-violent, soulless remake of Earthshock. Beneath the technobabble, endless continuity references, silly hats and abysmally acted death scenes, there's no sign of a plot." In 2019, Paul Mount of Starburst described it as "a collision of clunky ideas artlessly welded together, dodgy dialogue, ropey characterisation and a plot that meandered and wandered [...] Resurrection, with its stratospherically high body count and unremittingly grim tone, was far darker and messier than the show ever needed to be."

For Radio Times, Mark Braxton awarded the serial three stars out of five. He stated, "There's serious intent here: a grim, Euston-Films landscape of deserted docklands; sturdy, open sets; disturbing music; and a high, TV-watchdog-needling body count." He praised the performances of Rodney Bewes and in particular the "top of the form" Maurice Colbourne, and "complexity in the story", which has "gnarly grey areas of the kind that we're more familiar with in the Moffat era", but added "the story doesn't really enlarge the Dalek mythos." He concluded that "parts of the plot seem tacked on and ill-considered: the whole duplicates business makes little sense. And there is so much in the way of homage that Resurrection of the Daleks is less than the sum of its parts. Is it enjoyable? Yes. Does it feel like a proper story? Sadly not." The serial was awarded four stars out of five by Andrew Allen in a review for Cultbox. Allen thought the story bore a closer resemblance to a Blake's 7 episode than a standard Doctor Who story with its "grim-faced mercenaries, disaffected crew members" and "unrelenting body count". Although he thought the "location filming in Wapping looks wonderful", he was critical of "perfunctory" production aspects including the presentation of the Daleks "without fanfare, majesty or indeed a fresh lick of paint", and Davros' introduction "glowering behind a sheet of frosted plastic, unremarked upon for a healthy chunk of screentime". He also thought it was "not a great story to serve as Janet Fielding's swansong". Overall, he concluded that it was "not the best Dalek story" but "quite far from the worst: full of drive, energy, and quite genuinely never a dull moment."

== Commercial releases ==
=== In print ===
Doctor Who – Resurrection of the Daleks
- Author: Eric Saward
- Series: Doctor Who novelisations
- Publisher: BBC Books
- Publication date: 18 July 2019
- Pages: 208
- ISBN: 978-1-785-94433-8

A fan group in New Zealand published an unofficial novelisation of the story in 2000, later republishing it as an online eBook titled Doctor Who: Resurrection of the Daleks. The novelisation by Eric Saward was released in hardcover on 18 July 2019. and an audiobook edition followed on 4 July 2019. A Target Books edition was published in paperback on 11 March 2021.

=== Home media ===
Resurrection of the Daleks was released on VHS in November 1993. Both the VHS (now out of print) and DVD releases of this story reverted to the four-episode format. The previously unused episode breaks are when the first Dalek comes through the time corridor in the warehouse, and in the second half of the story, when Davros begins preparing the Movellan virus, promising to exact vengeance on the Doctor and set himself up as the leader of a new Dalek race.

The original VHS cover art was designed by Bruno Ellitori. Fellow Doctor Who cover artist, Colin Howard, describes Ellitori's Resurrection cover as an example of how the series' VHS covers were becoming progressively more action-based and "exciting. A bit more kapow and zappy." He comments on the cover depicting "a bit of a space-battle ... with the Dalek ship as it was attacking the prison, which is something that isn't really in the actual show, but I think that was to make it look a bit higher budget than it actually was."

This story was first released on DVD in the United Kingdom on 18 November 2002. Special features include commentary on all episodes by Peter Davison, Janet Fielding and Matthew Robinson, deleted scenes, trailer and a 5.1 digital surround sound mix. A short feature "Resurrection of the Daleks - On Location" was also included, directed by Paul Vanezis, which was recorded at Shad Thames in March 2002. It included interviews with Robinson and Saward, and the final on-screen interview conducted with John Nathan-Turner before his death in May of that year. It was re-released in 2003 as part of a limited run box set with The Dalek Invasion of Earth and Remembrance of the Daleks and in 2007 as part of a box set that contains Genesis of the Daleks, Destiny of the Daleks, Revelation of the Daleks and Remembrance of the Daleks.

This story was released as the accompanying DVD with Issue 34 of the Doctor Who DVD Files on 21 April 2010, released by GE FABBRI.

The story was re-released on DVD in 2011 as part of the Revisitations 2 box set (along with The Seeds of Death and Carnival of Monsters) in an expanded 2-disc set with the original as-broadcast 2x46 minutes version included on the first disc. New special features included a commentary on the episodes by Saward, Terry Molloy and visual effects designer Peter Wragg (moderated by Nicholas Pegg), a documentary called Casting Far and Wide in which Toby Hadoke interviewed other members of the cast, and a documentary about the era of the Fifth Doctor called Come in Number Five which was presented by David Tennant, the son-in-law of Peter Davison.

In March 2026, the series was upgraded and re-released on Blu-ray, in a box set that contained all seven stories from Season 21. New special effects were included in the latest upgrade, which also corrected a small error in the original 'flashback' sequence in episode 2. The new version includes the Doctor's companion Leela, who was omitted from the original broadcast version.
