= The Caves of Androzani =

135 – The Caves of Androzani
- Doctor Who serial
- The cliffhanger to "Part Three", in which the Doctor prepares to crash land onto Androzani Minor, has been named one of the greatest cliffhangers in the series's history.

Cast
- Doctor: Peter Davison – Fifth Doctor
- Companion: Nicola Bryant – Peri Brown
- Others: Christopher Gable – Sharaz Jek; John Normington – Morgus; Barbara Kinghorn – Timmin; David Neal – The President; Maurice Roëves – Stotz; Roy Holder – Krelper; Martin Cochrane – Chellak; Robert Glenister – Salateen; Ian Staples – Soldier; Colin Baker – Sixth Doctor; Anthony Ainley – The Master; Matthew Waterhouse – Adric; Sarah Sutton – Nyssa; Janet Fielding – Tegan Jovanka; Mark Strickson – Turlough; Gerald Flood – Voice of Kamelion

Production
- Directed by: Graeme Harper
- Written by: Robert Holmes
- Script editor: Eric Saward
- Produced by: John Nathan-Turner
- Music by: Roger Limb
- Production code: 6R
- Series: Season 21
- Running time: 4 episodes, 25 minutes each
- First broadcast: 8 March 1984
- Last broadcast: 16 March 1984

Chronology
← Preceded by Planet of Fire	Followed by → The Twin Dilemma

The Caves of Androzani is the sixth serial of the 21st season of the BBC science fiction television series Doctor Who, originally broadcast in four twice-weekly parts on BBC1 from 8 to 16 March 1984. Written by Robert Holmes and directed by Graeme Harper, it featured Peter Davison's last regular appearance as the Fifth Doctor and marked the first appearance of Colin Baker's Sixth Doctor.

In the serial, the Doctor (Davison) and his companion Peri (Nicola Bryant) become involved in a war for control of the life-prolonging substance "spectrox" on the planet Androzani Minor, which is being fought between the ruthless businessman Morgus (John Normington) and the android-builder Sharaz Jek (Christopher Gable).

The Caves of Androzani saw the return of prolific Doctor Who writer Robert Holmes to the series for the first time since 1978. It was also Graeme Harper's first directing work on the series, having worked on earlier serials as an assistant director. Harper's direction was praised by critics for its cinematic style which made use of single-camera filming and editing rather than the series's usual multi-camera setup. In 2009, The Caves of Androzani was voted by fans as the best Doctor Who story in history.

== Plot ==
The TARDIS lands on Androzani Minor, and the Doctor and Peri explore the caves where they are captured by General Chellak, who believes them to be aiding gunrunners. Androzani Minor is the only source of the spectrox drug, produced by bats within the desert planet's cave systems. The citizens of neighbouring Androzani Major rely on spectrox for its life-extending capabilities. Spectrox mining is controlled by Morgus's business conglomerate, but is threatened by Sharaz Jek, a masked figure who hides within the cave systems and controls an army of androids that disrupt mining efforts. Morgus has publicly funded the military operation led by Chellak to defeat Jek, but secretly employs gunrunners Stotz and Krelper to supply Jek with weapons to profit from the war. Chellak communicates the image of the Doctor and Peri to Morgus who does not recognise them and orders their execution. At their execution, Chellak finds that Jek replaced them with androids. Unbeknownst to Chellak, his own adjutant, Maj. Salateen, has also been replaced by one of Jek's androids.

In Jek's lair, the Doctor and Peri complain about illness, and the real Salateen tells them that they had stepped in raw spectrox, which is lethal; the anti-toxin is the milk of the queen bat, but due to the recent war, the bats have descended to the deepest levels of the mine that are devoid of oxygen. Jek explains that he is at war with Morgus as his actions led to his disfiguration. Jek leaves the two under guard of his androids while he meets Stotz and Krelper. The Doctor disables one of the androids to allow them to escape. They are caught by another of the androids, and Peri is captured by Chellak, while the Doctor is given by Jek to Stotz and Krelper.

Stotz decides to take the Doctor to see Morgus directly, and communicates with him holographically en route. Morgus sees the Doctor alive, and afraid of a conspiracy against him, kills the President of Androzani and makes his own arrangements to travel to Androzani Minor to set things right. The Doctor commandeers Stotz's ship and redirects it back to the surface of Androzani Minor, setting off to rescue Peri. Chellak initiates a major attack against Jek's androids, which ends up costing him his life as well as most of the soldiers and androids. During this, Jek rescues Peri as she starts to succumb to the spectrox poisoning. The Doctor, starting to also feel the effects, arrives at the base. Jek is overcome with guilt, and directs the Doctor to where he can find the queen bat and provides him with an oxygen tank. Morgus lands by Stotz's ship, and learns that his shrewd secretary has replaced him as head of the conglomerate. Morgus quickly enlists Stotz to get Jek's supply of spectrox. Stotz kills Krelper and the remaining gunrunner before leaving. They follow the heat signature from Jek's cooling system to find his base. Morgus, Stotz, and Jek get into a fight, and end up killing each other.

The Doctor finds the queen bat and collects two phials of her milk. Returning to the base, he collects Peri and wearily carries her out of the caves, dropping one of the two phials as he gets to the TARDIS. He sets the TARDIS in motion and feeds Peri the remaining phial, before collapsing on the floor. Peri recovers as the Doctor explains that there was only enough bat's milk left to cure her; though he is dying, he says his body might regenerate, though he notes it feels different from his previous regenerations. The Doctor begins to hallucinate images of his past companions urging him to continue to fight for his life. They include the dead Adric, which the Doctor queries before the Master yells that he must die and the regeneration completes, with the Sixth Doctor suddenly alert and active. When Peri asks what has happened, the Doctor replies, "Change, my dear, and it seems not a moment too soon".

== Production ==
=== Writing ===
The lead character of the BBC science fiction television series Doctor Who, an alien Time Lord known as the Doctor, is able to undergo a process known as "regeneration" when fatally injured, completely changing his appearance and personality while maintaining his memories. This has allowed multiple actors to headline the series as the Doctor. In 1981, Peter Davison was the fifth actor to assume the lead role. By the end of Davison's second season, he had to decide whether to stay beyond a third season. He followed advice given by his predecessor Patrick Troughton—whom he had chanced upon in a BBC car park shortly after taking the role—to only stay for three years. Davison was also envious of his contemporaries who were moving between different projects.

The working title of this story was Chain Reaction. This story was the first time former script editor Robert Holmes had written for the series since The Power of Kroll (1978), as series producer John Nathan-Turner had been keen to use writers new to the show instead.

=== Casting ===
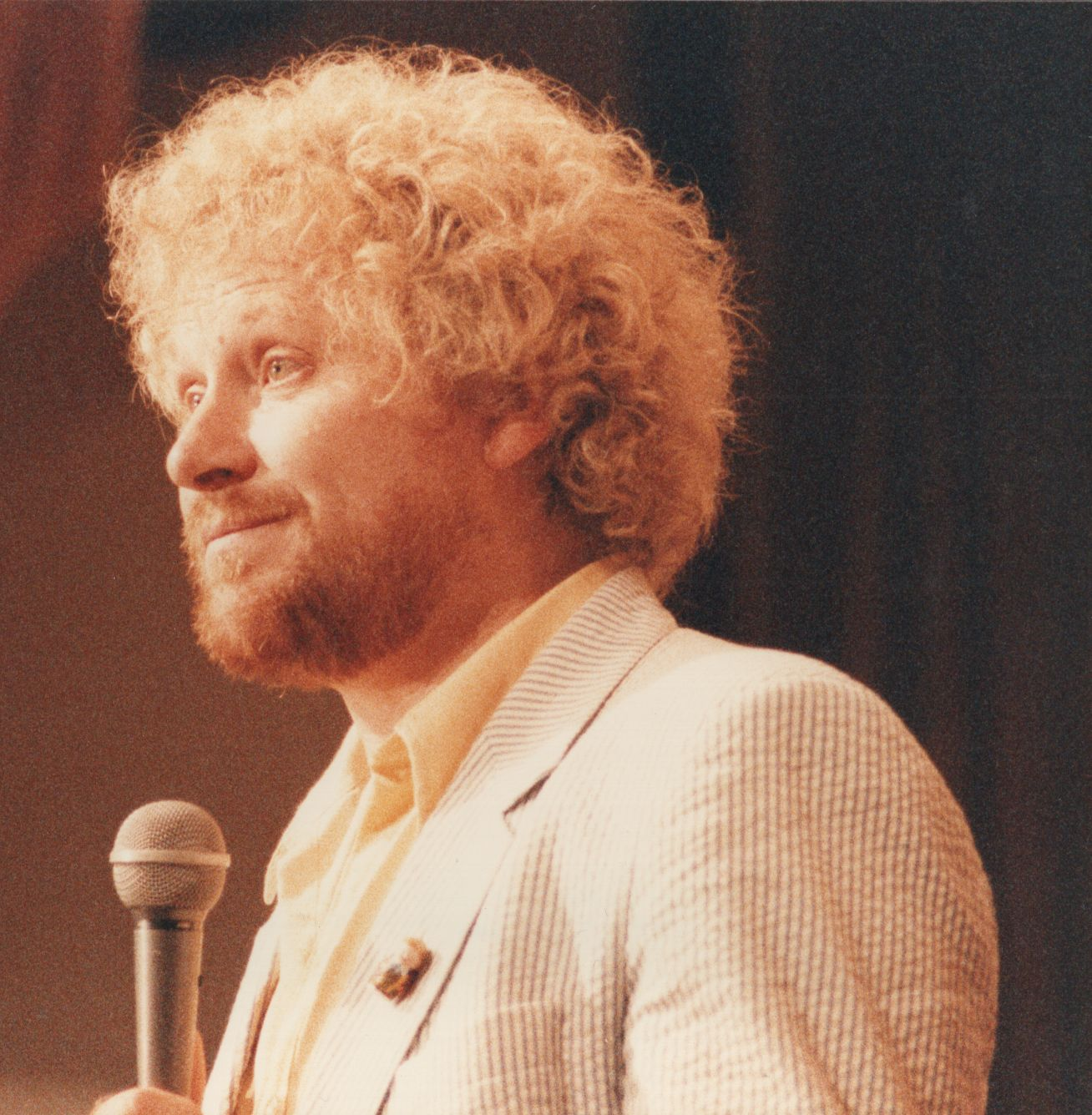
This serial marks the first appearance of Colin Baker as the Sixth Doctor.

Christopher Gable, who played Sharaz Jek, was a well-known actor and formerly a leading ballet dancer. Gable was not the only contender to play Jek; John Nathan-Turner, who always favoured attracting big stars to the series in guest roles, had offered the role to actor Tim Curry, as well as rock stars Mick Jagger and David Bowie. Bowie's management declined on his behalf as the dates clashed with his Serious Moonlight Tour according to Bowie biographer and Doctor Who staff member Nicholas Pegg. Ultimately, Christopher Gable was cast, Harper's preferred choice (Harper claimed on the DVD commentary that Bowie was the only other contender he thought of but he believed Gable ended up being right for it). Robert Glenister and Peter Davison had previously played brothers Brian and Steve Webber in the BBC sitcom Sink or Swim (1980–1982).

Glenister later played Aboresh in the audio play Absolution and Thomas Edison in "Nikola Tesla's Night of Terror". John Normington guest stars as Morgus; he returned to the series as Trevor Sigma in the Seventh Doctor story The Happiness Patrol (1988). He also appeared in "Ghost Machine" (2006), an episode of the Doctor Who spin-off Torchwood.

=== Recording ===
As John Normington misread a stage direction, his character Morgus breaks the fourth wall.

Recording was interrupted by a strike which caused a serious delay. As a result, two sequences had to be cut. The first scene would have featured the Doctor and Peri at the opening of the story in the TARDIS. The Doctor was to explain to Peri the reason for their visit to Androzani Minor. Apparently, as a boy, the Doctor had started a "blown glass bottle collection," which was made from the sand of different planets. He had lost his Androzani bottle and decided to return there to retrieve some more sand. It was in this scene Peri was to say "You're such a pain, Doctor." However, when the final cut of the serial was made, it had been discovered that certain lines of dialogue (like the Doctor professing that "I am not a pain." and Peri's comments about needing sand to "make some glass") alluded to the cut sequence. To rectify this, Davison and Bryant voiced over part of their conversation while the TARDIS materialises from outer space to the planet. The second scene to be cut would have featured the Doctor battling with the magma beast in episode four. Other Doctor Who stories adversely affected by the industrial actions of the late 1970s and the 1980s were Resurrection of the Daleks (1984), which was delayed by a year, and Shada (1980), which was not completed.

While he is in his office, the character of Morgus frequently breaks the fourth wall by talking directly to camera. This arose through actor John Normington misunderstanding a stage direction. Harper felt the asides effectively ramped up the dramatic tension, and decided to keep them. The Fifth Doctor's regeneration, like the Fourth Doctor's, features a flashback of that incarnation's companions. However, for this regeneration, it was decided that special recordings of the Davison-era companions would be used instead of stock footage. This required Matthew Waterhouse, Sarah Sutton, Janet Fielding, Mark Strickson, Gerald Flood and Anthony Ainley to return in cameos for the regeneration sequence. Fielding, Strickson, Flood and Ainley were already under contract to appear in the stories of Season 21. However, special contracts had to be made for Waterhouse, who left the series in Season 19, and Sutton, who left in Season 20. Johnny Byrne, who created the character of Nyssa (in his 1981 story The Keeper of Traken) had to be paid royalties for the use of the character in the regeneration scene.

Davison has joked on several occasions of how he was "upstaged" by Nicola Bryant (Peri) in his last major scene as the Doctor. Before the regeneration hallucination occurs, Davison is lying on the floor and his head is resting by Bryant, who is kneeling beside him. As he is delivering his last few lines, Bryant's loose fitting outfit prominently displays her cleavage. The closing title sequence for episode four featured the face of Sixth Doctor Colin Baker instead of Peter Davison, and credits Baker as the Doctor before Davison's own credit. This was the first and, to date, only time that the new lead received top billing in the final full story of an outgoing Doctor. The trousers which Colin Baker wore in the regeneration scene were modified to fit his larger frame. Davison later wore the same pair of trousers when he reprised the role of the Fifth Doctor in the mini-episode "Time Crash".

== Broadcast and reception ==
Episode	Title	Run time	Original release date	UK viewers (millions)
1	"Part One"	24:33	8 March 1984	6.9
2	"Part Two"	25:00	9 March 1984	6.6
3	"Part Three"	24:36	15 March 1984	7.8
4	"Part Four"	25:37	16 March 1984	7.8

The Caves of Androzani received critical acclaim. The serial was repeated on BBC2 in February/March 1993 on consecutive Fridays (19 February 1993 to 12 March 1993) at 7:15 pm, achieving viewing figures of 2.12, 1.9, 1.86 and 1.4 million respectively.

Peter Davison has named The Caves of Androzani as his favourite serial from his Doctor Who tenure, owing to Holmes's script and Harper's direction. He praised Harper for bringing "pace" and "energy", as well as for directing the programme "far more filmically than it had ever been done before." Davison stated in 2016 that if Androzani had been produced a year earlier, he may have stayed for a fourth season.

In 2003's 40th Anniversary Doctor Who Magazine poll, The Caves of Androzani was voted the best serial of all time. In Outpost Gallifrey's 40th Anniversary Poll, it was voted the second best serial of all time. In a 2009 Doctor Who Magazine poll, The Caves of Androzani was voted the greatest Doctor Who story by readers, and was the only Peter Davison story to feature in the top ten. In 2010, Charlie Jane Anders of io9 listed the cliffhanger to the third episode — in which the Doctor prepares to crash Stotz's ship — as one of the greatest cliffhangers in the history of Doctor Who, going as far as calling it "the greatest Doctor Who cliffhanger of them all". In 2013, Den of Geek's Andrew Blair selected The Caves of Androzani as one of the ten Doctor Who stories that would make great musicals. In a 2014 poll, Doctor Who Magazine's readers ranked the story as the fourth best of all time. In 2016, Davison named Androzani as his favourite serial from his time on the show, owing to Holmes's script and Harper's direction.

== Commercial releases ==
=== In print ===
The Caves of Androzani
- Author: Terrance Dicks
- Cover artist: Andrew Skilleter
- Series: Doctor Who book: Target novelisations
- Release number: 92
- Publisher: Target Books
- Publication date: 14 February 1985
- ISBN: 0-426-19959-6

A novelisation of this serial, written by Terrance Dicks, was published by Target Books in November 1984.

=== Home media ===
To prepare the serial for VHS release, the BBC submitted The Caves of Androzani to the British Board of Film Classification (BBFC) in September 1991. It was one of several mid-1980s stories to be given a PG rating, rather than the broader U desired by the BBC at this time, with the BBFC named six relatively strong scenes that were "enough to tip the tape into 'PG.'" The Board described the rating as "merely cautionary. Those who are fans will watch regardless."

The Caves of Androzani was released on VHS in the United Kingdom in February 1992 (along with Tom Baker’s debut story ‘Robot’) and on DVD on 18 June 2001. The DVD contains commentary by director Graeme Harper and actors Peter Davison and Nicola Bryant. This story was released as the accompanying DVD with issue 36 of The Doctor Who DVD Files on 19 May 2010. The story was re-released on DVD on 4 October 2010 in a boxset titled Revisitations 1 along with re-releases of The Movie and The Talons of Weng-Chiang. The story was released on Blu-ray as part of the box set Doctor Who: The Collection – Season 21 on 16 March 2026.

=== Soundtrack release ===
Doctor Who: The Caves of Androzani

Soundtrack album by Roger Limb and the BBC Radiophonic Workshop
- Released: 25 March 2013
- Genre: Soundtrack
- Label: Silva Screen

BBC Radiophonic Workshop chronology
BBC Radiophonic Workshop – A Retrospective (2008)	Doctor Who: The Caves of Androzani (2013)	Doctor Who: The Krotons (2013)

Doctor Who soundtrack chronology
Series 6 (2011)	The Caves of Androzani (2013)	The Krotons (2013)

The original music soundtrack to this serial by Roger Limb and the BBC Radiophonic Workshop was released by Silva Screen Records on 25 March 2013, and reissued in a 2-LP set on translucent purple vinyl on 25 November 2013.

==== Track listing ====
All tracks are written by Roger Limb, except where noted.

No.	Title	Length
1.	"Doctor Who (Opening Theme)" (Ron Grainer arr. Peter Howell)
2.	"Androzani Minor"
3.	"Gun-Runners"
4.	"Morgus And Chellak"
5.	"Death Sentence"
6.	"Sharaz Jek"
7.	"Death Under The Red Cloth"
8.	"Androids"
9.	"Next Time It'll Be For Real"
10.	"Nobody Lives For Ever"
11.	"Spectrox"
12.	"Salateen"
13.	"Exile"
14.	"Clever Little Android"
15.	"Two Kilos, What A Deal"
16.	"The Magma Beast"
17.	"Blind Fools"
18.	"Tear His Arms Out"
19.	"Stage Three"
20.	"Geostationary Orbit"
21.	"The Girl Will Be Alone"
22.	"Peri Abducted"
23.	"Vertical Descent Pattern"
24.	"It Could Have Been Worse"
25.	"Do You Think I'm Mad?"
26.	"The Doctor Pursued"
27.	"Mud Burst"
28.	"Morgus And Stotz"
29.	"Face Off"
30.	"Morgus Kaput"
31.	"Not Beaten Yet"
32.	"Milk Of The Queen Bat"
33.	"Return To The TARDIS"
34.	"Is This Death?"
35.	"Doctor Who (Closing Theme)" (Ron Grainer arr. Peter Howell)
