= Planet of Fire =

134 – Planet of Fire
- Doctor Who serial

Cast
- Doctor: Peter Davison – Fifth Doctor
- Companions: Mark Strickson – Vislor Turlough; Nicola Bryant – Peri Brown; Gerald Flood – Kamelion
- Others: Anthony Ainley – The Master; Dallas Adams – Howard; Michael Bangerter – Curt; Peter Wyngarde – Timanov; Barbara Shelley – Sorasta; James Bate – Amyand; Jonathan Caplan – Roskal; Edward Highmore – Malkon; Max Arthur – Zuko; John Alkin – Lomand (Note: Also provided the distorted Trion voice, uncredited.); Simon Sutton – Lookout

Production
- Directed by: Fiona Cumming
- Written by: Peter Grimwade
- Script editor: Eric Saward
- Produced by: John Nathan-Turner
- Music by: Peter Howell
- Production code: 6Q
- Series: Season 21
- Running time: 4 episodes, 25 minutes each
- First broadcast: 23 February 1984
- Last broadcast: 2 March 1984

Chronology
← Preceded by Resurrection of the Daleks	Followed by → The Caves of Androzani

Planet of Fire is the fifth serial of the 21st season in the British science fiction television series Doctor Who, which was first broadcast in four twice-weekly parts on BBC1 from 23 February to 2 March 1984.

In the serial, the Doctor's old enemy, the Master, plots to use the volcanic gases on the planet Sarn to renew his body after accidentally shrinking himself in an experiment.

Peter Davison's penultimate serial as the Doctor, it marks the departures of both Mark Strickson as Vislor Turlough and Gerald Flood as Kamelion, and introduces Nicola Bryant as Peri Brown.

== Plot ==
The Fifth Doctor and Turlough land on Earth on Lanzarote where Turlough takes Peri Brown on board the TARDIS to save her from drowning. They travel to the planet Sarn, where the natives worship the local volcano as a god. It is revealed that Sarn is a long abandoned Trion colony planet. Turlough, a Trion, suspects some of his family were sent here after a revolution against the hereditary leading clans of his homeworld. Turlough realises the Chosen One, Malkon, may be his brother.

The android Kamelion has meanwhile made mental contact with its old controller, the Master. Kamelion, controlled by the Master, convinces the natives that he is the Outsider, a promised prophet. He seizes Peri and uses her to transport a black box into the control room of his TARDIS. It contains a miniaturised Master, who has been transformed by a disastrous experiment with his Tissue Compression Eliminator weapon. The Master re-established the psychic link with Kamelion and has manoeuvred him to Sarn so that he can take advantage of the restorative powers of the numismaton gas within the fire mountain.

Turlough realises the imminent volcanic bursts will destroy Sarn, so he uses a communication unit to get in touch with Trion and plead for a rescue ship to evacuate the planet. Acting on a message from the Doctor, Turlough programs the TARDIS to rescue the Doctor and Peri. He finds out that a general amnesty has been issued and he is free to return home.

The Doctor succeeds in weakening the Master's hold over Kamelion and interrupts the numismaton experiment. He is unable to prevent the Master from reacquiring his usual size. As the gas flow alters, the Master is trapped and the Doctor watches as he is seemingly immolated. Implored by the terminally wounded Kamelion, the Doctor has put the automaton out of its misery. Escaping the destruction of the gas control room in the TARDIS along with Peri, the Doctor lands to pick up Turlough, only to find that he has elected to return to Trion. Turlough tells Peri to look after the Doctor. He then parts from the Doctor, thanking him for all that he has learned in his travels with him. As the Doctor and Peri return to the TARDIS, she says she has a few months' vacation left and would like to spend it travelling with him. The Doctor accepts and they depart.

== Production ==
=== Costumes ===
It was decided that because of the climate of Lanzarote, where the serial was filmed, the cast would have to alter their usual costumes. Although Peter Davison started the story wearing his cricketer outfit, for the rest of the story, he removed his jumper to reveal his question mark braces and wore a beige floral waistcoat. Strickson shed his usual school uniform in favour of a blue pin-stripe shirt and light gray shorts with a pair of swimming briefs underneath. Nicola Bryant also wore a pink bikini beneath her clothes to which she stripped down for a couple of scenes.

=== Cast notes ===
Mark Strickson has also reprised the role of Turlough in the audio plays by Big Finish Productions and penned the introduction to the spin-off novel Turlough and the Earthlink Dilemma (1986). Promotional photographs taken during production include a shot of Peter Davison wearing a tuxedo and holding a gun, with Nicola Bryant standing next to him in a bikini, in the style of James Bond.

== Broadcast and reception ==
Episode	Title	Run time	Original release date	UK viewers (millions)
1	"Part One"	24:26	23 February 1984	7.4
2	"Part Two"	24:20	24 February 1984	6.1
3	"Part Three"	23:57	1 March 1984	7.4
4	"Part Four"	24:44	2 March 1984	7.0

Writing for Radio Times, Patrick Mulkern gave the serial three stars out of five and observed that writer Peter Grimwade "laces his script with homosexual subtext", noting in particular the "male eye candy on display", arguing that "old sage Timanov’s mentoring of callow youth Malkon has a hint of pederasty" and also commenting on the "unmistakably phallic object" hauled from the seabed and fondled by Howard, Curt and Peri. Paul Cornell, Martin Day and Keith Topping, authors of The Discontinuity Guide, thought that new companion Peri made a good impression, helped by some decent lines. They said "As a whole the story is less than the sum of its parts: not a great deal happens, but it is competently written, and the location filming is excellent."

The serial was positively reviewed by Arnold T Blumberg of IGN, who said it had "a lot to recommend" with "beautiful location work" and effective sets. Blumberg praised Anthony Ainley as "far more menacing" as the Master than he had been previously, and described Peter Wyngarde as an "excellent choice" for the role of a religious leader.

== Commercial releases ==
=== In print ===
Planet of Fire
- Author: Peter Grimwade
- Cover artist: Andrew Skilleter
- Series: Doctor Who book: Target novelisations
- Release number: 93
- Publisher: Target Books
- Publication date: 14 February 1985
- ISBN: 0-426-19940-5

A novelisation of this serial, written by Peter Grimwade, was published by Target Books in October 1984.

=== Home media ===
Planet of Fire was released on VHS in September 1998. The DVD was released in June 2010 as part of the box set Kamelion Tales along with The King's Demons, with a commentary by Peter Davison, Nicola Bryant, Mark Strickson and Fiona Cumming.
