= Spyder's Web =

1972 British television drama series

- Starring: Patricia Cutts; Anthony Ainley; Veronica Carlson; Roger Lloyd-Pack; Peter Sallis
- Country of origin: United Kingdom
- Original language: English
- No. of series: 1
- No. of episodes: 13

Production
- Running time: 50 minutes
- Production company: ATV

Original release
- Network: ITV
- Release: 21 January – 14 April 1972

Spyder's Web is a British crime drama television series produced by ATV for ITV and broadcast in 1972. It starred Anthony Ainley as Clive Hawksworth and Patricia Cutts as Charlotte "Lottie" Dean as two secret agents working for the mysterious Spyder organisation in the interests of the British government.

== Overview ==
In common with many other such series of the time, Spyder's Web adopted an ironic approach to its subject matter. The Spyder organisation used as its cover a down-at-heel film company, Arachnid Films, and only Dean and Hawksworth were in on the secret; the company's other employees, Wallis Ackroyd and Albert Mason, believed the cover to be genuine. Indeed, Dean claimed to have won awards for her documentaries. Hawksworth, the "action man", was a knowing caricature of the steely-eyed, jutting-jawed heroes of former times, and was alleged to have been "steeped in Bulldog Drummond from an early age". (His response: "We were just good friends.") Five of the thirteen episodes were written by Roy Clarke, who created and wrote Last of the Summer Wine. The programme ran for just one series.

== Home media ==
The series was released on DVD by Network in 2011. Eleven of the episodes do not survive in colour: only episodes seven and nine of the release were presented as colour episodes.

== Cast ==
- Patricia Cutts as Lottie Dean
- Veronica Carlson as Wallis Ackroyd
- Anthony Ainley as Clive Hawksworth
- Roger Lloyd-Pack as Albert Mason
- Peter Sallis as Grovnik
- Henri Szeps as Policeman

== Episodes ==
#	Title	Writer	Director	First broadcast
1	"Spyder Secures a Main Strand"	Roy Clarke	Dennis Vance	21 January 1972
2	"The Executioners"	Alfred Shaughnessy	James Gatward	28 January 1972
3	"Romance on Wheels"	Roy Clarke	James Gatward	4 February 1972
4	"The Hafiz Affair"	Roy Clarke	Dorothy Denham	11 February 1972
5	"Life at a Price"	Frank Driscoll	Dennis Vance	18 February 1972
6	"Emergency Exit"	David Ellis	David Wickes	25 February 1972
7	"Red Admiral"	Alan Hackney	John Cooper	3 March 1972
8	"Lies and Dolls"	Alfred Shaughnessy	Dennis Vance	10 March 1972
9	"Things That Go Bang in the Night"	Marc Brandel	Ian Fordyce	17 March 1972
10	"An Almost Modern Man"	Roy Clarke	Dennis Vance	24 March 1972
11	"Nobody's Strawberry Fool"	Robert Holmes	John Cooper	31 March 1972
12	"The Prevalence of Skeletons"	Marc Brandel	Ian Fordyce	7 April 1972
13	"Rev Counter"	Roy Clarke	Dorothy Denham	14 April 1972
