= Logopolis =

115 – Logopolis
- Doctor Who serial

Cast
- Doctor: Tom Baker – Fourth Doctor
- Companions: Matthew Waterhouse – Adric; Sarah Sutton – Nyssa; Janet Fielding – Tegan Jovanka
- Others: Anthony Ainley – The Master; Delore Whiteman – Aunt Vanessa; John Fraser – The Monitor; Tom Georgeson – Detective Inspector; Christopher Hurst – Security Guard; Peter Davison – Fifth Doctor

Production
- Directed by: Peter Grimwade
- Written by: Christopher H. Bidmead
- Script editor: Christopher H. Bidmead
- Produced by: John Nathan-Turner
- Executive producer: Barry Letts
- Music by: Paddy Kingsland
- Production code: 5V
- Series: Season 18
- Running time: 4 episodes, 25 minutes each
- First broadcast: 28 February 1981
- Last broadcast: 21 March 1981

Chronology
← Preceded by The Keeper of Traken	Followed by → Castrovalva

Logopolis is the seventh and final serial of the 18th season of the British science fiction television series Doctor Who, which was first broadcast in four weekly parts on BBC1 from 28 February to 21 March 1981.

The serial is set on the planets Earth and Logopolis. In the serial, the Doctor, a time traveller from the planet Gallifrey, forms a temporary truce with his arch-enemy the Master (Anthony Ainley) to stop the unravelling of the universe which the Master had started by accident.

Logopolis is Tom Baker's last story as the Fourth Doctor, and marks the first appearances of Peter Davison as the Fifth Doctor and Janet Fielding as new companion Tegan Jovanka.

The serial received positive reviews with many calling it a worthy farewell to Tom Baker as the Fourth Doctor. Baker's performance received much praise from critics.

== Plot ==
The Fourth Doctor, with Adric, materialises the TARDIS around a police box to give its dimensions to the mathematicians of the planet Logopolis to repair its chameleon circuit. The Master attempts to trap the Doctor, who breaks his TARDIS out of the recursion loop. A figure in white, often referred to as "the Watcher", tells him to go to Logopolis immediately. Also aboard is Tegan Jovanka, who entered seeking help for her broken-down car.

At Logopolis, the Master has arrived first, hypnotised Nyssa, and murdered several mathematicians with his tissue-compression eliminator, which shrinks its victims to doll size. The Master uses a device to silence the mathematicians' vocal calculations and demands the Monitor explain a radio telescope on the planet. The planet starts turning to dust. The Monitor explains that their calculations power Charged Vacuum Emboitments (CVEs) which remove entropy from this universe, preventing its impending heat death. The Monitor urges the Doctor to create a CVE, before he disintegrates. The Doctor and Master agree to work together and bring Tegan with them to Earth in the Master's TARDIS. Adric and Nyssa watch entropy obliterate Nyssa's home planet, Traken. They follow in the doctor's Tardis.

The Fourth Doctor regenerates into the Fifth Doctor.

The Doctor and Master use the Pharos Project radio telescope – from which the Logopolitans modelled theirs – to send the program, while the Doctor's companions waylay the guards. The Master holds the Doctor hostage with his tissue-compression eliminator and threatens to close the CVE, blackmailing the universe to submit to him. The Doctor escapes onto the telescope gantry to disconnect the power cable, but the Master tilts the dish downwards. Hanging on to the cable, the Doctor tears it out, deactivating the dish and dropping him hundreds of feet to the ground. The Master escapes in his TARDIS.

Adric, Nyssa, and Tegan gather around the mortally-injured Doctor, who has visions of his past companions and enemies. His companions see the Watcher appear, and the Doctor explains that "It's the end... but the moment has been prepared for." The Watcher touches and merges with the Doctor, causing him to regenerate into the Fifth Doctor.

== Production ==
=== Casting ===
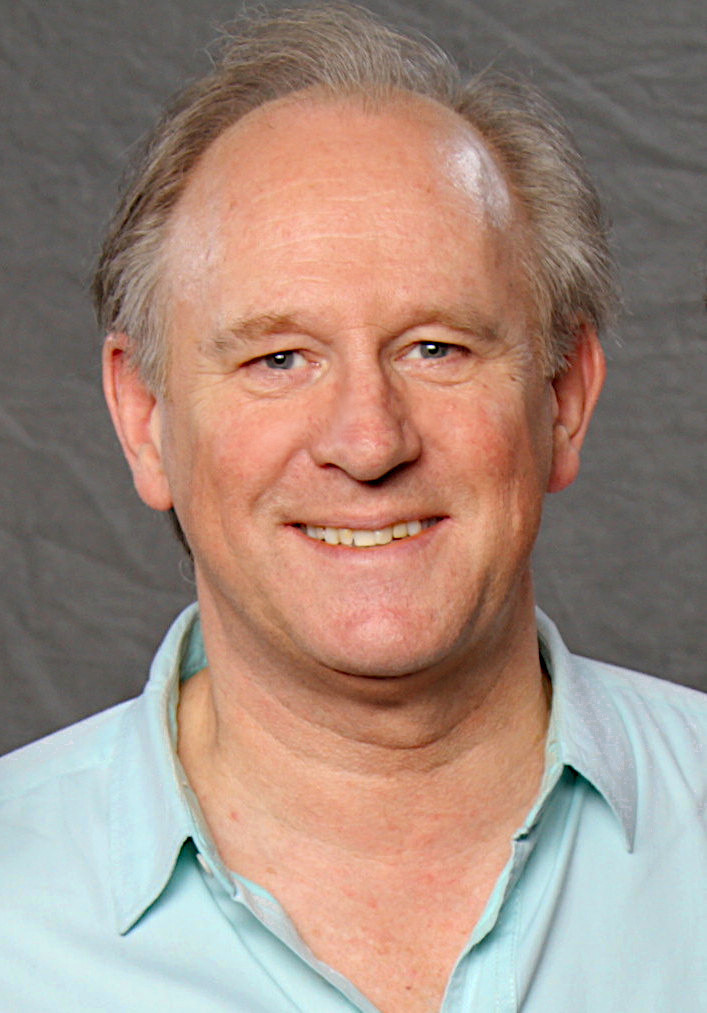
Peter Davison (The Doctor)

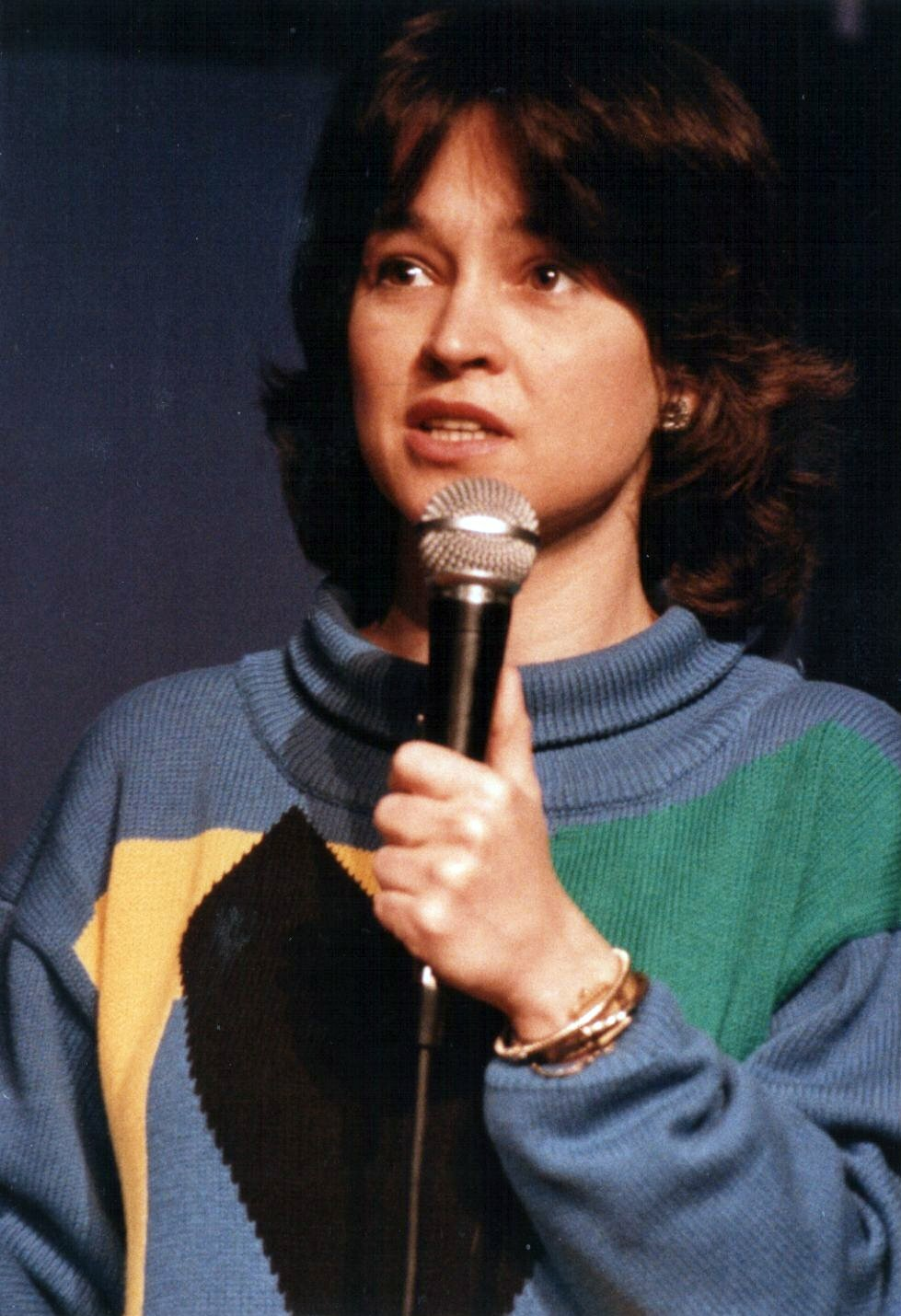
Janet Fielding (Tegan Jovanka)

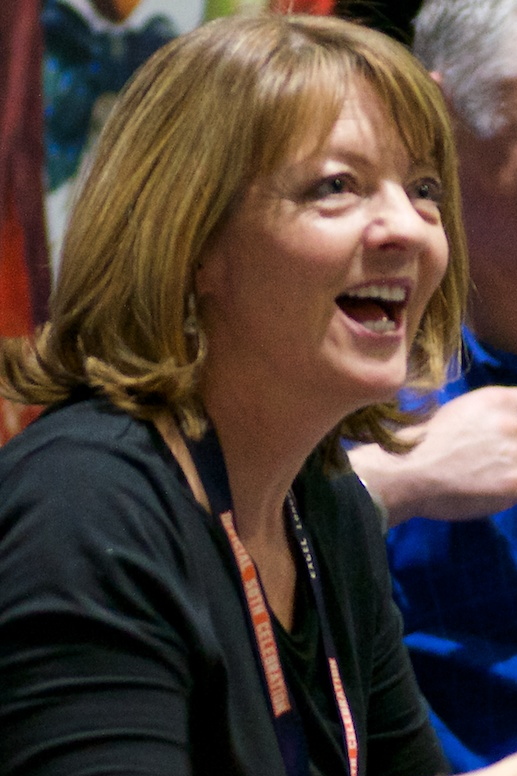
Sarah Sutton (Nyssa)

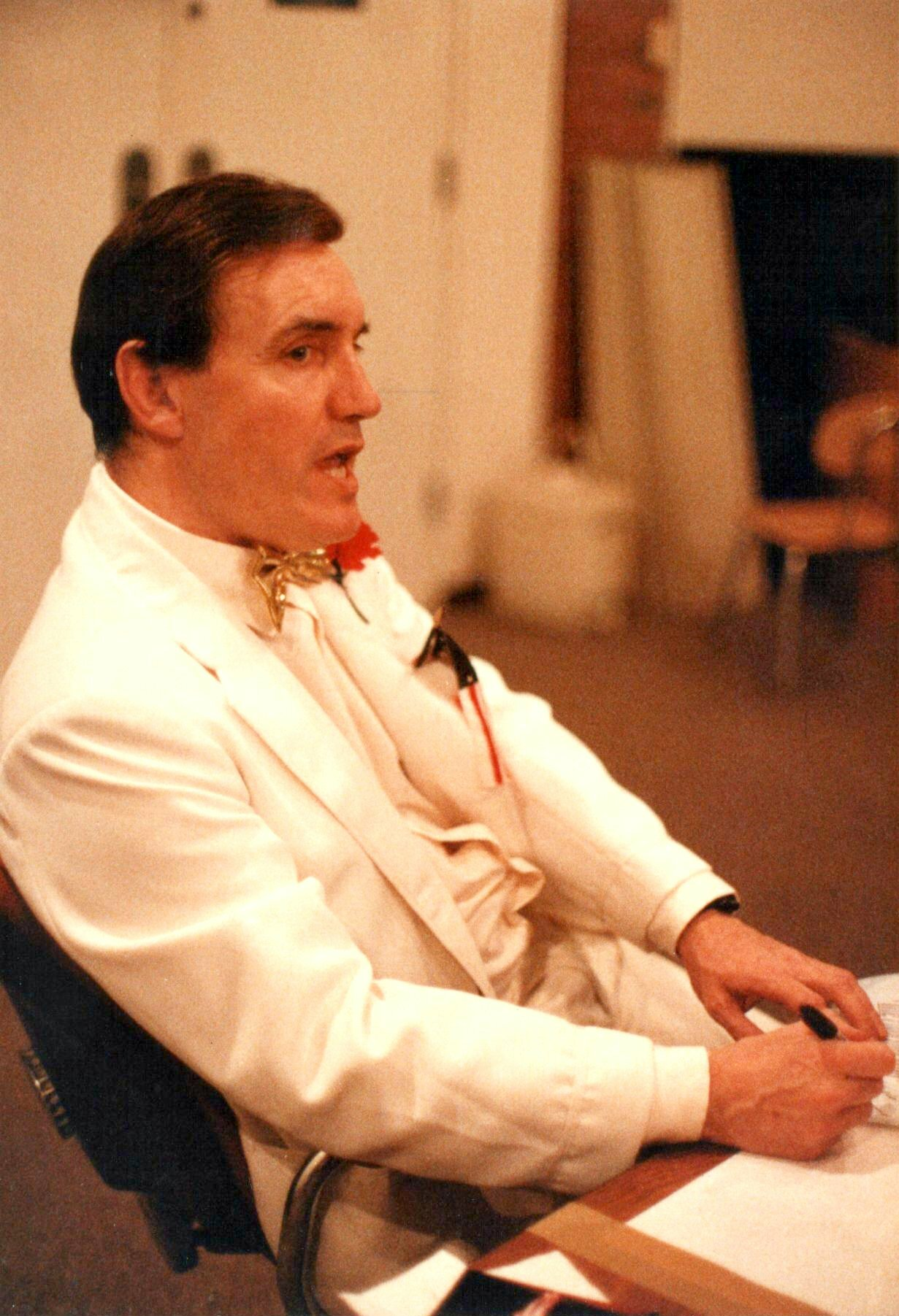
Anthony Ainley (The Master)

Actors who joined the regular cast of Doctor Who in Logopolis

The serial introduces Janet Fielding in the role of Australian trainee flight attendant Tegan Jovanka. Nathan-Turner conceived the role in collaboration with Bidmead, with the intention of introducing a younger female character who would display a superficial self-assurance masking inner vulnerability, without returning to the stereotype of screaming female companions of earlier serials. Brisbane-born Fielding had lost some of her native Australian accent since emigrating to the UK in 1977, but revived her accent to audition successfully for the part. Nathan-Turner initially wished to reintroduce a former companion to provide continuity for viewers following Baker's regeneration, but created Tegan when Elisabeth Sladen (Sarah Jane Smith) and Louise Jameson (Leela) both declined to return for the duration of season 19.

Two cast members returned from the previous serial, The Keeper of Traken: Sarah Sutton reprised her role as Nyssa, joining the TARDIS crew as a companion; and Anthony Ainley had his first full exposure in the role of the Master, a part he would continue to play for eight years. Outwardly, Ainley's beard and dark costume suggested close continuity with Roger Delgado's portrayal in the early 1970s, but Ainley imbued his part with a greater focus on revenge and blackmail.

The part of the mysterious Watcher was played by Adrian Gibbs; his part was left uncredited in order to foster a belief among fans that Peter Davison had played the role wrapped in white fabric. In fact, Davison's only appearance was during the final seconds of Part Four as the newly regenerated Doctor, for which he attracted a full actor's fee.

=== Filming ===
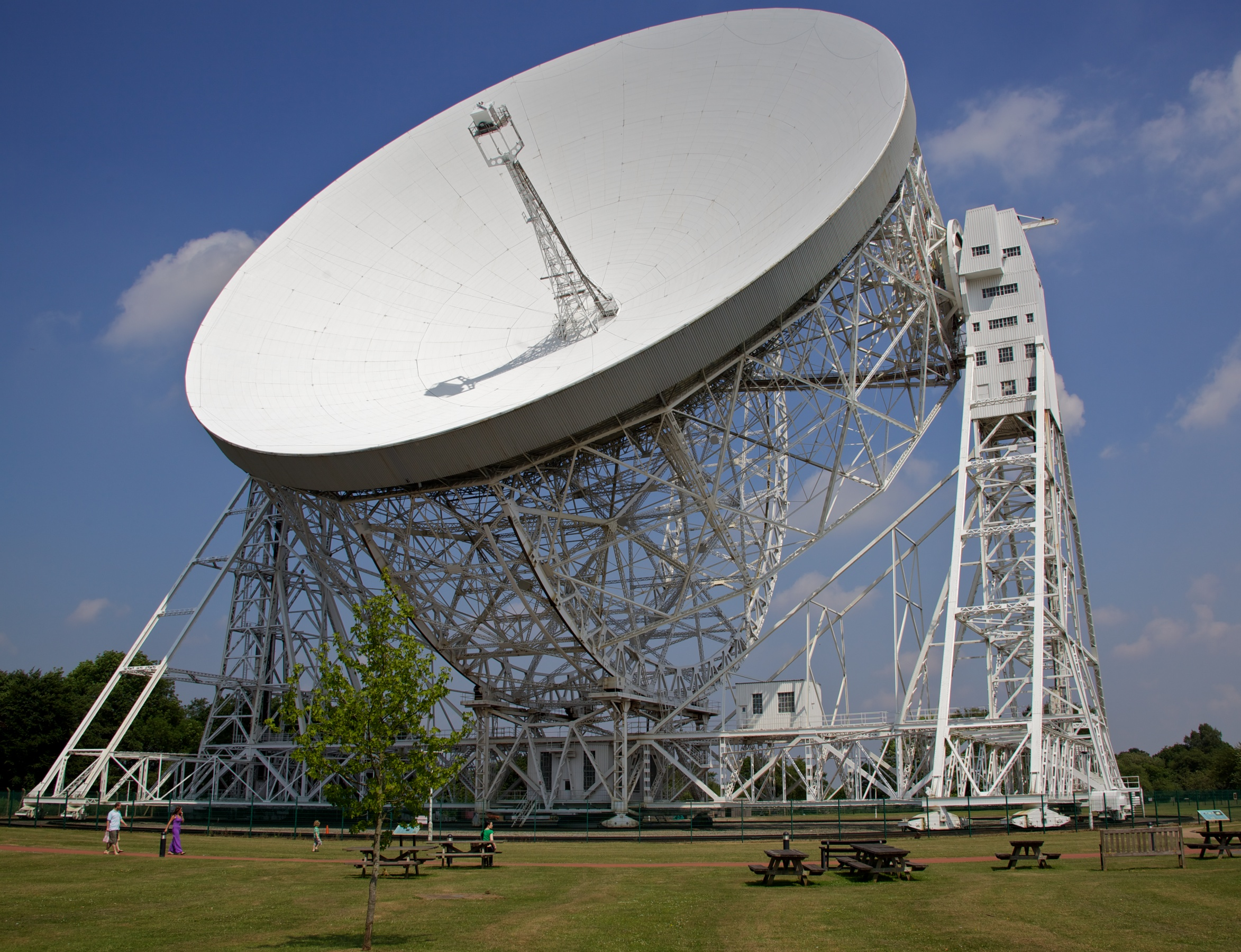
The BBC was unable to film on location at Jodrell Bank, and a scale model was used instead. Drone shots of the telescope were included in the 2019 Blu-Ray DVD release

For the outdoor scenes in Part One, in which Doctor materialises the TARDIS next to an actual police box on Earth, the production team had initially planned to film on location in a layby on the Barnet Bypass, in the outskirts of North London. By the 1980s, police boxes had been obsolete for many years, but one of the last surviving boxes in Britain was still standing here, and it was intended to film the TARDIS prop standing next to the real police box. However, shortly before filming was due to take place, the production team discovered that the Barnet police box had been vandalised and subsequently demolished. Filming was re-located to a layby on the southbound side of the A413 Amersham Road near Denham, Buckinghamshire. An older TARDIS prop which had last been used in season 17 was brought out of storage and assembled on location to stand in for the real police box. Today, the M25 bridges the road where the scene was filmed.

It had originally been intended to film the outdoor Pharos Project scenes in Part Four on location at the Jodrell Bank Lovell Telescope in Cheshire, but this was precluded by budgetary constraints. Instead the exterior scenes were filmed at the BBC's receiving station in Crowsley Park, and miniature effect shots were created using a scale model of a radio telescope. The scenes in the structure of the telescope were shot on lighting gantry in the Top of the Pops studio at Television Centre, London.

Incidental music in the serial was composed by Paddy Kingsland, and includes leitmotifs for Logopolis and the Watcher. In Part Four, an excerpt from Symphony No. 8 by Franz Schubert is heard playing on the technician's headphones in the Pharos Project control room.

=== Titles ===
The closing titles sequence was recompiled with Tom Baker's face removed from the closing credits of Episode 4. The same opening and end title sequence and arrangement of the theme music was used for the following story, Castrovalva, and next three seasons, but was altered to include Peter Davison's face. Episode 4 of this story was the last time, for the next 24 years, the lead character was listed in the credits as "Doctor Who" (thus making it the only time Peter Davison was credited as "Doctor Who"). Beginning with the next story, Castrovalva, until the series's cancellation in 1989, the character was credited simply as "The Doctor". The 1996 television film did not have an on-screen credit for the Eighth Doctor, but listed the Seventh as the "Old Doctor". The 2005 relaunch returned the credit to "Doctor Who", and then again to "The Doctor" in "The Christmas Invasion" (at the request of David Tennant). Also, Episode 4 was the first to credit two actors as "Doctor Who" or "The Doctor" when a regeneration scene was involved. It also happened at the end of Episode 4 of The Caves of Androzani (1984). In both instances, Peter Davison was billed second.

=== Outside references ===
According to Christopher Bidmead, the Logopolitans employ a hexadecimal, or base-16, numerical system, a real system commonly used in computer programming. When Adric and the Monitor read strings of numbers and letters, the letters are actually the numbers between 10 and 15, expressed as single digits.

== Broadcast and reception ==
Episode	Title	Run time	Original release date	UK viewers (millions)
1	"Part One"	24:32	28 February 1981	7.1
2	"Part Two"	24:03	7 March 1981	7.7
3	"Part Three"	24:32	14 March 1981	5.8
4	"Part Four"	25:10	21 March 1981	6.1

Logopolis was repeated on BBC2 in November/December 1981, as part of "The Five Faces of Doctor Who". Stripped across four consecutive evenings from Monday to Thursday 9–12 November 1981, with viewing figures of 5.5, 5.0, 6.0 and 5.4 million respectively.

The serial was the last Doctor Who story aired on its traditional Saturday evening slot for four years. When Peter Davison took over as the Fifth Doctor in January 1982, the BBC moved Doctor Who from Saturday nights to a new weekday prime time slot, airing two episodes per week. It did not return to Saturday evenings until January 1985.

=== Critical response ===
Paul Cornell, Martin Day, and Keith Topping wrote of the serial in The Discontinuity Guide (1995), deeming it "a magnificent farewell." In 2011, Patrick Mulkern of Radio Times awarded the serial four stars out of five. Much praise was given to Baker's performance, writing, "He's brooding, sparky and never for a second looks ready to give up." In The Greatest Show in the Galaxy: The Discerning Fan's Guide to Doctor Who, Marc Schuster and Tom Powers deemed the episode "melancholy yet fascinating." In Doctor Who: The Episode Guide, Marc Campbell awarded the serial a 10 out of 10, praising it for "its weighty subject matter and the enormous scale of its threat." Conversely, Andrew Blair of Den of Geek felt the serial lacked pathos and regarded it as "a missed opportunity." Charlie Jane Anders called it "A moody, dark saga about computational engineering, that never quite gels as a story and has a nonsensical ending."

== Commercial releases ==
=== In print ===
Logopolis
- Author: Christopher H. Bidmead
- Cover artist: Andrew Skilleter
- Series: Doctor Who book: Target novelisations
- Release number: 41
- Publisher: Target Books
- Publication date: 21 October 1982
- ISBN: 0-426-20149-3

A novelisation of this serial, written by Christopher H. Bidmead, was published by WH Allen (hardback) and Target Books (paperback) in October 1982. An unabridged reading of the novelisation read by Bidmead was released by BBC Audiobooks in February 2010, with a completely new cover.

=== Home media ===
The story was released on VHS in February 1992. In January 2007, the serial was released on DVD as part of a trilogy, entitled New Beginnings, alongside The Keeper of Traken and Castrovalva. Logopolis was also released as part of the Doctor Who DVD Files (issue 46) in October 2010. On 18 March 2019, Season 18 was re-released on Blu-ray, and given a new CGI option, including newly filmed shots filmed on location at Lovell Telescope.

=== Theatrical release ===
Fathom Events, in conjunction with the BBC, broadcast Logopolis to select cinemas in the United States on 13 March 2019, ahead of the planned Blu-ray release of Season 18 on 19 March 2019. The broadcast included additional interview footage with Baker, Fielding, and Sutton.

=== Music ===
Paddy Kingsland's incidental music for the closing regeneration scene of Part Four was included in the 2013 soundtrack album Doctor Who: The 50th Anniversary Collection (Silva Screen Records SILCD1450), under the title "It's The End…".
