= Eric Pringle =

British writer (1935–2017)

- Born: Eric Gray Pringle; 5 April 1935; Morpeth, Northumberland, England
- Died: 13 April 2017 (aged 82); Ledbury, Herefordshire, England
- Occupation: Writer
- Spouse(s): Patricia Ann Baker (m. 1959; died 2004) Jenny Barr (m. 2011)

Eric Pringle (5 April 1935 – 13 April 2017) was a British writer for radio and television. He also wrote three novels for children.

He was one of the writers of the 1972 television series Pretenders and of the 1974 series The Carnforth Practice.

== Early life ==
Educated at Morpeth Grammar School, Pringle went on to study at the University of Nottingham, graduating with an honours degree in English in 1957. His career took him to Gloucester and Bristol but a love of mountains lured Pringle to Kent Dene in Bowston, near Kendal. There, he worked for Kendal Provincial Insurance, working and editing the staff newspaper but soon became established as a writer of radio drama and television scripts.

== Career ==
In 1975, he was commissioned by then-Doctor Who script editor Robert Holmes to pen a two-part serial entitled The Angurth for the programme's thirteenth season. This was eventually abandoned, but in 1981, Pringle was encouraged by his agent, former Who producer Peter Bryant, to submit new material for the show. Pringle delivered two proposals for four-part stories to the production office in August, one called The Darkness (possibly featuring the Daleks) and another entitled War Game. Script editor Eric Saward finally responded to Pringle, and in 1982, Pringle was asked to put together a scene breakdown for War Game.

By 1983, War Game had been rechristened The Awakening (and may also have been called Poltergeist at some point). Saward and producer John Nathan-Turner had also come to the realisation that the story did not merit four episodes, and so Pringle was asked to condense it down to fit the two-part slot for Season Twenty-One. Pringle concurred and performed the necessary rewrites by April. Saward was still not satisfied with Pringle's modifications; consequently, he elected to heavily rewrite The Awakening. Pringle was not particularly pleased with Saward's rewrites, believing they made the story confusing and rushed. The Awakening was his only contribution to Doctor Who.

Much of Pringle's more recent work has been for BBC Radio 4 including adaptations of The Wolves of Willoughby Chase and J. B. Priestley's The Good Companions. His 1993 play Meeting Bea about the later life of Beatrix Potter was subsequently turned into a theatre play, premiering later that year at the Redgrave Theatre, Farnham, initially as The Secret of Beatrix Potter. His 2001 play Hymus Paradisi about the life of composer Herbert Howells won a Sony Award, presented to him by George Martin. That year also saw the publication of his children's novel Big George. This has been followed by two sequels, Big George and the Seventh Knight and Big George and the Winter King. The latter was adapted by the author as a musical performed by the Malvern Theatre Players in 2007. The Big George books are a retelling of the Saint George and the Dragon myth with a science fiction twist.

== Personal life ==
While working for Provincial Insurance, Pringle had to write in his spare time before being able to become a full-time writer around 1989.

After living in the Lake District for almost 30 years, Pringle relocated to Ledbury, Herefordshire in 1999. Later in life, he successfully battled oral cancer. He died of lung congestion in 2017.
