= Anthony Ainley =

British actor (1932–2004)

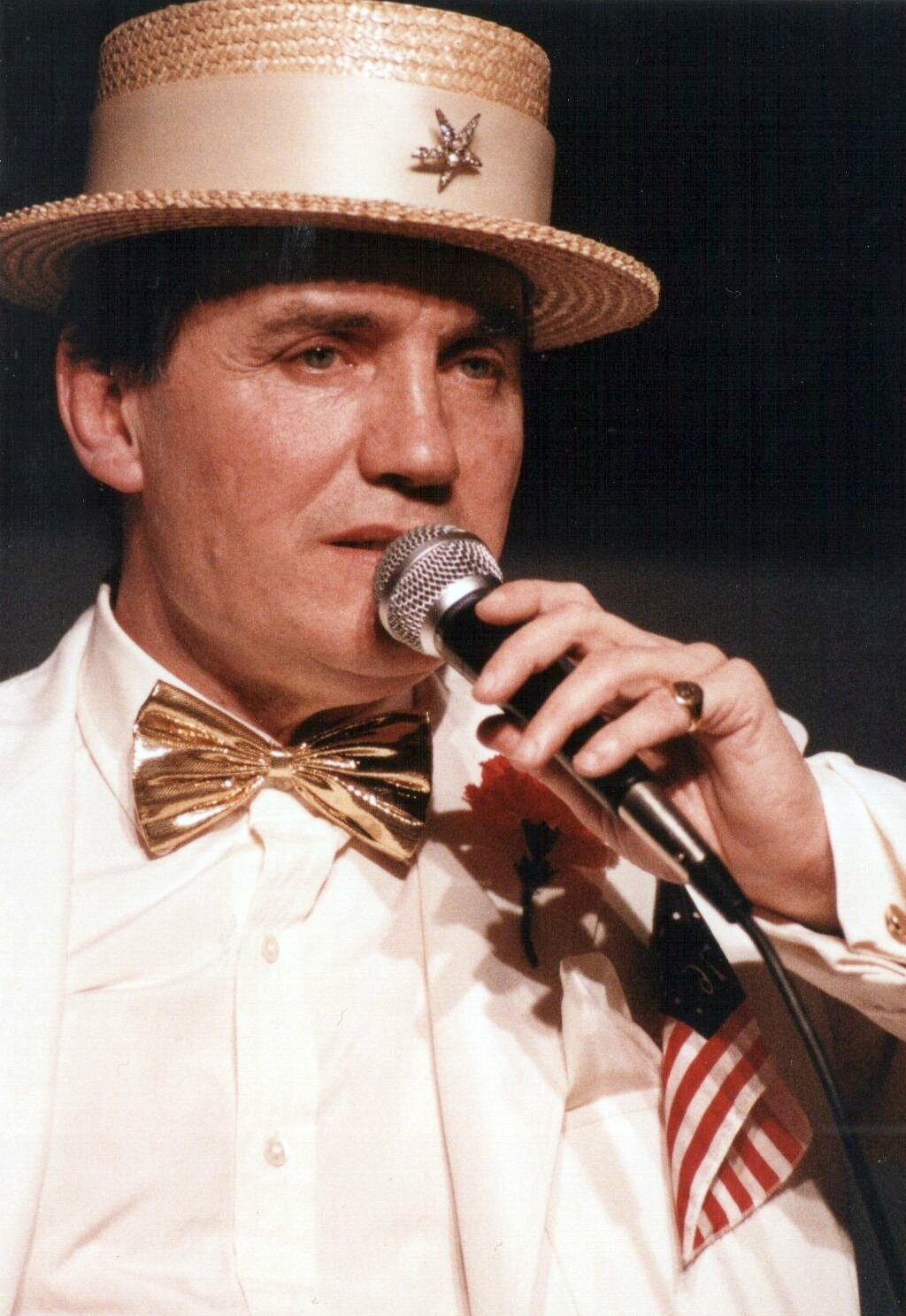
- Ainley at a convention in Baltimore, Maryland, in March 1987
- Born: Anthony Holmes; 20 August 1932; London, England
- Died: 3 May 2004 (aged 71); Harrow, London, England
- Education: Royal Academy of Dramatic Art
- Years active: 1942, 1965–1989, 1997
- Father: Henry Ainley
- Relatives: Richard Ainley (half-brother)

Anthony Ainley (born Anthony Holmes; 20 August 1932 – 3 May 2004) was an English actor. He is best known for portraying the Master in the BBC television series Doctor Who from 1981 to 1989.

== Early life and education ==
Anthony Ainley was born Anthony Holmes in London on 20 August 1932, the illegitimate son of actor Henry Ainley and Clarice Holmes. His older brother Timothy was born in 1931 during his parents' affair. His older half-brother was actor Richard Ainley. Clarice struggled as a single mother and placed her two sons in the Actors’ Orphanage around 1938. During World War II, Anthony and Timothy were evacuated to the United States, where they resided with the Edwin Gould Foundation in New York. In 1945, they returned to new orphanage premises in London.

He attended Cranleigh School from 1947 to 1950. After undertaking his national service in the Parachute Regiment, he started working as an insurance clerk. He was involved in amateur dramatic productions, and while rehearsing an early 1950s production of Rookery Nook he was coached by future Doctor Who star William Hartnell. He subsequently trained at the Royal Academy of Dramatic Art, where in 1963 he began using the stage name Anthony Ainley. He acted in productions of Twelfth Night, You Never Can Tell and The Importance of Being Earnest. At RADA he won the Fabia Drake Prize for Comedy.

== Career ==
Ainley made his screen debut with a bit part in the propaganda comedy film The Foreman Went to France (1942).

Ainley's swarthy appearance tended to get him parts as villains, though an early regular role on British television was as Det. Sgt Hunter, sidekick to William Mervyn's Chief Inspector Rose in the second series of It's Dark Outside in 1966. Other notable roles include a subaltern in the 1969 film version of Oh! What a Lovely War, Dietz in the 1974 film version of The Land That Time Forgot, Reverend Fallowfield in the Tigon film The Blood on Satan's Claw (1971), Henry Sidney in Elizabeth R (1971), Clive Hawksworth in Spyder's Web (1972), Rev. Emilius in the BBC's adaptation of The Pallisers (1974), Johnson in the first episode of the BBC programme Secret Army (1977), and Sunley in The Avengers episode "Noon Doomsday" (1968). He was also one of the Hong Kong policemen who discover James Bond's supposed corpse in the opening sequence of You Only Live Twice (1967). Ainley played the role of the wealthy young peer Lord Charles Gilmour in the LWT series Upstairs, Downstairs (1973).

=== Doctor Who ===
Ainley as the Master in the Doctor Who serial Logopolis (1981)

Reportedly, it was his performance as Rev. Emilius (in The Pallisers) that led to him being offered the role of the Master by John Nathan-Turner, who had worked on The Pallisers seven years before becoming producer of Doctor Who. Ainley first portrayed Nyssa's father Tremas in the 1981 serial The Keeper of Traken, which led to him becoming a new embodiment of The Master. From then on, he appeared in most seasons up until the cancellation of the original series in 1989, including its final serial, Survival.

Ainley's incarnation of The Master spanned four different incarnations of the Doctor. His appearances included the following serials: The Keeper of Traken (1981), Logopolis (1981), Castrovalva (1982), Time-Flight (1982), The King's Demons (1983), The Five Doctors (1983), Planet of Fire (1984), The Mark of the Rani (1985), The Ultimate Foe (1986) and Survival (1989).

He later reprised the role for the 1997 BBC computer game Destiny of the Doctors.

Ainley's great love of the role is often cited in documentaries and DVD commentaries. Script editor Eric Saward claimed that he introduced himself over the phone by saying "This is the Master" and then would laugh. In the commentary and documentary for The Mark of the Rani, both Colin Baker and Kate O'Mara say that "He only ever wanted to play the Master." Baker remarked that he could afford this luxury because he had built up a private income by the mid-1980s and had inherited a considerable sum of money from his father. In "Cat Flap: Making of Survival", Sylvester McCoy confirms that all he ever wanted to be was the Master, and he kept his role active, even when not on set. "He was as scary off camera as he was on it."

== Personal life ==
Ainley neither married nor had children. He joked on the DVD commentary for The Keeper of Traken (which was recorded shortly before his death) that he did not like the three rings of marriage: the engagement ring, the wedding ring and the bickering.

Ainley was a keen sportsman. Initially he was a rugby player, he played at fly-half for the Old Cranleighans, Richmond and Middlesex. Later he turned his attentions to cricket, citing Sophie Aldred (who played Ace) as his friend once he learned that she played the game. He appeared on many occasions for the Stage and London Theatres C.C. mainly as an opening batsman.

Ainley lived in Kingsbury.

== Death ==
Ainley died at Northwick Park Hospital in Harrow, London, on 3 May 2004. The Times' obituary for him listed the cause of death as cancer. He was known to be reclusive, remaining out of the public eye for most of his life after Doctor Who was put on hiatus in 1989.

== Biography ==
In 2015, Fantom Publishing published Karen Louise Hollis's biography of Ainley, titled The Man Behind the Master.

== Filmography ==
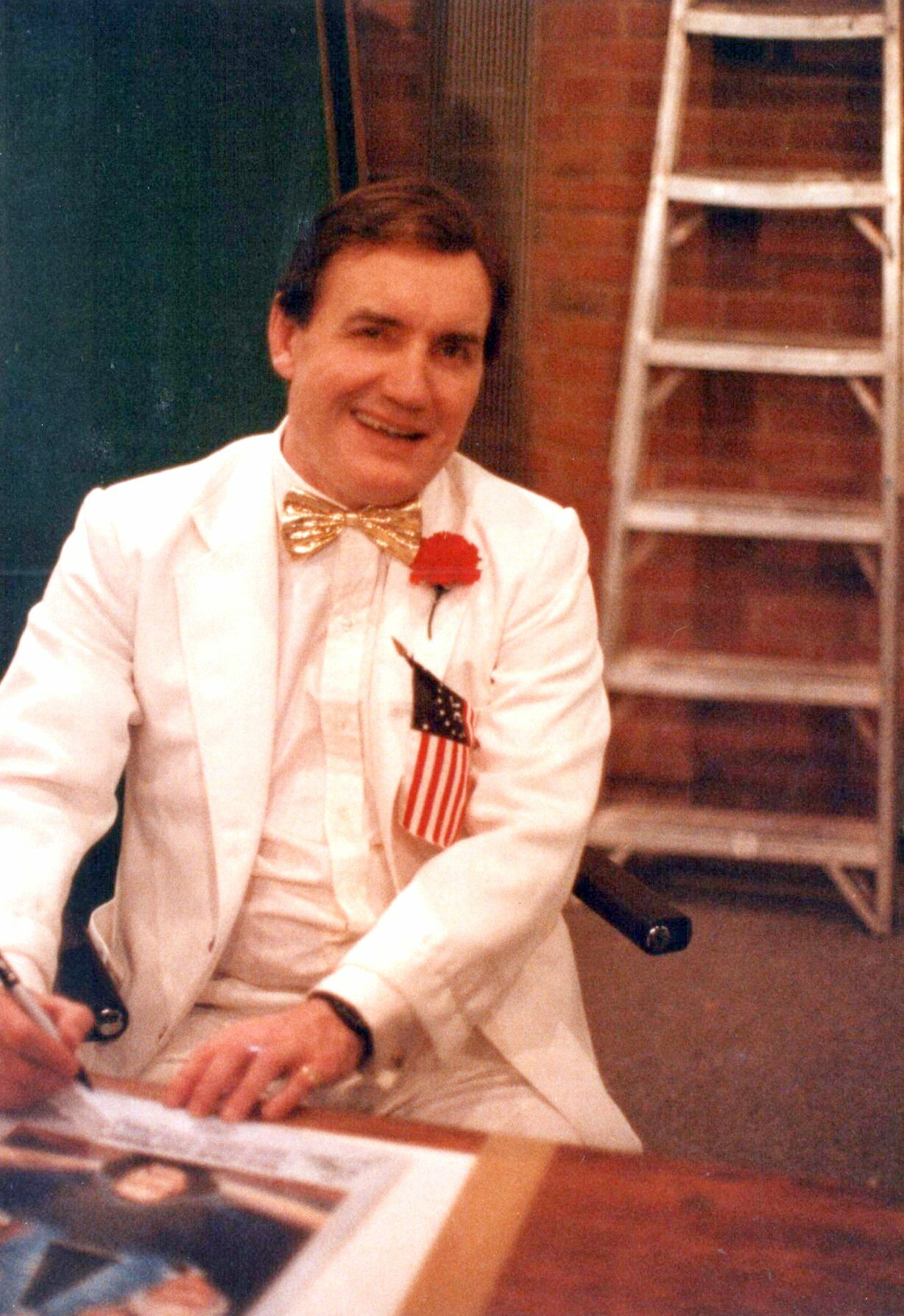
Ainley in 1987

=== Film ===
Year	Title	Role	Notes
1942	The Foreman Went to France		Uncredited
1966	Naked Evil	Dick Alderson	
1967	You Only Live Twice	Hong Kong Policeman #2	Uncredited
1968	Inspector Clouseau	Bomber LeBec	
1968	Joanna	Bruce	
1969	Oh! What a Lovely War	3rd Aide	
1971	Assault	Mr. Bartell	
1971	The Blood on Satan's Claw	Reverend Fallowfield	
1974	The Land That Time Forgot	Dietz	

=== Television ===
Year	Title	Role	Notes
1965	It's Dark Outside	Det. Sgt. Hunter	5 episodes
1967	The Golden Age	Uncredited	1 episode: A Divided Country
1967	Champion House	Leslie Molesworth	1 episode: The Second Freedom
1968	The Avengers	Edward Sunley	1 episode: Noon-Doomsday
1968	The Champions	Landing party lookout #1	1 episode: The Dark Island
1969	Who-Dun-It	Paul Verrier	1 episode: The Fall of a Goddess
1970	Department S	Supervisor	1 episode: A Ticket to Nowhere
1970	Biography	Trelawny	1 episode: Byron
1971	Doomwatch	Senior House Officer	1 episode: No Room for Error
1971	Play for Today	Surgeon	1 episode: The Rainbirds
1971	Elizabeth R	Henry Sidney	1 episode: The Marriage Game
1971	Out of the Unknown	Frank Bowers-One	1 episode: Welcome Home
1971	Brett	Gerard Delamore	2 episodes
1971	Hassan	Ishak	TV movie
1972	The Adventurer	Kerston	1 episode: The Bradley Way
1972	The Shadow of the Tower	Sir William Courtney	1 episode: The Man Who Never Was
1972	Clouds of Witness	Dennis Cathcart	1 episode
1972	Spyder's Web	Clive Hawksworth	13 episodes
1972	BBC Play of the Month	Ferdinand Gadd	1 episode: Trelawny of the Wells
1973	Warship	Phillip Tashing	1 episode: A Standing and Jumping War
1973	Orson Welles Great Mysteries	Lafarge	1 episode: The Ingenious Reporter
1973	Upstairs, Downstairs	Lord Charles Gilmour	3 episodes
1974	The Pallisers	Rev. Emilius	7 episodes
1975	Anne of Avonlea	Stephen Irving	1 episode
1976	The Flight of the Heron	Lord George Murray	1 episode
1976	The Fortune Hunters	Leslie Symington	TV movie
1976	Within These Walls	James Buckingham	1 episode: Visitors
1977	Nicholas Nickleby	Sir Mulberry Hawk	4 episodes
1977	Secret Army	Johnson	1 episode: Lisa – Codename Yvette
1977	Target	Alexander Trist	1 episode: Carve Up
1978	The Devil's Crown	Pope Innocent III	1 episode: Tainted King
1978	Lillie	Lord Carrington	2 episodes
1980	Mackenzie	Richard Wilcox	3 episodes
1981	Doctor Who	Tremas	4 episodes; serial The Keeper of Traken
1981–1986, 1989	Doctor Who	The Master	27 episodes; serials The Keeper of Traken, Logopolis, Castrovalva, Time-Flight, The King's Demons, The Five Doctors, Planet of Fire, The Caves of Androzani, The Mark of the Rani, The Ultimate Foe, and Survival
1982	Doctor Who	Portreeve	2 episodes; serial Castrovalva
1982	Doctor Who	Kalid (as Leon Ny Taiy)	1 episode; serial Time-Flight
1983	Doctor Who	Sir Gilles Estram	1 episode; serial The King's Demons
1983	The Boy Who Won the Pools	Mr. Simmons	2 episodes
1997	Destiny of the Doctors	The Master	Video game; Final role
