= Vislor Turlough =

Fictional character from Doctor Who

- Doctor Who character
- Turlough in a promotional photograph for Doctor Who
- First appearance: Mawdryn Undead (1983)
- Last appearance: The Caves of Androzani (1984)
- Portrayed by: Mark Strickson
- Duration: 1983–1984

In-universe information
- Species: Trion
- Occupation: Astrophysicist
- Affiliation: Fifth Doctor
- Home: Trion
- Home era: 1983

Vislor Turlough (/ˈtɜːr.loʊ/, TUR-loh) is a fictional character played by Mark Strickson in the long-running British science fiction television series Doctor Who. He was a companion of the Fifth Doctor, being a regular in the programme from 1983 to 1984. Turlough is an alien from the planet Trion who seeks to kill the Fifth Doctor on orders from the antagonist known as the Black Guardian. Turlough later chooses to side with the Doctor, accompanying him until Turlough's departure from the series in the 1984 serial Planet of Fire.

Turlough was created during a script meeting with script editor Eric Saward, who liked the concept of a companion who existed to try to kill the Doctor. Strickson was requested to be cast in the part by his agent, and was one of the last actors producer John Nathan-Turner saw in the auditions for Turlough's character. Nathan-Turner enjoyed Strickson's performance and offered him the part, with Strickson turning down a potential role in the series Angels to appear in Doctor Who.

Turlough's role in the series was criticized by literary critic John Kenneth Muir, who believed Turlough to be underdeveloped despite Strickson's good acting performance. Other critics felt the character's writing quality varied, though he has received analysis in the book Who is Who?, which analyzed his development as a result of his interactions with the Doctor.

== Character history ==
Turlough first appears in the serial Mawdryn Undead, where he is a student of retired Brigadier Lethbridge-Stewart. Turlough is an alien in exile, and after nearly dying in a car accident, is contacted by the malevolent Black Guardian, who offers to take him back to his home planet if he kills the Fifth Doctor, which is an offer that Turlough accepts. At the end of the serial, Turlough asks to accompany the Doctor. Despite the suspicions of the Doctor's other companions, the Doctor lets Turlough join him and the others in the TARDIS.

Turlough accompanies the Doctor but fails in his attempts on his life in Terminus, proving hesitant in his attempts to kill the Doctor. In the serial Enlightenment, Turlough joins in the race to obtain the titular "Enlightenment". He is given the choice to give the power from the Enlightenment to either the Doctor or the Black Guardian, and chooses the Doctor, freeing himself from the Black Guardian's pact. Turlough continues to accompany the Doctor following this point.

Turlough makes his final appearance in the serial Planet of Fire, where it is revealed that Turlough is a junior ensign commander from the planet Trion. Following a civil war on his home planet, in which his mother was killed, Turlough's family were arrested as political prisoners. His father and younger brother Malkon were exiled to the planet Sarn while Turlough himself was exiled to Earth. Turlough discovers that political prisoners are no longer treated harshly on Trion, and decides to return home. Turlough makes a brief cameo in the following serial, The Caves of Androzani, where he appears as a hallucination encouraging the Doctor not to die.

Turlough later appeared in a short episode released alongside the announcement of a Blu-ray boxset of Doctor Who season 21. In the episode, Turlough sends a distress signal to the Fifth Doctor and Tegan Jovanka requesting aid due to Trion being invaded by the Daleks.

== Development ==
The concept for Turlough was created at a script conference with script editor Eric Saward. The concept of a companion who would be working to kill the Doctor proved appealing to Saward, and so they went ahead with the idea. The character was conceived as having his duplicity known by both the audience and the other characters, including the Doctor, though the latter would pretend to be unaware of Turlough's actions until Turlough was faced with the choice to kill him. It was deemed boring for the character to hold strictly to the concept of "evil companion turned good", and thus it was decided that Turlough would continue to show hints of potential betrayal even after proving himself to the Doctor. Lead actor Peter Davison remarked that it was one of producer John Nathan-Turner's attempts to give the Doctor a "companion with attitude", citing previous examples like Adric and Tegan.

According to Nathan-Turner, Strickson's agent, Jan Evans, had recommended Strickson to Nathan-Turner, believing Strickson fit Turlough's character perfectly. Strickson at the time was in a medical drama television series called Angels. A lead actor had fallen ill, and according to Strickson, he had been cast in the lead role without any prior conversation, and wasn't keen on doing the part. Julia Smith, who was producing Angels, encouraged Nathan-Turner to cancel Strickson's audition, but Nathan-Turner went through with it regardless. With a cast celebration party imminent on Angels, Strickson went to the home of Nathan-Turner and held his audition for Turlough there. Afterward, Nathan-Turner got Saward to see Strickson's audition. Strickson was contacted later that day with confirmation that he had been cast, though Nathan-Turner continued to host auditions for Turlough for the next two weeks, with the other actors who auditioned being cast in other roles in Doctor Who. Strickson accepted the part.

Strickson naturally has blond hair, which Nathan-Turner believed problematic due to Davison also having blond hair. According to Strickson, Nathan-Turner originally pitched that Turlough should be bald, but Strickson was able to convince Nathan-Turner against it by requiring additional fees to make up for it. Nathan-Turner then pitched that Strickson should have red hair, which Strickson agreed to. Nathan-Turner used washout dye for Strickson's hair dye, but the dye did not wash out, resulting in Strickson's hair remaining red for the entirety of his time on the show. According to Strickson, it made him substantially more recognizable in public, and children would run in fear of him. Strickson's wife would know of his return home because children would shout "There goes Turlough! Hello Turlough!" when they saw him. Strickson had strong influence on Turlough's costume choice, stating that he wanted the costume to be consistent so Turlough was instantly recognizable. As a result, Turlough's schoolboy costume remained consistent, which Strickson believed worked well due to the contrast between the black suit and the costumes of his co-stars. Nathan-Turner changed Turlough's costume for his last story, as there was significant fan demand to see Turlough's legs according to Strickson. Strickson stated that he did not want to wear shorts, but Planet of Fire was written with a scene requiring Turlough to swim in a hot locale, necessitating shorts.

During filming, Strickson had gripes with the "two-dimensional" acting of the show, and attempted to give Turlough more depth by building relationships in the background. According to Strickson, he attempted to form relationships with nearly every female cast member to attempt to make the show more interesting, with the attempts of both him and Janet Fielding, who portrayed Tegan, being the most prominent one, with it being picked up on by the writers. Strickson, when annoyed by another actor, would frequently get into shot and interact with the TARDIS console while they were speaking, requiring the sound designers to put sound effects over the shot in editing to make the TARDIS appear functional. Strickson primarily enjoyed his time on the show, citing the filming of the episode Enlightenment as a favorite. He disliked the filming of the episode Terminus due to its atmosphere and because the amount of crawling Strickson had to do resulted in his costume's trousers becoming worn out. According to Strickson, he signed to do his own stunts. He stopped after an incident filming Enlightenment, in which a harness attached around the actor's crotch broke, causing injury. Strickson stated that he was unable to walk properly for two weeks afterward. The prop used by Strickson for communicating with the Black Guardian also proved problematic, as the light in the prop could only be turned off and on by another crew member carrying the battery. Strickson would shake his leg to indicate he wanted it on or off, and if the crew member could not see the shaking, Strickson had to carry on with the scene. According to Strickson, there are many outtakes where he had to stop filming because the prop's light was too hot and threatened to burn his hand.

Turlough's role was very political, and his exile and backstory in relation to his home planet Trion acted as an allegory for what was going on in Poland during the period of the Iron Curtain. According to Strickson, Turlough was very "socialist – an interplanetary thinker, a freedom fighter." Many of the character's political speeches were cut. By the time of his departure from the series, Turlough's character had evolved into a trustworthy figure for the Doctor, though Turlough still acted out for his own interests on occasion.

According to Davison, Turlough proved problematic with the writers, as the writers were unsure of how long they should have Turlough attempt to kill the Doctor for. Due to disagreements, Turlough was frequently held prisoner for several episodes at a time to sidestep the issue entirely. Additionally, Strickson would frequently act scenes as if Turlough had knowledge equivalent to the Doctor, which Fielding also did. As a result, Nathan-Turner forced both Strickson and Fielding to "dumb down" their performances due to how boring it made the programme, which Strickson stated in 1990 was part of why he left the series, as he believed there wasn't room for his character to work within the series' structure. According to Strickson in an earlier 1985 interview with Fantasy Empire, he decided to leave the series due to Davison also leaving at the same time.

== Reception ==
Literary critic John Kenneth Muir criticized Turlough as being an ineffectual character, stating that while introduced as a big deal in his debut episode, he was frequently portrayed as incompetent. He believed that after the resolution of the Black Guardian plot-line, Turlough lost a purpose in the series, as he could not act as the leading hero (Which was the Doctor's role) and many of the action elements of the series did not require a second male lead. Muir believed Turlough to be one of the series' most underdeveloped elements, and a failure of his initial role. Muir, despite his criticism, praised Strickson's performance, and found Turlough's ending in Planet of Fire to be "satisfactory". Andrew Blair, writing for Den of Geek, highlighted Turlough's departure, stating that while Turlough was undeveloped after his appearance in Enlightenment, the departure was well-written. Blair also highlighted how Planet of Fire allowed Turlough to use intelligence, unlike his other appearances.

Fantasy Empire described Turlough as being a reliable character in the series, being a strong character who could function individually of the Doctor. They felt that his reunion with his species in Planet of Fire made the character appear gullible, unlike his prior characterization. Author Kevin S. Decker, writing for the book Who is Who?, found the Doctor's role in taking on Turlough to be an attempt by the Doctor to make up for the death of Adric earlier in the series. He also found Turlough's choice in Enlightenment to betray the Black Guardian in favor of the Doctor to be a culmination of Turlough's growth at the hands of the Doctor, with Turlough accepting his responsibility for his actions and making an authentic choice of his own accord. Tanya Huff, writing in the book Queers Dig Time Lords, described Turlough's tendency to keep secrets, as well as the character's intensity, to appear akin to a romantic partner for the Fifth Doctor, which Huff cited as laying the ground for the eventual debut of Jack Harkness, the show's first openly bisexual character.
