= Mark Strickson =

British TV producer and actor (born 1959)

- Born: 6 April 1959 (age 67); Stratford-upon-Avon, Warwickshire, England
- Years active: 1982–present
- Known for: Playing Vislor Turlough in Doctor Who
- Spouses: Julie Brennon (divorced); Delny Britton (divorced); Lisa Strickson
- Children: 1

Mark Strickson (born 6 April 1959) is an English television producer and actor best known for playing companion Vislor Turlough in Doctor Who from 1983 to 1984.

== Early life ==
Strickson was born in Stratford-upon-Avon, England. He attended King Edward VI Grammar School in his home town, the same school as William Shakespeare, and was also a chorister at Holy Trinity Church (Shakespeare's Church), where his father, John Strickson, was organist and choirmaster. He studied drama at RADA in London.

== Career ==
As an actor, Strickson appeared in the BBC medical series Angels before landing his part in Doctor Who, co-starring with Peter Davison and Janet Fielding between 1983 and 1984. He appeared at Doctor Who's 20th-anniversary celebrations in Longleat in 1983, alongside many other cast and crew members from the series. He also played the young Ebenezer Scrooge in the 1984 television film A Christmas Carol starring George C. Scott.

After this, Strickson emigrated to Australia, where he studied zoology at the Armidale campus of the University of New England, part-funding his education by teaching theatre studies for five years. He subsequently relocated to Dunedin, New Zealand, where he took up residence. He appeared in a television advertising campaign for Strepsils throat lozenges which aired in Australia and New Zealand in 1993. Strickson became a documentary producer and director, especially of wildlife documentary programmes. He has produced programmes for, amongst others, the Discovery Channel, the BBC, ITV, Channel 4 and Animal Planet. In this capacity, he brought Steve Irwin, the "Crocodile Hunter", to public attention with such shows as The Ten Deadliest Snakes in the World.

Strickson has reprised the role of Turlough in the Big Finish Productions Doctor Who audio dramas. He has also contributed interviews and voiceover commentaries for DVD releases of his various Doctor Who serials.

== Filmography ==
=== Television ===
Year	Title	Role	Notes
1982	Strangers	1st PC	Episode: The Lost Chord
1982	Juliet Bravo	Geoff	Episode: Nothing to Report
1982	Angels	Terry	6 episodes
1983–1984	Doctor Who	Vislor Turlough	32 episodes
1984	A Christmas Carol	Young Scrooge	TV movie
1985	Bergerac	West	Episode: Low Profile
1986	David Copperfield	Markham	TV Serial
1987	Strike It Rich!	Photographer	Episode: Second Childhood
1987	Flying Lady	Simon Gould	Episode: The Test
1988	Casualty	Gynaecological Registrar	Episode Absolution
1989	Cassidy	Doctor	TV movie
1989	Fear in Fun Park	Simon Rawlings	TV movie
1990	Rafferty's Rules	Gavin Keyes	Episode: A Fair Day's Work
1993	Minder	Swan	Episode: For a Few Dollars More
1993	Police Rescue	Carter	Episode: Speeding
1998	Lust in Space	Prosecutor	Documentary

=== Video games ===
Year	Title	Role	Notes
2003	Advanced Warriors	Guardian Force	
