= Janet Fielding =

Australian actress (born 1953)

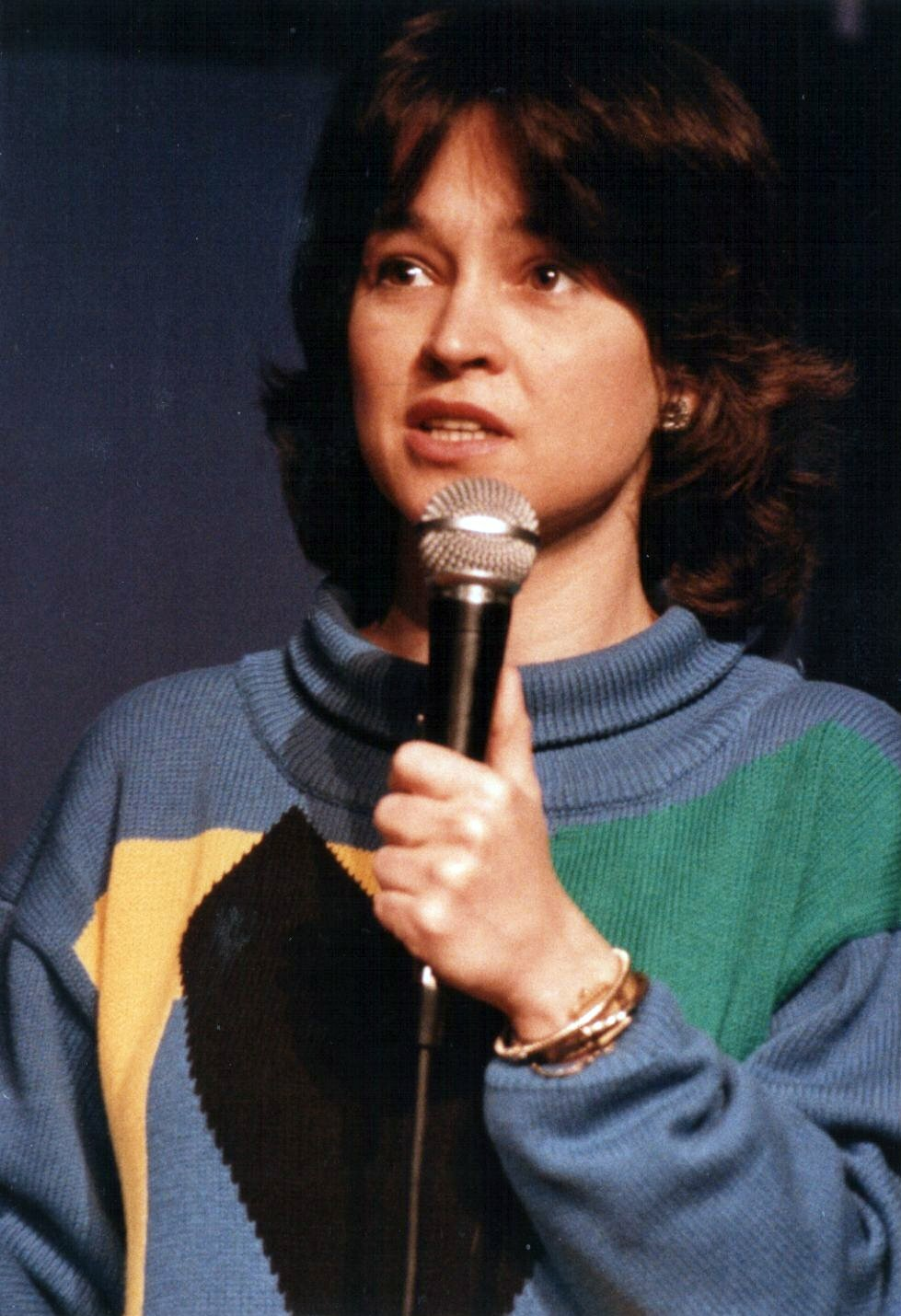
- Fielding at a convention in Baltimore, Maryland, March 1987
- Born: Janet Claire Mahoney; 9 September 1953 (age 73); Brisbane, Queensland, Australia
- Education: University of Queensland
- Occupation: Actress
- Years active: 1977–1991, 2006–present
- Notable work: Tegan Jovanka in Doctor Who (1981–1984, 2022)
- Spouse: Nicholas Davies (m. 1982; div. 1991)

Janet Claire Mahoney (born 9 September 1953), known professionally as Janet Fielding, is an Australian actress and talent agent. She played Tegan Jovanka, a companion of the Fifth Doctor, in the BBC science fiction series Doctor Who (1981–1984, 2022).

== Early life ==
Fielding was born Janet Claire Mahoney in Brisbane. After spending some of her childhood schooldays in America, Fielding studied at the University of Queensland, from which she graduated with a degree in English. She planned to become a reporter for the Australian Broadcasting Corporation, and journalism had been a major part of her degree course. Instead, she moved to Britain to become an actress. After arriving in Britain she joined an actors' cooperative.

== Career ==
As 'Janet Clare Fielding' she made her UK TV debut in the Hammer House of Horror episode "Charlie Boy", which aired in October 1980 as it was announced she had been cast as the next Doctor Who companion. She got the Doctor Who companion role after a number of interviews and auditions.

Between 1981 and 1984, Fielding played the part of Tegan Jovanka, a companion of the Fourth Doctor for his four episode story Logopolis only (played by Tom Baker), and later of the Fifth Doctor (Peter Davison) in 18 of his stories, as well as in the regeneration sequence for his final 20th story. She made a guest appearance on Jim'll Fix It in a Doctor Who-related sketch alongside Colin Baker's Doctor in 1985 (A Fix with Sontarans). She played Mel during Sylvester McCoy's audition for the part of the Seventh Doctor. In 1982 she had a small role as the waitress Tracy in the ITV sitcom Shelley. In 1984 she had a role in two ITV series, Minder and the children's drama Murphy's Mob. This was followed in 1985 with a part in another ITV series called Hold the Back Page.

In 1991, Fielding gave up acting to take up an administrative position with Women in Film and Television UK. While she maintained the administrative position for only three and a half years, she continued with the group afterwards, managing the Skillset study on successful women in television in 2009. During that time, Fielding worked as a theatrical agent, at one point representing Paul McGann when he took the role of the Eighth Doctor.

She returned to acting and the role of Tegan for Big Finish Productions audio plays including The Gathering (2006), Cobwebs and The Cradle of the Snake (2010) alongside Peter Davison as the Fifth Doctor. She had been initially reluctant to reprise her role for Big Finish; at Doctor Who conventions she has stated this reluctance was due primarily to her work as a theatrical agent, as she perceived a potential conflict of interest in working as an actor while representing actors. She has confirmed that she will continue to appear as Tegan in future audio stories. Fielding has also provided audio commentaries for several DVD releases of Tegan's Doctor Who stories and appeared in DVD extras for Frontier in Space and Planet of the Daleks, stories in which she did not appear, where she provided critiques on the portrayal of female characters in the serials.

Fielding has worked as the head of finance for a charity. She is Project Co-ordinator for Project MotorHouse, a charity based in Ramsgate, UK, which aims to modernise the old motor museum into a multi-use venue featuring offices, bars, a restaurant, a café and cinemas, where local youths will have a chance to learn from successful businesses.

In August 2013, Fielding contributed to the one-off special show Doctor Who Live: The Next Doctor in an interview segment with other companions and Doctors, and she appeared in the 50th-anniversary comedy homage The Five(ish) Doctors Reboot.

Fielding reprised the role of Tegan in the October 2022 Doctor Who BBC centenary special "The Power of the Doctor", alongside Sophie Aldred as Ace and in the episode she reunites with Peter Davison as the Fifth Doctor.

In a 2023 interview, Fielding reflected on her role as the first Australian companion in Doctor Who, stating, "I was not only the first Australian companion, but I was the first companion who wasn't a Brit." She also discussed her return in "The Power of the Doctor", noting that it had been over 30 years since she had last acted on camera, and described the experience as both exciting and daunting. Speaking about the impact of the series, she remarked, "I got to learn 10 years later what a privilege it was to be a treasured part of so many childhoods and adolescents… and how lucky you were that that was part of your life."

She reprised the role in the series Tales of the TARDIS.

== Personal life ==
In 1982 Fielding married Daily Mirror foreign editor Nicholas Davies. They divorced in 1991. In September 2012, Fielding revealed she was being treated for cancer. She has not remarried and has no children. She is close friends with her Doctor Who co-star Peter Davison even godmother to one of his children.

== Filmography ==
=== Television ===
Year	Title	Role	Notes
1980	Hammer House of Horror	Secretary Mandy	Episode: "Charlie Boy" (credited as Janet Clare Fielding)
1981–1984, 2022	Doctor Who	Tegan Jovanka	Regular: 1981–1984 (66 episodes); Guest: "The Power of the Doctor" (2022)
1982	Shelley	Tracy	Episode: "Slaughterhouse Sling"
1983	The Adventure Game	Herself - Visitor	Series 3; episode 5
1984	Murphy's Mob	Caroline	Series 3; 7 episodes
1984	Minder	Janice	Episode: "Windows"
1985	Jim'll Fix It	Tegan Jovanka	Series 11; episode 10
1986	Hold the Back Page	Deborah Simons	Mini-series; episode: "Power Games"
1988	Blind Justice	Doctor	Mini-series; episode: "Death in the Family"
1991	Parnell and the Englishwoman	Attractive woman	Mini-series; episode: "The Libel"
2013	The Five(ish) Doctors Reboot	Herself	Television short film
2016	Prisoner Zero	Dr. Mendez (voice)	Episode: "Breakout"
2023	Tales of the TARDIS	Tegan Jovanka	Mini-series; episode: "Earthshock"
2025	Austin	Herself	Series 2; episode 6 (uncredited)
