= Doctor Who season 19 =

1982 season of British sci-fi TV series

Doctor Who
- Season 19
- Cover art of the Blu-ray release for the complete season
- Starring: Peter Davison; Matthew Waterhouse; Sarah Sutton; Janet Fielding
- No. of stories: 7
- No. of episodes: 26

Release
- Original network: BBC1
- Original release: 4 January – 30 March 1982

Season chronology
- ← Previous; Season 18 Next → Season 20

The nineteenth season of British science fiction television series Doctor Who began on 4 January 1982 with Castrovalva, and ended with Time-Flight. John Nathan-Turner produced the series, with two script editors: Anthony Root and Eric Saward.

== Casting ==
=== Main cast ===
- Peter Davison as the Fifth Doctor
- Matthew Waterhouse as Adric
- Sarah Sutton as Nyssa
- Janet Fielding as Tegan Jovanka

Season 19 saw the introduction of Peter Davison as the Fifth Doctor. Tegan Jovanka (Janet Fielding), Nyssa (Sarah Sutton) and Adric (Matthew Waterhouse) were his companions. Adric is killed off in the climax of Earthshock; a rare instance in the series of a companion dying.

=== Recurring stars ===
- Anthony Ainley as The Master

Anthony Ainley returns in Castrovalva and Time-Flight as the Master.

=== Guest stars ===
David Banks makes the first of four appearances in the show as a Cyber-leader beginning in Earthshock.

== Development ==
Multiple stories were scrapped from this season. The Enemy Within, by Christopher Priest, would have revealed a powerful being that fed off fear inside of the TARDIS that powered it; it also would have written out Adric. Priest's scripts were submitted, but were deemed unusable by the production team. Following a dispute regarding payment by the production team, Nathan-Turner and Saward wrote Priest a letter of apology. Writer Gerry Davis was intended to write a story titled Genesis of the Cybermen, which would have explored the creation of the Cybermen on their home planet Mondas and act as a prequel to 1966's The Tenth Planet. The idea was ultimately scrapped, however. Project Zeta Sigma by John Flanagan and Andrew McCulloch would have focused on nuclear disarmament, planned as the Fifth Doctor's first story, but the scripts were deemed unworkable and was dropped. Other scrapped scripts included Hebos by Rod Beacham, The Psychrons by Terence Greer, and The Torson Triumvirate by Andrew Smith.

== Serials ==
Antony Root served as script editor for Four to Doomsday and The Visitation, after which he was replaced by Eric Saward. Saward's work as script editor included the opening serial, Castrovalva, which was filmed later in the production run, and Earthshock, for which Root is credited due to Saward being the scriptwriter. The show moved from its traditional once-weekly Saturday broadcast to twice-weekly, primarily on Monday and Tuesday, although there were regional variations to the schedule.

Black Orchid was the first purely historical story, with no science-fiction elements save for the TARDIS and its crew, since The Highlanders from Season 4; it was also the first two-part serial since The Sontaran Experiment in Season 12, and the first of a regular run of a two-parter every season until the change of format to 45 minute episodes in Season 22.

No. story	No. in season	Serial title	Episode titles	Directed by	Written by	Original release date	Prod. code	UK viewers (millions)	AI
116	1	Castrovalva	"Part One"	Fiona Cumming	Christopher H. Bidmead	4 January 1982	5Z	9.1	–
116	1	Castrovalva	"Part Two"	Fiona Cumming	Christopher H. Bidmead	5 January 1982	5Z	8.6	–
116	1	Castrovalva	"Part Three"	Fiona Cumming	Christopher H. Bidmead	11 January 1982	5Z	10.2	–
116	1	Castrovalva	"Part Four"	Fiona Cumming	Christopher H. Bidmead	12 January 1982	5Z	10.4	–
While the Doctor retreats to the TARDIS Zero Room to recover from his regeneration, the Master kidnaps Adric and sends the TARDIS hurtling back in time to the Big Bang, where it will be torn apart. Tegan and Nyssa manage to save the time machine, and soon find themselves arriving in the town of Castrovalva, a place legendary for its serene atmosphere. There they hope that the Doctor will be able to recuperate from his recent trauma. But the Master is lurking in Castrovalva, and it soon becomes clear that he has drawn the time travellers into a trap from which there may be no escape.
117	2	Four to Doomsday	"Part One"	John Black	Terence Dudley	18 January 1982	5W	8.4	–
117	2	Four to Doomsday	"Part Two"	John Black	Terence Dudley	19 January 1982	5W	8.8	–
117	2	Four to Doomsday	"Part Three"	John Black	Terence Dudley	25 January 1982	5W	8.9	–
117	2	Four to Doomsday	"Part Four"	John Black	Terence Dudley	26 January 1982	5W	9.4	–
Trying to get Tegan home, the Doctor instead lands the TARDIS on a spaceship heading towards Earth. Its owner, the frog-like Monarch, has visited Earth four times in the past, kidnapping specimens of human culture on each occasion. His true goal, however, is to find a way to travel faster than light, thereby going back to the beginning of time where he hopes to meet God, whom he believes is actually himself. In pursuit of this aim, he has exhausted the resources of his home planet, Urbanka. Now he intends to transplant the Urbankans to Earth – and eradicate humanity to make room for his people.
118	3	Kinda	"Part One"	Peter Grimwade	Christopher Bailey	1 February 1982	5Y	8.4	–
118	3	Kinda	"Part Two"	Peter Grimwade	Christopher Bailey	2 February 1982	5Y	9.4	–
118	3	Kinda	"Part Three"	Peter Grimwade	Christopher Bailey	8 February 1982	5Y	8.5	–
118	3	Kinda	"Part Four"	Peter Grimwade	Christopher Bailey	9 February 1982	5Y	8.9	–
The TARDIS brings the Doctor, Adric, Nyssa and Tegan to the idyllic jungle world of Deva Loka, which is being surveyed for possible Earth colonisation. Deva Loka is already home to a race of apparent savages, however: a mysterious people with strange powers which have mentally unbalanced the members of the expedition. To make matters worse, an ancient enemy of the natives – a serpentine being called the Mara – still lurks on Deva Loka. The Mara is intent upon revenge, and latches onto Tegan's mind as its bridgehead to victory.
119	4	The Visitation	"Part One"	Peter Moffatt	Eric Saward	15 February 1982	5X	9.1	–
119	4	The Visitation	"Part Two"	Peter Moffatt	Eric Saward	16 February 1982	5X	9.3	–
119	4	The Visitation	"Part Three"	Peter Moffatt	Eric Saward	22 February 1982	5X	9.9	–
119	4	The Visitation	"Part Four"	Peter Moffatt	Eric Saward	23 February 1982	5X	10.1	–
In the 17th century, the Great Plague is rampant throughout England. The Doctor, Adric, Nyssa and Tegan discover that aliens – the Terileptils – are operating in a small village. They have taken control of much of the local population and are driving away the rest using an android disguised as the Grim Reaper. With the help of unemployed thespian Richard Mace, the Doctor learns that the Terileptils intend to rid the Earth of humanity, and have amassed an army of plague-carrying rats to help them finish the deed.
120	5	Black Orchid	"Part One"	Ron Jones	Terence Dudley	1 March 1982	6A	9.9	–
120	5	Black Orchid	"Part Two"	Ron Jones	Terence Dudley	2 March 1982	6A	10.1	–
The Doctor, Adric, Nyssa and Tegan find themselves in 1925 England, where through a case of mistaken identity they become involved in a charity cricket match at Cranleigh Halt. There, Nyssa discovers that Charles Cranleigh's fiancee, Ann Talbot, is her exact double. The Cranleighs harbour a dark family secret, however: a hideous monster hidden in a secret wing of their house. Fixated on Ann, it breaks out during a costume ball and attempts to kidnap her... but takes Nyssa by mistake.
121	6	Earthshock	"Part One"	Peter Grimwade	Eric Saward	8 March 1982	6B	9.1	–
121	6	Earthshock	"Part Two"	Peter Grimwade	Eric Saward	9 March 1982	6B	8.8	–
121	6	Earthshock	"Part Three"	Peter Grimwade	Eric Saward	15 March 1982	6B	9.8	–
121	6	Earthshock	"Part Four"	Peter Grimwade	Eric Saward	16 March 1982	6B	9.6	–
In the 26th century, the Doctor, Adric, Nyssa and Tegan come to the aid of a platoon of soldiers investigating the murder of a scientific team in a cave complex on Earth. The Doctor discovers that the killers are actually androids serving the Cybermen, and are guarding a bomb intended to destroy the planet. The Doctor disarms the explosive but by tracing the detonation signal, he learns that the greatest danger is yet to come. The Cybermen have secreted themselves on board a freighter heading for Earth, which will unknowingly serve as the bridgehead for a massive invasion.
122	7	Time-Flight	"Part One"	Ron Jones	Peter Grimwade	22 March 1982	6C	10.0	–
122	7	Time-Flight	"Part Two"	Ron Jones	Peter Grimwade	23 March 1982	6C	8.5	–
122	7	Time-Flight	"Part Three"	Ron Jones	Peter Grimwade	29 March 1982	6C	8.9	–
122	7	Time-Flight	"Part Four"	Ron Jones	Peter Grimwade	30 March 1982	6C	8.1	–
When a Concorde disappears, the Doctor discovers that it has been hijacked back through time to the Pleistocene Era. Arriving there, he, Nyssa and Tegan find that the Concorde's crew and passengers have been enslaved by the sinister Kalid, who is forcing them to excavate a sanctum within a mysterious citadel. Entombed within is the consciousness of a gestalt race called the Xeraphin, who possess devastating mental powers. The Doctor learns that Kalid is really the Master, who plans to harness the evil side of the Xeraphin in order to wreak havoc throughout the cosmos.

== Broadcast ==
The entire season was broadcast from 4 January to 30 March 1982. For the first time in the series' history (apart from season 11 broadcasts on BBC1 Wales), new Doctor Who episodes were not broadcast on Saturdays, but in a twice weekly format on Mondays and Tuesdays.

The episodes of Season 19 of Doctor Who that aired on Tuesdays in England, Scotland and Northern Ireland, were aired on Wednesdays on BBC1 Wales, one day after the rest of the UK.

== Home media ==
=== VHS releases ===
Season	Story no.	Serial name	Duration	Release date		
Season	Story no.	Serial name	Duration	UK	Australia	USA / Canada
19	116	Castrovalva	4 × 25 min.	March 1992	September 1992	October 1993
19	117	Four to Doomsday	4 × 25 min.	September 2001	November 2001	June 2002
19	118	Kinda	4 × 24 min.	October 1994	February 1995	June 1996
19	119; 120	The Visitation; Black Orchid	6 × 25 min.	July 1994; 2 × VHS	August 1994	June 1996; 2 × VHS
19	121	Earthshock	4 × 25 min.	September 1992	March 1993	March 1993
19	122	Time-Flight	4 × 25 min.	July 2000	July 2000	March 2001

=== DVD and Blu-ray releases ===
All releases are for DVD unless otherwise indicated:

- ^{(B)} indicates a Blu-ray release

Season	Story no.	Serial name	Duration	Release date		
Season	Story no.	Serial name	Duration	R2	R4	R1
19	116	Castrovalva (Note: Only available as part of the New Beginnings box set in Regions 2 and 4. Available individually or in the box set in Region 1.)	4 × 25 min.	29 January 2007	7 March 2007	5 June 2007
19	117	Four to Doomsday	4 × 25 min.	15 September 2008	4 December 2008	6 January 2009
19	118	Kinda (Note: Only available as part of the Mara Tales box set in Regions 2 and 4. Only available individually in Region 1.)	4 × 25 min.	7 March 2011	7 April 2011	12 April 2011
19	119	The Visitation	4 × 25 min.	19 January 2004	8 April 2004	1 March 2005
19	119	The Visitation (Special Edition)	4 × 25 min.	6 May 2013	15 May 2013	14 May 2013
19	120	Black Orchid	2 × 25 min.	14 April 2008	5 June 2008	5 August 2008
19	121	Earthshock	4 × 25 min.	18 August 2003	1 October 2003	7 September 2004
19	122	Time-Flight (Note: Only available as part of the Time-Flight/Arc of Infinity box set in Regions 2 and 4. Only available individually in Region 1.)	4 × 25 min.	6 August 2007	5 September 2007	6 November 2007
19	116–122	Complete Season 19 (Note: Released as Doctor Who: The Collection – Season 19 in Region B. Released as Doctor Who – Peter Davison: Complete Season One in Region A.)	26 × 25 min. 1 × 30 min. 1 × 8 min.	10 December 2018 ^{(B)}	23 January 2019 ^{(B)}	4 December 2018 ^{(B)}

== In print ==
Season	Story no.	Library no. (Note: Number in Target's Doctor Who Library, if applicable)	Novelisation title	Author	Hardcover release date (Note: Published by Target's parent companies (Allen Wingate, W. H. Allen, BBC Books) unless otherwise indicated)	Paperback release date (Note: Published by Target Books (or by BBC Books under the Target Collection umbrella) unless otherwise indicated)	Audiobook	
Season	Story no.	Library no.	Novelisation title	Author	Hardcover release date	Paperback release date	Release date (Note: Unabridged from BBC Audio / AudioGo unless otherwise indicated)	Narrator
19	116	76	Castrovalva	Christopher H. Bidmead	17 March 1983	16 June 1983	4 March 2010	Peter Davison
19	117	77	Four to Doomsday	Terrance Dicks	14 April 1983	21 July 1983	2 March 2017	Matthew Waterhouse
19	118	84	Kinda	Terrance Dicks	8 December 1983	15 March 1984	4 August 1997 (Note: Abridged)	Peter Davison
19	118	84	Kinda	Terrance Dicks	8 December 1983	15 March 1984	6 June 2024	Janet Fielding
19	119	69	Doctor Who and the Visitation	Eric Saward	19 August 1982	19 August 1982	4 October 2012	Matthew Waterhouse
19	120	113	Black Orchid	Terence Dudley	18 September 1986	19 February 1987	12 June 2008	Michael Cochrane
19	121	78	Earthshock	Ian Marter	19 May 1983	18 August 1983	2 February 2012	Peter Davison (Note: Cyberman voices performed by Nicholas Briggs)
19	122	74	Time-Flight	Peter Grimwade	20 January 1983	14 April 1983	1 April 2021	Peter Davison
