= Time-Flight =

122 – Time-Flight
- Doctor Who serial

Cast
- Doctor: Peter Davison – Fifth Doctor
- Companions: Sarah Sutton – Nyssa; Janet Fielding – Tegan Jovanka
- Others: Anthony Ainley – The Master/Kalid; Nigel Stock – Professor Hayter; Richard Easton – Captain Stapley; Keith Drinkel – Flight Engineer Scobie; Michael Cashman – First Officer Bilton; John Flint – Captain Urquhart; Judith Byfield – Angela Clifford (Note: Also provided the Tannoy voice, uncredited.); Peter Dahlsen – Horton; Brian McDermott – Sheard; Peter Cellier – Andrews; Matthew Waterhouse – Adric; Hugh Hayes – Anithon; André Winterton – Zarak

Production
- Directed by: Ron Jones
- Written by: Peter Grimwade
- Script editor: Eric Saward
- Produced by: John Nathan-Turner
- Executive producer: None
- Music by: Roger Limb
- Production code: 6C
- Series: Season 19
- Running time: 4 episodes, 25 minutes each
- First broadcast: 22–30 March 1982

Chronology
← Preceded by Earthshock	Followed by → Arc of Infinity

Time-Flight is the seventh and final serial of the 19th season of the British science fiction television series Doctor Who, which was first broadcast in four twice-weekly parts on BBC1 from 22 to 30 March 1982.

The serial is set at the site of Heathrow Airport in the 1980s and 140 million years ago. In the serial, the alien time traveller the Master (Anthony Ainley) attempts to use the power of the psychic gestalt being the Xeraphin to power his damaged time machine.

== Plot ==
The Fifth Doctor, Nyssa, and Tegan, still mourning the loss of their former companion Adric, arrive at Heathrow and learn that one of their Concordes mysteriously vanished. Using another Concorde with the TARDIS aboard, the Doctor and his companions join Captain Stapley and his crew to fly the same landing path. They appear to land at Heathrow, but the Doctor determines they have flown through a time corridor to 140 million years in the past, the illusion of Heathrow projected by a powerful psychokinetic field.

The crew and passengers of the missing Concorde believe they are at Heathrow but are enslaved under guard of Plasmatons. One passenger, Professor Hayter, has seen through the illusion, and lets the Doctor know that they have been forced to work by the mystic Kalid to break into a central chamber at a nearby Citadel. Stapley and Hayter attempt to break the other humans free of the illusion, while Nyssa and Tegan enter the central chamber to find the power source controlling the psychokinetic field. Nyssa briefly interrupts the power source, which causes Kalid's disguise to falter, revealing himself to the Doctor as the Master. The Master explains that he had been trapped in Earth's past after their last encounter, his own TARDIS damaged, and believed that he could repair it by acquiring the power source in the Citadel. He created the time corridor to obtain human slaves to help break the chamber open. However, now with the Doctor's TARDIS in his possession, the Master takes it to try to materialise in the central chamber.

The Doctor finds that the humans have broken through the chamber, and he soon joins Nyssa and Tegan inside. They find that the power source is a gestalt intelligence of numerous Xeraphin. Their ship had crashed some time ago, and to survive against high radiation levels, they took the form of energy in the gestalt. The Master's presence caused the gestalt to develop a split personality, some willing to help the Master while others fight against him. The Master is unable to materialise the Doctor's TARDIS into the chamber but instead uses it to create an induction loop to transfer the gestalt to his TARDIS. On returning to his TARDIS, he finds that Stapley and Hayter have taken some of the key circuitry in their attempt to free the others, and he attempts to scavenge those parts from the Doctor's TARDIS. The Doctor proposes a truce, providing the spare parts including a temporal limiter, to repair the Master's TARDIS in exchange for dropping the psychokinetic field. The Master agrees, and quickly dematerialises when his TARDIS is ready. The Doctor ushers his companions and the freed humans to one of the Concordes, and uses his TARDIS to bring them back to the present at Heathrow. He reveals he programmed the temporal limiter to have the Master arrive later than they did, and thus is able to prevent the Master's TARDIS from rematerialising. Instead, as the Doctor had programmed, it will now rematerialise on the Xeraphin's home planet.

After saying goodbye to Stapley and the rescued passengers, the Doctor and Nyssa leave. Tegan races out of the airport as the TARDIS vanishes, upset at being left behind.

== Production ==
Episode	Title	Run time	Original release date	UK viewers (millions)
1	"Part One"	24:56	22 March 1982	10.0
2	"Part Two"	23:58	23 March 1982	8.5
3	"Part Three"	24:29	29 March 1982	8.9
4	"Part Four"	24:30	30 March 1982	8.1

The Concorde used for the production was G-BOAC, the flagship of the BA fleet at the time. The registry can be read from the radar screen in the ATC scenes. The other registry, G-BAVF, was not a Concorde, but a Beechcraft 58 twin-engined light executive aircraft.

Peter Davison has said Time-Flight was the biggest disappointment from his time on the series, stating it was a "very good story, but we had run out of money. We filmed the prehistoric landscape of Heathrow airport in Studio 8 [at TV Centre] with a model Concorde in the back of the studio. The monsters were bits of foam. We didn't do the story justice."

=== Cast notes ===
In order to hide the Master's involvement in this story, the first episode did not credit Anthony Ainley as the Master. Instead, the credits and Radio Times listed "Leon Ny Taiy" (an anagram of "Tony Ainley") as playing Kalid.

Although his character had been killed in the previous story, Matthew Waterhouse's contract extended into the filming of Time-Flight, which is the reason for Adric's illusory appearance in Part Two. Tegan's apparent departure from the series was never intended to be permanent, but was planned as a sort of cliffhanger-ending to the 19th season. She would later return in the second episode of the next story, Arc of Infinity.

Keith Drinkel would later play Henry Hallam in the Big Finish Productions audio play Catch-1782.

== Commercial releases ==
=== In print ===
Time-Flight
- Author: Peter Grimwade
- Series: Doctor Who book: Target novelisations
- Release number: 74
- Publisher: Target Books
- Publication date: 15 April 1983
- ISBN: 0-426-19297-4

A novelisation of this serial, written by Peter Grimwade, was published by Target Books in January 1983. An Audiobook of this novelisation read by Peter Davison was published in April 2021.

=== Home media ===
Time-Flight was released on VHS in July 2000. A double-pack DVD featuring both Time-Flight and Arc of Infinity was released on 6 August 2007. This serial was released as part of the Doctor Who DVD Files in Issue 135 on 5 March 2014.
