= Kinda (Doctor Who) =

118 – Kinda
- Doctor Who serial
- 2011 DVD cover for Kinda

Cast
- Doctor: Peter Davison – Fifth Doctor
- Companions: Matthew Waterhouse – Adric; Sarah Sutton – Nyssa; Janet Fielding – Tegan Jovanka
- Others: Richard Todd – Sanders; Nerys Hughes – Todd; Simon Rouse – Hindle; Mary Morris – Panna; Sarah Prince – Karuna; Adrian Mills – Aris; Lee Cornes – Trickster; Jeff Stewart – Dukkha; Anna Wing – Anatta; Roger Milner – Annica

Production
- Directed by: Peter Grimwade
- Written by: Christopher Bailey
- Script editor: Eric Saward
- Produced by: John Nathan-Turner
- Executive producer: None
- Music by: Peter Howell
- Production code: 5Y
- Series: Season 19
- Running time: 4 episodes, 25 minutes each
- First broadcast: 1 February 1982
- Last broadcast: 9 February 1982

Chronology
← Preceded by Four to Doomsday	Followed by → The Visitation

Kinda is the third serial of the 19th season of the British science fiction television series Doctor Who, which was first broadcast in four twice-weekly parts on BBC1 from 1 to 9 February 1982.

In the serial, an alien being from another plane uses the dreams of the time-travelling air hostess Tegan Jovanka (Janet Fielding) to reach the planet Deva Loka and takes over the body of the Kinda Aris (Adrian Mills) to attack colonists on the planet.

== Plot ==
An Earth colonisation survey expedition to the beautiful jungle planet Deva Loka is being depleted as members of the survey team disappear one by one. The three survivors are met by The Fifth Doctor and Adric. The team members have also imprisoned two members of the planet's native tribe, the Kinda. Sanders, the leader of the survey team, ventures into the jungle, leaving his deputy Hindle in charge. Hindle's will is enforced by means of the two Kinda hostages, who have forged a telepathic link with him. Hindle, who plans to burn down the jungle, places The Doctor, Adric, and the third team member, Todd, under arrest.

Sanders returns carrying a strange wooden box called the "Box of Jhana" which, when he opened it, had cleared his mind and left him a more contented and enlightened person. Using the box leads The Doctor to a group of Kinda led by the power hungry Aris. Panna, an elder Kinda, informs The Doctor that the chaos on Deva Loka is the work of the Mara, an evil being of the subconscious that longs for corporeal reality.

The Doctor and Todd find an emotionally wrecked and sleeping Tegan and conclude that she was the path of the Mara back into this world. They find Adric and the party heads back to the Dome, where Hindle has now completed the laying of explosives, which will incinerate the jungle and the Dome. Hindle is tricked into opening the Box of Jhana and the visions therein restore his mental balance. The two enslaved Kinda are freed when the mirror entrapping them is shattered. The Doctor then banishes the Mara from the corporeal world back to the Dark Places of the Inside.

With the threat of the Mara dissipated and the personnel of the Dome back to more balanced selves, the Doctor, Adric, and an exhausted Tegan decide to leave.

== Production ==
The working title for this story was The Kinda. This was the first story Eric Saward oversaw as script editor, though Castrovalva was broadcast earlier.

Nyssa makes only brief appearances at the start of episode 1, and at the end of 4, because the script had largely been developed at a time when only two companions for the Doctor were envisioned. When it was known a third companion would also be present, rather than write Nyssa into the entire storyline it was decided she would remain in the TARDIS throughout and be absent through most of the narrative. To account for this absence, Nyssa was scripted to collapse at the end of the previous story, Four to Doomsday. In this story, she remains in the TARDIS, resting.

== Themes and analysis ==
This serial was examined closely in the 1983 media studies volume Doctor Who: The Unfolding Text by John Tulloch and Manuel Alvarado. This was the first major scholarly work dedicated to Doctor Who. Tulloch and Alvarado compare Kinda with Ursula K. Le Guin's 1976 novel The Word for World Is Forest, which shares several themes with Kinda and may have been a template for its story. The Unfolding Text also examines the way "Kinda" incorporates Buddhist and Christian symbols and themes, as well as elements from the writings of Carl Jung.

== Broadcast and reception ==
Episode	Title	Run time	Original release date	UK viewers (millions)
1	"Part One"	24:50	1 February 1982	8.4
2	"Part Two"	24:58	2 February 1982	9.4
3	"Part Three"	24:17	8 February 1982	8.5
4	"Part Four"	24:28	9 February 1982	8.9

The story was repeated on BBC1 across four consecutive evenings from 22–25 August 1983, achieving viewing figures of 4.2, 4.3, 3.9 and 5.0 million viewers respectively.

Paul Cornell, Martin Day, and Keith Topping gave the serial a positive review in The Discontinuity Guide (1995), writing, "One of the best Doctor Who stories ever, astonishingly directed and written as a theatrical piece brimming with allusions and parallels. It's also got a direct and unsilly performance from Simon Rouse, and a thoughtful one from Nerys Hughes." In The Television Companion (1998), David J. Howe and Stephen James Walker praised the dream sequences, the "intelligence and sophistication" of the script and direction, as well as the main cast. They felt that these outweighed the more negative aspects, such as a plot that could be hard to follow and the unconvincing alien environment and snake. In 2012, Patrick Mulkern of Radio Times called Kinda "an imperfect gem", with some production shortcomings in an otherwise worthwhile story. He praised the guest cast and the "unusually adult psychodrama". The A.V. Club reviewer Christopher Bahn said that the strength of the serial was "the way it behaves like an experimental stage-theater piece", with the highlight being Tegan's dream sequences. However, he felt that a problem was that the TARDIS crew was "kind of sidelined ... and rather passive", with the Doctor merely reacting to events. DVD Talk's Justin Felix gave Kinda three and a half out of five stars, describing it as fun and interesting, though with its fair share of poor special effects. Ian Berriman of SFX gave the serial a positive review, highlighting its adult tone and the strong female roles.

== Commercial releases ==
=== In print ===
Kinda
- Author: Terrance Dicks
- Series: Doctor Who book: Target novelisations
- Release number: 84
- Publisher: Target Books
- Publication date: 15 March 1984
- ISBN: 0-426-19529-9

A novelisation of this serial, written by Terrance Dicks, was published by Target Books in December 1983.

In 1997, the novel was also issued by BBC Audio as an audio book, read by Peter Davison.

=== Home media ===
Kinda was released on VHS in October 1994 with a cover illustration by Colin Howard. This story was released on DVD on 7 March 2011, along with the sequel Snakedance in a special-edition box-set entitled Mara Tales. For this DVD release there is an option for the effect of the Mara at the end of part 4 to be replaced with a CGI version. This serial was also released as part of the Doctor Who DVD Files in Issue 93 on 25 July 2012 (minus any special features).

The serial was released on blu-ray in December 2018 as part of "The Collection - Season 19" box set.
