= K-9 and Company =

1981 Doctor Who spin-off

- Created by: John Nathan-Turner
- Written by: Terence Dudley
- Starring: Elisabeth Sladen
- Voices of: John Leeson
- Theme music composer: Fiachra Trench; Ian Levine
- Composer: Peter Howell
- Country of origin: United Kingdom
- Original language: English
- No. of episodes: 1

Production
- Producer: John Nathan-Turner
- Running time: 50 minutes
- Production company: BBC Pebble Mill

Original release
- Network: BBC1
- Release: 28 December 1981

Related
- The Sarah Jane Adventures; Doctor Who; K9

K-9 and Company is a one-episode television pilot, for a proposed 1981 television spin-off of the British science fiction television series Doctor Who. It features former series regulars Sarah Jane Smith, an investigative journalist played by Elisabeth Sladen, and K9, a robotic dog voiced by John Leeson. Both characters had been companions of the Fourth Doctor, but they had not appeared together before. The single episode, "A Girl's Best Friend", was broadcast by BBC1 as a Christmas special on 28 December 1981, but was not taken up for a continuing series.

"A Girl's Best Friend" is set in the fictional English village of Moreton Harwood in 1981. In the programme, Sarah and K9 investigate the disappearance of Brendan Richards (Ian Sears), the ward of Sarah's Aunt Lavinia (Mary Wimbush), in the wake of increasing reports of witchcraft.

Under a different production team, the overall concept of a Sarah Jane and K9 series did eventually come to fruition: The Sarah Jane Adventures (2007–2011), featuring both of these key characters and actors (though K9 and Leeson only appear in some episodes).

== Programme origins ==
The programme has its roots firmly in the desire of Doctor Who producer John Nathan-Turner to get Elisabeth Sladen back into the TARDIS. He wanted her to have the contract that was eventually awarded to Janet Fielding in late 1980. Nathan-Turner's preferred plan for the transition from Baker to Davison was to have Sarah Jane be along for the ride from Logopolis to the second story of series 19. However, Sladen had no interest in returning simply to reprise a role and function identical to the one she had left years before.

Meanwhile, Nathan-Turner was trying to figure out what to do about K9. The robot dog was very popular among children but was difficult to deal with technically and Nathan-Turner felt that it made the TARDIS crew almost overwhelmingly formidable. He decided that a child-orientated spin-off series with K9 might be just the thing. However, such a series would require a human as the lead, and his prime candidate for this role was Sladen. He pitched the part to the actress as a departure from what she had previously done: she would be returning as Sarah Jane Smith, but she would do so as the heroine and not just a sidekick. This offer Sladen accepted.

== "A Girl's Best Friend" ==
"A Girl's Best Friend"
- K-9 and Company episode

Cast
- Starring: Elisabeth Sladen – Sarah Jane Smith; John Leeson – Voice of K·9
- Others: Colin Jeavons – George Tracey; Bill Fraser – Bill Pollock; Nigel Gregory – Vince Wilson; Sean Chapman – Peter Tracey; Mary Wimbush – Aunt Lavinia; Ian Sears – Brendan Richards; Linda Polan – Juno Baker; Neville Barber – Howard Baker; John Quarmby – Henry Tobias; Gillian Martell – Lily Gregson; Stephen Oxley – P.C. Carter

Production
- Directed by: John Black
- Written by: Terence Dudley
- Script editor: Eric Saward, Antony Root
- Produced by: John Nathan-Turner
- Music by: Peter Howell
- Production code: LDL/D300A/72
- Running time: 50 minutes
- First broadcast: 28 December 1981

=== Plot ===
Sarah Jane Smith visits her Aunt Lavinia for Christmas, but when she arrives at her aunt's house, she finds that Lavinia has left early for a lecture tour in America and is disappointed by the prospect of another holiday without family. Lavinia's ward, Brendan Richards, breaks her moment of reflection on her aunt's sudden disappearance. After picking him up from the railway station, they return to the house and discover a large crate that has been waiting for Sarah for a number of years. When they open it, they discover a mechanical dog named K9. Upon activation, it tells Sarah that it is a gift from the Doctor.

Sarah goes into town to question the locals about Lavinia, and Brendan stays behind to test the capabilities of Sarah's new "pet". In town, Sarah discovers that Lavinia has become disliked by some because of her blunt letters to the local newspaper editors about a growing practice of witchcraft in the area. Brendan, meanwhile, is attacked while using K9 to analyse soil samples in Lavinia's garden. His attackers, George Tracey, Lavinia's gardener, and his son, Peter, are tied into the local coven. George flees, however K9 uses his laser gun to stun Peter before setting off in pursuit of George. Peter is pinioned and interrogated by Brendan, but makes his escape when Brendan goes leaves to see K9 accidentally destroying a greenhouse in his pursuit of George.

The next day, George sends his son out to kidnap the sleeping Brendan from the house. This time, Brendan's attacker is successful, stealing him out from under Sarah, who is elsewhere in the house, reading up on the local practice of witchcraft. Sarah is now increasingly suspicious of George believing he would have the opportunity to commit the crime. She therefore hides K9 in George's house. K9 quietly monitors the household, until he eventually listens in on a conversation that implicates George as a member of a coven. He also discovers that George intends to kill Brendan in an act of ritual murder.

When George leaves his cottage, Sarah is able to retrieve K9, who alerts his new mistress to the impending crime. She has no way to enlist the aid of anyone else in the town, because she can't substantiate her claim of overhearing the conversation without also then having to explain who and what the anachronistic K9 actually is.

Realising that she and K9 are effectively on their own, she tries to figure out how to stop the sacrifice. Using Lavinia's books on witchcraft, she and K9 deduce it must occur at midnight on the winter solstice, now just a few short hours away. The duo drive around the shire investigating all the churches. A few minutes before midnight, they finally realise that there's an abandoned chapel on Lavinia's property. They arrive just in time for K9 to use his blaster to stop the coven's Priest and Priestess from plunging a knife into Brendan's chest. Now stunned, the group's ringleaders are easily apprehended by the police.

Finally able to celebrate Christmas, Sarah receives a call from Lavinia. She's surprised that Sarah was worried about her, since she left instructions for her business partner to send Sarah a cable. As he turned out to be the High Priest of the coven, Sarah merely laughs and tells her aunt that she has a story to tell her about why that message never reached her. Meanwhile, K9 tries to connect with the human holiday in his own way, teaching himself to sing "We Wish You a Merry Christmas".

== Production ==
Episode	Title	Run time	Original release date	UK viewers (millions)
1	"A Girl's Best Friend"	49:56	28 December 1981	8.4

=== Cast notes ===
Bill Fraser previously appeared with Tom Baker and K9 Mark II in the Doctor Who story Meglos in 1980 and Colin Jeavons played Damon in the Patrick Troughton serial The Underwater Menace in 1967.

=== Theme music ===
"A Girl's Best Friend" featured electronic theme music, composed by Ian Levine and Fiachra Trench. The music was intended to be an orchestral score, but was instead arranged directly from an electronic demonstration arrangement by Peter Howell (who also arranged the 1980s version of the Doctor Who theme music).

=== Broadcast and production ===
The pilot was filmed on location near Cirencester, and studio shots filmed at Pebble Mill Studios, Birmingham with editing also taking place at Pebble Mill, however it was commissioned by BBC London Drama Serials (LDL).

The viewing figures for the pilot were strong, achieving a viewership of about 8.4 million Britons on its première. This meant that it attracted more viewers than the average episode of Doctor Who during John Nathan-Turner's era as producer.

Despite these above-average ratings, the show did not go to series. The proximate cause for this was a changeover in channel controllers at BBC One; Bill Cotton, who had approved the pilot, vacated his position soon thereafter. He was replaced by Alan Hart, who simply disliked the idea and the resulting product. Further episodes were therefore not commissioned. The episode was repeated on BBC2 on 24 December 1982.

== Reception ==
51.55% of Doctor Who Magazine readers participating in "The Mighty 200" poll liked K-9 and Company. The title sequence came first in TV's Top 5 worst title sequences as part of David Walliams' Awfully Good TV.

== Commercial releases ==
=== In print ===
K-9 and Company
- Author: Terence Dudley
- Cover artist: Peter Kelly
- Series: The Companions of Doctor Who
- Published: 1 October 1987
- Publisher: Target Books
- ISBN: 0-426-20309-7

A novelisation of "A Girl's Best Friend" was released under the title K-9 and Company, in October 1987, as the last of The Companions of Doctor Who series by Target Books.

=== Home media ===
K-9 and Company was originally released on VHS on 7 August 1995 by BBC Worldwide. It was then released onto DVD 16 June 2008 as a double pack with K-9's first Doctor Who story The Invisible Enemy by 2entertain.

K-9 and Company was re-released on DVD by 2entertain on 25 October 2010.

It was included in the Doctor Who: The Collection Season 18 Blu-ray set, as an extra remastered to HD. It is also available for streaming, along with other vintage episodes of Doctor Who, on the streaming service BritBox and on BBC iPlayer in the UK.

== Bibliography ==
- Pixley, Andrew (1992). Russell, Gary (ed.). "A Girl's Best Friend". K-9 and Company Archive Feature. Doctor Who Magazine. Vol. Holiday Special. Marvel. ISSN 0963-1275.
