= Castrovalva (Doctor Who) =

116 – Castrovalva
- Doctor Who serial

Cast
- Doctor: Peter Davison – Fifth Doctor
- Companions: Matthew Waterhouse – Adric; Sarah Sutton – Nyssa; Janet Fielding – Tegan Jovanka
- Others: Anthony Ainley – The Master/The Portreeve; Frank Wylie – Ruther; Michael Sheard – Mergrave; Derek Waring – Shardovan; Dallas Cavell – Head of Security; Souska John – Child

Production
- Directed by: Fiona Cumming
- Written by: Christopher H. Bidmead
- Script editor: Eric Saward
- Produced by: John Nathan-Turner
- Music by: Paddy Kingsland
- Production code: 5Z
- Series: Season 19
- Running time: 4 episodes, 25 minutes each
- First broadcast: 4 January 1982
- Last broadcast: 12 January 1982

Chronology
← Preceded by Logopolis	Followed by → Four to Doomsday

Castrovalva is the first serial of the 19th season of the British science fiction television series Doctor Who, which was first broadcast in four twice-weekly parts on BBC1 from 4 to 12 January 1982. It was the first full serial to feature Peter Davison as the Fifth Doctor. The title is a reference to the lithograph Castrovalva by M. C. Escher, which depicts the town Castrovalva in the Abruzzo region, Italy.

In the serial, the alien time traveller the Doctor is led into a trap when his arch-enemy the Master (Anthony Ainley) uses the mathematical abilities of the Doctor's travelling companion Adric (Matthew Waterhouse) to create Castrovalva, a town whose dimensions fold in on itself.

This was the first Doctor Who story not to air on Saturday nights. With Peter Davison taking over as the Doctor, the BBC chose to move the show from its usual Saturday night slot, where it had been since its launch in November 1963. For this new Doctor Who series, the show moved to airing two new episodes per week, on a weeknight prime time slot instead. For Castrovalva, it aired new episodes on a Monday and Tuesday evening.

== Plot ==
After his regeneration at the end of Logopolis, the Fifth Doctor is still weak, and his companions, Adric, Nyssa, and Tegan take him to his TARDIS. Upon arrival, the Master's TARDIS materialises in front of Adric before departing, leaving him in a supposedly dazed state. Inside, the Doctor is delirious but asks to be taken to the "Zero Room", a room cut off from the universe, to allow him to recover. Adric seemingly programmes the TARDIS to take them to safety, then follows the Doctor. In the depths of the TARDIS, the Doctor loses track of Adric, but eventually succeeds in replacing his clothes and finding the Zero Room.

Tegan and Nyssa discover a terminal on the TARDIS that describes how to use the machine. They discover they are travelling rapidly to a pre-set time and destination, "Event One", the Big Bang, a trap set by The Master. After seeing a brief image of Adric caught in a web attempting to warn them, the women manage to bring the Doctor to the console room in time for him to jettison a quarter of the TARDIS' mass to provide enough thrust to escape the gravity field. They soon discover that the Zero Room was part of the jettisoned mass, so with the help of Nyssa the Doctor builds a temporary coffin-shaped zero cabinet from the Zero Room's doors. Tegan discovers information on the town of Castrovalva, an ideal place for the Doctor to recover, and directs the TARDIS there.

In the forests outside Castrovala, Nyssa and Tegan have difficulties in transporting the Doctor, and become separated from him; the Doctor is captured by a ritualistic hunting party from the citadel, while the women are forced to climb a rocky cliff to reach its entrance. The Doctor is cared for by Shardovan, a librarian and academic, Mergrave, the town's physician and the elderly Portreeve, before Nyssa and Tegan arrive. After a night's sleep, they discover strange aspects of Castrovalva; if they go out of the town through any of its exits, they find themselves in a particular plaza in the town, and a tapestry in the Portreeve's rooms changes and reflects events of the outside world. The Doctor understands that they are trapped in a "recursive occlusion", and Castrovalva is fake. The Portreeve reveals himself as the Master, and shows them the trapped Adric in a web of electrified cables, whom he had kidnapped and replaced with a mathematically generated replica. The Master has been able to use Adric's mathematical genius to create Castrovalva as well as alter the TARDIS, creating the terminal on the console that led them here. Realising the true nature of Castrovalva's reality, Shardovan swings from a chandelier into the Master's web and destroys it at the cost of his own life, freeing Adric and causing Castrovalva to fall apart. Seeing all is lost, the Master flees to his TARDIS, which cannot escape the collapse. The Doctor and his companions flee from the town with the help of Mergrave, while The Master is trapped by the townspeople and is seemingly unable to escape as the town collapses in on itself. As the time travellers return to the TARDIS, the Doctor indicates that he has fully recovered from his regeneration ordeal.

=== Continuity ===
While he is still disorientated, the Doctor addresses Adric as "Brigadier" and "Jamie", Tegan as "Vicki" and "Jo", mentioning Romana, the Ice Warriors and K-9 as if they were in the vicinity, as well as adopting mannerisms or figures of speech characteristic of his four previous incarnations.

== Production ==
Episode	Title	Run time	Original release date	UK viewers (millions)
1	"Part One"	24:14	4 January 1982	9.1
2	"Part Two"	24:13	5 January 1982	8.6
3	"Part Three"	23:35	11 January 1982	10.2
4	"Part Four"	24:12	12 January 1982	10.4

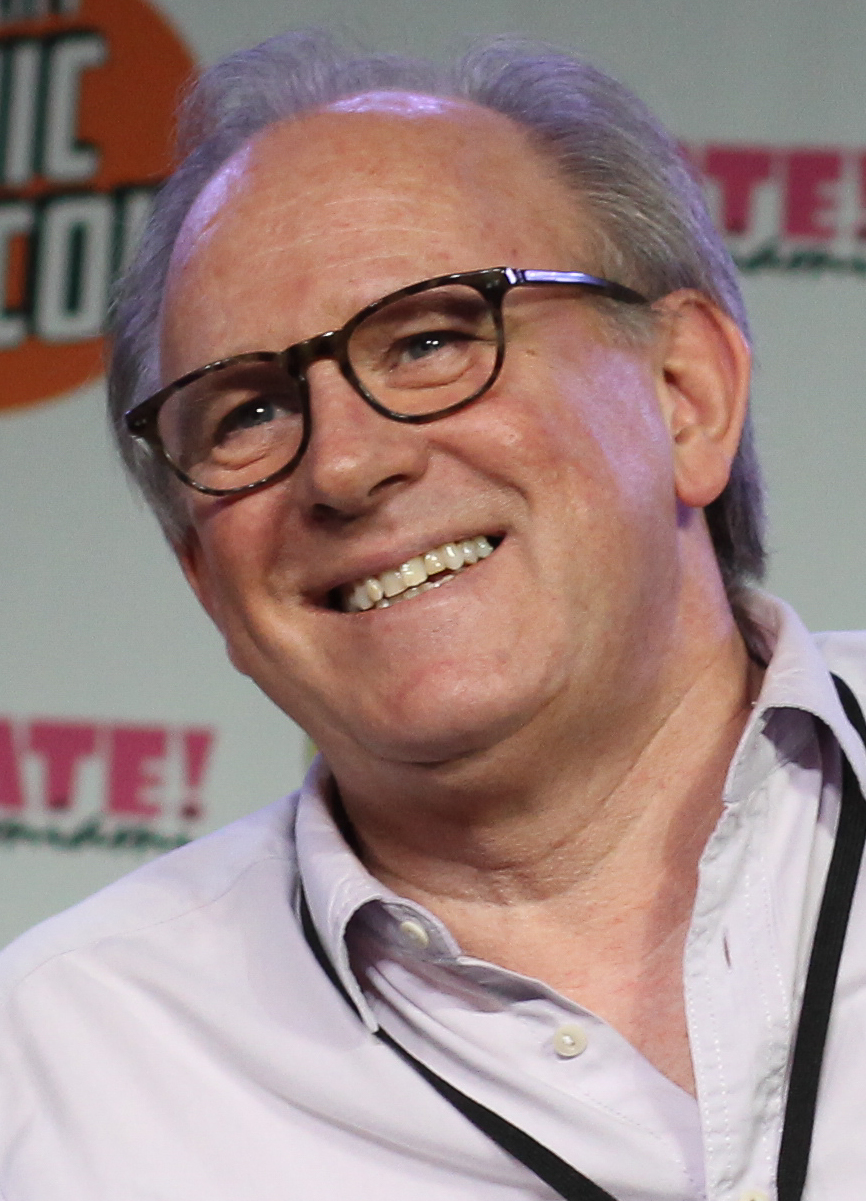
Actor Peter Davison makes his debut in this serial in the lead role as the Doctor

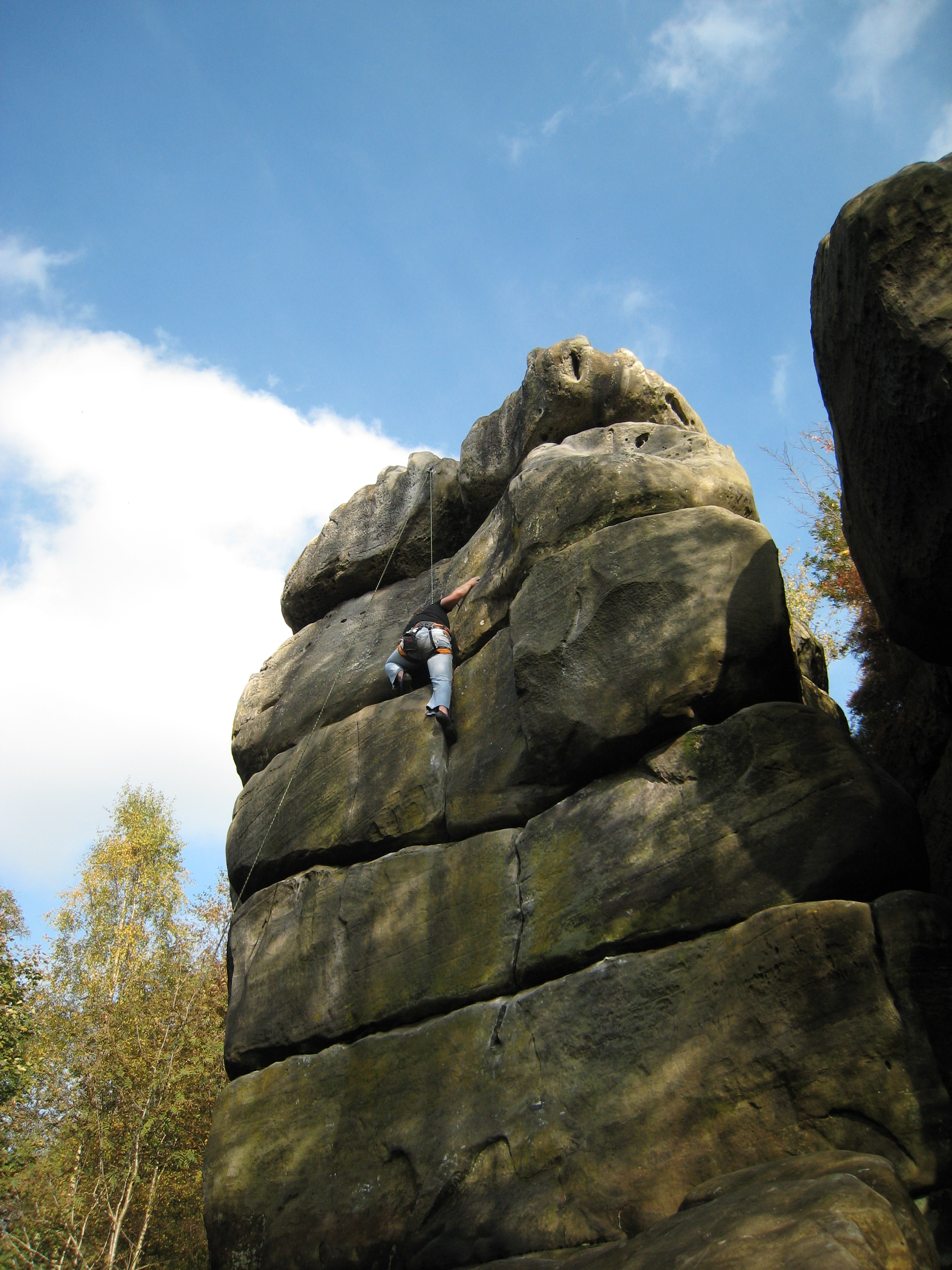
Harrison's Rocks in East Sussex served as a filming location for Castrovalva

The working title for this story was The Visitor. This story was the first story aired which featured Peter Davison as the Fifth Doctor. However, it was the fourth story to be recorded as the original planned debut story, Project Zeta Sigma by John Flanagan and Andrew McCulloch, proved unworkable and a replacement had to be commissioned. John Nathan-Turner took advantage of this to give Davison the chance to have a firm idea of how he wanted to play the role before recording the regeneration story.

Part 1 of this story is notable for being the first episode in Doctor Who history to credit the title character as "The Doctor", rather than "Doctor Who". The credit remained "The Doctor" until the series' cancellation in 1989, at the end of Season 26. In the 1996 TV film, no credit was actually given for the Eighth Doctor (although the Seventh Doctor was called the "Old Doctor" in the onscreen credits). For the first season of the 2005 revival, the credit reverted to "Doctor Who". The title became "The Doctor" again in "The Christmas Invasion" at the request of new star David Tennant.

Location filming for the forest outside the Castrovalva citadel took place in East Sussex at Buckhurst Park and Harrison's Rocks near Groombridge.

For the final scene, the script called for Adric to look "pallid" as he was still recovering from the effects of imprisonment by the Master. According to the commentary on the DVD, this was accidentally achieved by Matthew Waterhouse having a hangover. Davison says in the commentary that whilst the cameras were filming the Doctor and Tegan in conversation about who landed the TARDIS, Waterhouse "goes behind that tree and vomits". The other actors continued acting despite it so the take could be used.

Castrovalva opened season 19 with a revised version of Sid Sutton's starfield title sequence, which had been introduced for The Leisure Hive in 1980. The animated stars gathered into a constellation form, which morphed into a head shot of Peter Davison as the Doctor, replacing the earlier image of Tom Baker. The sequence also retained Sutton's neon tubing-style logo and Peter Howell's synthesizer arrangement of Ron Grainer's theme music. This title sequence was used throughout Davison’s tenure in the lead role.

For this story, the series was shifted from its traditional Saturday early evening transmission to a twice-weekly (Monday and Tuesday) slot.

=== Cast notes ===
In order to keep the Master's disguise hidden, in part 3 the role of the Portreeve was credited to "Neil Toynay", an anagram of "Tony Ainley". Director Fiona Cumming's husband Ian Fraser, later a production manager on Doctor Who, came up with the idea. Michael Sheard had previously appeared in The Ark (1966), The Mind of Evil (1971), Pyramids of Mars (1975) and The Invisible Enemy (1977), and subsequently appeared in Remembrance of the Daleks (1988).

=== Outside references ===
Castrovalva is the name of an early lithograph by the Dutch graphic artist M. C. Escher, and the design of the town in this serial reflects the impossible nature of many of Escher's later works. The story centres on the mathematical principle of recursion, a concept portrayed in much of Escher's artwork. Escher's lithograph depicts a town in Italy atop a steep slope, a setting similar to that of The Curse of Peladon (1972), but there is nothing in the print itself to suggest the paradoxes of this story.

"Event One" appears to be a reference to the Big Bang – the creation of the universe. However, it is repeatedly described in this story as "the creation of the galaxy", which is believed to be a gradual coalescing of hydrogen predating the first stars rather than a dramatic cosmic event.

== Commercial releases ==
=== In print ===
Castrovalva
- Author: Christopher H. Bidmead
- Series: Doctor Who book: Target novelisations
- Release number: 76
- Publisher: Target Books
- Publication date: 16 June 1983
- ISBN: 0-426-19326-1

A novelisation of this serial, written by Christopher H. Bidmead, was published by Target Books in March 1983.

An unabridged reading of the novelisation, by Peter Davison, was released on CD on 4 March 2010 by BBC Audiobooks.

=== Home media ===
Castrovalva was released on VHS in March 1992 (along with Tom Baker’s final story ‘Logopolis’). The cover, by Andrew Skilleter, in part drew upon the Escher print Relativity. The serial was released on DVD in the New Beginnings boxset on 29 January 2007 as part of a "Return of the Master" trilogy alongside The Keeper of Traken and Logopolis. The serial was released in issue 47 of the Doctor Who DVD Files, published 20 October 2010.

The serial was released on blu-ray in December 2018 as part of "The Collection - Season 19" box set. It featured optional updated visual effects.
