= Earthshock =

121 – Earthshock
- Doctor Who serial
- UK DVD front cover

Cast
- Doctor: Peter Davison – Fifth Doctor
- Companions: Matthew Waterhouse – Adric; Sarah Sutton – Nyssa; Janet Fielding – Tegan Jovanka
- Others: James Warwick – Scott; Clare Clifford – Kyle; Steve Morley – Walters; Suzi Arden – Snyder; Ann Holloway – Mitchell; Anne Clements, Mark Straker – Troopers; Beryl Reid – Briggs; June Bland – Berger; Alec Sabin – Ringway; Mark Fletcher, Christopher Whittingham – Crewmembers; David Banks – Cyber Leader; Mark Hardy – Cyber Lieutenant

Production
- Directed by: Peter Grimwade
- Written by: Eric Saward
- Script editor: Antony Root; Eric Saward (uncredited)
- Produced by: John Nathan-Turner
- Executive producer: None
- Music by: Malcolm Clarke
- Production code: 6B
- Series: Season 19
- Running time: 4 episodes, 25 minutes each
- First broadcast: 8–16 March 1982

Chronology
← Preceded by Black Orchid	Followed by → Time-Flight

Earthshock is the sixth serial of the 19th season of the British science fiction television series Doctor Who. It was first broadcast in four twice-weekly parts on BBC1 from 8 to 16 March 1982. This serial marks the final regular appearance of Matthew Waterhouse as Adric and his death, with the final episode featuring unique silent credits in loving memory of the character. It is also the first to feature the Cybermen since Revenge of the Cybermen in 1975.

The serial is mainly set on Earth and a deep-space freighter in 2526. In the serial, the Cybermen plot to wipe out Earth, where a conference of multiple planets is planning to form a military pact to defeat the Cybermen in a war.

== Plot ==
The Fifth Doctor, Adric, Nyssa, and Tegan explore a series of caves on future Earth. They are caught by soldiers led by Lieutenant Scott; Professor Kyle accuses the four of killing the rest of her archaeological team. Kyle leads them to the bodies of her team, and the group finds a hatch where they are attacked by androids. The Doctor suspects the androids were guarding the hatch, and opens it to reveal a planet-destroying bomb. The Doctor and Adric defuse the bomb and trace its signal back to a space freighter. Scott and Kyle join the Doctor as they travel to the freighter in the TARDIS. The Doctor and Adric are caught by the ship's security and taken to Captain Briggs, where they try to explain their situation.

Throughout this, the Doctor and the humans are being monitored by the Cybermen, who seek to destroy the Earth. The Cybermen leave the sealed containers they stowed away in and march to the bridge. They overpower the human's barricade, kill Kyle, capture Tegan, and take control of the bridge. The Cybermen set the freighter on a warp-speed collision course with Earth and install a device that locks the controls. They order the Doctor to take them to his TARDIS to escape, leaving behind Adric, Briggs, and other crewmen. Adric is able to pass the Doctor his gold badge before they depart, knowing the Cybermen are allergic to gold.

Scott and his men overpower the guard left on the bridge, and Adric starts undoing the control lock. His first attempt causes the ship to jump back in time about 65 million years. His second attempt brings the ship out of warp; though still on course to strike Earth. Briggs, Scott, and the remaining crew leave in escape pods. They try to convince Adric to come, but he has another insight on defeating the lock. Scott relays their status to the TARDIS, and the Cyber Leader orders the Cybermen to kill the TARDIS crew. The Doctor grinds Adric's gold badge on the Cyber Leader's chestplate, suffocating it and allowing them to disable the Cybermen.

The Doctor finds the TARDIS' controls have been damaged, making it impossible to rescue Adric. On the bridge, Adric nears undoing the lock when a weakened Cyberman fires on him, missing him and striking the keyboard, preventing Adric from making any further attempts. The TARDIS crew watches helplessly as the freighter collides with Earth in a massive explosion, killing the dinosaurs and Adric in the process.

== Production ==
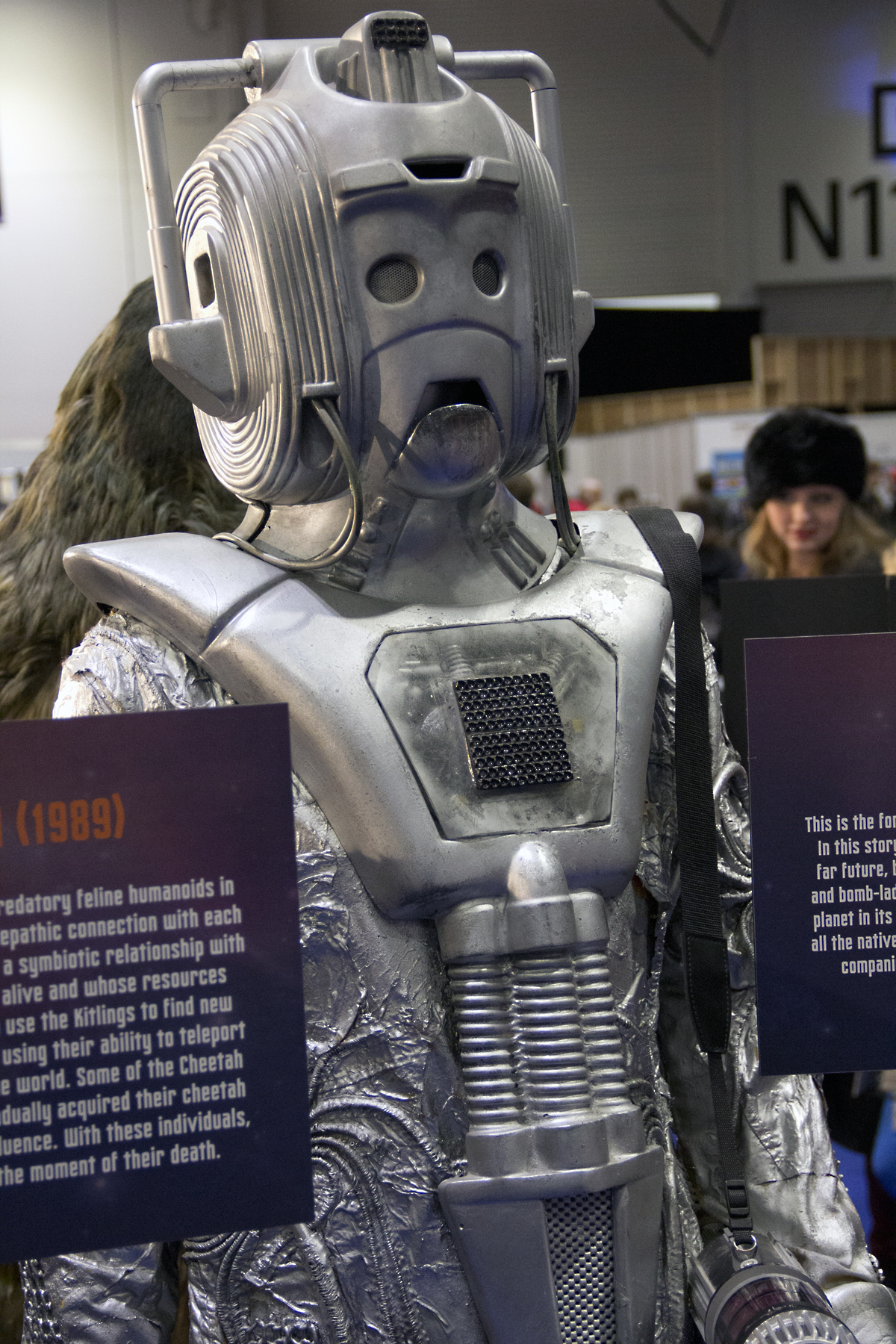
This serial featured newly designed Cybermen, on display here at a 50th Anniversary event

The working title for this story was Sentinel. Although credited as script editor, Antony Root in fact did little or no work on Earthshock. He was credited to avoid Saward, who had by this time replaced him in the job, being credited as such on his own work, which contravened BBC regulations.

This was the first Cyberman story since Revenge of the Cybermen (1975), as producer John Nathan-Turner wanted to bring back an old enemy, but resisted using the Daleks. Before the title was changed to Earthshock, Nathan-Turner was adamant about keeping the return of the Cybermen a secret. He instructed Eric Saward not to have any reference to the Cybermen in the story's title. Nathan-Turner even had the studio observation galleries closed for the duration of recording and turned down an offer from Radio Times to provide advance publicity of the Cybermen on their cover. The success of this convinced Nathan-Turner to continue to mine the series' past continuity for ideas and old enemies.

After the success of using archive footage for the flashback sequence in Logopolis (1981), producer John Nathan-Turner consulted with series continuity adviser Ian Levine and asked him to prepare another such montage for this story. Levine selected one clip from all of the previous Doctors, save for Jon Pertwee who never had a Cyberman story (though they had been briefly glimpsed in two serials from his era). Levine's selected clips were: the First Doctor from episode 2 of The Tenth Planet (1966), the Second Doctor from episode 6 of The Wheel in Space (1968) (with dialogue from the Earthshock Cyber Leader referring to The Tomb of the Cybermen (1967), at that time missing from the BBC archives) and the Fourth Doctor from part 3 of Revenge Of The Cybermen (1975). All the clips were presented in monochrome to preserve continuity, as the first two extracts were originally recorded in black and white.

The exterior sequences seen in the first episode were shot on Thursday 29 October 1981 at Springwell Lock Quarry, near Rickmansworth, Hertfordshire. The Cyberscope prop was built using parts the modelmaker (Martin Bower) had scavenged from the Nostromo set constructed for Ridley Scott's science fiction film Alien (1979). Similarly, the digital readouts on the device flash up a random series of numbers, which were also seen on the monitors of the Nostromo set.

Earthshock was Peter Grimwade's last work as a director on Doctor Who. According to an interview with Eric Saward in 1986, Nathan-Turner subsequently fell out with Grimwade and refused to use him again, which was a source of tensions between Nathan-Turner and Saward. Although this was his last job on Doctor Who as director, he would write three serials for the Davison era; Time-Flight (which follows on from Earthshock), Mawdryn Undead and Planet of Fire.

=== Cast notes ===
Peter Davison has stated that Earthshock is one of his three favourite serials from his time on the programme.

== Broadcast and reception ==
Episode	Title	Run time	Original release date	UK viewers (millions)
1	"Part One"	24:22	8 March 1982	9.1
2	"Part Two"	24:23	9 March 1982	8.8
3	"Part Three"	24:24	15 March 1982	9.8
4	"Part Four"	24:28	16 March 1982	9.6

The story was repeated on BBC One (not BBC Wales) as two 50-min compilation episodes in 1982 on 9 August 1982 & 16 August 1982 at 7.20pm as part of "Doctor Who and the Monsters", achieving viewing figures of 4.9 and 5.2 million respectively.

The story came 17th in the 1997 Doctor Who Magazine annual best serial survey. Rob Hill ranked it at number two in "the top 10 Cybermen stories" for Den of Geek in 2010, beaten only by The Tomb of the Cybermen (1967). In 2018, The Daily Telegraph ranked Earthshock at number 22 in "the 56 greatest stories and episodes", arguing that "Peter Davison's first season was unremarkable until Earthshock descended with a mighty thud". It continued, "Peter Grimwade's pacy direction keeps the action and tension levels high, and the Cybermen once again come across as a credible menace, backed by some appropriate marching music courtesy of Malcolm Clarke". The article concluded that it was "one of the most memorable stories of Eighties Doctor Who".

Paul Cornell, Martin Day, and Keith Topping wrote of the serial in The Discontinuity Guide (1995), "Exciting and engaging early on, but a writer is not supposed to get so caught up in the excitement that things happen for no better reason than plot expediency. What we have is great... for a first draft." In The Television Companion (1998), David J. Howe and Stephen James Walker wrote, "the story as a whole stands up very well and is highly entertaining". They felt that "deficiencies" in the plotting were not that noticeable. Howe and Walker called the first episode "a masterpiece of suspense and terror", praised the surprise return of the Cybermen, which they said were "more effective" than those in Revenge of the Cybermen (1975), and thought the way Adric was written out showed "the level of brilliance to which Doctor Who could still ascend if the production team put their minds to it". In Doctor Who: The Episode Guide, Mark Campbell awarded it eight out of ten, describing it as "a dynamically directed action story, much praised at the time; although the plot has huge holes and the dialogue is often lousy."

In 2011, The A.V. Club reviewer Christopher Bahn was positive towards how the serial characterised Adric, which set him up for his demise. Bahn praised the first episode for being "nicely tense and mysterious", but noted that it was separate from the rest of the story, which led to too many characters in the last three episodes. He also criticised the Cybermen, feeling that they did not hark back to their eerie emotionless roots and that when they got involved "the plot starts to bog down in its implausibilities". In 2012, Patrick Mulkern of Radio Times awarded it five stars out of five, praising the tension and describing it as "the most thrilling tale in years". He wrote, "Saward's script and Grimwade's direction work in unison, delivering pace, momentum, atmosphere and the eponymous shock." He praised the new look of the Cybermen, guest star Beryl Reid, and the way the story "pulls off the previously unimaginable feat of making us care about Adric". He acknowledged that critics had pointed out "plot holes and logic leaps", but said he was willing to "gloss over them".

In 2010, SFX named Adric's death the twenty-ninth best "tearjerker" in science fiction and fantasy, calling it a "tragedy" that managed to make the audience care about him. In 2012, the magazine also listed the scene as the third best companion departure, calling it "a beautifully constructed death scene" despite the fact that the character was "loathed by fandom". For Den of Geek in 2019, Andrew Blair wrote that Earthshock was "atypical Who with its short scenes, regular gunfights, and fast pace. Its success owed a lot to Peter Grimwade's direction, but also negatively influenced Doctor Who for the next four years with misplaced attempts to bottle lightning twice."

== Commercial releases ==
=== In print ===
Earthshock
- Author: Ian Marter
- Series: Doctor Who book: Target novelisations
- Release number: 78
- Publisher: Target Books
- Publication date: 18 August 1983
- ISBN: 0-426-19377-6

The Target novelisation of this serial, written by Ian Marter, was published by WH Allen in 1983. A second edition was published in 1992. An unabridged audio reading of the novelisation, read by Peter Davison, was released by AudioGo on 1 February 2012.

=== Home media ===
Earthshock was released on VHS in the UK in 1992. A DVD was released on 18 August 2003 as part of the Doctor Who 40th Anniversary Celebration releases, representing the Peter Davison years. The DVD included a commentary with Davison, Fielding, Sutton & Waterhouse, and a documentary, Putting the Shock into Earthshock, which included interviews with Davison, Saward and David Banks, as well as various fan commentators including future Doctor Who television writers Steven Moffat and Mark Gatiss, and Conservative MP (then Shadow Transport Secretary) Tim Collins. The Region 1 release followed on 7 September 2004. On 2 July 2007, this DVD was re-released with new outer packaging.

In 2013 it was released on DVD again as part of the "Doctor Who: The Doctors Revisited 5-8" box set, alongside Vengeance on Varos, Remembrance of the Daleks and the TV movie. Alongside a documentary on the Fifth Doctor, the disc features the serial put together as a single feature in widescreen format with an introduction from then current show runner Steven Moffat, as well as its original version.

In 2018 the serial was released on the Season 19 Blu-Ray boxset, including a new documentary, Earthshocked.

=== Tales of the TARDIS ===
In 2023 the serial was re-edited into a 90 minute 'omnibus' format and released as part of Tales of the TARDIS. It included newly filmed bookends with the Doctor and Tegan, as played by Peter Davison and Janet Fielding.
