= Black Orchid (Doctor Who) =

120 – Black Orchid
- Doctor Who serial

Cast
- Doctor: Peter Davison – Fifth Doctor
- Companions: Matthew Waterhouse – Adric; Sarah Sutton – Nyssa; Janet Fielding – Tegan Jovanka
- Others: Michael Cochrane – Lord Cranleigh; Sarah Sutton – Ann Talbot; Barbara Murray – Lady Cranleigh; Gareth Milne – The Unknown/George Cranleigh; Moray Watson – Sir Robert Muir; Ivor Salter – Sergeant Markham; Andrew Tourell – Constable Cummings; Ahmed Khalil – Latoni; Brian Hawksley – Brewster; Timothy Block – Tanner

Production
- Directed by: Ron Jones
- Written by: Terence Dudley
- Script editor: Eric Saward
- Produced by: John Nathan-Turner
- Executive producer: None
- Music by: Roger Limb
- Production code: 6A
- Series: Season 19
- Running time: 2 episodes, 25 minutes each
- First broadcast: 1–2 March 1982

Chronology
← Preceded by The Visitation	Followed by → Earthshock

Black Orchid is the fifth serial of the 19th season of the British science fiction television series Doctor Who, which was first broadcast on BBC1 on 1 and 2 March 1982. The serial sees the alien time traveller, the (Peter Davison), arrive in 1925, where he investigates the murder of two servants during a fancy dress party at an English country estate.

This story was the first adventure to feature no science fiction elements, other than the TARDIS and the regular cast, since the 1966 Doctor Who seriel, The Highlanders, though was not based upon any specific historical event.

== Plot ==
After leaving 1666, the Doctor assures Tegan, Nyssa and Adric that, despite needing to stop the Terileptils, nothing could have prevented them starting the Great Fire of London as a result. The group's discussion on the matter is soon halted, when the TARDIS lands at a railway station in Oxfordshire, near the village of Cranleigh, in June 1925. While exploring the station, the Doctor is surprised when a chauffeur greets him, stating that Lord Cranleigh is expecting him. The group decide to find out why, where the Doctor discovers he has been mistaken for someone else - a friend of Cranleigh he hoped would aid his cricket team win a friendly match. Despite the mistake, the Doctor helps out, winning the match to Cranleigh's delight.

Cranleigh invites the Doctor and his friends to Cranleigh Hall, as his guests for an annual costumed ball. Before the ball begins, the group are introduced by Cranleigh to his mother, Lady Cranleigh, family friend Sir Robert Muir, the Chief Constable of the county, and Ann Talbot, Cranleigh's fiancée - who looks identical to Nyssa. As the group prepare to get dressed for the ball, the Doctor admires a black flower. Lady Cranleigh reveals to him it is a black orchid - found by her eldest son George Cranleigh, a famed botanists, upon the banks of the Orinoco in South America. While Tegan, Nyssa and Adric enjoy themselves in the ball, the Doctor accidentally becomes trapped in a secret passage within the hall that he found.

In his absence, a mysterious, disfigured man, living in the Hall, steals the Doctor's costume in order to lure Ann away from the ball. When she realizes she is being kidnapped, the man knocks her out when she resists, before killing a manservant that tries to save her; they later dump the costume back in the Doctor's room. During this time, the Doctor ends up in another part of the Hall, and discovers a dead servant's body in a storage closet. Lady Cranleigh, accompanied by a South American called Latoni, finds him, whereupon she agrees to call the police; however, she instructs Latoni to search for the figure she had locked in a nearby bedroom. When Ann reveals what happened, the Doctor is accused wrongfully for the crime; however, Sir Robert arrests him for murder, after being alerted to the dead bodies, alongside Lord Cranleigh discovering the Time Lord was not the friend he had invited to the village.

The Doctor, seeking to clear his name, decides to show Sir Robert the TARDIS. Shortly after accepting the Doctor is innocent, Sir Robert receives an urgent call from Lord Cranleigh. When they arrive, Nyssa is abducted by the disfigured man - who had just killed Latoni and started a fire. Lady Cranleigh confesses to Sir Robert that the disfigured man is George - he was abducted by a South American tribe that revered the black orchid he sought on an expedition, cutting out his tongue and physically torturing him; causing him to be mentally scarred. He was later returned to England by Latoni, whose tribe found and rescued him; Lady Cranleigh kept him locked up, mainly because the sight of him would have been a shock to Ann, who was originally engaged to him. The Doctor manages to rescue Nyssa, convincing George he abducted the wrong person after revealing she is not Ann; however, George falls to his death when his brother tries comfort him. With the matter resolved, Ann gives Tegan and Nyssa their costumes as presents, while Lady Cranleigh presents the Doctor with a copy of George's book, which the Time Lord says he will treasure.

== Production ==
This serial was commissioned by producer John Nathan-Turner during a period when the series had no script editor. Nathan-Turner had originally considered directing this story himself, which would have made him the first producer to do so since Barry Letts during the early 1970s. However, due to time constraints, Nathan-Turner abandoned the idea and hired Ron Jones to direct.

=== Cast notes ===
Sarah Sutton was credited as "Nyssa/Ann" on-screen for both episodes, but was billed only as "Nyssa" in Radio Times.

To avoid giving away the plot surprise, Gareth Milne's character was listed as "The Unknown" for Part One and in Radio Times, and as "George Cranleigh" for Part Two.

Michael Cochrane, who plays Lord Cranleigh, also appears in the 1989 Seventh Doctor serial Ghost Light. He also appeared in the audio plays No Man's Land and Brotherhood of the Daleks. Ivor Salter had previously played the Morok Commander in The Space Museum and Odysseus in The Myth Makers.

== Broadcast and reception ==
Episode	Title	Run time	Original release date	UK viewers (millions)
1	"Part One"	24:56	1 March 1982	9.9
2	"Part Two"	24:41	2 March 1982	10.1

The story was repeated on BBC1 on 31 August and 1 September 1983, achieving viewing figures of 4.4 and 5.0 million viewers respectively.

In the DVD commentary, Peter Davison and Janet Fielding revealed that Black Orchid is not a particular favourite serial of theirs, because they disliked the lack of a science-fiction element and thought the script was generally trite.

Paul Cornell, Martin Day, and Keith Topping gave the serial a positive review in The Discontinuity Guide (1995), writing, "A little piece of 20s whimsy sampled into Doctor Who with surprisingly satisfying results." In The Television Companion (1998), David J. Howe and Stephen James Walker said that the story had high production values and were disappointed it did not lead to more historicals. In 2012, Patrick Mulkern of Radio Times praised the story's variation on the Doctor Who formula and the cast, especially Sutton, who was given more to do. The A.V. Club reviewer Christopher Bahn noted that the story was not realistic and paced in a way that not much happened in the first episode, but felt that this decision allowed for leisurely moments between the TARDIS crew. Though he wrote that the low stakes were a refreshing change, he said that the story's problem was its reliance on Agatha Christie-like source material and that it was "an interesting curiosity, but nothing more". DVD Talk's Justin Felix gave Black Orchid three out of five stars, describing it as "a breezy excursion into a melodramatic murder mystery".

== Commercial releases ==
=== In print ===
Black Orchid
- Author: Terence Dudley
- Cover artist: Tony Masero
- Series: Doctor Who book: Target novelisations
- Release number: 113
- Publisher: Target Books
- Publication date: September 1986 (Hardback) 19 February 1987 (Paperback)
- ISBN: 0-426-20254-6

A novelisation of this serial, written by Terence Dudley, was published by Target Books in September 1986. An unabridged reading of the novelisation by actor Michael Cochrane was released on CD in June 2008 by BBC Audiobooks.

=== Home media ===
Black Orchid was released in a twin VHS set with The Visitation in July 1994.

On 14 April 2008, it was released on DVD.

On 10 December 2018, it was released as part of the Doctor Who: The Collection - Season 19 boxset, which included an optional extended cut of Part One running over two and a half minutes longer than the televised version at a total of 27:32.

== Critical analysis ==
A book length study of the serial, written by Ian Millsted, was published as part of The Black Archive series from Obverse Books in 2016.

The serial was covered in volume 35 of the Doctor Who: The Complete History book series, which reprinted Andrew Pixley's 'Archive' features from Doctor Who Magazine and the various Doctor Who Magazine Special Editions, as well as new articles created specifically for the book.
