= The Visitation (Doctor Who) =

119 – The Visitation
- Doctor Who serial

Cast
- Doctor: Peter Davison – Fifth Doctor
- Companions: Matthew Waterhouse – Adric; Sarah Sutton – Nyssa; Janet Fielding – Tegan Jovanka
- Others: Michael Robbins – Richard Mace; Michael Melia – Terileptil Leader (Note: Also provided the voice of the injured Terileptil at the beginning, uncredited); Peter van Dissel – Android; James Charlton – The Miller; Neil West – The Poacher; Eric Dodson – The Headman; John Savident – The Squire; Richard Hampton – Villager; Anthony Calf – Charles; Valerie Fyfer – Elizabeth; John Baker – Ralph

Production
- Directed by: Peter Moffatt
- Written by: Eric Saward
- Script editor: Antony Root
- Produced by: John Nathan-Turner
- Executive producer: None
- Music by: Paddy Kingsland
- Production code: 5X
- Series: Season 19
- Running time: 4 episodes, 25 minutes each
- First broadcast: 15 February 1982
- Last broadcast: 23 February 1982

Chronology
| ← Preceded by Kinda | Followed by → Black Orchid |

The Visitation is the fourth serial of the 19th season of the British science fiction television series Doctor Who. It was first broadcast in four twice-weekly parts on BBC1 from 15 to 23 February 1982.

The serial is set in and near London in the 17th century. In the serial, a group of fugitive aliens called Terileptils plot to make the Earth their new home by spreading a deadly plague among humanity.

== Plot ==
The TARDIS lands in 17th-century London. Upon stepping outside, the Doctor, Nyssa, Tegan, and Adric immediately smell sulphur and head off to find the source. Richard Mace, a highwayman and self-proclaimed thespian, encounters the group and takes them to safety inside a barn. While questioning Mace, they find out that some kind of comet recently landed nearby.

The Doctor and his friends discover the "comet" was actually a spaceship inhabited by a Terileptil fugitive, who uses mind-controlling bracelets to subdue the local villagers. In a nearby manor house, they find a cellar full of caged rats and a device emitting soliton gas. The Terileptil plan to use rats infected with a genetically enhanced plague to devastate the population and conquer the planet.

Using the TARDIS scanner, the Doctor locates the Terileptil in London. The TARDIS rematerialises there and the five enter the building. With the Terileptil leader are two others, who get the jump on the Doctor and Mace. The Doctor manages to stop them, but the Terileptil leader's weapon starts to overload and detonates. The resulting explosion destroys the building and starts a raging fire. Mace stays behind to fight the blaze as the Doctor, Tegan, Nyssa, and Adric leave in the TARDIS.

It is revealed that the fire is at Pudding Lane, the location where the Great Fire of London started.

== Broadcast and reception ==
| Episode | Title | Run time | Original release date | UK viewers (millions) |
|---|---|---|---|---|
| 1 | "Part One" | 24:11 | 15 February 1982 | 9.1 |
| 2 | "Part Two" | 24:26 | 16 February 1982 | 9.3 |
| 3 | "Part Three" | 24:24 | 22 February 1982 | 9.9 |
| 4 | "Part Four" | 23:32 | 23 February 1982 | 10.1 |

The story was repeated on BBC1 across four consecutive evenings from 15–18 August 1983, achieving viewing figures of 4.3, 4.6, 3.6 and 4.8 million viewers, respectively.

At the time of original broadcast, the series as a whole was getting watched in 39 countries worldwide, with around 88 million viewers abroad and an average of 10 million in the domestic market.

The serial saw the destruction of the sonic screwdriver, marking the last major appearance of the device until the 1996 TV Movie.

Paul Cornell, Martin Day and Keith Topping gave a favourable review of the serial in The Discontinuity Guide (1995), writing, "A good, hearty action romp, crisply written and engaging, although critics might say that it's too straight-forward. There's only one proper character (Richard Mace), which gives Peter Davison and Michael Robbins the space to turn in a pair of lovely performances. The end result is a stylish slice of pseudo-historical nonsense." In The Television Companion (1998), David J. Howe and Stephen James Walker called The Visitation "a very enjoyable story, and one of the highlights of the season". They praised the location filming, but noted a weakness was "Matthew Waterhouse's peculiar performance as Adric". In 2012, Patrick Mulkern of Radio Times awarded it four stars out of five. He said that the story was "pedestrian in places, [but] Saward does execute one or two dramatic flourishes". He said that Davison was growing into the role and the companions were given something to do despite being "variable", and was mixed towards the design of the Terileptils. Reviewing the special-edition DVD release for SFX, Nick Setchfield gave The Visitation three-and-a-half out of five stars. He noted that it was a "throwback" and "built on capture-escape-capture storytelling, but it's brimful of oaky, shadowy 17th-century atmosphere".

Peter Davison stated that The Visitation is one of his three favourite serials from his time on the programme.

== Commercial releases ==
=== In print ===
Doctor Who and the Visitation
- Author: Eric Saward
- Series: Doctor Who book: Target novelisations
- Release number: 69
- Publisher: Target Books
- Publication date: 19 August 1982
- ISBN: 0-426-20135-3

A novelisation of this serial, written by Eric Saward, was published by Target Books in August 1982. Its cover was originally to be painted like the other Target Doctor Who novels, but an objection by Peter Davison's agent resulted in a photographic cover being used instead. This was the only Peter Davison story to have its novelisation titled as Doctor Who and the... in its original edition. An unabridged recording of the Target novelisation was released in 2012, read by Matthew Waterhouse.

A behind-the-scenes book following the production process of the story was printed by Andre Deutsch Limited in 1982, with text by Alan Road and illustrations by Richard Farley.

=== Home media ===
The Visitation was released on a VHS double pack with Black Orchid in July 1994. It was released on DVD-Video in the United Kingdom on 19 January 2004, and used material from the 16 mm film prints, which still exist in the BBC Archives. A special edition of the story with additional features was released on DVD on 6 May 2013.

The serial was released on blu-ray in December 2018 as part of "The Collection - Season 19" box set.

=== Soundtrack ===
Doctor Who: The Visitation

Soundtrack album by Paddy Kingsland and the BBC Radiophonic Workshop
- Released: 1 May 2020
- Genre: Soundtrack
- Label: Silva Screen

Doctor Who soundtrack chronology
| Doctor Who: The Sun Makers (2020) | Doctor Who: The Visitation (2020) | Doctor Who: Series 12 - Revolution of the Daleks (2021) |

BBC Radiophonic Workshop chronology
| The Stone Tape (2019) | Doctor Who: The Visitation (2020) | La Planète Sauvage (with Stealing Sheep) (2021) |

The February 2020 issue of Doctor Who Magazine announced that Paddy Kingsland's score for this serial will be released on CD and vinyl. Release date and track listing were announced on 1 May 2020

==== Track listing ====
All tracks are written by Paddy Kingsland, except where noted.

| No. | Title | Length |
|---|---|---|
| 1. | "Doctor Who 1980 (Opening Titles)" (Ron Grainer arr. Peter Howell at the BBC Radiophonic Workshop) | 0:40 |
| 2. | "Have you Seen the Sky?" | 2:44 |
| 3. | "Heathrow, 1666" | 1:55 |
| 4. | "Richard Mace & The Miller" | 1:31 |
| 5. | "A Fascinating Wall" | 2:06 |
| 6. | "An Incredible Illusion" | 1:27 |
| 7. | "Death in the Cellar" | 1:55 |
| 8. | "Activation" | 1:12 |
| 9. | "Grim" | 0:47 |
| 10. | "The Poacher and his Friends" | 1:25 |
| 11. | "Looking for the Miller / Not Again!" | 2:19 |
| 12. | "Trouble at the Mill" | 1:05 |
| 13. | "Laying a Trap" | 1:26 |
| 14. | "More Trouble at the Mill" | 2:30 |
| 15. | "Oh for a Proper Key" | 1:28 |
| 16. | "The End for us All" | 0:39 |
| 17. | "A Final Visitation" | 1:40 |
| 18. | "Almost Your Old Self" | 0:20 |
| 19. | "Eureka!" | 2:16 |
| 20. | "The Sonic Booster" | 4:05 |
| 21. | "Almost as if we were Expected" | 1:34 |
| 22. | "The Great Fire" | 2:22 |
| 23. | "Doctor Who Closing Title Theme" (Ron Grainer arr. Peter Howell at the BBC Radiophonic Workshop) | 1:19 |
| 24. | "Activation (Unused Version 1)" | 1:10 |
| 25. | "Not Again! (Unused Version 1)" | 0:37 |
