= Four to Doomsday =

117 – Four to Doomsday
- Doctor Who serial
- UK DVD front cover

Cast
- Doctor: Peter Davison – Fifth Doctor
- Companions: Matthew Waterhouse – Adric; Sarah Sutton – Nyssa; Janet Fielding – Tegan Jovanka
- Others: Stratford Johns – Monarch; Annie Lambert – Enlightenment; Paul Shelley – Persuasion; Philip Locke – Bigon (Note: Also provided the voice of Control, uncredited.); Nadia Hammam – Villagra; Burt Kwouk – Lin Futu; Ilario Bisi-Pedro – Kurkutji

Production
- Directed by: John Black
- Written by: Terence Dudley
- Script editor: Antony Root
- Produced by: John Nathan-Turner
- Executive producer: None
- Music by: Roger Limb
- Production code: 5W
- Series: Season 19
- Running time: 4 episodes, 25 minutes each
- First broadcast: 18 January 1982
- Last broadcast: 26 January 1982

Chronology
← Preceded by Castrovalva	Followed by → Kinda

Four to Doomsday is the second serial of the 19th season of the British science fiction television series Doctor Who, which was first broadcast in four twice-weekly parts on BBC1 from 18 to 26 January 1982.

The serial is set almost entirely on the spaceship of the alien Urbankan Monarch (Stratford Johns). In the serial, Monarch plots to invade Earth for its minerals using a deadly toxin to wipe out humanity so he can continue to make improvements to his ship.

== Plot ==
The TARDIS materialises on board a spacecraft. The commander introduces himself as Monarch, ruler of Urbanka, and his associates are the Ministers of Enlightenment and Persuasion. Monarch is intrigued by talk of current Earth civilization and reveals their ship is bound for Earth. Enlightenment and Persuasion assume human forms, dressed in garments Tegan designed to demonstrate contemporary Earth fashions.

There are four distinct human cultures represented on the vessel by a small group of humans: Ancient Greeks and their leader philosopher Bigon, Chinese Mandarins, the Maya peoples, and an Australian Aboriginal culture. Each from a previous time the Urbankans have visited the Earth. This time they left their homeworld with three billion of their species aboard their craft to settle on Earth.

The Doctor learns Monarch plans to conquer Earth with a poison that will be unleashed before the Urbankans disembark. He also learns that the humans aboard are the original people taken from Earth and converted into androids. The leaders of the peoples have been given additional circuits to help them reason, but this facility can be taken away.

Adric is rather taken with Monarch and tensions between him and the Doctor become strained. The Doctor sets about overthrowing Monarch and inciting a revolution with the androids. Enlightenment and Persuasion are decircuited, while Monarch himself is exposed to the poison. The humanoid androids decide to pilot the vessel to a new world, while the TARDIS crew departs. Back in the console room, Nyssa suddenly collapses to the floor in a dead faint.

== Production ==
Episode	Title	Run time	Original release date	UK viewers (millions)
1	"Part One"	23:36	18 January 1982	8.4
2	"Part Two"	24:11	19 January 1982	8.8
3	"Part Three"	24:09	25 January 1982	8.8
4	"Part Four"	24:53	26 January 1982	9.4

The working title for this story was Days Of Wrath. Although Castrovalva was the first story aired which featured Peter Davison as the Fifth Doctor, this story was the first in the season to be produced.

It was originally decided that after Castrovalva, the Doctor would only have two companions, Adric and Tegan. As a result, the character of Nyssa was to be written out of the series at the end of this story. However, Peter Davison strongly opposed this move because he felt that Nyssa was the companion who was "most suited to his vision of the Doctor". Given this, producer John Nathan-Turner and the rest of the production team relented and Nyssa was retained. The story for the following serial Kinda was already developed with two companions and Nyssa was not featured in that narrative as written. Rather than a complete rewrite of Kinda to include Nyssa in the narrative, she remains absent much of that serial, said to be resting in the TARDIS. This was set up with Nyssa's collapse at the end of this story.

=== Cast notes ===
Kwouk later played Doctor Hayashi in the audio play Loups-Garoux while Paul Shelley appeared in The Whispering Forest.

== Commercial releases ==
=== In print ===
Four to Doomsday
- Author: Terrance Dicks
- Series: Doctor Who book: Target novelisations
- Release number: 77
- Publisher: Target Books
- Publication date: 21 July 1983
- ISBN: 0-426-19334-2

A novelisation of this serial, written by Terrance Dicks, was published by Target Books in April 1983.

=== Home media ===
Four to Doomsday was released on VHS in September 2001. A DVD of the story was released on 15 September 2008. This serial was also released as part of the Doctor Who DVD Files in Issue 105 on 9 January 2013.

The serial was released on blu-ray in December 2018 as part of "The Collection - Season 19" box set.
