= Time Reef =

2009 British sci-fi audio drama

Big Finish Productions audio drama
- Series: Doctor Who
- Release no.: 113
- Featuring: Fifth Doctor; Nyssa; Thomas Brewster
- Written by: Marc Platt
- Directed by: Barnaby Edwards
- Production code: 6C/M
- Length: 90 min approx
- Release date: September 2008
- Preceded by: The Boy That Time Forgot
- Followed by: A Perfect World

Time Reef is a Big Finish Productions audio drama based on the long-running British science fiction television series Doctor Who. It is a three-part adventure, released with the single episode story that follows it, A Perfect World.

== Plot ==
The Doctor and Nyssa have returned to the TARDIS to find it missing various pieces of equipment and its dimensions unstable. Thomas Brewster refuses to explain where he has been since he "borrowed" the TARDIS and what has happened to it. Drawn by a distress beacon, the TARDIS crash lands on a time reef where the interior subsequently implodes, leaving the companions stranded. They need to find their way back to normal space.

Brewster originally stole the TARDIS in The Haunting of Thomas Brewster, leaving the Doctor and Nyssa stranded in Victorian London. They regain the TARDIS in the following story, The Boy That Time Forgot.

== Cast ==
- The Doctor — Peter Davison
- Nyssa — Sarah Sutton
- Thomas Brewster – John Pickard
- Commander Gammades – Nicholas Farrell
- Lady Vuyoki – Beth Chalmers
- The Ruhk – Sean Biggerstaff
- Lucor – Sean Connolly
