= Peter Grimwade =

British television writer and director (1942–1990)

- Born: Henry Peter Grimwade; 8 June 1942; Ayr, Ayrshire, Scotland
- Died: 15 May 1990 (aged 47); Maida Vale, London, England
- Education: University of Bristol
- Occupations: Television director and screenwriter

Peter Grimwade (8 June 1942 – 15 May 1990) was a British television director and screenwriter, known for his work as a director and writer of the BBC science fiction television series Doctor Who in the 1980s.

== Early life ==
From a young age, Grimwade became interested in drama and writing. He was educated in Cornwall and studied at universities in Wells (Somerset) and Bristol. At the latter, he completed a post-graduate course in drama. Joining the BBC in the mid-1960s, Grimwade first worked as a film editor in the cutting department before moving on to the drama department.

== Career ==
His first work in drama came with writing six episodes of police procedural series Z-Cars. At the same time, he was gaining experience in production as a production assistant. Grimwade first worked on Doctor Who in this capacity on Jon Pertwee's first serial, Spearhead from Space (1970). He occupied this position on a further five serials. He got his first chance to direct when he was asked to film some model shots for the serial The Robots of Death (1977) while the serial's actual director, Michael E. Briant, directed the rest of it in the studio. Tom Baker, meanwhile, used Grimwade's name to replace the scripted "Grimwold's Syndrome" illness mentioned in the script. Later that year, he completed the BBC's directors' training course and left the company in order to become freelance.

George Gallaccio, producer of The Omega Factor (1979), gave Grimwade his full directorial debut on the episode "Out of Body, Out of Mind" in the series. Grimwade was also around this time a production assistant on the BBC's All Creatures Great and Small (1978) and Tinker Tailor Soldier Spy (1979). After directing the Doctor Who serial Full Circle (1980) from John Nathan-Turner's first season as producer, Grimwade was given the task of directing Tom Baker's final serial, Logopolis (1981). When Peter Davison became the Doctor, Grimwade first directed him in the serial Kinda (1982) and then directed Earthshock, featuring the return of the Cybermen after seven years and the death of the Doctor's companion Adric.

Earthshock was the last time he was a director on the series. A year later, Grimwade was scheduled to direct the serial The Return (which ultimately became Resurrection of the Daleks (1984)). Industrial action initially prevented the serial from being filmed. When the story was postponed, Grimwade took the cast and crew out to dinner, but did not invite Nathan-Turner, because he had intended to take him out separately. However, Nathan-Turner felt slighted by the omission and refused to allow Grimwade to direct the story when it was rescheduled for season 21. The story was assigned to Matthew Robinson instead. Prior to this, Grimwade had written two serials, Time-Flight (1982) and Mawdryn Undead (1983), and had been asked to write Davison's penultimate story, which became Planet of Fire (1984). Because the story's requirements were in constant flux, mainly due to uncertainty over the filming location and cast changes, he eventually became frustrated and allowed script editor Eric Saward to finish the serial.

Although Planet of Fire transpired to be Grimwade's final work for Doctor Who, on 13 August 1984 he was commissioned by Saward to write a four-part story entitled The League of the Tancreds. The story was to be set in 1890s New York City, where the Sixth Doctor and Peri Brown would encounter an insectoid race called the 'Tancreds'. The story was abandoned on 18 November 1984 due to budget concerns. It was eventually adapted into a novel, Birthright, by Nigel Robinson, published in August 1993.

A short documentary about Grimwade's contribution to Doctor Who is included on the DVD for Kinda, which includes interview footage of the director from the 1980s. The feature would subsequently appear on the Blu-ray set Doctor Who, The Collection: Season 19.

=== Later work ===
After leaving Doctor Who, Grimwade wrote and directed The Come-Uppance of Captain Katt (1986) for the ITV children's drama series Dramarama. The play was about events behind-the-scenes on a low-budget science fiction television series, which Grimwade openly acknowledged was inspired by his experience working on Doctor Who.

When the BBC gave the publisher W. H. Allen the rights to use Vislor Turlough in the novel Turlough and the Earthlink Dilemma, W. H. Allen offered Grimwade a chance to publish an original novel. The result was Robot (ISBN 0-352-32036-2), a book filled with Doctor Who references.

After leaving the BBC, Grimwade mainly worked in producing industrial videos. He died in 1990 of leukaemia.
