= Project Zeta =

Project Zeta can refer to:

- ZETA (fusion reactor), an early fusion power research project
- The Zeta Project, a science fiction animated television series
- Project Zeta Plus, a proposed but unused Dr Who story arc also known as Project Zeta Sigma
