= Terence Dudley =

Television director, television producer, writer (1919–1988)

- Born: Terence Henry Dudley; 28 September 1919; West Ham, England
- Died: 25 December 1988 (aged 69); Taunton Deane, Somerset, England
- Occupation(s): Television director, producer and screenwriter

Terence Dudley (28 September 1919 – 25 December 1988) was a British television director, producer and screenwriter who worked on many programmes for the BBC.

Dudley produced the BBC science fiction series Doomwatch (1970–1972), and directed three of its episodes. He subsequently produced the series Survivors (1975–1977), also directing one episode, and wrote the script for the season three premiere episode, "Manhunt". His young son, Stephen, had a regular part in Doomwatch. Dudley also directed eight early episodes of All Creatures Great and Small, including the 1983 Christmas special.

He began an association with Doctor Who when he directed Meglos (1980) for John Nathan-Turner. That same year, he was asked to become producer of Blake's 7 after David Maloney was reassigned before it was known that a fourth season would be made. Dudley turned the offer down, as he no longer wished to work as a producer. The following year he embarked on a brief career as a screenwriter for Doctor Who. He wrote three serials for the programme—Four to Doomsday (1982), Black Orchid (1982) and The King's Demons (1983). He novelised the latter two stories for Target Books. He also wrote the script of K-9 and Company (1981), the one-off drama starring Elisabeth Sladen which was intended as a pilot for a spin-off series involving Sarah Jane Smith and the robot dog K9.

Dudley died after a long period of cancer on Christmas Day 1988.
