= John Black (director) =

British television director

John Black (born 9 May 1940) is a retired British TV director. Among his directing credits include Coronation Street, Play for Today, Crown Court, Doctor Who (the serials The Keeper of Traken, and Four to Doomsday plus the spinoff K-9 and Company) and The Bill.
