= Terence Greer =

Canadian illustrator

Terence Greer (24 September 1929, Surbiton – 5 July 2020, Vancouver) was an illustrator, playwright and scriptwriter who thrived in the cultural ferment of post-WW2 London. After graduating from the Royal Academy of Arts, he became known for his illustrations for The Radio Times and other outlets, his covers for Penguin Books, and his plays.

== Early life and education ==
Greer was born in Surbiton, Surrey, UK, and educated in private schools in Kew and Richmond. His mother took him often to the cinema, which he credits as a strong visual influence: "Being plunged into the world of James Cagney and the 30s American dreamworld strongly affected the way I saw things." Picasso's drawings were another important influence.

After leaving school in 1947, he did his National Service in the Royal Air Force. After 1949, he studied at Saint Martin's School of Art, Twickenham School of Art, and, for three years, at the Royal Academy of Arts.

A photograph of him as a young man by Lewis Morley, a contemporary and friend from Twickenham School of Art, "Terence Greer, Playwright, outside Gare St. Lazare, Paris, 1952", is held by the Art Gallery of New South Wales, Sydney, Australia.

== Career ==
=== Illustration ===
In 1953, his portfolio admitted him to the roster of the Saxon Artists Agency, a prestigious agency for professional illustrators, run by Barbara Thompson and Cara Strong. His illustrations appeared in a variety of publications, including The Listener, The Economist, New Society, and The Radio Times.

Before the coming of television, The Radio Times was an important outlet for a generation of creative artists such as John Minton, John Nash and Ronald Searle. Another contemporary, John Vernon Lord, commented that The Radio Times, a weekly, had so many readers "that it was like getting your work into the Tate gallery." Greer's illustrations appeared in two exhibitions, "The Art of the Radio Times" at the Victoria and Albert Museum in 1981-82 and "Artists of the Radio Times" at The Ashmolean Museum in 2002.

He is probably best known for his striking cover illustrations for Penguin Books, including for novels by Muriel Spark and Iris Murdoch. His drawings were bold and dynamic, as he aimed for an individual style: "There was also a sort of conventional thing amongst illustrators that you should never draw a figure with a gesture that suggested it was about to move. I didn't agree with that. . . . I always drew people just about to move". R.D. Underwood, the art editor of The Radio Times between 1950 and 1960, commented on Greer's ability to work in the tiny format required: "Even in such a space, Greer has been able to convey something of the setting and the tensions of the plot." Underwood also praised Greer's technical skill: "The original was done in Indian ink on blotting paper--a technique which clearly demands great sureness of touch and intention." Some of his work has been curated as a Pinterest site. In a related article, Tracy Prince recounts how it was built with Greer's collaboration.

=== Play- and Scriptwriting ===
As magazines replaced illustrations with photographs, he moved to writing plays. His first play, Ripper!, was staged in 1973 at the Half Moon Theatre in its first home, a former Whitechapel synagogue. Ripper! was musical version of the Jack the Ripper story, which was performed in a music hall setting a few hundred yards from the scene of one of the actual murders in 1888.

Other plays were performed at the Bush Theatre in Shepherd's Bush (Nobody Knew They Were There, 1975), the Mountview Theatre, now in the Mountview Academy, in Crouch End (The Lay Figure, 1975) and the Young Vic (Ballroom, 1978). Greer was commissioned to adapt a story, "The Psychrons", for the popular BBC series Doctor Who in 1981, but, like many other adaptations, it went unmade.

== Later life ==
After a period in Australia, where he continued to write, he moved to Victoria, British Columbia in 1993 with his wife, Sneja Gunew, who became a professor at the University of Victoria. She moved to a professorship at the University of British Columbia in 1995. He died in Vancouver in 2020.
