= Nyssa (Doctor Who) =

Fictional character in the TV series Doctor Who

- Doctor Who character
- Nyssa in her original "fairy skirt", used from The Keeper of Traken to Castrovalva
- First appearance: The Keeper of Traken (1981)
- Last appearance: The Caves of Androzani (1984)
- Created by: Johnny Byrne
- Portrayed by: Sarah Sutton; Lucy Baker (young; uncredited)
- Non-canonical appearances: Dimensions in Time (1993)
- Duration: 1981–1983, 1984, 1993

In-universe information
- Full name: Nyssa
- Species: Trakenite
- Gender: Female
- Occupation: Scientist
- Affiliation: Fourth Doctor; Fifth Doctor
- Family: Tremas (father); Kassia (stepmother)
- Home: Traken
- Home era: 1981

Nyssa is a fictional character in the long-running British science fiction television series Doctor Who. She is played by Sarah Sutton. Although Nyssa was created by writer Johnny Byrne for the single Fourth Doctor serial The Keeper of Traken, the production team subsequently decided she should be retained as a continuing character. Nyssa returned in the following serial, Logopolis, in which the Fourth Doctor regenerated, and remained as a companion of the Fifth Doctor. She was a regular in the programme from 1981 to 1983. Nyssa was a trained scientist with an expertise in bioelectronics and cybernetics. She is frequently referenced by female fans as a role model due to her intelligence.

== Character history ==
Nyssa is an aristocrat of Traken, the daughter of Tremas (a consul of the Traken Union) and stepdaughter of Kassia. She aids the Doctor and Adric when the Master wrests control of the Keepership by first manipulating and then murdering her stepmother, but is herself hypnotised and kidnapped by him after he takes control of her father's body. After being freed from the Master's control, she is brought to Logopolis by the Watcher and discovers that Traken has been destroyed as a side effect of the Master's tampering with the Logopolitan's formulae. She subsequently joins Adric and Tegan Jovanka as a companion and member of the TARDIS crew, and witnesses the Fourth Doctor's regeneration into the Fifth.

During her journeys with Tegan and Adric aboard the TARDIS, Nyssa finds herself trapped in a mathematical equation by the Master – whom she hates as he is now using her father's face. She also encounters a race of androids and their insane ruler, helps foil the genocidal plans of a wounded Terileptil and incidentally starts the Great Fire of London, and discovers her uncanny resemblance to a 1920s English socialite Ann Talbot.

Adric's death while battling the Cybermen affects the TARDIS crew deeply. When confronted by an illusion of him created by the Master shortly afterwards, both Nyssa and Tegan are initially taken aback, until Nyssa notices Adric is still wearing his now-destroyed badge. During this adventure, Nyssa also displays a previously unseen psychic ability when she is contacted by the Xeraphin.

After Tegan is accidentally left at Heathrow at the end of the events in Time Flight, Nyssa travels alone with the Doctor for an unspecified period.

Nyssa and the Doctor are reunited with Tegan while fighting Omega in Amsterdam and on Gallifrey. Later, they help Tegan battle her inner demons (personified by the Mara), and in the events of Mawdryn Undead they meet the Doctor's old friend and ally Brigadier Lethbridge-Stewart. It is during this adventure that the TARDIS crew adopts Turlough, an alien posing as a pupil at an English boarding school, who has secretly entered into a bargain with the Black Guardian to assassinate the Doctor. His interference with the TARDIS infrastructure destabilises it and it locks onto a seemingly derelict space station, Terminus, separating Nyssa from the others. Nyssa's adventures with the Doctor come to an end here, as – to Tegan's horror – she elects to stay to help free the enslaved guards and turn the station into a real hospital. The Doctor is moved by this noble gesture and parts saying that he thinks she is very brave. Nyssa's deep affection for the Doctor is demonstrated at this point when she kisses the Doctor goodbye.

The Fifth Doctor hallucinates Nyssa warning him not to die during his regeneration at the end of The Caves of Androzani and the character appears alongside the Fifth Doctor and Peri Brown in the 1993 charity special Dimensions in Time.

Nyssa is last mentioned by the Tenth Doctor in the 2007 Children in Need episode "Time Crash" when he asks his Fifth incarnation where he is in his own relative timeline.

A 2020 short published to the official Doctor Who YouTube channel and titled Farewell, Sarah Jane, written by former Doctor Who showrunner Russell T. Davies, revealed that Nyssa was in a relationship with fellow traveler Tegan Jovanka.

== Appearances in other media ==
Although Nyssa's fate after the TARDIS is not certain, the spin-off novel Asylum by Peter Darvill-Evans, relates that she left Terminus and settled down as an academic in a university on an unspecified planet. In Asylum, Nyssa encounters the Fourth Doctor from a time before he met her while he is investigating a historical anomaly. This meeting leaves the Doctor with the knowledge that he will have to be extremely careful dealing with Nyssa when he eventually meets her younger self to avoid changing history.

Since then Nyssa has appeared in several audio plays, still voiced by Sarah Sutton alongside Peter Davison as the Fifth Doctor, produced by Big Finish Productions. Primeval, set in Traken's past, provides an explanation for Nyssa's sudden collapse at the end of Four to Doomsday and her apparent development of psychic abilities in Time-Flight, as she was manipulated by an ancient entity that ruled Traken in the distant past as part of a complex plan to trick the Doctor into giving him access to the Source. Other stories in this time frame include new temporary companions Thomas Brewster and Hannah Bartholemew. The 'Winter' segment of Circular Time, by Paul Cornell and Mike Maddox, is set some years after Asylum and shows her with a husband, Lasarti, and a baby daughter, Nica. In Heroes of Sontar, Nyssa tells Tegan that she has two children named Adric and Tegan (although it is later confirmed that she mis-identified her daughter's name as she was delirious due to infection with a biological weapon).

When she sees the regenerating Fifth Doctor in her dreams and believes this may be the last time she sees him, Nyssa accepts that he is still travelling and having adventures somewhere. However, fifty years after leaving them, Nyssa meets the Doctor, Tegan and Turlough (a short while after they left her from their perspective) in Cobwebs. She begins travelling with them again to research a cure for a lethal plague, which was deliberately engineered to be more dangerous so that a corporation could provide the engineered cure; a chain of events leave Nyssa with a valid sample of the cure for the virus in its early stages, but this sample will not treat the mutated strain that is currently active in her time over twenty years later. In the course of her travels Nyssa is physically de-aged back to the same age she was when she originally left the crew (The Emerald Tiger).

In Prisoners of Fate, the TARDIS is drawn to a planet where the Doctor's original TARDIS (the Type 50 he owned on Gallifrey before he stole the familiar Type 40 on impulse to leave the planet) has crash-landed, and the crew end up meeting Nyssa's son, Adric, over two decades after Nyssa resumed her travels with the Doctor, preventing her from simply picking up her life once again now that she knows she didn't go back. Nyssa and her son are able to combine their research to cure the plague, with Nyssa's cure for the original disease being mapped onto the research Adric has undertaken of how the virus subsequently mutated, but Nyssa is prevented from reuniting with Adric when the TARDIS is caught in a CVE while en route to the next planet and is sent back to E-space. Nyssa ultimately sacrifices her own chance to escape so that her fellow travelers can return home, remaining in E-Space to power the equipment needed to open a final portal back to N-Space that the TARDIS can travel through. The audio ends with Nyssa, now an old woman, tending a garden in E-Space after spending the last decade teaching others how to treat the sick, observing that E-Space is showing new signs of life after the Doctor expressed concern that this world would only have a few centuries of life left.

Nyssa appears in the Short Trips audio "A Heart on Both Sides", where she is depicted running a medical ship during the Time War, unknowingly aided in her efforts by the Eighth Doctor (who assists Nyssa under the alias of 'Doctor Foster' to avert a rumour he heard in the future of a ship matching the description of Nyssa's being destroyed).

== List of appearances ==
=== Television ===
Season 18

- The Keeper of Traken
- Logopolis (Parts 2–4)

Season 19

- Castrovalva
- Four to Doomsday
- Kinda (Parts 1 & 4)
- The Visitation
- Black Orchid
- Earthshock
- Time-Flight

Season 20

- Arc of Infinity
- Snakedance
- Mawdryn Undead
- Terminus

Season 21

- The Caves of Androzani (cameo in part 4)

30th anniversary special

- Dimensions in Time

=== Audio dramas ===
Doctor Who: The Monthly Adventures

- The Land of the Dead
- Winter for the Adept
- The Mutant Phase
- Primeval
- Spare Parts
- Creatures of Beauty
- The Game
- Circular Time
- Renaissance of the Daleks
- The Haunting of Thomas Brewster
- The Boy That Time Forgot
- Time Reef / A Perfect World
- Castle of Fear
- The Eternal Summer
- Plague of the Daleks
- Cobwebs
- The Whispering Forest
- The Cradle of the Snake
- The Demons of Red Lodge and Other Stories
- Heroes of Sontar
- Kiss of Death
- Rat Trap
- The Emerald Tiger
- The Jupiter Conjunction
- The Butcher of Brisbane
- 1001 Nights
- Eldrad Must Die!
- The Lady of Mercia
- Prisoners of Fate
- 1963: Fanfare for the Common Men
- Moonflesh
- Tomb Ship
- Masquerade
- Mistfall
- Equilibrium
- The Entropy Plague
- The Waters of Amsterdam
- Aquitaine
- The Peterloo Massacre
- The Star Men
- The Contingency Club
- Zaltys
- Alien Heart / Dalek Soul
- Kingdom of Lies
- Ghost Walk
- Serpent in the Silver Mask
- Tartarus
- Interstitial / Feast of Fear
- Warzone / Conversion
- Madquake

Doctor Who: The Lost Stories

- The Elite
- Hexagora
- The Children of Seth

Doctor Who: The Fifth Doctor Adventures

- Return to the Web Planet
- The Fifth Doctor Box Set
  - Psychodrome
  - Iterations of I
- The Lost Resort and Other Stories
  - The Lost Resort
  - The Perils of Nellie Bly
  - Nightmare of the Daleks
- Forty 1
  - Secrets of Telos
  - God of War
- Forty 2
  - The Auton Infinity
- Conflicts of Interest
  - Friendly Fire
  - The Edge of the War
- In the Night
  - Pursuit of the Nightjar
  - Resistor
- The Dream Team
  - The Merfolk Murders
  - Dream Team

Doctor Who: Novel Adaptations

- Cold Fusion
- Goth Opera

Doctor Who: Special Releases

- The Five Companions
- Destiny of the Doctor: Smoke and Mirrors
- The Light at the End

Doctor Who: The Companion Chronicles

- The Darkening Eye

Doctor Who: Short Trips

- The Deep
- Seven to One
- The Lions of Trafalgar
- The King of the Dead
- The Toy
- Gardens of the Dead
- The Monkey House
- A Heart on Both Sides
- The Ingenious Adric of Alzarius
- The Mistpuddle Murders
- The Second Oldest Question
- Downward Spiral

The War Master

- Killing Time
  - The Orphan

=== Novels ===
Virgin Missing Adventures

- Goth Opera by Paul Cornell
- The Sands of Time by Justin Richards
- Cold Fusion by Lance Parkin (also features the Seventh Doctor, Roz Forrester and Chris Cwej)

Past Doctor Adventures

- Zeta Major by Simon Messingham
- Divided Loyalties by Gary Russell
- Asylum by Peter Darvill-Evans (features Nyssa after she left the Fifth Doctor and an early version of the Fourth Doctor)
- Fear of the Dark by Trevor Baxendale
- Empire of Death by David Bishop

=== Short stories ===
- "Lackaday Express" by Paul Cornell (Decalog)
- "Lonely Days" by Daniel Blythe (Decalog 2: Lost Property)
- "Past Reckoning" by Jackie Marshall (Decalog 3: Consequences)
- "The Parliament of Rats" by Daniel O'Mahony (Short Trips)
- "The Eternity Contract" by Steve Lyons (More Short Trips)
- "Hearts of Stone" by Steve Lyons (Short Trips: Companions)
- "Soul Mate" by David Bailey (Short Trips: A Universe of Terrors)
- "Confabula" by Ian Potter (Short Trips: The Muses)
- "No Exit" by Kate Orman (Short Trips: Steel Skies)
- "The Immortals" by Simon Guerrier (Short Trips: Past Tense)
- "Not So Much a Programme, More a Way of Life" by Anthony Keetch (Short Trips: Monsters)
- "In the TARDIS: Christmas Day" by Val Douglas (Short Trips: A Christmas Treasury)
- "The 57th" by John Binns (Short Trips: Seven Deadly Sins)
- "Saturn" by Alison Lawson (Short Trips: The Solar System)
- "The Church of Saint Sebastian" by Robert Smith (Short Trips: The History of Christmas)
- "Goths and Robbers" by Diane Duane (Short Trips: The Quality of Leadership)
- "God Send Me Well to Keep" by Linnea Dodson (Short Trips: The Quality of Leadership)
- "Tweaker" by Dan Abnett (Short Trips: Transmissions)

=== Comics ===
- "On The Planet Isopterus" by Glenn Rix (Doctor Who Annual 1983)
- "Blood Invocation" by Paul Cornell and John Ridgway (Doctor Who Magazine Yearbook 1995)
