= Antony Root =

British television executive

- Born: Antony Howard Root
- Occupations: Television executive and producer
- Notable work: Doctor Who

Antony Root is a British television executive and producer. He has worked in the United Kingdom, Europe and the United States. He was formerly Executive Vice President of Original Programming and Production for HBO Europe and Head of Original Production for WarnerMedia EMEA. He retired from this position in March 2023.

== Education ==
Root was educated at King's College School, Cambridge, Marlborough College and Christ's College, Cambridge, where he read philosophy and English. At Cambridge he was president of the Amateur Dramatic Club (CUADC) and junior treasurer of the Footlights revue group.

== Career ==
After a brief career in theatre management, Root joined the BBC television drama Series and Serials Department as an assistant floor manager. He was subsequently promoted to become a script editor, working on season 19 of Doctor Who (credited on the serials Four to Doomsday, The Visitation and Earthshock, broadcast in 1982), The Chinese Detective (1981–82) and Strangers and Brothers (1984).

In 1984 he was recruited by Euston Films, a subsidiary of Thames Television, as its development executive, where his credits included Capital City, Bellman and True and the miniseries The Fear, which he also co-produced.

In 1989 he joined Working Title Television as head of production, where he produced Lorna Doone (ITV), Derek Jarman's Edward II (BBC) and Armistead Maupin's Tales of the City (C4).

In 1994 he was appointed head of drama at Thames Television, executive producing John Schlesinger's Cold Comfort Farm (BBC) and setting up Five's first drama series, A Wing and a Prayer, before leaving to join Granada Television as Head of Drama in 1997. In this role his credits as executive producer included The Grand (ITV) and Far from the Madding Crowd (ITV).

In 1998 he became the first Granada executive tasked with developing and producing drama for broadcasters outside the United Kingdom. As head of international drama, he oversaw three movies for A&E in the United States – Murder in a Small Town and The Lady in Question, both starring Gene Wilder, and Dash and Lilly, starring Sam Shepard and Judy Davis. He also developed and executive produced the BAFTA-winning miniseries Longitude (C4) for Granada Film.

In 1999 he transferred to Los Angeles and assumed the additional role of SVP, movies and miniseries at Granada Entertainment USA, where his credits as executive producer included The Great Gatsby (A&E) and Princess of Thieves (ABC). In 2000 he was appointed president of the company overseeing all its output including the television movies My Beautiful Son (Showtime/ITV) and Second Nature (TNT), the second season of the series Beggars and Choosers (Showtime), and drama and comedy television pilots for the U.S. networks.

In 2005 he returned to the UK to take up the position of senior vice-president, European production, for Sony Pictures Television. In this role, which he held until December 2009, he was responsible for all development and production in the European region including the management of its wholly owned and joint venture entities in six countries.

From January 2010 to October 2011 he worked as an international consultant and executive producer. His assignments included serving as director of Industry Week at the RomaFictionFest in 2010 and 2011.

In October 2011 he took up the position of executive vice-president, original programming and production, at HBO Europe. In this role he headed HBO Europe's original programming division with direct reports in London, Copenhagen and Madrid and operating departments in Warsaw, Prague, Budapest and Bucharest. He was responsible for the creative, production and financial supervision of all HBO Europe original programming and for the selection of fiction and documentary programmes to be developed and produced. He was a member of HBO Europe's senior management team and reported to the CEO.

In 2020 Root was appointed Head of Original Production for WarnerMedia EMEA. In this expanded role he continued to oversee the original programming output of HBO Europe with added responsibilities for the original productions commissioned by the Turner channels in Spain, Germany and France and by HBO Max across EMEA. He retired from this position in March 2023.

Productions with which Root has been associated as producer or executive producer have won BAFTA, Peabody and Banff awards, as well as many local awards in HBO Europe and HBO Max's operating regions, and have been nominated for European Film Awards, Primetime Emmys, Golden Globes and Oscars.

Preceded by Christopher H. Bidmead	Doctor Who Script Editor; 1982	Succeeded by Eric Saward
