= Ron Jones (television director) =

British television director (1945–1993)

- Born: 6 August 1945; Bristol, England
- Died: 9 July 1993 (aged 47)
- Occupation: Television director

Ron Jones (6 August 1945 – 9 July 1993) was a British television director.

Born in Bristol, he joined the BBC as a studio manager in local radio then became an assistant floor manager on television. After a period as a researcher and item director on Blue Peter he worked as a production manager on series such as Bergerac and Secret Army.

On completing the BBC's internal director's course, he was commissioned to direct for Doctor Who and contributed six stories in the 1980s: Black Orchid, Time-Flight, Arc of Infinity, Frontios, Vengeance on Varos and Mindwarp.

He also directed Lindenstraße (a 1985 TV series) and episodes of police drama Juliet Bravo.
