= Adric =

Fictional character from Doctor Who

- Doctor Who character
- First appearance: Full Circle (1980)
- Last appearance: The Caves of Androzani (1984)
- Portrayed by: Matthew Waterhouse; Andrew Sachs (one Big Finish production)
- Duration: 1980–1982, 1984

In-universe information
- Full name: Adric
- Species: Alzarian
- Affiliation: Fourth Doctor; Fifth Doctor
- Family: Varsh (brother; deceased)
- Home: Alzarius

Adric (/ˈæ.drɪk/, A-drick) is a fictional character played by Matthew Waterhouse in the long-running British science fiction television series Doctor Who. He was a young native of the planet Alzarius, which exists in the parallel universe of E-Space. A companion of the Fourth and Fifth Doctors, he was a regular in the programme from 1980 to 1982 and appeared in 11 stories (40 episodes).

== Character history ==
Adric first appears in the Fourth Doctor serial Full Circle. Attempting to escape from the mistfall threatening his community, he stumbles across and finds refuge in the TARDIS, which has been drawn into E-Space via a wormhole-like phenomenon known as a Charged Vacuum Emboitment. He stows away when the Doctor, Romana and K9 Mark II leave Alzarius and becomes a companion in the following serial, State of Decay, accompanying them on the rest of their adventures in E-Space. He remains with the Doctor when Romana and K-9 leave and the TARDIS finds its way back into its own universe.

With a brilliant mathematical mind and wearing a star-shaped badge for mathematical excellence, Adric is well aware of his own intelligence. This, coupled with his relative immaturity, leads to a personality that is abrasive and occasionally crosses over into arrogance. As a result, Adric is one of the least popular, or even "most hated", of the Doctor's companions amongst some fans of the programme. However, Adric also seeks validation from the Doctor and those around him, and is often hurt and resentful if he feels he is being sidelined or unable to contribute. As an Alzarian, Adric is a member of a highly adaptable species, theoretically capable of genetically evolving to suit any environment, although it is unknown whether his particular substrain is capable of this. It is known that he possesses an inhumanly rapid rate of healing, though not to the extent he can regenerate amputated body parts.

Adric is present when, during the events of Logopolis, the Fourth Doctor falls from the Pharos Project radio telescope and regenerates into his fifth incarnation. He continues to travel in the TARDIS along with new companions Nyssa and Tegan, but his travels come to an end in Earthshock when he tries to stop a Cyberman-controlled freighter from crashing into Earth. The navigational controls are locked by logic codes, and Adric is entering the solution to the last code when the computer is destroyed by a dying Cyberman. He dies in the crash, while his crewmates watch in horror on the TARDIS viewscreen. His last words before the explosion kills him are "Now I'll never know if I was right." Adric dies not knowing that the freighter he was trying to stop would become the "meteor" that would wipe out the dinosaurs and lead to the rise of mammals and eventually humans (see Cretaceous–Paleogene extinction event and Alvarez hypothesis).

Adric's death affects his companions deeply. In Time-Flight, Tegan tries to persuade the Doctor to go back in time and save him, but the Doctor refuses to break the Laws of Time, even though it obviously pains him. In an effort to stop Nyssa and Tegan from travelling further, the Xeraphin try to use an illusion of Adric, pleading that if they travelled further they would kill him. They see through the deception when they realise Adric is still wearing his badge (which the Doctor had destroyed in order to kill the Cyber Leader) and travel forth, giving Adric another illusory death scene. Adric also appears as a hallucination at the end of The Caves of Androzani, and his name is the last word that the Fifth Doctor says before regenerating into the Sixth Doctor.

Decades later, in The Power of the Doctor, Tegan works to help UNIT fight back an invasion of Cybermen. An artificial intelligence projection of the Thirteenth Doctor appears before assuming the form of the Fifth Doctor. The two reconcile, with the Doctor assuring Tegan he has not forgotten about any of his companions. Tegan asks what the Doctor thinks is on her mind when surrounded by Cybermen. "Adric," the Doctor responds.

== Appearances in other media ==
Adric's sole appearance in the Virgin Missing Adventures range was in the Lance Parkin novel Cold Fusion, during which he meets the Seventh Doctor, who treats Adric warmly despite the future Doctor's distaste for his past self, with the Seventh's companion Roz comparing the Doctor's interaction with Adric to a grandfather complimenting a grandson. Adric also appears in the Past Doctor Adventures novel Divided Loyalties, which pits the Doctor against his old foe the Celestial Toymaker. Adric's image also appears as a manifestation of the Doctor's guilt in the Virgin New Adventures novel Timewyrm: Revelation by Paul Cornell, and a ghost of Adric features in the novel Empire of Death by David Bishop.

Adric appears in the Big Finish Productions audio drama The Boy That Time Forgot, portrayed by Andrew Sachs. In the story, he is unintentionally saved by Block Transfer Computations subconsciously sent to him by the Doctor during a 'seance'; this caused him to be sent into a pocket dimension, based on an Aztec jungle and populated primarily by giant scorpions and insects. Kept alive for centuries by the computations, Adric is eventually reunited with the Doctor and Nyssa when they seek the TARDIS after its theft by Thomas Brewster ("The Haunting of Thomas Brewster"). Driven insane by centuries of isolation and bitterness, Adric refuses to accept the Doctor's opinion that he is now essentially just an elderly teenager having tantrums when he doesn't get his way, and attempts to force Nyssa to become his bride. The Doctor admits that he permitted Adric to die, only for Adric to forgive him and use the last of his strength to send his friends home and recover the TARDIS, before dying himself.

In the IDW Publishing comic Doctor Who: The Forgotten by Tony Lee, a manifestation of Adric appears in the TARDIS Matrix, saving the Tenth Doctor's life and, in the process, dying a second time. This time, however, Adric is aware of his sacrifice, stating that "it's not a pointless death".

Adric appears in Magic: the Gathering's Universes Beyond: Doctor Who as "Adric, Mathematical Genius." He is identified as a human, and the card references his "ultimate sacrifice."

== Other mentions ==
A vision of Adric is seen, along with every other companion aside from Leela, on the scanner screen in Resurrection of the Daleks.

Adric's death is discussed between an older Tegan and a hologram projection of the Fifth Doctor in "The Power of the Doctor" after the former is reunited with the Cybermen.

Adric's death is mentioned by the Fifteenth Doctor in the 60th Anniversary Specials as he and the Fourteenth Doctor discuss Fourteen retiring.

== Concept and creation ==
During the production of Doctor Who's eighteenth season it became clear that Romana (Lalla Ward) and K9 would be leaving the series and that Tom Baker would depart his role as the Doctor at the conclusion of the season. To give viewers a sense of continuity it was decided that new companions should be introduced during the series, with the first, Adric being added as early as possible so he would be well established by the season's climax. He was described as a "cosmic Artful Dodger" by producer John Nathan-Turner who intended him to be "a roguish roughneck", whose charm would offset the criminal tendencies which emerged from his upbringing. However Waterhouse later noted that the Adric was written differently in each story and thus the character suffered from a lack of development.

Unimpressed by Waterhouse's acting ability, Tom Baker suggested that, "Because of his amazing appearance, Matthew should have played Adric like Sabu – a little wild boy who couldn't speak. I would talk to him rather like Basil Fawlty talks to Manuel, and he'd just nod or shake his head. But John [Nathan-Turner] didn't like that idea." Andrew Sachs, who played Manuel, would later portray Adric in a single story for Big Finish Productions.

== List of appearances ==
=== Television ===
Season 18

- Full Circle
- State of Decay
- Warriors' Gate
- The Keeper of Traken
- Logopolis

Season 19

- Castrovalva
- Four to Doomsday
- Kinda
- The Visitation
- Black Orchid
- Earthshock
- Time-Flight (illusion in episode 2)

Season 21

- The Caves of Androzani (illusion in episode 4)

=== Audio dramas ===
Doctor Who: The Monthly Adventures

- The Boy That Time Forgot (played by Andrew Sachs)
- The Star Men
- The Contingency Club
- Zaltys
- Kingdom of Lies
- Ghost Walk
- Serpent in the Silver Mask

Doctor Who: The Fourth Doctor Adventures

- Purgatory 12
- Chase the Night
- The Planet of Witches
- The Quest of the Engineer

Doctor Who: The Fifth Doctor Adventures

- The Fifth Doctor Box Set
  - Psychodrome
  - Iterations of I
- The Lost Resort and Other Stories
  - The Lost Resort
- Forty 1
  - God of War
- Forty 2
  - The Auton Infinity
- Dream Team
  - The Merfolk Murders
  - Dream Team

Doctor Who: Novel Adaptations

- Cold Fusion

Doctor Who: Special Releases

- Destiny of the Doctor: Smoke and Mirrors

Doctor Who: The Companion Chronicles

- The Darkening Eye (narrated by Nyssa)
- The Invasion of E-Space (narrated by Romana II)

Doctor Who: Short Trips

- The Toy
- A Full Life
- The Ingenious Adric of Alzarius
- Erasure
- Messages from the Dead

Doctor Who: The Audio Novels

- Watchers

=== Novels ===
Virgin Missing Adventures

- Cold Fusion by Lance Parkin

Past Doctor Adventures

- Divided Loyalties by Gary Russell

=== Short stories ===
- "A Boy's Tale" by Gary Russell (Short Trips: Companions)
- "Hearts of Stone" by Steve Lyons (Short Trips: Companions)
- "Ballon Debate" by Simon A Forward (Short Trips: Companions)
- "The Immortals" by Simon Guerrier (Short Trips: Past Tense)
- "Mauritz" by Jonathan Morris (Short Trips: A Universe of Terrors)
- "O, Darkness" by John Binns (Short Trips: Steel Skies)
- "In the TARDIS: Christmas Day" by Val Douglas (Short Trips: A Christmas Treasury)
- "First Born" by Lizzie Hopley (Short Trips: The Centenarian)
- "Planet of the Elves" by John Binns (Short Trips: Christmas Around the World)
- "Indigenous Species" by Steve Hatcher (Shelf Life)

=== Comics ===
- "Plague World" by Mel Powell (Doctor Who Annual 1982)
- "On The Planet Isopterus" by Glenn Rix (Doctor Who Annual 1983)
- "Planet of the Dead" by Lee Sullivan and John Freeman (Doctor Who Magazine 141-142) - although technically that is not Adric, but someone pretending to be him.
