= Matthew Waterhouse =

English actor and writer (born 1961)

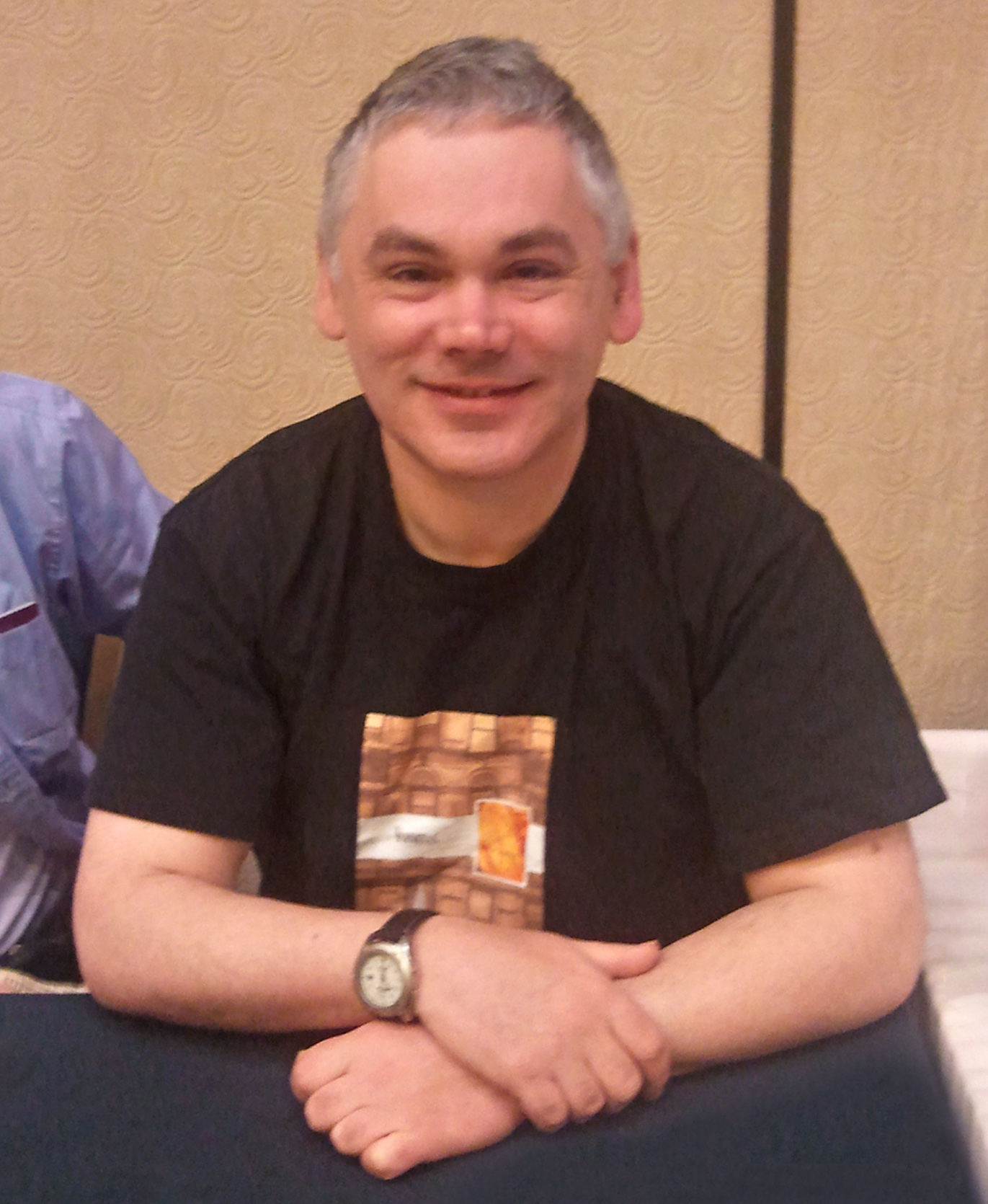
- Waterhouse at the 2011 Gallifrey One
- Born: 19 December 1961 (age 64); Hertford, Hertfordshire, England
- Education: Shoreham Grammar School
- Occupations: Actor, writer
- Years active: 1980–present
- Television: Adric in Doctor Who

Matthew Waterhouse (born 19 December 1961) is an English actor and writer, best known for his role as Adric in the BBC science fiction television series Doctor Who from 1980 to 1982.

== Early life ==
Waterhouse was born in Hertford, but brought up in Haywards Heath, Sussex. The son of a solicitor, he was educated at St. Wilfrid's Primary School, West Sussex and Shoreham Grammar School. Waterhouse was a great fan of Doctor Who in his younger days, claiming that he was "obsessed" with the show.

== Doctor Who ==
Adric was a companion of Tom Baker and Peter Davison's Doctors from 1980 to 1982. Waterhouse was the youngest actor to play a companion and Doctor Who was only his second professional acting role. He played the schoolboy Briarley in the BBC2 adaptation of To Serve Them All My Days with John Duttine, and it was only shortly before he filmed his appearance on the miniseries that he found out he had secured the role of Adric.

Waterhouse took part in audio commentaries for the DVD releases of Earthshock (2003), The Visitation (2004), The Keeper of Traken (2007), Four to Doomsday (2008), Black Orchid (2008), Full Circle (2009), State of Decay (2009) and Kinda (2011). Waterhouse talks about his complete tenure on the show in the featurette The Boy With the Golden Star dedicated to Adric on the Warriors' Gate DVD.

Waterhouse read the audiobook of the Target Books The Visitation for the BBC as well as Full Circle, Four to Doomsday and some Doctor Who Annual short stories. On 31 July 2013, Big Finish Productions announced that Waterhouse would be returning to play the role of Adric in a series of Fifth Doctor audio plays, beginning in 2014 with the Fifth Doctor Box Set followed by, so far, two trilogies of stories and the adaptation of Fifth Doctor and Seventh Doctor crossover novel Cold Fusion. He has also performed several Short Trips such as the award-winning A Full Life. As well as this he appeared in the ninth series of the Fourth Doctor Adventures, set during the E-Space trilogy, and performed his two Doctor Who' Audio Novels.

In November 2013 Waterhouse appeared in the one-off 50th anniversary comedy homage The Five(ish) Doctors Reboot.

In 2016 Waterhouse visited the locations for Black Orchid to record his Myth Makers interview DVD.

== Other acting work ==
Waterhouse guested on a number of shows after it was announced that he would be playing Adric. This included Saturday Night at the Mill (BBC Pebble Mill, 1980) and Top of the Pops (BBC, 1980). He also guested on Peter Davison's This Is Your Life (Thames TV, 1982) and Children in Need (BBC, 1985) with a range of Doctor Who actors. Waterhouse's only film appearance was in the 1986 sci-fi thriller The Killing Edge. Waterhouse, in a minor role, played a knife man.

In 1996 he made the science fiction pilot drama Ghostlands for MJTV Productions, and played the character Tom, alongside actors Jacqueline Pearce and Sylvester McCoy. Coincidentally, McCoy played the Seventh Doctor, although Waterhouse had left the show several years before.

Waterhouse has appeared in a wide range of theatre productions in the UK, and has appeared in the Shakespeare productions A Midsummer Night's Dream (as Puck), Twelfth Night (as Fabian), Macbeth (as Fleance) and Hamlet (as the title role). He also appeared in theatre productions of I Am David, The Lion, the Witch and the Wardrobe, Brighton Beach Memoirs (West Yorkshire Playhouse), Peter Pan (directed by actor Clive Swift) and Torch Song Trilogy.

Waterhouse also wrote and appeared in his own one-man show Adventures of Huckleberry Finn (Chipping Norton and UK Tour) which was directed by actor Murray Melvin (Bilis Manger in the Doctor Who spin-off drama Torchwood in 2007).

He also appeared as John Cunningham alongside David Selby (Quentin Collins) in the Dark Shadows audio story The Creeping Fog. In February 2011, it was announced that he would be starring in the Dark Shadows audio drama Bloodlust as Andrew Cunningham, husband of original regular TV show character Amy Jennings. Waterhouse has also appeared as Reverend Cunningham in the Scribe Award-winning Blood & Fire, the Dark Shadows 50th Anniversary story, and performed the short stories Last Orders at the Blue Whale and Tuesdays and Thursdays.

== Writings ==
In August 2006, Waterhouse's debut novel, Fates, Flowers: A Comedy of New York (ThisPress) was published. The book was republished in June 2010 by Hirst Books, along with two other books released later that year – Vanitas: A Comedy of New York and the best-selling memoir Blue Box Boy. A third, entitled Precious Liars, was released in 2013. Waterhouse has described the novels as "metaphysical camp". All four books were republished by What Noise Productions and a short story collection called Sugar was published by them in September 2016. Waterhouse has recorded audiobook versions of all his books.

Waterhouse wrote a Dark Shadows audio story Old Acquaintance which was performed by David Selby (Quentin). He has also written two Doctor Who Audio Novels, Watchers and Prisoners of London.

== Personal life ==
Waterhouse is gay. He lived in Greenwich, Connecticut in the United States from 1998 until 2016, although he regularly visited the UK. He has since returned to live full-time in the UK and resides in Haywards Heath, West Sussex with his American husband.
