= Eric Saward =

British radio scriptwriter (born 1944)

- Born: 9 December 1944 (age 81)
- Occupations: Scriptwriter, script editor
- Notable work: Doctor Who
- Partner: Jane Judge
- Children: 2

Eric Saward (/ˈseɪwʊd/; born 9 December 1944) is a British radio scriptwriter who worked as a screenwriter and script editor on the BBC's science fiction television series Doctor Who from 1982 to 1986. He wrote the stories The Visitation (1982), Earthshock (1982), Resurrection of the Daleks (1984) and Revelation of the Daleks (1985).

== Early life ==
Saward's father was an engineer at de Havilland in Hatfield, Hertfordshire. He was raised in Welwyn Garden City. He cited David Mercer, Brian Moore and Harold Pinter as early influences.

== Career ==
Saward's career as a scriptwriter began with drama for radio while he was working as a teacher. Later he was able to cross into full-time writing. He was approached by then Doctor Who script editor Christopher H. Bidmead to submit some ideas to the series on the strength of a recommendation from the senior drama script editor at BBC Radio. He received a commission to write the story The Visitation. This in turn led to his appointment as script editor on the recommendation of Antony Root, who had briefly replaced Bidmead. In addition to his role as script editor, Saward also wrote the television stories Earthshock, Resurrection of the Daleks and Revelation of the Daleks.

Saward also wrote the 1983 short story Birth of a Renegade in the special magazine published by Radio Times at the time of "The Five Doctors" (1983), the 20th Anniversary Special' (and Starlog Press in the United States) and the 1985 radio play Slipback which was broadcast on Radio 4. He wrote the novelisations of The Twin Dilemma and Attack of the Cybermen, as well as those of The Visitation and Slipback, for Target Books' Doctor Who range. Earthshock was novelised by Ian Marter. Saward eventually wrote novelisations of both of his Dalek stories, which were published in 2019.

Doctor Who producer John Nathan-Turner and Saward aroused controversy in 1985 because many of the stories of Colin Baker's first season as the Sixth Doctor contained numerous scenes of graphic violence and darker themes, which many commentators believed was inappropriate for a programme aimed at a family audience (the season featured acid baths, hangings, cell mutation experiments, executions by laser, cannibalism, poisonings, stabbings, suffocation by cyanide and a man having his hands crushed). Disapproval came from members of the general public, some Doctor Who fans, and BBC 1 controller Michael Grade publicly criticised the violence featured in the season and gave it as one of his reasons for putting the series on an 18-month hiatus from 1985 until 1986. Saward defended these scenes, saying they were intended to be dramatic and to warn audiences against real-world violence.

Saward had a sometimes strained relationship with Nathan-Turner, which gave rise to occasional tensions behind the scenes. When asked in July 1988, "If you could go back and start again, what would you change?" he replied, "the producer". Saward often objected to Nathan-Turner's insistence on hiring novice Doctor Who writers, which led to Saward having to work hard, not always successfully, on unsuitable scripts submitted by inexperienced contributors. Saward was eventually able to bring veteran writer Robert Holmes back to the series and they became friends before the latter's death. Saward's working relationship with Nathan-Turner deteriorated further. He had disagreed with Nathan-Turner's casting of Baker as the Sixth Doctor and, following the 1985 hiatus, problems peaked during the production of The Trial of a Time Lord in 1986 when he resigned as script editor before completing the season's scripts. He subsequently denounced Nathan-Turner in an issue of Starburst.

After resigning from Doctor Who, Saward's continued an association with the series. In the 1990s, he wrote linking narration for Doctor Who audio releases of missing episodes and later appeared in interviews on DVDs of his serials. He also contributed a short story to the Big Finish Short Trips collection. Saward has not worked in British television since leaving Doctor Who. In 2020, Saward made his first foray into the comic book medium with the eponymous limited series Lytton, centred on the character he created for the Doctor Who serials Resurrection of the Daleks and Attack of the Cybermen.

== Personal life ==
Saward lived in the Netherlands for three years, where he was briefly married. Saward's long-term partner is Jane Judge, who was the BBC production secretary for the Doctor Who office when he became script editor on the series. They have been in a relationship since then. He had previously been in a relationship with fellow writer Paula Woolsey, who was credited (as Paula Moore) with writing the Doctor Who serial Attack of the Cybermen (1985).

== Notes ==
Preceded by Antony Root	Doctor Who Script Editor; 1982–86	Succeeded by Andrew Cartmel
