= Sarah Sutton =

British actress (born 1961)

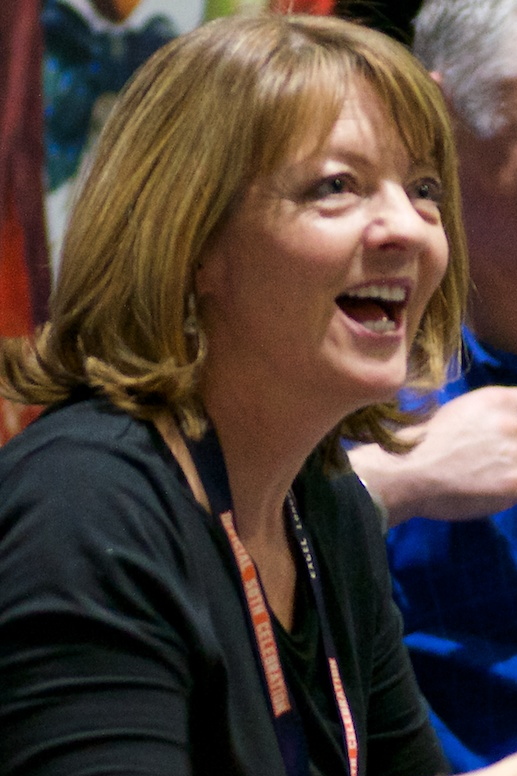
- Sutton at the Doctor Who 50th Anniversary Celebration Weekend in 2013
- Born: 12 December 1961 (age 64); Basingstoke, Hampshire, England
- Education: Guildhall School of Music and Drama
- Occupation: Actress
- Years active: 1973–present
- Known for: Nyssa in Doctor Who
- Spouse: Michael Bundy (m. 1985)
- Children: 1

Sarah Sutton (born 12 December 1961) is a British actress. She played the role of Nyssa in the BBC science fiction television series Doctor Who.

== Early life ==
Sutton was born in Basingstoke, Hampshire, England. Sutton studied ballet as a child and was only 11 when she became the youngest British actress to have played Alice on screen, in a 1973 television film of Alice Through the Looking Glass.

She began acting at the age of nine in A. A. Milne's Winnie-the-Pooh. She made her first appearance as Baby Roo just five days after her ninth birthday at the Phoenix Theatre in the West End of London, 1970–1972.

Besides her performance as Alice, Sutton appeared in a number of television programmes before Doctor Who, including The Moon Stallion (1978) as Diana Purwell and The Crucible (1980) as Susannah Walcott.

== Career ==
Sutton portrayed the character of Nyssa, a Trakenite aristocrat, in Doctor Who. She is exactly one week older than her co–star, fellow companion Matthew Waterhouse. Her first appearance in the role was in the 1981 serial The Keeper of Traken. Initially, Nyssa was intended to appear only in one story, the production team later deciding to keep her as a continuing character. After joining the Fourth Doctor in the subsequent story Logopolis, her final full Doctor Who serial was with the Fifth Doctor, in 1983's Terminus.

Sutton took a break from acting after Doctor Who, focusing for a number of years on raising her daughter. She made a brief appearance in Peter Davison's final Doctor Who serial, The Caves of Androzani (1984), played Sarah Dryden in a 1989 episode of the BBC medical drama series Casualty and Wendy in a 1992 episode of Unnatural Pursuits.

Sutton reprised the role of Nyssa in the 1993 Doctor Who Children in Need special Dimensions in Time, and since 1999 has appeared in multiple spin-off Doctor Who audio plays produced by Big Finish Productions. In November 2013 she appeared in the one-off 50th anniversary comedy homage The Five(ish) Doctors Reboot. In 1997 she starred in a special episode of the BBC's dramatic reconstruction series 999 marking 10 years since the great storm of 1987.

Sutton also appeared in several episodes of MJTV's original audio sci-fi CD series Soldiers of Love as Colonel Franklyn. She also played Sharon in the Take 1 Productions educational video drama TravelWise (2000).

In 2001 Sutton starred as Sarah in Wirrn: Race Memory, a BBV audio reusing concepts from Doctor Who.

In 2006 Sutton played Asaria, a role written specifically for her in the original science fiction audio monologue The Jarillion Mercy.

== Personal life ==
In 1985, Sutton married Michael Bundy, a general practitioner. They have a daughter, Hannah (born 1991).

== Filmography ==
=== Television ===
Year	Title	Role	Notes
1973	Menace	Belinda	Episode: "Boys and Girls Come Out to Play"
1973	Play for Today	Little Lavina	Episode: "Baby Blues"
1973	Alice Through the Looking Glass	Alice	TV film
1975	Late Call	Myra Longmore	3 episodes
1975	Ten from the Twenties	Ina	Episode: "Aunt Tatty"
1975	Oil Strike North	Amanda Fraser	Episode: "Time of Hazard"
1976	Westway	Sue Harvey	5 episodes
1978	The Moon Stallion	Diana Purwell	All 6 episodes
1981	The Crucible	Susannah Walcott	TV film
1981	Byron: A Personal Tour	Mary Chaworth	TV film
1981–1984	Doctor Who	Nyssa	48 episodes
1982	Doctor Who	Ann Talbot	Serial: "Black Orchid" - 2 episodes
1989	Casualty	Sarah Dryden	Episode: "Charity"
1992	Unnatural Pursits	Wendy	Episode: "I'm the Author"
1993	Doctor Who	Nyssa	Episode: "Dimensions in Time" (two charity special mini-episodes)

=== Radio and CD audio drama ===
Year	Title	Role	Notes
1999–2002	Soldiers of Love	Colonel Franklyn	MJTV; 7 episodes
2000–2021	Doctor Who: The Monthly Range	Nyssa	Big Finish Productions; 64 releases
2001	Race Memory	Sarah	BBV Productions
2006	The Jarillion Mercy	Asaria	The Jarillion Productions
2008	Doctor Who: The Companion Chronicles	Nyssa	Story: "The Darkening Eye"
2011	Doctor Who: The Lost Stories	Nyssa	3 releases
2011	The Five Companions	Nyssa	Special release
2013	The Light at the End	Nyssa	Special release
2014	Dark Shadows: The Devil Cat	Emma Simon	Big Finish Productions
2014–present	Doctor Who: The Fifth Doctor Adventures	Nyssa	8 releases
2015–present	Big Finish Short Trips	Nyssa	6 releases
2016	Cold Fusion	Nyssa	Novel Adaptation
2018	Star Cops: Mother Earth 2	Mary Ward	Big Finish Productions
2020	Timeslip: The Age of the Death Lottery	Charlotte Trent	Big Finish Productions
2020	Timeslip: The War That Never Was	Charlotte Trent	Big Finish Productions
2023	Timeslip: A Life Never Lived	Charlotte Trent	Big Finish Productions
2023	Timeslip: The Time Of The Tipping Point	Charlotte Trent	Big Finish Productions
2021	The War Master	Nyssa	Story: "The Orphan"
2022	Tenth Doctor Classic Companions	Nyssa	Story: "The Stuntman"
