= Target Books =

British publishing imprint

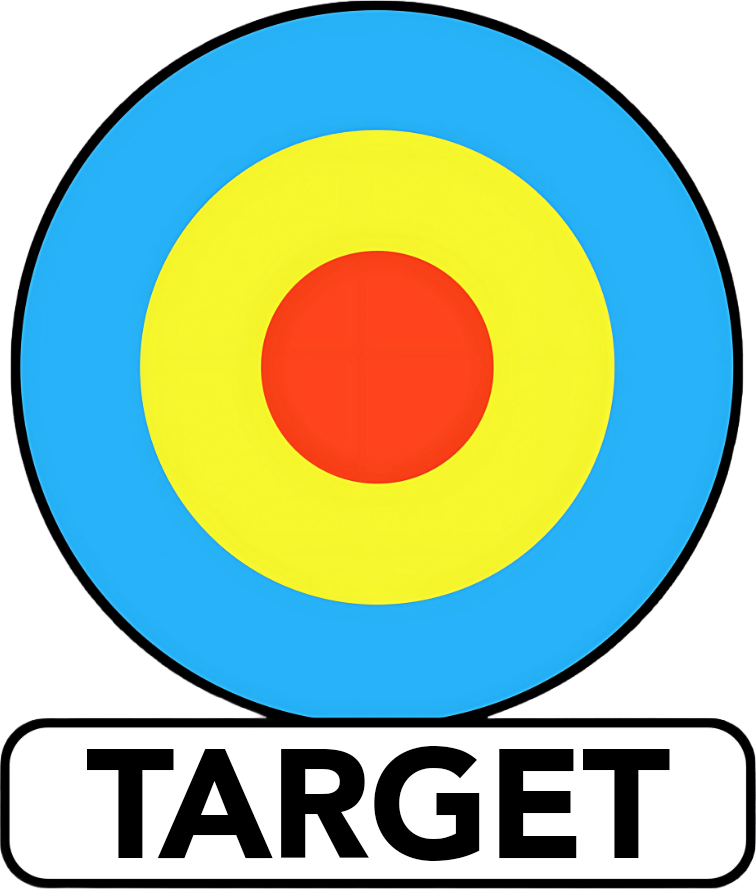
- Parent company: Universal-Tandem Publishing Co Ltd (1973–1975); W. H. Allen Ltd (1975–1987); Virgin Books (1987–1994); Ebury Publishing (2018–present)
- Founded: 1973
- Country of origin: United Kingdom

Target Books is a British publishing imprint, established in 1973 by Universal-Tandem Publishing Co Ltd, a paperback publishing company. The imprint was established as a children's imprint to complement the adult Tandem imprint, and became well known for their highly successful range of novelisations and other assorted books based on the popular science fiction television series Doctor Who. Their first publications based on the serial were reprints in paperback of three novels which had been previously published as hardbacks by Frederick Muller Ltd: Doctor Who and the Daleks and Doctor Who and the Crusaders by David Whitaker, and Doctor Who and the Zarbi by Bill Strutton. As these sold well further novelisations of the show were commissioned. In 1975 Universal-Tandem was sold by its American owners, the Universal-Award group, to the British conglomerate Howard and Wyndham. The company was renamed Tandem Publishing Ltd before being merged with the paperback imprints of Howard and Wyndham's general publishing house W. H. Allen Ltd to become Wyndham Publications Ltd in 1976. However, during 1977 and 1978, the Wyndham identity was phased out and, until 1990, Target books were published by 'the paperback division of WH Allen & Co'.

The most prolific writer in the Doctor Who range was Terrance Dicks, while actor turned writer Ian Marter, Malcolm Hulke, Philip Hinchcliffe and Nigel Robinson (who was for a time the editor of the range) were also contributors.

The company also produced novelisations of various other films and television series, again aimed mostly at the child and teenage markets. They also published a number of original children's and teenage novels. In 1973, the company produced a successful paperback edition of Tim Dinsdale's book, The Story of the Loch Ness Monster. In 1977, Target published the novelisation of the Ray Harryhausen film, Sinbad and the Eye of the Tiger.

W. H. Allen was acquired by Virgin Books in a process that spanned late 1986 to late 1987. In 1994, the Target imprint was closed down and the last three novelisation published by Virgin were under the Doctor Who Books imprint. They did, however, feature the Target logo inside and were numbered in Target's "Doctor Who Library" on inside pages.

Random House, through its United Kingdom division, acquired a 90% stake in Virgin Books (including Target) in March 2007. In November 2009, Virgin became an independent imprint within Ebury Publishing, a division of the Random House Group.

Ebury Publishing having acquired a majority shareholding of BBC Books in 2006, BBC Books published reprints of several of the Target Doctor Who novelisations starting in 2011 .

In 2018, BBC Books started publishing novelisations of select post-2005 Doctor Who stories and a new abridged version of City of Death using the Target branding in a range of books called the Target Collection. This range also included novelisations of stories not published by the original Target Books, as they were unable to secure rights as well as print versions of audiobook exclusive novelisations previously released by BBC Audio.

== See also ==
- List of Doctor Who novelisations
