= List of books based on Doctor Who =

Lists of books based on Doctor Who cover different types of book in the Doctor Who media franchise. These include novels, audiobooks, and short story anthologies. The lists are organized by publisher and imprint.

== Doctor Who novelisations ==
The novelisations of TV episodes were published from 1964 onwards by various publishers, including:

- Between 1964 and 1966, three books based on First Doctor serials were published in hardcover by Frederick Muller Ltd.
- Between 1973 and 1991, Target Books published 156 books, covering almost every Doctor Who television story that was originally broadcast from 1963 to 1989. The Target Books imprint was also used for five books in 2018 and seven books published in 2021.
- In 1996, BBC Books published a novelization of the 1996 TV movie. From 2012 to 2019, BBC Books published novelisations of the 1970s and 1980s serials Target was unable to publish. Most of these books were republished starting in 2018 as part of The Target Collection, which also included adaptations of select episodes of the revived series.
- One range of novelisations, the companion range, focused on telling new stories centred around the companions. 2 novels were published in this series.
- In 1989, a series of novelisations of unproduced TV stories began. There are 7 books in this series.

== Virgin Books novel series ==
Novel series published by Virgin Books:

=== Virgin New Adventures ===
Published from 1991 to 1999, these continued the story of the Doctor from the point at which the television programme went into hiatus from television in 1989. They featured the Seventh Doctor from 1991 to 1997, plus one book with the Eighth Doctor. From 1997 to 1999, they focused on Bernice Summerfield and the Doctor did not appear. 84 books were published in this series.

=== Virgin Missing Adventures ===
Published from 1994 to 1997, these featured the First through Sixth Doctors with stories set between televised episodes of the programme, with these stories primarily being used to plug gaps present within the television series' events. It features many sequels to on-screen stories, and many novels paid homage to the style of particular eras of the show. Virgin had purchased the successful children's imprint Target Books in 1989, with Virgin's new fiction editor Peter Darvill-Evans taking over the range. Target's major output was novelisations of televised Doctor Who stories, and Darvill-Evans realised that there were few stories left to be novelised. He approached the BBC for permission to commission original stories written directly for print, but such a licence was initially refused. However, after the television series was cancelled at the end of 1989, Virgin were granted the licence to produce full-length original novels continuing the story from the point at which the series had concluded.

==== List of Virgin Missing Adventures ====
#	Title	Author	Doctor	Featuring	Published
1	Goth Opera	Paul Cornell	Fifth	Tegan, Nyssa, Romana	July 1994
2	Evolution	John Peel	Fourth	Sarah Jane	September 1994
3	Venusian Lullaby	Paul Leonard	First	Ian, Barbara	October 1994
4	The Crystal Bucephalus	Craig Hinton	Fifth	Tegan, Turlough, Kamelion, Dorothy	November 1994
5	State of Change	Christopher Bulis	Sixth	Peri	December 1994
6	The Romance of Crime	Gareth Roberts	Fourth	Romana II, K-9	January 1995
7	The Ghosts of N-Space	Barry Letts	Third	Sarah Jane, the Brigadier	February 1995
8	Time of Your Life	Steve Lyons	Sixth	Grant Markham	March 1995
9	Dancing the Code	Paul Leonard	Third	Jo, UNIT	April 1995
10	The Menagerie	Martin Day	Second	Jamie, Zoe	May 1995
11	System Shock	Justin Richards	Fourth	Sarah, Harry	June 1995
12	The Sorcerer's Apprentice	Christopher Bulis	First	Ian, Barbara, Susan	July 1995
13	Invasion of the Cat-People	Gary Russell	Second	Ben, Polly	August 1995
14	Managra	Stephen Marley	Fourth	Sarah Jane	September 1995
15	Millennial Rites	Craig Hinton	Sixth	Mel	October 1995
16	The Empire of Glass	Andy Lane	First	Steven, Vicki; plus Irving Braxiatel	November 1995
17	Lords of the Storm	David A. McIntee	Fifth	Turlough	December 1995
18	Downtime	Marc Platt	none	The Brigadier, Sarah Jane, Victoria	January 1996
19	The Man in the Velvet Mask	Daniel O'Mahony	First	Dodo	February 1996
20	The English Way of Death	Gareth Roberts	Fourth	Romana II, K-9	March 1996
21	The Eye of the Giant	Christopher Bulis	Third	Liz Shaw, UNIT	April 1996
22	The Sands of Time	Justin Richards	Fifth	Tegan, Nyssa	May 1996
23	Killing Ground	Steve Lyons	Sixth	Grant Markham	June 1996
24	The Scales of Injustice	Gary Russell	Third	Liz Shaw, UNIT	July 1996
25	The Shadow of Weng-Chiang	David A. McIntee	Fourth	Romana I, K-9	August 1996
26	Twilight of the Gods	Christopher Bulis	Second	Jamie, Victoria	September 1996
27	Speed of Flight	Paul Leonard	Third	Jo, Mike Yates	October 1996
28	The Plotters	Gareth Roberts	First	Ian, Barbara, Vicki	November 1996
29	Cold Fusion	Lance Parkin	Fifth and Seventh	Adric, Nyssa, Tegan; Roz, Chris	December 1996
30	Burning Heart	Dave Stone	Sixth	Peri	January 1997
31	A Device of Death	Christopher Bulis	Fourth	Sarah Jane, Harry	February 1997
32	The Dark Path	David A. McIntee	Second	Jamie, Victoria	March 1997
33	The Well-Mannered War	Gareth Roberts	Fourth	Romana II, K-9	April 1997

=== Virgin Decalog ===
Published from 1994 to 1997, these contained multiple short stories published in one book.

=== Who Killed Kennedy ===
In 1996, Virgin Books published Who Killed Kennedy, a Doctor Who novel by David Bishop. Although set during the time of the Third Doctor, Virgin published this book as a standalone work and not as part of the Missing Adventures series.

== BBC Books novel series ==
Novel series published by BBC Books:

- Eighth Doctor Adventures: Published from 1997 to 2005, these featured the Eighth Doctor (who had appeared in one TV episode only). 73 books were published in this series.
- Past Doctor Adventures: Published from 1997 to 2005, these featured First through Seventh Doctors, following the lead set by Virgin Missing Adventures series. 76 books were published in this series.
- BBC Short Trips: Published from 1998 to 2000, these were short story anthologies. Three volumes were published in this series. More Short Trips would be published by Big Finish Productions following the end of the book series.
- New Series Adventures: Published from 2005 (and still active), these feature the Ninth Doctor onwards. The featured Doctor aligns with the active TV series. As of February 2025, 78 standard-length novels, 8+ larger "supersize" novels, 38 original audiobooks and various other books have been published.

=== Monsters books ===
The Doctor Who Monsters Books are a series of guide books related to Doctor Who. The first three books, released from 2005 to 2007, dealt with the monstrous foes faced by the Doctor in the television series. The fourth book, released in 2008, focused on spaceships rather than monsters, similar to the fifth book, Companions and Allies by Steve Tribe, which dealt with The Doctor's companions. The Ultimate Monster Guide is the sixth, and contains completely revised and updated entries from the first three books.

No	Title	Cover Stars	Writer	Released
1	Monsters and Villains	Christopher Eccleston; Billie Piper; A Dalek	Justin Richards	19 May 2005
2	Aliens and Enemies	David Tennant; Billie Piper; The Cyber Controller	Justin Richards	25 May 2006
3	Creatures and Demons	David Tennant; Freema Agyeman; Dalek Sec	Justin Richards	10 May 2007
4	Starships and Spacestations	David Tennant; Catherine Tate; Army of Daleks and Ships	Justin Richards	1 May 2008
5	Companions and Allies	David Tennant; Catherine Tate; Billie Piper; John Barrowman; Freema Agyeman; Elisabeth Sladen; The TARDIS and K9	Steve Tribe	28 May 2009
6	The Ultimate Monster Guide	David Tennant; A Dalek; The Cyber Controller; Army of Dalek Ships	Justin Richards	24 September 2009

== Big Finish Books Series ==
Shortly after they acquired the license to produce Doctor Who audios they also started to produce Doctor Who Books.

- Big Finish Short Trips: Published from 2001 to 2009 by Big Finish Productions, these are short story anthologies. The name was inherited the BBC Short Trips series, which was discontinued by BBC Books for cost reasons. Big Finish Productions negotiated a licence to continue producing these collections, publishing them in hardback to allow for a higher cover price. 28 volumes were published in this series.
- Bernice Summerfield: a series of 31 books starring Virgin New Adventures character: Bernice Summerfield.
- Iris Wildthyme: a series of 23 books starring Eighth Doctor Adventures character: Iris Wildthyme.
- New Worlds: a series of 2 unrelated books which were released under this imprint and don't fit into another category.

== Candy Jar Books ==
Independent publishing company Candy Jar Books has published five series based on Doctor Who since 2015:

- Lethbridge-Stewart: A series of 56 books starring Brigadier Alistair-Gordon Lethbridge-Stewart.
- Lucy Wilson Mysteries: A series about the granddaughter of Brigadier Lethbridge-Stewart. There are 26 books in this series.
- Professor Howe: A parody series about a rather rubbish time traveller
- Travers and Wells: A spin-off of the Lethbridge-Stewart books. There are 4 books in this series.
- Counter Measures: A series of books about the Counter Measures team. There are two books in this series.

== Arcbeatle Press ==
- Cwej: The Series: Featuring the character of Chris Cwej from the Virgin New Adventures
- SIGNET: A spin-off series featuring characters and monsters licensed from individual creators.

== Telos Publishing ==
Since being formed, Telos Publishing Ltd. has published a wide variety of works, from original novellas based on Doctor Who to original horror and fantasy novels. They also produce a variety of unofficial guide books to popular television and film series, as well as the Time Hunter series of novellas. Starburst magazine called them "perhaps the UK's best-known independent publishers of Doctor Who books".

Title	Author	Foreword	Artist	Doctor	Companion(s)	Published
Time and Relative	Kim Newman	Justin Richards	Bryan Talbot	First	Susan Foreman	November 2001
Citadel of Dreams	Dave Stone	Andrew Cartmel	Lee Sullivan	Seventh	Ace	March 2002
Nightdreamers	Tom Arden	Katy Manning	Martin McKenna	Third	Jo Grant	May 2002
Ghost Ship	Keith Topping	Hugh Lamb	Dariusz Jasiczak	Fourth	None	August 2002
Foreign Devils	Andrew Cartmel	Mike Ashley	Mike Collins	Second	Jamie McCrimmon and Zoe Heriot	November 2002
Rip Tide	Louise Cooper	Stephen Gallagher	Fred Gambino	Eighth	None	January 2003
Wonderland	Mark Chadbourn	Graham Joyce	Dominic Harman	Second	Ben Jackson and Polly	April 2003
Shell Shock	Simon A Forward	Guy N. Smith	Bob Covington	Sixth	Peri Brown	June 2003
The Cabinet of Light	Daniel O'Mahony	Chaz Brenchley	John Higgins	Unspecified Doctor	None	July 2003
Fallen Gods	Jon Blum and Kate Orman	Storm Constantine	Darryl Joyce	Eighth	None	August 2003
Frayed	Tara Samms (pseudonym for Stephen Cole)	Stephen Laws	Chris Moore	First	Susan	October 2003
The Eye of the Tyger	Paul J. McAuley	Neil Gaiman	Jim Burns	Eighth	None	November 2003
Companion Piece	Robert Perry and Mike Tucker	Rev Colin Midlane	Allan Bednar	Seventh	Catherine Broome	December 2003
Blood and Hope	Iain McLaughlin	John Ostrander	Walter Howarth	Fifth	Peri Brown and Erimem	January 2004
The Dalek Factor	Simon Clark	Christopher Fowler	Graham Humphreys	Unspecified Doctor	None	February 2004

=== Time Hunter ===
A series focused on "time sensitive" Honoré Lechasseur and "time channeler" Emily Blandish, characters first introduced in Telos' Doctor Who novella The Cabinet of Light.

- The Winning Side by Lance Parkin (November 2003)
- The Tunnel at the End of the Light by Stefan Petrucha| (March 2004)
- The Clockwork Woman by Claire Bott (June 2004)
- Kitsune by John Paul Catton (October 2004)
- The Severed Man by George Mann (December 2004)
- Echoes by Iain McLaughlin and Claire Bartlett (April 2005)
- Peculiar Lives by Philip Purser-Hallard (July 2005)
- Deus Le Volt by Jon de Burgh Miller (January 2006)
- The Albino's Dancer by Dale Smith (June 2006)
- The Sideways Door by R.J. Carter and Troy Riser (August 2006)
- Child of Time by George Mann and David J Howe (August 2007)

== Other series ==
- Doctor Who and the Invasion From Space: A single 45 page novel published by World Distributors (Manchester) LTD in 1966
- Plot-your-own Doctor Who adventure: A series of 2 books published by FASA later in 1986.
- Make Your Own Adventure/Find Your Fate: In 1986, a series of six multiple-plot concept books by several authors was published in parallel by Severn House as Make Your Own Adventure With Dr Who and Ballantine Books as Find Your Fate: Dr Who. Each volume allows for different progressions based on the readers decisions and dice rolls: Search for the Doctor, Crisis in Space, Garden of Evil, Mission to Venus, Invasion of the Ormazoids and Race Against Time.
- Faction Paradox: A series of books about the story of faction paradox and the associated "War in Heaven" released by various publishers. 31 books were published in this series.
- Over the years two now rather rare charity books have been published: Time's Champion and Seasons of War: Gallifrey
- Erimem: a series of books about fifth doctor companion Ermimem by Thebes publishing. There are 16 books in this series.
- Doctor Who Files, a series of books for young readers.
- Two spin-off shows also have their own books series: List of Torchwood novels and audio books and Class.
- List of Doctor Who audiobooks (various publishers)
