= The Book of the War =

2002 novel by Lawrence Miles

- Author: Lawrence Miles et al.
- Cover artist: Steve Johnson
- Language: English
- Series: Faction Paradox
- Genre: Science fiction
- Publisher: Mad Norwegian Press
- Publication date: 2002
- Publication place: United States
- Media type: Print (Trade Paperback and Hardback editions)
- Pages: 272
- ISBN: 1-57032-905-2 (pb); 1-57032-907-9 (hb)
- OCLC: 67992508
- Followed by: This Town Will Never Let Us Go

The Book of the War is a hypertext, multi-author novel presented in the form of an encyclopedia of the first fifty years of the War in Heaven in the Faction Paradox universe, which is based on Doctor Who lore and canon. The book was edited and written by Lawrence Miles, and co-authors include Simon Bucher-Jones, Daniel O'Mahony, Ian McIntire, Mags L. Halliday, Helen Fayle, Philip Purser-Hallard, Kelly Hale, Jonathan Dennis, and Mark Clapham.

== Content ==
Despite there being various plots and subplots within the book, it is primarily a guide to the many important factions involved with the War in Heaven. These include Faction Paradox itself, the Great Houses, the Celestis, the Remote, and Posthumanity. A number of hints about the mysterious Enemy against whom the Great Houses are fighting are scattered throughout the text, but nothing conclusive is ever stated. The book details many individuals, events, technologies, and concepts related to the War.

The book makes references to the Doctor Who novels Alien Bodies, Interference, The Taking of Planet 5, and The Shadows of Avalon, and it features the characters Compassion and Chris Cwej, who first appeared in Interference and Original Sin. A number of other parallels with Doctor Who characters and concepts can be found, but these links are not explicit. No familiarity with Doctor Who is required to appreciate The Book of the War.

Characters and settings from The Book of the War appear in later Faction Paradox novels including Of the City of the Saved..., Warring States and Newtons Sleep, and the short story anthology A Romance in Twelve Parts.

== See also ==
The otherwise unrelated novel Dictionary of the Khazars is a rare example of similar use of a non-linear encyclopedic structure for a work of fiction.
