= The Black Archive =

Series of critical monographs about Doctor Who stories

- Editor: Philip Purser-Hallard, Stuart Douglas, Paul Driscoll, Kara Dennison
- Categories: Media studies
- Frequency: Bi-Monthly
- First issue: 1 March 2016; 10 years ago
- Company: Obverse Books
- Country: United Kingdom
- Based in: Edinburgh, Scotland
- Language: English
- Website: www.blackarchive.co.uk

The Black Archive is a series of critical monographs about selected individual Doctor Who stories, from the series' earliest history to the present day. Rather than focusing on behind-the-scenes production history as much Doctor Who fan scholarship has done, the series aims to analyse and explore the stories as broadcast. It has been described by Sci-Fi Bulletin as "a fascinating series of short books", and by Doctor Who Magazine as "a grandly ambitious thing to attempt with something as exhaustively detailed as Doctor Who. But they actually manage it."

The series is edited by Stuart Douglas, Paul Driscoll, Kara Dennison and Philip Purser-Hallard, and is published by Obverse Books. Previous editors have included James Cooray Smith and Paul Simpson. The series showcases the criticism of prominent Doctor Who critics and authors such as Simon Bucher-Jones, James Cooray Smith, Simon Guerrier, Una McCormack, James F. McGrath, Fiona Moore, Jonathan Morris, Kate Orman, Ian Potter and Dale Smith, as well as of less established and new writers. It is named after the museum of alien artifacts seen in the Doctor Who stories "The Day of the Doctor" and "The Zygon Inversion".

== History ==
The series was launched in March 2016 with the release of the first four books: "Rose" (2005), The Massacre (1966), The Ambassadors of Death (1970), and "Dark Water" / "Death in Heaven" (2014). James Cooray Smith's book on The Massacre was singled out for particular praise for its placing the serial in its historical context, both that of its 1570s setting and that of its writing and production in the 1960s.

Subsequent titles were published every two months and continued to gain consistently positive reviews. In 2018, the series moved to a monthly publication schedule: the books for that year were announced early in 2017. The tenth volume, on the 2003 Doctor Who webcast Scream of the Shalka, reprinted the detailed episode breakdown treatment for "Blood of the Robots", the commissioned but unmade sequel story by Simon Clark. The 25th book, on the 1996 Doctor Who TV movie, included a foreword by, and a new interview with, scriptwriter Matthew Jacobs, and others include new interviews with scriptwriter Chris Boucher and director Farren Blackburn.

John Toon won the Sir Julius Vogel Award for Best Professional Production/Publication for his monographs on Full Circle in 2019 and Paradise Towers in 2023. Jacob Edwards's monograph on The Romans was submitted for the Convenors' Award for Excellence at the Aurealis Awards in 2019, but lost to Jason Nahrung's Watermarks.

== Published titles ==
- The Black Archive #1: Rose by Jon Arnold (March 2016)
- The Black Archive #2: The Massacre by James Cooray Smith (March 2016)
- The Black Archive #3: The Ambassadors of Death by L M Myles (March 2016)
- The Black Archive #4: Dark Water / Death in Heaven by Philip Purser-Hallard (March 2016)
- The Black Archive #5: Image of the Fendahl by Simon Bucher-Jones (May 2016)
- The Black Archive #6: Ghost Light by Jonathan Dennis (July 2016)
- The Black Archive #7: The Mind Robber by Andrew Hickey (September 2016)
- The Black Archive #8: Black Orchid by Ian Millsted (November 2016)
- The Black Archive #9: The God Complex by Paul Driscoll (January 2017)
- The Black Archive #10: Scream of the Shalka by Jon Arnold (March 2017)
- The Black Archive #11: The Evil of the Daleks by Simon Guerrier (May 2017)
- The Black Archive #12: Pyramids of Mars by Kate Orman (July 2017)
- The Black Archive #13: Human Nature / The Family of Blood by Naomi Jacobs and Philip Purser-Hallard (September 2017)
- The Black Archive #14: The Ultimate Foe by James Cooray Smith (November 2017)
- The Black Archive #15: Full Circle by John Toon (January 2018)
- The Black Archive #16: Carnival of Monsters by Ian Potter (February 2018)
- The Black Archive #17: The Impossible Planet / The Satan Pit by Simon Bucher-Jones (March 2018)
- The Black Archive #18: Marco Polo by Dene October (April 2018)
- The Black Archive #19: The Eleventh Hour by Jon Arnold (May 2018)
- The Black Archive #20: Face the Raven by Sarah Groenewegen (June 2018)
- The Black Archive #21: Heaven Sent by Kara Dennison (July 2018)
- The Black Archive #22: Hell Bent by Alyssa Franke (August 2018)
- The Black Archive #23: The Curse of Fenric by Una McCormack (September 2018)
- The Black Archive #24: The Time Warrior by Matthew Kilburn (October 2018)
- The Black Archive #25: Doctor Who (1996) by Paul Driscoll (November 2018)
- The Black Archive #26: The Dæmons by Matt Barber (December 2018)
- The Black Archive #27: The Face of Evil by Thomas L Rodebaugh (January 2019)
- The Black Archive #28: Love & Monsters by Niki Haringsma (February 2019)
- The Black Archive #29: The Impossible Astronaut / Day of the Moon by John Toon (March 2019)
- The Black Archive #30: The Dalek Invasion of Earth by Jonathan Morris (April 2019)
- The Black Archive #31: Warriors' Gate by Frank Collins (May 2019)
- The Black Archive #32: The Romans by Jacob Edwards (June 2019)
- The Black Archive #33: Horror of Fang Rock by Matthew Guerrieri (July 2019)
- The Black Archive #34: Battlefield by Philip Purser-Hallard (August 2019)
- The Black Archive #35: Timelash by Phil Pascoe (September 2019)
- The Black Archive #36: Listen by Dewi Small (October 2019)
- The Black Archive #37: Kerblam! by Naomi Jacobs and Thomas L Rodebaugh (November 2019)
- The Black Archive #38: The Sound of Drums / Last of the Time Lords by James Mortimer (December 2019)
- The Black Archive #39: The Silurians by Robert Smith? (January 2020)
- The Black Archive #40: The Underwater Menace by James Cooray Smith (April 2020)
- The Black Archive #41: Vengeance on Varos by Jonathan Dennis (April 2020)
- The Black Archive #42: The Rings of Akhaten by William Shaw (April 2020)
- The Black Archive #43: The Robots of Death by Fiona Moore (May 2020)
- The Black Archive #44: The Pandorica Opens / The Big Bang by Philip Bates (June 2020)
- The Black Archive #45: The Deadly Assassin by Andrew Orton (July 2020)
- The Black Archive #46: The Awakening by David Evans-Powell (August 2020)
- The Black Archive #47: The Stones of Blood by Katrin Thier (September 2020)
- The Black Archive #48: Arachnids in the UK by Sam Maleski (October 2020)
- The Black Archive #49: The Night of the Doctor by James Cooray Smith (November 2020)
- The Black Archive #50: The Day of the Doctor by Alasdair Stuart (December 2020)
- The Black Archive #51: Earthshock by Brian J Robb (February 2021)
- The Black Archive #52: The Battle of Ranskoor Av Kolos by James F McGrath (April 2021)
- The Black Archive #53: The Hand of Fear by Simon Bucher-Jones (June 2021)
- The Black Archive #54: Dalek by Billy Seguire (August 2021)
- The Black Archive #55: Invasion of the Dinosaurs by Jon Arnold (October 2021)
- The Black Archive #56: The Haunting of Villa Diodati by Philip Purser-Hallard (December 2021)
- The Black Archive #57: Vincent and the Doctor by Paul Driscoll (February 2022)
- The Black Archive #58: The Talons of Weng-Chiang by Dale Smith (April 2022)
- The Black Archive #59: Kill the Moon by Darren Mooney (June 2022)
- The Black Archive #60: The Sun Makers by Lewis Baston (August 2022)
- The Black Archive #61: Paradise Towers by John Toon (October 2022)
- The Black Archive #62: Kinda by Frank Collins (December 2022)
- The Black Archive #63: Flux edited by Paul Driscoll (essays by seven authors) (February 2023)
- The Black Archive #64: The Girl Who Died by Tom Marshall (April 2023)
- The Black Archive #65: The Myth Makers by Ian Potter (June 2023)
- The Black Archive #66: The Greatest Show in the Galaxy by Dale Smith (August 2023)
- The Black Archive #67: The Edge of Destruction by Simon Guerrier (October 2023)
- The Black Archive #68: The Happiness Patrol by Mike Stack (December 2023)
- The Black Archive #69: Midnight by Philip Purser-Hallard (February 2024)
- The Black Archive #70: Ascension of the Cybermen / The Timeless Children by Ryan Bradley (April 2024)
- The Black Archive #71: The Aztecs by Doris V Sutherland (June 2024)
- The Black Archive #72: Silence in the Library / The Forest of the Dead by Dale Smith (August 2024)
- The Black Archive #73: Under the Lake / Before the Flood by Ryan C Parrey and Kevin S Decker (October 2024)
- The Black Archive #74: A Christmas Carol by Jamie Beckwith and Leslie Grace McMurtry (December 2024)
- The Black Archive #75: Silver Nemesis by James Cooray Smith (February 2025)
- The Black Archive #76: Logopolis by Jonathan Hay (April 2025)
- The Black Archive #77: Castrovalva by Andrew Orton (June 2025)
- The Black Archive #78: The Devil's Chord by Dale Smith (August 2025)
- The Black Archive #79: The Mysterious Planet by Jez Strickley (October 2025)
- The Black Archive #80: Mawdryn Undead by Kara Dennison (December 2025)
- The Black Archive #81: The Ark by Philip Purser-Hallard (February 2026)
- The Black Archive #82: The Daleks by Oliver Wake (April 2026)
- The Black Archive #83: The Web Planet by Brigid Cherry (June 2026)
- The Black Archive #84: The Invasion by Stephen Hatcher (August 2026)
- The Black Archive #85: Frontios by Paul Driscoll (October 2026)
