= Nick Hallard =

British artist (born 1975)

Nick Hallard (born 1975) is an artist based in Worthing in the United Kingdom, known primarily for his work on pub signs. He is the owner of Eyebright Murals, which supplies his hand-painted signs to the inn trade in the UK and beyond, as well as to private and specialist customers. His commissions include a sign for the Duck and Cover, the staff bar in the United States embassy in Kabul.

He has also carried out restoration work on 1920s lead frescoes for Worthing Borough Council, and supplied mural installations for Great Ormond Street children's hospital's Christmas parties for past and present patients in 2006 and 2007. His older brother Philip Purser-Hallard is a science fiction author, and Nick Hallard provided illustrated endpieces for his anthology More Tales of the City, as well as illustrations for his novel Of the City of the Saved...

A graduate in Media Arts from Royal Holloway University, Nick Hallard has also acted in short films and acted as production designer for the independent thriller Project Assassin. He appears as an extra in The Borrowers and Kenneth Branagh's Hamlet.
