= Philip Purser-Hallard =

British SF/ crime writer (born 1971)

Philip Purser-Hallard (born 1971 as Philip Hallard) is a fantasy, science fiction and crime author described by the British Fantasy Society as "the best kept secret in British genre writing".

His Devices Trilogy, beginning with The Pendragon Protocol, is an urban fantasy thriller series which combines Arthurian myth with issues of modern British politics and identity. The British Fantasy Society said that the first novel's "writing is crisp and clever, the plotting devoid of flab and the cast of characters appealing, interesting and consistent", and that it was based on "that rarest of fantasy beasts – an original idea".

He has a long association with Doctor Who licensed fiction. From 2015 he is the editor of The Black Archive, a series of book-length critical studies of individual Doctor Who episodes and stories. The series is published by Obverse Books, and features contributions from Simon Bucher-Jones, Simon Guerrier, Kate Orman and others. Purser-Hallard has written or contributed to six of the books. He has also written short stories and four novels featuring Sherlock Holmes.

Purser-Hallard received his doctorate in English literature at Oxford University. His DPhil thesis, The Relationship between Creator and Creature in Science Fiction, examined how British and American science fiction of the nineteenth and twentieth centuries explored the relationship between humanity and a putative creating deity through stories about the creation of sentient individuals by scientists, working from Mary Shelley's Frankenstein through to recent authors like Bruce Sterling, William Gibson and Dan Simmons. He also has interests in eschatological science fiction, as seen in his Faction Paradox novel, Of the City of the Saved.

Purser-Hallard has given three talks at the liberal Christian Greenbelt festival, all on the intersections of science fiction and religious themes. Between 2006 and 2009 he wrote a regular column on science fiction and faith for Surefish, the ISP and webzine arm of Christian Aid. From 2009 to 2012 he published regular 140-character microfictions on Twitter, under the username trapphic.

His brother Nick Hallard, an artist, provided endpieces for the More Tales of the City collection and unofficial illustrations for Purser-Hallard's Of the City of the Saved... web pages.

== Bibliography ==
=== Novels ===
- Of the City of the Saved... (Mad Norwegian Press 2004), a novel in the Faction Paradox series
- The Pendragon Protocol (Snowbooks 2014), the first novel in the Devices Trilogy
- The Locksley Exploit (Snowbooks 2015), the second novel in the Devices Trilogy
- Trojans (Snowbooks 2016), the third novel in the Devices Trilogy
- Sherlock Holmes: The Vanishing Man (Titan Books 2019; Italian translation L'Uomo Che Scompare Il Giallo Mondadori 2023)
- Sherlock Holmes: The Spider's Web (Titan Books 2020)
- Sherlock Holmes: Masters of Lies (Titan Books 2022)
- Sherlock Holmes: The Monster of the Mere (Titan Books 2023; Italian translation Il Mostro del Lago Il Giallo Mondadori 2024))

=== Novellas ===
- Peculiar Lives (Telos Publishing 2005), a novella in the Time Hunter series
- Nursery Politics, a novella (alongside others by Kate Orman and Jonathan Blum) in Nobody's Children (Big Finish Productions 2007), an anthology in the Bernice Summerfield series
- Predating the Predators, a novella (alongside others by Mags L Halliday and Kelly Hale) in The Vampire Curse (Big Finish Productions 2008), a Bernice Summerfield anthology
- Horizon, or Señor 105 contra las Momias Locas de Odinhotep, (Manleigh Books, 2013), an e-novella in the Periodic Adventures of Señor 105 series

=== Anthologies as editor ===
- Tales of the City (Obverse Books 2012), the first City of the Saved anthology
- More Tales of the City (Obverse Books 2013), the second City of the Saved anthology
- Tales of the Great Detectives (Obverse Books 2014), the third City of the Saved anthology, featuring multiple Sherlock Holmeses
- Iris Wildthyme of Mars (Obverse Books 2014), an Iris Wildthyme anthology set on Mars
- Furthest Tales of the City (Obverse Books 2015), the fourth City of the Saved anthology
- Tales of the Civil War (Obverse Books 2017), the fifth City of the Saved anthology
- Forgotten Lives (Obverse Books 2020), unlicensed Doctor Who anthology for charity
- Forgotten Lives 2 (Obverse Books 2022), unlicensed Doctor Who anthology for charity
- Forgotten Lives 3 (Obverse Books 2023), unlicensed Doctor Who anthology for charity

=== Short fiction ===
- Various entries in The Book of the War (Mad Norwegian Press 2002, edited by Lawrence Miles), an anthology in encyclopaedia form belonging to the Faction Paradox series
- Scapegoat in Emerge (Subway 2003, edited by Jane Campion and Jude Simpson), an anthology of poetry, prose and drama
- Sex Secrets of the Robot Replicants in A Life Worth Living (Big Finish Productions 2004, edited by Simon Guerrier), a Bernice Summerfield anthology. Sex Secrets of the Robot Replicants was reprinted as a prelude to the novel The Two Jasons by Dave Stone (Big Finish Productions 2007)
- Minions of the Moon in Wildthyme on Top (Big Finish Productions 2005, edited by Paul Magrs)
- The Long Midwinter in Short Trips: The History of Christmas (Big Finish Productions 2005, edited by Simon Guerrier), a Doctor Who anthology
- The Ruins of Time in Short Trips: Time Signature (Big Finish Productions 2006, edited by Simon Guerrier), a Doctor Who anthology
- Future Relations (co-written with Nick Wallace) and five pieces under the umbrella title Perspectives in Collected Works (Big Finish Productions 2006, edited by Nick Wallace), a Bernice Summerfield anthology
- Battleship Anathema in Iris Wildthyme and the Celestial Omnibus (Obverse Books 2009, edited by Paul Magrs and Stuart Douglas)
- A Hundred Words from a Civil War in A Romance in Twelve Parts (Obverse Books 2011, edited by Lawrence Miles and Stuart Douglas)
- De Umbris Idearum in Burning with Optimism's Flames (Obverse Books 2012, edited by Jay Eales).
- The Adventure of the Professor's Bequest in Further Encounters of Sherlock Holmes (Titan Books 2014, edited by George Mann)
- Green Mars Blues in Iris Wildthyme of Mars (Obverse Books 2014, edited by Philip Purser-Hallard)
- The Second Mask in Further Associates of Sherlock Holmes (Titan Books 2017, edited by George Mann)
- T. memeticus: A Morphology in The Book of the Enemy (Obverse Books 2018, edited by Simon Bucher-Jones)
- The Elementary Problem in Sherlock Holmes: A Detective's Life (Titan Books 2022, edited by Martin Rosenstock)

=== Criticism ===
- "Cybernetic godhead": the relationship between creator and creature in the science fiction of William Gibson, in the journal ManuScript (1999)
- A Momentary Stay Against Confusion, an interview with Dan Simmons (2003)
- The Drugs Did Work, an article on Philip K. Dick, in The Guardian (12 August 2006)
- The Black Archive #4: Dark Water / Death in Heaven (March 2016)
- The Black Archive #13: Human Nature / The Family of Blood (with Naomi Jacobs) (September 2017)
- The Black Archive #34: Battlefield (August 2019)
- The Black Archive #56: The Haunting of Villa Diodati (December 2021)
- Once, Upon Time, a chapter in The Black Archive #63: Flux (February 2023)
- The Black Archive #69: Midnight (February 2024)
- The Black Archive #81: The Ark (expected February 2026)
