= Daniel O'Mahony =

Daniel O'Mahony (born 24 July 1973) is a half-British half-Irish author, born in Croydon. He is the oldest of five children, his siblings including Eoin O'Mahony of the band Hamfatter, and Madeleine O'Mahony, who has designed and made hats for Catherine, Duchess of Cambridge.

== Biography ==
O'Mahony's first professionally published work were original Doctor Who novels in the 1990s. A fan of the series, when he was still at school he had pitched ideas to the BBC for episodes and also wrote to Nigel Robinson – the then editor of Target Books novelizations – asking to write the novelization of some of the few outstanding television stories yet to be adapted.

Following the announcement of Virgin's intention to start publishing the New Adventures, O'Mahony submitted a number of proposals for novels, the third of which (Falls the Shadow) was accepted and published in November 1994. This was the only book that O'Mahony wrote for the New Adventures. However, in July 1994 Virgin began publishing the Missing Adventures, and O'Mahony pitched a novel for this series and was accepted. The novel, The Man in the Velvet Mask was published in February 1996.

O'Mahony did not write any novels for BBC Books' Past Doctor Adventures and Eighth Doctor Adventures ranges. In fact since 1996 he has written only two traditional Doctor Who adventure stories, most prominently the Big Finish audio story Return to the Web Planet (2007). However, he also wrote the short story "Nothing at the End of the Lane" (in Short Trips and Side Steps in March 2000) and the 2003 novella The Cabinet of Light for Telos as part of their range of Doctor Who novellas. These are fabulations based around Doctor Who elements rather than Doctor Who stories proper, and feature the Doctor minimally if at all.

The Cabinet of Light introduced the characters of Honoré Lechasseur and Emily Blandish, who were later to star in Telos' Time Hunter range of novellas. O'Mahony had very little creative involvement with this series. An audiobook of The Cabinet of Light was later released as part of the Time Hunter series and with minor textual changes to distinguish it from Doctor Who.

In 2002, O'Mahony was one of the writers who contributed to Mad Norwegian Press's fictional encyclopaedia The Book of the War, the first in their Faction Paradox series headed by Lawrence Miles. He followed this up in 2004 with the sixth installment in the popular Kaldor City series, Storm Mine which to date is the final installment of that series. He has also written the audio dramas Timeless Passages, The Tub Full of Cats and Absence for Big Finish Productions's Bernice Summerfield series.

His first original novel Force Majeure was published by Telos in August 2007. This was followed by Newtons Sleep, published in the loosely connected Faction Paradox series from new publishers Random Static, published in January 2008. He has also written one comic strip, Sisters of the Head, illustrated by Terry Wiley and published in The Girly Comic. In 2010 he contributed stories to several of Piper Books' Mature Reading Instruction series of teenage and adult literacy titles.

He has stated his literary influences include authors such as Angela Carter, John Crowley, Neil Gaiman, Grant Morrison (on his early work, though he has since said he no longer regards Morrison as an important influence), Thomas Pynchon and Gene Wolfe.

== Bibliography ==
Novels/Novellas

- Falls the Shadow (Virgin, 1994)
- The Man in the Velvet Mask (Virgin, 1996)
- The Book of the War Contributor (Mad Norwegian Press, 2002)
- The Cabinet of Light (Telos Publishing, 2003)
- Force Majeure (Telos Publishing, 2007)
- Newtons Sleep (Random Static, 2008)

Audio Drama

- Kaldor City: Storm Mine (Magic Bullet Productions, 2004)
- Bernice Summerfield: Timeless Passages (Big Finish Productions, 2006)
- Bernice Summerfield: The Tub Full of Cats (Big Finish Productions, 2007)
- Doctor Who: Return to the Web Planet (Big Finish Productions, 2007)
- Bernice Summerfield: Absence (Big Finish Productions, 2009)

Piper Books

- The Pirate Queen (2011)
- Starship (2011)
- Robot City (2011)
