= The Pendragon Protocol =

- Cover of The Pendragon Protocol
- Author: Philip Purser-Hallard
- Language: English
- Genre: Urban fantasy thriller
- Publisher: Snowbooks
- Publication date: 2014
- Publication place: United Kingdom
- Pages: 350 pp
- ISBN: 978-1-909679-17-7
- Followed by: The Locksley Exploit, Trojans

The Pendragon Protocol is an urban fantasy thriller by Philip Purser-Hallard, published in 2014 by Snowbooks. It is the first volume in the Devices Trilogy.

== Plot summary ==
The novel introduces the Circle, a Crown-sponsored British paramilitary organisation the members of which take inspiration from King Arthur's Knights of the Round Table. The "devices" of the title are both the heraldic devices the Knights of the Circle bear on their riot shields, and the emblematic identities of particular Arthurian knights (identified as semi-autonomous archetypes or memes), whose stories they continually re-enact.

The protagonist, Jory Taylor, bears the device of Sir Gawain, which puts him in direct conflict with an eco-activist cell called the Green Chapel and led by the avatar of the Green Knight. The political assumptions underlying the Circle's model of heroism are increasingly questioned as it is revealed that the Green Chapel take their inspiration from a radically different British legend, that of Robin Hood.

== Critical reception ==
The Encyclopedia of Science Fiction wrote that the novel's "story is modestly softened [...] giving its telling a Young Adult focus". The British Fantasy Society review stated that the novel's "writing is crisp and clever, the plotting devoid of flab and the cast of characters appealing, interesting and consistent", and that it was based on "that rarest of fantasy beasts – an original idea."

== Sequels ==
A sequel, The Locksley Exploit, was published in 2015. Trojans, the third book in the trilogy, followed in 2016.
