= J. Clive Matthews =

James Clive-Matthews, better known as J Clive Matthews, is a British writer, editor, blogger and online content consultant. In 2008 he was shortlisted for the inaugural UACES-Reuters Reporting Europe Award, the only independent journalist on a five-person list that included the BBC's Europe Editor Mark Mardell and the Europe Editor of The Economist. In 2010 he was named winner of the "Internet" category in the European Parliament Prize for Journalism.

Writing under the pseudonym "Nosemonkey" he is the author of the blog Nosemonkey's EUtopia, for which he has been shortlisted for awards by The Guardian and Deutsche Welle. Formerly known as Europhobia, the blog rose to prominence for its coverage of the 7 July 2005 London bombings and subsequent campaign to raise money to buy emergency service workers a "thank-you" pint of beer. In 2007 it was named one of the UK's best blogs by the Metro newspaper, which said: "In the often fractious and shouty world of Britain's political blogs, J Clive Matthews' balanced, informed and entertaining writing on British and European politics manages to rise above the murk – whatever part of the political spectrum you live on".

Matthews is a contributor to the Times Literary Supplement, the Press Gazette, the Guardian and openDemocracy among others, and is the co-author, with Jim Smith, of two books in Virgin Books' "Film series", one on director Tim Burton, the other on The Lord of the Rings.

He is a cofounder of the "Ideas on Europe" initiative, managed by UACES (the academic association for Contemporary European Studies) - the body responsible for the Journal of Common Market Studies. The initiative is a blog hosting service which provides an "independent forum for informed analysis, comment and debate" concerning EU affairs.
