= Simon Bucher-Jones =

British writer

Simon Bucher-Jones (born Simon Jones, 6 September 1964) is an author, poet, and amateur actor. He is best known for his Doctor Who novels for Virgin and BBC and as a contributor to the Faction Paradox spin-off series. Between 1988 and Dec 2018, he worked for the Home Office, in a variety of casework, admin, IT support, and planning positions. From Jan 2019 he was a freelance writer (augmenting this with work as a scare actor (2019, 2021, 2022, 2023), for the Office of National Statistics (Census officer 2021), and for the Isle of Wight Council (Public Realm Assistant 2021, Regulatory Compliance Assistant 2023.))

Jones was born in Liverpool. He is known for a hard SF approach. He has written Cthulhu Mythos short stories and reviewed books for the Fortean Times and for small press papers. His poetry has appeared in the Journal of the British Fantasy Society.

He has been Treasurer of Age Concern Shanklin since 1 April 2022, and is a founder member of the Tide Nor Time Players. In 2024 the Ventnor Fringe, Tide Nor Time Players production Wyrd Wight Tales, was co-written by him, and the 2026 Ventor Fringe production was his version of The King In Yellow.

== Doctor Who ==
Novels:

- The Death of Art (Virgin 1996) (Seventh Doctor, Roz, Chris Cwej)
- Ghost Devices (Virgin 1997) (Bernice Summerfield)
- The Taking of Planet 5 (BBC 1999) (Eighth Doctor, Fitz, Compassion; written with Mark Clapham)
- Grimm Reality (BBC 2001) (Eighth Doctor, Fitz, Anji; written with Kelly Hale)

Short stories:

- War Crimes in Short Trips (BBC 1998)
- The Thousand Years Of Christmas in The History of Christmas (Big Finish 2005)
- The Painting On The Stair in the Bernice Summerfield collection Collected Works (Big Finish 2006)
- The Weasels and the Warpfield in the Chris Cwej collection Cwej Down the Middle (Arcbeatle Press 2020)
- I Remember _______ in the Chris Cwej collection Cwej Down the Middle (Arcbeatle Press 2020)
- When Johnny Comes Marching Home in the Paradise Towers collection Build High For Happiness (Obverse Books Dec 2021)

TV criticism:

- The Black Archive #5: Image of the Fendahl (Obverse Books May 2016)
- The Black Archive #17: The Impossible Planet/The Satan Pit (Obverse Books Mar 2018)
- The Black Archive #53: The Hand of Fear (Obverse Books July 2021)

== Faction Paradox ==
- The Book of the War (2002) (contributor) While the entries in The Book of The War are anonymous it is known that Simon Bucher-Jones wrote more words in it than any other single contributor after editor Lawrence Miles.
- Short story After The Velvet Aeon in Burning with Optimism's Flames (Obverse Books 2012)
- Short story Double Trouble At The Parasites On The Proletariat Club in More Tales Of The City (Obverse Books 2013)
- Novel The Brakespeare Voyage Faction Paradox (Obverse Books 2013) (With Jonathan Dennis)
- The Book of the Enemy (Obverse Book 2018) (Editor/contributor).
- Short story Stories of The Space Psychopaths The Boulevard Vol.2 (Obverse books 2024) (Editor/Contributor)

== Iris Wildthyme ==
- Short story Riviera Showdown in Iris: Abroad (Obverse Books 2011)
- Short story Her and Allan in Wildthyme in Purple (Obverse Books 2011)
- Short story Iris : Chess Mistress of Mars in Iris Wildthyme on Mars (Obverse Books 2014)
- Short story Whatever Happened to Maybe Jane? in Iris Wildthyme: Locked In Space (Obverse Books 2023)

== Professor Howe (A series of Doctor Who parodies published in support of Children in Need) ==
- Novella #8 "Professor Howe and the Furious Foam" (Long Scarf Publications, 2020)

== Self-Published by Pantechnikon Press ==
Poetry

- Godzilla In East Anglia, a collection available via Lulu etc. (2010).
- Deathwatch At Lake Saguaro, a collection available via Lulu etc. (2015).
- The Lantern and The Lighthouse, a collection available via Lulu etc. (2020).

Cthulhu Mythos

- The Temple Of Dagon, written in 2004 for the proposed Chaosium anthology The Dagon Cycle, now available as an ebook via Kindle (2013).

The Yellow Mythos

- Le Roi de Jaune - THE KING IN YELLOW - a full French and English text of the cursed play with scholarly introduction, essays, and annotations" (Hardback, and Paperback versions now available Lulu 2015)
- THE KING IN YELLOW - A NEW TRANSLATION - ebook of the above, available from Lulu and Amazon (Nov 2015)
- THE KING IN YELLOW - Comic Issue 1 - graphic novel version of the above in 4 parts, available from Lulu and Amazon (Apr 2019)
- THE KING IN YELLOW - Comic Issue 2 - graphic novel version of the above in 4 parts, available from Lulu and Amazon (Apr 2020)
- THE KING IN YELLOW - Act One - Omnibus of issues 1 & 2, available from Lulu and Amazon (Apr 2020)
- THE KING IN YELLOW - Comic Issue 3 - graphic novel version of the above in 4 parts, available from Lulu and Amazon (June 2021)
- THE KING IN YELLOW - Comic Issue 4 - graphic novel version of the above in 4 parts, available from Lulu and Amazon (Apr 2022)
- THE KING IN YELLOW - Act Two - Omnibus of issues 3 & 4, available from Lulu and Amazon (May 2022)
- THE KING IN YELLOW - OMNIBUS - Full omnibus of issues 1 to 4 with all new redraw art, available Lulu (2025)

The First Ether Series (mash-up novels set in an alternative space-faring 19th century)

- Charles Dickens' Martian Notes, Lulu etc. (2015).
- Wilkie Collins' The Evil Genius of Venus - Book One: The Wreck of the lift-barque John Jerniman, Lulu etc. (2016).
- Wilkie Collins' The Evil Genius of Venus - Book Two: The Daemon Doctor, Lulu etc. (2020).

== Non-series, novels and stories ==
- "The Ghost of Christmas Sideways" (2012) (In Resurrection Engines: Steampunk Anthology edited by Scott Harrison)
- Harlic - A Story Of A Grey Seal in Storyteller (2013) (contributor)
- A Family Resemblance in Associates of Sherlock Holmes (Titan Books) (2016) (contributor)
- Clueroborus in 10,000 Dawns: Poor Man's Illiad (2018) (contributor)
- The Immortal Seaton Begg part of Obverse Sextet (Obverse Books) (2019) (4 stories / novella)
- The Case of the Dead Marshes in "Sherlock Holmes and the Occult Detectives IV (Belanger Books) (2022) (contributor)
- A Hank of Hair in "Occult Detective Magazine#9 (2023) (contributor)

== Cthulhu Mythos and other horror work ==
- (with James Ambeuhl) The Case of the Curiously Competent Conjuror in the collection Lin Carter's Anton Zarnak, Supernatural Sleuth.
- Some Thoughts On The Problem Of Order in the collection Hardboiled Cthulhu.
- Things To Do In Pornutopia When You're Dead, a comic strip in Violent #13, [Simon Bucher-Jones writer].
- The Blues of the Endless Sky in the collection The Chromatic Court (2019)
- A Madman among Mummers in "Shadows over Avalon Volume 1 (18thWall Productions) (2022) (contributor)

== Charity and/or fan publications ==
- At the Academy in Drabble Who (1993)
- The Big Cat in The Cat Who Walked Through Time (2000)
- In the "Days of the 'Days of the Days of Our Lives'" in Missing Pieces (2001)
- Tempus Fugit written with James Ambeuhl in Missing Pieces (2001)
- At the Beach in Lifedeath (2001)
- The Pulp Of The Black Lotus in Walking In Eternity (2001)
- Dial M for Metaphysics in the Craig Hinton memorial Fanthology Shelf Life (2008)
- Two Poems in Shooty Dog Thing: 2th & Claw (2011)
- The Ox Bow Train in A Target for Tommy (2016)
- Doctor Who And The Exile From Hell in A Second Target for Tommy (2018)
- The Citizens of VOR in Dr Who: Journey Into Time (2020)
- Tomorrow('s World) the (Roland) Rat in The Curse of Fanfic (2020)
- The Knocking in the Mineshaft in Forgotten Lives (2021)
- Iris the Outsider in Bafflement and Devotion - Iris at the Edges (2021)
- Sarah Jane and The Sub-Urban Ghost in Sarah Jane Smith - Roving Reporter (2021)
- The Hand of Night and Shadow in Forgotten Lives 2 (2022)
- The Seven Scholars and the Storyteller in Forgotten Lives 3 (2023)
- The New Machines in Dr Who: The Brink of Disaster (2024)
- Sarah Jane and The Cliffside Communion in Sarah Jane Smith - Roving Reporter II (2025)
- The Zodina Compact in Forgotten Lives 4 (Forthcoming 2026)

== Acting ==
=== Charity theatrical performances ===
- Jacob in Joseph (St Michael's Church 2007)

=== Pantomimes with Purley Pantaloons ===
- The Slave Seller in Sinbad the Sailor (2008)
- The Stage Manager in Little Dead Riding Hood (2008)
- King Rattle in Dick Whittington Goes West (2009)
- Mister Shock in Robinson Crusoe: A Space Oddity (2010)
- Asbad: King of Thieves in Ali Baba and the 40 Thieves (2011)
- Gary: the Nymph in Babez in the Wood (2012)
- Guy of Gisborne in Little Red Riding Hood (2013)
- Abanazar in Aladdin in Old London Town (2014)
- Humphrey, and Minion/Chorus in Jack and the Beanstalk (2015)
- Prince Not-So Charming in Sleeping Beauty (2016)
- Raff-elle, and Villager/Chorus in The Lie-On King (2017)
- Deer, and Royal Servant in Cinderella (2018)

=== Theatrical performances ===
- Voice off, and Ghost of Christmas Future (Shared part) in The Farnham Avenue Housing Estate Townswomen's Guild Dramatic Society's Production of A Christmas Carol (Bembridge Little Theatre Company, 2019)
- Marley's Ghost/Narrator in A Christmas Carol (Stage performance, Tide Nor Time Players, 2022)
- Smuggler, Village Chorus, and E. Hartnell in Molly Downer (Musical, Tide Nor Time Players, 2023 - Ventnor Fringe)
- Gladys Pearlclutcher in Lance McCrack and The Dr X-Mass Adventure (Musical, Tide Nor Time Players, 2023)
- Narrator, Drunken Husband, Lost Child in Wyrd Wight Tales (Ventnor Fringe, Tide Nor Time Players, 2024)
- Narrator, Ubu, in The King in Yellow (Ventnor Fringe, Tide Nor Time Players, 2026)

=== Professional performances ===
- Mercreature 1 in Amphibious (Terror Island, Blackgang Chine, 2019)
- Professor Hieronymus Carter in Hexcavation (Terror Island, Blackgang Chine, 2021)
- Marley's Ghost in Stave Two, Part 1: A Christmas Carol (Tales of Wihtlore: Folklore and Stories from a Sacred Isle - Apple Podcast, YouTube, Radio Solent, 2021)
- Man One in Stave Four, Part 1: A Christmas Carol (Tales of Wihtlore: Folklore and Stories from a Sacred Isle - Apple Podcast, YouTube, Radio Solent, 2021)
- Dr. Mordrake in Blind Alley (Terror Island, Blackgang Chine, Press Night 2022)
- Old Sweeny in Blind Alley (Terror Island, Blackgang Chine, Main Run 2022)
- Gideon the Apothecary in Blind Alley (Terror Island, Blackgang Chine, Press Night and Main Run 2023)
