= Death in Heaven =

252b – "Death in Heaven"
- Doctor Who episode

Cast
- Doctor: Peter Capaldi – Twelfth Doctor
- Companion: Jenna Coleman – Clara Oswald
- Others: Samuel Anderson – Danny Pink; Michelle Gomez – Missy; Chris Addison – Seb; Ingrid Oliver – Osgood; Jemma Redgrave – Kate Stewart; Sanjeev Bhaskar – Colonel Ahmed; James Pearse – Graham; Antonio Bourouphael – Boy; Shane Keogh-Grenade – Teenage boy; Katie Bignell – Teenage girl; Jeremiah Krage – Cyberman; Nicholas Briggs – Voice of the Cybermen; Nick Frost – Santa Claus

Production
- Directed by: Rachel Talalay
- Written by: Steven Moffat
- Script editor: David P Davis
- Produced by: Peter Bennett
- Executive producers: Steven Moffat; Brian Minchin
- Music by: Murray Gold
- Series: Series 8
- Running time: 2nd of 2-part story, 57 minutes
- First broadcast: 8 November 2014

Chronology
← Preceded by "Dark Water"	Followed by → "Last Christmas"

"Death in Heaven" is the twelfth and final episode of the eighth series of the British science fiction television programme Doctor Who. It was first broadcast on BBC One on 8 November 2014. The episode was written by showrunner Steven Moffat and directed by Rachel Talalay. It is the second of a two-part story; the first episode "Dark Water" aired on 1 November.

In the episode, Missy (Michelle Gomez), an evil alien time traveller (also known as the Master) resurrects the dead as an army of cyborgs called Cybermen as a gift to her former friend the Doctor (Peter Capaldi), intending to prove that they are alike.

The episode was watched by 7.60 million viewers and received positive reviews, with critics praising its writing, direction, and acting. Gomez was consistently highly praised in reviews, with many calling her a highlight of the eighth series.

The title sequence was subtly different for this episode. In the cold open, Clara tells the Cybermen that she is the Doctor to convince them to keep her alive. The image of Peter Capaldi's eyes in the opening credits is replaced with one of Jenna Coleman's eyes and Coleman's name precedes Capaldi's.

== Plot ==
Cybermen controlled by Missy take to the air and explode over 91 populated areas in the British Isles, creating clouds that rain "Cyberpollen" that resurrects the dead as Cybermen, including Danny. Similar events occur all over the world. UNIT takes Missy and the Twelfth Doctor into custody on board a UNIT plane where, per incursion protocols, the Doctor is inducted President of Earth.

Clara stalls the Cybermen inside St Paul's Cathedral to keep herself alive by pretending to be the Doctor. She is saved by Danny, who retains his personality. Clara awakens at a graveyard where Danny reveals his identity.

Missy escapes capture and kills UNIT scientist Osgood. A horde of flying Cybermen attack the plane. Clara calls the Doctor on the TARDIS's phone. Missy admits she gave Clara that phone number to bring her and the Doctor together. (Note: A "woman in the shop" who gave Clara the number is first mentioned in the 2013 episode "The Bells of Saint John".) She then blasts open one of the plane's cargo doors, sending Chief Scientific Officer Kate Stewart (Note: The end credits credit the character as "Kate Lethbridge-Stewart", but on screen she addresses herself as "Kate Stewart".) plummeting towards the ground while Missy teleports to safety. The Doctor takes the TARDIS to the graveyard. Because Danny cannot see Missy's plans without activating an inhibitor which deletes Danny's emotions, Clara activates it. Danny reveals that a second rainfall will convert living humans into Cybermen.

Missy proposes the Doctor control the Cyberman army to prove he and Missy are the same. The Doctor rejects the gift, accepting he is not a "good man", (Note: The Doctor questions whether or not he is a "good man" in the 2014 episode "Into the Dalek", and denies being a "hero" in the 2014 episode "Robot of Sherwood".) and passes the control bracelet to Danny, who has kept his personality. Danny leads the Cybermen into the sky, where they explode, stopping the rainfall. Missy claims the planet Gallifrey is in its original location. Clara tries to kill Missy for Danny's death, but the Doctor stops her to prevent her from becoming corrupted by revenge. Brigadier Lethbridge-Stewart—brought back as a Cyberman—vaporises Missy instead. He gestures towards his unconscious daughter Kate whom he had saved.

Danny contacts Clara from the Nethersphere, a data cloud storing recently deceased minds intended for the Cyberman army. Having only the power to bring one person back before the Nethersphere shuts down, Danny resurrects the boy he accidentally killed. He asks Clara to return the boy to his parents. Clara later meets with the Doctor. Assuming Danny is alive again, the Doctor interrupts Clara to lie about finding Gallifrey and his plans to return home. Clara lies that she and Danny are going to be fine.

In the mid-credits scene, Santa Claus knocks on the TARDIS door to tell the Doctor neither he nor Clara are fine.

=== Continuity ===
As the first full episode to feature Missy with her true identity as the Master revealed, "Death in Heaven" features various references to previous episodes featuring the Master. Osgood refers to previous incidents on Earth featuring the Master, including his tenure as Prime Minister in "The Sound of Drums" (2007). When boarding the airbase, the Doctor believes that he is going to the Valiant, an airborne aircraft carrier partially designed by the Master in "The Sound of Drums". Missy uses the phrase "Oh, my giddy aunt", an expression associated with the Second Doctor.

The Cyberman head that Kate reveals is from the 1968 episode The Invasion, which also featured Cybermen invading near St. Paul's Cathedral.

The location of the planet Gallifrey—"in the constellation of Kasterborous" at galactic coordinates 10-0-11-00:02—was first mentioned in the Fourth Doctor story Pyramids of Mars (1975).

== Production ==
The read through for "Death in Heaven" took place on 12 June 2014. Production of the episode overlapped with "Dark Water"; the opening scene involving UNIT was filmed prior to the final scene in the previous episode. Principal photography for the episode concluded on 21 July 2014.

The scene in which Missy is tied to a chair on board the plane was written as a parallel to the Master tying the Doctor to a chair in "The End of Time".

== Broadcast and reception ==
Overnight ratings estimate that the episode was watched by 5.45 million viewers. The finale was watched by a total of 7.60 million viewers. The episode received an AI score of 83. This was a lower score than the first part of the story received.

=== Critical reception ===
Professional ratings
Review scores
Source	Rating
The A.V. Club	A−
Paste Magazine	9.1
SFX Magazine	4./5 stars
TV Fanatic	4.8/5 stars
CultBox	5/5 stars
IndieWire	A+
IGN	9.1
New York Magazine	4/5 stars
Radio Times	5/5 stars
The Daily Telegraph	4/5 stars

The episode received highly positive reviews. Dan Martin writing for The Guardian praised Michelle Gomez's performance, noting that she "preens with a perfect combination of madness and malevolence that is just so Master". He also notes that her demise is a nod to the Roger Delgado era of the Master. He summed up the final as "Action-packed, uncompromising, filled with genuine emotion". While writing for The Daily Telegraph, Michael Hogan noted that Danny Pink got a "stupendous send-off" and that it would be a shame if Missy did not reappear in the future. Hogan also loved the two nods to Nicholas Courtney who played Brigadier Lethbridge-Stewart. He gave the episode four stars out of five. Dave Golder, writing for SFX, gave the episode four stars out of five. He criticised some parts of the episode, including Danny's final moments in the graveyard, and he felt the episode was "less chilling than Dark Water". Overall, he stated "[it] was an immensely enjoyable series finale".

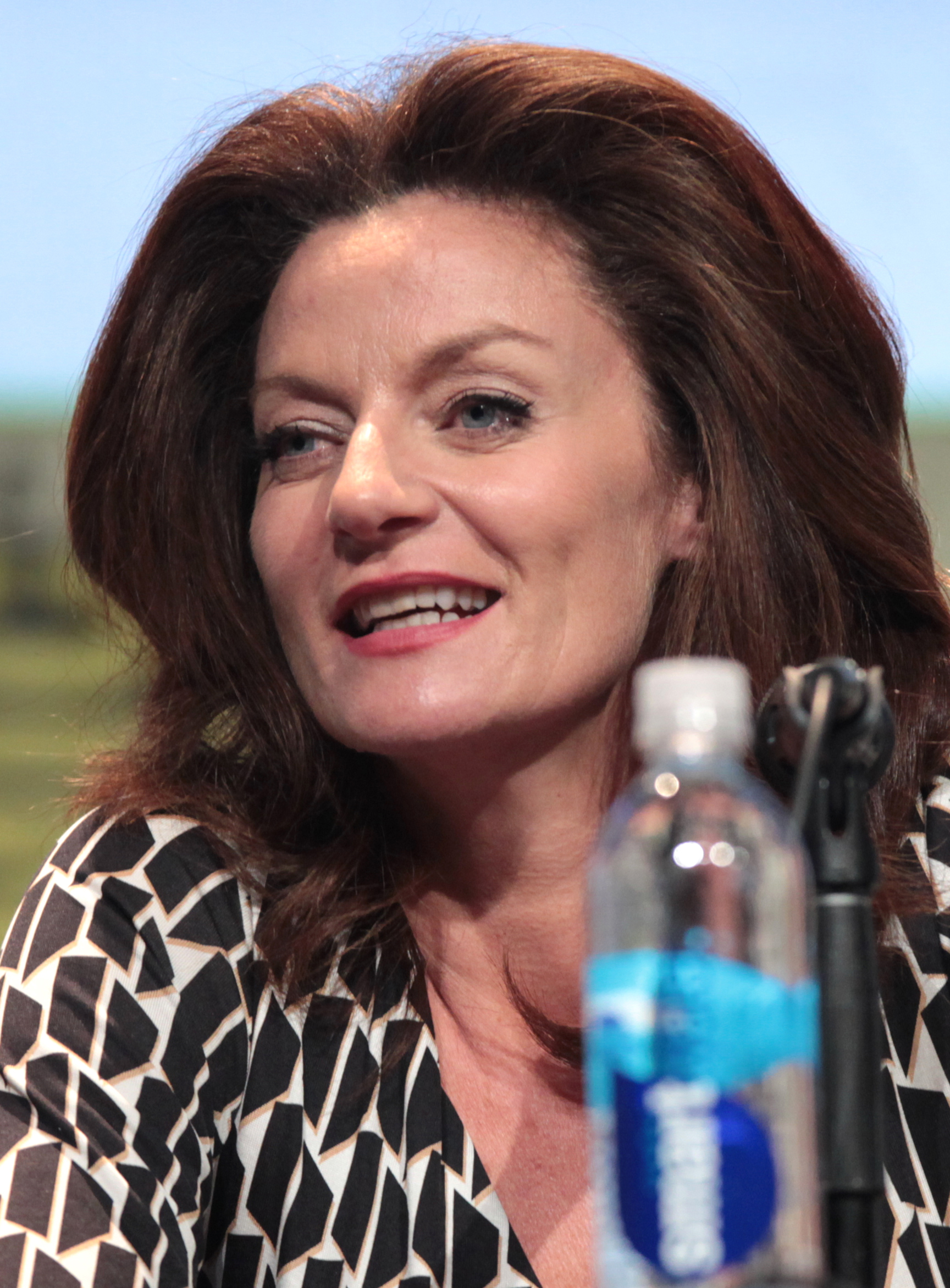
Michelle Gomez received widespread critical acclaim for her performance in the episode.

Writing for IGN, Matt Risley, gave the episode an "Amazing" 9.1, calling it "a powerful and emotional finale to Capaldi's masterful first season." He also praised Michelle Gomez for her performance, but criticised the use of the Cybermen and plot holes. On The A.V. Club, writer Alasdair Wilkins gave the episode A−, calling it a "bittersweet ending for the season". When commenting on the season as a whole, he said "we are left to ponder one of Doctor Who's most complex, emotionally rich seasons".

Simon Brew of Den of Geek gave a mixed to positive review. He praised Michelle Gomez's, Capaldi's and Jenna Coleman's performances, but was critical of the Cybermen, believing them to be the weakest of the three cliffhanger threads from the previous week. He was also critical of the pacing and some plot holes and threads that were slightly unbelievable, citing the falling Doctor homing into the TARDIS as the main culprit. He was disappointed with Sanjeev Bhaskar's limited role in the episode and lack of resolutions to certain plot points. Overall though, he believed it to be one of the better finales since the show returned in 2005.

The Register gave a generally negative review, with writer Brid-Aine Parnell saying "This finale couldn't lift itself up from the messy morass of the rest of the season… it didn't make sense, it was ridiculous and contrived and just not engaging." She was critical of plot holes in the episode and the fact no explanation was given for how the Master returned. She was however pleased with Gomez' performance believing it to be the best part of the episode, calling her "fantastic". Gavin Clarke said of the Doctor's "meltdown" in the TARDIS: "This was a [sic] unexpected moment, his console trashing made more powerful for its silence over swelling music" and of it overall "Did Death in Heaven succeed? Mostly 'yes', some grumbling 'no's' and a bit of breathing deeply and just letting it go". His colleague, Jennifer Baker, said "The rationale for clouds and rain and pollination was confused, but zombie Cybermen climbing out of graves was worth it!" Dan Wilson of Metro also gave a negative review, citing that it "left far too many threads hanging," but he too was positive about Michelle Gomez as the Master.

== Critical analysis ==
A book length study of the serial (covering both "Dark Water" and "Death in Heaven") was written by Philip Purser-Hallard, and published as part of The Black Archive series from Obverse Books in 2016.

The serial was covered in volume 79 of the Doctor Who: The Complete History book series, which reprinted Andrew Pixley's Archive features from Doctor Who Magazine and the various Doctor Who Magazine Special Editions, as well as new articles created specifically for the book.
