= James Cooray Smith =

British writer, born 1978

- Born: 1978 (age 47–48); Solihull, England
- Occupations: Writer, critic
- Writing career
- Pen name: Jim Smith
- Period: 1996-present

James Edward Cooray Smith (born in Solihull in 1978) is a British writer, critic and columnist. He has written for journals including New Statesman and Prospect. He has also contributed to the Doctor Who audio and DVD range.

== Career ==
Cooray Smith is of patrilineal Indian descent. A graduate of University College London, he has written radio drama and comedy, and has contributed to numerous news, film and science fiction magazines. He has a specific interest in British television history.

Asked about his long-term habit of co-writing with a variety of people, Cooray Smith commented: "I've written things with a lot of different people, partially because I'm a great believer in third brain theory, and partially as a series of attempts to disguise my own lack of talent!"

In 2017, he responded to the casting of Jodie Whittaker in Doctor Who by writing an article saying those who disagreed with the lead character's sex change were misogynistic. His article was entitled "Uncomfortable with a female Doctor Who? It’s time to admit your real motives".

== Bibliography ==
=== New Statesman Columns ===
http://www.newstatesman.com/writers/321282

=== Hero Collector Writer's Page ===
http://herocollector.com/en-gb/About/james-cooray-smith

=== Non-Fiction Books ===
- The Life and Trials of Ally McBeal (2000) (with Mark Clapham)
- Manhattan Dating Game: Sex and the City (2002)
- Tim Burton (2002) (with J Clive Matthews)
- Bond Films (2003) (with Stephen Lavington)
- George Lucas (2003)
- Gangster Films (2004)
- The Lord of the Rings: The Books, the Films, the Radio Series (2005) (with J Clive Matthews)
- Quentin Tarantino (2005)
- Who's Next? A Guide To Broadcast Doctor Who (2005) (with Mark Clapham and Eddie Robson)
- The Black Archive #2: The Massacre (2015)
- The Black Archive #14:The Ultimate Foe (2017)
- The Black Archive #40: The Underwater Menace (2020)
- The Black Archive #49: The Night of the Doctor (2023)
- The Black Archive #75: Silver Nemesis (2025)
- The Silver Archive #3:Sapphire and Steel Assignments 5 & 6 (2018)

=== Short fiction ===
- "A Gallery of Pigeons"' (2009) in Secret Histories
- "'Excalibur of Mars" (2009) in Present Danger
- "The Found World" (2010), in Miss Wildthyme and Friends Investigate

=== Radio and Audio work ===
==== That Mitchell and Webb Sound ====
Series Four (2009) (sketch writer)

==== Bernice Summerfield ====
- The Adventure of the Diogenes Damsel (2008)

==== Kaldor City ====
- Occam's Razor (2000) (with Alan Stevens)
- Hidden Persuaders (2003) (with Fiona Moore)

=== Doctor Who DVD Production History Notes ===
- The Twin Dilemma (2009)
- The Space Museum (2010)
- Underworld (Doctor Who) (2010)
- Kinda (2011)
- Snakedance (2011)
- The Ark (Doctor Who) (2011)
- The Sun Makers (2011)
