= Hope (Clapham novel) =

Doctor Who novel by Mark Clapham

- Author: Mark Clapham
- Series: Doctor Who book: Eighth Doctor Adventures
- Release number: 53
- Subject: Featuring: Eighth Doctor; Fitz and Anji
- Publisher: BBC Books
- Publication date: February 2002
- Pages: 249
- ISBN: 0-563-53846-5
- Preceded by: Mad Dogs and Englishmen
- Followed by: Anachrophobia

Hope is a BBC Books original novel written by Mark Clapham and based on the long-running British science fiction television series Doctor Who. It features the Eighth Doctor, Fitz and Anji.

== Plot ==
The Doctor tries to push the TARDIS to its limit, but is forced to land when it begins to break up. They land on the surface of a frozen sea of acid on the planet Endpoint, in the distant future. When the ice begins to break up, The Doctor, Fitz and Anji, flee to the nearby city of Hope, only to see the TARDIS sink to the bottom of the sea. On the city, a policeman investigating a decapitation explains that the planet is toxic, so the humans had to evolve to survive, but recently a serial killer has been decapitating people. The policeman then tells them to go to a casino for help. When they arrive The Doctor buys entry with an apple core (which is long extinct) from his pocket. Inside the casino, a group of cyborgs, calling themselves the Brotherhood of the Silver Fist, burst in and demand that the casino's owner, Silver, speaks to them. Silver, himself a cyborg, enters and drives the brotherhood out of the casino but not before talking to The Doctor. After learning that The Doctor can time travel, he offers to recover the TARDIS if The Doctor catches the murderer, which The Doctor agrees to.

While Fitz and Anji rest in the casino, The Doctor finds a used tranquilliser dart at a crime scene and deduces that the murders are part of a plan committed by a visitor to Endpoint. While Fitz tries to infiltrate the Brotherhood, Anji finds apple trees being cloned from the core. Silver explains that he was born in the 30th Century, and was enlisted into the military and given his implants to prolong his life from the birth defects he suffered. In 3006, he was sent to the future to collect technology to help in a war, but was unable to return, and became a businessman on Endpoint.

The Doctor learns that the people of Endpoint produce a hormone called Kallisti, which has similar effects to adrenaline, and the killer has been taking heads to give himself a permanent supply. The Doctor uses himself as bait, and when the killer attacks him, he overpowers him, only to discover that the killer is an inbred human. Then, other humans surround The Doctor and tranquillise him. Back at the casino, Anji asks Silver if he could clone her boyfriend Dave Young. Silver agrees, but demands that Anji provides him with data from the TARDIS so he can build his own time machine, which Anji agrees to. When his staff tell him that The Doctor has disappeared, Silver explains that he fitted The Doctor with a tracer, and he locates him on the sea bed. Silver then dives down to rescue The Doctor.

On sea bed, where The Doctor is being held in a bunker, the humans explain that they regard the people of Endpoint as mutants, and they believe that humans should be the dominant race, so they have been experimenting with Kallisti to improve humans. Suddenly, Silver attacks the bunker and kills the humans. Fitz contacts The Brotherhood and turns them against each other, but then the image of their cyborg Queen appears and orders Fitz's release. Fitz releases the Queen, who is actually one of Silver's staff, Miraso. She explains the Brotherhood was created by Silver to control rebels and keep the public's faith in Silver. In the Bunker, The Doctor and Silver find technology capable of reversing the pollution. When activated, the sea turns into water, and the air becomes breathable again. Fitz discovers that Silver has mutants with silver skin hidden in his casino and goes to investigate while Anji trades the data on the TARDIS so that the clone of Dave can be made.

The Doctor places Kallisti into the liquid computer of Silver's brain, allowing him to create Kallisti himself. The humans explain that their bunker has a hypertunnel, which can be used to quickly travel throughout space. Fitz tells The Doctor about Silver's mutants, and, with Miraso's help, breaks into Silver's office. Silver explains to Anji that he intends to use Dave's clone (Dave II) to give the human race some genetic variety. He explains that he plans to create a new race, Silverati, who all have the enhanced Kallisti, and are loyal to Silver. After conquering the empire, he plans to create time machines to spread his power further. The Doctor and Fitz are imprisoned after learning of Silver's plan. The Doctor gives Anji the TARDIS key and blows up the cell door with an explosive from his pocket. The Doctor turns Dave II into a Silverati disloyal to Silver. Dave II takes them to the hypertunnel and helps them fight Silver. Anji shoots Silver in the eye and he flees through the hypertunnel. The Doctor explains that he took the data on the TARDIS from him when they were fighting. Dave II reprograms the hypertunnel to leave Silver and his army stranded on a dead planet. The Doctor turns Dave II back into a human and Anji leaves him to create a new life for himself on Endpoint, before she leaves in the TARDIS.

== Continuity ==
- The Doctor's fight with Silver was one of the flashes of the future from Father Time.
- It is implied that The Brotherhood of The Silver Fist used abandoned Cybermen technology.
- The Doctor begins to suffer from the loss of his second heart in this novel, a plot line resolved in Camera Obscura.
- It is mentioned in one scene that Fitz sings in Chinese, a reference to Revolution Man.
