= Newtons Sleep =

2008 novel by Daniel O'Mahony

- First edition
- Author: Daniel O'Mahony
- Cover artist: Emma Weakley
- Language: English
- Series: Faction Paradox
- Genre: Science fiction novel
- Publisher: Random Static
- Publication date: 12 January 2008
- Publication place: New Zealand
- Media type: Print (Trade Paperback)
- Pages: 288
- ISBN: 978-0-473-12498-4
- OCLC: 191729047
- Preceded by: Erasing Sherlock
- Followed by: Against Nature

Newtons Sleep is an original novel by Daniel O'Mahony set in the Faction Paradox universe.

It is the only Faction Paradox novel to be published by Random Static. Although taking place in a shared universe, it is a stand-alone work that does not require any prior knowledge of Faction Paradox. The events of Newtons Sleep occur on Earth in the 17th century. One of the central characters of the book is the historical playwright and spy Aphra Behn.

The lack of an apostrophe in the title is intentional, and alludes to both Finnegans Wake and the original punctuation of the William Blake quote from which it is drawn:

"Now I a fourfold vision see And a fourfold vision is given to me Tis fourfold in my supreme delight And three fold in soft Beulahs night And twofold Always. May God us keep From Single vision & Newtons sleep."

— Blake, Letter to Thomas Butts, 22 November 1802. Quoted in Geoffrey Keynes (ed.), The Letters of William Blake(1956)

Blake is objecting to the literalism of the Newtonian mindset. He would have us see multiple significances in everything.

On 16 January 2009, Random Static released a free e-book edition of Newtons Sleep in pdf format.

== Awards ==
The cover art, by Emma Weakley won the Sir Julius Vogel Award (New Zealand science fiction and fantasy award) for Best Artwork in 2009.
