= This Town Will Never Let Us Go =

2003 novel by Lawrence Miles

- Author: Lawrence Miles
- Cover artist: Steve Johnson
- Language: English
- Series: Faction Paradox
- Genre: Science fiction
- Publisher: Mad Norwegian Press
- Publication date: 2003
- Publication place: United States
- Media type: Print (Trade Paperback and Hardback editions)
- Pages: 288 pp
- ISBN: 0-9725959-2-9 (pb) / ISBN 0-9725959-3-7 (hb)
- OCLC: 57341534
- Preceded by: The Book of the War
- Followed by: Of the City of the Saved...

This Town Will Never Let Us Go is an original novel by Lawrence Miles set in the Faction Paradox universe.

Although taking place in a shared universe, it is a stand-alone work that does not require any prior knowledge and features no recurring characters. Taking place over a single night in one-minute segments, the book is as much a commentary on modern culture as an imaginative science fiction story.

== Plot introduction ==
Inangela – a would-be recruit for Faction Paradox, the subcultural phenomenon that may or may not actually exist. Valentine – an ambulance driver with dangerous opinions about the War. Tiffany – a world-famous pop star whose public image is starting to get out of control. Over the next six hours, their paths will intersect, and they will uncover more than they bargained for.

There's something buried underneath this town – something that could alter the course of human history.
