= James F. McGrath =

Religious studies scholar

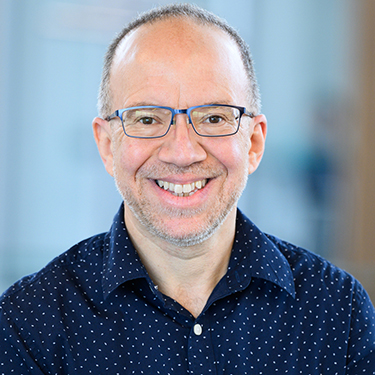
- Born: James Frank McGrath; 25 December 1972 (age 53)

Academic background
- Education: University of Cambridge; University of London; Durham University
- Doctoral advisor: James Dunn

Academic work
- Institutions: Butler University
- Main interests: Early Christianity; Mandaeism; criticism of the Christ myth theory; science fiction

James Frank McGrath is an American scholar of religion. He is the Clarence L. Goodwin Chair in New Testament Language and Literature at Butler University. He is known for his work on Early Christianity, Mandaeism, criticism of the Christ myth theory, and the analysis of religion in science fiction.

== Biography ==
James McGrath earned his diploma in religious studies with distinction from the University of Cambridge in 1993. He went on to receive his Bachelor of Divinity from the University of London, in which he was awarded Second Class, First Degree honors in 1995. He completed his Doctor of Philosophy at the University of Durham in 1998, under the supervision of James D. G. Dunn.

He has served as assistant professor of New Testament at Emmanuel University and the University of Oradea from 1998 to 2001, an adjunct professor at Biblical Theological Seminary and Alliance Theological Seminary from 2001 to 2002, and professor of religion at Butler University from 2002 to present. In 2010, he was appointed the Clarence L. Goodwin Chair of New Testament Language and Literature.

McGrath is also the creator of Canon: The Card Game.

== Academic publications ==
=== Books authored ===
- with Ankur Gupta. Real Intelligence: Teaching in the Era of Generative AI (PALNI Open Press, 2025)
- Beyond Deconstruction: Building a More Expansive Faith (Eerdmans, 2026)
- John of History, Baptist of Faith: The Quest for the Historical Baptizer (Eerdmans, 2024)
- Christmaker: A Life of John the Baptist (Eerdmans, 2024)
- The A to Z of the New Testament (Eerdmans, 2023)
- What Jesus Learned from Women (Cascade, 2021)
- The Black Archive #52: The Battle of Ranskoor Av Kolos (Obverse Books, 2021)
- The Mandaean Book of John: critical edition, translation, and commentary. (Berlin: De Gruyter, 2020; with Charles G. Häberl)
- Theology and Science Fiction (Cascade Companions; Eugene: Cascade, 2016)
- The Burial of Jesus: What Does History Have To Do With Faith? (Patheos Press, 2012)
- The Only True God: Monotheism in Early Judaism and Christianity (Urbana: University of Illinois Press, 2009)
- John’s Apologetic Christology: Legitimation and Development in Johannine Christology (SNTS Monograph Series, Cambridge University Press, 2001)

=== Books edited ===
- Time and Relative Dimensions in Faith: Religion and Doctor Who (co-edited with Andrew Crome; Darton, Longman, and Todd, 2013)
- Religion and Science Fiction (Pickwick Press, 2011; Lutterworth Press, 2012)

=== Articles and book chapters ===
- "A God Needs Compassion, but Not a Starship: Star Trek's Humanist Theology," in The Ultimate Star Trek and Philosophy: The Search for Socrates, ed. Kevin S. Decker and Jason T. Eberl. Malden: John Wiley & Sons, 2016, pp. 315–325.
- "Foreword" to The Son of God: Three Views of the Identity of Jesus, by Charles Lee Irons, Danny Andre Dixon, and Dustin R. Smith. Eugene: Wipf & Stock, 2015.
- "Explicit and Implicit Religion in Doctor Who and Star Trek," Implicit Religion 18:4 (2015) 471–484.
- "Polemic, Redaction, and History in the Mandaean Book of John: The Case of the Lightworld Visitors to Jerusalem," ARAM Periodical 25 (2013) 375–382.
- "Monotheism," in Vocabulary for the Study of Religion ed. Robert A. Segal and Kocku von Stuckrad (Leiden: E. J. Brill, 2015).
- "Mythicism and the Making of Mark" in The Bible and Interpretation August 2015
- "Religion’s Futures and the Future’s Religions through the Lens of Science Fiction" in The Changing World Religions Map, ed. Stan Brunn (New York: Springer, 2015) 2893–2905.
- "Monotheism," in The Oxford Encyclopedia of the Bible and Ethics, ed. Robert L. Brawley (Oxford University Press, 2014) 57–64.
- "Did Jesus Die in Outer Space? Evaluating a Key Claim in Richard Carrier’s On the Historicity of Jesus" in The Bible & Interpretation October 2014
- "John 2:13-16," "The Three Johns," and "The Woman at the Well" - contributions to the Society of Biblical Literature Bible Odyssey website.
- "Mythicism and the Mainstream: The Rhetoric and Realities of Academic Freedom" in The Bible and Interpretation March 2014.
- "Epilogue" in Time and Relative Dimensions in Faith (see above).
- "Revisiting the Mandaeans and the New Testament" in The Bible & Interpretation August 2013
- "Reading the Story of Miriai on Two Levels: Evidence from Mandaean Anti-Jewish Polemic about the Origins and Setting of Early Mandaeism," ARAM Periodical (2010): 583–592.

== Science fiction short stories ==
- "Biblical Literalism in the New Jerusalem," in Touching the Face of the Cosmos: On the Intersection of Space Travel and Religion edited by Paul Levinson and Michael Waltemathe, Fordham University Press, 2016, pp. 161–164.
