= The Adventuress of Henrietta Street =

2001 novel by Lawrence Miles

- Author: Lawrence Miles
- Cover artist: Black Sheep
- Series: Doctor Who book: Eighth Doctor Adventures
- Release number: 51
- Subject: Featuring: Eighth Doctor; Fitz and Anji
- Publisher: BBC Books
- Publication date: November 2001
- Pages: 284
- ISBN: 0-563-53842-2
- Preceded by: Grimm Reality
- Followed by: Mad Dogs and Englishmen

The Adventuress of Henrietta Street is a BBC Books original novel written by Lawrence Miles and based on the long-running British science fiction television series Doctor Who. It features the Eighth Doctor, Fitz and Anji.

== Plot ==
The destruction of Gallifrey has destabilised time. The Doctor arrives in Earth's history. He allies himself with Scarlette, who owns a brothel. They plan for the Doctor to marry Juliette, who works in the brothel.

== Writing and development ==
The novel is written in the style of a history text, drawing on the genre of historical biographies and has been compared to Thomas Pynchon's Mason & Dixon.

This novel sees the first named appearance of the villain Sabbath, who subsequently appeared in many of the following novels.Michael, Matt (July 2003). "Further Adventures Books". Doctor Who Magazine. p. 77 – via Internet Archive. Sabbath is presented as an antagonist and a narrative double to the character of the Doctor. The book also features Miles' creation of the Faction Paradox. The character of the Doctor is presented as a fallen demigod.
