= Dale Smith (writer) =

British writer (born 1976)

Paul Dale Smith
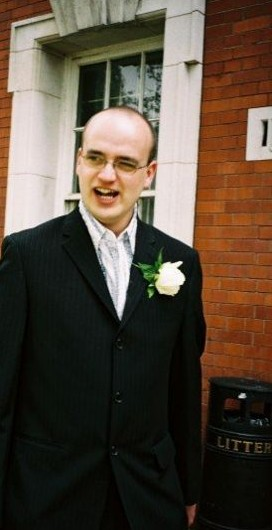
- Paul Dale Smith, Stockport 2007
- Born: Paul Dale Smith; November 1976 (age 49); Leicester, England
- Occupations: writer and playwright
- Writing career
- Pen name: Dale Smith
- Genres: Doctor Who, science fiction, social realism
- Website: www.dalesmithonline.com

Paul Dale Smith (born November 1976) is a writer and playwright from Leicester, England but currently living and working in Greater Manchester. He writes under the name Dale Smith, and has had previous works published and performed under the names Paul Smith and Paul D. Smith.

He is most well known for work on various Doctor Who spin-offs.

== Biography ==
Smith was born in Leicester in 1976, and has been writing since the age of 8. In his youth, he worked as a youth worker at his school, receiving training on various aspects of the job including child abuse awareness. Early in his career, he wrote stage plays but has recently turned to writing prose as "it's still almost impossible to get anything actually produced".

He has stated that his ambition is to "be Ian Rankin, lock stock and house in Edinburgh. But I'll settle for just being able to keep writing and keep getting stuff seen by people". In his spare time he draws and creates digital pictures, and also plays the guitar.

== Career ==
Smith's first published work was a poem published in the Leicester Mercury about Native Americans. He was still a pupil at junior school at the time. By the time he had moved to secondary school, he had had several fan fiction short stories published in Cosmic Masque, the fiction magazine of the Doctor Who Appreciation Society and this encouraged him to submit two short stories to Marvel UK's Doctor Who Magazine. These were published in the Brief Encounters section, some of the last stories published before the feature was discontinued.

Whilst writing short stories, Smith was also studying at Soar Valley Community College, Leicester, where he developed a keen interest in the theatre. He joined Jez Simons' Haithi Productions youth theatre group where he appeared in Simons' and Joyti Patel's The Fire Dragon at the Phoenix Arts Centre alongside future ER cast member Parminder Nagra. He entered the Independent Radio Drama Productions (IRDP) Young Radio Playwright Competition 1994 with the play Hello?, after re-writing the ending at Simons' suggestion. He won the competition, and the radio play was broadcast on LBC and performed at the Cambridge Theatre, before transferring to the Old Red Lion Theatre for a four-week run.

Following the success of Hello? (with reviews calling the play "35 minutes of tense drama" and "frighteningly direct . . . it will haunt you for a long time afterwards.") IRDP produced another of Smith's plays. The Kissing Game enjoyed a four-week run at the Tristan Bates Actors Centre, and following a relocation to Manchester to read drama at Manchester University, Smith continued to have work produced: he was runner up in the 1997 Manchester Student Playwriting Competition before winning outright in 1998 with the play A Night on the Tiles. This was followed by a play set in and around Northampton during the Battle of Naseby.

Whilst the BBC considered Heritage for their Past Doctor Adventures range, Smith continued to write short Doctor Who stories, and during 2001 he had stories published in three major charity anthologies: Missing Pieces, The Cat Who Walked Through Time and Walking in Eternity. Smith has acknowledged the role these stories played in his successful commission, saying, "It can't be coincidence that the month that I was contacted about my proposal was also the month it was announced I had stories in the three biggest charity anthologies of the year, can it?"

After graduating from university, Smith worked part-time at Manchester University's John Rylands University Library, where he met his future wife. He returned to writing Doctor Who with the novella The Albino's Dancer, published as part of the Telos Time Hunter range, which was followed in turn by short stories for Big Finish Productions' Short Trips and Bernice Summerfield ranges.

Smith wrote a paper in the academic textbook Time and Relative Dissertations in Space edited by David Butler and the novel The Many Hands for the BBC's New Series Adventures range.

Most recently he contributed a short story to the Obverse Books' collection, Wildthyme in Purple and edited the collection The Perennial Miss Wildthyme, for which he also contributed a short story.

== List of works ==
=== Plays ===
- Hello? (1994), IRDP — radio play broadcast on LBC
- Hello? (1994), IRDP — stage play performed at the Old Red Lion Theatre
- The Kissing Game (1996), IRDP — stage play performed at the Tristan Bates Theatre
- A Night on the Tiles (1998), K486 — stage play performed at C venues
- Skin Deep (1998), Royal Exchange Theatre, Manchester — section of full work performed in the Royal Exchange Studio
- The Lunatic (1999), Channel 12 — stage play performed at C Venues
- A Northamptonshire Tale (2000), Royal Theatre Northampton — stage play performed around Northampton

=== Prose ===
- Heritage (2003), ISBN 0-563-53864-3, BBC Books
- The Albino's Dancer (2006), ISBN 1-84583-100-4, Telos Publishing Ltd.
- The Many Hands (2008), ISBN 1-84607-422-3, BBC Books
- Spinning Jenny (2017), ISBN 978-1909031487, Obverse Books

=== Short stories ===
Brief Encounters

- Front Line (1993), Doctor Who Magazine. Editor — Gary Russell
- The Gallery (1994), Doctor Who Magazine. Editor — Gary Russell

Big Finish Productions

- Pluto in Short Trips: The Solar System (2005), ISBN 1-84435-148-3, Big Finish Productions. Editor — Gary Russell
- Mother's Ruin in Collected Works (2006), ISBN 1-84435-241-2, Big Finish Productions. Editor — Nick Wallace
- Driftwood in Short Trips: Transmissions (2008), Big Finish Productions. Editor — Richard Salter

Obverse Books

- The Fag Hag from Hell in The Panda Book of Horror (2009), Obverse Books. Editors — Paul Magrs and Stuart Douglas
- The Bronze Door in Wildthyme in Purple (2011), Obverse Books. Editors — Stuart Douglas and Cody Quijano-Schell
- About a Girl in Tales of the City (2012), Obverse Books. Editor — Philip Purser-Hallard
