= Hamfatter =

British rock band

- Origin: Cambridge, England
- Genres: rock music
- Years active: 2003–present
- Labels: Pink Hedgehog, Hamfatter Ltd.
- Members: Eoin O'Mahony (vocals, piano, bass guitar); James 'Jimbo' Ingham (guitar, backing vocals); Mark Ellis (drums).
- Past members: Emilie Martin (Co-vocalist)

Hamfatter is an English rock band formed in Cambridge in 2002.The band are known primarily for their appearance on BBC's Dragons' Den. The core of the band is a three-piece, comprising Eoin O'Mahony (vocals, bass guitar, piano), James Ingham (guitar, backing vocals) and Mark Ellis (drums).

O'Mahony is the younger brother of the author Daniel O'Mahony.

== Dragons' Den ==
The band appeared on the UK edition of Dragons' Den on BBC2 on 21 July 2008, where they performed an extract from "Sziget (We Get Wrecked)" in an attempt to secure a £75,000 investment as an alternative to a standard record deal. After offers from four of the five potential investors, they agreed a deal with Peter Jones.

The day after airing, Jones appeared on The Chris Moyles Show on BBC Radio 1 and Hamfatter's next single "The Girl I Love" was previewed. It was then announced that the song was available to download immediately, and would be available to buy physically in August. Within one hour of their appearance on Dragons' Den, the single had sold 500 copies via downloads, with a further 1,000 selling later that night. On the UK Singles Chart published on 27 July 2008, the song entered at Number 71. Released on CD and vinyl a month later, the single entered the UK indie singles chart at Number 3.

== Criticism ==
Hamfatter's unorthodox method of raising funding from outside the record label system led to some negative comments from New Musical Express and The Guardian. The NME subsequently published a negative review by Nick Haynes of the re-released album What Part of Hamfatter Do You Not Understand? without indicating that the album had previously received a favourable review from another NME journalist; the latter review did, however, contain praise for "The Girl I Love", the only new track recorded after the band had secured financial backing from Jones. Elsewhere, the Dragons' Den deal was greeted with interest and cautious praise from industry figures such as Dave Eringa, Feargal Sharkey and NME news editor Paul Stokes. Reports that Hamfatter were due to sign a record contract with Simon Cowell or Sony were dismissed by the band as journalistic invention.

== Discography ==
=== Albums ===
- Fireworks (2004)
- Girls in Graz (2006)
- What Part of Hamfatter Do You Not Understand? (2007)
- Cassiopeia (2011)

=== Singles ===
- "Sziget (We Get Wrecked)" (2007; UK Number 54)
- "The Girl I Love" (2008; UK Number 71)

=== EPs ===
- History EP (2019)
