= Christmas on a Rational Planet =

1996 novel by Lawrence Miles

- Author: Lawrence Miles
- Cover artist: Mike Posen
- Series: Doctor Who book: Virgin New Adventures
- Release number: 52
- Subject: Featuring: Seventh Doctor; Chris, Roz
- Publisher: Virgin Books
- Publication date: July 1996
- ISBN: 0-426-20476-X
- Preceded by: GodEngine
- Followed by: Return of the Living Dad

Christmas on a Rational Planet is an original novel written by Lawrence Miles and based on the long-running British science fiction television series Doctor Who. It features the Seventh Doctor, Chris and Roz.

It also contains the first casual reference to the Faction Paradox, which become an important element in the BBC books Eighth Doctor Adventures and subsequent spin-off series, and an explicit explanation that the mark carried by the Third Doctor during his exile on Earth was a branding used to distinguish criminals by the Time Lords (in reality, this mark was a tattoo of a cobra that Jon Pertwee picked up while serving in the Royal Navy).
