= Obverse Books =

British publisher

- Founded: 2008
- Founder: Stuart Douglas
- Country of origin: United Kingdom
- Headquarters location: Edinburgh, Scotland
- Distribution: United Kingdom, Australia, United States
- Publication types: Books
- Fiction genres: Science fiction, fantasy, horror, adventure
- Official website: www.obversebooks.com

Obverse Books is a British publisher initially known for publishing books relating to the character Iris Wildthyme, and currently for the Black Archive series of critical books on Doctor Who, and two sister series - the Gold Archive, focusing on Star Trek, and the Silver Archive, featuring other genre shows. The company also owns publishing rights for stories based on Faction Paradox, and previously held the license to Sexton Blake. Obverse Books had an e-book only imprint named Manleigh Books between 2012 and 2016.

== History ==
The company was founded in 2008 in Edinburgh by Stuart Douglas. Obverse's first book was a 2009 collection of short stories featuring the character Iris Wildthyme, first seen in the Doctor Who universe. Further volumes of Iris Wildthyme short stories have followed regularly.

In 2010 the company expanded their line to include story collections from single authors and collections that did not focus primarily on science fiction. That same year the company also acquired the rights to publish short story collections based on Faction Paradox.

In 2011 Obverse launched The Obverse Quarterly, a series of paperback books aimed at genre fans. The series contains stories by authors such as George Mann, Paul Magrs and Michael Moorcock, and new stories featuring Zenith the Albino, Sherlock Holmes and The City of the Saved, amongst others. That same year Obverse began publishing a series of tete-beche collections as part of the resurgence of such books in the speculative fiction market. The following year Obverse launched an ebook-only imprint, Manleigh Books.

Obverse obtained the rights to the character of Sexton Blake in 2013 and relaunched the Sexton Blake Library in 2014 with Mark Hodder's 'The Silent Thunder Caper'.

In 2015 Obverse announced The Black Archive, a series of book-length critical studies of individual Doctor Who stories, launched in March 2016. In 2017, a sister series The Silver Archive was announced. This Archive, edited by Stuart Douglas, covers series other than Doctor Who, including Sapphire & Steel, Dark Skies, Stranger Things and The Strange World of Gurney Slade.

In 2018, a charity book published by Obverse contained a section of the abandoned Steven Moffat script for The Day of the Doctor featuring the Ninth Doctor as played by Christopher Eccleston.

In 2019, to celebrate the 10th anniversary of the imprint, Obverse published six books, each featuring one of the most popular characters from their catalogue. These included Iris Wildthyme, Faction Paradox, The Manleigh Halt Irregulars, Senor 105, Seaton Begg and The City of the Saved.

The Black Archive #15: Full Circle by John Toon won New Zealand science fiction's Sir Julius Vogel Award for Best Professional Publication in 2019. Toon repeated the feat in 2022, when they won the same award for The Black Archive #61: Paradise Towers.

In 2021, Obverse announced a new Gold Archive range, focusing on individual episodes of Star Trek. The company also licensed the prose rights to the setting and characters from the Doctor Who story Paradise Towers.

In 2023, the photobook Dark Edinburgh by Scott Liddell won a Scottish Nature Photography Award as 'Favourite Scottish Nature Photography Book' for 2022.

== Fiction ==
=== Iris Wildthyme ===
- Iris Wildthyme and the Celestial Omnibus (eds Paul Magrs and Stuart Douglas, 29 May 2009)
- The Panda Book of Horror (eds Stuart Douglas and Paul Magrs, 12 December 2009)
- Miss Wildthyme and Friends Investigate (collection of linked novellas, 10 June 2010)
- Iris: Abroad (eds Stuart Douglas and Paul Magrs, December 2010)
- Wildthyme in Purple (ed Stuart Douglas and Cody Quijano-Schell)
- Lady Stardust (ed Art Critic Panda, 2012)
- Fifteen (ed Stuart Douglas, August 2013)
- Iris Wildthyme of Mars (ed Philip Purser-Hallard, October 2014)
- The Perennial Miss Wildthyme (ed Dale Smith, October 2015)
- A Clockwork Iris (ed Stuart Douglas, George Mann, and Paul Magrs, February 2017)
- Wild Thymes on the 22 (ed Stewart Sheargold, 2018)
- Locked in Space (ed Stewart Sheargold, 2025)
- Bafflement & Devotion: Iris at the Edges (collection of previously published Iris stories from charity anthologies)

=== The New Adventures of Iris Wildthyme ===
- Iris Wildthyme and the Polythene Terror by Paul Magrs
- Mother, Maiden, Crone by Courtney Milnestein
- Nobody's Sweetheart Now by Dale Smith

=== Faction Paradox ===
- A Romance in Twelve Parts (ed Stuart Douglas, 2011)
- Burning with Optimism's Flames (ed Julian Eales, 2012)
- Against Nature - Lawrence Burton (2013)
- The Brakespeare Voyage - Simon Bucher-Jones and Jonathan Dennis (2013)
- Liberating Earth (ed Kate Orman, 2015)
- Head of State - Andrew Hickey (2015)
- Weapons Grade Snake Oil - Blair Bidmead (2017)
- Spinning Jenny - Dale Smith (2017)
- The Book of the Enemy (ed Simon Bucher-Jones, 2018)
- The Book of the Peace (ed Philip Marsh, 2018)

=== Worlds of the Spiral Politic ===
- The Boulevard: Volume One (ed Stuart Douglas, 2022)
- Inward Collapse by Lawrence Burton (2023)
- The Boulevard: Volume Two (ed Simon Bucher-Jones, 2024)
- Rose-Coloured Crosshairs by Blair Bidmead (2025)

=== Paradise Towers ===
- Build High for Happiness (ed Stuart Douglas, 2022)
- Ice Hot (ed Kara Dennison, 2024)
- As A Kang Should Be by Dale Smith (2025)

=== Charity anthologies ===
- Storyteller - a Found Book (charity anthology for cystic fibrosis)
- Dalekese (Dalek language guide, edited by Finn Clark)
- A Target for Tommy (limited edition anthology of fundraising Doctor Who short stories)
- A Second Target for Tommy (limited edition anthology of fundraising Doctor Who short stories)
- The Cushingverse Collection (limited edition set of books of charity Peter Cushing Doctor Who short stories and novels)
- Forgotten Lives volumes 1 to 3 (limited edition anthologies of charity Doctor Who short stories featuring the Morbius Doctors)
- A Target for Antoni (limited edition anthology of fundraising Doctor Who short stories)
- Party Like It's 1998 (limited edition anthology of fundraising Doctor Who short stories)
- Fabulous (limited edition anthology of fundraising genre television short stories)

=== The Sexton Blake Library ===
- Sexton Blake and the Silent Thunder Caper by Mark Hodder (2014)

=== The City of the Saved ===
- Tales of the City (ed Philip Purser-Hallard, 2012)
- More Tales of the City (ed Philip Purser-Hallard, 2013)
- Tales of the Great Detectives (ed Philip Purser-Hallard, 2014)
- Furthest Tales of the City (ed Philip Purser-Hallard, 2015)
- Tales of the Civil War (ed Philip Purser-Hallard, 2017)
- Stranger Tales of the City (ed Elizabeth Evershed, 2018)
- Of the City of the Saved (Philip Purser-Hallard, reprint 2025)

=== The Periodic Adventures of Señor 105 ===
- The Gulf, or Señor 105 y el Cráter Misterioso by Cody Quijano-Schell (2012)
- The Grail, or Señor 105 y el Pueblo del Gobernador Demente by Lawrence Burton (2012)
- By the Time I Get to Venus, or Recuerda by Blair Bidmead (2012)
- Señor 105 and the Secret Santa, or El Santa, el Barbudo de Plata by Stuart Douglas (2012)
- Green Eyed and Grim, or Aquí Hay Dragones by Selina Lock (2013)
- Horizon, or Señor 105 contra las Momias Locas de Odinhotep by Philip Purser-Hallard (2013)
- The Senor 105 Adventure Book, or Señor 105 y los Chicos y las Chicas Guía de Peligro by Joe Curreri (2013)
- The Five Faces of Fear, or Ocho de Lado by Jay Eales (2013)
- Spectrum, or Monstruos en la Luz by Stewart Sheargold (2014)
- The Collected Señor 105 Volume 1 (2025)
- The Collected Señor 105 Volume 2 (2025)
- The Collected Señor 105 Volume 3 (2025)

=== The Obverse Quarterly ===
- Book 1.1: Bite Sized Horror (ed Johnny Mains)
- Book 1.2: Señor 105 and the Elements of Danger (ed Cody Quijano-Schell)
- Book 1.3: The Diamond Lens and Other Stories (the short fiction of Fitz James O'Brien)
- Book 1.4: Zenith Lives!: Tales of M.Zenith, the Albino
- Book 2.1: Tales of the City (ed Philip Purser-Hallard)
- Book 2.2: Lady Stardust (Iris Wildthyme and David Bowie)
- Book 2.3: The Casebook of the Manleigh Halt Irregulars (ed Philip Craggs)
- Book 2.4: The Obverse Book of Detectives (ed Stuart Douglas)

=== An Obverse Sextet ===
Six novellas featuring popular characters, released to celebrate Obverse Books' Tenth Anniversary in November 2019

- The Mystic Menagerie of Iris Wildthyme - Nick Campbell
- The Rise and Fall of Señor 105 - Blair Bidmead
- The Immortal Seaton Begg - Simon Bucher-Jones
- Hyponormalisation: A Faction Hollywood Production - Jonathan Dennis
- Closing the Casebook - Nick Wallace
- Vanishing Tales of the City - Kara Dennison

=== Obverse Originals ===
- Welcome Home, Bernard Socks by Paul Magrs (2015)
- Terra Exitus by Scott M. Liddell (2016)
- The Wallscrawler and Other Stories by Stephen Wyatt
- Science Fiction by Scott M. Liddell (2023)
- Beyond the Veil by Paul Magrs (2023)

=== Other titles ===
- The Obverse Book of Ghosts (ed, Cavan Scott, November 2010)
- With Deepest Sympathy - Johnny Mains (October 2010)
- Team Up - Paul Magrs and George Mann
- Behind the Sofa - Mark Charlesworth and Chris Newton
- The Ninnies - Paul Magrs (April 2012)
- The Newbury and Hobbes Annual 2013 - George Mann (December 2012)
- The Blue Landscape and other stories - Stewart Sheargold-Pearce (2012, ebook only)
- A Treasury of Brenda and Effie (ed, Paul Magrs, 2017)
- Stardust & Snow (A6 Christmas story of David Bowie)
- Dark Edinburgh by Scott M. Liddell (hardback photobook of images of Edinburgh)

== Non-fiction ==
=== The Black Archive ===
- The Black Archive #1: Rose by Jon Arnold (March 2016)
- The Black Archive #2: The Massacre by James Cooray Smith (March 2016)
- The Black Archive #3: The Ambassadors of Death by L M Myles (March 2016)
- The Black Archive #4: Dark Water / Death in Heaven by Philip Purser-Hallard (March 2016)
- The Black Archive #5: Image of the Fendahl by Simon Bucher-Jones (May 2016)
- The Black Archive #6: Ghost Light by Jonathan Dennis (July 2016)
- The Black Archive #7: The Mind Robber by Andrew Hickey (September 2016)
- The Black Archive #8: Black Orchid by Ian Millsted (November 2016)
- The Black Archive #9: The God Complex by Paul Driscoll (January 2017)
- The Black Archive #10: Scream of the Shalka by Jon Arnold (March 2017)
- The Black Archive #11: The Evil of the Daleks by Simon Guerrier (May 2017)
- The Black Archive #12: Pyramids of Mars by Kate Orman (July 2017)
- The Black Archive #13: Human Nature / The Family of Blood by Naomi Jacobs and Philip Purser-Hallard (September 2017)
- The Black Archive #14: The Ultimate Foe by James Cooray Smith (November 2017)
- The Black Archive #15: Full Circle by John Toon (January 2018)
- The Black Archive #16: Carnival of Monsters by Ian Potter (February 2018)
- The Black Archive #17: The Impossible Planet / The Satan Pit by Simon Bucher-Jones (March 2018)
- The Black Archive #18: Marco Polo by Dene October (April 2018)
- The Black Archive #19: The Eleventh Hour by Jon Arnold (May 2018)
- The Black Archive #20: Face the Raven by Sarah Groenewegen (June 2018)
- The Black Archive #21: Heaven Sent by Kara Dennison (July 2018)
- The Black Archive #22: Hell Bent by Alyssa Franke (August 2018)
- The Black Archive #23: The Curse of Fenric by Una McCormack (September 2018)
- The Black Archive #24: The Time Warrior by Matthew Kilburn (October 2018)
- The Black Archive #25: Doctor Who (1996) by Paul Driscoll (November 2018)
- The Black Archive #26: The Dæmons by Matt Barber (December 2018)
- The Black Archive #27: The Face of Evil by Thomas L Rodebaugh (January 2019)
- The Black Archive #28: Love & Monsters by Niki Haringsma (February 2019)
- The Black Archive #29: The Impossible Astronaut / Day of the Moon by John Toon (March 2019)
- The Black Archive #30: The Dalek Invasion of Earth by Jonathan Morris (April 2019)
- The Black Archive #31: Warriors' Gate by Frank Collins (May 2019)
- The Black Archive #32: The Romans by Jacob Edwards (June 2019)
- The Black Archive #33: Horror of Fang Rock by Matthew Guerrieri (July 2019)
- The Black Archive #34: Battlefield by Philip Purser-Hallard (August 2019)
- The Black Archive #35: Timelash by Phil Pascoe (September 2019)
- The Black Archive #36: Listen by Dewi Small (October 2019)
- The Black Archive #37: Kerblam! by Naomi Jacobs and Thomas L Rodebaugh (November 2019)
- The Black Archive #38: The Sound of Drums / Last of the Time Lords by James Mortimer (December 2019)
- The Black Archive #39: The Silurians by Stacey Smith? (January 2020)
- The Black Archive #40: The Underwater Menace by James Cooray Smith (April 2020)
- The Black Archive #41: Vengeance on Varos by Jonathan Dennis (April 2020)
- The Black Archive #42: The Rings of Akhaten by William Shaw (April 2020)
- The Black Archive #43: The Robots of Death by Fiona Moore (May 2020)
- The Black Archive #44: The Pandorica Opens / The Big Bang by Philip Bates (June 2020)
- The Black Archive #45: The Deadly Assassin by Andrew Orton (July 2020)
- The Black Archive #46: The Awakening by David Evans-Powell (August 2020)
- The Black Archive #47: The Stones of Blood by Katrin Thier (September 2020)
- The Black Archive #48: Arachnids in the UK by Sam Maleski (October 2020)
- The Black Archive #49: The Night of the Doctor by James Cooray Smith (November 2020)
- The Black Archive #50: The Day of the Doctor by Alasdair Stuart (December 2020)
- The Black Archive #51: Earthshock by Brian J Robb (February 2021)
- The Black Archive #52: The Battle of Ranskoor Av Kolos by James F. McGrath (April 2021)
- The Black Archive #53: The Hand of Fear by Simon Bucher-Jones (June 2021)
- The Black Archive #54: Dalek by Billy Seguire (August 2021)
- The Black Archive #55: Invasion of the Dinosaurs by Jon Arnold (October 2021)
- The Black Archive #56: The Haunting of Villa Diodati by Philip Purser-Hallard (December 2021)
- The Black Archive #57: Vincent and the Doctor by Paul Driscoll (February 2022)
- The Black Archive #58: The Talons of Weng-Chiang by Dale Smith (April 2022)
- The Black Archive #59: Kill the Moon by Darren Mooney (June 2022)
- The Black Archive #60: The Sun Makers by Lewis Baston (August 2022)
- The Black Archive #61: Paradise Towers by John Toon (October 2022)
- The Black Archive #62: Kinda by Frank Collins (December 2022)
- The Black Archive #63: Flux edited by Paul Driscoll (February 2023)
- The Black Archive #64: The Girl Who Died by Tom Marshall (April 2023)
- The Black Archive #65: The Myth Makers by Ian Potter (June 2023)
- The Black Archive #66: The Greatest Show in the Galaxy by Dale Smith (August 2023)
- The Black Archive #67: The Edge of Destruction by Simon Guerrier (October 2023)
- The Black Archive #68: The Happiness Patrol by Mike Stack (December 2023)
- The Black Archive #69: Midnight by Philip Purser-Hallard (February 2024)
- The Black Archive #70: Ascension of the Cybermen / The Timeless Children by Ryan Bradley (April 2024)
- The Black Archive #71: The Aztecs by Doris V Sutherland (June 2024)
- The Black Archive #72: Silence in the Library / The Forest of the Dead by Dale Smith (August 2024)
- The Black Archive #73: Under the Lake / Before the Flood by Kevin Decker & Ryan Parrey (October 2024)
- The Black Archive #74: A Christmas Carol by Jamie Beckwith & Leslie Grace McMurtry (December 2024)
- The Black Archive #73: Under the Lake / Before the Flood by Ryan C Parrey and Kevin S Decker (October 2024)
- The Black Archive #74: A Christmas Carol by Jamie Beckwith and Leslie Grace McMurtry (December 2024)
- The Black Archive #75: Silver Nemesis by James Cooray Smith (February 2025)
- The Black Archive #76: Logopolis by Jonathan Hay (April 2025)
- The Black Archive #77: Castrovalva by Andrew Orton (June 2025)
- The Black Archive #78: The Devil's Chord by Dale Smith (August 2025)
- The Black Archive #79: The Mysterious Planet by Jez Strickley (October 2025)
- The Black Archive #80: Mawdryn Undead by Kara Dennison (December 2025)
- The Black Archive #81: The Ark by Philip Purser-Hallard (February 2026)
- The Black Archive #82: The Daleks by Oliver Wake (April 2026)
- The Black Archive #83: The Web Planet by Brigid Cherry (June 2026)
- The Black Archive #84: The Invasion by Stephen Hatcher (August 2026)
- The Black Archive #85: Frontios by Paul Driscoll (October 2026)

=== The Gold Archive ===
- The Gold Archive #1: The Return of the Archons by Brian J Robb (February 2022)
- The Gold Archive #2: Through the Valley of Shadows by Alasdair Stuart (February 2022)
- The Gold Archive #3: Spock's Brain by Nick Joy (February 2022)

=== The Silver Archive ===
- The Silver Archive Christmas Special: The Christmas Box by Paul Magrs (December 2017)
- The Silver Archive #1: Sapphire and Steel (Assignments 1 & 2) by David McIntee and Lesley McIntee (August 2018)
- The Silver Archive #2: Sapphire and Steel (Assignments 3 & 4) by Cody Schell (August 2018)
- The Silver Archive #3: Sapphire and Steel (Assignments 5 & 6) by James Cooray Smith (August 2018)
- The Silver Archive #4: Stranger Things Season 1 by Paul Driscoll (January 2019)
- The Silver Archive #5: Dark Skies by Matthew Kresal (April 2020)
- The Silver Archive #6: The Strange World of Gurney Slade by Andrew Hickey (October 2020)
- The Silver Archive #7: Survivors: Mad Dog by Rich Cross (February 2022)
- The Silver Archive #8: Millennium by Stacey Smith? (September 2022)

=== Time's Mosaic ===
- Time's Mosaic 9 - Eccleston, Torchwood and Quatermass by Finn Clark (2015)
- Time's Mosaic 5 - Davison, Sarah-Jane and Erimem by Finn Clark (2017)
- Time's Mosaic 6 - Colin Baker, BBV and K9 by Finn Clark (2019)
- Time’s Mosaic 3 - Pertwee, BBV and Reeltime by Finn Clark (2022)
- Time’s Mosaic 10A - Tennant, Rose and Martha by Finn Clark (2023)
- Time’s Mosaic 10B - Tennant, Donna and the Daleks by Finn Clark (2026)

=== Other titles ===
- Face to Face: Interviews in Time and Space (ed Eddie McGuigan, November 2013)
- The 500 Year Diary Volume 1 (1963-1973) (Paul Castle, November 2013)
- Downtime - The Lost Worlds of Doctor Who - Dylan Rees (2017)
- The Annual Years (Paul Magrs, June 2014, second edition 2019)
- An Electric Storm: Daphne, Delia and the BBC Radiophonic Workshop (Ned Netherwood, October 2015, second edition 2019)
- Radiophonic Times (Peter Howell, March 2021)
- An Archive Special: An Adventure in Space and Time by David Rolinson (April 2026)
