= Of the City of the Saved... =

Book by Philip Purser-Hallard

- Author: Philip Purser-Hallard
- Cover artist: Steve Johnson
- Language: English
- Series: Faction Paradox
- Genre: Science fiction
- Publisher: Mad Norwegian Press
- Publication date: 2004
- Publication place: United States
- Media type: Print (Trade Paperback)
- Pages: 256 pp
- ISBN: 0-9725959-4-5
- OCLC: 56589181
- Preceded by: This Town Will Never Let Us Go
- Followed by: Warlords of Utopia

Of the City of the Saved... is an original novel by Philip Purser-Hallard set in the Faction Paradox universe. Laura Tobin, who first appeared in the BBC Doctor Who books, is a major character in the novel.

The full title, as given on the title page, is Of the City of the Saved... of its diverse citizenry and of its sundry divinities, with a disquisition on the protocols of history. The novel won Best Book in the 2004 Jade Pagoda awards, voted on by members of a Doctor Who book mailing list. It has been described as "a stunning debut from Purser-Hallard and easily one of the best Doctor Who-related original novels published to date". The Encyclopedia of Science Fiction calls it "ambitious".

== Plot introduction ==
Beyond the end of the universe exists The City of the Saved, an urban sprawl the size of a galaxy. Within it every human being that ever lived, from the first australopithecine to the last posthuman, has been inexplicably resurrected. For three hundred years, the uncountable inhabitants have enjoyed their unaging and invulnerable second lives. But now, the unthinkable has happened. Someone has been murdered.

== Continuity ==
The City of the Saved was introduced in The Book of the War and is the setting of Purser-Hallard's story in the Obverse Books anthology A Romance in Twelve Parts. A series of anthologies set in the City and edited by Purser-Hallard has been published by Obverse Books since 2012.

== Cultural references ==
Among others, the science fiction author Philip K. Dick and the Roman Emperor Claudius appear as characters in the novel. Various fictional characters appear as artificial constructs within the City, including Sherlock Holmes and Don Juan DeMarco.

== Reprint ==
In 2025, Obverse Books reprinted the novel, with additional short stories by the author and new illustrations.
