= Mark Clapham =

British author

Mark Clapham (born 1976) is a British author, best known for writing fiction and reference books for television series, in particular relating to Doctor Who (and its spin-offs) and Warhammer 40,000.

== Writing ==
Clapham started out writing Doctor Who fan fiction and, through Seventh Door Fanzines, began to work with Lance Parkin. Notable fan fiction work included Integration, a novella in Seventh Door's Odyssey series, edited by Parkin.

Having been asked to write a New Adventure (a Bernice Summerfield novel for Virgin Publishing) for the November 1998 slot, Parkin found himself too busy with other commitments to write a book on his own and, with editor Rebecca Levene's blessing, brought in Clapham as a co-author. Between them, the two devised Beige Planet Mars, a campus mystery novel set at a Mars University. Clapham was later offered the final Virgin Benny slot and, with a tight deadline, brought in Jon de Burgh Miller as his co-writer on Twilight of the Gods.

Clapham went on to co-write The Taking of Planet 5 with Simon Bucher-Jones in the BBC's Doctor Who novel line, before eventually writing his first solo novel for the line, Hope. He wrote a comic in Accent UK's Zombies anthology. He edited Secret Histories, a Bernice Summerfield anthology.

He has written non-fiction, both reference books for TV (often with Jim Smith) and magazine work, notably for the official Xena: Warrior Princess magazine. With Smith and Eddie Robson, he wrote Who's Next: An Unofficial Guide to Doctor Who.

He later wrote official fiction in the Warhammer 40,000 universe.

== Bibliography ==
=== Bernice Summerfield ===
==== Virgin ====
- Beige Planet Mars, with Lance Parkin
- Twilight of the Gods, with Jon de Burgh Miller

==== Big Finish ====
- Secret Histories, editor and linking material
- "In the Ledgers of Madness", short story in Present Danger
- "The Seventh Fanfic", short story in In Time
- Venus Mantrap, with Lance Parkin; audio drama, 2009
- "Tap", short audio drama, in The Christmas Collection

=== Doctor Who ===
- The Taking of Planet 5, with Simon Bucher-Jones, 1999
- Hope, 2002
- "A Town Called Eternity", with Lance Parkin; short story in Short Trips and Side Steps

=== Iris Wildthyme ===
- "Channel 666", short story in The Panda Book of Horror
- "Lilac Mars", with Lance Parkin; short story in Iris Wildthyme of Mars

=== Warhammer 40K ===
- "Sanctified", short story in Fear the Alien
- "In Hrondir's Tomb, short story in Hammer and Bolter issue 20; re-published online, ISBN 9781785723001
- Iron Guard, novel, July 2012 as ebook, ISBN 9780857877543; 2013 as paperback, ISBN 9781849704991
  - Le Garde de Fer (French edition), 2015
- "The Siege of Fellguard", short story published online in December 2013
- "The Hour of Hell", short story published online in December 2013 (sequel to "The Siege of Fellguard")
- "Blood of Sanguinius", short story published online in December 2014, ISBN 978-1-78251-830-3
- "Hollow Beginnings", short story published online in August 2015, ISBN 9781785721786
- "Deathwatch: The Known Unknown", short story published online in February 2016
- Tyrant of the Hollow Worlds, novel, December 2016
  - Le Tyran des Mondes Creux (French edition), 2017
  - Der Tyrann der Hohlwelten (German edition), 2017

=== Other fiction ===
- Dead Stop, novella, Abaddon Books, 2014
- Black Plasma Adventures, with David Zoellner, graphic novel, 2020

=== Non-fiction ===
- Soul Searching: The Unofficial Guide to the Life and Trials of Ally McBeal, with Jim Smith, 2000
  - Ally McBeal. Le Guide Non Officiel de la Série (French edition), 2001
- Small Town, Strange World: An Unofficial and Unauthorised Guide to Smallville, 2003
- Secret Identities - An Unofficial and Unauthorised Guide to Alias, with Lance Parkin, 2003
- Who's Next: An Unofficial and Unauthorised Guide to Doctor Who: An Unofficial & Unauthorised Guide to Dr Who, with Eddie Robson and Jim Smith, 2005
