= Ian Potter (writer) =

UK-based writer and broadcaster

Ian Potter (born 20th century) is a UK-based writer and broadcaster, known for a series of short stories in the Big Finish Short Trips collection, Doctor Who fiction range.

He has also written for the BBC Radio 4 series Front Row, The Way It Is and Week Ending.

== Work ==
Until September 2006, Potter was a television curator at the National Museum of Photography, Film and Television.

In television production he worked on Ads Infinitum for BBC Two, Trust Me I'm A Celebrity for BBC One, and Up Late for BBC Choice

As a sound designer for the company Big Finish Productions, Potter worked on the Doctor Who releases The Time of the Daleks, The Wormery and Unregenerate!; and the Judge Dredd releases Get Karter! and Grud Is Dead. As a writer for the company, he contributed the script "The Pelage Project" to the mini-series Counter-Measures and The Revenants, The Alchemists and The Sleeping City for the Companion Chronicles range. He will be writing for the forthcoming Early Adventures range, contributing a First Doctor story entitled The Bounty of Ceres.

Potter's short stories have featured in the collections Short Trips: Zodiac, Short Trips: Companions, Short Trips: The Muses, Short Trips: A Christmas Treasury, Short Trips: Farewells, The Panda Book of Horror and A Romance in Twelve Parts.

He wrote the radio programme No Tomatoes in 2007, a short-lived sketch show in which he also performed.

In 2008, Potter wrote the television history book The Rise and Rise of The Independents for Guerilla Books.

In 2009, he had two documentaries and a play produced for BBC Radio 4 in 2009. Bill Mitchell: The Man Who Wrestled Pumas... Probably, In Search of the Wantley Dragon and Anti-Maccassars and Ylang Ylang Conditioner. Potter stood in for three weeks as presenter of BBC Radio 7's "The Comedy Club"; and contributed to the Radio 4 Archive on 4 profile of actor and writer Ken Campbell.
