= Alan Stevens (writer) =

British writer and producer

Alan Stevens is a British writer and producer who is based in the Southeast of England, where he runs his own audio production company, Magic Bullet Productions, which produces audio dramas based on characters from the Doctor Who universe.

Stevens has produced a number of documentaries, serials and dramas for radio and independent audio release, including the Blake's 7/Doctor Who spinoff series Kaldor City and the second Faction Paradox audio series, and has co-written two guidebooks for Telos Publishing, Liberation: the Unofficial and Unauthorised Guide to Blake's 7 and Fall Out: the Unofficial and Unauthorised Guide to The Prisoner, with Fiona Moore. He writes articles for Celestial Toyroom, the magazine of the Doctor Who Appreciation Society, and has written in the past for Doctor Who Magazine and DWB.

== Print material ==
- "Skull Duggery", with Fiona Moore, in forthcoming anthology Shelf Life
- "The Human Factor: Daleks, the Evil Human and Faustian Legend in Doctor Who" Time and Relative Dissertations in Space, ed. David Butler (2007, Manchester University Press.
- Fall Out: the Unofficial and Unauthorised Guide to The Prisoner (2007)
- Liberation: the Unofficial and Unauthorised Guide to Blake's 7 (2003)
- Zenith (2001) (editor)

== Audios ==
- Kaldor City: The Prisoner (2004) with Fiona Moore
- Kaldor City: Checkmate (2003)
- Kaldor City: Taren Capel (2003)
- Kaldor City: Occam's Razor (2001) with Jim Smith
- The Logic of Empire (1998)
- The Mark of Kane (1996)
- Travis: the Final Act (1990)
