= John Toon =

American actor

- Education: Henry Ford College, Lake Superior State University
- Occupation: Actor
- Website: www.actorjohntoon.com

John Toon is an American actor known for his comedic and dramatic roles across television, film, and commercials.

== Early life and education ==
Toon was born and raised in Dearborn, Michigan. He attended Henry Ford College and later earned a bachelor's degree in psychology with a minor in speech and drama from Lake Superior State University.

== Career ==
Toon began acting at Henry Ford College under the mentorship of Gerry Dzuiblinski. After graduating from Lake Superior State University in 2014, he relocated to New York City to pursue his acting career.

Toon gained recognition for his role in the Pooph commercial and has appeared in TV shows such as American Horror Story, The Equalizer, and The Plot Against America. He has also taken lead roles in indie films such as There's Something Wrong and Chantage.

In addition to acting, Toon co-created comedy sketches with filmmaker Austin Greene, which are featured on the Youtube series Austintatious.
