= Faction Paradox =

Media series

Faction Paradox is a series of novels, audio stories, short story anthologies, and comics set in and around a "War in Heaven", a history-spanning conflict between godlike "Great Houses" and their mysterious enemy. The series is named after a group originally created by author Lawrence Miles for BBC Books' Doctor Who novels.

== Overviews ==
Originally a subplot in the Eighth Doctor Adventures, the War involves several characters and concepts evolved from the original Doctor Who set-up. In several cases, the Faction Paradox series still features these groups, albeit with names changed for reasons both literary (most of the groups or items mentioned are described from different perspectives) and legal (the Faction and the Enemy are Miles's creations, but other elements are not – thus the Great Houses are the Faction Paradox range's equivalent to Doctor Who's Time Lords). Faction Paradox themselves are not the enemy in this War, and play a neutral part, willing to act against both sides in their own interests. Miles has described them as "a ritualistic time-travelling guerrilla organisation".

The semi-mythical founder of Faction Paradox is Grandfather Paradox, named after the grandfather paradox of time travel theory. Originally a member of the Great Houses himself, the Grandfather created a new group after he became frustrated with the ways of the Great Houses. Faction Paradox therefore takes a good deal of pleasure in irritating the Great Houses, and many of their traditions and rituals are aligned in direct opposition to the way the Great Houses do things. Their time machines are bigger on the inside, in much the same way as TARDISes are, and the familial titles its members use (e.g. "Father", "Cousin") reference family units which the Great Houses lost when they became sterile.

Faction Paradox also take a perverse pride in causing time paradoxes (something that is against the laws of the Great Houses) and achieving impossible or absurd effects for their own sake. For instance, they typically wear ritual skull masks which are in fact the skulls of vampirised members of the Great Houses who, in the Great Houses' version of history, never existed. Their stronghold on Earth exists in a version of London, within what they call "The Eleven-Day Empire", bought from the British government in 1752. In that year, the British Empire first adopted the Gregorian calendar, and in so doing had to correct their dating scheme by 11 days (2 September 1752 being followed by 14 September 1752). Faction Paradox claimed the missing 11 days as their base (building on the illogicity that only the numbering scheme changed and no days were actually "missing").

One method of recruitment utilised by the Faction involves infecting others with the Paradox biodata virus, which warps the mind of the infected subject to share the Faction's perspective. A key storyline in the Eighth Doctor's adventures at this time involves the Faction manipulating the Doctor into changing his own history so that the Third Doctor not only regenerates "ahead of schedule" on the planet Dust, but also in a manner that allows him to be infected by a Paradox virus while his system is weakened by his regeneration. While the virus would still be too weak to affect the Doctor immediately, it would gain greater influence on him until the time of his eighth incarnation, at which point the Doctor would be converted to a Faction agent. Fortunately, the TARDIS was aware of this divergence from the timeline and took the infected timeline into itself, thus essentially preserving the timeline where the Doctor wasn't infected even as the timeline where the Doctor becomes a Faction agent still had the potential to exist.

== Stories ==
=== Doctor Who (BBC Books) ===
After a brief mention of Grandfather Paradox in the Virgin New Adventures novel Christmas on a Rational Planet, Faction Paradox and the War in Heaven made their debut in BBC Books' Eighth Doctor novels.

The most relevant books to the Faction Paradox universe are:

- Alien Bodies (Lawrence Miles, 1997)
- Unnatural History (Kate Orman and Jon Blum, 1999)
- Interference: Book One (Shock Tactic) (Lawrence Miles, 1999) - Featuring the Eighth and Third Doctors, Sam, Fitz, Sarah Jane, and K-9, this book shows Sam dealing with matters in her own life while also being an unwitting part, along with the Doctor, of a million-year old year conspiracy with universe-wide effects, and which draws in the Doctor not once, but twice, at different points in time
- Interference: Book Two (The Hour of the Geek) (Lawrence Miles, 1999) - Continuing the story of the previous book, the Doctor finds himself dealing with his enemy across time and space, getting caught between the results of cause and effect coming together. The book also marks Sam's departure, the introduction of new companion Compassion, and culminates in an alternate regeneration for the Third Doctor.
- The Blue Angel (Paul Magrs, 1999)- Featuring the Eighth Doctor, Fitz, Compassion and Iris Wildthyme, the author described the novel as social realist.
- The Taking of Planet 5 (Simon Bucher Jones and Mark Clapham, 1999) - Featuring the Eighth Doctor, Fitz and Compassion, it is partly a sequel to the television serial Image of the Fendahl. It features references to many elements from the Cthulhu Mythos stories of H. P. Lovecraft, in particular the Elder Things and their ancient Antarctic city from At the Mountains of Madness.
- The Shadows of Avalon (Paul Cornell, 2000)
- The Adventuress of Henrietta Street (Lawrence Miles, 2001)

Several other Doctor Who novels featured or referenced Faction Paradox, most notably The Ancestor Cell (written by Stephen Cole and Peter Anghelides in 2000), The Quantum Archangel (written by Craig Hinton in 2001), and The Gallifrey Chronicles (written by Lance Parkin in 2005), but were contradicted or otherwise ignored in the Faction Paradox series.

=== Faction Paradox (BBV) ===
A series of full-cast audio dramas dubbed The Faction Paradox Protocols was produced by BBV between 2001 and 2004. All were written by Lawrence Miles. These stories centred on two Cousins of the Faction, Justine and Eliza. (Justine had previously featured in the BBC novel Alien Bodies, and Eliza appeared in Dead Romance as "Christine Summerfield".) The first two stories were set in the Eleven-Day Empire; the second two in 18th century London; and the last two were split between Justine's pre-Faction past and the Great Houses' prison facility. Although there were six releases and an ongoing story, each pair (usually released close together) formed a two-part story. In order they were:

- The Eleven-Day Empire (2001)
- The Shadow Play (2001)
- Sabbath Dei (2003)
- In the Year of the Cat (2003)
- Movers (2003)
- A Labyrinth of Histories (2004)

June 2021 saw the return to BBV of the series as audio downloads Also, a 5-minute video crossover with BBV's P.R.O.B.E. series was released. Lawrence Miles said of these productions, 'I no longer have full control over the copyright, but I strongly recommend that you don't buy any Faction Paradox material from BBV.'

- Daylight Savings (video crossover with P.R.O.B.E., James Hornby, 2021)
- Eternal Escape (James Hornby, 2021)
- Dionus's War
  - Call Me Ishmael (J.T. Mulholland, 2021)
  - The Healer's Sin (J.T. Mulholland, 2021)
  - Me & My Ghost (Bill Baggs, 2021)
- Sabbath and the King (Aristide Twain, 2021)
- The Confession of Brother Signet (Michael Gilroy-Sinclair, 2021)
- Hellscape
  - Lucifer (Trevor Spencer, 2022)
  - Lucifer's Sleep (Trevor Spencer, 2022)
  - Babylon's Own Personal Hell (Trevor Spencer, 2022)
  - Brother's Keeper (Trevor Spencer, 2022)
  - Unwanted Guest (Trevor Spencer, 2022)
  - Lilith Fades (Trevor Spencer, 2022)

On August 28 2023, BBV Productions continued, as promised, the Hellscape series as a Faction Paradox spin off with the first half of the audio series's second season (titled The Lilium Saga) and a free episode (episode 5) of the video series Hellscape: MorningStar.

=== Faction Paradox (Mad Norwegian Press) ===
In 2002 Mad Norwegian Press published a multi-author faux-encyclopedia to the first 50 years of the War in Heaven, edited by Faction Paradox creator Lawrence Miles, as a companion to the BBV audios. After the success of The Book of the War, Mad Norwegian began publishing a Faction Paradox series of novels set in the same universe. These novels roam the ongoing War in Heaven; despite the series' name, the Faction and its members are not the focus, sometimes featuring only as minor characters, and sometimes not appearing at all. The books also featured characters from the Doctor Who novels, including Chris Cwej and Compassion.

- The Book of the War (Lawrence Miles et al., 2002)
- This Town Will Never Let Us Go (Lawrence Miles, 2003)
- Of the City of the Saved... (Philip Purser-Hallard, 2004)
- Warlords of Utopia (Lance Parkin, 2004)
- Warring States (Mags L Halliday, 2005)
- Erasing Sherlock (Kelly Hale, 2006)

Mad Norwegian also republished the Virgin New Adventures novel Dead Romance as part of their Faction Paradox line in 2003.

=== Faction Paradox (Image Comics) ===
Cover of the first comics issue

In 2003, the first two issues of a Faction Paradox comic were produced by Mad Norwegian and published by Image Comics. The series was subsequently cancelled. The comic was written by Lawrence Miles with art from Jim Calafiore and inks by Peter Palmiotti. It was set after the events of the War in Heaven, though due to its short run it did not give much detail on the post-War universe. It tied into events described in The Faction Paradox Protocols, The Book of the War, and The Adventuress of Henrietta Street.

=== Faction Paradox (Magic Bullet) ===
In 2004, Magic Bullet Productions, known for their Kaldor City audio dramas, obtained the license to produce further Faction Paradox audios, dubbed The True History of Faction Paradox. The narrative of this series continued from The Faction Paradox Protocols, although the first CD was also written to be accessible to newcomers. Like the BBV audios, these stories focused on Cousin Justine and Cousin Eliza, but the characters were recast.

The dramas in the series, released between 2005 and 2009, have featured guest stars including Julian Glover, Peter Miles, Philip Madoc and Gabriel Woolf. Woolf plays the ancient Egyptian god Sutekh, whom he had previously played in the 1975 Doctor Who story Pyramids of Mars. The six titles are:

- Coming To Dust
- The Ship of a Billion Years
- Body Politic
- Words from Nine Divinities
- Ozymandias
- The Judgment of Sutekh

=== Faction Paradox (Random Static) ===
In 2007, New Zealand-based publisher Random Static announced they would be publishing further Faction Paradox novels. What turned out to be the sole title of the new range was published in January 2008. The cover art, by Emma Weakley, won the Sir Julius Vogel Award for Best Artwork in 2009.

- Newtons Sleep (Daniel O'Mahony, 2008)

=== Faction Paradox (Obverse Books) ===
In June 2010, Obverse Books acquired a license to produce collections of Faction Paradox short stories and longer fiction.

- A Romance in Twelve Parts (ed Stuart Douglas, 2011)
- Burning with Optimism's Flames (ed Julian Eales, 2012)
- Against Nature (Lawrence Burton, 2013)
- The Brakespeare Voyage (Simon Bucher-Jones and Jonathan Dennis, 2013)
- Liberating Earth (ed Kate Orman, 2015)
- Head of State (Andrew Hickey, 2015)
- Weapons Grade Snake Oil (Blair Bidmead, 2017)
- Spinning Jenny (Dale Smith, 2017)
- The Book of the Enemy (ed Simon Bucher-Jones, 2018)
- The Book of the Peace (ed Philip Marsh, 2018)

==== Faction Hollywood ====
In 2019, Obverse Books published a first story featuring Faction Hollywood, a group introduced by Jonathan Dennis in The Book of the War.

- Hyponormalisation: A Faction Hollywood Production (Jonathan Dennis, as part of An Obverse Sextet, 2019)

=== Worlds of the Spiral Politic ===
- The Boulevard: Volume 1 (ed Stuart Douglas, 2022)
- Inward Collapse (Lawrence Burton, 2023)
- The Boulevard: Volume 2 (ed Stuart Douglas, 2024)

==== The City of the Saved ====
In 2012, Obverse Books launched a series of anthologies set in the City of the Saved, a setting first introduced and explored in the Faction Paradox series.

- Tales of the City (ed Philip Purser-Hallard, 2012)
- More Tales of the City (ed Philip Purser-Hallard, 2013)
- Tales of the Great Detectives (ed Philip Purser-Hallard, 2014)
- Furthest Tales of the City (ed Philip Purser-Hallard, 2015)
- Tales of the Civil War (ed Philip Purser-Hallard, 2017)
- Stranger Tales of the City (ed Elizabeth Evershed, 2018)
- Vanishing Tales of the City (novella, by Kara Dennison, as part of An Obverse Sextet, 2019)
