= George Mann (writer) =

British novelist

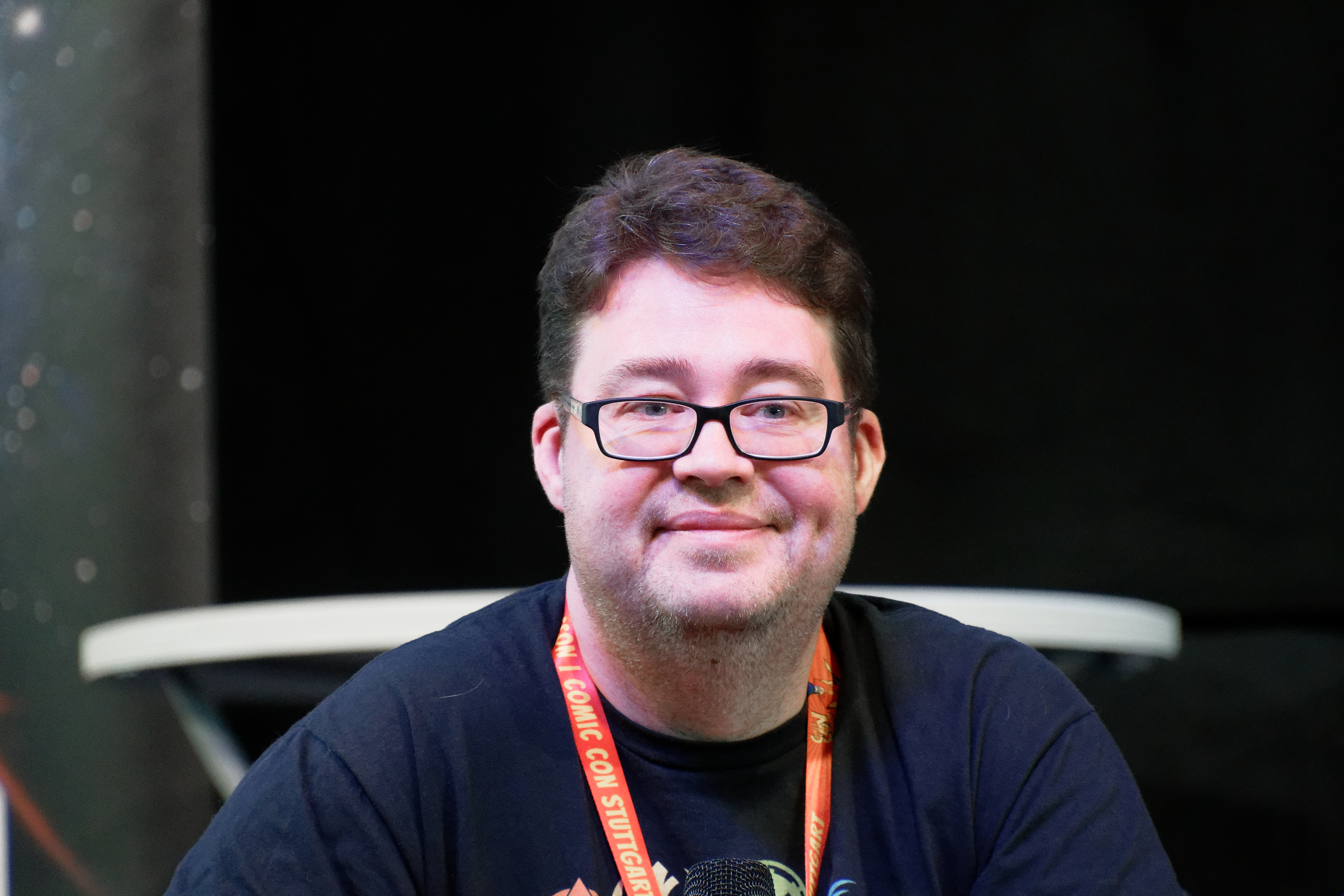
- Occupations: Novelist, editor
- Notable work: Newbury and Hobbes; Ghosts of Manhattan; The Solaris Book of New Science Fiction; Doctor Who novel series

George Mann is a British author and editor, primarily in genre fiction, and is best known for his alternate history detective novel series Newbury and Hobbes (2008–2019) and The Ghosts action science fiction noir novels (2010–2017), a book series set in the same universe.

Mann works in Nottinghamshire and lives in Lincolnshire. He is a former editor of Outland Magazine, and has also edited a number of anthologies, including The Solaris Book of New Science Fiction (Volumes 1, 2 and 3), The Solaris Book of New Fantasy and two retrospective collections of Sexton Blake stories, Sexton Blake, Detective, which has an introduction by Michael Moorcock and Sexton Blake, Crime Fighter.

Mann is the author of The Human Abstract, The Severed Man, a novella in the series the Time Hunter, and co-author of the series finale, Child of Time. He has also written numerous short stories, and original Doctor Who novels. In 2011 he wrote a new Sherlock Holmes audiobook as well. The novels The Affinity Bridge and The Osiris Ritual marked the beginning of his Newbury and Hobbes detective series.

== Newbury and Hobbes novel series ==
Mann has published four novels and several stories subtitled A Newbury & Hobbes or A Maurice Newbury investigation. These are steampunk adventures, set in Victorian England, featuring Sir Maurice Newbury, a gentleman "investigator for the Crown" (reminiscent of Mycroft Holmes), and his assistant Miss Veronica Hobbes who, unbeknownst to him, is an agent of the Queen as well. This is an ongoing series that will consist of at least six novels.

In November 2012, Obverse Books released a Newbury and Hobbes Annual, with contents modelled on the World Distributor Annuals which were popular in the UK in the 70s and 80s. The Annual contains new stories, a boardgame, crossword and a comic strip, in the same manner as those earlier annuals.

== The Ghosts novel series ==
Although not part of the Newbury & Hobbes franchise, Mann continued to expand upon its setting with the novel Ghosts of Manhattan and its sequels, Ghosts of War, Ghosts of Karnak, and Ghosts of Empire. Set twenty-five years after Newbury & Hobbes, the stories follow a new cast of characters, initially taking place in New York City in an alternate history version of the Roaring Twenties. Ghosts embraces a Decopunk aesthetic, depicting anachronistic coal-powered future technology and pulp heroes battling eldritch horrors and the occult in the shadows of 1920s Manhattan and beyond. Mann has dubbed this series The Ghosts after one of its lead protagonists, Gabriel Cross, a broken World War One veteran-turned-vigilante who assumes an alter ego called The Ghost and battles organized crime corrupted by supernatural forces, while struggling with the horrors of his own past.

On 15 October 2020 Legion M announced they were developing an adult animated television series with Powerhouse Animation based on The Ghosts novels, with Aaron Waltke attached as showrunner and Michael Uslan as executive producer of the project.

== Bibliography ==
=== Novels ===
- The Human Abstract (ISBN 978-1903889657) (Telos, 2004)
- Wychwood (2017): a legend of occult practices in the ancient forest of Wychwood is the basis for a modern crime story.

Sherlock Holmes

- The Will of the Dead (ISBN 978-1781160015 (Titan Books, 2013)
- The Spirit Box (Titan Books, 2014)

Doctor Who

- Paradox Lost (ISBN 978-1849902359) (BBCbooks, 2011)
- Engines of War (ISBN 978-1849908481) (BBCbooks, 2014)

The Ghosts series

- Ghosts of Manhattan (ISBN 978-1616141943) (Pyr, 2010)
- Ghosts of War (ISBN 978-1616143671) (Pyr, 2011)
- Ghosts of Karnak (ISBN 978-1783294169) (Titan Books, 2016)
- Ghosts of Empire (ISBN 978-1783294183) (Titan Books, 2017)

Newbury & Hobbes series

- The Affinity Bridge (ISBN 978-1905005888) (Snowbooks, 2008)
- "The Hambleton Affair" (Newbury and Hobbes short story) – appeared in the hardcover edition of The Affinity Bridge, free PDF available for download. Included in The Casebook of Newbury & Hobbes.
- "The Shattered Teacup" (Snowbooks, 2010) (free PDF eBook/Audiobook download)* Included in The Casebook of Newbury & Hobbes.
- The Osiris Ritual (ISBN 978-1906727048) (Snowbooks, 2009)
- "What Lies Beneath" (short story), free PDF available for download Included in The Casebook of Newbury & Hobbes.
- The Immorality Engine (ISBN 978-1906727185) (Snowbooks, 2011)
- The Executioner's Heart (ISBN 978-1781160053) (Titan Books, 2013)
- The Revenant Express (ISBN 9780765334091) (Titan Books, 2019)
- The Casebook of Newbury & Hobbes Collection (ISBN 978-1781167427) (Titan Books, 2013)
- The Albion Initiative (ISBN 978-1-250-85236-6) (Tor Books, 2022)

=== Graphic novels ===
Dark Souls

- The Breath of Andolus (ISBN 978-1785853661) (Titan Books, 2016)
- Legends of the Flame (ISBN 978-1785861666) (Titan Books, 2017)
- Winter's Spite (ISBN 978-1785853678) (Titan Books, 2017)

Doctor Who

- The Lost Dimension (ISBN 978-1785863462) (Titan Books, 2017)
- Supremacy of the Cybermen (ISBN 978-1785856846) (Titan Books, 2016)
- Ghost Stories (ISBN 978-1785861703) (Titan Books, 2017)
- The Eighth Doctor: A Matter of Life and Death (ISBN 978-1782767534) (Titan Books, 2017)
- The Eleventh Doctor: The Sapling Vol. 2: Roots (ISBN 978-1785860959) (Titan Books, 2017)
- The Twelfth Doctor: Hyperion (ISBN 978-1782767442) (Titan Books, 2016)
- The Twelfth Doctor: The Terror Beneath (ISBN 978-1785860829) (Titan Books, 2017)
- The Twelfth Doctor: The Twist (ISBN 978-1785853210) (Titan Books, 2017)

Warhammer 40,000

- Will of Iron (ISBN 978-1785858123) (Titan Books, 2016)
- Revelations (ISBN 978-1785858130) (Titan Books, 2017)
- The Fallen (ISBN 978-1785858604) (Titan Books, 2018)

Newbury & Hobbes

- The Undying (ISBN 978-1782760399) (Titan Comics, 2019)

=== Novellas ===
Time Hunter series

- The Severed Man (ISBN 978-1903889435) (Telos, 2004)
- Child of Time (ISBN 978-1845831042)(Telos, 2007) (with David J Howe)

Judges series

- Lone Wolf (January 2019)

=== Short stories ===
- "Methuselah" in Short Trips: Transmissions (Big Finish, 2008)
- "The Hambleton Affair" (Newbury and Hobbes short story) (Snowbooks, 2008; appeared in the hardcover edition of The Affinity Bridge]
- "The Shattered Teacup" (Newbury and Hobbes short story) (Snowbooks, 2010)
- "The Cull" in The Obverse Book of Ghosts (Obverse Books, 2010)
- "Annabel Regina" in Iris: Abroad (Obverse Books, 2010)
- "Rise and Fall" in Short Trips: Volume 1 (Big Finish, 2010)
- "The Albino's Shadow" in Zenith Lives! (Obverse Books, 2011)

=== Short story collections ===
- The Sacrificial Pawn and Other Stories (Obverse Books, 2011)
- The Newbury & Hobbes Annual 2013 (Obverse Books, 2012)
- The Casebook of Newbury & Hobbes (ISBN 978-1781167427) (Titan Books, 2013)

=== Non-fiction ===
- The Mammoth Encyclopedia of Science Fiction (ISBN 978-1841191775) (2001)
- The Gollancz Encyclopedia of SF Technology (ISBN 978-0575074217) (Gollancz, 2006)

=== Audiobooks ===
- The Pyralis Effect (Doctor Who: The Companion Chronicles) (ISBN 978-1844354276) (Big Finish, 2010)
- The Shattered Teacup (Newbury and Hobbes) (Snowbooks, 2010)
- Helion Rain (Warhammer 40000) (ISBN 184-9700176) (The Black Library, 2011)
- Child of Time (Time Hunter) (ISBN 978-1906263218) (Fantom Films Limited, 2011)
- The Reification of Hans Gerber (Sherlock Holmes) (ISBN 978-1844355921) (2011)
- Labyrinth of Sorrows (ISBN 978-1849701327) (The Black Library, 2012)

The Shattered Teacup was offered as a free download by Snowbooks, it has however since been removed from their website

=== As editor ===
- The Solaris Book of New Science Fiction (ISBN 978-1844164486) (Solaris, 2007)
- The Solaris Book of New Science Fiction, Volume Two (ISBN 978-1844165421) (Solaris, 2008)
- The Solaris Book of New Science Fiction, Volume Three (ISBN 978-1844167098)(Solaris, 2009)
- The Solaris Book of New Fantasy (ISBN 978-1844165230) (Solaris, 2007)
- The Solaris Book of New Fantasy II (ISBN 978-1844167609) (Solaris, 2009)
- Sexton Blake: Detective (ISBN 978-1906727413) (Snowbooks, 2009)
- Sexton Blake, Crime Fighter (ISBN 978-1906727499) (Snowbooks, 2010)
- Encounters of Sherlock Holmes (ISBN 978-1781160039) (Titan Books, 2013)
- Further Encounters of Sherlock Holmes (ISBN 978-1781160046) (Titan Books, 2014)
- A Clockwork Iris (Obverse Books, 2017)
