= Lawrence Miles =

British writer

- Born: February 15, 1972 (age 54) Middlesex
- Area: Writer

Lawrence Miles (born 15 March 1972 in Middlesex) is a science fiction author known for his work on original Doctor Who novels (for both the Virgin New Adventures and BBC Books series) and the subsequent spin-off Faction Paradox. He is also co-author (with Tat Wood) of the About Time series of Doctor Who critiques.

== Life and work ==
Miles's first professionally published fiction was a 3-page comic strip, illustrated by Richard Elson and run under the generic title Tharg's Time Twisters in the weekly science fiction anthology comic 2000 AD. It appeared in issue 722 (March 1991) and to date is Miles's only contribution to 2000 AD.

Miles's major contribution to the Doctor Who expanded universe is the "War in Heaven" arc begun in his novel Alien Bodies. He has also written several novels and short stories outside this arc.

After most of the elements contributed by Miles were removed from the BBC novel range in the novel The Ancestor Cell, Miles reused the major elements of this arc, without the Doctor Who references, to create the Faction Paradox universe, which now encompasses books, comic books and audio dramas.

Miles used his web site The Beasthouse, where he has posted since 2004, initially as a venue for "analysis of British popular culture using the UK Hit Parade as a framework and all-purpose excuse." Since then, its format shifted often, from actual diary format entries to postings consisting simply of lists. The domain "beasthouse.co.uk" now belongs to a different owner.

His weekly reviews of Doctor Who episodes can be found on his other blog, Lawrence Miles' Doctor Who Thing. In May 2008, Miles temporarily posted online a spec script for the TV series titled "Book of the World", in a self-described attempt to provide a legitimate basis for his polarising criticisms of the production team behind the revived series.

== About Time ==
Miles is the co-author of the first five volumes of About Time, a Doctor Who episode guide which examines the series in its cultural and historical context. Co-written with Tat Wood, the guide contains detailed accounts of the various concerns that fed into the making of the series and a number of essays answering specific questions (e.g. "How might the sonic screwdriver work?" and "Why didn't they just spend more money?"). In contrast to other Doctor Who guides, About Time is divided by "era" rather than by the lead actor, broadly reflecting different production philosophies and cultural climates. The several volumes are published in order of popularity rather than chronologically; volumes three and four were published first, covering the early and late 1970s. There are six volumes in total, the last covering the late eighties, the 1996 television movie and everything up to, but not including, the new 2005 series. Miles chose to leave the project after the completion of volume two, and the sixth and final volume was written by Wood. The sixth volume also featured additional material by publisher Lars Pearson.

== Bibliography ==
=== Doctor Who ===
- Virgin New Adventures:
  - Christmas on a Rational Planet (featuring the 7th Doctor, Chris Cwej, and Roz Forrester)
  - Down (featuring Bernice Summerfield)
  - Dead Romance (featuring Chris Cwej)
- Eighth Doctor Adventures:
  - Alien Bodies (ISBN 9780563405771)
  - Interference: Book One, "Shock Tactic" (ISBN 9780563555803)
  - Interference: Book Two, "The Hour of the Geek" (ISBN 9780563555827)
  - The Adventuress of Henrietta Street (ISBN 9780563538424)
- "The Judgement of Solomon", short story from Decalog 5: Wonders (featuring Bernice Summerfield)
- "Vrs", short short story from Short Trips and Sidesteps
- The Adolescence of Time, audio drama from Big Finish (featuring Bernice Summerfield)

=== Faction Paradox ===
- Books (published by Mad Norwegian Press):
  - The Book of the War (fictional work presented in the form of an encyclopaedic guide to the Faction Paradox universe, edited and co-written by Miles)
  - This Town Will Never Let Us Go (first in the series of Faction Paradox novels)
  - Dead Romance (re-issue of the Virgin title, includes short stories "Toy Story" and "Grass")
- Audio dramas:
  - (produced by BBV):
    - The Eleven Day Empire
    - The Shadow Play
    - Sabbath Dei
    - In the Year of the Cat
    - Movers
    - A Labyrinth of Histories
  - (produced by Magic Bullet Productions):
    - Coming to Dust
    - The Ship of a Billion Years
    - Body Politic
    - Words of Nine Divinities
    - Ozymandias
    - The Judgment of Sutekh
- Comics:
  - Faction Paradox #1–2 (with Jim Calafiore, Image Comics, 2003)

=== Other short stories ===
- Tharg's Time Twisters: "Wraggs to Riches" (with Richard Elson, in 2000 AD No. 722, 1991)
- "Toy Story",Perfect Timing 2 (December 1999), edited by Helen Fayle and Julian Eales
- "Grass", The Magazine of Fantasy and Science Fiction issue 599 (September 2001), edited by Gordon van Gelder; also appeared in The Year's Best Fantasy and Horror 15th Annual Collection (2002), edited by Ellen Datlow and Terri Windling

=== Non-fiction ===
- (published by Mad Norwegian Press):
  - About Time: The Unauthorised Guide to Doctor Who: 1963–1966: Seasons 1 to 3 (co-written with Tat Wood)
  - About Time: The Unauthorised Guide to Doctor Who: 1966–1969: Seasons 4 to 6 (co-written with Tat Wood)
  - About Time: The Unauthorised Guide to Doctor Who: 1970–1974: Seasons 7 to 11 (co-written with Tat Wood)
  - About Time: The Unauthorised Guide to Doctor Who: 1975–1979: Seasons 12 to 17 (co-written with Tat Wood)
  - About Time: The Unauthorised Guide to Doctor Who: 1980–1984: Seasons 18 to 21 (co-written with Tat Wood)
  - Dusted: The Unauthorised Guide to Buffy The Vampire Slayer (co-written with Lars Pearson and Christa Dickson)
