= Longest Day (novel) =

1998 novel by Michael Collier

- Author: Michael Collier
- Series: Doctor Who book: Eighth Doctor Adventures
- Release number: 9
- Subject: Featuring: Eighth Doctor; Sam
- Publisher: BBC Books
- Publication date: March 1998
- ISBN: 0-563-40581-3
- Preceded by: Option Lock
- Followed by: Legacy of the Daleks

Longest Day is an original novel credited to Michael Collier. Based on the long-running British science fiction television series Doctor Who, it features the Eighth Doctor and Sam.

== Synopsis ==
Hirath is a planet ravaged by overlapping time fields. There are those who seek to exploit this for monetary gain and there is an invading alien race out to just kill.

== Continuity ==
The Doctor and Samantha Jones become separated in this novel, and the next three novels see the Doctor searching for his missing companion. They aren't reunited until the events of Seeing I.

== Writing ==
The book was written by range editor Steve Cole. As BBC Books did not want the editor writing books for the series, Cole asked his friend, Michael Collier, for permission to publish under his name. Cole had Rebecca Levene edit the book.

Cole and Collier repeated the arrangement for The Taint. Collier later became an author of historical fiction in his own right. In a 2022 interview, Cole described the process of writing the book as very rushed and the result as largely "dreadful".
