= History 101 (novel) =

2002 novel by Mags L. Halliday

- Author: Mags L Halliday
- Series: Doctor Who book: Eighth Doctor Adventures
- Release number: 58
- Subject: Featuring: Eighth Doctor; Fitz and Anji
- Publisher: BBC Books
- Publication date: July 2002
- Pages: 275
- ISBN: 0-563-53854-6
- Preceded by: The Crooked World
- Followed by: Camera Obscura

History 101 is a BBC Books original novel written by Mags L Halliday and based on the long-running British science fiction television series Doctor Who. It features the Eighth Doctor, Fitz and Anji.

== Synopsis ==
Set in the Spanish Civil War, the book (Halliday's first novel) explores the construction of history and the experiences of George Orwell.

The Doctor, Fitz, and Anji, after viewing Pablo Picasso's "Guernica" at the 1937 Paris exhibition, realise time has been changed. They travel back to Spain in order to uncover what affected the artist's vision of this terrible event.

== Author ==
Liz Halliday (born 1971) is a British author who writes under the name "Mags L Halliday" in Doctor Who-series of science fiction. She is distinct from the writer Liz Holliday, who has also contributed to Doctor Who-related science fiction. In addition to History 101 (2002) she contributed to the Faction Paradox series including the novel Warring States (2005).

== Reception ==
In Interzone, Matt Hills writes, "The strengths of this book lie in its own historical research - displayed via a bibliographical list of reading - and in its depiction of an alien race that objectively seeks to record history, the Absolute. [...] Notable for its cubist-inspired fragmentation of perspective, and its Orwellian clock that strikes 13, this addition to the range's story arc is a satisfying read in its own right."

In Continuum, Alan McKee writes, "Setting her story of time-travelling aliens in the midst of the Spanish civil war, and using Picasso's Guernica as a metaphor for the multiple perspectives from which humans see the world around them, Halliday argues that it is precisely the act of making sense - the existence of culture - which defines humanity. More than this, sensemaking is - she argues, necessarily subjective, and an aspiration to 'objectivity' is not only impossible, but undesirable."

Piers D. Britton, in TARDISbound: Navigating the Universes of Doctor Who, describes the book as "one of the most intricate and demanding" of the Eighth Doctor Adventures, and states "History 101 digs deep into the heartland concerns of Dr. Who: the flow of time and possibility."

== Notes ==
History 101 is the only EDA not to have an italicised note at the end of the back cover blurb identifying it as "another in the series of adventures of the Eighth Doctor". The blurb describes the novel as if it were a history textbook, and the last paragraph continues this conceit by explaining it should be read as part of "the ongoing 'Doctor Who: Eighth Doctor' history course".

The chapter names are all Clash song titles, translated into Catalan (for example, "Una Casa Europea Segura"="Safe European Home").
