= The Last Resort (novel) =

2003 novel by Paul Leonard

- Author: Paul Leonard
- Series: Doctor Who book: Eighth Doctor Adventures
- Release number: 64
- Subject: Featuring: Eighth Doctor; Fitz, Anji, Trix
- Publisher: BBC Books
- Publication date: June 2003
- Pages: 288
- ISBN: 0-563-48605-8
- Preceded by: Reckless Engineering
- Followed by: Timeless

The Last Resort is a BBC Books original novel written by Paul Leonard and based on the long-running British science fiction television series Doctor Who. It features the Eighth Doctor, Fitz and Anji.

== Plot ==
This story begins with Fitz and Anji working for the Good Times Inc. Company. They are working undercover for the Doctor, who is shocked to discover a company that is selling holidays in time.

The climax of the story results in the destruction of billions of universes. The Doctor and Sabbath realise all time travellers must be stopped, to prevent these events from happening again. However, at the end of the book a man reveals he has a time-travel machine and proceeds to begin interfering in time once again.
