= The Face-Eater =

1999 novel by Simon Messingham

- Author: Simon Messingham
- Series: Doctor Who book: Eighth Doctor Adventures
- Release number: 18
- Subject: Featuring: Eighth Doctor; Sam
- Publisher: BBC Books
- Publication date: January 1999
- ISBN: 0-563-55569-6
- Preceded by: Beltempest
- Followed by: The Taint

The Face-Eater is an original novel written by Simon Messingham and based on the long-running British science fiction television series Doctor Who. It features the Eighth Doctor and Sam.

== Plot ==
On Earth's first space colony, Proxima II, an expedition to a nearby mountain disappears and only one survivor, Jake Leary, returns, apparently turned insane by the experience, he breaks out of hospital and vanishes. Afterwards mutilated bodies begin appearing on the streets, causing the colony's workers to send a distress signal against the wishes of their leader, Helen Percival.

The Doctor and Sam arrive in response to the signal, causing Percival to become paranoid that she will be overthrown. despite this, she allows The Doctor to investigate. Sam learns that Percival burned the bodies without an autopsy and breaks into Helen's office to investigate and sets off a bomb planted to stop intruders, and is saved by Police Chief Fuller. Meanwhile, the Doctor speaks to xenozoologist Joan Betts, who is studying the native Proximans, who are dying out suddenly. The Doctor theorises that the Proxians have telepathic powers which are focused on the mountain, trapping something in. When The Doctor attempts to contact their group mind, he learns that they are under threat from an ancient evil. When The Doctor follows Joan into the sewers later that day, something attacks them which kills Joan and knocks him unconscious.

Percival begins to oppress the colonists, sparking off riots, whilst Sam and Fuller read Leary's report which explain that the expedition woke an ancient evil which was dormant in the mountains. Later Fuller reveals that he is a shape shifter which has killed the real Fuller. However Sam escapes when a Proximan attacks the creature. The Doctor is brought to the officers, where he explains that an ancient creature called the Face-Eater has been sending out shape shifters to gather life essences for it to eat. Leary enters and explains that this Doctor is a shape shifter - the real one was with him in the mountains, and that it was a shape shifter impersonating him that is responsible for the murders.

The Doctor finds the Face-Eater with a Proximan's help and learns that the Proximans built the Face-Eater as a focal point for their group mind in case of attack, but it soon began to eat all life on the planet until it was subdued, but the colonists have woken it again. The Face-Eater then becomes strong enough to move by itself and attacks the settlement. After Percival fails to launch a nuclear strike to wipe out the colony, she is killed by a worker. The Face-Eater attempts to absorb The Doctor, but is confused by his dormant personalities, allowing the Proximans to attack it. Finding the control unit, the Proximans shut down the Face-Eater, which also shuts down their group mind mentally degenerating them into little more than animals. The Doctor and Sam then leave.
