= Dominion (Walters novel) =

1999 novel by Nick Walters

- Author: Nick Walters
- Series: Doctor Who book: Eighth Doctor Adventures
- Release number: 22
- Subject: Featuring: Eighth Doctor; Sam and Fitz
- Publisher: BBC Books
- Publication date: May 1999
- ISBN: 0-563-55574-2
- Preceded by: Revolution Man
- Followed by: Unnatural History

Dominion is an original novel written by Nick Walters and based on the long-running British science fiction television series Doctor Who. It features the Eighth Doctor, Sam and Fitz.

== Synopsis Book 1 ==
Kerstin and her boyfriend Johan swim in a lake near a cabin in Sweden. Later that night, Kerstin goes to get some food from the fridge. An immense bolt of lightning strikes the ground, knocking her over. When she wakes up, she finds the whole front of the cabin gone, including Johan. After finding no reasonable explanation, Kerstin realises that she may have lost Johan forever. Kerstin goes to a nearby farm.

The owner of the farm, Björn Andersson wakes up at three in the morning. He remembers that he fell into a drunken rage about putting off fixing the farm's power generator. As he walks down to the pen, he hears the pigs screaming. Björn grabs his shotgun and hurries back to the pen. He walks to the pen where the screaming is coming from, and finds that there is blood everywhere. There were 12 piglets and a sow in the pen. A strange creature lunges at Björn. Björn manages to kill it with the shotgun, before passing out.

At the hospital, Nordenstam approaches with Dr Lindgard, who says that Johan's sedatives will wear off in a couple of hours. The Doctor and Fitz arrive at the hospital, and Dr Lindgard tells the Doctor that Johan is stable. The Doctor wants to examine Johan, but Lindgard refuses. The Doctor barges into the isolation ward anyway. After examining Johan, the Doctor pulls Fitz aside and says that he's going to go back and check on the TARDIS, and that Fitz should stay here with Kerstin who is visiting Johan. The Doctor and Nordenstam go back to the forest, and Nordenstam gives Fitz his mobile phone so Fitz can call him if anything happens. Kerstin asks Fitz if he knows what happened to Johan and about the thing in the barn, but Fitz cannot give her an answer.

At the bottom of the stairs, Björn gets torn apart by the aliens. The Doctor realises that he needs the TARDIS to make accurate judgements. They make it up to Kerstin's room. Fitz tries to call Nordenstam, but the mobile phone's battery runs out. The State Biohazard Detection Unit arrive, and use a flamethrower to kill the aliens. The aliens outside the bedroom stop scrabbling at the door. As The Doctor steps outside, he finds them all dead on the floor for no reason. The Doctor, Fitz and Kerstin are approached by two members of the unit, and one of them turns out to be Lindgard. He tranquillises The Doctor, but Fitz and Kerstin manage to escape into the forest.

== Synopsis Book 2 ==
Sam wakes up in a strange low-gravity dimension, with a sky that looks like a sea, and finds her things from the TARDIS room scattered everywhere. She also notices a strange black disturbance in the sky, which looks like a hole. She finds a tunnel and starts to follow it.

Fitz and Kerstin keep running through the forest until they get tired. Kerstin asks Fitz who he really is, and is shocked when he tells her. Some members of the State Biohazard Detection Unit walk past them, and Fitz and Kerstin follow them.

The Doctor wakes up in a strange, gaudy-coloured room and starts examining it.

Sam finds two strange, frog-like creatures playing in an ocean at the end of the tunnel. She accidentally catches their attention, but then they start playing with her. Eventually, they leave, and Sam follows them to find two adult aliens. The adults take Sam towards a strange, flying, leaf-like vehicle. It starts flying towards one of the sky-seas.

Synopsis Incomplete
