= Dreamstone Moon =

1998 novel by Paul Leonard

- Author: Paul Leonard
- Series: Doctor Who book: Eighth Doctor Adventures
- Release number: 11
- Subject: Featuring: Eighth Doctor; Sam
- Publisher: BBC Books
- Publication date: May 1998
- ISBN: 0-563-40585-6
- Preceded by: Legacy of the Daleks
- Followed by: Seeing I

Dreamstone Moon is an original novel written by Paul Leonard and based on the long-running British science fiction television series Doctor Who. It features the Eighth Doctor and Sam.
