= Reckless Engineering =

2003 novel by Nick Walters

- Author: Nick Walters
- Series: Doctor Who book: Eighth Doctor Adventures
- Release number: 63
- Subject: Featuring: Eighth Doctor; Fitz, Anji, Trix
- Publisher: BBC Books
- Publication date: April 2003
- Pages: 288
- ISBN: 0-563-48603-1
- Preceded by: The Domino Effect
- Followed by: The Last Resort

Reckless Engineering is a BBC Books original novel written by Nick Walters and based on the long-running British science fiction television series Doctor Who. It features the Eighth Doctor, Fitz, Anji and Trix.

== Plot ==
The story is set in an alternate universe and features Isambard Kingdom Brunel; the cover is based on a famous photo of Brunel standing in front of the launching chains for the SS Great Eastern.

Set during the 1840s, the Doctor and his companions arrive during the Industrial Revolution in England, and learn that an inventor has been ordered by an alien force to construct a machine known as the Utopia Engine, a machine that will cause the entire planet to rapidly age. Anybody below the age of puberty will survive, but those above it will age to death.

Brunel, who has unknowingly been supplying parts for this engine, unites with the Doctor to destroy the engine after learning of the post-apocalyptic future the Doctor has foreseen.
