= Kursaal =

Kursaal may refer to:

- Kursaal (amusement park), an amusement park in Southend-on-Sea, Essex, England
- Kursaal (ward), a council ward in Southend-on-Sea, Essex, England
- Casinò Lugano, previously named Kursaal
- Dome Cinema, Worthing, previously named the Kursaal
- Royal Hall, Harrogate, previously named the Kursaal
- Villa Marina, Isle of Man, previously named the Kursaal
- Kursaal Congress Centre and Auditorium, a convention centre in San Sebastián, Spain
- Kursaal, in Interlaken, Switzerland
- Kursaal (novel), a novel by Peter Anghelides
