= Grimm Reality =

2001 novel by Simon Bucher-Jones and Kelly Hale

- Author: Simon Bucher-Jones and Kelly Hale
- Series: Doctor Who book: Eighth Doctor Adventures
- Release number: 50
- Subject: Featuring: Eighth Doctor; Fitz and Anji
- Publisher: BBC Books
- Publication date: October 2001
- Pages: 276
- ISBN: 0-563-53841-4
- Preceded by: The City of the Dead
- Followed by: The Adventuress of Henrietta Street

Grimm Reality is a BBC Books original novel written by Simon Bucher-Jones and Kelly Hale and based on the long-running British science fiction television series Doctor Who. It features the Eighth Doctor, Fitz and Anji.

The novel's secondary title is The Marvellous Adventures of Doctor Know-All.

== Reception ==
Grimm Reality won Best Book in the 2001 Jade Pagoda Awards.
