= Time Zero =

2002 novel by Justin Richards

- Author: Justin Richards
- Series: Doctor Who book: Eighth Doctor Adventures
- Release number: 60
- Subject: Featuring: Eighth Doctor; Fitz, Anji, Trix
- Publisher: BBC Books
- Publication date: September 2002
- Pages: 275
- ISBN: 0-563-53866-X
- Preceded by: Camera Obscura
- Followed by: The Infinity Race

Time Zero is a BBC Books original novel written by Justin Richards and based on the long-running British science fiction television series Doctor Who. It features the Eighth Doctor, Fitz and Anji and introduces a new companion, Trix.

== Plot ==
A story arc about the Multiverse collapsing begins in this novel, ending in Timeless
