= The Tomorrow Windows =

2004 novel by Jonathan Morris

- Author: Jonathan Morris
- Series: Doctor Who book: Eighth Doctor Adventures
- Release number: 69
- Subject: Featuring: Eighth Doctor; Fitz, Trix
- Publisher: BBC Books
- Publication date: 7 June 2004
- ISBN: 978-0-563-48616-9
- Preceded by: Halflife
- Followed by: The Sleep of Reason

The Tomorrow Windows is a BBC Books original novel written by Jonathan Morris and based on the long-running British science fiction television series Doctor Who. It features the Eighth Doctor, Fitz and Trix

== Plot summary ==
The central plot revolves around windows that allow people to see into their planet's future.

== Notes ==
- The novel includes an appearance by London politician Ken Livingstone, who gave permission for Morris to use him as a character.
- Other celebrities attending the exhibition at Tate Modern are: Stephen Hawking, Jeremy Paxman, Ian Hislop, Michael Grade, Salman Rushdie, Ricky Gervais, Joanne Rowling, Bill Bailey, Stephen Fry, Richard Curtis and Ben Elton. Some of the unnamed guests are mentioned as recognising Fitz from the novel Sometime Never...
