= Demontage =

1999 novel by Justin Richards

- Author: Justin Richards
- Series: Doctor Who book: Eighth Doctor Adventures
- Release number: 20
- Subject: Featuring: Eighth Doctor; Sam, Fitz
- Publisher: BBC Books
- Publication date: March 1999
- ISBN: 0-563-55572-6
- Preceded by: The Taint
- Followed by: Revolution Man

Demontage is an original novel written by Justin Richards and based on the long-running British science fiction television series Doctor Who. It features the Eighth Doctor, Sam and Fitz.

== Summary ==
The Vega Station is a neutral space for two warring factions; a peaceful shopping and cultural center for many. Or so it seems. When the Doctor, Sam and Fitz turn up, each get sucked into various intrigues that threaten the peace. Not only that, monsters roam the corridor and a hitman is setting up his kill.
