= Camera Obscura (Rose novel) =

2002 novel by Lloyd Rose

- Author: Lloyd Rose
- Series: Doctor Who book: Eighth Doctor Adventures
- Release number: 59
- Subject: Featuring: Eighth Doctor; Fitz and Anji
- Publisher: BBC Books
- Publication date: August 2002
- Pages: 280
- ISBN: 0-563-53857-0
- Preceded by: History 101
- Followed by: Time Zero

Camera Obscura is a BBC Books original novel written by Lloyd Rose and based on the long-running British science fiction television series Doctor Who. It features the Eighth Doctor, Fitz and Anji.

== Plot ==
The Doctor's second heart was taken by his ally time traveler Sabbath. But because of new danger he starts to work with Sabbath again to pursue Dartmoor to unravel his new mysteries.

== Continuity ==
The storyline concerning the Doctor's missing heart is resolved in this novel.

George Williamson reappears in Time Zero. The previous seven Doctors appear in the time machine's mirrors.

== Reception ==
In a 2003 Interzone review, Matt Hills writes, "The novel certainly carries a weighty, portentous sweep: rarely has the Doctor descended into Hell and confronted Death. This style of theological fantasy may be at odds with the science-fictional perspective of History 101, but Camera Obscura does what so many recent BBC Worldwide Who books have done: it brings an adult, knowing perspective to the pleasures of a format that was sometimes rather more childlike while on TV." In a 2002 Interzone review, Paul Beardsley writes, "The interaction between the TARDIS crew and Sabbath is enjoyable, and the prose is good too, but the novel reads like an early draft submitted in haste. Lloyd Rose is capable of much better."
