= Revolution Man =

1999 novel by Paul Leonard

- Author: Paul Leonard
- Series: Doctor Who book: Eighth Doctor Adventures
- Release number: 21
- Subject: Featuring: Eighth Doctor; Sam and Fitz
- Publisher: BBC Books
- Publication date: April 1999
- ISBN: 0-563-55570-X
- Preceded by: Demontage
- Followed by: Dominion

Revolution Man is an original novel written by Paul Leonard and based on the long-running British science fiction television series Doctor Who. It features the Eighth Doctor, Sam and Fitz.

== Plot ==
The Doctor tries to stop a mysterious entity called The Revolution Man from spreading mind-altering drugs in the 1960s.
