= The Sleep of Reason (Day novel) =

2004 novel by Martin Day

- Author: Martin Day
- Series: Doctor Who book: Eighth Doctor Adventures
- Release number: 70
- Subject: Featuring: Eighth Doctor; Fitz, Trix
- Publisher: BBC Books
- Publication date: August 2004
- Pages: 288
- ISBN: 0-563-48620-1
- Preceded by: The Tomorrow Windows
- Followed by: The Deadstone Memorial

The Sleep of Reason is a BBC Books original novel written by Martin Day and based on the long-running British science fiction television series Doctor Who. It features the Eighth Doctor, Fitz and Trix.

== Plot ==
The Doctor poses as a psychiatrist to investigate strange goings on at a mental health hospital.

== Continuity ==
- The Eighth Doctor ages about 100 years during this novel, because he travels back in time using a Sholem-Luz portal to shape events at the turn of the century, and then has to sleep in a casket in the cathedral to return to the present.
- The Doctor is always referred to as 'Smith' in this story, except by Fitz and Trix. This is a reference to the classic series, when The Doctor would sometimes call himself John Smith (a very common British name).

== Outside References ==
- The title is a take from the 1799 Francisco Goya aquatint etching "El sueno de la razon produce monstruos" ("The Sleep of Reason Produces Monsters"), part of the artist's Los Caprichos set.
