= The Domino Effect (novel) =

2003 novel by David Bishop

- Author: David Bishop
- Series: Doctor Who book: Eighth Doctor Adventures
- Release number: 62
- Subject: Featuring: Eighth Doctor; Fitz, Anji, Trix
- Publisher: BBC Books
- Publication date: February 2003
- Pages: 288
- ISBN: 0-563-53869-4
- Preceded by: The Infinity Race
- Followed by: Reckless Engineering

The Domino Effect is a BBC Books original novel written by David Bishop and based on the long-running British science fiction television series Doctor Who. It features the Eighth Doctor, Fitz, Anji and Trix.

== Plot summary ==
In 2003, Edinburgh is targeted by a series of bombings. The events are connected to London and have wider implications involving time and space. The Doctor's companions become caught up in the unfolding events, while the Doctor experiences increasingly severe chest pains.

== Reception ==
The Domino Effect won Worst Book in the 2003 Jade Pagoda Awards. Author David Bishop himself conceded that the results of the book was not what he intended and that it was not one of the best books that he has written.
