= The Infinity Race =

Doctor Who novel by Simon Messingham

- Author: Simon Messingham
- Series: Doctor Who book: Eighth Doctor Adventures
- Release number: 61
- Subject: Featuring: Eighth Doctor; Fitz and Anji
- Publisher: BBC Books
- Publication date: November 2002
- Pages: 273
- ISBN: 0-563-53863-5
- Preceded by: Time Zero
- Followed by: The Domino Effect

The Infinity Race is a BBC Books original novel written by Simon Messingham and based on the long-running British science fiction television series Doctor Who. It features the Eighth Doctor, Fitz and Anji.
