= To the Slaughter =

2005 novel by Stephen Cole

- Author: Stephen Cole
- Series: Doctor Who book: Eighth Doctor Adventures
- Release number: 72
- Subject: Featuring: Eighth Doctor; Fitz, Trix
- Publisher: BBC Books
- Publication date: February 2005
- Pages: 256
- ISBN: 0-563-48625-2
- Preceded by: The Deadstone Memorial
- Followed by: The Gallifrey Chronicles

To the Slaughter is a BBC Books original novel written by Stephen Cole and based on the long-running British science fiction television series Doctor Who. It features the Eighth Doctor, Fitz and Trix.

== Plot ==
Powerful forces are set to "spruce up: Earth's solar system, clear away "extra" items deemed unneeded, like asteroids and small moons. Naturally, there are many that protest this plan and some are willing to commit violence to meet their goals. Unknown to all are yet more dangers, set to be disturbed and angered by what is planned.

== Continuity ==
The novel provides an explanation as to why Jupiter had only twelve moons at the time of the Fourth Doctor serial Revenge of the Cybermen when, at last count, the planet has sixty-three moons. In Cole's author's note, he states that his inspiration for the book was to explain away the discrepancy.

The Doctor still cannot see the colour violet, an ability he lost in Unnatural History.
