= Lloyd Rose =

American novelist

Lloyd Rose is an American writer most associated with her work on various Doctor Who spin-offs. She has also written for the American television series Homicide: Life on the Street and Kingpin.

== Work ==
Rose was the theatre critic for The Washington Post.

She adapted the autobiographical comics stories of Harvey Pekar into a stage version of American Splendor, which was produced in 1987 at Washington, DC's Arena Stage, directed by James C. Nicola.

Rose wrote the season seven story Zen and the Art of Murder for the series Homicide: Life on the Street in 1993 and was one of the writers for the 2003 mini-series Kingpin. After becoming a fan of the Virgin New Adventures, Lloyd sent a proposal for an Eighth Doctor Adventure to BBC Books which eventually became the story The City of the Dead (BBC Books, 2001). This novel was highly regarded by both the readership and her contemporaries, and led to two further novels — Camera Obscura (BBC Books, 2002; winner of the 2002 Doctor Who Magazine Award) and The Algebra of Ice (BBC Books, 2004) — being published, the latter as part of the BBC's Past Doctor Adventures range.

Following the popular reception for her novels, Rose also wrote an audio adventure for Big Finish Productions, Caerdroia (Big Finish, November 2004).

In 2015, she adapted Alice in Wonderland for the stage.
