= Seeing I =

1998 novel by Jonathan Blum and Kate Orman

- Author: Jonathan Blum and Kate Orman
- Series: Doctor Who book: Eighth Doctor Adventures
- Release number: 12
- Subject: Featuring: Eighth Doctor; Sam
- Publisher: BBC Books
- Publication date: June 1998
- ISBN: 0-563-40586-4
- Preceded by: Dreamstone Moon
- Followed by: Placebo Effect

Seeing I is an original novel written by Jonathan Blum and Kate Orman and based on the long-running British science fiction television series Doctor Who. It features the Eighth Doctor and Sam. This book, along with a few others in the series, was reprinted in 2011.
