= Kursaal (novel) =

1998 novel by Peter Anghelides

- Author: Peter Anghelides
- Series: Doctor Who book: Eighth Doctor Adventures
- Release number: 7
- Subject: Featuring: Eighth Doctor; Sam
- Publisher: BBC Books
- Publication date: January 1998
- ISBN: 0-563-40578-3
- Preceded by: Alien Bodies
- Followed by: Option Lock

Kursaal is an original novel written by Peter Anghelides and based on the long-running British science fiction television series Doctor Who. It features the Eighth Doctor and Sam.

The word Kursaal means a public hall or room, for the use of visitors at watering places and health resorts in Germany; German kur (from Latin cūra: cure) + saal: hall, room.
