= The Gallifrey Chronicles (Parkin novel) =

2005 novel by Lance Parkin

- Author: Lance Parkin
- Series: Doctor Who book: Eighth Doctor Adventures
- Release number: 73
- Subject: Featuring: Eighth Doctor; Fitz, Trix, Anji, K-9
- Set in: Period between To the Slaughter and The Night of the Doctor
- Publisher: BBC Books
- Publication date: June 2005
- Pages: 283
- ISBN: 0-563-48624-4
- Preceded by: To the Slaughter

The Gallifrey Chronicles is a BBC Books original novel written by Lance Parkin and based on the long-running British science fiction television series Doctor Who. It was the last of the Eighth Doctor Adventures range and features the Eighth Doctor, Fitz Kreiner, and Trix MacMillan. This book, along with a few others in the series, was reprinted in 2011 and is available as an e-book.

== Plot ==
The Eighth Doctor, accompanied by Fitz Kreiner and Trix MacMillan, overthrows the tyrant Mondova on an alien world, prevents a time-travelling alien from interfering in Ancient Roman history, and stops a Dalek (never named as such, but heavily implied) invasion of Mars. Against this backdrop, Fitz and Trix have begun a relationship and decide to leave the TARDIS.

The Doctor returns to Earth in 2005, materialising at the grave of Sam Jones. When the Doctor claims not to remember his former companion, Fitz becomes angry and leaves with Trix. As the pair attempt to readjust to normal life, it is revealed that Trix has been secretly passing information gained on their travels to another former companion, Anji Kapoor, who has used the information to manipulate the stock market and thus built up a considerable fortune. The Doctor discovers that another Time Lord, Marnal, had also survived the destruction of Gallifrey, and has been living for the past hundred years as a human science-fiction writer (whose books are actually the history of the Time Lords and their homeworld). Marnal, who also claims to be the original owner of the Doctor's TARDIS, blames the Doctor for the cataclysm, and takes him and the TARDIS captive while the insectoid alien Vore invade the Earth. The Vore attack leaves millions dead or missing, including Fitz, who apparently dies trying to save Trix. After a cold fusion explosion guts the interior of the TARDIS, the Doctor discovers that K-9 Mark II has been aboard ever since Gallifrey's destruction, hidden behind a false wall, with orders from Lady President Romana of Gallifrey to kill him. However, K-9 pauses once it scans the Doctor's mind and discovers the reason why the Doctor has lost his memory.

It transpires that, just prior to destroying Gallifrey, the Doctor (with the help of his former companion Compassion) had downloaded the entire contents of the Gallifreyan Matrix – the massive computer network containing the mental traces of every Time Lord living and dead, more than 140,000 Time Lords – into his brain, with his own memories suppressed to make room for the data. Gallifrey had not actually been erased from history, but an event horizon in relative time prevented anyone from Gallifrey's past from travelling beyond Gallifrey's destruction, and vice versa. Both the planet and the Time Lords could be restored, along with the Doctor's memory, if a sufficiently sophisticated computer could be found to reconstruct them. Before that could be done, however, the problem of the Vore must be dealt with. Marnal is wounded while fighting the Vore, and being on his last regeneration, he dies. The Doctor tells him that he is his hero, and Marnal dies in peace, confident that the Time Lords will be reborn. The Doctor reveals that the Vore have not actually killed their victims, but sprayed them with a chemical that makes them invisible to humans; Fitz is still alive and the Doctor brings him back for Trix, claiming he brought the dead back to life on his first day on the job.

The Doctor, Fitz, Trix and his allies travel to Africa with a Royal Navy Battle Group to confront the threat of the Vore. The novel and the Eighth Doctor Adventures end uncertainly, as the Doctor leaps into the very heart of the Vore hive.

== Writing and development ==
This is the last novel of its series (which began with The Eight Doctors). Fear Itself (by Nick Wallace), a novel published subsequently featuring the Eighth Doctor but set before The Gallifrey Chronicles, came out as part of the Past Doctor Adventures line.

The use of the seal of Rassilon on the cover mirrors its use on the cover of the first Eighth Doctor Adventures novel, The Eight Doctors.

References are made in this novel to the Timewyrm (from the Virgin New Adventures), former companion Samantha Jones, and various events that have occurred during the course of the Eighth Doctor Adventures.

Marnal was mentioned in The Infinity Doctors and The Taking of Planet 5. One of Marnal's written works is titled "The Giants", the opening passage of "The Giants" in The Gallifrey Chronicles is identical to the prologue of Death Comes to Time. The plot of another book resembles that of The Infinity Doctors, also written by Parkin. Other unused Doctor Who story titles referenced in the book include The Witch Lords (a working title for State of Decay) and The Red Fort (a proposed First Doctor historical story commissioned from Terry Nation).

Possible threats to Gallifrey mentioned by Marnal include the Klade (Father Time), the Tractites (Genocide), Tannis (Death Comes to Time), Centro (The Infinity Doctors) and the Ongoing. Marnal gives a list of some of the Eighth Doctor's companions, including some not mentioned before: Delilah, Frank, Deborah, Jemima-Katy, Nina, and Beatrice (possibly Trix).

Larna speaks of a prophecy that, before its fall, Gallifrey will be attacked by several enemies. These include Omega (The Three Doctors), the Sontarans (The Invasion of Time), Tannis (Death Comes to Time), Varnax (from an unproduced film project), Catavolcus (the Doctor Who Magazine comic strip story The Neutron Knights, DWM #60), and the Timewyrm (Timewyrm: Revelation).

The TARDIS interior from the 1996 telemovie is destroyed by a cold fusion device, leaving the way clear for the redesigned interior seen from "The Day of the Doctor" onwards.

When Marnal is looking through the various timestreams for the Eighth Doctor, he observes that the Doctor has "three ninth incarnations" (page 62: 'As for his future. . . he has three ninth incarnations. I’ve never seen anything like it.').

At one point in the novel, Marnal mentions that he was visited by his son in the 1970s.
