= The Taint (novel) =

1999 novel by Michael Collier

- Author: Michael Collier
- Series: Doctor Who book: Eighth Doctor Adventures
- Release number: 19
- Subject: Featuring: Eighth Doctor; Sam, Fitz Kreiner
- Publisher: BBC Books
- Publication date: February 1999
- ISBN: 0-563-55568-8
- Preceded by: The Face-Eater
- Followed by: Demontage

The Taint (also called Doctor Who and the Taint) is an original novel credited to Michael Collier and based on the long-running British science fiction television series Doctor Who. The work features the Eighth Doctor and Sam. This also marks the introduction of a new companion, Fitz Kreiner.

== Writing ==
The book was written by range editor Steve Cole. Repeating the arrangement done for the earlier Longest Day, Cole asked his friend, Michael Collier, for permission to publish under his name. Collier later became an author of historical fiction in his own right.
