= Nick Walters (writer) =

British writer

Nick Walters is a British writer. He has written many spin off novels based on the BBC science fiction television series Doctor Who, as well as cowriting one featuring Bernice Summerfield.

== Work ==
=== Virgin New Adventures ===
- Dry Pilgrimage (With Paul Leonard) (1998)

=== Past Doctor Adventures ===
- Superior Beings (2001)

=== Eighth Doctor Adventures ===
- Dominion (1999)
- The Fall of Yquatine (2000)
- Reckless Engineering (2003)

=== Lethbridge-Stewart Novels ===
- Mutually Assured Domination (2015)
- The Man from Yesterday (2017)
- The Danger Men (2018)
- Legacy of the Dominator (2022)

=== UNIT Novels ===
- The Secret of Foxfell Forest (2025)
