= The Turing Test (novel) =

2000 novel by Paul Leonard

- Author: Paul Leonard
- Series: Doctor Who book: Eighth Doctor Adventures
- Release number: 39
- Subject: Featuring: Eighth Doctor
- Publisher: BBC Books
- Publication date: October 2000
- Pages: 242
- ISBN: 0-563-53806-6
- Preceded by: Casualties of War
- Followed by: Endgame

The Turing Test is a BBC Books original novel written by Paul Leonard and based on the long-running British science fiction television series Doctor Who. It features the Eighth Doctor.

The story is in three parts, written as if it is by three historical figures: the mathematician Alan Turing, and the novelists Graham Greene and Joseph Heller respectively.
