= Doctor Who: The Ninth Doctor Adventures =

Audio play series

The Ninth Doctor Adventures

Big Finish Productions audio drama
- Series: Doctor Who
- Featuring: Ninth Doctor
- Executive producers: Jason Haigh-Ellery; Nicholas Briggs
- Release date: May 2021 – present

The Ninth Doctor Adventures, announced in August 2020, is a Big Finish Productions audio play series based on the television series Doctor Who. It sees the return of Christopher Eccleston reprising his role as the Ninth Doctor and will span four boxsets comprising an entire audio season that was released between May 2021 and February 2022. A second audio season of four more boxsets followed in 2022 and 2023. A third audio season of four followed in 2023 and 2024.

== History ==
The Ninth Doctor, as portrayed by actor Christopher Eccleston, first appeared in 2005 for the relaunch of Doctor Who. Eccleston is notable for portraying The Doctor for one series before departing. Since, Eccleston had vowed never to return to the science fiction series, even declining to portray the character in the fiftieth anniversary special "The Day of the Doctor" due to his feelings that the story "didn't do the character any justice" and felt the BBC still owed him an apology.

In 2018 the actor stated about his exit, “What happened around Doctor Who almost destroyed my career... I gave them a hit show and I left with dignity and then they put me on a blacklist. I was carrying my own insecurities as it was something I had never done before and then I was abandoned, vilified in the tabloid press and blacklisted.”

As of August 2020, Eccleston, having felt healed from meeting fans at conventions and their feelings towards his portrayal of The Doctor, ultimately agreed to participate with Big Finish after discussions with Big Finish co-chairman, Jason Haigh-Ellery. Eccleston, in response to his return, stated “After 15 years, it will be exciting to revisit the Ninth Doctor’s world, bringing back to life a character I love playing.”

A second season was announced on 13 September 2021. Subsequently, a third season was announced on 9 March 2023, while a fourth series featuring his series one companion Rose Tyler was announced in 2025.

== Production ==
Nicholas Briggs revealed that he would direct some episodes of the series and that other directors would also be involved. He also revealed he has written a story but was not sure if the BBC would accept it. Christopher Eccleston posted a picture on Instagram showing him holding the script, which revealed title of the first episode, Sphere of Freedom, and writer Nicholas Briggs.

== Cast ==
=== Main cast ===
List indicator

This section includes characters who will appear or have appeared in at least one season.

- A green cell indicates the actor is a main cast member.
- A red cell indicates the actor is a recurring cast member.
- A light blue cell indicates the actor is a guest or special guest cast member.

Actor	Character	Appearances				
Actor	Character	S1	S2	S3	S4	Special
Christopher Eccleston	The Doctor	✓	✓	✓	✓	✓
Alex Kingston	River Song			✓		
Billie Piper	Rose Tyler				✓	
Carole Ann Ford	Susan Foreman					✓
Camilla Beeput	Nova	✓				
Jayne McKenna	Audrey	✓				
Nicholas Briggs	Cybermen	✓				
Nicholas Briggs	Sea Devils		✓			
Nicholas Briggs	Zzargol			✓		
Jon Culshaw	Brigadier Lethbridge-Stewart	✓				
Warren Brown	Sam Bishop	✓				
Elinor Lawless	Fiona McCall	✓				
Camille Coduri	Jackie Tyler				✓	
Adam Martyn	Callen Lennox		✓	✓		
Harki Bhambra	Doyle		✓	✓		

=== Guests ===
==== Series 1 ====
- Ben Lee as Farraday (Sphere Of Freedom / Cataclysm / Food Fight)
- Jamie Parker as Halloran (Sphere Of Freedom / Cataclysm / Food Fight)
- Dan Starkey as Marcus Aurelius Gallius (Sphere Of Freedom / Cataclysm / Food Fight)
- Claire Corbett as Ravager (Cataclysm / Food Fight)
- Anjella MacKintosh as AI / President / Café Owner (Cataclysm / Food Fight)
- Pearl Appleby as DC Jana Lee (Girl, Deconstructed)
- Mirren Mack as Marnie / The Serapheem (Girl, Deconstructed)
- Forbes Masson as Kurt (Girl, Deconstructed)
- Damian Lynch as Artie Berger (Fright Motif)
- Gemma Whelan as Zazie Vincent (Fright Motif)
- Adrian Schiller as Maurice Le Bon (Fright Motif)
- Jan Francis as First Incorporation (Planet of the End)
- Nick Fletcher as Second Incorporation (Planet of the End)
- Annette Badland as Mrs Goose / Fleshkin 3 (The Hunting Season)
- Don Gilét as Streatham / Fleshkin 2 (The Hunting Season)
- Alex Jennings as Lord Hawthorn (The Hunting Season)
- Anthony Howell as Macbeth / Siward (The Curse of Lady Macbeth)
- Neve McIntosh as Gruach (The Curse of Lady Macbeth)
- David Rintoul as Kinade / Priest / Bishop (The Curse of Lady Macbeth)
- Peter Bankolé as Dieter Jovanovic (Monsters In Metropolis)
- Nick Wilton as Fritz Lang (Monsters In Metropolis)
- Helen Goldwyn as Anna Dreyfus (Monsters In Metropolis)
- Raj Ghatak as Olaf Richter (Monsters In Metropolis)
- Sienna Guillory as Idara Beckett (Fond Farewell)
- Juliet Stevenson as Winifred Whitby (Fond Farewell)

==== Series 2 ====
- Indigo Griffths as Saffron Windrose (Station to Station)
- Ian Bartholemew as The Grimminy-Grue (Station to Station)
- Katy Brittain as Oksana Vladmirovna Kuznetsova (The False Dimitry)
- Leah Brotherhead as Mandy Litherland (Auld Lang Syne)
- Wendy Craig as Great Aunt Bette (Auld Lang Syne)
- Hayley Tamaddon as Auntie Sue (Auld Lang Syne)
- Dan Starkey as Sontarans (Salvation Nine)
- Josie Lawrence as Gaznak (Salvation Nine)
- Pooja Shah as Navarch Al-Hanin (Salvation Nine)
- Nicolas Colicos as Succeeding / Robot (Last of the Zetacene)
- Alice Feetham as Nel (Last of the Zetacene)
- Maureen O'Brien as Selo / First Gyra (Last of the Zetacene)
- Simon Shepherd as Pal Andrews (Break the Ice)
- Thalissa Teixeira as Dr Lenni Fisk (Break the Ice)
- Pip Torrens as Kenton (Break the Ice)
- Sasha Behar as Diana Hendry (The Seas Of Titan)
- Yasmin Mwanza as Rachel Bates / Taroth (The Seas Of Titan)
- Ferdy Roberts as Soloman Read (The Seas Of Titan)
- Joseph Kloska as Ludwig Von Husseldorf (Lay Down Your Arms)
- Jamie Parker as Tsar Alexander II / Trinity (Lay Down Your Arms)
- Diana Quick as Sophie Kinzky (Lay Down Your Arms)
- Kate Sissons as Bertha Kinzky (Lay Down Your Arms)
- Nicola Walker as Liv Chenka (Flatpack)
- Rebecca Root as Tania Bell (Flatpack)
- Jeremy Swift as Fraser / Colleague One (Flatpack)
- Frank Skinner as Pete Snow (The Colour of Terror)
- Dinita Gohil as Sahdna Chand / Marla (The Colour of Terror)
- Dave Hearn as Toby Entwhistle (The Blooming Menace)

==== Series 3 ====
- Louise Jameson as Flarca (The Green Gift)
- Ian Conningham as Fridtjof Nansen (Northern Lights)
- Gerard Kearns as Hjalmar Johansen (Northern Lights)
- Rachel Fenwick as Daphne (The Beautiful Game)
- Kelly Adams as Vyx Leeson (Below There)
- Jane Goddard as Alpha Centauri (Run)
- Jane Asher as Bellatrix Vega (Run)
- Alexander Vlahos as Antonin Artaud (A Theatre of Cruelty)
- Elisabeth Yorke-Bolognini as Beatrice Cenci (A Theatre of Cruelty)
- Fiona Wade as Sergeant Ambika Desai (The Running Men)
- Lisa Bowerman as Bernice Summerfield (Ancient History)

== Episodes ==
=== Series 1 (2021–22) ===
No.	Title	Directed by	Written by	Featuring	Released
Volume 1: Ravagers
1	"Sphere of Freedom"	Nicholas Briggs	Nicholas Briggs	Ninth Doctor, Nova, Audrey	May 2021
2	"Cataclysm"	Nicholas Briggs	Nicholas Briggs	Ninth Doctor, Nova, Audrey	May 2021
3	"Food Fight"	Nicholas Briggs	Nicholas Briggs	Ninth Doctor, Nova, Audrey	May 2021
Volume 2: Respond to All Calls
4	"Girl, Deconstructed"	Helen Goldwyn	Lisa McMullin	Ninth Doctor, Marnie, Kurt, Serapheem	August 2021
5	"Fright Motif"	Helen Goldwyn	Tim Foley	Ninth Doctor, Artie Berger, Zazie Vincent, Maurice Le Bon	August 2021
6	"Planet of the End"	Helen Goldwyn	Timothy X Atack	Ninth Doctor, First Incorporation	August 2021
Volume 3: Lost Warriors
7	"The Hunting Season"	Barnaby Edwards	James Kettle	Ninth Doctor	November 2021
8	"The Curse of Lady Macbeth"	Barnaby Edwards	Lizzie Hopley	Ninth Doctor	November 2021
9	"Monsters in Metropolis"	Barnaby Edwards	John Dorney	Ninth Doctor, Fritz Lang, Cybermen	November 2021
Volume 4: Old Friends
10	"Fond Farewell"	Helen Goldwyn	David K Barnes	Ninth Doctor	February 2022
11	"Way of the Burryman"	Helen Goldwyn	Roy Gill	Ninth Doctor, Brigadier Lethbridge-Stewart, Sam Bishop, Fiona McCall, Cybermen	February 2022
12	"The Forth Generation"	Helen Goldwyn	Roy Gill	Ninth Doctor, The Brigadier, Sam, Fiona, Cybermen	February 2022

=== Series 2 (2022–23) ===
No.	Title	Directed by	Written by	Featuring	Released
Volume 1: Back to Earth
1	"Station to Station"	Helen Goldwyn	Robert Valentine	Ninth Doctor, Saffron Windrose	May 2022
2	"The False Dimitry"	Helen Goldwyn	Sarah Grochala	Ninth Doctor	May 2022
3	"Auld Lang Syne"	Helen Goldwyn	Tim Foley	Ninth Doctor, Mandy Litherland	May 2022
Volume 2: Into the Stars
4	"Salvation Nine"	Helen Goldwyn	Timothy X Atack	Ninth Doctor, Sontarans	August 2022
5	"Last of the Zetacene"	Helen Goldwyn	James Kettle	Ninth Doctor	August 2022
6	"Break the Ice"	Helen Goldwyn	Tim Foley	Ninth Doctor, Jack Frost	August 2022
Volume 3: Hidden Depths
7	"The Seas of Titan"	Ken Bentley	Lizbeth Myles	Ninth Doctor, Sea Devils	November 2022
8	"Lay Down Your Arms"	Ken Bentley	Lisa McMullin	Ninth Doctor, Bertha Kinzky	November 2022
9	"Flatpack"	Ken Bentley	John Dorney	Ninth Doctor, Liv Chenka, Tania Bell	November 2022
Volume 4: Shades of Fear
10	"The Colour of Terror"	Helen Goldwyn	Lizzie Hopley	Ninth Doctor	February 2023
11	"The Blooming Menace"	Helen Goldwyn	James Kettle	Ninth Doctor	February 2023
12	"Red Darkness"	Helen Goldwyn	Roy Gill	Ninth Doctor, Callen Lennox, Doyle, Vashta Nerada	February 2023

=== Series 3 (2023–24) ===
No.	Title	Directed by	Written by	Featuring	Released
Volume 1: Pioneers
1	"The Green Gift"	Helen Goldwyn	Roy Gill	Ninth Doctor, Callen, Doyle, Giant Maggots	May 2023
2	"Northern Lights"	Helen Goldwyn	Robert Valentine	Ninth Doctor, Fridtjof Nansen, Hjalmar Johansen	May 2023
3	"The Beautiful Game"	Helen Goldwyn	Katharine Armitage	Ninth Doctor, Daphne	May 2023
Volume 2: Travel in Hope
4	"Below There"	Helen Goldwyn	Lauren Mooney and Stewart Pringle	Ninth Doctor, Vyx Leeson	August 2023
5	"The Butler Did It"	Helen Goldwyn	James Moran	Ninth Doctor	August 2023
6	"Run"	Helen Goldwyn	Robert Valentine	Ninth Doctor, Zzargol, Alpha Centauri	August 2023
Volume 3: Buried Threats
7	"A Theatre of Cruelty"	Helen Goldwyn	Lisa McMullin	Ninth Doctor, Antonin Artaud, Beatrice Cenci	February 2024
8	"The Running Men"	Helen Goldwyn	Mark Wright	Ninth Doctor, Ambika Desai	February 2024
9	"Ancient History"	Helen Goldwyn	Matt Fitton	Ninth Doctor, Bernice Summerfield	February 2024
Volume 4: Star-Crossed
10	"Swipe Right"	Helen Goldwyn	John Dorney	Ninth Doctor, River Song	May 2024
11	"Face of the Apocalypse"	Helen Goldwyn	Lizzie Hopley	Ninth Doctor, River Song	May 2024
12	"Archipelago"	Helen Goldwyn	Tim Foley	Ninth Doctor, River Song	May 2024

=== Series 4 ===
No.	Title	Directed by	Written by	Featuring	Released
1	"Snare"	Helen Goldwyn	Tim Foley	Ninth Doctor, Rose Tyler, Jackie Tyler	August 2025
2	"The Last Days of the Powell Estate"	Helen Goldwyn	Timothy X Atack	Ninth Doctor, Rose, Jackie	October 2025
3	"Dare You"	Helen Goldwyn	Lisa McMullin	Ninth Doctor, Rose, Jackie	December 2025
4	"Cloud Eight"	Helen Goldwyn	Lauren Mooney and Stewart Pringle	Ninth Doctor, Rose	February 2026
5	"Pandemonium"	Helen Goldwyn	Katharine Armitage	Ninth Doctor, Rose, Jackie, Samuel Pepys	April 2026
6	"Thirteen O'Clock"	Helen Goldwyn	Robert Valentine	Ninth Doctor, Rose, Saffron Windrose	June 2026
7	"Dark Tides"	Helen Goldwyn	Tim Foley	Ninth Doctor, Rose	August 2026
8	"False Friends"	Helen Goldwyn	Timothy X Atack	Ninth Doctor, Rose, Autons	October 2026
9	"The Rag Man"	Helen Goldwyn	Lauren Mooney and Stewart Pringle	Ninth Doctor, Rose, Jackie	December 2026
10	TBA	Helen Goldwyn	N/A	Ninth Doctor, Rose	February 2027
11	TBA	Helen Goldwyn	N/A	Ninth Doctor, Rose	April 2027
12	TBA	Helen Goldwyn	N/A	Ninth Doctor, Rose	June 2027

=== Special (2026) ===
No.	Title	Directed by	Written by	Featuring	Released
–	"The Wash"	Helen Goldwyn	Robert Valentine	Ninth Doctor, Susan Foreman	December 2026

== Awards and nominations ==
Name of the award ceremony, year presented, category, nominee(s) of the award, and the result of the nomination
Award ceremony	Year	Category	Work(s)	Result	Ref.
BBC Audio Drama Awards	2023	Best Podcast Audio Drama	The Ninth Doctor Adventures	Shortlisted	
Scribe Awards	2022	Best Audio	The Curse of Lady Macbeth	Won	
Scribe Awards	2022	Best Audio	Girl, Deconstructed	Nominated	
Scribe Awards	2022	Best Audio	Monsters in Metropolis	Nominated	
