= Legacy of the Daleks =

1998 novel by John Peel

- Author: John Peel
- Series: Doctor Who book: Eighth Doctor Adventures
- Release number: 10
- Subject: Featuring: Eighth Doctor; Susan
- Publisher: BBC Books
- Publication date: April 1998
- ISBN: 0-563-40574-0
- Preceded by: Longest Day
- Followed by: Dreamstone Moon

Legacy of the Daleks is an original novel written by John Peel and based on the long-running British science fiction television series Doctor Who. It features the Eighth Doctor, Susan, the Master - as the Roger Delgado incarnation - and the Daleks.

== Outside references ==
Susan calls the Master a "troll".
