= Superior Beings =

2001 novel by Nick Walters

- Author: Nick Walters
- Series: Doctor Who book: Past Doctor Adventures
- Release number: 43
- Subject: Featuring: Fifth Doctor; Peri
- Set in: Period between Planet of Fire and The Caves of Androzani
- Publisher: BBC Books
- Publication date: June 2001
- Pages: 280
- ISBN: 0-563-53830-9
- Preceded by: Asylum
- Followed by: Byzantium!

Superior Beings is a BBC Books original novel written by Nick Walters and based on the long-running British science fiction television series Doctor Who. It features the Fifth Doctor and Peri.

== Plot synopsis ==
Peri hasn't been traveling with the Doctor for long and is charmed by the exciting life he leads. This soon turns to terror as a pleasure planet the pair visits turns out to be the domain of hunters who enjoy the taste of human flesh.

That's not even the worst of the secrets the place holds.
