= Eighth Doctor Adventures =

Doctor Who novels

The Eighth Doctor Adventures
- Author: Various
- Country: United Kingdom
- Language: English
- Discipline: Science fiction
- Publisher: BBC Books
- Published: 1997–2005
- Media type: Print
- No. of books: 73

The Eighth Doctor Adventures (sometimes abbreviated as EDA or referred to as the EDAs) are a series of spin off novels based on the long running BBC science fiction television series Doctor Who and published under the BBC Books imprint. 73 books were published overall.

== Publication history ==
Between 1991 and 1997, Virgin Publishing had been producing a successful series of spin off novels under the New Adventures and Missing Adventures ranges. However, following the Doctor Who television movie which introduced the Eighth Doctor in 1996, the BBC did not renew Virgin Publishing's license to continue publishing Doctor Who material, instead opting to publish their own range. Virgin's last New Adventures novel, The Dying Days by Lance Parkin, featured the Eighth Doctor.

The Eighth Doctor Adventures began in 1997 with The Eight Doctors by Terrance Dicks and continued until 2005. These novels all feature the Eighth Doctor, as portrayed in the 1996 television movie by Paul McGann. It is unclear if the BBC line was originally intended to be a continuation of the continuity established in the New Adventures. However, as many of the writers for the Eighth Doctor Adventures had also written for the Virgin series, many elements from the New Adventures began to appear in both the EDAs and the Past Doctor Adventures (which replaced the Missing Adventures), and such continuity has been broadly maintained.

Virgin had distinguished the New and Missing Adventures with different cover designs. BBC Books, however, did not differentiate their novels featuring the current and past Doctors in this way, although they were listed separately within the books. Fans continued to distinguish the ongoing story of the Eighth Doctor from the more stand-alone adventures of past Doctors, although some plot elements did cross over both ranges.

With the revival of the television series, BBC Books ceased the regular Eighth Doctor Adventures in favour of a new range (the New Series Adventures), featuring characters from the new series. One further novel featuring the Eighth Doctor (Fear Itself) was published under the Past Doctor Adventures line before it too ceased publication.

In addition to the Eighth Doctor Adventures and the Past Doctor Adventures, the BBC also published three short story collections under the title of Short Trips which feature all eight (at the time of publication) Doctors. These were also inherited from Virgin, a version of their Decalog short story collections, and when the BBC ceased publishing them, a licence to continue was sought by Big Finish Productions, who published some for a while. They now continue to publish their own range of Short Trips collections as audios.

=== Crossover ===
In 2018, officially licensed elements of the series were used in a crossover story with the 10,000 Dawns series, titled White Canvas, alongside elements of Faction Paradox. This was later published in print form in the anthology, 10,000 Dawns: The Outer Universe Collection.

== List of Eighth Doctor Adventures ==
#	Title	Author	Featuring	Published
1	The Eight Doctors	Terrance Dicks	Sam, cameos from many others	June 1997
2	Vampire Science	Kate Orman and Jonathan Blum	Sam	July 1997
3	The Bodysnatchers	Mark Morris	Sam	August 1997
4	Genocide	Paul Leonard	Sam, Jo Grant, UNIT	September 1997
5	War of the Daleks	John Peel	Sam	October 1997
6	Alien Bodies	Lawrence Miles	Sam	November 1997
7	Kursaal	Peter Anghelides	Sam	January 1998
8	Option Lock	Justin Richards	Sam	February 1998
9	Longest Day	Michael Collier	Sam	March 1998
10	Legacy of the Daleks	John Peel	Susan	April 1998
11	Dreamstone Moon	Paul Leonard	None	May 1998
12	Seeing I	Kate Orman and Jonathan Blum	Sam	June 1998
13	Placebo Effect	Gary Russell	Sam, Stacy, Ssard	July 1998
14	Vanderdeken's Children	Christopher Bulis	Sam	August 1998
15	The Scarlet Empress	Paul Magrs	Sam, Iris Wildthyme	September 1998
16	The Janus Conjunction	Trevor Baxendale	Sam	October 1998
17	Beltempest	Jim Mortimore	Sam	November 1998
18	The Face-Eater	Simon Messingham	Sam	January 1999
19	The Taint (also called Doctor Who and the Taint)	Michael Collier	Sam, Fitz	February 1999
20	Demontage	Justin Richards	Sam, Fitz	March 1999
21	Revolution Man	Paul Leonard	Sam, Fitz	April 1999
22	Dominion	Nick Walters	Sam, Fitz	May 1999
23	Unnatural History	Kate Orman and Jonathan Blum	Sam, Fitz	June 1999
24	Autumn Mist	David A. McIntee	Sam, Fitz	July 1999
25	Interference – Book One: Shock Tactic	Lawrence Miles	Sam, Fitz, Compassion; the Third Doctor, Sarah Jane and K-9	August 1999
26	Interference – Book Two: The Hour of the Geek	Lawrence Miles	Sam, Fitz, Compassion; the Third Doctor, Sarah Jane and K-9	August 1999
27	The Blue Angel	Paul Magrs and Jeremy Hoad	Fitz, Compassion, Iris Wildthyme	September 1999
28	The Taking of Planet 5	Simon Bucher-Jones and Mark Clapham	Fitz, Compassion	October 1999
29	Frontier Worlds	Peter Anghelides	Fitz, Compassion	November 1999
30	Parallel 59	Stephen Cole and Natalie Dallaire	Fitz, Compassion	January 2000
31	The Shadows of Avalon	Paul Cornell	Fitz, Compassion, Brigadier Lethbridge-Stewart, Romana III	February 2000
32	The Fall of Yquatine	Nick Walters	Fitz, Compassion	March 2000
33	Coldheart	Trevor Baxendale	Fitz, Compassion	April 2000
34	The Space Age	Steve Lyons	Fitz, Compassion	May 2000
35	The Banquo Legacy	Andy Lane and Justin Richards	Fitz, Compassion	June 2000
36	The Ancestor Cell	Peter Anghelides and Stephen Cole	Fitz, Compassion, Romana III	July 2000
37	The Burning	Justin Richards	none	August 2000
38	Casualties of War	Steve Emmerson	none	September 2000
39	The Turing Test	Paul Leonard	none	October 2000
40	Endgame	Terrance Dicks	none	November 2000
41	Father Time	Lance Parkin	Debbie Castle, Miranda	January 2001
42	Escape Velocity	Colin Brake	Fitz, Anji Kapoor	February 2001
43	EarthWorld	Jacqueline Rayner	Fitz, Anji Kapoor	March 2001
44	Vanishing Point	Stephen Cole	Fitz, Anji Kapoor	April 2001
45	Eater of Wasps	Trevor Baxendale	Fitz, Anji Kapoor	May 2001
46	The Year of Intelligent Tigers	Kate Orman	Fitz, Anji Kapoor	June 2001
47	The Slow Empire	Dave Stone	Fitz, Anji Sabbath (cameo)	July 2001
48	Dark Progeny	Steve Emmerson	Fitz, Anji	August 2001
49	The City of the Dead	Lloyd Rose	Fitz, Anji	September 2001
50	Grimm Reality	Simon Bucher-Jones and Kelly Hale	Fitz, Anji	October 2001
51	The Adventuress of Henrietta Street	Lawrence Miles	Fitz, Anji, Sabbath	November 2001
52	Mad Dogs and Englishmen	Paul Magrs	Fitz, Anji, Iris Wildthyme	January 2002
53	Hope	Mark Clapham	Fitz, Anji	February 2002
54	Anachrophobia	Jonathan Morris	Fitz, Anji, Sabbath	March 2002
55	Trading Futures	Lance Parkin	Fitz, Anji	April 2002
56	The Book of the Still	Paul Ebbs	Fitz, Anji	May 2002
57	The Crooked World	Steve Lyons	Fitz, Anji	June 2002
58	History 101	Mags L Halliday	Fitz, Anji, Sabbath	July 2002
59	Camera Obscura	Lloyd Rose	Fitz, Anji, Sabbath, George Williamson	August 2002
60	Time Zero	Justin Richards	Fitz, Anji, Trix, Sabbath, George Williamson	September 2002
61	The Infinity Race	Simon Messingham	Fitz, Anji, Sabbath	November 2002
62	The Domino Effect	David Bishop	Fitz, Anji, Trix, Sabbath	February 2003
63	Reckless Engineering	Nick Walters	Fitz, Anji, Trix, Sabbath	April 2003
64	The Last Resort	Paul Leonard	Fitz, Anji, Trix, Sabbath	June 2003
65	Timeless	Stephen Cole	Fitz, Anji, Trix, Sabbath	August 2003
66	Emotional Chemistry	Simon A. Forward	Fitz, Trix	October 2003
67	Sometime Never...	Justin Richards	Fitz, Trix, Miranda, Sabbath	January 2004
68	Halflife	Mark Michalowski	Fitz, Trix	April 2004
69	The Tomorrow Windows	Jonathan Morris	Fitz, Trix	June 2004
70	The Sleep of Reason	Martin Day	Fitz, Trix	August 2004
71	The Deadstone Memorial	Trevor Baxendale	Fitz, Trix	October 2004
72	To the Slaughter	Stephen Cole	Fitz, Trix	January 2005
73	The Gallifrey Chronicles	Lance Parkin	Fitz and Trix with cameos by Compassion, Anji, Miranda, Romana III and K-9	June 2005

== Plot overview ==
Following the events of the 1996 Doctor Who television movie, the Eighth Doctor picks up a British teenager from 1997, Samantha "Sam" Jones, and later a disaffected drifter in his late twenties named Fitz Kreiner from 1963. During their adventures, the threesome tangle with the Faction Paradox, a renegade voodoo cult of time travellers who believed in creating time paradoxes and altering history. They also meet the Doctor's old friend Iris Wildthyme, a Time Lady from Gallifrey who travels in a TARDIS shaped like a London double-decker bus.

When Sam leaves the TARDIS, the Doctor and Fitz are joined by Compassion, a member of a once-human race called the Remote who slowly begins a conversion process into a living TARDIS. The Time Lords, led by his old companion Romana, now President of the High Council, anxious to get their hands on this new TARDIS technology, pursue the Doctor, who loses his own TARDIS and continues to travel using Compassion. The conflict with Faction Paradox comes to a climax on Gallifrey, where the Doctor discovers his TARDIS in orbit around the planet, transformed into a giant structure of living bone by the Faction. The Doctor, faced with an impossible decision, destroys the Faction and causes major damage to the timeline by apparently wiping his homeworld and his people from history.

Much later, it is revealed that four Time Lords had survived the catastrophe: The Doctor, the Master, Iris Wildthyme and Marnal.

Meanwhile, having rescued the Doctor from near-death, Compassion leaves the now-amnesiac Doctor on Earth in the late 19th century while she drops Fitz off in 2001 to await the long process of the Doctor's — and the now-embryonic TARDIS's — recovery. She then departs for parts unknown. The Doctor spends the next hundred years travelling the world and living through its history, eventually adopting Miranda, a young girl with two hearts. Miranda leaves the Doctor to face her own destiny in the far future, and the Doctor goes on to meet Fitz as arranged, thanks to a note Compassion slipped into his pocket a century before. Following that, the two are joined by Anji Kapoor, a London stock trader and the three leave Earth in the TARDIS.

Much later, while on Earth in the eighteenth century, the Doctor, Fitz and Anji encounter Sabbath, a Secret Service operative who is aware of time travel and becomes the Doctor's personal nemesis. The Doctor loses his second heart, which was slowly killing him as it was his only link to his now-forgotten homeworld. Sabbath takes the heart and implants it in his own body, tying him and the Doctor together. Through several more adventures, the Doctor and his companions encounter Sabbath again and Trix MacMillan stows away aboard the TARDIS.

Sabbath subsequently loses the Doctor's time-sensitive heart and the Doctor grows a new one. The Doctor also begins to recover fragments of his memory, and discovers that Sabbath is working for a group called the Council of Eight. The Council wants to collapse the alternate timelines of the multiverse into one, manageable timeline. To them, the Doctor is a rogue element that needs to be controlled or eliminated. They also begin to eliminate his previous companions from time. Trix comes out of hiding, joining the crew, and Anji leaves the TARDIS. Sabbath eventually realises that the council is not human and turns on his masters. Miranda, now a grown woman with a daughter, also returns to help her adopted father defeat the council, but both she and Sabbath die in the process.

Eventually, the Doctor returns to Earth in 2005 and discovers that another Time Lord, Marnal, has also survived the destruction of Gallifrey. Marnal, who also claims to be the original owner of the Doctor's TARDIS, blames the Doctor for the cataclysm, and takes him and the TARDIS captive while the insectoid alien Vore invade the Earth. After a cold fusion explosion guts the interior of the TARDIS, the Doctor discovers that K-9 Mark II had been aboard all along, with orders from Lady President Romana of Gallifrey to kill him. However, K-9 pauses once it scans the Doctor's mind and discovers the reason why the Doctor has lost his memory.

Just prior to destroying Gallifrey, the Doctor (with Compassion's help) downloaded the contents of the Gallifreyan Matrix — the massive computer network containing the mental traces of every Time Lord living and dead — into his brain, with his own memories suppressed to make room for the data. Gallifrey had not actually been erased from history, but an event horizon in relative time prevented anyone from Gallifrey's past to travel beyond Gallifrey's destruction, and vice versa. Both the planet and the Time Lords can be restored, along with the Doctor's memory, if a sufficiently sophisticated computer could be found to reconstruct them. Before that can be done, however, there is the problem of the Vore to contend with.

At novel's end, the Doctor, Trix and Fitz are set to confront the Vore invasion force. The restoration of Gallifrey, in time for its second destruction in the Time War prior to the events of the 2005 series has yet to be chronicled.

The Eighth Doctor Adventures line ends with The Gallifrey Chronicles. Although one further novel featuring the Eighth Doctor (Fear Itself by Nick Wallace) was published under the Past Doctor Adventures line before BBC Books decided to retire the PDAs as well, that book takes place prior to Timeless. It remains to be seen if the events of The Gallifrey Chronicles will be followed up by any future novel.

== Companions ==
The Doctor has a series of new companions, who never appeared in the television programme. They are:

- Samantha "Sam" Jones – from The Eight Doctors to Interference.
- Fitzgerald Michael "Fitz" Kreiner – from The Taint to The Gallifrey Chronicles.
- Compassion – Interference to The Ancestor Cell.
- Miranda – Father Time and The Gallifrey Chronicles.
- Anji Kapoor – Escape Velocity to Timeless.
- Beatrix "Trix" MacMillan – Timeless to The Gallifrey Chronicles.

== Recurring characters ==
- Sabbath first appears in The Adventuress of Henrietta Street.
- Iris Wildthyme, a Time Lady appears in The Scarlet Empress, The Blue Angel and Mad Dogs and Englishmen.
- Members of Faction Paradox, a time-travelling voodoo cult founded by renegade Time Lords (no individual members of the cult appear more than once).

== See also ==
- List of Doctor Who novelists
