= Endgame (novel) =

2000 novel by Terrance Dicks

- Author: Terrance Dicks
- Series: Doctor Who book: Eighth Doctor Adventures
- Release number: 40
- Subject: Featuring: Eighth Doctor
- Publisher: BBC Books
- Publication date: November 2000
- Pages: 288
- ISBN: 0-563-53822-8
- Preceded by: The Turing Test
- Followed by: Father Time

Endgame is a BBC Books original novel written by Terrance Dicks and based on the long-running British science fiction television series Doctor Who. It features the Eighth Doctor, as well as the Players.
