= Timeless (Cole novel) =

Doctor Who novel by Stephen Cole

- Author: Stephen Cole
- Series: Doctor Who book: Eighth Doctor Adventures
- Release number: 65
- Subject: Featuring: Eighth Doctor; Fitz, Anji, Trix
- Publisher: BBC Books
- Publication date: August 2003
- Pages: 288
- ISBN: 0-563-48607-4
- Preceded by: The Last Resort
- Followed by: Emotional Chemistry

Timeless is a BBC Books original novel written by Stephen Cole and based on the long-running British science fiction television series Doctor Who. It features the Eighth Doctor, Fitz, Anji and Trix.

== Plot ==
The Doctor takes a huge risk to restore the collapsing multiverse.
