= Companion (Doctor Who) =

TV series characters

Notable companions of the Doctor, as introduced into the series in chronological order, left to right from top row: Susan Foreman, the Doctor's first companion and granddaughter; 18th-century Scotsman Jamie McCrimmon; lab assistant Jo Grant; journalist Sarah Jane Smith; K9, the first robotic companion; Adric, the first regular companion to be killed off; Tegan Jovanka, the first companion played by a non-British actor; Rose Tyler, the first companion of the revived series; Martha Jones, the first non-white full-time companion; schoolteacher Clara Oswald; Bill Potts, the first openly gay companion; Yasmin Khan, the first British Asian companion. Jamie, Jo, Sarah Jane, Tegan, Clara and Yasmin are among the Doctor's longest-serving on-screen companions.

In the BBC science fiction television series Doctor Who, a "companion" is a character who regularly travels and shares adventures with the series' central character, the alien time traveller known as the Doctor. Typically, a companion encounters the Doctor by chance and is subsequently invited to join them in adventures through time and space. The companion serves as the series' co-lead for the duration of their tenure, and often acts as an audience surrogate by mirroring the viewers' unfamiliarity with science fiction settings and concepts.

When Doctor Who began airing in 1963, companions Ian Chesterton (William Russell) and Barbara Wright (Jacqueline Hill) were the series's primary protagonists, whereas the Doctor served as an elusive but important supporting character. After Russell and Hill left the series, this dynamic was maintained through a succession of new companions—often originating from different eras of history—who filled their roles of a heroic male and an inquisitive young woman. The format changed in 1970 when actor Jon Pertwee introduced an action-oriented "leading man" interpretation of the Doctor which eliminated the need for a male companion. As Pertwee's Doctor was exiled to Earth, his companions were predominantly young women from contemporary England, which became standard in the series going forward. The Doctor has nevertheless continued to travel with male, historical and non-human companions.

As Doctor Who holds a prominent position in British pop culture, the Doctor's companions have attracted attention from critics and the media. Their characterisation has often reflected changing attitudes towards the depiction of women on screen. Early female companions have been criticised for being mere damsels in distress, while later companions have been praised for their independence and agency. From the 1990s onward, the series increasingly focused on their personal lives and family. Following a controversial kiss between the Doctor and companion Grace Holloway in the 1996 Doctor Who television film, the series has depicted occasional romances between the Doctor and their companions. The cultural backgrounds of the companions have become more diverse over time, with the introduction of the series' first non-white full-time companion (Martha Jones; 2007) and the first openly gay companion (Bill Potts; 2017). The Doctor's companions Jack Harkness, Sarah Jane Smith and K9 each feature as the lead character in the licensed spin-off television series Torchwood (2006–2011), The Sarah Jane Adventures (2007–2011) and K9 (2009–2010) respectively.

The term "companion" is applied to these characters by the Doctor Who production team and appears in the BBC's promotional material, but is not typically used within the series' narrative. The Doctor has also referred to these characters as "friends" or "assistants"; the British press have also used the latter term. Critics differ on whether recurring characters who infrequently travel with the Doctor, such as Brigadier Lethbridge-Stewart, Jack Harkness and River Song, are considered companions.

== Development ==
Doctor Who is a long-running British science-fiction television series that began in 1963. It stars its protagonist, The Doctor, an alien who travels through time and space in a ship known as the TARDIS, as well as their travelling companions. When the Doctor dies, they can undergo a process known as "regeneration", completely changing the Doctor's appearance and personality. Throughout their travels, the Doctor often comes into conflict with various alien species and antagonists.

Although the term "companion" is commonly used by the BBC and other media to refer to characters who travel with the Doctor, there is no strict definition of the term. Characters who have travelled with the Doctor infrequently or on a single occasion, such as Jackie Tyler, Astrid Peth and Christina de Souza, are generally not considered companions. It is debated whether Sara Kingdom (Jean Marsh), who only travelled with the Doctor in The Daleks' Master Plan (1965-66), should be listed as a companion. Stephen Brook of The Guardian noted that the definition became less clear in the revived series due to the greater presence of recurring characters who infrequently travel with the Doctor and the inclusion of the lead cast members' names in the programme's opening title sequence.

=== 1960s ===
Co-creator of Doctor Who, Sydney Newman, envisioned the regular cast comprising a senile male time traveller (the Doctor, played by William Hartnell) with a teenage girl companion for younger viewers to relate to (Susan Foreman, played by Carole Ann Ford), who are joined by a couple between whom romance could develop (Susan's schoolteachers Ian Chesterton and Barbara Wright, played by William Russell and Jacqueline Hill respectively). The Doctor was intended to be enigmatic with uncertain motives, with Ian in the more conventional "action hero" role. Writer Anthony Coburn decided to make Susan the Doctor's granddaughter to avoid the inappropriate implications of an older man travelling with an unrelated teenage girl. As Ian and Barbara were therefore the only regular characters to originate from present-day Earth, they provided the audiences' point of view in stories set in Earth's history and on alien worlds. Their reactions to the Doctor's adventures and mysterious behaviour reflected the audiences' own experience of the programme.

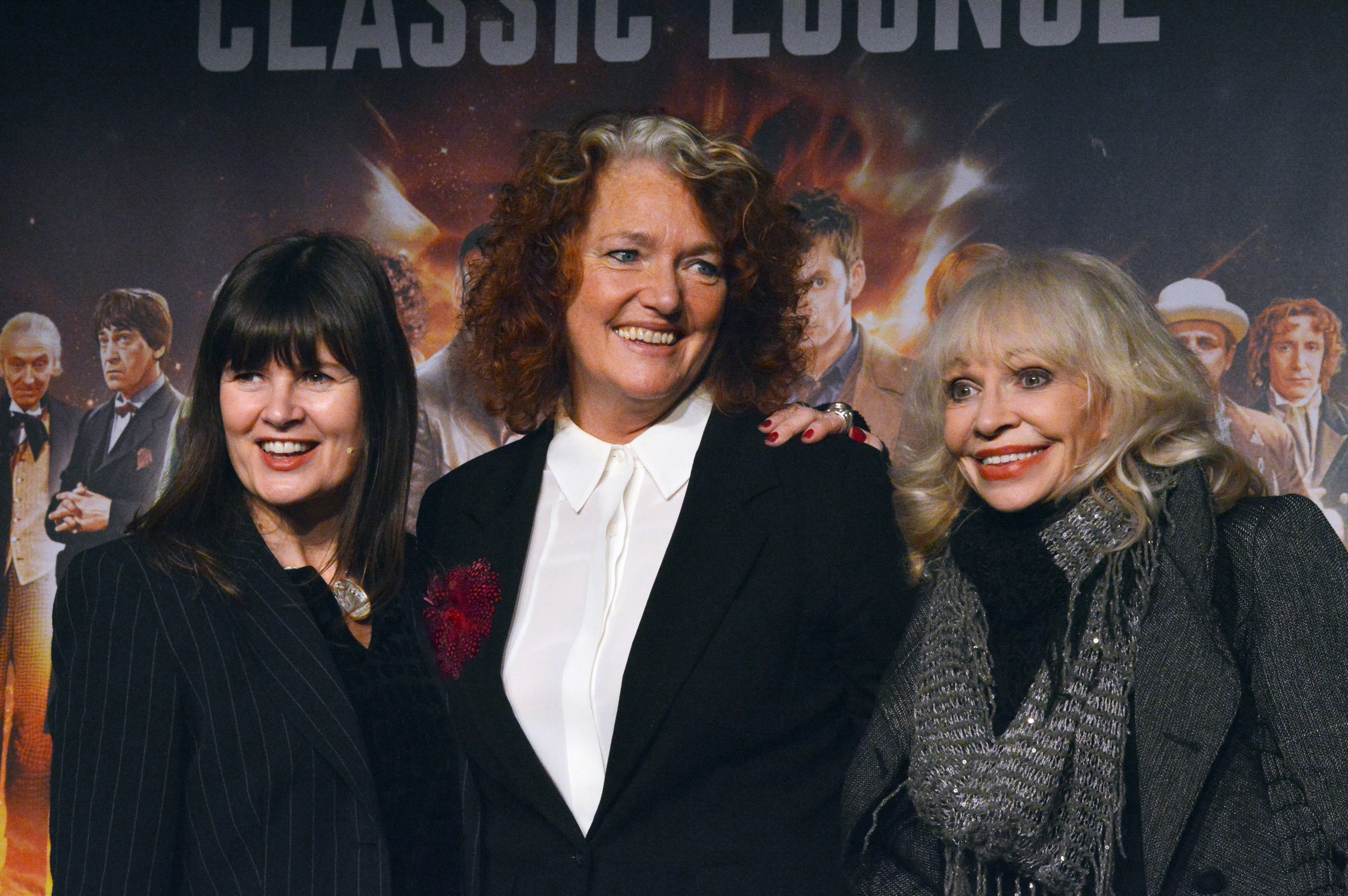
From left: Sophie Aldred, Louise Jameson and Katy Manning played companions in three different eras of the series.

Ford departed the programme in The Dalek Invasion of Earth (1964). In the following serial, The Rescue (1965), the young orphan Vicki (Maureen O'Brien) is introduced as a new companion for the Doctor, preserving the programme's established balance of characters. Russell and Hill left the series in The Chase (1965) which left only the Doctor from the programme's original line-up. Ian and Barbara's narrative role was filled by the introduction of astronaut Steven Taylor (Peter Purves). These characters largely served as narrative replacements for departing companions, and none of them stayed for a long enough measure of time to develop as their own characters.

By the time of the show's third season from 1965-1966, more contemporary companions were introduced in the form of Ben and Polly (Michael Craze and Anneke Wills), who did not fulfill pre-existing narrative roles. The fourth season introduced the character Jamie McCrimmon (Frazer Hines) who stayed largely through the entire run of Patrick Troughton's Second Doctor. Jamie served as a point of identification for young audiences due to the character's "naive, childlike curiosity", while also appealing to adolescent audiences due to his acts of courage. The show's female characters, however, were often brought on the show for purposes of physical attraction; character Victoria Waterfield (Deborah Watling) routinely wore short skirts while Zoe Heriot (Wendy Padbury) often wore catsuits. These costume choices were seen as an attempt to reflect the youth-oriented culture of the Swinging Sixties.

=== 1970s ===
The series' format drastically changed in 1970. The Third Doctor (Jon Pertwee) was exiled to present-day Earth by the Time Lords and allied to the military organisation UNIT which resulted in a focus on Earth-bound stories rather than space adventures. Pertwee's Doctor was more of a "man of action" than his predecessors, which eliminated the need for a male companion. Companions during Pertwee's time on the show tended to be female as a result, and from this point the Doctor primarily had only one companion. Liz Shaw (Caroline John) was the first companion of this era. She subverted stereotypes by being highly intelligence and rational, unlike prior companions who fell into the role of a "screamer". However, the companion role, by this point, served a narrative role in which companions "ask the questions that allow the Doctor to show off his superior knowledge and intellectual prowess". This led to Shaw being written out of the show after only one season, after which she was succeeded by Jo Grant (Katy Manning).

Grant reverted back to old stereotypes previous companions had followed, and her "engaging personality and 'kooky' sex appeal" led to her staying on the show for three seasons and become one of the show's most popular companions. Grant was followed by Sarah Jane Smith (Elisabeth Sladen), who, like Shaw, was an "intelligent, assertive woman", being much more overtly feminist, with the character's journalistic background allowing the character to express her intellect through an inquisitive nature. Sarah Jane became one of the show's most popular companions, and is seen as the show's attempt at coming to terms with the women's liberation movement in the United Kingdom. During this time, due to the lack of male companions, this role was filled by several recurring supporting cast members from UNIT.

The early era of the Fourth Doctor (Tom Baker) carried over many aspects from Pertwee's time on the show, though slowly transitioned out of them. Due to uncertainty over the Fourth Doctor's casting, Harry Sullivan (Ian Marter) was introduced to fulfill any necessary physical roles in case the Doctor's actor was an older man; Sullivan was written out of the series by the end of his first season due to Baker being able to fulfill the necessary physicality. Sarah Jane continued to serve as a companion, with Sladen crediting the change in actor playing the Doctor to have allowed her greater freedom in the part as a character. Though popular due to Sladen's chemistry with Baker, her feminist edge lessened as her character began to fall back into the "screamer" stereotypes of past companions as Baker's run progressed.

Sarah Jane was followed by Leela (Louise Jameson), who, while being portrayed as a strong, independent character, wore a leather bikini intended to appeal to a male viewing audience. Before Leela's introduction was the 1976 serial The Deadly Assassin, the first in the series to lack a companion, which was done due to both the production team wanting to try a companion-less story, but also to prove to Baker, who doubted the need for a companion, that the series needed a consistent point of audience identification. Baker was reticent to the idea of having another companion after Sladen's departure, and thus treated Jameson coldly behind the scenes, though later apologized to her when the pair reunited decades later to work on audio dramas together.

Following Leela, and serving as the companion for the show's sixteenth season, which had one interconnected plot, was Romana (Mary Tamm), who was also a Time Lord like the Doctor. Romana was highly intelligent and possessed an "aristocratic" demeanour, which contrasted with Baker's more aloof Doctor, though her character proved to suffer from similar problems to Shaw in that her intellect meant that there was little reason for the Doctor to explain anything to her. Tamm felt her character had begun to rely on similar tropes to past female companions, and thus departed after one season. When Tamm departed, her character regenerated, and Lalla Ward took over playing the character. In contrast to Tamm, Ward's incarnation, dubbed Romana II, shares more personality traits with Baker's Doctor, though still retained traits of Tamm's incarnation. Ward sought to diversify her portrayal of the character, as she did not feel it was right to play the role exactly as Tamm had. As Doctor Who began to transition to a more comedic story style during the late 1970s, the character K9 (John Leeson), a robot dog, was introduced. The character appealed strongly to children, and thus remained a major cast member for three seasons. The character was portrayed by David Brierly during the show's seventeenth season,.

=== 1980s and 1990s ===
Adric (Matthew Waterhouse) was introduced during the eighteenth season. Waterhouse had a rocky relationship with his co-stars, and members of production were hesitant on the idea of introducing a young man in the cast; they later agreed it didn't work to their intentions. Romana and K9 were written out shortly after Adric's introduction. Baker's time on the show ended with the Fourth Doctor having three companions: Adric, Nyssa (Sarah Sutton), and Tegan Jovanka (Janet Fielding). Nathan-Turner had initially wanted Sarah Jane or Leela to return to ease the transition between the Fourth and Fifth Doctor (Peter Davison), but both Sladen and Jameson declined to return. Tegan was thus introduced in their stead to capitalise on the show's growing Australian audience. Tegan was made an unwilling traveller, echoing Ian and Barbara, who were similarly initially brought on the Doctor's travels against their own will.

By the start of the Fifth Doctor's era, it was decided that Adric should be written out to make the main cast less crowded, with Adric killed off toward the start of Davison's time on the show. Tegan was written out of the series soon afterward, though swiftly brought back the following season. Davison's era also introduced Vislor Turlough (Mark Strickson) and Kamelion (Gerald Flood). Turlough was introduced due to the production team liking the idea of having a companion aboard the TARDIS who sought to kill the Doctor, though both Strickson and the production team agreed that the plotline did not sustain itself well over the season. Kamelion, unlike other companions, was not portrayed by a physical actor but rather an animatronic prop. The prop was so difficult to use that Kamelion, following his introduction story, was not seen again until Davison's penultimate story, where Kamelion was destroyed. Davison's era also saw the return of several past companions. In 1981, Sarah Jane and K9 were brought back for the spin-off pilot K-9 and Company, and while it emerged to strong viewing figures, it was ultimately not picked up for a full series. The 1983 anniversary special "The Five Doctors" saw the return of Susan, Sarah Jane, K9, Romana II, Jamie, Zoe, Liz, and members of UNIT's supporting cast.

The final companion introduced in Davison's era was Peri Brown (Nicola Bryant). Peri, who was an American, represented Doctor Who's growing popularity in America during the 1980s, though her physical appearance was also an attempt to appeal to male viewers, which was criticised by female viewers of the time. Peri was retained as a companion for Davison's successor, the Sixth Doctor (Colin Baker), with stories in Baker's era focusing on Peri having to come to terms with the shift in the Doctor's personality. Baker's era saw the character greatly mistreating Peri, including a scene in the Sixth Doctor's first story where he attacks her soon after regenerating. Though her second season with Baker saw a kinder dynamic between the two, Bryant decided to leave the show by this point, and requested that it be "dramatic," leading to Nathan-Turner electing to kill Peri, resulting in her death in 1986's Mindwarp. Her death was later undone after Nathan-Turner decided it was a mistake to kill her, resulting in Peri being later revealed in The Ultimate Foe (1986) to have instead married a supporting character, which surprised Bryant.

Mel Bush (Bonnie Langford) was introduced as a companion of the Sixth Doctor following the death of Peri. She served as the first companion of the Seventh Doctor (Sylvester McCoy)'s time on the show, and she fell into the usual "screamer" archetype of past companions. Many criticised the character for doing little else, and Mel was written out of the show in the same episode that introduced the subsequent companion, Ace (Sophie Aldred). Ace represented a notable shift from prior Doctor Who companions, being "a streetwise teenager with a trouble past and something of an attitude problem". Ace represented a more contemporary companion, particularly appealing to "the disaffected and disenfranchised portion of British society that the series had generally overlooked", and unlike prior companions, Ace was given room to grow as a character, with the Doctor serving as a mentor figure for her. Ace's character arc was cut short, however, as the show ended up being cancelled in 1989. The period following the show's 1989 cancellation has been dubbed "the Wilderness Years" by fans.

Throughout the 1990s and early 2000s, in lieu of televised stories, Doctor Who spin-off media was produced, which included novels, audio dramas, and comic strips. These stories introduced a number of unique characters and creations based upon the series, though the canonicity of this material to televised media is unclear. Material created includes the spin-off series Gallifrey, a series focused on political struggles amongst the Time Lords which starred Romana II and Leela as main characters, with K9 featured as a supporting character. One major character introduced during the 1990s is Bernice Summerfield, an archaeologist from Earth's future. Summerfield was a major character in Virgin Books's Doctor Who novels and highly popular, and after the Virgin lost the license to produce Doctor Who content, Summerfield was given her own spin-off independent of the series. Big Finish Productions later produced audio dramas featuring the character. Her success was credited with helping to establish independent spin-off series for supporting characters such as Gallifrey. Another notable companion introduced through spin-off media was Izzy Sinclair, a comic book geek who became the franchise's first gay companion.

=== 2000s ===
Following a failed revival in 1996, Doctor Who was revived in 2005. Rose Tyler (Billie Piper), was introduced alongside Christopher Eccleston's Ninth Doctor as the first Doctor and companion pairing of the revival. Rose, introduced before the Doctor in the revival, serves as a point of identification for audiences, and the narrative follows her as its main character more than the Doctor at first. Rose took multiple successful elements previously pioneered by Ace, being "sassy, streetwise, and fashion-conscious", and her performance allowed her to appeal to female viewers, particularly through her more contemporary nature. Alongside Rose was a "social context" for Rose which involved a contemporary setting featuring her mother, Jackie Tyler (Camille Coduri) and boyfriend Mickey Smith (Noel Clarke), introducing a "soap opera" element which defined much of the revival's presentation. This element was important for showing Rose's life outside of travelling with the Doctor, and in the show's first season focused a lot on her relationship with her mother and growing estrangement with Mickey.

The Tenth Doctor (David Tennant) succeeded the Ninth, and his dynamic with Rose changed as the pair became romantically involved. During this time, companion departures became more emotionally involved, serving as emotional climaxes of a given season, most notably through Rose's departure, in which she and the Doctor are separated across universes. Subsequent companions of the Tenth Doctor, Martha Jones (Freema Agyeman) and Donna Noble (Catherine Tate) followed tropes established by Rose, such as having strong home lives and a focus on their character journeys throughout their time with the Doctor.

The series also received two spin-offs during this period which focused on some of its companion characters: Torchwood (2006-2011) and The Sarah Jane Adventures (2007-2011). Torchwood stars Jack Harkness, who the production team wanted to explore in greater depth, and focuses on a more adult audience than Doctor Who, while The Sarah Jane Adventures focuses on Sarah Jane, who had previously returned to Doctor Who in the 2006 episode "School Reunion" along with K9, and focuses on a child audience.

=== 2010s ===
Matt Smith's Eleventh Doctor succeeded Tennant in the role of the Doctor. The Eleventh Doctor's first companion is Amy Pond (Karen Gillan), who, though originally believed she and the Doctor would be romantically involved as was the case with Rose, is engaged to the character Rory Williams (Arthur Darvill), and the pair end up traveling together with the Doctor. Smith's Doctor does, however, end up engaging in a romantic relationship with the character River Song (Alex Kingston), who had been introduced as a supporting character under Tennant's tenure and serves in a recurring role during Smith's time on the show as a love interest, portrayed as being his wife from the future. A plot twist, part of the era's overarching story arcs, also reveal that she is Amy and Rory's daughter.

== Characterisation ==
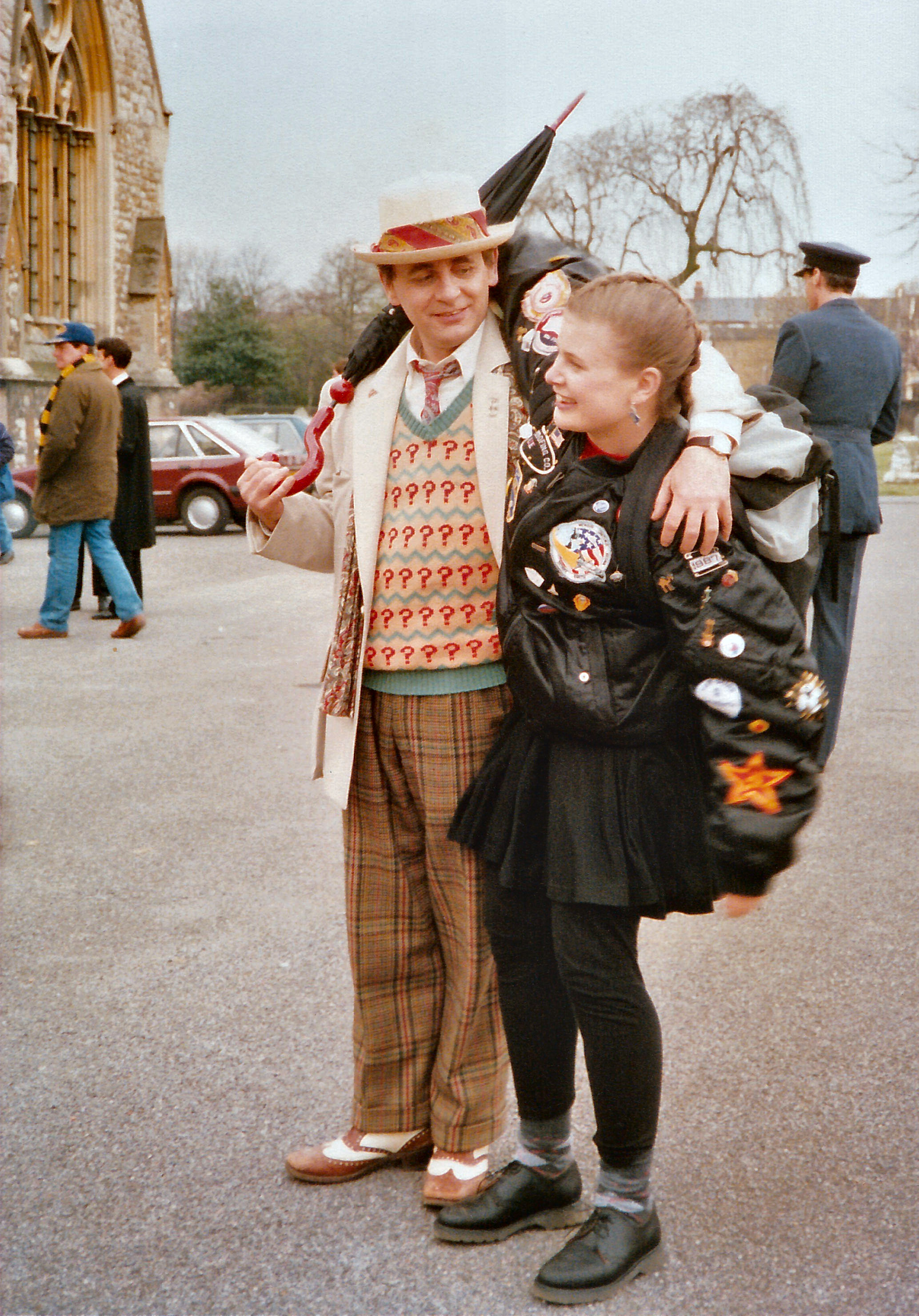
The Seventh Doctor and his companion Ace, played by Sylvester McCoy and Sophie Aldred respectively

=== Narrative role ===
The Doctor's companions have assumed a variety of roles—involuntary passengers, assistants (particularly Liz Shaw), friends, and fellow adventurers; and, of course, he regularly gains new companions and loses old ones. Sometimes they return home, and sometimes they find new causes—or loves—on worlds they have visited. Some companions have taken trips in the TARDIS by accident like Tegan Jovanka. The Doctor's companions tend to be optimistic and resilient.

Companions generally travel in the TARDIS with the Doctor for more than one adventure. Sometimes a guest character takes a role in the story similar to that of a companion, such as photographer Isobel Watkins, who plays a significant role in The Invasion (1968), or Lynda Moss in "Bad Wolf" and "The Parting of the Ways" (2005). In the revived era, some guest characters have gained companion status such as Mickey Smith, River Song, Wilfred Mott, and Craig Owens.

Terrance Dicks, one of the show's script editors in the 1970s, felt that companions only served to function as a plot device, and that viewers were uninterested in action not involving the Doctor or a monster, and thus did not seek to develop them in great depth. Steven Moffat described the term "companion" as "old-fashioned", stating: "the companion is kind of the main character... it's an opportunity to start the show all over again with somebody else meeting the Doctor and bringing out a different side of him.. The role of a companion in Doctor Who is not a supporting role, it's a co-lead." Moffat has noted that the introduction of a companion has enabled the show to somewhat begin again, with the same concepts being reintroduced through the companion's eyes.

An attempt was made in 1974 to reintroduce a male companion alongside the Doctor and his female companion, returning the series to the dynamic it had seen in the 1960s. Harry Sullivan (Ian Marter) was introduced as it was envisaged that the Fourth Doctor would be played by an older actor who would have difficulty with stunts. However, 40-year-old Tom Baker proved adequate in this regard, so Harry was written out after one season. Additionally, producer Philip Hinchcliffe wanted to pare the cast back to two characters so that it "didn't feel that your hero was dragging a gang of helpers". He also felt that "there wasn't really room in my view, where we were taking the show, for two permanent companions." In The Invisible Enemy (1977), the Doctor acquired his first robotic companion, the robot dog K9 (voiced by John Leeson).

In 1980, producer John Nathan-Turner re-established the dynamic of the Doctor with three companions: Adric (Matthew Waterhouse), Tegan (Janet Fielding) and Nyssa (Sarah Sutton). By the time of the Sixth Doctor in 1985, a single companion had become standard again.

When the series returned in 2005, a single female companion remained the standard format, though intermittent and short-term companions also featured. More consistent exceptions occurred between series 5 and 7, when the Eleventh Doctor travelled with Amy Pond and Rory Williams, and series 10, where the Twelfth Doctor appeared alongside Bill Potts and Nardole. In conjunction with the introduction of the first female Doctor in 2018, the Thirteenth Doctor's era features multiple companions (both male and female) throughout, whilst both the Fourteenth and Fifteenth Doctor predominantly travel with a single companion.

=== Personal lives ===
Companions' friends and families were rarely depicted in the classic era of Doctor Who, and most classic-era companions were orphans. Victoria Waterfield (Deborah Watling) is somewhat of an exception as she joins the Doctor in The Evil of the Daleks (1967) after her father is killed off. With Sydney Newman's original conception of the First Doctor (William Hartnell) as a "senile old man", the Doctor served as a surrogate father or grandfather figure to his companions. In the 2020 essay Doctor Who, Family and National Identity, Danny Nicol argued that early Doctor Who was influenced by 1960s children's literature "in which the disappearance of parents was treated as a prerequisite to the attainment of adventure." In the early 1980s, Doctor Who began to tentatively depict the companions' family. The absent parents of Ace (Sophie Aldred), the final companion of the classic series, maintain an ominous presence throughout her tenure. According to Matthew Jones in a 1995 article for Doctor Who Magazine, "For the first time since the Sixties, stories began to revolve around the companion, focusing on Ace's origins, loves and fears." In The Curse of Fenric (1989), Ace's encounter with an infant version of her mother resolves her hostility towards her parents. Nicol notes the significance "that one of classic Who’s most emotionally charged encounters with family occurred almost at the end of the programme's run."

When showrunner Russell T Davies was developing the first companion of the revived series (2005), Rose Tyler (Billie Piper), he felt it was necessary to examine the unavoidable questions of "do her family miss her?" and "has she gone missing?". Davies created Rose's mother Jackie Tyler (Camille Coduri) and boyfriend Mickey Smith (Noel Clarke), whose presence provided a narrative structure where Rose would frequently return home them in order to make her "real" and to "give her a life". Davies's tenure of the programme ushered in a new status quo where the domestic life of the Doctor's companions was frequently explored. Many family members of the revived series' companions have gone on to travel with the Doctor, such as Mickey, Donna Noble (Catherine Tate)'s grandfather Wilfred Mott (Bernard Cribbins) and Amy Pond (Karen Gillan)'s fiancé Rory Williams (Arthur Darvill). In series 8 (2014), showrunner Steven Moffat explored the impact that travelling with the Doctor has on the home life of companion Clara Oswald (Jenna Coleman), with her boyfriend Danny Pink (Samuel Anderson) positioned in contrast to the Twelfth Doctor (Peter Capaldi). Moffat's tenure of the programme also saw the Doctor more closely involved in his companions' lives. The backstories of Amy Pond, River Song and Clara Oswald are closely tied to the Doctor.

=== Romance ===
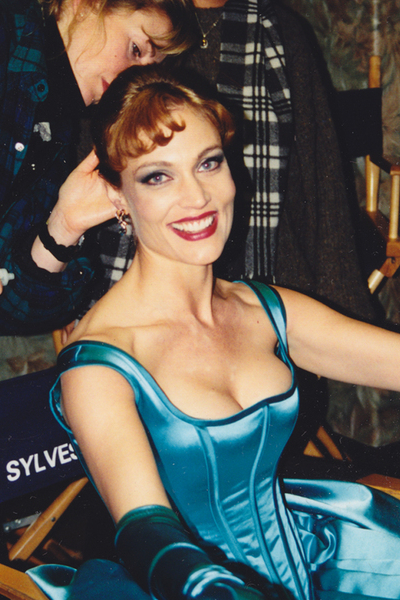
Grace Holloway (Daphne Ashbrook) was the first companion to kiss the Doctor, a creative decision considered controversial by fans.

Although the majority of his companions have been single women, romance between the Doctor and his companions was non-existent in the classic era of Doctor Who. Romantic storylines did not occur between companions, although companions Ian Chesterton and Barbara Wright were envisioned with the opportunity of such a storyline arising. Lewis Knight and Louise Griffin of the Radio Times noted that companion Romana II (Lalla Ward)'s close relationship with the Fourth Doctor (Tom Baker) verges on romantic, reflecting Baker and Ward's real-life relationship and marriage. In the 1980s, Doctor Who producer John Nathan-Turner famously insisted "There's no hanky-panky in the TARDIS". Despite casting 29-year-old Peter Davison as the Fifth Doctor (then the youngest actor to play the role), who was a comparable age to Janet Fielding, who played companion Tegan Jovanka, Nathan-Turner forbid the Doctor from putting his arm around Tegan or Nyssa (Sarah Sutton) on screen to avoid creating romantic tension between the characters. Davison felt that this decision made it difficult for writers to make the companions "more rounded".

In the 1996 television film Doctor Who, intended as a backdoor pilot for a new American-produced series, the Eighth Doctor (Paul McGann) kisses his new companion Grace Holloway (Daphne Ashbrook). The Doctor's first on-screen kiss was received negatively by fans. However, this was a precursor to the revived series where Doctor-companion romance was depicted more regularly. Davies stated in 2004: "If we can think of the perfect story for [the Doctor] to fall in love then he will... The purists may be up in arms." Throughout series 2 (2006), the Tenth Doctor and Rose develop a celibate romantic connection, the first between the Doctor and a companion. In the following series (2007), Martha Jones (Freema Agyeman)'s character arc focuses on her unreciprocated romantic feelings for the Doctor.

Doctor-companion romance was further explored with the Eleventh Doctor (Matt Smith). He rejects the advances of his companion Amy Pond (Karen Gillan), but forms a romantic connection with occasional companion River Song and ultimately marries her in "The Wedding of River Song" (2011). Clara's relationship with the Eleventh Doctor has been described as "flirtatious", though this was toned down when Capaldi succeeded Smith as the Twelfth Doctor. The Thirteenth Doctor (Jodie Whittaker)'s romantic arc with companion Yasmin Khan (Mandip Gill) marked the first same-sex romance between the Doctor and a companion.

In 2014, Dan Martin of The Guardian noted that Doctor-companion romances have "been a device designed to allow for hugely awkward comedic moments, and the advances rarely ever come the Doctor himself." In 2022, Molly Moss of the Radio Times noted that the few Doctor-companion romances of the programme have usually been depicted as celibate or unrequited.

=== Demographics ===
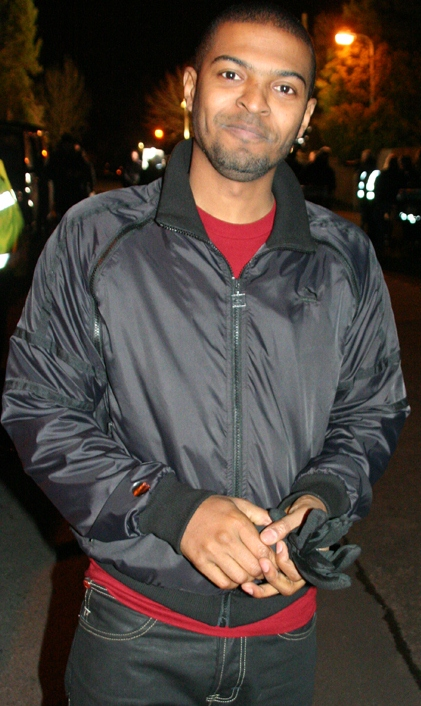
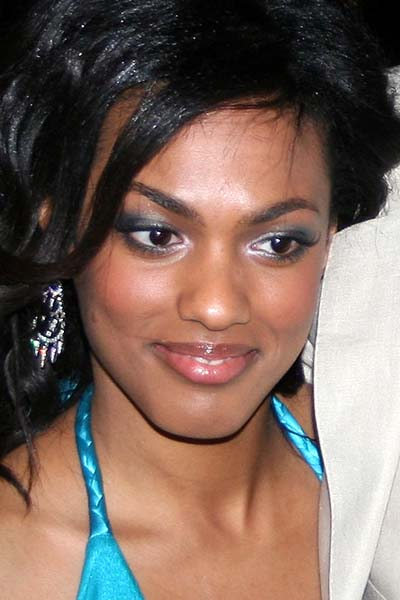
Mickey Smith (Noel Clarke) was the first non-white character to travel with the Doctor; Martha Jones (Freema Agyeman) is the Doctor's first full-time non-white companion.

The demographic of the Doctor's companions has expanded over Doctor Who's history. While the classic series predominantly featured white, middle-class British companions (and those originating from outer space were typically coded as British), later companions have increasingly represented different cultural backgrounds, nationalities and classes. Cockney sailor Ben Jackson (Michael Craze), introduced in The War Machines (1966), was the Doctor's first working-class companion. After Ace's introduction in Dragonfire (1987), companions from working-class households became increasingly common.

In the early 1980s, John Nathan-Turner introduced two contemporary companions of non-British nationality to break with convention: Australian flight attendant Tegan Jovanka, played by Australian actress Janet Fielding, and American botany student Peri Brown, played by British actress Nicola Bryant. Tegan was the first companion played by a non-British actor.

Every companion in the classic series was white. Media publications have described Martha Jones, who debuted in series 3 (2007), as the Doctor's first non-white companion (Note: "Doctor Who is to be joined by his first black companion in the show's 43-year history. Freema Agyeman will star as the Doctor's new sidekick, Martha Jones..." "[Agyeman] will be the first ethnic minority companion in the 43-year television history of Doctor Who..." "Martha Jones wasn't the first black person to travel in the TARDIS, but she was the first full time companion..." "Because Mickey's time with the Doctor was relatively short, Martha is often credited as being the first non-white companion on the series.") despite Mickey Smith (Noel Clarke)'s short time travelling with the Doctor in the previous series. Yasmin Khan (Mandip Gill), introduced in "The Woman Who Fell to Earth" (2018), is the Doctor's first companion of Asian heritage. With the introduction of British Asian companion Belinda Chandra (Varada Sethu) in 2025, she and black actor Ncuti Gatwa as the Fifteenth Doctor make up the first wholly non-white TARDIS team.

LGBT companions have also been introduced to the programme. Writer Rona Munro intended for "lesbian subtext" to be present between Ace and the supporting character Karra in Survival (1989), but admitted that this was unclear. The "omnisexual" con man Jack Harkness (John Barrowman), who intermittently travelled with the Doctor after his introduction in "The Empty Child" (2005), was the first openly non-heterosexual character in Doctor Who. Companion Clara Oswald, introduced in 2012, has been interpreted as bisexual by critics. Lesbian canteen assistant Bill Potts (Pearl Mackie), introduced in "The Pilot" (2017), is considered the first openly gay companion. Classic-era companions have been retroactively established as LGBT in licensed spin-off media, such as Tegan and Nyssa.

Robotic companions such as K9 and Kamelion, voiced by John Leeson / David Brierly and Gerald Flood respectively, have also been introduced.

=== Impact on the Doctor ===
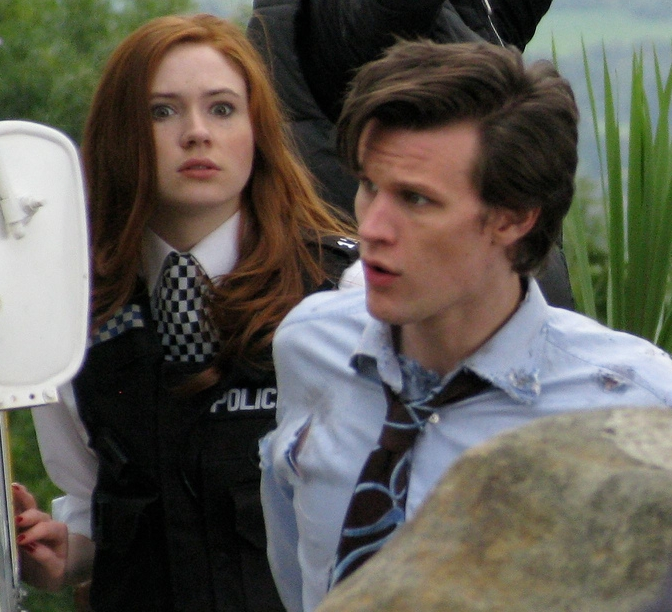
The Eleventh Doctor (Matt Smith) with companion Amy Pond (Karen Gillan), who was killed off in the 2012 episode "The Angels Take Manhattan"; the impact of this on the Doctor was explored in "The Snowmen" (2012).

In the original run of the show, companions were mostly written as leaving of their own accord, with only a few exceptions. The first death of a regular companion was of Adric in the 1982 serial Earthshock. This is different in the revived era, with companions more often given tragic endings and the show exploring the theme of loss more. Demaris Oxman makes further distinction of the way this theme is explored by different showrunners, arguing that companions in Steven Moffat's time as showrunner tended to have more tragic endings, while Russell T. Davies wrote departures closely tied to each companion's character.

The impact of such losses has been explored within the show. For example, the loss of Amy and Rory Williams drives the Eleventh Doctor into solitude in Victorian London where he refuses to get involved in the world's affairs anymore. Series 9 dealt with the Twelfth Doctor's growing fear over the potential of losing Clara Oswald. (Note: Expressed in "The Witch's Familiar", "Before the Flood", "The Girl Who Died", "The Woman Who Lived", and "The Zygon Inversion") Her death in "Face the Raven" leads the Doctor to undertake extreme measures to undo her fate, as depicted in the Series 9 finale "Hell Bent". The impact of the death of his wife, River Song, is a subplot of both "The Husbands of River Song" and "The Return of Doctor Mysterio". Steven Moffat, showrunner from 2010 to 2017, has stated that companion deaths are "wrong for Doctor Who", explaining that he does not believe the show should represent the "grittiness" of real life. In the classic series, the Doctor did not keep in touch with former companions, and companions rarely returned to the show after departing the TARDIS.

== List of companions on television ==
The "last serial" column only includes the last serial in which they appeared in a companion role and excludes minor roles, cameos, flashbacks, and so forth. Also, the table refers solely to adventures with the respective Doctor. Some companions who appear with two or more Doctors appear in separate tables.

=== First Doctor ===
Companion	Actor	Seasons	First serial	Last serial
Susan Foreman	Carole Ann Ford	1, 2, 1983 special	An Unearthly Child (Note: Susan travelled with the Doctor prior to the events of An Unearthly Child.)	"The Five Doctors" (Note: Susan leaves the Doctor in The Dalek Invasion of Earth, before returning in "The Five Doctors" as companion to the First Doctor (then played by Richard Hurndall). She later appears in "The Interstellar Song Contest".)
Barbara Wright	Jacqueline Hill	1, 2	An Unearthly Child	The Chase
Ian Chesterton	William Russell	1, 2	An Unearthly Child	The Chase (Note: Also makes a cameo appearance in "The Power of the Doctor")
Vicki	Maureen O'Brien	2, 3	The Rescue	The Myth Makers
Steven Taylor	Peter Purves	2, 3	The Chase	The Savages
Katarina	Adrienne Hill	3	The Myth Makers	The Daleks' Master Plan
Sara Kingdom (Note: The inclusion of Sara Kingdom as a companion varies. She does not appear on the BBC website list of companions, but is listed as a companion in many other sources.)	Jean Marsh	3	The Daleks' Master Plan	
Dodo Chaplet	Jackie Lane	3	The Ark (Note: Also appears in The Massacre)	The War Machines
Polly	Anneke Wills	3, 4	The War Machines	The Tenth Planet (Note: Polly and Ben continue travelling with the Doctor following his regeneration in The Tenth Planet.)
Ben Jackson	Michael Craze	3, 4	The War Machines	The Tenth Planet

=== Second Doctor ===
Companion	Actor	Seasons	First serial	Last serial
Polly	Anneke Wills	4	The Power of the Daleks	The Faceless Ones
Ben Jackson	Michael Craze	4	The Power of the Daleks	The Faceless Ones
Jamie McCrimmon	Frazer Hines (Note: Jamie is played by Hamish Wilson in parts of The Mind Robber episodes 2 and 3, while Frazer Hines was suffering from chickenpox.)	4, 5, 6, 22	The Highlanders	The Two Doctors (Note: Jamie returns to his own time in The War Games, but later appears in the Sixth Doctor-era story The Two Doctors, again as the Second Doctor's companion.) (Note: Also makes a cameo appearance in "The Five Doctors")
Victoria Waterfield	Deborah Watling	4, 5	The Evil of the Daleks	Fury from the Deep
Zoe Heriot	Wendy Padbury	5, 6	The Wheel in Space	The War Games
Brigadier Lethbridge-Stewart	Nicholas Courtney	1983 special	"The Five Doctors" (Note: First appears in The Web of Fear (as Colonel) and The Invasion alongside the Second Doctor, before appearing as a semi-regular character throughout the Third Doctor's era. He further appears in Robot and Terror of the Zygons alongside the Fourth Doctor, and Mawdryn Undead alongside the Fifth Doctor before serving as the Second Doctor's companion in "The Five Doctors". He subsequently appears in the Seventh Doctor's Story Battlefield and The Sarah Jane Adventures story Enemy of the Bane.)	

=== Third Doctor ===
The final three listed characters, all associated with UNIT during the Third Doctor's exile to Earth, are sometimes considered his companions despite appearing irregularly during his tenure.

Companion	Actor	Seasons	First serial	Last serial
Liz Shaw	Caroline John	7	Spearhead from Space	Inferno
Jo Grant	Katy Manning	8, 9, 10	Terror of the Autons	The Green Death (Note: Jo also appears in The Sarah Jane Adventures story Death of the Doctor (2010), alongside Sarah Jane Smith and the Eleventh Doctor.)
Sarah Jane Smith	Elisabeth Sladen	11, 1983 special	The Time Warrior	"The Five Doctors" (Note: Sarah continues to travel with the Doctor following his regeneration in Planet of the Spiders, and after her later departure from the series serves as the Third Doctor's companion once more in "The Five Doctors".)
UNIT
Brigadier Lethbridge-Stewart	Nicholas Courtney	7, 8, 9, 10, 11	Spearhead from Space (Note: Lethbridge-Stewart appears alongside the Second Doctor as a colonel in The Web of Fear and subsequently as a brigadier in The Invasion.)	Planet of the Spiders (Note: Subsequently appears in Robot, Terror of the Zygons, Mawdryn Undead and Battlefield, and as the Second Doctor's companion in "The Five Doctors")
Sergeant John Benton	John Levene (Note: Darren Plant portrayed John Benton as a baby in The Time Monster, and Steven Stanley did so as a child in the direct-to-video release, Wartime.)	7, 8, 9, 10, 11	The Ambassadors of Death (Note: Benton appears alongside the Second Doctor in The Invasion as Corporal Benton.)	Planet of the Spiders (Note: Subsequently appears with the Fourth Doctor in Robot, Terror of the Zygons and The Android Invasion as WO2 Benton)
Captain Mike Yates	Richard Franklin	8, 9, 10, 11	Terror of the Autons	Planet of the Spiders

=== Fourth Doctor ===
Companion	Actor	Seasons	First serial	Last serial
Sarah Jane Smith	Elisabeth Sladen	12, 13, 14	Robot	The Hand of Fear
Harry Sullivan	Ian Marter	12, 13	Robot	Terror of the Zygons (Note: Harry also appears in The Android Invasion)
Leela	Louise Jameson	14, 15	The Face of Evil	The Invasion of Time
K9	John Leeson / David Brierly (voices)	15, 16, 17, 18	The Invisible Enemy	Warriors' Gate (Note: The "Mark I" incarnation of K-9, who leaves the Doctor in The Invasion of Time, returns in the independent spin-off series K-9, regenerating into a newer form. A further model of K-9, "Mark III", features in the pilot of K-9 and Company with Sarah Jane Smith, and Doctor Who episode "School Reunion" with the Tenth Doctor and Sarah Jane. Killed and replaced by K-9 Mark IV in the latter episode, he subsequently appears irregularly in The Sarah Jane Adventures, and also the Doctor Who episode "Journey's End".)
Romana I	Mary Tamm	16	The Ribos Operation	The Armageddon Factor
Romana II	Lalla Ward	17, 18, 1983 special	Destiny of the Daleks	"The Five Doctors" (Note: Romana leaves the Doctor in Warriors' Gate, and subsequently reappears as the Fourth Doctor's companion in "The Five Doctors" (in footage from Shada).)
Adric	Matthew Waterhouse	18	Full Circle	Logopolis (Note: Adric, Nyssa and Tegan continue travelling with the Doctor following his regeneration in Logopolis.)
Nyssa	Sarah Sutton	18	Logopolis (Note: Nyssa also appears in The Keeper of Traken.)	
Tegan Jovanka	Janet Fielding	18	Logopolis	

=== Fifth Doctor ===
Companion	Actor	Seasons	First serial	Last serial
Adric	Matthew Waterhouse	19	Castrovalva	Earthshock (Note: Adric also makes a cameo appearance in Time-Flight.) (Note: Also makes a cameo appearance in The Caves of Androzani)
Nyssa	Sarah Sutton	19, 20	Castrovalva	Terminus
Tegan Jovanka	Janet Fielding	19, 20, 21	Castrovalva	Resurrection of the Daleks
Vislor Turlough	Mark Strickson	20, 21	Mawdryn Undead	Planet of Fire
Kamelion	Gerald Flood (voice)	20, 21	The King's Demons (Note: Due to problems with the robotic prop, Kamelion was not featured in the five serials between his first and last stories. Planned scenes in The Awakening were cut and never broadcast.)	Planet of Fire
Peri Brown	Nicola Bryant	21	Planet of Fire	The Caves of Androzani (Note: Peri continues travelling with the Doctor following his regeneration in The Caves of Androzani.)

=== Sixth Doctor ===
Companion	Actor	Seasons	First serial	Last serial
Peri Brown	Nicola Bryant	21, 22, 23	The Twin Dilemma	Mindwarp
Mel Bush	Bonnie Langford	23	Terror of the Vervoids (Note: The series never establishes how Mel meets the Doctor, who first appears as part of the Doctor's future. Their first meeting is recounted in the Past Doctor Adventures novel Business Unusual and the Big Finish Productions audio-drama The Wrong Doctors.)	The Ultimate Foe (Note: Mel continues travelling with the Doctor following his regeneration in Time and the Rani.)

=== Seventh Doctor ===
Companion	Actor	Seasons	First serial	Last serial
Mel Bush	Bonnie Langford	24	Time and the Rani	Dragonfire (Note: Mel makes a cameo appearance in "The Power of the Doctor" (2022) and becomes a recurring guest star in the eras of the Fourteenth and Fifteenth Doctors.)
Ace	Sophie Aldred	24, 25, 26	Dragonfire	Survival

=== Eighth Doctor ===
Companion	Actor	Seasons	First serial	Last serial
Grace Holloway	Daphne Ashbrook	–	Doctor Who	

=== Ninth Doctor ===
Companion	Actor	Series	First episode	Last episode
Rose Tyler	Billie Piper (Note: Julia Joyce portrays a young Rose in "Father's Day")	1	"Rose"	"The Parting of the Ways" (Note: Rose continues travelling with the Doctor following his regeneration in "The Parting of the Ways".)
Adam Mitchell	Bruno Langley	1	"Dalek"	"The Long Game"
Captain Jack Harkness	John Barrowman	1	"The Empty Child"	"The Parting of the Ways"

=== Tenth Doctor ===
Companion	Actor	Series	First episode	Last episode
Rose Tyler	Billie Piper	2, 4	"The Christmas Invasion"	"Journey's End" (Note: Rose departs in "Doomsday", and makes brief cameo appearances in "Partners in Crime", "The Poison Sky" and "Midnight" before returning as a companion from "Turn Left" to "Journey's End". She briefly appears in "The End of Time", and in "The Day of the Doctor" as the interface of the Moment device selects an image of Rose to assist the War Doctor.)
Mickey Smith	Noel Clarke	2, 4	"School Reunion" (Note: Mickey is introduced in "Rose" as Rose's boyfriend and recurs regularly before becoming a companion.)	"Journey's End" (Note: Mickey departs in "The Age of Steel" and re-appears in "Army of Ghosts" / "Doomsday" before returning as a companion in "Journey's End". He also appears in "The End of Time".)
Donna Noble	Catherine Tate	2006 special, 4	"The Runaway Bride" (Note: Introduced in "Doomsday" as "The Bride")	"Journey's End" (Note: After initially refusing to join the Doctor on his travels in "The Runaway Bride", Donna returns as a regular companion from "Partners in Crime". She also appears in "The End of Time".)
Martha Jones	Freema Agyeman	3, 4	"Smith and Jones"	"Journey's End" (Note: Martha departs in "Last of the Time Lords", but returns from "The Sontaran Stratagem" to "The Doctor's Daughter" and again for "The Stolen Earth" / "Journey's End". She also appears in "The End of Time".)
Captain Jack Harkness	John Barrowman	3, 4	"Utopia"	"Journey's End" (Note: Jack rejoins the Doctor in "Utopia" before departing in "Last of the Time Lords", but returns again for "The Stolen Earth" / "Journey's End". He also appears in "The End of Time".)
Astrid Peth	Kylie Minogue	2007 special	"Voyage of the Damned"	
Sarah Jane Smith	Elisabeth Sladen	2, 4	"The Stolen Earth" (Note: Previously appears with the Tenth Doctor in "School Reunion".)	"Journey's End" (Note: Also appears in "The End of Time". Additionally, the Doctor appears alongside Sarah Jane in The Sarah Jane Adventures stories The Wedding of Sarah Jane Smith and Death of the Doctor, in his Tenth and Eleventh incarnations respectively.)
Jackson Lake	David Morrissey	2008 special	"The Next Doctor"	
Rosita Farisi	Velile Tshabalala	2008 special	"The Next Doctor"	
Lady Christina de Souza	Michelle Ryan	2009 Easter special	"Planet of the Dead"	
Adelaide Brooke	Lindsay Duncan (Note: Rachel Fewell portrays a younger Adelaide in flashback)	2009 Autumn special	"The Waters of Mars"	
Wilfred Mott	Bernard Cribbins	2009–10 specials	"The End of Time Part One" (Note: Wilf is introduced in "Voyage of the Damned" and recurs throughout series 4 as Donna's grandfather. He officially becomes a short-term companion in "The End of Time".)	"The End of Time Part Two"

=== Eleventh Doctor ===
Companion	Actor	Series	First episode	Last episode
Amy Pond	Karen Gillan (Note: Caitlin Blackwood plays a young Amy (as Amelia) in "The Eleventh Hour", "The Big Bang", "Let's Kill Hitler" and "The God Complex", along with archival footage in "The Angels Take Manhattan")	5, 6, 7	"The Eleventh Hour"	"The Angels Take Manhattan" (Note: Amy and Rory are left by the Doctor in "The God Complex", but appear briefly in "Closing Time" and feature as companions again in "The Wedding of River Song". They appear in the final scene of "The Doctor, the Widow and the Wardrobe", before returning as companions from "Asylum of the Daleks".) (Note: An illusionary Amy appears to the Doctor before his regeneration in "The Time of the Doctor".)
Rory Williams	Arthur Darvill (Note: A younger Rory is played by Ezekiel Wigglesworth in "Let's Kill Hitler".)	5, 6, 7	"The Vampires of Venice" (Note: Also appears in "The Eleventh Hour")	"The Angels Take Manhattan" (Note: Rory is killed in "Cold Blood", but returns in "The Pandorica Opens" as an Auton duplicate before being restored to humanity and resuming his travels with the Doctor and Amy in "The Big Bang".)
River Song	Alex Kingston (Note: Earlier incarnations of River Song (as Melody Pond) are played by Sydney Wade in "The Impossible Astronaut" / "Day of the Moon", and Maya Glace-Green and Nina Toussaint-White in "Let's Kill Hitler".)	6	"The Impossible Astronaut" (Note: River first appears alongside the Tenth Doctor in "Silence in the Library" / "Forest of the Dead", introduced as a companion from his relative future who calls the Doctor to her aid. Progressively younger versions of River subsequently summon the Eleventh Doctor in "The Time of Angels" / "Flesh and Stone" and "The Pandorica Opens" / "The Big Bang", before the future Doctor summons her to his death in "The Impossible Astronaut".)	"The Wedding of River Song" (Note: River refuses the Doctor's offer to travel with him permanently in "Day of the Moon". She subsequently features as a companion in "A Good Man Goes to War", "Let's Kill Hitler" and "The Wedding of River Song", and also appears in "Closing Time". She later appears in "The Angels Take Manhattan" and "The Name of the Doctor".)
Craig Owens	James Corden	6	"Closing Time" (Note: Also appears in "The Lodger")	
Clara Oswald	Jenna Coleman (Note: Sophie Downham appears as young Clara in the prequel to "The Bells of Saint John", "The Rings of Akhaten" and "The Name of the Doctor".)	7, 2013 specials	"The Snowmen" (Note: Coleman first appeared as Oswin Oswald in "Asylum of the Daleks", revealed in "The Name of the Doctor" to be one of multiple echoes of Clara distributed across time. In "The Snowmen", Coleman initially plays another echo of Clara, with her original iteration appearing briefly at the end of the episode. The latter Clara joins the Doctor permanently in "The Bells of Saint John".)	"The Time of the Doctor" (Note: Clara continues travelling with the Doctor following his regeneration in "The Time of the Doctor".)

=== Twelfth Doctor ===
Companion	Actor	Series	First episode	Last episode
Clara Oswald	Jenna Coleman	8, 9	"Deep Breath"	"Hell Bent" (Note: Clara dies in "Face the Raven" and appears only as an illusion in "Heaven Sent", before being temporarily rescued from death and appearing as a companion for the final time in "Hell Bent". She subsequently briefly appears in "Twice Upon a Time".)
River Song	Alex Kingston	2015 special	"The Husbands of River Song"	
Nardole	Matt Lucas	2016 special, 10	"The Return of Doctor Mysterio" (Note: Nardole first appears in "The Husbands of River Song" before appearing as a companion from "The Return of Doctor Mysterio".)	"The Doctor Falls" (Note: Nardole departs in "The Doctor Falls" before briefly reappearing in "Twice Upon a Time".)
Bill Potts	Pearl Mackie	10, 2017 special	"The Pilot"	"Twice Upon a Time"

=== Thirteenth Doctor ===
Companion	Actor	Series	First episode	Last episode
Graham O'Brien	Bradley Walsh	11, 12, 2021 special	"The Woman Who Fell to Earth"	"Revolution of the Daleks" (Note: Also appears in "The Power of the Doctor")
Ryan Sinclair	Tosin Cole	11, 12, 2021 special	"The Woman Who Fell to Earth"	"Revolution of the Daleks"
Yasmin Khan	Mandip Gill	11, 12, 13, 2022 specials	"The Woman Who Fell to Earth"	"The Power of the Doctor"
Captain Jack Harkness	John Barrowman	2021 special	"Revolution of the Daleks" (Note: Also appears in "Fugitive of the Judoon")	
Dan Lewis	John Bishop	13, 2022 specials	"The Halloween Apocalypse"	"The Power of the Doctor"
Ace	Sophie Aldred	2022 specials	"The Power of the Doctor"	
Tegan Jovanka	Janet Fielding	2022 specials	"The Power of the Doctor"	

=== Fourteenth Doctor ===
Companion	Actor	Series	First episode	Last episode
Donna Noble	Catherine Tate	2023 specials	"The Star Beast"	"The Giggle"

=== Fifteenth Doctor ===
Companion	Actor	Series	First episode	Last episode
Ruby Sunday	Millie Gibson	14, 15	"The Church on Ruby Road"	"The Reality War" (Note: Ruby departs in "Empire of Death" but she returns in "Lucky Day" and "Wish World" / "The Reality War".)
Joy Almondo	Nicola Coughlan	2024 special	"Joy to the World"	
Belinda Chandra	Varada Sethu	15	"The Robot Revolution"	"The Reality War"

== List of companions from other media ==
The Doctor Who spin-off media have seen the creation of new characters acting as new companions to the Doctor. Most of them have been created to feature as companions for the Sixth, Seventh and Eighth Doctor, in the new products presenting themselves as a prosecution of their adventures beyond the TV series, but there also are new companions for other Doctors.

=== First Doctor ===
Companion	Actor	Series	First story	Last story
John and Gillian	—N/a	TV Comic strips	The Klepton Parasites (1964)	The Experimenters (1966)
Oliver Harper	Tom Allen	Big Finish Productions audios	The Perpetual Bond (2011)	The First Wave (2011)

=== Second Doctor ===
Companion	Actor	Series	First story	Last story
John and Gillian	—N/a	TV Comic strips	The Extortioners (1966–67)	Invasion of the Quarks (1968)

=== Third Doctor ===
Companion	Actor	Series	First story	Last story
Jeremy Fitzoliver	Richard Pearce	BBC Radio dramas	The Paradise of Death (1993)	The Ghosts of N-Space (1996)

=== Fourth Doctor ===
Companion	Actor	Series	First story	Last story
Sharon Davies	(later played by Rhianne Starbuck)	Doctor Who Magazine strips	Doctor Who and the Star Beast (1980)	Dreamers of Death (1981)
Mrs Wibbsey	Susan Jameson	BBC audiobooks	The Stuff of Nightmares (2009)	Survivors in Space (2011)
Ann Kelso (Note: Later revealed to be named Anya Kingdom.)	Jane Slavin	Big Finish Productions audios	The Sinestran Kill (2019)	The Perfect Prisoners (2019) (Note: Ann departs the Doctor in The Perfect Prisoners but re-appears in The Dalek Protocol (2021).)
Margaret Hopwood	Nerys Hughes	Big Finish Productions audios	Ice Heist! (2023) (Note: Margaret first meets the Doctor in The Ravencliff Witch (2022) and later joins him as a companion in Ice Heist!)	The Ghost of Margaret (2023)
Naomi Cross	Eleanor Crooks	Big Finish Productions audios	The Storm of the Sea Devils (2024)	Dominant Species (2024)

=== Fifth Doctor ===
Companion	Actor	Series	First story	Last story
Gus Goodman	—N/a	Doctor Who Magazine strips	Lunar Lagoon (1983)	The Moderator (1984)
Erimem	Caroline Morris	Big Finish Productions audios	The Eye of the Scorpion (2001)	The Bride of Peladon (2008)
Thomas Brewster	John Pickard	Big Finish Productions audios	The Haunting of Thomas Brewster (2008)	A Perfect World (2008)
Amy (Note: Initially called Amy during her travels with the Doctor, she renames herself Abby before their reunion.)	Ciara Janson	Big Finish Productions audios	The Judgement of Isskar (2009)	The Chaos Pool (2009) (Note: Abby departs the Doctor in The Chaos Pool (2009) but re-appears in Wicked Sisters (2020).)
Hannah Bartholomew	Francesca Hunt	Big Finish Productions audios	Moonflesh (2014)	Masquerade (2014)
Brooke	Joanna Horton	Big Finish Productions audios	The Lady in the Lake (2018)	The Furies (2018)
Marc	George Watkins	Big Finish Productions audios	Tartarus (2019)	Nightmare of the Daleks (2021)

=== Sixth Doctor ===
Companion	Actor	Series	First story	Last story
Frobisher	(later played by Robert Jezek)	Doctor Who Magazine strips	The Shape Shifter (1984)	The World Shapers (1987) (Note: Frobisher departs the Sixth Doctor off-screen after The World Shapers, but they reunite in the graphic novel The Age of Chaos and the Big Finish Productions audio plays The Holy Terror and The Maltese Penguin.)
Grant Markham	—N/a	Virgin Missing Adventures	Time of Your Life (1995)	Killing Ground (1996)
Evelyn Smythe	Maggie Stables	Big Finish Productions audios	The Marian Conspiracy (2000)	Thicker than Water (2005) (Note: Evelyn's departure from the Sixth Doctor is depicted in flashbacks of Thicker than Water, where she reunites with the Sixth Doctor and new companion Mel. She re-appears with the Seventh Doctor in A Death in the Family (2010).)
Charley Pollard (Note: Mentioned in The Night of the Doctor.)	India Fisher	Big Finish Productions audios	The Condemned (2007)	Blue Forgotten Planet (2009)
Mila	India Fisher, Jess Robinson	Big Finish Productions audios	Patient Zero (2009)	Blue Forgotten Planet (2009)
Thomas Brewster	John Pickard	Big Finish Productions audios	The Crimes of Thomas Brewster (2011)	Industrial Evolution (2011)
Flip Jackson	Lisa Greenwood	Big Finish Productions audios	The Curse of Davros (2012) (Note: Flip first meets the Doctor in The Crimes of Thomas Brewster (2011) and later joins him as a companion from The Curse of Davros to Scavenger (2014). She re-joins the Doctor and new companion Constance in Quicksilver (2016).)	TBC
Constance Clarke	Miranda Raison	Big Finish Productions audios	Criss-Cross (2015)	TBC
Hebe Harrison	Ruth Madeley	Big Finish Productions audios	The Rotting Deep (2022)	The Wrong Side of History (2023)

=== Seventh Doctor ===
Companion	Actor	Series	First story	Last story
Frobisher	(later played by Robert Jezek)	Doctor Who Magazine strips	A Cold Day in Hell! (1987–88)	
Olla	—N/a	Doctor Who Magazine strips	A Cold Day in Hell! (1987–88)	Redemption! (1988)
Bernice Summerfield	(later played by Lisa Bowerman)	Virgin New Adventures	Love and War (1992)	Happy Endings (1996) (Note: Bernice departs the Seventh Doctor in Happy Endings, but later appears in Return of the Living Dad, So Vile a Sin, and Eternity Weeps. She rejoins the Seventh Doctor and Ace in the Big Finish Productions audio series The New Adventures of Bernice Summerfield.)
Roz Forrester	(later played by Yasmin Bannerman)	Virgin New Adventures	Original Sin (1995)	So Vile a Sin (1997)
Chris Cwej	(later played by Travis Oliver)	Virgin New Adventures	Original Sin (1995)	Lungbarrow (1997)
Hex Schofield	Philip Olivier	Big Finish Productions audios	The Harvest (2004)	Signs and Wonders (2014)
Elizabeth Klein	Tracey Childs	Big Finish Productions audios	A Thousand Tiny Wings (2010) (Note: Klein first meets the Doctor and Ace in Colditz (2001) and later joins him as a companion in A Thousand Tiny Wings.)	Daleks Among Us (2013) (Note: Klein travels with the Doctor from A Thousand Tiny Wings to The Architects of History (2010). A version of Klein from an alternative timeline meets the Doctor in UNIT: Dominion (2012), travels with him from Persuasion (2013) to Daleks Among Us, and encounters him again in Warlock's Cross (2018).)
Lysandra Aristedes	Maggie O'Neill	Big Finish Productions audios	Project: Destiny (2010)	Gods and Monsters (2012)
Raine Creevy	Beth Chalmers	Big Finish Productions audios	Crime of the Century (2011) (Note: Raine makes an earlier appearance in Thin Ice (2011) as a baby.)	UNIT: Dominion (2012) (Note: Raine travels with the Doctor and Ace and departs off-screen after Earth Aid (2011). She returns as a companion without Ace in UNIT: Dominion.)
Sally Morgan	Amy Pemberton	Big Finish Productions audios	House of Blue Fire (2011)	Afterlife (2013) (Note: Sally departs in Afterlife (2013) and later appears in Signs and Wonders (2014).)
Will Arrowsmith	Christian Edwards	Big Finish Productions audios	Persuasion (2013)	Daleks Among Us (2013)
Mags	Jessica Martin	Big Finish Productions audios	The Monsters of Gokroth (2019) (Note: Mags first appears in the TV serial "The Greatest Show in the Galaxy" before joining the Doctor as a companion in "The Monsters of Gokroth".)	An Alien Werewolf in London (2019)
Naomi Cross	Eleanor Crooks	Big Finish Productions audios	London Orbital (2022)	Catastrophix (2025)
Ray	Sara Griffiths	Big Finish Productions audios	Catastrophix (2025) (Note: Ray first appears in the TV serial "Delta and the Bannermen" before joining the Doctor as a companion in "Catastrophix".)	TBC

=== Eighth Doctor ===
Companion	Actor	Series	First story	Last story
Stacy Townsend	—N/a	Radio Times strips	Dreadnought (1996)	Coda (1997)
Ssard	—N/a	Radio Times strips	Dreadnought (1996)	Coda (1997)
Izzy Sinclair	(later played by Jemima Rooper)	Doctor Who Magazine strips	Endgame (1996)	Oblivion (2002–03)
Fey Truscott-Sade	—N/a	Doctor Who Magazine strips	Tooth and Claw (1997)	Wormwood (1998)
Destrii	—N/a	Doctor Who Magazine strips	Ophidius (2001)	The Flood (2004–05)
Bernice Summerfield	(later played by Lisa Bowerman)	Virgin New Adventures	The Dying Days (1997) (Note: Bernice meets the Eighth Doctor again in the Big Finish Productions audio plays The Company of Friends (2009) and Lies in Ruins (2019).)	
Sam Jones	—N/a	Eighth Doctor Adventures	The Eight Doctors (1997)	Interference – Book Two (1999)
Fitz Kreiner	(later played by Matt Di Angelo)	Eighth Doctor Adventures	The Taint (1999)	The Gallifrey Chronicles (2005)
Compassion	(later played by Jackie Skarvellis)	Eighth Doctor Adventures	Interference – Book One (1999)	The Ancestor Cell (2000) (Note: Compassion departs the Doctor in The Ancestor Cell, but later makes appearances in Escape Velocity and The Gallifrey Chronicles.)
Anji Kapoor	—N/a	Eighth Doctor Adventures	Escape Velocity (2001)	Timeless (2003) (Note: Anji departs the Doctor in Timeless and later makes a cameo appearance in The Gallifrey Chronicles.)
Trix MacMillan	—N/a	Eighth Doctor Adventures	Time Zero (2002)	The Gallifrey Chronicles (2005)
Charley Pollard	India Fisher	Big Finish Productions audios	Storm Warning (2001)	The Girl Who Never Was (2007)
C'rizz	Conrad Westmaas	Big Finish Productions audios	The Creed of the Kromon (2004)	Absolution (2007)
Lucie Miller	Sheridan Smith	Big Finish Productions audios	Blood of the Daleks (2007)	To the Death (2011) (Note: Lucie departs the Doctor in Death in Blackpool (2009) before re-appearing as the Monk's companion in The Book of Kells / The Resurrection of Mars (2010). She later appears alongside the Doctor in Relative Dimensions, Prisoner of the Sun, and Lucie Miller / To the Death (2010-2011).)
Mary Shelley	Julie Cox	Big Finish Productions audios	The Company of Friends (2009)	Army of Death (2011)
Tamsin Drew	Niky Wardley	Big Finish Productions audios	Situation Vacant (2010)	To the Death (2011) (Note: Tamsin departs the Doctor in The Resurrection of Mars (2010) to join the Monk. She later appears alongside the Monk in Lucie Miller / To the Death (2011).)
Molly O'Sullivan	Ruth Bradley, Sorcha Cusack	Big Finish Productions audios	The Great War (2012)	Rule of the Eminence (2014) (Note: Molly departs the Doctor in Rule of the Eminence. An older version of Molly played by Sorcha Cusack re-appears in Master of the Daleks / Eye of Darkness (2015).)
Liv Chenka	Nicola Walker	Big Finish Productions audios	The Traitor (2014) (Note: Liv initially appears in Robophobia (2011) alongside the Seventh Doctor before joining the Eighth Doctor as a companion in The Traitor.)	Best Year Ever (2022) (Note: In a flashforward in Best Day Ever, Liv is depicted as returning to Earth to live with Tania, though the circumstances of her departure is still unknown.)
Helen Sinclair	Hattie Morahan	Big Finish Productions audios	The Red Lady (2015)	TBC
Josie Day	—N/a	Titan Comics	The Pictures of Josephine Day (2015)	A Matter of Life and Death (2016)
Bliss	Rakhee Thakrar	Big Finish Productions audios	The Starship of Theseus (2017)	Restoration of the Daleks (2020)
Tania Bell	Rebecca Root	Big Finish Productions audios	Lost Property (2020)	Best Year Ever (2022)
Andy Davidson	Tom Price	Big Finish Productions audios	Must-See TV (2020) (Note: Tom Price portrays the character in the Doctor Who spin-off series Torchwood and its corresponding spin-off media.)	Best Year Ever (2022)
Alex Campbell	Sonny McGann	Big Finish Productions audios	Meanwhile, Elsewhere (2023) (Note: Alex appears alongside the Eighth Doctor in An Earthly Child, Relative Dimensions, and Lucie Miller / To the Death (2010-2011). At the end of Restoration of the Daleks (2020), the Doctor encounters an alternate universe counterpart of Alex who joins him as a companion starting in Meanwhile, Elsewhere.)	TBC
Cass Fermazzi	Emma Campbell-Jones	Big Finish Productions audios	Meanwhile, Elsewhere (2023) (Note: Emma Campbell-Jones appears as Cass alongside the Eighth Doctor in the 2013 TV special mini-episode The Night of the Doctor where she apparently meets the Doctor for the first time, before both of them died in a crash. The Doctor encounters an earlier version of Cass during the Time War who joins him as a companion starting in Meanwhile, Elsewhere.)	TBC
Audacity Montague	Jaye Griffiths	Big Finish Productions audios	The Devouring (2023)	TBC
Alfie Steep	Sam Stafford	Big Finish Productions audios	Chase (2026)	TBC
Chase Moyo	Natalie Gumede	Big Finish Productions audios	Chase (2026)	TBC

=== War Doctor ===
Companion	Actor	Series	First story	Last story
Cinder	—N/a	New Series Adventures	Engines of War (2014)	
Cardinal Ollistra	Jacqueline Pearce	Big Finish Productions audios	The Innocent (2015)	The Enigma Dimension (2017)
Case	Ajjaz Awad	Big Finish Productions audios	Consequences (2021)	Exit Strategy (2023)
Cora	Sheila Ruskin	Big Finish Productions audios	Morbius the Mighty (2024)	
Louisa Tickson	Daisy Ashford	Big Finish Productions audios	Fallen Heroes (2025)	
Nesta	Mitra Djalili	Big Finish Productions audios	Cybergene (2025)	

=== Ninth Doctor ===
Companion	Actor	Series	First story	Last story
Tara Mishra	—N/a	Titan Comics	Official Secrets (2016)	The Bidding War (2017)
Nova	Camilla Beeput	Big Finish Productions audios	Sphere of Freedom (2021)	Food Fight (2021)
Liv Chenka	Nicola Walker	Big Finish Productions audios	Flatpack (2022)	
Tania Bell	Rebecca Root	Big Finish Productions audios	Flatpack (2022)	
Callen Lennox	Adam Martyn	Big Finish Productions audios	Red Darkness (2023)	The Green Gift (2023)
Doyle	Harki Bhambra	Big Finish Productions audios	Red Darkness (2023)	The Green Gift (2023)
Bernice Summerfield	Lisa Bowerman	Big Finish Productions audios	Ancient History (2024)	

=== Tenth Doctor ===
Companion	Actor	Series	First story	Last story
Majenta Pryce	—N/a	Doctor Who Magazine strips	Thinktwice (2008) (Note: Majenta initially appears in Hotel Historia before joining the Doctor as a companion in Thinktwice.)	The Crimson Hand (2009–10)
Heather McCrimmon	—N/a	Doctor Who Adventures strips	The Chromosome Connection (2009)	Dead-line (2010) (Note: After her departure in Dead-line, Heather makes a guest appearance in Lucky Heather.)
Wolfgang Ryter	—N/a	Doctor Who Adventures strips	Flight of the Giurgeax (2009)	Bad Wolfie (2009) (Note: After his departure in Bad Wolfie, Wolfgang makes a guest appearance in Lucky Heather.)
Matthew Finnegan	—N/a	IDW Publishing comics	Silver Scream (2009)	Final Sacrifice (2010)
Emily Winter	—N/a	IDW Publishing comics	Silver Scream (2009)	Final Sacrifice (2010)
Gabby Gonzalez	—N/a	Titan Comics	Revolutions of Terror (2014)	The Good Companion (2018)
Cindy Wu	—N/a	Titan Comics	Arena of Fear (2014) (Note: Cindy appears in a number of issues as a friend of Gabby's starting from Revolutions of Terror until she finally joins as a companion in Arena of Fear.)	The Good Companion (2018)
Anubis	—N/a	Titan Comics	Breakfast at Tyranny's (2017) (Note: Anubis appears in a number of issues starting from Spiral Staircase until he finally joins as a companion in Breakfast at Tyranny's.)	The Good Companion (2018)
Anya Kingdom	Jane Slavin	Big Finish Productions audios	Buying Time (2021)	The Triumph of Davros (2021)
Mark Seven	Joe Sims	Big Finish Productions audios	Buying Time (2021)	The Triumph of Davros (2021)
Rani Chandra	Anjli Mohindra	Big Finish Productions audios	The Hidden (2027)	TBC

=== Eleventh Doctor ===
Companion	Actor	Series	First story	Last story
Kevin	—N/a	IDW Publishing comics	When Worlds Collide (2011)	Space Squid (2011)
Decky Flamboon	—N/a	Doctor Who Adventures strips	Meteorite Meeting (2012)	The Tail of Decky Flamboon (2013)
Alice Obiefune	—N/a	Titan Comics	After Life (2014)	Without a Paddle (2018)
John Jones	—N/a	Titan Comics	What He Wants... (2014)	The Scream (2017)
ARC	—N/a	Titan Comics	Whodunnit (2014)	The Comfort of the Good (2015)
Abslom Daak	—N/a	Titan Comics	The Then and the Now (2015)	Physician, Heal Thyself (2016)
The Squire	—N/a	Titan Comics	The Then and the Now (2015)	Gently Pulls the Strings (2016)
The Sapling	—N/a	Titan Comics	The Scream (2018)	Hungry Thirsty Roots (2018)
Valarie Lockwood	Safiyya Ingar	Big Finish Productions audios	The Inheritance (2022)	Victory of the Doctor (2024)
Roanna	Mia Tomlinson	Big Finish Productions audios	Daleks Victorious (2024)	Victory of the Doctor (2024)
Eleanor Fong	Jasmine Bayes	Big Finish Productions audios	The Final Cut (2026)	TBC

=== Twelfth Doctor ===
Companion	Actor	Series	First story	Last story
Hattie Munroe	—N/a	Titan Comics	"The Twist" (2016)	"Beneath the Waves" (2017)
Jess Collins	—N/a	Doctor Who Magazine strips	"The Pestilent Heart" (2016)	"Doorway to Hell" (2017)
Maxwell Collins	—N/a	Doctor Who Magazine strips	"Moving In" (2016)	"Doorway to Hell" (2017)
Jata	—N/a	Doctor Who Adventures strips	"From the Horse's Mouth" (2016)	"Killer App" (2017)
Alex Yow	—N/a	New Series Adventures audiobooks	"The Lost Angel"	"The Lost Flame"
Brandon Yow	—N/a	New Series Adventures audiobooks	"The Lost Angel"	"The Lost Flame"
Keira Sanstrom	Bhavnisha Parmar	Big Finish Productions audios	"Flight to Calandra" (2021)	"You Only Die Twice" (2024)
Ash Wilton	Gwithian Evans	Big Finish Productions audios	"The Second Death" (2026)	TBC

=== Fugitive Doctor ===
Companion	Actor	Series	First story	Last story
Taslo	—N/a	Titan Comics	Origins (2022)	

== See also ==
- List of Doctor Who cast members

== Bibliography ==
- Ainsworth, John, ed. (2015a). "100,000 BC and The Mutants (aka The Daleks)". Doctor Who: The Complete History. Vol. 1, no. 4. London: Panini Comics, Hachette Partworks. ISSN 2057-6048.
- Ainsworth, John, ed. (2015b). "Robot, The Ark in Space and The Sontaran Experiment". Doctor Who: The Complete History. Panini Comics, Hachette Partworks. ISSN 2057-6048.
- Ainsworth, John, ed. (2016). "The Crusade, The Space Museum, The Chase and The Time Meddler". Doctor Who: The Complete History. Vol. 5, no. 11. London: Panini Comics, Hachette Partworks. ISSN 2057-6048.
- Ainsworth, John, ed. (2016b). "Planet of the Daleks, The Green Death and The Time Warrior". Doctor Who: The Complete History (20). Panini Comics, Hachette Partworks. ISSN 2057-6048.
- Ainsworth, John (9 March 2016). Doctor Who: The Complete History: The Deadly Assassin – The Face of Evil – The Robots of Death – The Talons of Weng-Chiang. Hachette Partworks, Panini Publishing. ISSN 2057-6048.
- Ainsworth, John, ed. (2017). "Doctor Who (The TV Movie)". Doctor Who: The Complete History. Panini Comics, Hachette Partworks. ISSN 2057-6048.
- Ainsworth, John (2018). "The Return of Doctor Mysterio and The Pilot". Doctor Who: The Complete History. Vol. 85. Panini Comics, Hachette Partworks.
- Aronoff, Jared (28 December 2017). "Deconstructing Clara Who. A Female Doctor Made Possible by an Impossible Girl". Series - International Journal of TV Serial Narratives. V. 3: 17–30 Paginazione. doi:10.6092/ISSN.2421-454X/7627.
- Chapman, James (19 September 2006). Inside the TARDIS: The Worlds of Doctor Who. I B Tauris. ISBN 978-1-84511-163-2.
- Frankham-Allen, Andy (2013). Companions: Fifty Years of Doctor Who Assistants. Candy Jar Books. ISBN 978-0957154889.
- Hardt, Maria-Xenia (2022). Heroism in Doctor Who: 1963–2020. Ergon. doi:10.5771/9783956509841. ISBN 978-3-95650-984-1.
- Howe, David J.; Stammers, Mark (1995). Doctor Who: Companions. Virgin Publishing. ISBN 1852275820.
- Kenneth Muir, John (2007). A Critical History of Doctor Who on Television. McFarland Publishing. ISBN 978-0-7864-3716-0.
- Kistler, Alan (1 October 2013). Doctor Who: A History. Rowman & Littlefield. ISBN 978-1-4930-0016-6.
- Nicol, Danny (29 May 2020). "Doctor Who, Family and National Identity". Entertainment and Sports Law Journal. 18 (1). doi:10.16997/eslj.255. ISSN 1748-944X.
- Powers, Tom (2016). Palumbo, Donald E.; Sullivan, C. W., III (eds.). Gender and the Quest in British Science Fiction Television: An Analysis of Doctor Who, Blake's 7, Red Dwarf and Torchwood. McFarland. ISBN 978-1-4766-6552-8.
- Wright, Mark, ed. (2016a). "Genesis of the Daleks, Revenge of the Cybermen and Terror of the Zygons". Doctor Who: The Complete History. Vol. 23. Panini UK Ltd. ISSN 2057-6048.
- Wright, Mark, ed. (2016b). "Castrovalva, Four to Doomsday and Kinda". Doctor Who: The Complete History. No. 34. Panini Comics, Hachette Partworks. ISSN 2057-6048.
- Wright, Mark, ed. (2017). "State of Decay, Warrior's Gate, The Keeper of Traken and Logopolis". Doctor Who: The Complete History (33). Panini Comics, Hachette Partworks. ISSN 2057-6048.
- Wright, Mark, ed. (2018a). "The Dalek Invasion of Earth, The Rescue, The Romans and The Web Planet". Doctor Who: The Complete History. Vol. 4, no. 61. London: Panini Comics, Hachette Partworks. ISSN 2057-6048.
- Wright, Mark, ed. (2018b). "Resurrection of the Daleks, Planet of Fire and The Caves of Androzani". Doctor Who: The Complete History. No. 39. Panini Comics, Hachette Partworks. ISSN 2057-6048.
- Wright, Mark, ed. (2018c). "The Seeds of Doom, The Masque of Mandragora and The Hand of Fear". Doctor Who: The Complete History. No. 25. Panini Comics, Hachette Partworks. ISSN 2057-6048.
