= Christopher Bulis =

British writer

Christopher Bulis is a writer best known for his work on various Doctor Who spin-offs. He is one of the most prolific authors to write for the various ranges of spin-offs from the BBC Television series Doctor Who, with twelve novels to his name, and between 1993 and 2000 he had at least one Doctor Who novel published every year.

== Work ==
Bulis' first published work was The New Adventure Shadowmind, published in 1993 by Virgin Publishing. This was the only novel Bulis wrote featuring the Seventh Doctor, and his next five books were all published under Virgin's Missing Adventures range: State of Change (1994), The Sorcerer's Apprentice (1995), The Eye of the Giant (1996), Twilight of the Gods (1996), and A Device of Death (1997).

When Virgin lost their licence to publish novels based on Doctor Who, Bulis repeated this pattern, writing novels for the BBC, with one novel written for the current incumbent Doctor as part of BBC Books' Eighth Doctor Adventures range and then all of his other novels published as part of the Past Doctor Adventures range. Bulis' novels for the BBC were The Ultimate Treasure (1997), Vanderdeken's Children (1998), City at World's End (1999), Imperial Moon (2000), and Palace of the Red Sun (2002).

Bulis also wrote the novel Tempest as part of Virgin's Bernice Summerfield range of novels and a short story for Big Finish Productions' Short Trips series.
