= Enter Wildthyme =

2011 novel by Paul Magrs

- Author: Paul Magrs
- Series: Iris Wildthyme
- Published: May 2011 snowbooks
- Pages: 390
- ISBN: 978-1907777059 (paperback); 978-1907777042 (hardback); 978-1907777462 (digital ed.)
- Followed by: Wildthyme Beyond
- Website: Enter Wildthyme page at snowbooks.com

Enter Wildthyme is a novel by Paul Magrs featuring the characters of Iris Wildthyme and her companion, Panda. It is the first in a series of Iris Wildthyme novels published by Snowbooks.
