= Verdigris (novel) =

2000 novel by Paul Magrs

- Author: Paul Magrs
- Series: Doctor Who book: Past Doctor Adventures
- Release number: 30
- Subject: Featuring: Third Doctor; Jo, Iris Wildthyme, cameos from UNIT and the Master
- Set in: Period between The Time Monster and The Three Doctors
- Publisher: BBC Books
- Publication date: April 2000
- Pages: 244
- ISBN: 0-563-55592-0
- Preceded by: Tomb of Valdemar
- Followed by: Grave Matter

Verdigris is a BBC Books original novel written by Paul Magrs and based on the long-running British science fiction television series Doctor Who. It features the Third Doctor, Jo Grant and Iris Wildthyme.

== Plot ==
Orbiting above London is a mysterious ship, a duplicate of the St Pancras railway station. The Doctor, with the aid of the adventurer, Iris Wildthyme, bargains to stop creatures determined to infiltrate in the guise of characters from nineteenth century novels. The Doctor is cut off from many of his friends and allies.

=== Continuity ===
Iris Wildthyme had earlier appeared in other Paul Magrs written Doctor Who stories, such as a short prose found in the first two volumes of BBC Books' Short Trips series and The Scarlet Empress. The character would later be expanded into her own spin-off series of books and audio dramas. In the audio dramas, Wildythme is portrayed by Katy Manning, who originally portrayed Jo, a character featured heavily in this book.

Her companion later Tom reappears in the Doctor Who audio dramas Wildthyme at Large and The Devil in Ms Wildthyme, and the anthology Wildthyme on Top.
