= Iris Wildthyme =

- Doctor Who character
- First appearance: Marked for Life
- Last appearance: Ongoing
- Portrayed by: Katy Manning (voice)

In-universe information
- Species: Humanoid (speculated to be a Time Lord)
- Affiliation: None
- Home: Unknown (speculated to be Gallifrey)
- Home era: If from Gallifrey, most likely the Rassilon Era

Iris Wildthyme is a fictional character created by writer Paul Magrs, who has appeared in short stories, novels and audio dramas from numerous publishers. She is best known from spin-off media based on the long-running British science fiction television series Doctor Who, where she is sometimes depicted as a renegade Time Lord.

Her stories are in the New Wave mold, characterised by nonlinear, sometimes stream of consciousness narrative, intertextual references to the rest of Doctor Who and popular culture, and themes of unreliable narration. She has a playful, mischievous personality, delighting in baiting the Doctor and getting into trouble.

== History ==
Iris Wildthyme first appears in one of Magrs's non-genre novels, Marked for Life, as a lesbian novelist who has lived for far longer than a normal lifespan. At the end of the novel, Iris Wildthyme seems to die and then become a baby in a scene reminiscent of regeneration. The infant Iris appears in later books by Magrs taking place in the same Phoenix Court setting, and an apparently adult version re-appears in the story "Hospitality", in the collection Iris: Abroad.

Iris's first Doctor Who appearance is in the short story "Old Flames", where she meets the Fourth Doctor and Sarah. The Doctor already knows Iris as an "old friend", and she is seen to be travelling in a 20th-century London AEC Routemaster double-decker bus (the route 22 to Putney Common), which is, in reality, her TARDIS.

The character was described as "a studied affront" to existing Doctor Who texts and "an ethical challenge" to some of the series' "main inconsistencies". In 2011, SFX called Iris Wildthyme one of the 'Top 5 Spinoff Companions' and said 'her adventures (with the Doctor, and in her own line of books) are a joy'.

Iris was featured at length in The Scarlet Empress and The Blue Angel, and went on to appear in several more short stories and novels in the BBC Books range, most recently Mad Dogs and Englishmen in 2002.

Since then the character has been the subject of a number of short story anthologies, edited by Magrs and others, published by Obverse Books and one by Big Finish Productions, and two novels published by Snowbooks.

In 2001, Philip Purser-Hallard submitted a proposal for a novel, Iris Wildthyme in the City of the Saved, which would have seen Iris in a hedonistic artificial world at the end of time where all people are resurrected and made immortal. It was rejected as an Iris Wildthyme novel range was considered unviable at the time. Purser-Hallard reused elements of the story in 2002's The Book of the War (in which Iris appears as an unnamed traveller) and 2004's Of the City of the Saved....

In 2002, the character started appearing as an occasional crossover character in audio plays by Big Finish Productions, where she is voiced by Katy Manning. Following the casting of Manning in the role, imagery of the character used by Big Finish (and, later, Obverse Books) on packaging and covers now depicts Manning's likeness.

The character has appeared as the main character in five "seasons" of audio dramas, released respectively in 2005, 2009, 2012, 2013 and 2015, along with a 2009 Christmas special. Each release of the second season is a pastiche of a decade of televised Doctor Who, from the 1960s through to the 1990s. The 2012 release Iris Rides Out is a crossover with the out-of-copyright character Carnacki the Ghost-Finder.

Although in some of her early appearances (including Verdigris and Wildthyme on Top) Iris is accompanied by her companion Tom (played on audio by Ortis Deley), her usual foil in her Big Finish, Obverse Books and Snowbooks appearances is Panda, a 10-inch-tall sentient, stuffed toy (played on audio by David Benson).

== Character ==
Iris claims to have been raised by a House of Aunts (as opposed to Cousins), in the mountains of southern Gallifrey, and also that she has erased all of her records from the Matrix, explaining why the Time Lords know nothing about her. She is known to have survived the destruction of Gallifrey and the apparent retroactive wiping of the Time Lords from history that took place at the end of the novel The Ancestor Cell.

Iris regenerates at the end of The Scarlet Empress (into a form resembling Jane Fonda in Barbarella), and is known to have at least six other incarnations. One of these, Bianca (voiced by Maria McErlane), appears in the Big Finish Productions audio play The Wormery and is similar to the Doctor's villainous Valeyard incarnation. Iris has also apparently worked for UNIT as a Scientific Advisor, and for the Ministry of Incursions and Ontological Wonders (MIAOW).

There is no indication of what relationship the character has with the new television series. In "The End of the World" (2005), the Doctor states that his homeworld had been destroyed and that he is the last of the Time Lords.

Attempting to pin down the exact details of Iris's history is problematic because such details are not only kept deliberately vague by Magrs and other writers, but also because the accounts of her adventures may not be reliable, in whole or in part. For example, some of her claimed exploits bear a remarkable similarity to those of the Doctor's, and some have suggested that it is the Doctor's adventures that are plagiarised from Iris's life, rather than the other way around.

Her TARDIS is a double-decker red London bus, the number 22 to Putney Common. In contrast with other TARDISes, hers is slightly smaller on the inside, a fact attributed to the fact that her TARDIS was dying when she found it. She also claims to have stolen the TARDIS, and to be on the run from her "mysterious superiors".

Iris has also argued that her adventures are more "true" than the Doctor's recollections because she writes them in her diaries while the Doctor does not. Magrs has explicitly stated that Iris "knows — of course she knows — that she's a very deliberate parody of Doctor Who. That's why she loves him so." In postmodernist style, Iris is portrayed as playfully aware that she is a character in a television programme (or a series of books and audio dramas spun off from a television programme). Even more so than the Doctor's TARDIS, Iris's bus is a device for moving her between fictional genres and even texts. In the context of the Doctor Who universe, all this may be explained by Iris's claim in the novel The Blue Angel that she is from the Obverse, a surreal parallel universe with radically different physical laws. More recently in both Big Finish audios and Obverse Books short stories, she has claimed to come from The Clockworks, a planet in the Obverse, ruled over by a race not unlike the Time Lords.

== List of appearances ==
=== Phoenix Court novels by Paul Magrs ===
- Marked for Life (Vintage Books 1995)
- Does It Show? (Vintage Books 1997)
- Could It Be Magic? (Vintage Books 1998)

=== BBC Doctor Who novels ===
- The Scarlet Empress by Paul Magrs (1998)
- The Blue Angel by Paul Magrs and Jeremy Hoad (1999)
- Verdigris by Paul Magrs (2000)
- Mad Dogs and Englishmen by Paul Magrs (2002)

=== Snowbooks novels ===
- Enter Wildthyme by Paul Magrs (Snowbooks, 2011)
- Wildthyme Beyond by Paul Magrs (Snowbooks, 2012)
- From Wildthyme with Love by Paul Magrs (Snowbooks, 2013)

=== The New Adventures of Iris Wildthyme ===
- Iris Wildthyme and the Polythene Terror (Obverse Books, 2019)
- Mother, Maiden, Crone (Obverse Books, 2020)

=== Short stories by Paul Magrs ===
- "Old Flames" in Short Trips (BBC Books 1998, ed Stephen Cole)
- "Femme Fatale" in More Short Trips (BBC Books 1999, ed Stephen Cole)
- "Entertaining Mr O" in Perfect Timing (1999, ed Mark Phippen and Helen Fayle)
- "Bafflement and Devotion" in Doctor Who Magazine (essay with fictional elements)
- "Being an Extract from 'The Amazing Adventures of Iris Wildthyme on Neptune'" in Tales of the Solar System (2000, ed D Paul Griggs)
- "In the Sixties" in Walking in Eternity (2001, ed Julian Eales), reprinted in Twelve Stories (Salt Publishing, 2009)
- "Suitors, Inc." in Short Trips: Seven Deadly Sins (Big Finish Productions 2005, ed David Bailey)
- "The Dreadful Flap" in Iris Wildthyme and the Celestial Omnibus (Obverse Books 2009, ed Paul Magrs & Stuart Douglas)
- "The Delightful Bag" in The Panda Book of Horror (Obverse Books 2009, ed Stuart Douglas & Paul Magrs)
- "Hospitality" in Iris: Abroad (Obverse Books 2009, ed Stuart Douglas & Paul Magrs)
- "Hang onto Yourself" in Lady Stardust (Obverse Books 2012, ed Art Critic Panda)
- "The Ninnies on Putney Common" in Fifteen (also known as Iris:Fifteen, Obverse Books, 2013, ed. Stuart Douglas, ISBN 978-1909031159)

=== Short story anthologies ===
- Wildthyme on Top ed Paul Magrs (Big Finish Productions 2005)
- Iris Wildthyme and the Celestial Omnibus eds Paul Magrs and Stuart Douglas (Obverse Books, 2009)
- The Panda Book of Horror eds Stuart Douglas and Paul Magrs (Obverse Books, 2009)
- Iris: Abroad eds Paul Magrs and Stuart Douglas (Obverse Books, 2010)
- Wildthyme in Purple eds Stuart Douglas and Cody Quijano-Schell (Obverse Books, 2011)
- Lady Stardust ed Art Critic Panda (Obverse Books, 2012)
- Fifteen ed Stuart Douglas (Obverse Books, 2013)
- Iris Wildthyme of Mars ed Philip Purser-Hallard (Obverse Books, 2014)
- The Perennial Miss Wildthyme ed Dale Smith (Obverse Books, 2015)
- A Clockwork Iris ed Stuart Douglas, George Mann, and Paul Magrs (Obverse Books, 2017)
- Wild Thymes on the 22 ed Stewart Sheargold (Obverse Books, 2019)
- Locked in Space ed Stewart Sheargold (Obverse Books, 2023)

=== Novelette anthologies ===
- Ms Wildthyme and Friends Investigate (Obverse Books, 2010)

=== Cwej: The Series ===
- "Flickering Flame" by Andy Lane

=== Big Finish audio plays ===
==== Series 1 (2005) ====
Featuring Ortis Deley as Tom and David Benson as Panda. Artwork for both releases in Series 1 was by Stuart Manning.

No.	Title	Directed by	Written by	Featuring	Released
1	"Wildthyme at Large"	Gary Russell	Paul Magrs	Tom, Panda	November 2005
2	"The Devil in Ms Wildthyme"	Gary Russell	Stephen Cole	Tom, Panda	December 2005

==== Series 2 (2009) ====
Featuring David Benson as Panda. Each individual release parodied Doctor Who from one decade between the 1960s and the 1990s.

No.	Title	Directed by	Written by	Featuring	Released
1	"The Sound of Fear"	Gary Russell	Mark Michalowski	Panda	February 2009
2	"Land of Wonder"	Gary Russell	Paul Magrs	Panda	March 2009
3	"The Two Irises"	Gary Russell	Simon Guerrier	Panda	April 2009
4	"The Panda Invasion"	Gary Russell	Mark Magrs	Panda	May 2009

==== Special (2009) ====
Featuring David Benson as Panda.

No.	Title	Directed by	Written by	Featuring	Released
–	"The Claws of Santa"	Gary Russell	Cavan Scott & Mark Wright	Panda, Mary	November 2009

==== Series 3 (2012) ====
Appearing in "Midwinter Murders", Stewart Bevan had previously appeared with Katy Manning in the Doctor Who story, The Green Death, playing Jo Grant's future husband.

No.	Title	Directed by	Written by	Featuring	Released
1	"The Iris Wildthyme Appreciation Society"	Gary Russell	Cavan Scott	Panda	August 2012
2	"Iris Rides Out"	Gary Russell	Guy Adams	Panda	August 2012
3	"Midwinter Murders"	Gary Russell	George Mann	Panda	August 2012

==== Series 4 (2013) ====
Featuring David Benson as Panda.

No.	Title	Directed by	Written by	Featuring	Released
1	"Whatever Happened to Iris Wildthyme?"	Gary Russell	Cavan Scott & Mark Wright	Panda	August 2013
2	"Iris at the Oche"	Gary Russell	Mark Wright	Panda	August 2013
3	"A Lift in Time"	Gary Russell	David Bryher	Panda	August 2013

==== Wildthyme Reloaded (2015) ====
No.	Title	Directed by	Written by	Featuring	Released
1	"Comeback of the Scorchies"	Scott Handcock	James Goss	Edwin Turner	August 2015
2	"Dark Side"	Scott Handcock	Nick Campbell	Edwin Turner	August 2015
3	"Oracle of the Supermarket"	Scott Handcock	Roy Gill	Edwin Turner	August 2015
4	"Murder at the Abbey"	Scott Handcock	Mark B. Oliver	Edwin Turner	August 2015
5	"The Slots of Giza"	Scott Handcock	Hamish Steele	Edwin Turner	August 2015
6	"High Spirits"	Scott Handcock	Cavan Scott	Edwin Turner	August 2015
7	"An Extraterrestrial Werewolf in Belgium"	Scott Handcock	Scott Handcock	Edwin Turner	August 2015
8	"Looking for a Friend"	Scott Handcock	Paul Magrs	Edwin Turner	August 2015
