= Grave Matter =

2000 novel by Justin Richards

- Author: Justin Richards
- Series: Doctor Who book: Past Doctor Adventures
- Release number: 31
- Subject: Featuring: Sixth Doctor; Peri
- Set in: Period right after Vengeance on Varos
- Publisher: BBC Books
- Publication date: May 2000
- Pages: 246
- ISBN: 0-563-55598-X
- Preceded by: Verdigris
- Followed by: Heart of TARDIS

Grave Matter is a BBC Books original novel written by Justin Richards and based on the long-running British science fiction television series Doctor Who. It features the Sixth Doctor and Peri.

== Synopsis ==
The Doctor and Peri arrive on a fog-shrouded island, not even aware of which century they have landed in. They soon discover that they are on a remote island off the coast of Britain where the local people have put aside modern inventions and lifestyle. However, when a dead body rises from its grave, and the local school children display uncanny adaptivity, the Doctor must discover the secrets of the scientific research carried out by the island's benefactor.
