= The Doctor =

Doctor Who character

- Doctor Who character
- The fifteen faces of the Doctor to date The Doctor as portrayed by the series leads in chronological order, left to right from top row
- First appearance: An Unearthly Child (1963)
- Created by: Sydney Newman
- Portrayed by: William Hartnell (1963–1966); Patrick Troughton (1966–1969); Jon Pertwee (1970–1974); Tom Baker (1974–1981); Peter Davison (1982–1984); Colin Baker (1984–1986); Sylvester McCoy (1987–1989); Paul McGann (1996); Christopher Eccleston (2005); David Tennant (2005–2010, 2023); Matt Smith (2010–2013); Peter Capaldi (2014–2017); Jodie Whittaker (2018–2022); Ncuti Gatwa (2023–2025)
- Other actors: Richard Hurndall (1983); John Hurt (2013); David Bradley (2017, 2022); Jo Martin (2020–2022, 2025)

Character biography
- Species: Time Lord
- Spouses: Elizabeth I; River Song
- Children: Jenny (daughter)
- Relatives: Susan Foreman (granddaughter); Tecteun (adoptive parent)
- Home planet: Gallifrey
- Main incarnations: First; Second; Third; Fourth; Fifth; Sixth; Seventh; Eighth; Ninth; Tenth; Eleventh; Twelfth; Thirteenth; Fourteenth; Fifteenth
- Other incarnations: The Valeyard; War Doctor; Fugitive Doctor

The Doctor, sometimes known as Doctor Who, (Note: Such naming is often thought to be erroneous, since the character is exclusively referred to as "The Doctor" onscreen and consistently corrected by the Doctor when referred to as "Doctor Who", but the character has been credited as "Dr Who" on television, in books, and is often referred to as such in the press.) is the protagonist of the long-running BBC science fiction television series Doctor Who. An extraterrestrial Time Lord, the Doctor travels the universe in a time travelling spaceship called the TARDIS, often with companions. Since the show's inception in 1963, the character has been portrayed by fourteen lead actors. The transition to each succeeding actor is explained within the show's narrative through the plot device of regeneration, a biological function of Time Lords that allows a change of cellular structure and appearance with recovery following a mortal injury.

A number of other actors have played the character in stage and audio plays, as well as in various film and television productions. The Doctor has also been featured in films and a vast range of spin-off novels, audio dramas and comic strips.

Ncuti Gatwa most recently portrayed the Fifteenth Doctor from "The Giggle" (2023) up to "The Reality War" (2025).

== Character biography ==
The Doctor is a Time Lord who travels through time and space in a dimensionally transcendental – "bigger on the inside" – time machine: the TARDIS. This time machine, whose name is an acronym for Time And Relative Dimension(s) In Space, takes the exterior form of a 1963 police telephone call box and retains the appearance throughout the programme. Human companions accompany the Doctor through their adventures and serve as audience surrogate characters to ask questions which allow the Doctor to provide relevant exposition.

"Doctor" is a self-selected alias. In episodes specifically under showrunner Steven Moffat, the story arcs surrounding events in the Doctor's future implied serious consequences in the event of the Doctor's true name being spoken, with the nature of these finally revealed in "The Time of the Doctor". Spin-off media offer the explanation that the Doctor's true name is unpronounceable by humans. In "The Name of the Doctor", the Eleventh Doctor tells companion Clara Oswald that the name "Doctor" is essentially a promise he made. The promise itself is revealed in "The Day of the Doctor": "Never cruel nor cowardly. Never give up. Never give in."

=== Early life ===
The episode "The Timeless Children" revised the Doctor's origins, revealing a scientist and space explorer named Tecteun who found a lone, mysterious child with a supernatural physiology – one not belonging to any other life form or species – and an immense intelligence. She adopted the child and studied her, successfully grafting her regeneration capacity (and possibly other traits) into her own species, the Shobogans, and herself. This species, who would eventually become the Time Lords, was restricted to a limit of twelve regenerations by a later incarnation of Tecteun. Tecteun and their child were eventually inducted into a clandestine Time Lord organisation known as the Division. After an unknown amount of regenerations, Tecteun's child began calling themself "Doctor". The Fugitive Doctor, true to her title, was on the run from the Division in a TARDIS disguised as a police box. The details of their life were also redacted from the Matrix – only snippets remaining, masked as the story of the Irish Garda Brendan. The true origins of the Time Lords remained hidden from themselves and from the Doctor.

The First Doctor's subsequent childhood on Gallifrey has been little described in the series. In "Hell Bent" the Doctor recalled his origins as a high-born Gallifreyan. In The Time Monster, the Doctor says he grew up in a house on a mountainside and talks about a hermit who lived under a tree behind the house and inspired the Doctor when he was depressed. He is later reunited with this former mentor, now on Earth posing as the abbot K'anpo Rimpoche, in Planet of the Spiders. In "The Girl in the Fireplace", according to Madame de Pompadour who psychically linked with the Doctor's memories, the Doctor experienced a very lonely childhood. An elderly woman on Gallifrey died and was shrouded in veils and surrounded by flies, giving the Doctor recurring nightmares, which the confession dial in "Heaven Sent" would later visualise to torment him. In "Listen", it is ambiguously revealed the Doctor as a child often slept alone in a barn in the Drylands (a desert region outside the city capital), was withdrawn from other children, and was cared for by guardian figures who privately doubted the child's ability as an eventual Time Lord. Through the dialogue, it is suggested that several Gallifreyan children were pressured into joining the army, a path which did not sit right with the Doctor's pacifist beliefs, and as a result he wished to enroll into the Time Lord Academy instead.

The classic series refers to his time at the academy and his affiliation with the notoriously devious Prydonian chapter of Time Lords. In "The Sound of Drums", the Doctor describes an academy initiation where, at the age of eight, Gallifreyan children were taken from their families and made to look into the Untempered Schism, a gap in the fabric of reality, to view the Time Vortex. According to the Doctor, when regarding the effects of the initiation on participants: "Some would be inspired, some would run away and some would go mad" (as he suggests happened to his nemesis, the Master). When asked to which group he belonged, he replied, "Oh, the ones that ran away. I never stopped!" The Doctor was taught by future Lord President Borusa and Azmael, where he met Drax, with whom he attended a Tech course as part of the class of '92. In The Armageddon Factor, it is revealed that the Doctor scraped through the academy with 51% on his second attempt. In The Time Meddler, it is said that the Doctor was fifty years before the Meddling Monk. In Time and the Rani, the Doctor claims to have attended university alongside the Rani, specialising in thermodynamics.

At the academy, he (Note: In World Enough and Time, the Doctor states of the Master and himself "I think she was a man back then. I'm fairly sure that I was, too. It was a long time ago, though.") met his childhood friend the Master and the pair grew up together. In "The End of Time", the Master recollects their childhood together where they would run all day across his father's field, described as 'pastures of red grass stretching far across the slopes of Mount Perdition' and the boys would call up at the sky. In "World Enough and Time", the Doctor claims that they both made a special pact where together they would visit every star in the universe; however, the Master was 'too busy burning them'. In "Hell Bent", one day at the academy, the Doctor found himself lost inside the Cloisters (an area located deep beneath the citadel) and spent four days inside. He was contacted by a Wraith who told him about the prophecy of a legendary creature known as 'the Hybrid', prophesied to have been crossbred from two warrior races that would stand in the ruins of Gallifrey, unravel the Web of Time and burn a billion hearts to heal its own. The Wraiths then revealed to him the secret passage leading to another side of the city. The last anyone heard from him was that he apparently stole the moon and the President's wife; however, this was revealed to have been a lie spread about by the Shobogans when in reality it was the President's daughter and he lost the moon. This event had a massive impact on the Doctor, who theorized that he himself was possibly the Hybrid. This is one reason the Doctor has stated as to why he decided to leave Gallifrey – out of fear. He has given convoluted and contradictory reasons as to why he left, for many reasons such as because his life path was pre-determined from his hidden previous life.

The Doctor stole a TARDIS with his granddaughter Susan from a repair shop on Gallifrey. In later episodes, the Doctor mentions that he once took a driving test to pilot a TARDIS and failed, and that he threw the instruction manual in a supernova because he disagreed with it. In "The Doctor's Wife", Idris (the TARDIS's living soul in a human body) mentions that the Doctor had been travelling with her for 700 years, which indicates that he would have been 200 years old when he first borrowed her. In "Twice Upon a Time", it is revealed that the Doctor also left to investigate the mystery of why good prevails in a universe where evil would seem to have so many advantages. It would be after his encounter with the Twelfth Doctor that the First Doctor realised that his actions made the difference in the balance between good and evil, with the Twelfth Doctor stating "The universe generally fails to be a fairy tale, but that's where we come in."

In other media, more has been revealed of the Doctor's early life. In the Past Doctor Adventures novel Divided Loyalties, the Doctor recalls his Academy years in a dream induced by the Celestial Toymaker. According to this, he was a member of an organisation called the Deca, ten brilliant Academy students campaigning for increased Time Lord intervention, alongside Mortimus (the Meddling Monk), Ushas (the Rani), Koschei (the Master), Magnus (the War Chief), Drax, a spy named Vansell, Millennia, Rallon and Jelpax. With this group, he learns about the Celestial Toymaker and travels to his realm in a type 18 TARDIS with Deca members Rallon and Millennia, who are killed. This leads to the Doctor's expulsion from the academy, condemned to five hundred years in Records and Traffic Control. In The Quantum Archangel, it is revealed the Doctor studied cosmic science alongside the Master, taught by Cardinal Sendok. In the Virgin Missing Adventures novel Goth Opera, it is said the Doctor was a frequent prankster while at the academy, introducing cats into Gallifrey's ecosystem with his friend Ruath and electrifying a "perigosto stick" belonging to his teacher, Borusa.

Feeling that too much of the Doctor's backstory had been revealed by the Seventh Doctor's era, writers Andrew Cartmel, Ben Aaronovitch and Marc Platt developed a new direction for the series. Cartmel wished to restore the character's "awe, mystery and strength" and make him "once again more than a mere chump of a Time Lord" – an idea the media dubbed the "Cartmel Masterplan". Under Cartmel, the show foreshadowed this concept; however, its 1989 cancellation meant that it was never realised onscreen. The proposed backstory was fully explored in Platt's 1997 novel Lungbarrow, where the Doctor is revealed as "the Other", a mysterious figure in Gallifreyan lore who co-founded Time Lord society with Rassilon and Omega. After a curse renders Gallifrey sterile, the Other devises biotechnological looms to "weave" new Time Lords; his granddaughter Susan is Gallifrey's last natural child. To escape a civil war with Rassilon, the Other throws himself into the loom system, where he is disintegrated and later woven into the Doctor. The Timeless Child reveal partly took inspiration from this.

=== Family ===
The Doctor's adoptive mother Tecteun was a native to Gallifrey and an explorer of the Shobogans, although the Doctor’s memories of Tecteun were erased when they were regressed to childhood again as the First Doctor.

Other than Tecteun and the First Doctor’s granddaughter Susan Foreman who appeared during the show’s first two seasons, references to the Doctor's other families (adopted or not) are rare in the programme. In The Tomb of the Cybermen, when asked about his family, the Second Doctor says his memories of them are alive when he wants them to be; otherwise they sleep in his mind and he forgets. In The Curse of Fenric, when asked if he has family, the Seventh Doctor replies that he does not know. In the 1996 television movie, the Eighth Doctor remarks that he is half-human on his mother's side, and recalls watching a meteor storm with his father on Gallifrey. The revived series never addresses a human mother again and at times even contradicted this remark: The half-human clone of the Tenth Doctor is initially disgusted to be half-human ("Journey's End") and the Twelfth Doctor rejects that he could be a hybrid of human and Time Lord ("Hell Bent"). The Doctor mentions having had a brother in "Smith and Jones", and sisters in "Arachnids in the UK". In "It Takes You Away", the Thirteenth Doctor claims that she had seven grandmothers. Later in the same scene, she mentions that her favourite grandmother, Granny 5, alleged Granny 2 was "a secret agent for the Zygons".

Throughout the revival, the Doctor routinely attempts to change the topic when questioned about being a parent or his family life, as in "Fear Her", "The Beast Below" and "A Good Man Goes to War". In "The Empty Child", a hospital doctor named Dr. Constantine says to him, "Before this war began, (Note: The episode takes place during the Second World War) I was a father and a grandfather. Now I'm neither. But I'm still a doctor." The Ninth Doctor's reply is, "Yeah. I know the feeling." In "The Doctor's Daughter", when discussing the topic of parenthood, the Tenth Doctor confirms that he had at one point been a father and that he lost his children "a long time ago", saying "When they died that part of me died with them"; the nature of their deaths, however, has never been explained, as it is suggested that whatever happened to his family is very painful for the Doctor to talk about. In "The Woman Who Fell to Earth" when the Thirteenth Doctor is questioned how she copes with the loss of her family, she states that she carries the memories of them with her and thus makes them a part of who she is, saying "even though they're gone from the world ... they're never gone from me."

In "The End of Time", a mysterious individual, referred to in the episode credits as "The Woman", appears unexpectedly to Wilfred Mott throughout both episodes. She is later revealed to be a dissident Time Lady, who opposed the Time Lord High Council's plan to escape the Time War. When she reveals her face to the Doctor, his reaction indicates that he recognises her. Julie Gardner, in the episode's commentary, states that while some have speculated that the Time Lady is the Doctor's mother, neither she nor Russell T. Davies is willing to comment on her identity. When later asked by Wilfred who she was, the Doctor evades answering the question, making their connection unclear. In Doctor Who: The Writer's Tale – The Final Chapter, Russell T Davies states that the character was conceived as the Doctor's mother, but her identity was left ambiguous to allow viewers to make up their own minds.

In spin-off media, several individuals related to the Doctor have made appearances, and do not appear in the television series, such as his grandchildren John and Gillian, who appeared alongside the First and Second Doctors in comics and annuals. Two different, conflicting accounts exist on the descendants of Susan after leaving the Doctor. In the audio play "An Earthly Child", it is revealed that Susan has had a half-human child, Alex Campbell, the Doctor's great-grandson. Alternatively, in the novel Legacy of the Daleks, Susan and her husband David adopt three children whom they name David Campbell Jr, Ian and Barbara; named after David himself, Ian Chesterton and Barbara Wright, respectively. Irving Braxiatel, a character first introduced in the novel Theatre of War, was initially hinted, and later confirmed, to be the Doctor's biological older brother. He has since become a recurring character, especially within the Big Finish spin-off audio series Gallifrey and Bernice Summerfield.

In the novel Father Time, the Eighth Doctor, during his hundred-year exile on Earth, found an orphaned Time Lord girl named Miranda whom he adopted and raised until she was 16. In the novel Sometime Never..., she returned to the Doctor with her daughter Zezanne. She was also the central character in a three-issue comic book series published by Comeuppance Comics in 2003. Author Lance Parkin, who devised the character of Miranda, has hinted that her real father is a future incarnation of the Doctor which, if so, would make Zezanne the Doctor's biological granddaughter as well. The Virgin New Adventures novel Lungbarrow presents an alternative take on the Doctor's origins, suggesting that Time Lords are "loomed" in large batches of "cousins" and not produced via sexual reproduction. Lungbarrow portrays the Doctor as one of 45 cousins grown from his house's genetic loom as an adult. By contrast, the TV programme has shown Time Lords as children and stated that Time Lords can have sexual relationships.

The concept of the Doctor being married has been explored in multiple stories. In "Blink", the Doctor mentioned that he was rubbish at his own wedding. In The Virgin New Adventures novel Cold Fusion, a Time Lord lady named Patience who was the widow of Omega, one of the founding-fathers of Gallifreyan society who fell into an anti-matter universe. Patience later met and married the Doctor and together they had thirteen children. Once their first-born son announced the arrival of a baby, the family was targeted by the Lord President, as the child was to be conceived naturally and only the Loom-born could inherit the Legacy of Rassilon; as a result, the Doctor's children were systemically culled. The Doctor managed to help Patience escape through the use of the Machine, a prototype TARDIS, after assuring that her daughter-in-law had given birth to a girl named Susan and promised that he would keep the child safely away from Gallifrey.

In "The Wedding of River Song", the Doctor marries recurring companion and love interest River Song. Comments by both River and the Doctor in the seventh series, particularly in "The Angels Take Manhattan", confirmed that they were married; in "The Name of the Doctor", the Doctor refers to her as his "wife" after seeing a grave stone with her name on it, after initially answering "yes" when Clara asks if she was an "ex".

In "The End of Time", the Tenth Doctor mentions marrying Queen Elizabeth I and implies that they had sex, stating: "her nickname is no longer [the Virgin Queen]...". The joke continues in "The Beast Below", featuring future British monarch Queen Elizabeth X or Liz Ten, and the marriage is finally shown in "The Day of the Doctor" during an adventure with Zygons. In the 2010 Christmas special, "A Christmas Carol", the Eleventh Doctor accidentally marries Marilyn Monroe but later questions the authenticity of the chapel in which they were married.

=== An Adventure in Time and Space ===
An adventurous scientist, the Doctor usually solves problems with his wits rather than with force. With the exception of his sonic screwdriver (which cannot kill, wound or maim), the Doctor detests weapons and uses violence only as a last resort. According to the alien villain Chedaki in the episode The Android Invasion, "his entire history is one of opposition to conquest".

As a time traveller, the Doctor has been present at, or directly involved in, countless major historical events on the planet Earth and elsewhere – sometimes more than once. In the 2005 series premiere, "Rose", it is revealed that the Ninth Doctor was instrumental in preventing a family from boarding the Titanic prior to her fateful voyage. In "The End of the World", the Doctor recalls having been on board and surviving the Titanic's sinking to find himself "clinging to an iceberg". The Fourth Doctor mentioned this event in Robot and The Invasion of Time, where he insists that the sinking was not his fault; the Seventh Doctor became involved in the sinking when tracking an alien entity in the novel The Left-Handed Hummingbird. The Doctor has also encountered many of Earth's historical figures.

It is his tendency for becoming "involved" with the universe – in direct violation of official Time Lord policy – that has caused the Doctor to be labelled a renegade by the Time Lords as stated in The War Games. However, the Doctor's actions are largely tolerated as he saved Gallifrey and the universe several times. The Time Lords are partial to sending him on missions when deniability or expendability is needed, implied to have begun after his capture during The War Games and witnessed further in later stories, the Time Lords directing the Doctor and/or the TARDIS to specific locations in Colony in Space, The Curse of Peladon, The Mutants, Genesis of the Daleks, The Brain of Morbius and Attack of the Cybermen. The Doctor's standing in Time Lord society has waxed and waned over the years, from being a hunted man who was eventually punished with a forced regeneration and an exile sentence on Earth, to being appointed Lord President of the High Council. He does not assume the office for very long, fleeing Gallifrey after his appointment rather than accepting the limitations on his freedom that the role would place on him ("The Five Doctors"), and is eventually deposed in absentia (The Trial of a Time Lord). By the time of his twelfth incarnation, he is regarded by many Gallifreyans as a war hero, "the man who won the Time War" ("Hell Bent").

=== The Time War ===
In the first series of the 2005 revival, writer Russell T Davies introduced the concept of the Time War to streamline the Doctor's backstory for new viewers of the show. It was a war across all of time and space which ended when the Doctor presumably destroyed both the Time Lords and the Daleks. The Doctor's remorse for his actions in his Ninth, Tenth and Eleventh incarnations is a key part of his characterisation throughout the revival. The Time War happened between the 1996 television movie and 2005 opening episode "Rose" according to the show's internal chronology, although the events of past serials such as Genesis of the Daleks have been retroactively attributed to the Time War. It was never shown on-screen until "The End of Time", which was both Davies's last story as head writer and producer and David Tennant's last regular story as the Tenth Doctor. This episode featured brief views of Gallifrey and the Time Lords on the last day of the Time War.

The 2013 mini-episode "The Night of the Doctor", released as a prelude to the 50th anniversary special, featured Paul McGann reprising his role as the Eighth Doctor and was set during the Last Great Time War, albeit much earlier than during "The End of Time". The mini-episode presented him as a conscientious objector to the war who regenerated under controlled circumstances into the War Doctor (John Hurt), a previously unseen incarnation created retroactively by Steven Moffat, Davies' successor as head writer, for the 50th anniversary special "The Day of the Doctor". The Tenth and Eleventh Doctors explained that Hurt's regeneration was not the Doctor because his actions during the Time War were a betrayal of the promise that name symbolized. "The Day of the Doctor" revisited the last day of the Time War after "The End of Time" and revealed that the interference of the future Doctors and future companion Clara Oswald caused the War Doctor to change his plan at the last moment. Ultimately, Gallifrey was hidden in a parallel dimension and the Daleks destroyed themselves in the ensuing crossfire; to all observers, it appeared as though the two races had been annihilated together. The unsynchronized timestreams caused the War Doctor to forget the specifics of his actions at this time. The Doctor remembered committing the apparent genocide during the lives of his ninth, tenth and eleventh incarnations up until the time of the Eleventh Doctor's present.

== Development ==
The episode title screen of the unaired pilot episode of Doctor Who.

The character of the Doctor was created by BBC Head of Drama, Sydney Newman. The first format document for the programme that was to become Doctor Who – then provisionally titled The Troubleshooters – was written in March 1963 by C. E. Webber, a staff writer who had been brought in to help develop the project. Webber's document contained a main character described as "The maturer man, 35–40, with some 'character twist'." Newman was not keen on this idea and – along with several other changes to Webber's initial format – created an alternative lead character named Dr Who, a crotchety older man piloting a stolen time machine, on the run from his own far-future world. No written record of Newman's conveyance of these ideas – believed to have taken place in April 1963 – exists, and the character of Dr Who first begins appearing in existing documentation from May of that year. It is possible that series co-creator Donald Wilson may have named the character; in a 1971 interview Wilson claimed to have come up with the series' title, and when this claim was put to Newman he did not dispute it.

The character was first portrayed by William Hartnell in 1963. At the programme's beginning, nothing at all is known of the Doctor: not even his name, the actual form of which remains a mystery. In the first serial, An Unearthly Child, two teachers from Coal Hill School in London, Barbara Wright and Ian Chesterton, become intrigued by one of their pupils, Susan Foreman, who exhibits high intelligence and unusually advanced knowledge. Trailing her to a junkyard at 76 Totter's Lane, they encounter a strange old man and hear Susan's voice coming from inside what appears to be a police box. Pushing their way inside, the two find that the exterior is camouflage for the dimensionally transcendental interior of the TARDIS. The old man, whom Susan calls "Grandfather", kidnaps Barbara and Ian to prevent them from telling anyone about the existence of the TARDIS, taking them on an adventure in time and space. The first Doctor, says cultural scholar John Paul Green, "explicitly positioned the Doctor as grandfather to his companion Susan". He wore long white hair and Edwardian costume, reflecting, Green says, a "definite sense of Englishness".

When Hartnell left the programme after three years due to ill health, the role was handed over to character actor Patrick Troughton. As of May 2025, official television productions have depicted seventeen distinct incarnations of the Doctor, including two retroactively inserted past Doctors. (Note: Following Hartnell's death in 1975, actor Richard Hurndall substituted in his role as the First Doctor in 1983's 20th-anniversary special, "The Five Doctors".) (Note: The War Doctor was introduced in "The Name of the Doctor" and follows Paul McGann's "Eighth Doctor" and precedes Christopher Eccleston's "Ninth Doctor" within the show's internal chronology.) The longest-lasting on-screen incarnation is the Fourth Doctor, played by Tom Baker for seven years. Within the narrative, these changes were explained as regeneration, a biological process which heals a Time Lord when their incarnation is about to die. Consequently, the Time Lord is given a wholly new body. In The Deadly Assassin, the concept of a regeneration limit is introduced, giving Time Lords a fixed number of twelve regenerations, meaning that every Time Lord had a total of thirteen incarnations including the original. The plot of "The Time of the Doctor" involves the Doctor receiving a new cycle of regenerations from the Time Lords before his expected demise, triggering the regeneration into the Twelfth Doctor, played by Peter Capaldi. (Note: The Eleventh Doctor (played by Matt Smith) revealed himself to be the final incarnation, owing to the existence of the War Doctor and the Tenth Doctor's partially aborted regeneration in "The Stolen Earth"/"Journey's End".)

The origins of the programme were explored in the docudrama An Adventure in Space and Time as part of the 50th-anniversary celebrations of Doctor Who, which starred David Bradley as William Hartnell.

== Physiology ==
Although Time Lords resemble humans, their physiology differs in key respects. Like other members of their race, the Doctor has two hearts (binary vascular system), a "respiratory bypass system" that allows the Doctor to go without air, an internal body temperature of 15–16 °C (60 °F) and occasionally exhibits a super-human level of stamina and the ability to absorb, withstand and expel large amounts of certain types of radiation. (The Tenth Doctor stated they used to play with Röntgen bricks in the nursery, after absorbing the radiation from an x-ray of significantly magnified power.) This ability seems to have limitations which have yet to be fully explained, as the Doctor is harmed by radiation in The Daleks, Planet of the Spiders and "The End of Time". The Doctor has withstood, with minimal damage, exposure to electricity deadly enough to kill a human (Terror of the Zygons, Genesis of the Daleks, "Aliens of London", "The Christmas Invasion", "The Idiot's Lantern", "Evolution of the Daleks" and spin-off audio Spare Parts). Certain stories imply that the Time Lord is resistant to cold temperatures ("42"). To counter extreme trauma, such as exposure to the poisonous fungus in The Seeds of Death and after being shot in Spearhead from Space, the Doctor can go into a self-induced coma until they recover. The Doctor's hypersensitive body and senses enable them to detect anomalies humans cannot, such as identifying alien species, blood type or chemical composition by taste and determining location or time period by sniffing the air. In "The Unicorn and the Wasp" (2008) he was able to sense the changes in his body's enzymes (i.e. cyanide poisoning) and expel the cyanide from his body by ingesting a concoction of ginger beer, protein foods and salts.

The Doctor has shown a resistance to temporal effects and has demonstrated telepathic ability, both the ability to mentally connect to other incarnations of themselves they have encountered ("The Five Doctors"), and an ability to enter into the memories of other individuals ("The Girl in the Fireplace"). The Doctor can apparently reverse this process, sharing their memory with another, as shown in "The Lodger". Some humans can enter the Doctor's memories after the Doctor enters theirs, as demonstrated by Madame de Pompadour (much to the Doctor's surprise) in "The Girl in the Fireplace", when she explains, "A door, once opened, may be stepped through in either direction." In "The Fires of Pompeii", the Doctor reveals that he is able to perceive the fabric of time, discerning "fixed points" and "points in flux" – moments when history must remain as it was originally versus moments when he can change or influence the original course of events, as well as all past, present and possible future events. However, in "Kill the Moon", the Twelfth Doctor claims that there are "grey areas", points in time for which he cannot see the outcome. Like many other alien species in the programme, the Doctor is able to sense when their own species is within proximity through an inherent telepathic connection.

The Doctor exhibits some weaknesses uncommon to humans. For example, according to The Mind of Evil (1971), a tablet of aspirin could kill him. In "Cold Blood", a process meant to decontaminate him of bacteria from the surface of Earth causes him intense pain, and he says it could have killed him if allowed to proceed to completion. In the Eighth Doctor Adventures novel The Adventuress of Henrietta Street, the Doctor's second heart was surgically removed, resulting in the loss of his abilities to metabolise drugs and go without air; these are restored when he begins to grow a new heart after his old one 'dies' (Camera Obscura).

In his final serial, the Second Doctor states that Time Lords can live forever, "barring accidents". When "accidents" do occur, Time Lords can usually regenerate into a new body. It is stated in The Deadly Assassin that Time Lords can only regenerate a total of twelve times, giving a theoretical final total of thirteen incarnations. However, The Doctor has a natural ability to regenerate an infinite number of times. It is possible to exceed this limit: in "The Five Doctors" the Time Lords offer the Master, who is inhabiting a Trakenite body after exhausting his original twelve regenerations, a new regeneration cycle as a reward for his help and cooperation, and at some point, during the Time War they resurrected him, with his new body having at least one regeneration of its own. Regeneration is apparently optional, as in "Last of the Time Lords" the Master refuses to regenerate despite the Tenth Doctor's pleading. In addition, there are ways of killing a Time Lord that do not permit regeneration; for example, more than once it has been implied that stopping both the Doctor's hearts simultaneously would accomplish this (as demonstrated in the Eleventh Doctor story "The Impossible Astronaut"). The Chancellery Guard (Gallifrey's equivalent of a police force) are armed with stasers, weapons capable of suppressing regeneration. In Death of the Doctor, a serial from spin-off programme The Sarah Jane Adventures, the Eleventh Doctor flippantly responds to Clyde Langer that he can regenerate "507" times; writer Russell T. Davies intended this line as a joke. Due to the retroactive creation of a numberless War Doctor and the Tenth Doctor's aborted regeneration in "The Stolen Earth"/"Journey's End", the Eleventh Doctor was the final incarnation in his natural cycle. The Time Lords used a crack in the universe to give him a new cycle consisting of an unknown number of regenerations in "The Time of the Doctor", triggering the regeneration into the Twelfth Doctor (Peter Capaldi). The Twelfth Doctor later claims to be uncertain he "won't keep regenerating forever" ("Kill the Moon"), and even Rassilon, the president of the Time Lords, expresses uncertainty about how many regenerations the Doctor has available to him.

Other skills include his mental communication with other Time Lords, in some cases over a galaxy's distance. His skill with hypnosis requires only a glance into the eyes to put the subject under a trance. The Doctor can read an entire book cover to cover in a second by thumb-flipping the pages before his eyes (City of Death, "Rose", "The Time of Angels"). Though medical skills he shows early in the programme are rudimentary, by Remembrance of the Daleks he can perform sophisticated medical diagnoses merely by touching someone's ear. He is an excellent cricket player (Black Orchid) and in "The Lodger" he proves to be a prodigiously talented footballer despite unfamiliarity with some of the game's basic rules. Though reluctant to engage in combat against living opponents, this is not for lack of skill; the Doctor is conversant with both real and fictitious styles of unarmed combat (most obviously the "Venusian Aikido" practised by the Third, Twelfth and Thirteenth Doctors), has won several sword fights against skilled opponents, and is able to make extremely difficult shots with firearms and, in The Face of Evil, with a crossbow. Thanks to exposure to many of history's greatest experts, including those from the future, the Doctor is a talented boxer, musician, organist, scientist and singer (able to shatter windows with his voice), and has a PhD in cheesemaking ("The God Complex").

== Casting (changing faces) ==
=== Lead role ===
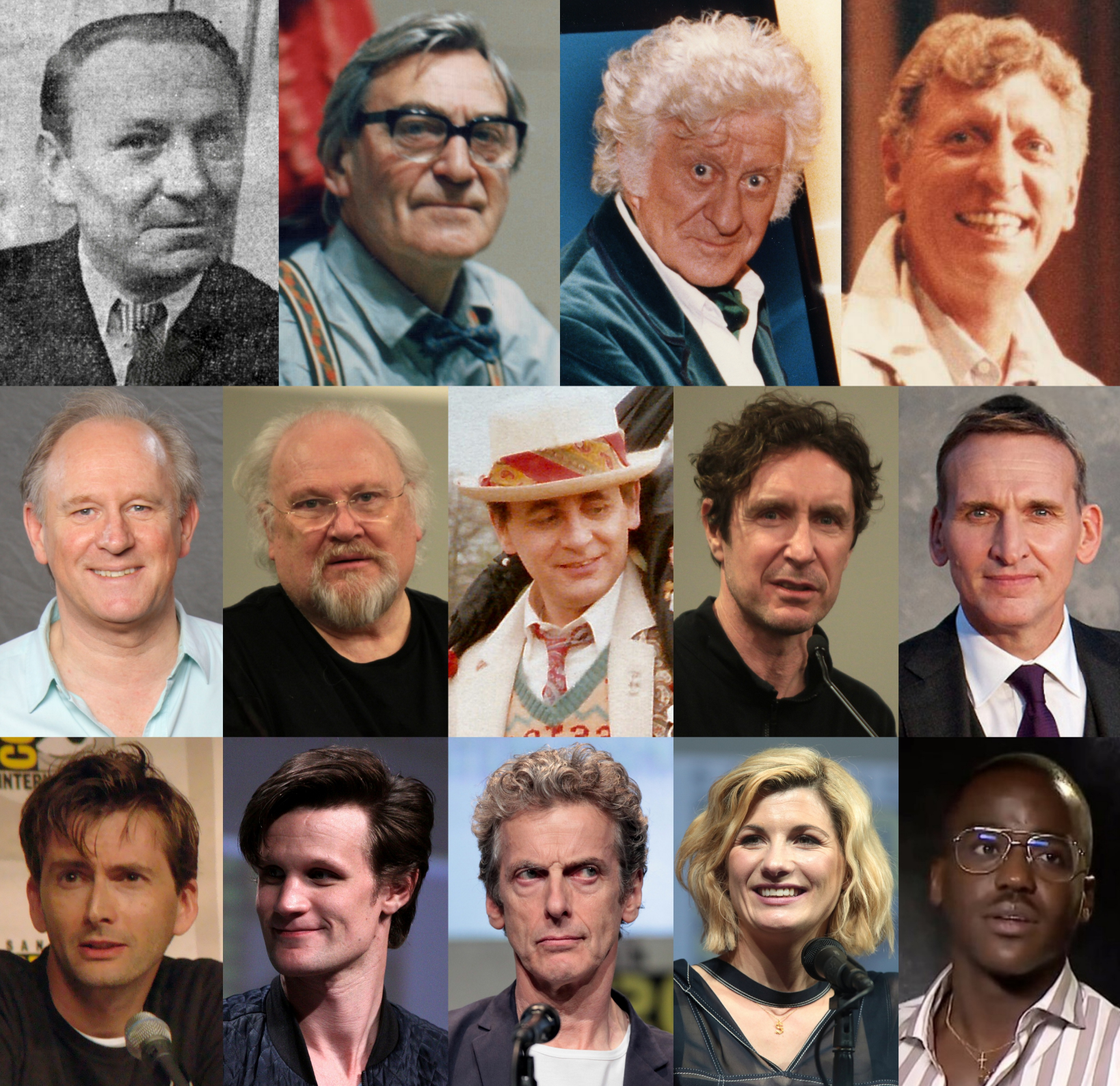
The actors who have played the Doctor as the lead role (Note: Photos of the actors, not necessarily during the period they portrayed the character)

The actors who have played the lead role of the Doctor to date in the programme, and the dates of their first and last regular television appearances in the role, are:

Actor	Incarnation	No. of series	No. of episodes	No. of stories	Tenure start		Tenure end	
Actor	Incarnation	No. of series	No. of episodes	No. of stories	Date	Age	Date	Age
William Hartnell	First Doctor	4	134	29	23 November 1963	55	29 October 1966	58
Patrick Troughton	Second Doctor	3	119	21	5 November 1966	46	21 June 1969	49
Jon Pertwee	Third Doctor	5	128	24	3 January 1970	50	8 June 1974	54
Tom Baker	Fourth Doctor	7	172	41	28 December 1974	40	21 March 1981	47
Peter Davison	Fifth Doctor	3	69	20	4 January 1982	30	16 March 1984	32
Colin Baker	Sixth Doctor	3	31	8	22 March 1984	40	6 December 1986	43
Sylvester McCoy	Seventh Doctor	3	42	12	7 September 1987	44	6 December 1989	46
Paul McGann	Eighth Doctor	—N/a	1	1	27 May 1996	36	27 May 1996 (Note: McGann reprised the character for the mini-episode "The Night of the Doctor", which was made available on BBC's Red Button service and iPlayer on 14 November 2013. McGann was 53 when he filmed the mini-episode.)	36
Christopher Eccleston	Ninth Doctor	1	13	10	26 March 2005	41	18 June 2005	41
David Tennant	Tenth Doctor	3	47	36	25 December 2005	34	1 January 2010	38
Matt Smith	Eleventh Doctor	3	44	39	3 April 2010	27	25 December 2013	31
Peter Capaldi	Twelfth Doctor	3	40	35	23 August 2014	56	25 December 2017	59
Jodie Whittaker	Thirteenth Doctor	3	31	24	7 October 2018	36	23 October 2022	40
David Tennant	Fourteenth Doctor	—N/a	3	3	25 November 2023	52	9 December 2023	52
Ncuti Gatwa	Fifteenth Doctor	2	18	16	25 December 2023	31	31 May 2025	32

With the need for the show to keep going with a new lead; a concept of regeneration was created. The Doctor's body would rebuild itself in a younger healthier and renewed form. The in universe explanation is that the Time Lords' have an ability to (after suffering illness, mortal injury or old age) repair all damage and rejuvenate. The change of face is a side effect, changing the Doctor's physical appearance and personality. This ability was not introduced until producers had to find a way to replace the ailing William Hartnell with Patrick Troughton and was not explicitly called "regeneration" until the third such instance, at the climax of Planet of the Spiders (1974). On screen, the transformation from Hartnell to Troughton was called a "renewal" and from Troughton to Pertwee a "change of appearance".

The Second Doctor was intended to be a literally younger version of the First; biological time would turn back, and several hundred years would get taken off the Doctor's age, rejuvenating him. In practice, however, since the Doctor stated his age in the Second Doctor serial The Tomb of the Cybermen (1967), his age has been recorded progressively (see below). On most occasions, regeneration has seen a younger actor assume the role of the Doctor; the only exceptions to this are the introductions of the Third, Sixth, Twelfth and Fourteenth Doctors, although Steven Moffat initially intended to cast an actor in his mid-30s to 40s for the role of the Eleventh Doctor.

The 60th anniversary special episode "The Giggle" introduced a new twist on the regeneration concept called bi-generation, whereby a new Time Lord incarnation can be created by a new body emerging from and splitting off from the body of a previous incarnation. In the episode, the Fourteenth Doctor (David Tennant) underwent a bi-generation after being shot with UNIT's galvanic beam by the Toymaker (Neil Patrick Harris), leading to the Fifteenth Doctor (Ncuti Gatwa) effectively being birthed from his previous incarnation, while also allowing the previous incarnation to retain his physical form and exist independently, allowing him to settle down with Donna Noble, his best friend.

=== Others who have played the character ===
In addition to the above-listed actors, others have played versions of the Doctor for the duration of particular storylines. Notably, John Hurt guest starred as the War Doctor in the closing moments of the 2013 episode "The Name of the Doctor", the webcast "The Night of the Doctor" and the 50th Anniversary episode "The Day of the Doctor". The War Doctor exists between those of McGann and Eccleston. Hurt was never the programme's lead actor; his Doctor was retroactively inserted into continuity for the programme's 50th anniversary, and was written so as not to disturb the ordinal naming of the established Ninth, Tenth and Eleventh Doctors. In the 1986 serial The Trial of a Time Lord, Michael Jayston played the Valeyard, an amalgamation of the Doctor's darker sides from between his twelfth and final incarnations. In the Series 12 episode "Fugitive of the Judoon", Jo Martin played a previously unknown incarnation of the Doctor, later confirmed to precede the First Doctor. The capacity for the Doctor to have other previously unknown regenerations prior to the First Doctor was introduced in "The Timeless Children" (2020), having previously been hinted at in the 1976 serial The Brain of Morbius. In that serial, we see images of eight previously unseen faces, intended to represent incarnations preceding the First Doctor. The Doctor's previous faces are portrayed by members of the Doctor Who crew who worked on this serial or the following serial, The Seeds of Doom: production unit manager George Gallaccio, script editor Robert Holmes, production assistant Graeme Harper, director Douglas Camfield, producer Philip Hinchcliffe, production assistant Christopher Baker, writer Robert Banks Stewart, and director Christopher Barry. Hinchcliffe stated, "We tried to get famous actors for the faces of the Doctor. But because no one would volunteer, we had to use backroom boys. And it is true to say that I attempted to imply that William Hartnell was not the first Doctor".

As William Hartnell had died in 1975, two other actors reprised the First Doctor in later years. Richard Hurndall appeared as the First Doctor in "The Five Doctors" (1983). David Bradley played that incarnation in three episodes, including "Twice Upon a Time" (2017) and "The Power of the Doctor" (2022), helping the Twelfth Doctor and Thirteenth Doctor, respectively, regenerate into their next incarnations.

At the conclusion of "The Reality War" (2025), the Fifteenth Doctor ostensibly regenerated into a form played by Billie Piper, who had previously played companion Rose Tyler. Piper's official role remains undisclosed, with her character not identified in the episode's closing credits, which only stated "Introducing Billie Piper", though some sources have speculated that she could possibly be the sixteenth incarnation of the Doctor.

=== Transitions (regeneration) ===
The Tenth Doctor's explosive regeneration into the Eleventh Doctor.

Each regeneration to date has been worked into the continuing story, and most regenerations have been portrayed on-screen, in a handing over of the role. A Time Lord can generally regenerate twelve times for a total of thirteen incarnations, though the Doctor was granted additional regenerations when reaching that limit. The following list details the manner of each transition between incarnations:

- First Doctor (William Hartnell): Succumbed to old age after being weakened by the Cybermen's draining of Earth's energy before being "renewed" by the TARDIS in The Tenth Planet (1966). He briefly stalled the process before embracing regeneration as seen in "Twice Upon a Time" (2017).
- Second Doctor (Patrick Troughton): A forced "change in appearance" (and exile to Earth) by the Time Lords as punishment for breaching their law of non-intervention in The War Games (1969). (Note: Various spinoff media, including the novel World Game (2005) and the audio series Beyond War Games (2022), suggest that the Second Doctor did not regenerate at this time and had further adventures prior to his exile to Earth, including the events of "The Three Doctors" (1973) and "The Five Doctors" (1983). This has never been confirmed in the TV series.)
- Third Doctor (Jon Pertwee): Succumbed to radiation poisoning from the planet Metebelis III in Planet of the Spiders (1974). (Note: The regeneration required "a little push" from fellow Time Lord K'anpo Rimpoche before it could proceed.)
- Fourth Doctor (Tom Baker): Mortally injured after falling from the Pharos Project telescope and merged with a mysterious "in-between" incarnation named "The Watcher" in Logopolis (1981).
- Fifth Doctor (Peter Davison): Succumbed to spectrox poisoning, contracted near the start of The Caves of Androzani (1984).
- Sixth Doctor (Colin Baker): Mortally injured when the Rani attacked and crash-landed the TARDIS on the planet Lakertya at the start of Time and the Rani (1987). (Note: Colin Baker did not appear in the regeneration scene from Time and the Rani, as he declined to participate. Instead, Sylvester McCoy was seen briefly, wearing a blond wig, with his facial features obscured by a video effect before he regenerated into the Seventh Doctor. Baker later voiced the character in the 2015 audio drama The Sixth Doctor: The Last Adventure, which served to explain the cause of his regeneration; the Doctor deliberately drew himself towards Lakertya to be poisoned by its radiation, which prevented the Valeyard from taking over existence. This supersedes a previous account of his regeneration as depicted in the Past Doctor Adventures spin-off novel Spiral Scratch, in which the Sixth Doctor was already mortally wounded in a battle with a Lamprey prior to the Rani's tractor beam ensnaring the TARDIS.)
- Seventh Doctor (Sylvester McCoy): Shot by a San Francisco street gang and killed during exploratory heart surgery by a doctor unfamiliar with Time Lord physiology; surgical anaesthetic stalled his regeneration in the 1996 television film.
- Eighth Doctor (Paul McGann): Killed after crash-landing a gunship on the planet Karn in "The Night of the Doctor" (2013). There, the Sisterhood of Karn revived the Doctor and provided an elixir that allowed him to choose the outcome of his next regeneration.
- War Doctor (John Hurt): Succumbed to old age in "The Day of the Doctor" (2013), after spending the duration of his lifetime fighting in the Time War.
- Ninth Doctor (Christopher Eccleston): Absorbed Time Vortex energy from Rose Tyler, who had absorbed it from the TARDIS, resulting in cellular degeneration in "The Parting of the Ways" (2005).
- Tenth Doctor (David Tennant): Having aborted one regeneration after being shot by a Dalek gun in "The Stolen Earth" (2008), by healing himself before directing the remaining regeneration energy into his severed hand in "Journey's End" (2008), he later succumbs to radiation poisoning incurred while saving Wilfred Mott in "The End of Time" (2009–10).
- Eleventh Doctor (Matt Smith): After centuries defending the planet Trenzalore in his final body, the Time Lords grant the Doctor a new regeneration cycle in "The Time of the Doctor" (2013) just before he dies of old age.
- Twelfth Doctor (Peter Capaldi): Electrocuted by a Mondasian Cyberman aboard a colony ship, and later further injured by an explosion, in "The Doctor Falls" (2017). Initially refusing to change again, the Doctor finally embraces regeneration at the end of "Twice Upon a Time" (2017).
- Thirteenth Doctor (Jodie Whittaker): Attacked by the Master with Qurunx energy in "The Power of the Doctor" (2022).
- Fourteenth Doctor (David Tennant): Attacked by the Toymaker with UNIT's galvanic beam weapon in "The Giggle" (2023). This incarnation still lives and exists independently of the Fifteenth Doctor following a "bi-generation".
- Fifteenth Doctor (Ncuti Gatwa): Triggered his own regeneration to provide enough energy to shift reality and preserve the life of Belinda Chandra's daughter, Poppy, in "The Reality War" (2025).

It was established in The Deadly Assassin (1976) that a Time Lord can regenerate twelve times before permanently dying – a total of thirteen incarnations. The series depicted exceptions to the rule, such as "The Five Doctors" showing that the Time Lords can circumvent the cap of 12 regenerations in total by giving a Time Lord extra regenerations. While many of the previous regeneration sequences were unique, the Doctor's regenerations of the revived programme were similar with each transition being an explosion of energy in a particularly violent fashion. This is seen from the Tenth Doctor's regeneration damaging the TARDIS, to the Eleventh Doctor's causing a shock wave that devastated the countryside while obliterating a Dalek mother-ship.

In "The Christmas Invasion" (2005), it was stated the regenerative cycle creates a large amount of residual regeneration energy that suffuses the Time Lord's body. As demonstrated by the Tenth Doctor for the first time in that story, in the first fifteen hours of regeneration this energy is enough to even rapidly regrow a severed hand.

In the case of the Doctor, his regenerations are usually a result of a previous incarnation sustaining mortal injury, though he can regenerate from old age and was once forced to regenerate by the Time Lords. A common side effect the Doctor frequently experiences is a period of physical and psychological instability. The Fourth Doctor described it as "a new body is like a new house - takes a little bit of time to settle in". The Second Doctor experiences crippling pain after his first regeneration (in The Power of the Daleks, 1966), while the Third Doctor collapses outside the TARDIS following his regeneration (in Spearhead from Space, 1970). The Fourth Doctor started rambling random phrases and possessed a higher than usual strength; he could cut a brick in half merely with his hand (in Robot, 1974). The Fifth Doctor begins reverting to his previous personalities (in Castrovalva, 1982), and the Sixth Doctor experiences extreme paranoia, flying into a murderous rage and nearly killing his companion (in The Twin Dilemma, 1984). The Seventh Doctor experienced partial amnesia both as a result of post-regeneration trauma and because the Rani injects him with an amnesia-inducing drug (in Time and the Rani, 1987). The Eighth Doctor experienced full amnesia as a result of both post-regeneration trauma and due to the anaesthetics affecting his physiology (in the 1996 television film); uniquely, the Doctor was "not alive" at the time of this regeneration. The regeneration from the Ninth to the Tenth Doctor sees the Doctor experiencing sudden spasms and great pain (in Children in Need special, 2005), and later being unconscious for most of the next fifteen hours (in The Christmas Invasion). The experience was traumatic enough to cause one of his hearts to temporarily stop beating. The regeneration from the Tenth to the Eleventh Doctor caused the Doctor to experience strange food cravings, only to be disgusted by them upon actually trying them (in The Eleventh Hour, 2010). The Twelfth Doctor forgot how to fly the TARDIS (as well as the name of the TARDIS) right after the regeneration process (in The Time of the Doctor, 2013), and the Thirteenth Doctor experienced partial amnesia as a result of post-regeneration trauma from falling from the TARDIS to the carriage ceiling of a train (The Woman Who Fell to Earth, 2018). The Brain of Morbius implies that Time Lords other than the Doctor may experience difficult regenerations, since the Sisterhood of Karn had been supplying them with an "elixir of life" that could assist the process. In "The Night of the Doctor", the Sisterhood tell the Eighth Doctor they can provide elixirs to give rise to non-random regenerations, allowing the Doctor to specify either a physical type or personality.

The TARDIS appears to aid in the regenerative process, with few occasions where the Doctor regenerates outside it. Three of these are initiated by Time Lords: one forced on him before banishment to Earth (The War Games), one requiring a Time Lord to give the Doctor's cells a "little push" to start the process (Planet of the Spiders), and one needing the Watcher – which the Doctor's travelling companions believed to be some version of the Doctor himself (Logopolis). The Eighth Doctor's regeneration apparently occurred a few hours after he had actually "died", leaving him with temporary amnesia due to his body's adverse reaction to earth medicines.

In the BBC Series 4 FAQ, writer Russell T Davies suggested that as the Time Lords were killed in the time war, the Doctor could be able to regenerate indefinitely. In "Journey's End", the Tenth Doctor manages to avert his own regeneration by using some of the energy to heal himself, then channeling the remaining energy into his severed hand, thus retaining his appearance and personality. That regenerative energy was a key point in a "human–Time Lord biological metacrisis" inadvertently caused by Donna Noble that creates the Meta-Crisis Doctor while she obtains a Time Lord intellect. In "The Time of the Doctor" the Eleventh Doctor revealed that it was considered a full regeneration; he just kept the same face due to "vanity issues", and that he was now in his final life (given that the Tenth Doctor counted as two regenerations and the revelation of the existence of the War Doctor, this made a total of 12 regenerations). In the same episode, the Doctor is given a new cycle of regenerations by the Time Lords, allowing him to regenerate for the thirteenth time into the Twelfth Doctor, with the Twelfth Doctor ("Kill the Moon") and Rassilon ("Hell Bent") each expressing uncertainty about how many regenerations the Doctor now has.

=== Reprising the role (multi-Doctor stories) ===
On a few occasions, previous actors to have played the Doctor have returned to the role, usually guest-starring with the incumbent:

- William Hartnell and Patrick Troughton with Jon Pertwee in The Three Doctors, the 10th anniversary special. Originally, Hartnell's role had been intended to be more extensive, but his health had deteriorated to the extent that he could only make a limited appearance which would be his last television role.
- Troughton and Pertwee with Peter Davison in "The Five Doctors", the 20th anniversary special, with newly released footage of Tom Baker and another actor, Richard Hurndall, standing in for the deceased Hartnell. Archive footage of Hartnell taken from The Dalek Invasion of Earth introduced the story. Baker declined to appear, feeling that the role came too soon after he had left the programme (a decision he later said he regretted) and the narrative was reworked to use clips from Shada, an intended six-part story from the Fourth Doctor's era that was never completed due to industrial strikes. A waxwork dummy of Baker from Madame Tussauds was used in publicity photographs.
- Troughton with Colin Baker in The Two Doctors. This story is notable for not being produced either to celebrate the programme's anniversary or as a Children in Need production.
- Pertwee, Tom Baker, Davison and Colin Baker with Sylvester McCoy in Dimensions in Time, the programme's 30th anniversary charity special in aid of Children in Need in 1993. Hartnell and Troughton were represented by rubber heads, because both actors had died by then. Except for these mannequin versions of Hartnell and Troughton, no two Doctors are shown on screen at the same time. (This story was a crossover with EastEnders).
- McCoy returned to film early segments of Doctor Who, the TV film featuring the Seventh Doctor's regeneration scene.
- Davison with David Tennant in the 2007 Children in Need mini-episode "Time Crash".
- Paul McGann returned to film the Eighth Doctor's final moments and regeneration in the 2013 mini-episode "The Night of the Doctor". None of the other Doctors appeared in this mini-episode, although archive footage of John Hurt appears briefly in the closing scene, for which he provided original audio.
- Tennant with Matt Smith in "The Day of the Doctor", the 50th anniversary special. Hurt made his first official appearance as a newly revealed incarnation of the Doctor. Tom Baker made a cameo appearance in the special as the curator of the National Gallery. He was implied to be a future Doctor who was "revisiting" an "old favourite" face, but the script never explicitly states this. Dialogue states that "perhaps it doesn't matter either way" whether the Doctor and Curator are the same individual. Archive footage of Hartnell, Troughton, Pertwee, Tom Baker, Davison, Colin Baker, McCoy, McGann and Christopher Eccleston, with new audio from voice actor John Guilor impersonating Hartnell, was used to represent the other Doctors. Additionally, a brief appearance by Peter Capaldi, who was due to take over as the Doctor, was inserted, to represent all then-thirteen incarnations of the Doctor.
- Smith appeared in "Deep Breath", the first full episode after his regeneration. He made a telephone call to his future to reassure Clara Oswald and urge her to accept his successor, portrayed by Capaldi. The scene was filmed on the set of "The Time of the Doctor", Smith's last story as the incumbent Doctor, for the eighth series.
- Davison, Colin Baker, McCoy and McGann with Jodie Whittaker in "The Power of the Doctor". They are seen as spirit forms. Davison and McCoy also appeared as holographic versions of their incarnations, when the Thirteenth Doctor talks to Tegan Jovanka and Ace. David Bradley reprised his role as the First Doctor from the episodes "The Doctor Falls" and "Twice Upon a Time" in this episode.
- Tennant appeared as the Fourteenth Doctor in "The Power of the Doctor" and the 60th anniversary specials.
- Whittaker appeared in "The Reality War".

In addition to the above, Pertwee, Tom Baker and Colin Baker reprised their roles in audio dramas on the BBC Radio and Bradley, Tom Baker, Davison, Colin Baker, Jayston, McCoy, McGann, Hurt, Eccleston, Tennant, Whittaker and Martin have reprised the role in audio dramas from Big Finish Productions.

Due to time travel, it is possible for the Doctor's various incarnations to encounter and interact with each other, although supposedly prohibited by the First Law of Time (as stated in The Three Doctors) or permitted only in the "gravest of emergencies" ("The Five Doctors"). In the 1963–1989 television programme, such encounters were seen on three occasions: in The Three Doctors (1972), "The Five Doctors" (1983) and The Two Doctors (1985). In Day of the Daleks (1972), the Third Doctor and Jo Grant very briefly met their future selves due to a glitch during a temporal experiment (the serial was supposed to end with the same scene depicted from the perspective of the "other" Doctor and Jo, but was excised because it was anticlimactic). In "Father's Day" (2005), the Ninth Doctor and Rose observed but did not interact with past versions of themselves; when Rose changed history, the earlier selves – after momentarily noticing Rose running past – vanished and a temporal paradox was created that attracted the extra-dimensional Reapers. The Tenth and Fifth Doctors met in the TARDIS in the mini-episode "Time Crash", which aired on 16 November 2007 as part of the BBC's annual Children in Need appeal. This marks the first time the Doctor has met a previous incarnation since the programme's revival. Although the scene aired outside the programme itself, it was established as taking place between the events of "Last of the Time Lords" and "Voyage of the Damned".

In the Virgin New Adventures, the Seventh Doctor is shown briefly interacting with a man who may be the Third Doctor in the Sherlock Holmes crossover novel All-Consuming Fire, but the scene is narrated from the perspective of Dr. Watson and thus the other man is never expressly identified. The Virgin Missing Adventures novel Cold Fusion is a unique twist on the traditional multi-Doctor story as it focuses on the Fifth Doctor's adventures before he meets the Seventh, where normal stories treat the later Doctor as 'the' Doctor.

The BBC novel The Eight Doctors was written by respected Doctor Who writer Terrance Dicks, the same author who wrote "The Five Doctors". In it, he tries to reconcile the continuity errors of the 1996 movie, while having the Eighth Doctor meet and interact with each of his previous selves, although the Eighth Doctor visited each incarnation one at a time rather than all eight of them appearing in the same place. Later Eighth Doctor novel Interference – Book One sees the Eighth Doctor briefly meeting the Third, although this occasion results in the Doctor unwittingly changing his own history so that the Third Doctor will regenerate ahead of schedule (A change that is later 'reset' in the novel The Ancestor Cell thanks to the TARDIS taking action to preserve the original history). In the Past Doctor Adventures, the novel Heart of TARDIS features the Second and Fourth Doctors dealing with two different ends of the same crisis, with the Second Doctor trapped in a dimensional anomaly created by a government experiment and the Fourth recruited to stop the experiment destroying the world, but although they are at one point both in the Second Doctor's TARDIS, the Fourth Doctor and his companion hide on the opposite side of the console from his past self and the Second is never aware of his future self. In The Colony of Lies, the Second Doctor briefly interacts with the Seventh Doctor in a VR simulation, but it is unspecified if this is the actual Seventh Doctor or just a VR program he left to advise his past self. In Wolfsbane, like in Heart of TARDIS, the Fourth and Eighth Doctors deal with separate ends of the same crisis, the Eighth stopping the threat in November 1936 while the Fourth ties up loose ends in December of the same year, but the two incarnations never meet directly, and due to the Eighth Doctor's current amnesia none of the other characters realizes that the two Doctors are the same person.

Physical contact between two versions of the same person in the programme can lead to an energy discharge that shorts out the "time differential". This is apparently due to a (fictional) principle known as the Blinovitch Limitation Effect, and was seen when the past and future versions of Brigadier Lethbridge-Stewart touched hands in Mawdryn Undead. The Doctor's incarnations do not appear to suffer this effect when encountering each other and shaking hands. This has never been explained. An essay in the About Time episode guides by Lawrence Miles and Tat Wood suggests that Time Lords are somehow exempt from the effect by their very nature. Rose Tyler is seen holding an infant version of herself in "Father's Day", with no visible energy discharge, but the contact does allow the Reapers to enter the church in which the Doctor and several others are taking refuge. While doing a live commentary on the episode at the 2006 Bristol Comic Expo, episode author Paul Cornell said that this is supposed to be due to the Blinovitch Limitation Effect, even though it is not mentioned by name. He suggested that the lack of a spark may be down to the fact that the Time Lords were no longer around to manage anomalies.

In the 2006 episode "School Reunion", the Tenth Doctor and Sarah Jane Smith both seem to indicate in dialogue that they have not seen each other since her departure from the TARDIS in The Hand of Fear, although this contradicts their having met later during "The Five Doctors". In that story, she does not appear to realise that the Fifth Doctor is a later incarnation of the third and fourth Doctors with whom she had previously travelled. In "Time Crash", the Tenth Doctor remembers and reproduces what he saw himself do when he was the Fifth Doctor, a fact that seems to surprise the Fifth Doctor himself.

Russell T Davies has expressed a dislike for stories in which multiple incarnations of the Doctor meet, stating that he believes they focus more on the actors than on the story itself. In 2007, David Tennant showed enthusiasm for the idea of a multi-Doctor story but expressed doubts about the practicality of episodes involving multiple previous Doctors, given that three of the actors who played the character were deceased.

The temporarily human Doctor, John Smith, draws his dreams of past incarnations in "Human Nature". (Left hand page: Tenth and Ninth; Right hand page, left to right, top to bottom: Fourth, Third, Second, Seventh, Eighth, First, Sixth, Fifth)

Since the programme's revival, there have been five multi-Doctor stories: the Children in Need special "Time Crash", the 50th-anniversary special, "The Day of the Doctor", the 2017 Christmas special "Twice Upon A Time", the series 12 episode "Fugitive of the Judoon", and "The Reality War" (2025). Before that, the only references to past incarnations (from 1963 to 1996) have been in the aforementioned episode "School Reunion" (in which the Doctor acknowledges having regenerated "half a dozen times" since last seeing Sarah Jane) and in drawings that the Doctor (who has temporarily become human to hide from the Family Of Blood) makes based on dreams of his other life in the 2007 episode "Human Nature". Seen on screen are the First, Fifth, Sixth, Seventh and Eighth Doctors, but a fuller view briefly available on the BBC website depicted all ten incarnations. In the 2008 Christmas episode, "The Next Doctor", the Tenth Doctor discovers an info stamp originally held by the Cybermen, which includes images of all his past selves. This is a clear affirmation of his past, and that the (then) current incarnation was indeed the Tenth. This was reaffirmed in the episode "The Eleventh Hour", when the Doctor asks the Atraxi whether this planet is protected. The Atraxi then shows 10 images, one of each Doctor from the first to the tenth, with the eleventh walking through the image of the tenth at the end. This is confirmed in the episode "The Lodger", when the Doctor, explaining to Craig who and what he is, points at his face and says, "Eleventh".

Because each new Doctor is different from their previous incarnations, how their personalities interact varies when two or more different incarnations encounter each other. Time Crash featured Peter Davison returning as the Fifth Doctor. This event is explained as occurring due to the current Doctor having left his shields down when rebuilding the TARDIS following "Last of the Time Lords" and then accidentally crossing the Fifth Doctor's timeline, allowing the two TARDISes to merge. When the Tenth Doctor effortlessly averts the impending Belgium-sized hole in the Universe caused by this temporal anomaly, he reveals having known what to do because he saw himself do it as the Fifth Doctor and remembered. He goes on to tell the Fifth Doctor how fond he was of his incarnation and how he influences the current Doctor's personality. However, in their two meetings, the Second Doctor and Third Doctor had a degree of antagonism towards each other, with the patriarchal First Doctor critical of them both. During the Virgin New Adventures, the Seventh Doctor was occasionally at odds with his subconscious memory of his previous incarnation as his memory of his past self became increasingly associated with the Valeyard, his dark, future self, but he eventually accepted his dark side and 'reformed' his memory of his former self, although it was never established how the two Doctors would interact if they had met in person.

On many occasions the Eleventh Doctor has actually encountered himself from a different point in his timeline – in "The Big Bang", the mini-episodes "Space" and "Time" and "Last Night" – and in "Journey to the Centre of the TARDIS", at the end, the Doctor interacted with his past self to reset time. In all stories, multiple versions of the Eleventh Doctor from different timelines meet and carry on brief conversations. Additionally, the Eleventh Doctor encountered an artificial (though physically and mentally identical) copy of himself in "The Almost People"; fought against "Mister Clever", an artificial personality generated out of his own by the Cybermen in "Nightmare in Silver"; and was pitted against "The Dream Lord", a manifestation of his self-loathing and anger, in "Amy's Choice".

Later, the Eleventh Doctor entered his own timeline in "The Name of the Doctor" to rescue his companion Clara Oswald, and while there observed a past incarnation portrayed by John Hurt, one whose actions caused him to be unworthy of the name "Doctor" and viewed as shameful by his future selves. In the 50th anniversary special, "The Day of the Doctor", the Eleventh Doctor encounters both the Tenth Doctor and the War Doctor (played by John Hurt). The Tenth and Eleventh Doctors are generally amicable towards each other, despite bickering, although the War Doctor treats them both as behaving too childishly. Despite this, he does come to admire both of his future incarnations, working together with them and eventually choosing to go through with the act of destroying Gallifrey because he knows it will help them become what they are. The Tenth and Eleventh are initially leery of the War Doctor, the Eleventh describing him as the "one life I have tried very hard to forget". However, both of them later recognise that the War Doctor followed what seemed to be the only course open to him, and are even willing to help him carry it out so that he won't have to suffer the guilt alone. Fortunately, with influence from the Moment – a sentient Time Lord weapon that brought about their meeting – the three are able to stumble upon an alternative: sending Gallifrey into a pocket universe, making it seem as though it has been destroyed. The three are then joined by the other nine previous Doctors and the future Twelfth Doctor (Peter Capaldi) in this act (the War, Tenth and Eleventh Doctors having evidently contacted them off-screen). The Eleventh Doctor is shown to have memories of these events but only recalls them after they have begun. This is explained in dialogue as an instability in the timeline, which causes the War and Tenth Doctors to forget their meeting, thus maintaining the continuity in which the Doctors from the War Doctor onwards believe themselves to have destroyed Gallifrey.

The Thirteenth Doctor meets a previously unknown incarnation of the Doctor portrayed by Jo Martin in "Fugitive of the Judoon". It is implied in "The Timeless Children" that Martin's Doctor was a previous incarnation that had been erased from the Doctor's memory by the Division.

=== On-screen credits ===
In the early years of the franchise, the character was credited as "Doctor Who" or "Dr Who", up to the final story of season 18, Logopolis (1981), which was the last story featuring Tom Baker as the then-incumbent Fourth Doctor. Beginning with the debut of Peter Davison as the Fifth Doctor in Castrovalva (1982), the character was credited as "The Doctor", which he had always been called in-universe since the tenure of William Hartnell. This credit remained from season 19 to season 26. In the television movie, the trend was continued, with Paul McGann's debuting Eighth Doctor credited as "The Doctor" and Sylvester McCoy's out-going Seventh Doctor as "The Old Doctor". The 2005 resurrection of the programme credited Christopher Eccleston — playing the Ninth Doctor — as "Doctor Who" again in series 1. "The Parting of the Ways", featuring the Ninth Doctor's regeneration into the Tenth Doctor (David Tennant), credits Tennant as "Doctor Who". The credit reverted to "The Doctor" for 2005's Christmas special "The Christmas Invasion" and all subsequent stories at Tennant's request. All subsequent actors to portray the role have continued to be credited as "The Doctor".

John Hurt plays a mysterious past incarnation of the Doctor in the 50th anniversary special "The Day of the Doctor", with minor roles in "The Name of the Doctor" and mini-episode "The Night of the Doctor", created as a "mayfly Doctor" by Steven Moffat. In the television episodes, he is credited as "The Doctor", but he is introduced as "The War Doctor" in "The Night of the Doctor". The end of "The Name of the Doctor" closes with text superimposed over footage of Hurt introducing him, pictured to the left, which was unprecedented for the show. In "The Day of the Doctor", Hurt appears in a "multi-Doctor" special alongside Matt Smith and David Tennant as the Eleventh and Tenth Doctors, respectively. The three are collectively credited as "The Doctor" alongside Christopher Eccleston, Paul McGann, Sylvester McCoy, Colin Baker, Peter Davison, Tom Baker, Jon Pertwee, Patrick Troughton and William Hartnell (although the latter nine appeared only through the reuse of archive footage). Tom Baker also appears in an uncredited part as "the Curator", an ambiguously different character who resembles the Fourth Doctor. A voice actor, John Guilor, recorded a line of audio impersonating the First Doctor, for which he was credited as "Voice Over Artist".

In other multi-Doctor stories, the multiple actors are all credited as "The Doctor", the exception being The Three Doctors (1972–1973), which credited William Hartnell, Patrick Troughton and Jon Pertwee as "Doctor Who" as the 1972 serial preceded the practice of crediting the character as "The Doctor". In "Human Nature" (2007), the plot involves the Tenth Doctor altering his biology and becoming a human to avoid detection. As a human, he takes the name "John Smith". David Tennant is credited as "The Doctor/Smith" for the episode, although the two-parter's concluding episode, "The Family of Blood" (2007), credits him simply as "The Doctor".

== Mentality ==
=== Name ===
In the first episode, the Doctor's granddaughter Susan goes by the surname "Foreman", and the junkyard in which Barbara and Ian find him bears the sign "I.M. Foreman". When addressed by Ian with this name, the Doctor responds, "Eh? Doctor who? What's he talking about?" Ian realises that "Foreman" is not the Doctor's name, when Barbara addresses the Doctor as "Doctor Foreman"; Ian asks Barbara, "That's not his name. Who is he? Doctor who?" In an ultimately unused idea from documents written at the programme's inception, Barbara and Ian would have subsequently referred to the Doctor as "Doctor Who", given their not knowing his name.

Throughout both the classic and revived programme, a running joke is that when the Doctor is introduced as just the Doctor, characters reply "Doctor who?" Another variation is "Doctor what?"

The story arc running throughout the tenure of the Eleventh Doctor involved the oldest question in the universe, revealed in "The Wedding of River Song" to be "Doctor who?", giving the phrase in-universe significance. In "The Name of the Doctor", the Doctor's real name was revealed to be the password used to enter the Doctor's tomb following his death on the planet Trenzalore. The story arc was resolved in "The Time of the Doctor", wherein it was revealed that the question had been projected by the Time Lords across all of time and space through a "crack in the skin of the universe" as a means of contacting the Doctor and seeing whether it was safe to leave the parallel universe in which their planet, Gallifrey, had been left following the events of "The Day of the Doctor". This arc was penned by Steven Moffat, who has been exploring the significance of the Doctor's name in his episodes since 2006's "The Girl in the Fireplace", in which historical figure Madame de Pompadour reads the Doctor's mind and remarks, "Doctor who? It's more than just a secret, isn't it?" According to the in-vision commentary on the DVD release, David Tennant had to inform actress Sophia Myles (who played Madame de Pompadour) that she was not, in fact, revealing the Doctor's surname as she believed was the intent of the dialogue. The 2011 mid-series finale "A Good Man Goes to War", also written by Moffat, suggested through the character of River Song that the Doctor's travels had influenced the etymology of the word "doctor", perverting its meaning on some worlds from "wise man" or "healer" to "great warrior". In "The End of Time" (2009–2010) it is mentioned that after he smote a demon in the 13th century, the residents of a convent called the Doctor the "sainted physician".

This was proposed by Moffat on Usenet 16 years before "A Good Man Goes to War":

Here's a particularly stupid theory. If we take "The Doctor" to be the Doctor's name — even if it is in the form of a title no doubt meaning something deep and Gallifreyan — perhaps our earthly use of the word "doctor" meaning healer or wise man is direct result of the Doctor's multiple interventions in our history as a healer and wise man. In other words, we got it from him. This is a very silly idea and I'm consequently rather proud of it.

The anonymity of the Doctor is the theme of series 7 of the revived programme. After faking his death, the Doctor erases himself from the various databases of the universe. In "Asylum of the Daleks", a "time splinter" of future companion Clara Oswald using the name Oswin wipes all knowledge of the Doctor from the Daleks' collective memory. This knowledge is regained when the Daleks conquer the Church of the Silence in "The Time of the Doctor" (2013). The Doctor is not present on Solomon's database in "Dinosaurs on a Spaceship" and holds a conversation about his newfound anonymity in "The Angels Take Manhattan" with River Song. In "Nightmare in Silver", the collective consciousness of the Cybermen informs the Doctor that he could be reconstructed from the "hole" — the missing records — that he has left behind, a mistake which the Doctor intends to rectify.

Few individuals are said to know the Doctor's true name. River Song whispered something to the Tenth Doctor to make him trust her during "Silence in the Library"/"Forest of the Dead", confirmed to have been his name towards the end of "Forest of the Dead". The events of "The Time of the Doctor" make it clear that his people, the Time Lords, know his true name, despite calling him by his chosen alias as "the Doctor" even in formal settings such as court.

Despite the common belief amongst some areas of the fanbase that the Doctor should never be referred to by the name of the series, "Doctor Who" is actually fairly often used as the character's name, most frequently in the spin-off material of the 1960s and 1970s, but occasionally also in the TV series itself. For example, in The Gunfighters the Doctor assumes the name of Doctor Caligari and subsequently responds to the question "Doctor who?" with "yes, quite right." In the serial The War Machines, the computer WOTAN commands that "Doctor Who is required", and his human agents also use the name. The Third Doctor's car, dubbed "Bessie", carried the plate WHO 1, the only ongoing reference to the "Doctor Who" enigma in the original programme. The Third Doctor later drove an outlandish vehicle called the "Whomobile" in publicity materials, but it is never referred to as such in the programme, being simply known as "the Doctor's car" (or "my car", as the Doctor puts it). The name "Doctor Who" is used in the title of the serial Doctor Who and the Silurians, but this was a captioning error rather than an in-story mention. The only other time this occurs is in the title of episode five of The Chase, which is titled "The Death of Doctor Who". In "World Enough and Time" (2017), the Doctor's old friend and archenemy the Master (as Missy) insists that the Doctor's real name is in fact Doctor Who and that he chose it himself; the Doctor tries to reassure his companion that Missy is joking, although later in the episode he self-identifies by that name.

In "Twice Upon a Time", before regeneration, the Twelfth Doctor states that no one would ever understand his name except for children, saying: "If their hearts are in the right place and the stars are too, children can hear your name." Peter Capaldi offered his own theory regarding the Doctor's real name, commenting: "I don't think human beings could even really say his name. But I think we might be able to hear it, at a certain frequency. If the stars are in the right place, and your heart's in the right place, you'll hear it."

On occasion, the Doctor uses other aliases, such as "John Smith". In the Fourth Doctor serial The Armageddon Factor, the Doctor runs into a former classmate of his named Drax. Drax calls the Doctor "Theta Sigma", or "Thete" for short, an alias which is clarified as being the Doctor's nickname at the Prydon Academy on Gallifrey in The Happiness Patrol and is mentioned again in the 2010 episode "The Pandorica Opens". In the 2015 episode "The Zygon Inversion", The Doctor tells Osgood that his first name is "Basil".

Doctor Who spin-off media have suggested that the character uses "the Doctor" because his actual name is impossible for humans to pronounce. For instance, the novel Vanderdeken's Children relates that the Doctor has already told Sam his real name, which is entirely alien and virtually unpronounceable. This is repeated by companion Peri Brown in the radio serial Slipback. The Faction Paradox encyclopaedia The Book of the War states that all renegades from the Homeworld/Gallifrey abandon their names to symbolise how they are leaving their culture. Similarly, the novel Lungbarrow reveals that the Doctor's name has been struck from the records of his family and therefore cannot be spoken.

=== Alias "The Doctor" ===
Quite apart from his name, why the Doctor uses the title "The Doctor" has never been fully explained on screen. The Doctor, at first, said that he was not a physician, often describing himself as a scientist or an engineer. However, he does occasionally show medical knowledge and has stated on separate occasions that he studied under Joseph Lister and Joseph Bell. In The Moonbase (1967), the Second Doctor mentions that he studied for a medical degree in Glasgow during the 19th century. The Fourth Doctor was awarded an honorary degree from St Cedd's College, Cambridge, in 1960. (Note: Stated by Wilkin who recognises the Fourth Doctor in Shada.) He has been mocked by his fellow Time Lords for adhering to such a "lowly" title as "Doctor", although, in The Armageddon Factor (1979), Drax congratulates him on achieving his doctorate, indicating it was at least a somewhat respectable title. In "The Girl in the Fireplace" (2006), he draws an analogy between the title and Madame de Pompadour's.

In The Mutants (1972), an official asks the Third Doctor if he is, in fact, a doctor, to which the Doctor replies "I am, yes"; when asked what he is qualified in, the Doctor replies, "Practically everything." The Fourth Doctor states that his companion, Harry Sullivan, is a doctor of medicine, while he is "a doctor of many things" (Revenge of the Cybermen, 1975). The Fifth Doctor claims to be a doctor "of everything" in Four to Doomsday (1982), and a message to the same effect is related from the Tenth Doctor in "Utopia" (2007). In "The Tsuranga Conundrum" (2018), the Thirteenth Doctor states that she is a doctor of "medicine, science, engineering, candyfloss, Lego, philosophy, music, problems, people, hope. Mostly hope." While talking with Harry in Robot (1974–1975), the Doctor says, "You may be a doctor, but I'm the Doctor. The definite article, you might say." In The Ark in Space (1975), aired later that year, the Doctor mentions that his doctorate is only honorary; the Tenth Doctor, however, considers the name to be his legitimate academic rank in "The Waters of Mars" (2009), describing his "name, rank and intention" as "The Doctor; doctor; fun." In an interview with The Age in 2003, Tom Baker mentioned that the Doctor is called so because he is "a doctor of time and relative dimension in space". Apart from being called a doctor of the TARDIS, he has been described as a "doctor of time travel".

The revived programme establishes that Time Lords invent their own names. In "The Sound of Drums" (2007), the Tenth Doctor remarks to the Master that they both chose their names, with the Master calling him sanctimonious for identifying himself as "the man who makes people better". The Eleventh Doctor, in "The Name of the Doctor", elaborates that the name is a promise to be: "Never cruel or cowardly. Never giving up and never giving in." This statement is repeated in the next episode, "The Day of the Doctor", by the War Doctor, the Tenth Doctor and the Eleventh Doctor collectively. By contrast, the Eleventh Doctor had earlier spoke of the War Doctor as being the man who broke that promise, being the one to fight in the Time War before learning the actual fate of the Time Lords. Since contradicted by the television series, the 2003 Telos novella Frayed by Tara Samms, set prior to the programme's first episode in 1963, presents the alternative explanation that the Doctor was given that name by medical staff on a foreign planet and liked it.

To make up for his lack of a practical name, the Doctor often relies upon convenient pseudonyms. In The Gunfighters (1966), the First Doctor uses the alias Dr. Caligari. In The Highlanders (1966–67), the Second Doctor assumes the name of "Doctor von Wer" (a German approximation of "Doctor Who"), and signs himself as "Dr. W" in The Underwater Menace. He similarly poses as "the Great Wizard Quiquaequod" in The Dæmons (qui, quae and quod being, respectively, the masculine, feminine and neuter Latin translation of the nominative form of who). The Master also utilised Latin translation in the same serial, posing as "Mr Magister". The Eighth Doctor's companion Grace briefly refers to him by the alias "Dr. Bowman" in the 1996 Doctor Who television movie.

In The Wheel in Space (1968), his companion Jamie McCrimmon, reading the name on medical equipment, tells the crew of the Wheel that the Doctor's name is "John Smith". The Doctor subsequently adopts this alias numerous times over the course of the programme, sometimes prefixing the title "Doctor" to it. He also calls himself "Doctor John Smith" when pressed for a name by a German officer in The War Games (1969).

In the audio adventure, The Sirens of Time (1999), when the Fifth Doctor is asked his name, this conversation ensues:

"I'm the Doctor."
"Doctor? That's a profession, not a name."
"It's all I have."

To his greatest enemies, the Daleks, the Doctor is known as the Ka Faraq Gatri, the "Enemy of the Daleks", the "Bringer of Darkness", or "Destroyer of Worlds". This is first mentioned in the 1990 novelisation of Remembrance of the Daleks by Ben Aaronovitch and subsequently taken up in the spin-off media, particularly the Virgin New Adventures books and the Doctor Who Magazine comic strip. Davros uses the title "Destroyer of Worlds" to describe the Doctor in "Journey's End" (2008). In the Virgin New Adventures novel Love and War, the Doctor is referred to as "The Oncoming Storm" by the Draconians (whose word for it is "Karshtakavaar"); according to the episode "The Parting of the Ways" (2005), the same title is used by the Daleks. The Doctor refers to himself as "The Oncoming Storm" in "The Lodger" (2010). In "Asylum of the Daleks" (2012), it is stated that Daleks refer to the Doctor as "The Predator". The Virgin New Adventure Zamper (1995) establishes that the Chelonians refer to him as "Interfering Idiot."

The programme has occasionally toyed with the Doctor's identity (or lack thereof). In the first part of The Mysterious Planet (1986), the Doctor suggests writing a thesis on "Ancient Life on Ravolox, by Doctor...", but is interrupted by his companion Peri. In The Armageddon Factor, the Time Lord Drax addresses the Fourth Doctor as "Thete", short for "Theta Sigma". Later, in The Happiness Patrol (1988), this was clarified as a nickname from the Doctor's university days; he is called by this name again in the Paul Cornell novel Goth Opera. In Remembrance of the Daleks, the Seventh Doctor produces a calling card with a series of pseudo-Greek letters inscribed on it (as well as a stylised question mark). This may be a reference to The Making of Doctor Who (1972), by Terrance Dicks and Malcolm Hulke, which claims that the Doctor's true name is a string of Greek letters and mathematical symbols.

The question mark motif was common throughout the 1980s, in part as a branding attempt. Beginning with season eighteen, the Fourth, Fifth, Sixth and Seventh Doctors all sported costumes with a red question mark motif (usually on the shirt collars, except for the Seventh Doctor — it appeared on his pullover and in the shape of his umbrella handle). In the 1978 serial The Invasion of Time, the Fourth Doctor is asked to sign a document; although the signature itself is not directly seen on screen, his hand movements clearly indicate that he signs it with a question mark. A similar scene occurs with the Seventh Doctor in Remembrance of the Daleks.

=== Personality ===
While the Doctor remains essentially the same person throughout their regenerations, each actor has purposely imbued the character with distinct quirks and characteristics, and the production teams dictate new personality traits for each actor to portray.

Several personality traits remain constant throughout the Doctor's incarnations, most notably a disarming or mercurial surface, concealing a deep well of age, wisdom, melancholy, and darkness. This duality is explored more overtly in the revived series (2005–present), which has described him as "fire and ice and rage, he's like the night and the storm in the heart of the sun, he's ancient and forever, he burns at the centre of time..." and "the man who can turn an army around at the mention of his name". Though the Doctor tends to present a jocular, even childlike, persona, when the stakes rise—e.g., in Pyramids of Mars (1975)—that mask tends to fall, revealing a Doctor who is cold, driven, at times callous.

This dark side sits in contrast to the Doctor's deep compassion, which manifests to different strength and effect across their incarnations. The Doctor prefers a pacifist solution to most problems, and is an ardent champion of life and dignity over violence and war. Their pacifism runs deeply enough to, on many occasions, doubt the morality of destroying their worst enemies - the Daleks. Their compassion for their fallen friend, the Master, often runs against clear reason or self-interest, as when they urge a dying Master to regenerate ("Last of the Time Lords") or vows to watch over them for 1,000 years in order to avert their execution ("Extremis").

The Doctor has a deep sense of right and wrong, and a conviction that it is right to intervene when injustice occurs, which sets them apart from their own people, the Time Lords, and their strict ethic of non-intervention.

Often the Doctor is critical of others who employ deadly force, be they their companions (Leela in The Face of Evil and The Talons of Weng-Chiang (1977); Jack Harkness in "Utopia" (2007)) or other supporting characters. In the episode "The Lodger" (2010), a member of the Doctor's football team offhandedly mentions annihilating the team they will play next week. The Doctor looks very angry and says, "No violence, not while I'm around, not today, not ever. I'm the Doctor, the oncoming storm... and you basically meant beat them in a football match, didn't you?"

The Doctor has a particular dislike for ranged weapons such as firearms or rayguns and tends to make a special effort to avoid their use. The Tenth Doctor especially makes a show of his distaste, discarding guns while declaring "I never would!" ("The Doctor's Daughter") and asserting that he is unarmed: "That's me. Always." ("Doomsday"). On some rare occasions, the Doctor does make use of weapons (as in Day of the Daleks, The Talons of Weng Chiang, and Resurrection of the Daleks), but most of the time it is usually to bluff or employ for an alternative use, e.g., destroying a machine vital to their enemies' scheme ("The End of Time").

Nonetheless, when brought to an extreme (e.g., Earthshock, Vengeance on Varos, "The Christmas Invasion") the Doctor may resort to violence—even deadly force—to protect those considered under the Doctor's care. In Remembrance of the Daleks (1988), the Doctor even contrives for the Daleks' homeworld, Skaro, to be destroyed, albeit manipulating the Daleks into doing it themselves after he sabotaged their equipment. Starting with the 2005 revival, the Doctor carries the weight of a Time War between the Daleks and his people, the Time Lords, in which he believes himself responsible for the genocide of both races, in aid of the greater good, but this burden was lessened after "The Day of the Doctor" revealed that the Doctor's thirteen incarnations joined forces to save Gallifrey and create the illusion of its destruction.

Bearing the strain of his wartime actions, the Ninth Doctor deliberately tortures a lone Dalek he encounters ("Dalek"), despite its pleas to "have pity", stating coldly, "You never did". The Tenth Doctor notably declares a "one chance only" policy when dealing with aliens invading the Earth, leading his companion Donna Noble to comment that he needs "someone" to keep his temperament in check. In "The Family of Blood" (2007), a defeated alien reflects that the Doctor "never raised his voice – that was the worst thing, the fury of a Time Lord". Through the course of his adventures, the Eleventh Doctor underwent significant personality shifts, becoming ever more ruthless when travelling alone; falling into a deep depression and inertia when his friends Amy and Rory were lost to him, and finally undergoing a manic change at the prospect that Clara "Oswin" Oswald was still alive. By contrast, the Twelfth Doctor became a lighter person over the course of his life, beginning with a grim mood where he may have dropped a man out of a hot air balloon and questioning his own nature ("Into the Dalek") but ending with a firm resolve that he would take the hard option just because it was right ("The Doctor Falls").

=== Accent ===
Different actors have used different regional accents in the role. The first six Doctors spoke in Received Pronunciation or "BBC English", as was standard on British television at the time. Sylvester McCoy used a very mild version of his own Scottish accent in the role, and Paul McGann spoke with a faint Liverpudlian lilt. Only rarely is this even addressed in the programme. In the case of McGann's Doctor, who is identified by American characters as "British", he seems only slightly conscious of the way he sounds, responding with "Yes, I suppose I am." When the accent of Eccleston's Doctor is clearly described as "Northern", he responds with the line "Lots of planets have a North." Capaldi's portrayal of the Doctor explicitly identified his own accent as "Scottish" after commenting on the English accents of his friends, Jenny Flint and Clara Oswald, while experiencing post-regeneration amnesia ("Deep Breath"). Whittaker's Thirteenth Doctor speaks with the actress' natural Yorkshire accent and is identified as British during a trip to America. The Fifteenth Doctor also speaks with the actor's natural Scottish-Rwandan accent.

Another example is in The Tomb of the Cybermen when the Doctor is identified as "English" and, dissembling, plays along. Though David Tennant speaks with a natural Scottish accent, he played the Tenth Doctor with an Estuary English accent (apart from when, in the Highlands-set episode "Tooth and Claw", the character is pretending to be a local). According to producer Russell T Davies, this was intended as a consequence of spending so much time with Rose. "The Christmas Invasion" would have alluded to this, but the line was cut. Davies also said that after Eccleston's accent, he did not want Tennant "touring the regions" with a Scottish one, (Note: See Regional accents of English.) and so asked Tennant to affect the same accent he used for the earlier BBC period drama Casanova. In contrast, Peter Capaldi was explicitly allowed to continue using his native Scottish accent as the Twelfth Doctor.

In the Big Finish audio adventure The Sirens of Time, the captain aboard a German U-boat assumes that he is English because of the way he pronounces his words: "So, you speak German ... but you speak it like an English gentleman."

=== Clothing ===
The Doctor's clothing has been equally distinctive, from the distinguished Edwardian suits of the First Doctor to the Second Doctor's rumpled, clown-like Chaplinesque attire to the dandyish frills and velvet of the Third Doctor's era. The Fourth Doctor's long frock coat, loose-fitting trousers, occasionally worn a wide-brimmed hat and trailing, multi-striped scarf added to his somewhat shambolic and bohemian image; the Fifth's Edwardian cricketer's outfit suited his youthful, aristocratic air as well as his love of the sport (with a stick of celery on the lapel for an eccentric touch, though in The Caves of Androzani (1984), it is revealed to turn purple when exposed to gases the Doctor is allergic to); and the Sixth's multicoloured jacket, with its cat-shaped lapel pins, reflected the excesses of 1980s fashion. The Seventh Doctor's outfit – a Panama hat, a coat with a scarf, a tie, checked trousers and brogues/wing-tips – was more subdued and suggestive of a showman, reflecting his whimsical approach to life. In later seasons, as his personality grew more mysterious, his jacket, tie and hatband all grew darker.

Throughout the 1980s, question marks formed a constant motif, usually on the shirt collars or, in the case of the Seventh Doctor, on his sleeveless jumper and the handle to his umbrella. The idea was grounded in branding considerations, as was the movement starting in Tom Baker's final season toward an unchanging costume for each Doctor, rather than the variants on a theme employed over the first seventeen years of the programme. When the Eighth Doctor regenerated, he clad himself in a 19th-century frock coat and shirt based on a Wild Bill Hickok costume, reminiscent of the out-of-time quality of earlier Doctors and emphasising the Eighth Doctor's more Romantic persona.

In contrast to the more flamboyant outfits of his predecessors, the Ninth Doctor wore a nondescript, weathered black leather jacket, V-neck jumper and dark trousers. Eccleston stated that he felt that such definitive "costumes" were passé and that the character's trademark eccentricities should show through his actions and clever dialogue, not through gimmicky costumes. Despite this, there is a running joke about his character that the only piece of clothing he changes is his jumper, even when trying to "blend into" a historical era. The one exception, a photograph of him taken in 1912, wearing period gentleman's clothing, resembles the style of the Eighth Doctor.

The Tenth Doctor sports either a brown or a blue pinstripe suit – usually worn with ties – a tan ankle-length coat and trainers, the latter recalling the plimsolls worn by his fifth incarnation. Also like that incarnation (and his first one), he occasionally wears spectacles. In the 2007 Children in Need "Time Crash" special he states that he does not actually need glasses to see, but rather wears them to "look a bit clever", as did the Fifth, whom he meets in the special. On occasions, he wears a black tuxedo with matching black trainers. In interviews, Tennant has described his Doctor's attire as geek chic. According to Tennant, he had always wanted to wear the trainers. The overall costume was influenced by an outfit worn by Jamie Oliver in a TV interview on the talk show Parkinson.

The Tenth Doctor says in "The Runaway Bride" that, like the TARDIS, his pockets are bigger on the inside. The Second, Fourth, Sixth, Seventh, Eleventh and Twelfth Doctors routinely carried numerous items in their coats without this being conspicuous.

The Eleventh Doctor's appearance has been described as appearing like "an Oxford professor", with a tweed jacket, red or blue striped shirt, red or blue bow tie, black or grey trousers with red or blue braces, and black boots. He maintains "Bow ties are cool" even when his companions do not agree, and is delighted to meet Dr Black, the first man who agrees with him, in the episode "Vincent and the Doctor" (2010). As a running gag, he exhibits attraction to unusual hats, like a fez, a pirate hat and a stetson, often only to have them destroyed by River Song shortly afterwards. Starting in the second half of series 7, the Eleventh Doctor reverted to wearing a frock coat, similar to those worn by his predecessors, with a waistcoat and black trousers, black braces, an off-white shirt, bow tie and brown boots. He also added round-rimmed glasses that belonged to former companion Amy Pond.

The Twelfth Doctor's costume has been described as looking like a magician. It echoes his third incarnation's look, specifically the red lining on the inside of his Crombie coat. It has been described as "no frills, no scarves, just 100% rebel Time Lord". The Twelfth Doctor wears a white shirt with no tie, with his top button fastened and no cuff links, a dark blue cardigan (sometimes replaced with a waistcoat), navy trousers and black boots.

The Thirteenth Doctor's costume features blue high-waisted culottes with yellow braces, a navy blue or burgundy shirt with a rainbow stripe across it, a lilac-blue coat, brown lace-up boots, blue socks and piercings on her left ear. During the clip where Whittaker was announced as the new Doctor, she wore a grey overcoat over a black hoodie, reminiscent of Capaldi's costume.

The Doctor has occasionally expressed distaste and confusion about his own fashion choices in other incarnations. The First Doctor described his third incarnation as a "Dandy", and his second incarnation as a clown. (Note: The Three Doctors. Doctor Who. 1972–1973. BBC One.) The Tenth Doctor cringed at his fifth self's choice of wearing celery on his lapel. (Note: "Time Crash". Doctor Who. 2007. BBC One.) The Eleventh Doctor, upon meeting his previous self, referred to his Converse trainers as "sand-shoes". (Note: "The Day of the Doctor". Doctor Who. 2013. BBC One.) The Twelfth Doctor believes his previous incarnation's long scarf "looked stupid" (Note: "Deep Breath". Doctor Who. 2014. BBC One.) and his prior's love of bow-ties is "embarrassing".

== Age ==
Over the course of the franchise, statements made by the Doctor and other characters have placed his age at anything from 450 to several thousand years old, while a technicality associated with a plot twist in a 2015 episode could be interpreted to mean that he has lived for four and a half billion years.

In early production documents, the Doctor was said to be 650 years old, although this was never stated on screen. By the time the Doctor did cite his age ("Let me see, in human terms, 400, yes, 450 years" in the serial The Tomb of the Cybermen (1967); he kept a 500-year diary), he had already regenerated to a younger form. The intention at that time was that regeneration had turned back the Doctor's clock, making him younger both in appearance and in biological age. Since the Doctor's age had never previously been given, 450 Earth years became a starting point onto which further years would be progressively added as the series continued and the character lived out his further incarnations.

The Third Doctor implied in Doctor Who and the Silurians (1970) and in The Mind of Evil (1971) that he had a lifetime that covered "several thousand years". While the Doctor's age has never been a known quantity, these numbers are the most difficult to reconcile with the rest of the series.

By the time of The Brain of Morbius, the Fourth Doctor was stated to be 749 years old ("something like 750 years" in the prior Pyramids of Mars, which prompts Sarah Jane Smith to joke that he will "soon be middle-aged"). In The Ribos Operation (1978), Romana said the Doctor was 759 years old and had been piloting the TARDIS for 523 years, making him 236 when he first "borrowed" it. When the Doctor encounters his old friend Drax in The Armageddon Factor (1979), Drax says it has been 450 years since their time together at the academy, suggesting only that Drax was 450 years younger, but implying nothing about the Doctor's age, since it could have been a different amount of time for him. Drax implies that the Doctor got his doctorate after that. In The Robots of Death (1977), the Fourth Doctor states he is 750 years old.

In Revelation of the Daleks (1985), the Sixth Doctor said that he was "a 900-year-old Time Lord", and in Time and the Rani (1987), the Seventh Doctor's age was 953, the same as villainous Time Lady the Rani (in both serials, the Doctor's age is stated in dialogue). In Remembrance of the Daleks (1988), the Seventh Doctor said that he had "900 years' experience" rewiring alien equipment. In the 1996 television movie, the Seventh Doctor has a 900-year diary in his TARDIS.

Amongst the works of spin-off prose fiction, in the Fourth Doctor comic "The Time Witch", after the Doctor and Sharon cross through the split in time which ages them four years, the Doctor says "I shall still think of myself as 743 ... or was it 730, I never can remember...". The Sixth Doctor celebrated his 991st birthday in the short story "Brief Encounter: A Wee Deoch an..?", written by Colin Baker, in Doctor Who Magazine Winter Special 1991: UNIT Exposed. The Seventh Doctor celebrated his 1,000th birthday in Set Piece by Kate Orman, and the Eighth Doctor declared his age to be 1,012 in Vampire Science by Orman and Jonathan Blum. The Eighth Doctor spent nearly a century on Earth during a story arc spread over several novels, and around 100 years asleep in The Sleep of Reason by Martin Day. In the Big Finish Productions audio play Orbis, the Eighth Doctor says that he has spent 600 years living on the planet Orbis since the previous play. He states that he lost count of his true age long ago, and rounds it down, taking into account the varying lengths of a "year" in different locations.

In the 2005 series, the Ninth Doctor's age is stated in publicity materials as 900 years, and in "Aliens of London", he says, "Nine hundred years of time and space, and I've never been slapped by someone's mother." Rose follows up by asking him if he is 900 years old, and he replies affirmatively. He restates this in "The Empty Child" as "Nine hundred years of phone box travel and it's the only thing left that surprises me." In "Voyage of the Damned" (2007), the Tenth Doctor states that he is 903 years of age, the first time since Time and the Rani that an exact number has been stated in dialogue; previously, the Master indicated the Doctor's age to be about 900 in "The Sound of Drums"/"Last of the Time Lords" (2007) story arc.

In "The Sound of Drums", the Master ages the Doctor by 100 years using his laser screwdriver, leaving the Doctor with an elderly appearance. In "Last of the Time Lords", the Master states to the population of Earth that the Doctor is nine hundred years old, and informs his subjects he will show them the Doctor's true form, suspending his ability to regenerate. The Master proceeds to age the Doctor further with his laser screwdriver, reducing him to a tiny, wrinkled being, subsequently imprisoned inside a bird cage until reverted to his current form with the help of Martha Jones, 15 satellites and the entire population of Earth. However, as the resolution of that story is by means of a reversal of time, there is a suggestion that the events of that year never actually took place, and yet are present in the Doctor's memory.

In "The End of Time" (2009–2010), the Tenth Doctor tells Wilfred Mott he is 906 years old. In "Flesh and Stone" (2010), the Eleventh Doctor tells Amy Pond that he is 907. "The Impossible Astronaut" (2011) depicts the Doctor from two different points in his life, one at age 909 and the other at 1103. In "The Doctor's Wife" (2011), the TARDIS, while embodied as Idris, says the Doctor has been travelling with her for 700 years. By the end of series six, the Doctor has reached the age of 1103, the older version that appeared in "The Impossible Astronaut". The next series ages the Doctor further, with "A Town Called Mercy" (2012) establishing that he is now approximately 1,200 years old. However, in "The Bells of Saint John" (2013), the Doctor says that he is "one thousand years old", whilst in "Journey to the Centre of the TARDIS" (2013) he comments that he has piloted the TARDIS "for over 900 years".

In the 50th anniversary special, "The Day of the Doctor" (2013), the Eleventh Doctor is queried about his age by his younger self, to which he replies "I dunno, I lose track. Twelve hundred and something I think, unless I'm lying. I can't remember if I'm lying about my age — that's how old I am." He makes several references to being 400 years older than the War Doctor, which would encompass the timelines of the Ninth, Tenth and Eleventh Doctors. In the next episode, "The Time of the Doctor", the Doctor spends centuries defending the planet Trenzalore. After one interval, the Doctor states he has lived there for 300 years. Another long interval passes, during which the Doctor's age is not given, but he physically ages considerably before regenerating into the Twelfth Doctor. The 2014 e-book Tales of Trenzalore states the Doctor spent 900 years on Trenzalore.

In the following episode, "Deep Breath" (2014), the Twelfth Doctor states that he is over 2,000 years old. However, writer Steven Moffat clarified: "He's lying. How could he know, unless he's marking it on a wall? He could be 8,000 years old, he could be a million. He has no clue. The calendar will give him no clues." In the episode "The Girl Who Died", the Doctor is shown to possess a 2000-year diary. Moffat later said that he believes the Doctor remembers all 4.5 billion years he spent dying and recreating himself in "Heaven Sent" (2015), and that the confession dial extracts the Doctor's memories of each iteration, feeding them back to him as a means of torture. In a subsequent interview with SFX, Moffat confirmed, "Technically he's four and a half billion years old."

== Romance ==
=== Original series ===
The first episode establishes that Susan Foreman is the Doctor's granddaughter; however, neither Susan nor the Doctor ever speaks of her parents.

The First Doctor did flirt with — and was accidentally engaged to — the character Cameca in The Aztecs (1964). Although this was part of a plot to get the TARDIS back, there was a hint of mutual attraction in Hartnell's performance (especially as he is ultimately unable to leave behind the love token she has given him).

The Third Doctor expresses hurt feelings when his companion Jo Grant leaves him for an idealistic scientific adventurer whom she describes as "a younger version" of the Doctor (The Green Death). Jo kisses the Doctor on the cheek before she departs, the second time this form of affection was shown on screen (the Second Doctor having similarly kissed Zoe in The War Games).

There was on-screen chemistry between Tom Baker's Fourth Doctor and his wife-to-be Lalla Ward's Second Romana. A 1980 television commercial broadcast in Australia for Prime Computers showed Baker and Ward romancing each other in character as the Doctor and Romana, with the Doctor (prompted by the computer) proposing marriage.

In voiceovers on Peter Davison's DVDs, the matter of physical affection is discussed. According to Davison and Matthew Waterhouse (Adric), producer John Nathan-Turner had very strict rules laid down about how the companions were allowed to physically interact with the Doctor, and Adric was allowed more physical contact with the Doctor than the female companions to downplay potential romantic and/or sexual connotations. Waterhouse, who is openly gay, has since stated that he played Adric as being attracted to the Doctor.

=== Revived series ===
Beginning in 2005, the programme has suggested that the Doctor has romantic feelings towards different people. This shift is satirised in "The Day of the Doctor" wherein the War Doctor, having witnessed a passionate kiss exchanged between the Tenth Doctor and Queen Elizabeth I, asks of the Eleventh Doctor, "Is there a lot of this in the future?" to which he replies, "It does start to happen, yeah."

The series has played with the idea of a romantic relationship between the Ninth Doctor and Rose Tyler, with many characters assuming they were a couple. Rose's boyfriend Mickey Smith clearly views the Doctor as a romantic rival for whom Rose has left him. Each shows flashes of jealousy when the other flirts with other characters. In "The Parting of the Ways", the Doctor's male companion Jack Harkness kisses both the Doctor and Rose in what he believes is a last goodbye. In the same episode, the Doctor kisses Rose Tyler to get the time vortex energy that was killing her back into the TARDIS, subsequently "killing" him and causing his next regeneration.

In the New Series Adventures novel Only Human by Gareth Roberts, Rose asks the Doctor how he would know that marrying for love is overrated, to which he cryptically answers, "Who says I don't? You ask the Lady Mary Wortley Montagu." In a December 2005 interview on BBC Four, actor David Tennant, who had just taken the role of the Tenth Doctor, described the relationship between the Doctor and Rose as "basically a love story without the shagging". He later stated that Rose was the Doctor's girlfriend, though it was never explicitly stated on screen.

The Doctor's relationship with Rose intensifies after he regenerates into the Tenth Doctor. In "New Earth", Rose's body is temporarily inhabited by Cassandra, who kisses the Doctor romantically. This is one of the few scenes in the entire programme where the Doctor is kissed romantically by his companion. In "School Reunion" (2006), the arrival of the Doctor's previous companion Sarah Jane Smith and his reaction to seeing her again prompts jealousy and worry from Rose, and Sarah all but admits that she has long been in love with the Doctor. The Doctor also expresses dismay at having his companions age while he regenerates. In the episode, "The Girl in the Fireplace" (written by Steven Moffat), the Doctor develops a romantic relationship with Madame de Pompadour, with whom he shares a passionate kiss. She even takes him away to "dance", but how far the metaphor (coined in the episode "The Doctor Dances") is taken is not seen on screen. In the novel The Stone Rose, by Jacqueline Rayner, the Doctor kisses Rose after she saves him from being petrified, with it being described as "a kiss of gratitude and joy and unspeakable pleasure at being alive". In "The Impossible Planet" (2006), the Doctor and Rose share an awkward moment when they have to consider settling down in one time period and Rose suggests they do so together. She later plants a kiss for good luck on the Doctor's spacesuit prior to his descent into the pit. In "The Satan Pit" the Doctor, fearing for his life, tells someone "If you see Rose, tell her... tell her... oh, she knows." In "Doomsday", when the Doctor says his goodbye to Rose, she finally tells him that she loves him. He begins to reply, but the message is cut off, and he is unable to reciprocate; in the episode's audio commentary, executive producer Julie Gardner had stated that "he absolutely was going to say it... he was going to tell her he loved her."

Executive producer Russell T Davies states in Doctor Who Confidential that the reunion between the Doctor and Rose in "The Stolen Earth" is a parody of romantic film conventions because the heightened emotional content is abruptly interrupted by the Doctor being shot by a Dalek. In the next episode, "Journey's End", Rose challenges the Doctor to say what he did not get to say before, to which he replies, "Does it need saying?" His half-human duplicate, however, does whisper it into Rose's ear, and the two of them kiss; Rose gets an emphatically romantic resolution to her romance storyline, as the duplicate Doctor and Rose continue to live together on a parallel Earth. Gardner commented in Confidential that although the audience cannot hear, it is obvious that he is saying "I love you".

Throughout series three (2007), companion Martha Jones pines for the Doctor's affection following a kiss between them which was only used as a "genetic transfer" to distract their pursuers. She is distraught when, temporarily turned into a human in "Human Nature", the Doctor's human persona, John Smith, falls in love with nurse Joan Redfern. She admits in "The Family of Blood" to Smith that "[the Doctor] is everything to me, and he doesn't even look at me, but I don't care, because I love him to bits, and I hope to God he won't remember me saying this." The Doctor tells Joan he is capable of everything that Smith was, but she rejects his attempt to establish a relationship with her as the Doctor. In the following episode, "Blink", he says he is "rubbish at weddings, especially my own". Martha eventually quits as the Doctor's full-time companion in the series finale "Last of the Time Lords" because she is in love with the Doctor and he seems unable or unwilling to reciprocate; she received similar commiseration from Jack Harkness, who is also infatuated with him, in "The Sound of Drums".

Subsequently, in the 2008 series, the Doctor's friendship with Donna Noble is strengthened, after the infatuations with Martha and Rose, by the knowledge that she has no romantic interest in him whatsoever. Davies' last clear allusion to the Doctor's romantic capacity occurs at the beginning of his last episode as showrunner, "The End of Time". The Tenth Doctor claims to have married "Good Queen Bess, and let me tell you, her nickname is no longer... (clears throat)", a reference to Elizabeth I of England's nickname "The Virgin Queen". The marriage, which is described as "a mistake", explained Queen Elizabeth's reaction to seeing the Tenth Doctor in an earlier episode, "The Shakespeare Code". Subsequent episodes have alluded to this romantic, possibly sexual relationship. This relationship, including the marriage and the "mistake" that led to it (a case of mistaken identity involving a Zygon commander in 1562), eventually unfolds on screen in "The Day of the Doctor".

Episodes written by Moffat have continued to hint at the Doctor's romantic capacity: his stories during the Russell T Davies tenure as showrunner included the admission of a sex life in "The Doctor Dances" and the romance with Madame de Pompadour in "The Girl in the Fireplace", past marriages in "Blink", and the introduction of recurring character River Song in the 2008 episodes "Silence in the Library"/"Forest of the Dead", who indicates she is a lover of the Doctor. In his tenure as showrunner (2010–2017), the series continued to imply that the Doctor will have a relationship with, and perhaps marry, River Song. Additionally, Moffat has companion Amy Pond attempt to seduce the Doctor in "Flesh and Stone", although he expresses shock at the idea, protesting that she was human. In "A Christmas Carol", the Eleventh Doctor finds himself accidentally engaged to film star Marilyn Monroe during a visit to 1950s Hollywood. The Doctor's past romantic relationship with Elizabeth I is alluded to in Moffat episodes "The Beast Below" and "The Wedding of River Song", as well as in "Amy's Choice" by Simon Nye.

In her 2010 appearances, River continues to hint at a relationship with the Doctor in her relative past and his relative future. In "The Big Bang", River suggests to the Doctor that she is married to him in his personal future. When River kisses the Doctor in "Day of the Moon", it becomes clear that whereas this is the Doctor's first kiss with her, it is to be her last with him and that she shall soon be heading to The Library where she dies. In "A Good Man Goes to War", River is seen returning from a date with the future Doctor, and repeatedly calls the present-day Doctor "my love". In "Let's Kill Hitler", a young River Song compares herself to Mrs. Robinson and kisses the Doctor; the first time in an attempt to kill him, the second to save his life. Later she resolves to study archaeology so that she can encounter the Doctor again. Because she loves him, she refuses to shoot him in "The Wedding of River Song", creating an alternate timeline. In this world, the Doctor marries River in a very brief ceremony witnessed by Amy and Rory, so that he may allow time to return to normal and go to his death, while secretly disclosing to River that he will fake his death. Although the alternate timeline is erased, all future episodes act as though the wedding was real. Later, when Dorium comments that River is incarcerated in the Stormcage for "all her days", the Doctor responds "Her days, yes, her nights...well...that's between her and me." After this episode, the banter and gentle sexual innuendo between them becomes less teasing and more serious.

In "The Name of the Doctor" (2013), the Doctor kisses a holographic projection of River Song, based on the copy of her mind archived in the great Library of the 51st century. During this episode, both the Doctor and River call her his wife. He reveals that the reason he has avoided mentioning her since her death was for fear that the memory would hurt too much – as River notes to colleagues, "he hates endings". After this exchange, he bids her a final farewell – but at her request – phrasing it with the implication that they may meet again.

Despite this, the Doctor's limited understanding of human romance and sexuality has been the subject of many jokes. For example, in "Flesh and Stone", after being kissed by Amy Pond, his first response is to gasp, "But you're human!", and he later blithely mentions this embrace to her fiancé Rory in the following episode, "The Vampires of Venice", not realising this would upset Rory. In "The Doctor's Wife", when he tells Amy and Rory that he is redoing the TARDIS's guest room, they suggest, "Perhaps not bunk beds this time", and he does not understand why a married couple would not find bunk beds preferable to other furniture. In "A Good Man Goes to War", he is asked about Amy and Rory's sex life and calls it "private human stuff".

In "The Time of the Doctor" (2013), it is revealed that the Doctor, in an unspecified prior incarnation to the Eleventh, engaged in a romance with a woman named Tasha Lem. Their attraction appeared to continue when the Eleventh encountered her again, even after Lem was technically killed and made into a Dalek-human hybrid.

At first, the Twelfth Doctor explicitly rejected the idea of having a romantic relationship with his companion Clara Oswald. He implied that in his previous form, he had come to see himself as Clara's "boyfriend" in an attempt to avoid confronting his extreme age and alien nature. Initially it was reported that Peter Capaldi told tabloids there would be "no flirting" between him and Clara, likening such a potential relationship to Papa and Nicole, but the actor himself discarded that. The episode "Deep Breath" introduces a character named Missy who identifies the Doctor as her boyfriend. Missy is later revealed to be a female incarnation of the Master. As the character of the Twelfth Doctor evolved, so did his relationship with Clara. In a spring 2015 interview, Steven Moffat indicated that the Doctor had never stopped being "besotted" with Clara, and that he "loves them (companions) more than they love him". In a media roundtable interview at the 2015 San Diego Comic Con, Capaldi went further, saying the two were romantically involved, just not in the traditional sense, "It's romantic in the old sense. Two people who are really crazy about each other..." The narrative of series nine culminated in a three-part story arc in which Clara dies and the Doctor spends the next 4.5 billion years executing a gambit to change history and save her life. Further romance for the Twelfth Doctor was depicted in the 2015 Christmas special, "The Husbands of River Song", which had a romantic plot. In the special, the Twelfth Doctor meets his one-time wife, River Song, for the first (and, narratively, the last) time.

The Thirteenth Doctor experienced her first on-screen same-sex romantic situation with companion Yaz Khan, who admitted she was in love with her in "Eve of the Daleks" (2022). The Doctor confronts Yaz about them in "Legend of the Sea Devils", saying she reciprocated Yaz's affection while refusing to become involved with another human companion who would one day die.

In "The Giggle", the Fifteenth Doctor admits to the Fourteenth Doctor that he loved Sarah Jane, Rose and River. In "Rogue", the Fifteenth Doctor has a whirlwind romance with the bounty hunter Rogue (Jonathan Groff). This marked the Doctor's first televised male-male romance, and their second same-sex romance following Yaz.

=== Other media ===
The spin-off media both before and after the television movie have toyed with the idea in various ways. In the 1995 Virgin New Adventures novel Human Nature by Paul Cornell, the Seventh Doctor takes on the human guise of "Dr John Smith" and has a romance with a teacher named Joan in 1914, albeit as a means to understand the human condition and with the Doctor's own memories as a Time Lord suppressed. The relationship ended when the Doctor was restored to normal, admitting to Joan that he knows that Smith was fond of her but unable to reciprocate those feelings himself. This novel was adapted to the screen and comprised two episodes in the new programme: "Human Nature" and "The Family of Blood", featuring the Tenth Doctor, with the Doctor implying that he retained Smith's feelings for Joan, although the more traumatic nature of the transformation may have impacted his feelings after he returned to normal.

In the Virgin novel Death and Diplomacy, by Dave Stone, the Seventh Doctor implies that he intentionally creates an image of asexuality to keep things simple.

The concluding chapter of The Dying Days, an Eighth Doctor novel by Lance Parkin, strongly implies intimacy occurring between the Doctor and Bernice Summerfield. This encounter was later confirmed in the audio drama "Benny's Story", a chapter of the Big Finish Productions release The Company of Friends, marking the only time to date that a classic-era Doctor has been confirmed as sleeping with one of his companions.

Writer Lawrence Miles has stated that he believes the Eighth Doctor has sex with I. M. Foreman between the events of his novels Interference – Book One and Interference – Book Two. In Book Two, the Doctor explains that he has become interested in romance and the idea of being close to someone in his current body, but that he is reluctant to explore these feelings with his companions because of the emotional baggage a relationship with him would bring.

In various novels – especially Lungbarrow – it is established that Time Lords do not reproduce sexually, but emerge from genetic Looms fully grown, though the same book hints that the Doctor's birth was an exception. (Unlike his cousins, he has a belly button.) Lance Parkin's novels Cold Fusion (1997) and The Infinity Doctors (1998) suggest that "wombborn" families have survived in secret, and that the Doctor and the Master were born to these families. In the 1996 film Doctor Who, the Doctor states he is "half-human, on [his] mother's side", which the Master also affirms. The revived programme portrays Time Lord children, with a child version of the Doctor appearing in the 2014 episode "Listen".

In the Big Finish Productions audio play Loups-Garoux, the Fifth Doctor reluctantly agrees to marry the werewolf Ileana De Santos and, although he gets out of it later, as in Cameca's case, a degree of mutual attraction is present. In the audio plays involving the Eighth Doctor, his companion Charley confesses her romantic feelings for him in Zagreus, but, although he admits he loves her at the time, it is a highly dramatic moment and the relationship does not progress beyond the platonic.

The recurring novel and audio character Iris Wildthyme, created by Paul Magrs, is first introduced in the Short Trips story Old Flames, is a past romantic interest of the Doctor's who continues to flirt with him whenever they meet. More of the Doctor's past relationships are explored in The Infinity Doctors and Cold Fusion.

The question of romance is sometimes sidestepped with plot devices in the spin-off media. In the 2001 BBC Books novel Father Time by Lance Parkin, the Doctor adopts an orphaned Gallifreyan-like alien called Miranda. It is implied that Miranda is actually the daughter of the Doctor himself from the far future. Miranda returns in the novel Sometime Never... by Justin Richards, with her own daughter Zezanne. At that novel's end, a time-active being called Soul travels into the past accompanied by Zezanne, the two believing themselves to be the Doctor and Susan, respectively.

In The One Doctor, the Doctor kisses Sally-Anne Stubbins to bluff to the Sussyurat that he was not the Doctor but Banto Zane; this kiss showed no affection.

== Reception ==
The character of the Doctor has been generally well received by the public. In a 2001 poll conducted by Channel 4, the Doctor was ranked sixth on its list of the 100 Greatest TV Characters. In 2008, The Daily Telegraph dubbed the Doctor "Britain's favourite alien", noting the character's enduring popularity, while abroad the character has come to be seen as a British cultural icon. UGO Networks listed the Doctor as one of their best heroes of all time.

== See also ==
- List of Doctor Who parodies
- Dr. Who, a human version of the character played by Peter Cushing
