= Vanderdeken's Children =

1998 novel by Christopher Bulis

- Author: Christopher Bulis
- Series: Doctor Who book: Eighth Doctor Adventures
- Release number: 14
- Subject: Featuring: Eighth Doctor; Sam
- Publisher: BBC Books
- Publication date: August 1998
- ISBN: 0-563-40590-2
- Preceded by: Placebo Effect
- Followed by: The Scarlet Empress

Vanderdeken's Children is an original novel written by Christopher Bulis and based on the long-running British science fiction television series Doctor Who. It features the Eighth Doctor and Sam.

== Plot overview ==
The TARDIS is thrown off course by a 'vortex discontinuity'. They materialise in deep space, several hundred light years form Earth in the year 3123 A.D. The discover a derelict, cylinder like ship, over four-thousand meters in length.
There are two other ships in the area as well, from rival star-systems, the Emindarian passenger liner, Cirrandaria, and the Nimosian warship, Indomitable. Both ships claim they have the right to salvage the derelict.
Narrowly avoiding destruction by the Indomitable, the Doctor and Sam land on the Cirrandaria.
The Indomitable sends a technician in a pod down to the derelict to explore. The technician, after some examining, begins to think that the derelict was grown, not built. He loses contact with Indomitable, and comes to believe he is being followed by a creature. He attempts to escape by climbing up one of the pylons that ring both ends of the ship. He pictures the monsters from his childhood reaching up for him, lets go of the pylon and falls to his death.
The Cirrandaria sends its own expedition down to the derelict, including the Doctor and Sam, and all hell breaks loose...
