= Paul Magrs =

English writer and lecturer (born 1969)

- Born: 12 November 1969 (age 56); Jarrow, County Durham, England
- Education: Lancaster University
- Occupations: Writer, lecturer
- Partner: Jeremy Hoad
- Writing career
- Period: 1990s–present
- Genres: Magic realism, science fiction, horror, mystery, young adult, queer fiction
- Notable works: Marked for Life; Modern Love; Strange Boy; Exchange; Doctor Who, Iris Wildthyme; The Brenda and Effie Mysteries

Paul Magrs (pronounced "Mars"; born 12 November 1969) is an English writer and lecturer. He was born in Jarrow, England, and now lives in Manchester with his partner, author and lecturer Jeremy Hoad.

== Early life ==
Magrs was born in Jarrow, Tyne & Wear, on 12 November 1969. In 1975 he moved with his family to Newton Aycliffe, County Durham; his parents divorced shortly after the move. At the age of 17, Magrs was queer-bashed, and his father was the police officer who took the report on the incident; it was the last time Paul Magrs saw his father.

In Newton Aycliffe, Magrs attended Woodham Comprehensive School, where Mark Gatiss was two years ahead of him and in the same drama group. Magrs went on to Lancaster University, where he received a first class BA in English (1991), an MA in Creative Writing (1991) and a PhD in English (1995). His doctoral thesis was on Angela Carter.

== Literary career ==
Magrs is the author of numerous fiction and non-fiction works. His first published writing was the short story "Patient Iris", published 1995 in New Writing Four (edited by A. S. Byatt and Alan Hollinghurst). This was soon followed by his debut novel, Marked for Life, the same year. Magrs' first three novels, Marked for Life, Does It Show? (1997) and Could It Be Magic? (1998), share characters, a magical realist tone and a setting: the fictional Phoenix Court council estate in Newton Aycliffe.

Magrs' first children's book, Strange Boy (2002), prompted controversy due to homosexual content involving its 10-year-old protagonist and a 14-year-old neighbour. Representatives of the NASUWT teachers' union and the conservative Christian Institute argued that the book should not be stocked in school libraries, and some newspapers suggested that doing so in England would be illegal due to the Section 28 ban on "promoting homosexuality" in schools. However, the Chartered Institute of Library and Information Professionals supported libraries' purchase of Strange Boy, as did representatives of Stonewall and other gay rights organizations. Magrs noted that the book was "about 95% autobiographical" and described the controversy as "ludicrous".

=== Doctor Who ===
Magrs has written several novels, short stories and audio dramas relating to Doctor Who, many of which also feature his character Iris Wildthyme.

Iris was initially portrayed as an eccentric and unreliable Time Lady, whose TARDIS takes the form of a London AEC Routemaster double-decker bus (the route 22 to Putney Common), though in a series of short story collections and novels not written for the BBC, the character has been repurposed to remove any copyrighted aspects. Iris Wildthyme was originally created for Magrs' unpublished first novel, which was named after her; another version of Iris also appears in Marked for Life. The character features in all of Magrs' three contributions to BBC Books' Eighth Doctor Adventures, in several Big Finish Productions audio dramas by Magrs and other writers, in a novel series from Snowbooks and in short story and novella collections published by Big Finish and Obverse Books.

Magrs has also written licensed Doctor Who fiction without Wildthyme, including the 2007 novel, Sick Building, (which made the shortlist for the Doncaster Book Award), a variety of audio plays for Big Finish and the BBC audio series, Hornets' Nest, which marked the first time Tom Baker had returned to play the Doctor in a full-length drama since he left the role in 1981. After the success of Hornets' Nest, Magrs wrote two sequel series Demon Quest (2010) and Serpent Crest (2011).

=== The Brenda and Effie Mysteries ===
Magrs' current ongoing novel series is The Brenda and Effie Mysteries, starring Brenda, the Bride of Frankenstein, who has now retired and runs a B&B in Whitby. She and her friend Effie, a local white witch, investigate spooky goings-on in the town. As of November 2020, there have been nine books in the series, the latest being A Game of Crones from Snowbooks. The fourth book, Hell's Belles, features characters from Magrs' early Phoenix Court books, while the fifth features characters from Magrs' Doctor Who audio, The Boy That Time Forgot. A short story collection, A Treasury of Brenda and Effie (Obverse Books) and a seventh novel, Fellowship of Ink (snowbooks) were both released in 2017. An eighth novel, Beyond the Veil, was released in 2023 by Obverse Books.

The characters have also appeared in two audio adaptations: a 3-part series for BBC Radio 4, starring Joanna Tope and Monica Gibb, and then a series of award-winning audios from Bafflegab. These starred Anne Reid and included:

1. The Woman in a Black Beehive
2. Bat Out of Hull
3. Spicy Tea and Sympathy
4. Brenda Has Risen from the Grave

In 2020, it was announced Free@Last TV, who produced the Sky1/Acorn TV series Agatha Raisin, were developing a television series.

=== Other novels ===
Magrs' other novels include Aisles (2003) and To the Devil – a Diva! (2004); he has also published several short stories. His novel Exchange was shortlisted for the 2006 Booktrust Teenage Prize and was longlisted for the 2007 Carnegie Medal.

His young adult novel, The Ninnies was listed by the Irish Times as one of the children's books of the year in 2012.

Later novels include two books about his cats, Fester and Bernard, The Story of Fester Cat and Welcome Home, Bernard Socks, a stand-alone novel, 666 Charing Cross Road (ISBN 978-0755359486), and a trilogy of novels about a frontier family on the planet Mars.

== Art ==
HarperCollins have published three books featuring his artwork.

- The Panda, the Cat and the Dreadful Teddy
- The Tale of Toxic Positivity
- Puss in Books

== Academic work ==
Magrs is a full-time writer, having formerly been a senior lecturer in English Literature and creative writing at Manchester Metropolitan University and having previously taught at the University of East Anglia. With Julia Bell, Magrs edited several issues of the University of East Anglia's literary journal Pretext and The Creative Writing Coursebook (2001).

== Bibliography ==
=== Novels ===
- Modern Love (2000)
- All the Rage (2001)
- Strange Boy (2002)
- Hands Up! (2003, American title: The Good, the Bat and the Ugly)
- Aisles (2003)
- To the Devil — a Diva! (2004)
- Exchange (2006)
- Twin Freaks (2007)
- The Diary of a Dr Who Addict (2010)
- 666 Charing Cross Road (2011)
- The Ninnies (2012)
- The Story of Fester the Cat (2014)
- Welcome Home, Bernard Socks (2016)
- Hunky Dory (2020)

==== Phoenix Court ====
- Marked for Life (1995)
- Does it Show? (1997)
- Could It be Magic? (1998)
- Fancy Man (2018)

==== The Brenda and Effie Mysteries ====
- Never the Bride (2006)
- Something Borrowed (2007)
- Conjugal Rites (2008)
- Hell's Belles (2009)
- The Bride That Time Forgot (2010)
- Brenda And Effie Forever (2012)
- A Treasury of Brenda and Effie (2017)
- Fellowship of Ink (2017)
- A Game of Crones (2020)
- Beyond the Veil (2023)

==== Iris Wildthyme ====
- Enter Wildthyme (2011)
- Wildthyme Beyond (2012)
- From Wildthyme with Love (2013)

The New Adventures of Iris Wildthyme

- Iris Wildthyme and the Polythene Terror (2019)
- Mother, Maiden, Crone (2020)

==== The Lora Trilogy ====
- Lost on Mars (2015)
- The Martian Girl (2016)
- The Heart of Mars (2018)

=== Short story collections ===
- Playing Out (1997)
- Twelve Stories (2009, Salt Publishing)
- Christmassy Tales (2020)

=== Other works ===
- "The Dreadful Flap" (2009, in Obverse Books' short story collection Iris Wildthyme and the Celestial Omnibus)
- "The Delightful Bag" (2009, in Obverse Books' short story collection The Panda Book of Horror)
- "Facebook for the Dead" (2010, in Obverse Books' short story collection The Obverse Book of Ghosts)
- "Mrs. Hudson at the Christmas Hotel" (2013, in Titan Books' Encounters of Sherlock Holmes)
- "The Ninnies on Putney Common" (2013, in Obverse Books' short story collection Iris: Fifteen, ed. Stuart Douglas, ISBN 978-1909031159)
- "Novel Inside You: Writing, Reading and Creativity" (2019)
- "The Creative Writing Coursebook: Forty-Four Authors Share Advice and Exercises for Fiction and Poetry" (2019, with Julia Bell)

=== Audio stories ===
- "Never the Bride" (1998, BBC Radio 4; expanded version 2008, BBC7)
  - The Night Owls
  - The Vintage Costumed Hero Ball
  - Our Frank
- "Life After Mars" (2002, BBC Radio 4) part of the Fictional Familiars series.
- "Sunseeker" (2005, BBC Radio 4)
- Wildthyme at Large (2005, Iris Wildthyme)
- "The Foster Parents" (2007, in Comma Press' short story collection Phobic)
- "The Longsight Branch" (2 July 2008 BBC Radio 4 Afternoon Reading)
- Land of Wonder (2009, Iris Wildthyme)
- Spanish Ladies (2013, Bafflegab Productions)
- Imaginary Boys (2013, BBC Radio 4)
- Baker's End (2016, Bafflegab Productions)
- Mystery Lady (2018, Storytel)

=== Books as editor ===
- Wildthyme on Top (2005, Iris Wildthyme, Big Finish)
- Iris Wildthyme and the Celestial Omnibus (2009, Iris Wildthyme, Obverse Books, edited with Stuart Douglas)
- The Panda Book of Horror (2009, Iris Wildthyme, Obverse Books, edited with Stuart Douglas)
- Shenanigans: Gay Men Mess with Genre (2010, Obverse Books)
- Iris: Abroad (2010, Iris Wildthyme, Obverse Books, edited with Stuart Douglas)

=== Doctor Who ===
==== BBC Books ====
- The Scarlet Empress (1998)
- The Blue Angel (1999)
- Verdigris (2000)
- Mad Dogs and Englishmen (2002)
- Sick Building (2007)
- The Return of Robin Hood (2022)

==== Short stories ====
- "Old Flames" in Short Trips (1998)
- "Femme Fatale" in More Short Trips (1999)
- "The Longest Story in the World" in Short Trips and Side Steps (2000)
- "Bafflement and Devotion" in Doctor Who Magazine #289 (2000)
- "Jealous, Possessive" in Short Trips: Zodiac (2002)
- "Kept Safe and Sound" in Short Trips: Companions (2003)
- "Lust - Suitors, Inc." in Short Trips: Seven Deadly Sins (2005)
- "The Wickerwork Man" in Short Trips: Farewells (2006)
- "Fanboys" in Short Trips: Snapshots (2007)
- "Zombie Motel" in Doctor Who Storybook 2008 (2007)
- "Hello Children, Everywhere" in Doctor Who Storybook 2009 (2008)
- "Knock Knock!" in Doctor Who Storybook 2010 (2009)
- "The Monster in the Woods" in Doctor Who: Tales of Terror (2017)
- "Teddy Sparkles Must Die" in The Missy Chronicles (2018)
- "That's All Right, Mama" in Doctor Who: Star Tales (2019)

==== Big Finish plays ====
- The Stones of Venice (2001, featuring the Eighth Doctor and Charley Pollard)
- Excelis Dawns (2002, featuring the Fifth Doctor and Iris Wildthyme)
- The Wormery (2003, featuring the Sixth Doctor and Iris Wildthyme; written with Stephen Cole)
- Horror of Glam Rock (2007, featuring the Eighth Doctor and Lucie Miller)
- The Wishing Beast & The Vanity Box (2007, featuring the Sixth Doctor and Melanie Bush)
- The Zygon Who Fell to Earth (2008, featuring the Eighth Doctor and Lucie Miller)
- The Boy That Time Forgot (2008, featuring the Fifth Doctor and Nyssa)
- The Companion Chronicles - Ringpullworld (2009, featuring the Fifth Doctor and Turlough)
- The Companion Chronicles - Find and Replace (2010, featuring the Third Doctor, Jo Grant and Iris Wildthyme)
- The Lady of Mercia (2013, featuring the Fifth Doctor, Tegan Jovanka, Turlough and Nyssa)
- The Companion Chronicles - The Elixir of Doom (2014, featuring Jo Grant and Iris Wildthyme)
- The Peterloo Massacre (2016, featuring the Fifth Doctor, Tegan Jovanka and Nyssa)
- Muse of Fire (2018, featuring the Seventh Doctor, Ace, Hex and Iris Wildthyme)
- The Key to Many Worlds (2025, featuring the Sixth Doctor, Constance, and Iris Wildthyme)

==== BBC Audio plays ====
Hornets' Nest (2009)

- The Stuff of Nightmares (Fourth Doctor, Mike Yates, Mrs. Wibbsey)
- The Dead Shoes (Fourth Doctor, Mike Yates, Mrs. Wibbsey)
- The Circus of Doom (Fourth Doctor, Mike Yates)
- A Sting in the Tale (Fourth Doctor, Mike Yates, Mrs. Wibbsey)
- Hive of Horror (Fourth Doctor, Mike Yates, Mrs. Wibbsey)

Demon Quest (2010)

- The Relics of Time (Fourth Doctor, Mrs. Wibbsey)
- The Demon of Paris (Fourth Doctor, Mrs. Wibbsey)
- A Shard of Ice (Fourth Doctor, Mike Yates)
- Starfall (Fourth Doctor, Mrs. Wibbsey, Mike Yates)
- Sepulchre (Fourth Doctor, Mrs. Wibbsey, Mike Yates)

Serpent Crest (2011)

- Tsar Wars (Fourth Doctor, Mrs. Wibbsey)
- The Broken Crown (Fourth Doctor, Mrs. Wibbsey)
- Aladdin Time (Fourth Doctor, Mrs. Wibbsey)
- The Hexford Invasion (Fourth Doctor, Mrs. Wibbsey, Mike Yates)
- Survivors in Space (Fourth Doctor, Mrs. Wibbsey, Mike Yates)

Single releases

- The Thing from the Sea (2018, Fourth Doctor, Mrs. Wibbsey)
- The Winged Coven (2019, Fourth Doctor, Mrs. Wibbsey, Mike Yates)

Beyond The Doctor

- Bessie Come Home (2021, Bessie)
- London, 1965 (2022, Ian, Barbara)
- Sleeper Agents (2022, Ben, Polly)
- The Penumbra Affair (2022, Mrs. Wibbsey, Polly, Mike Yates)
