= The Scarlet Empress (novel) =

1998 novel by Paul Magrs

- Author: Paul Magrs
- Cover artist: Colin Howard
- Series: Doctor Who book: Eighth Doctor Adventures
- Release number: 15
- Subject: Featuring: Eighth Doctor; Sam, Iris Wildthyme
- Publisher: BBC Books
- Publication date: September 1998
- ISBN: 0-563-40595-3
- Preceded by: Vanderdeken's Children
- Followed by: The Janus Conjunction

The Scarlet Empress is an original novel written by Paul Magrs and based on the long-running British science fiction television series Doctor Who. It features the Eighth Doctor, Sam and Iris Wildthyme.

== Synopsis ==
On the ancient planet of Hyspero, a world where magic still exists, the Doctor reads tales from the Aja’ib, a strange book full of peculiar adventure stories, while Sam goes exploring and meets an alligator skinned man, Gila, chained up in a double-decker London bus. Using the bus to come to her rescue, the Doctor and Sam are soon caught up in a struggle for survival alongside Iris Wildthyme, a fellow time-traveller, the owner of the double decker bus, a serving Conservative MP, and - possibly - a fellow Time Lord.

Iris claims to be on a mission for the current Scarlet Empress, but the Doctor suspects she has ulterior motives. However, the planet has suffered under the rule of the Scarlet Empresses for thousands of years and so the Doctor and Sam embark on a perilous journey across Hyspero to discover the truth.

== Critical response ==
TV Zone called the book 'a brilliantly provocative, lyrical and mature Doctor Who novel'.
