= Jamie Robertson =

British composer (born 1981)

- Born: 30 May 1981 (age 45)
- Origin: Essex, England
- Genres: Film scores
- Occupations: Composer, music producer, sound designer
- Years active: 2003–present
- Website: jamiemusic.co.uk

Jamie Robertson (born 30 May 1981) is an English film score composer.

== Biography ==
Jamie Robertson is the Composer of 'Bad Dinosaurs' the Massive worldwide hit on Netflix from the creators of Terrible Lizards. He Is also Regular Composer for Doctor Who Audios for Big finish Productions as well as many Audio dramas including Sherlock Holmes, UFO, The Prisoner and Warhammer.

Born in 1981 and with no major Music training he self taught to become the composer he is today. He is also a massive fan of the Paranormal and in 2020 launched his own series "Paranormal Torch" on YouTube.

He also composed six music tracks for the Final Doom modification, Plutonia 2, in 2008.

== Filmography (as composer) ==
2024

- Bad Dinosaurs Netflix Animation

2023

- Shelf Life- Animation

2021

- KuVina- Short

2020

- 50 Shades of Graham (Animation)
- Doctor Who - Lockdown Videos - Fear is a superpower (Animation)
- Doctor Who - Lockdown Videos - The Shadow in the Mirror (Animation)
- Doctor Who - Lockdown Videos - Shadow of Doubt (Animation)

2019

- The Device- TV Drama
- Harmless- Short

2018

- Sierra Leone's Disgruntled Youth- Documentary
- Cycling Nomads- Documentary
- One for you Two for Me- Short

2017

- Sierra Leone's Disgruntled Youth- Documentary
- Fred's Shed- Scot
- The Mammoosh- Short

2016

- All About the Mckenzies- TV Drama ITV

2015

- Perceptions- Short
- kettling of the Voices- Documentary
- Terrible Lizards- Pilot Animation

2014

- All about the McKenzies- TV Series (Series 2 onwards) by Samuell Benta)

2013

- Doctor Who Phantoms of the Deep (with Tom Baker and Mary Tamm)
- Vienna The Memory Box (with Chase Masterson) – Brand new Series with Music and Sound Design/Theme tune.

2012

- Warhammer Garro:Sword of Truth (with Toby Longworth and John Banks)
- Doctor Who 1001 Nights (with Peter Davison and Sarah Sutton)
- Doctor Who Night of the Stormcrow (with Tom Baker and Louise Jameson) – Released December 2013, But Subscribers get it December 2012.
- Doctor Who The Renaissance Man (with Tom Baker and Louise Jameson with Ian McNeice
- Doctor Who Destination Nerva (with Tom Baker and Louise Jameson
- Doctor Who The Rosemariners (with Frazer Hines Wendy Padbury
- Doctor Who Black and White (with Sylvester McCoy Sophie Aldred Philip Olivier
- Doctor Who The First Sontarans (with Colin Baker and Nicola Bryant)
- Stargate Stargate series 2 – Main theme Composer
- Jago and Litefoot series 3 – Main Theme Composer
- Jago and Litefoot series 4 – Main Theme Composer
- Sherlock Holmes – The Adventure Of The Perfidious Mariner – Nicholas Briggs Richard Earl) – Main Theme Composer & Composer

2011

- Doctor Who The Silver Turk (with Paul McGann and Julie Cox
- Doctor Who Robophobia (with Colin Baker Nicola Walker
- Doctor Who Heroes of Sontar (with Peter Davison Mark Strickson Sarah Sutton
- Doctor Who The Feast of Axos (with Colin Baker)
- Doctor Who Peri and the Piscon Paradox (with Nicola Bryant and Colin Baker)
- Highlander Highlander Season 2
- Warhammer The Madness Within (with John Banks)
- Warhammer Oath Of Moment (with Toby Longworth)
- Warhammer Legion of one (with Toby Longworth)
- Jago and Litefoot series 2 – Main Theme Composer
- Sherlock Holmes – The Final Problem/The Empty House – Nicholas Briggs Richard Earl) – Main Theme Composer & Composer
- Sherlock Holmes – The Reification of Hans Gerber – Nicholas Briggs Richard Earl) – Main Theme Composer & Composer
- Sherlock Holmes – The Hound of the Baskervilles – Nicholas Briggs Richard Earl) – Main Theme Composer & Composer
- Sherlock Holmes – The Tangled Skein – Nicholas Briggs Richard Earl) – Main Theme Composer & Composer

2010

- Doctor Who Relative Dimensions (with Paul McGann Jake McGann Carole Ann Ford Niky Wardley
- Doctor Who Nevermore (with Paul McGann Niky Wardley
- Doctor Who Situation Vacant (with Paul McGann Joe Thomas Niky Wardley
- Doctor Who Legend of the Cybermen (with Colin Baker)
- Doctor Who The Architects of History (with Sylvester McCoy and Tracey Childs)
- Warhammer Throne of Lies John Banks and Beth Chalmers))
- Warhammer Fireborn (with Toby Longworth)
- Warhammer Waiting Death (with Toby Longworth)
- Jago and Litefoot – Main Theme Composer
- Sherlock Holmes – Roger Llewellyn) – Main Theme Composer
- The Last Act – Nicholas Briggs Richard Earl) – Main Theme Composer & Composer
- Holmes and the Ripper – Composer & Main Theme Nicholas Briggs and India Fisher) Richard Earl))

2009

- Doctor Who The Judgement of Isskar (with Peter Davison and Ciara Janson)
- Doctor Who The Chaos Pool (with Peter Davison and Ciara Janson)
- Doctor Who Wirrn Dawn (with Paul McGann and Lucie Miller)
- Doctor Who The Scapegoat (with Paul McGann and Lucie Miller)
- Doctor Who The Magician's Oath (with Paul McGann and Lucie Miller)
- Doctor Who Resistance
- Doctor Who Blue Forgotten Planet (with Colin Baker and India Fisher)
- Doctor Who: Lost Stories The Nightmare Fair (with Colin Baker and Nicola Byrant)
- Doctor Who: Companion Chronicles Bernice Summerfield and the Criminal Code (with Lisa Bowerman)
- Warhammer Thunder From Fenris (with Toby Longworth)
- Warhammer Raven's Flight (with Toby Longworth)
- Warhammer Waiting Death (with Toby Longworth)
- Judge Dredd Stranger Than Truth (with Toby Longworth)

2005

- Beneath the Mask: Portrait of an American Ninja (film)

2006

- HiJab! (written by Robert Cambrinus)
- The Cannibal's Liver – Official Cannes 2007 Selection.

== Filmography (as sound designer) ==
2012

- Warhammer Garro:Sword of Truth (with Toby Longworth and John Banks)
- Doctor Who 1001 Nights (with Peter Davison and Sarah Sutton)
- Doctor Who Night of the Stormcrow (with Tom Baker and Louise Jameson) – Released December 2013, But Subscribers get it December 2012.
- Doctor Who The Renaissance Man (with Tom Baker and Louise Jameson with Ian McNeice
- Doctor Who Destination Nerva (with Tom Baker and Louise Jameson
- Doctor Who The Rosemariners (with Frazer Hines Wendy Padbury
- Doctor Who Black and White (with Sylvester McCoy Sophie Aldred Philip Olivier
- Doctor Who The First Sontarans (with Colin Baker and Nicola Bryant)
- Doctor Who The Fourth Wall (with Colin Baker and Lisa Greenwood)

2011

- Doctor Who The Silver Turk (with Paul McGann and Julie Cox
- Doctor Who Robophobia (with Colin Baker Nicola Walker
- Doctor Who Heroes of Sontar (with Peter Davison Mark Strickson Sarah Sutton
- Doctor Who The Feast of Axos (with Colin Baker)
- Doctor Who Peri and the Piscon Paradox (with Nicola Bryant and Colin Baker)
- Warhammer The Madness Within (with John Banks)
- Warhammer Oath of Moment (with Toby Longworth)

2010

- Doctor Who Relative Dimensions (with Paul McGann Jake McGann Carole Ann Ford Nicky Wardley
- Doctor Who Situation Vacant (with Paul McGann Joe Thomas Nicky Wardley
- Doctor Who Legend of the Cybermen (with Colin Baker)
- Doctor Who The Architects of History (with Sylvester Mccoy and Tracy Childs)
- Warhammer Throne of Lies John Banks and Beth Chalmers))
- Warhammer Fireborn (with Toby Longworth)
- Warhammer Waiting Death (with Toby Longworth)
- Warhammer Oath Of Moment (with Toby Longworth)

2009

- Doctor Who series 3 8th doctor extras (with Paul McGann and Lucie Miller)
- Doctor Who Wirrn Dawn (with Paul McGann and Sheridan Smith)
- Doctor Who Scape Goat (with Paul McGann and Sheridan Smith)
- Doctor Who Blue Forgotten Planet (with Colin Baker and India Fisher)
- Doctor Who: Lost Stories The Nightmare Fair (with Colin Baker and Nicola Byrant)
- Doctor Who: Companion Chronicles Bernice Summerfield and the Criminal Code (with Lisa Bowerman)
- Doctor Who: Companion Chronicles The Magicians Oath
- Doctor Who: Companion Chronicles Resistance
- Warhammer Raven's Flight (with Toby Longworth)
- Warhammer Thunder From Fenris (with Toby Longworth)
- Judge Dredd Stranger Than Truth (with Toby Longworth)

2005

- The Veto Nix: The Last Thousand Years – Futuristic radio play (with Robert Cambrinus)

2007

- Dalek Empire The Fearless: Part Two (with Noel Clarke Maureen O'Brien and Nicholas Briggs)
- Dalek Empire The Fearless: Part Three (with Noel Clarke Maureen O'Brien and Nicholas Briggs)
- Dalek Empire The Fearless: Part Four (with Noel Clarke Maureen O'Brien and Nicholas Briggs)
