= The Destroyer of Delights =

2009 Doctor Who audio drama

Big Finish Productions audio drama
- Series: Doctor Who – The Key 2 Time
- Release no.: 118
- Featuring: Fifth Doctor; Amy
- Written by: Jonathan Clements
- Directed by: Lisa Bowerman
- Produced by: Simon Robinson – Sound Design; Simon Robinson – Music Composer
- Executive producer(s): Nicholas Briggs; Jason Haigh-Ellery
- Production code: 6R/B
- Release date: February 2009

The Destroyer of Delights is a Big Finish Productions audio drama based on the long-running British science fiction television series Doctor Who.

== Plot ==
The search for The Key to Time brings the Doctor to 9th century Sudan, where he meets a treasure-hoarding Djinni.

== Cast ==
- The Doctor – Peter Davison
- Amy – Ciara Janson
- The Black Guardian/Lord Cassim – David Troughton
- Legate of the Caliph – Jason Watkins
- Nisrin – Jess Robinson
- Prince Omar – Bryan Pilkington
- Hassan – Paul Chahidi
- The Djinni – Will Barton
- The Vizier – David Peart

== Notes ==
- In the Whovian timeline, this story takes place between The Judgement of Isskar and The Chaos Pool.
