= Simon Forward =

Simon A. Forward (born 1967, in Penzance) is an English author and dramatist most famous for his work on a variety of Doctor Who spin-offs. He lives and works in Penzance (with his two cats) as a full-time writer.

== Work ==
Forward specialises in sci-fi novels such as Doctor Who. His most recent work is Evil Unlimited for the Kindle. His first published work was the short story One Bad Apple in BBC Books' Doctor Who anthology More Short Trips (BBC Books, 1999). Following this, Simon had a proposal for a Past Doctor Adventure accepted, and the subsequent novel, Drift, was published by BBC Books in 2002.

Having a successful novel behind him, Forward contacted Gary Russell about the possibility of writing for Big Finish's range of audio adventures. The enquiry resulted in him writing the audio play The Sandman (Big Finish, 2002). Simon went on from this to write several short stories for the Big Finish Short Trips volumes, as well two subsequent audio adventures.

Forward wrote the novella Shell Shock (Telos Publishing Ltd., 2003). This was part of their range of Doctor Who novellas and is now out of print. In the same year, Simon also had another Doctor Who novel published by BBC Books, the Eighth Doctor Adventure Emotional Chemistry (BBC Books, 2003).

2009 saw two novelisations of the BBC television series Merlin, followed by a third in 2010.

2010 also saw the independent publication of an original SF Comedy, Evil UnLtd, in ebook form.

In 2016, Forward was invited by editor Andy Frankham-Allen at Candy Jar Books to contribute to the successful "Lethbridge-Stewart" series of authorized spinoff novels, focusing on the DOCTOR WHO character of Brigadier Alistair Gordon Lethbridge-Stewart in the years between his initial meeting with the Doctor (during the television episode "The Web of Fear") and the creation of UNIT. Forward wrote the novel "Blood of Atlantis" (Candy Jar Books, 2016) published as the ninth Lethbridge-Stewart title.
