= Nicole Owen =

UK soap opera character, created 2004

- Hollyoaks character
- Portrayed by: Ciara Janson
- Duration: 2004–2007, 2019
- First appearance: 2 August 2004
- Last appearance: 2 July 2019
- Introduced by: Jo Hallows (2004); Bryan Kirkwood (2007, 2019)
In-universe information
- Father: Rob Owen
- Mother: Carrie Owen
- Brothers: Sam Owen; Russ Owen
- Nephews: Max Owen

Nicole Owen is a fictional character from the British Channel 4 soap opera Hollyoaks, played by Ciara Janson. First appearing in 2004, Janson left the soap on 25 September 2006, making a brief return on 10 July 2007 until she left again on 13 July 2007. In 2019, it was confirmed that Nicole would be returning for her nephew, Max McQueen.

== Storylines ==
=== 2004–2007 ===
Nicole's family had been split when her brother Sam was falsely arrested and convicted for an arson which had killed his girlfriend's younger brother. Their father, Rob, had refused to believe Sam's innocence, and their mother Carrie banished him from their lives. After Russ found out he had testicular cancer, he wanted to contact Rob. They met, and Nicole and Russ began insisting Rob would not be allowed to become part of the family again. After several visits, Rob and Carrie reconciled. Nicole was thrilled, although she wasn't happy about having another parent trying to tell her what to do. Nicole pined for Justin Burton, not realising his stepbrother and her close friend Ali Taylor had feelings for her. Nicole became infatuated with Connor, an Irish traveller who was staying in the village. Connor kissed Nicole on her brother Sam's birthday. the birthday dinner and tried to get her attention. Nicole dismissed him as a puppy, which helped cause a dejected Ali into confronting Stephen "Macki" Mackintosh with a knife. Ali killed Macki in self-defence and was then run over by a car while fleeing the scene. Justin, who had also been at the scene and took the knife, was arrested for Macki's murder.

"A victim of evil sex predator Andy Holt, it's fair to say Nicole didn't have the smoothest of times in Hollyoaks. Her brother Sam also had it in for her, and as the ugly incidents piled up, she decided it was high time to leave."

— Virgin Media describe Nicole's duration. (2011)

Around this time she also befriended Nancy Hayton, who was more experienced and encouraged Nicole to lose her virginity. Nancy let Nicole use her sister Becca's flat, but when the time came, Nicole was unsure and Connor didn't want to push her. Nicole ran out in shame. The next day, she wanted to try again, but Connor was leaving town with his family. Before driving away, he kissed Nicole and told her he would always love her, but didn't maintain contact. Nicole returned to her feelings for Justin. When Justin escaped from prison, Nicole went on the run with him and later gave evidence in his favour at his trial.

In the late night special Hollyoaks: Back from the Dead, Nicole went on a trip with Andy Holt, the serial rapist, as part of a trap for her brothers Sam and Russ Owen. At first he charmed her into thinking he had feelings for her, and nearly made love to her, only to stop because he claimed he wanted her to be better. By the time Nicole realised his true intentions for her, he wouldn't let her leave. Andy forced Nicole to drink the Date rape drug GHB rendering her unconscious. Andy then took her to a warehouse, where he tied and gagged her, before texting pictures of her to Sam to draw them in. Nicole and her brothers were eventually rescued by a vengeful Mel Burton, who pursued the fleeing Andy. Fleeing into the unlit basement, Andy accidentally impaled himself on a spike. Nicole was disgusted when she found out Sam had also been a rapist, and vowed never to speak to him again.

Sam contacted Nicole and she visited him in prison. It was, however, a deception. Sam escaped using her as leverage, and later held his younger sister hostage in the family home and tied her up. After a failed escape attempt, Sam threatened to pour boiling water over Nicole if she didn't tell him where Sophie was. Russ came home and found Nicole, who told him what had happened. Russ raced to The Dog in The Pond but arrived too late - several people were dead, including Russ's girlfriend Sophie. Nicole and Russ both later refused to attend Sam's funeral. Nicole eventually reversed her decision and attended, seeing her parents as the only others there. She sat at the back, emotionless, gave her mother a comforting hand and told her she was sorry her son had died.

In a fury born of abject ignorance, Nicole's peers turned on her because of Sam's crimes. Her groceries were smashed on her way home; a dead rat was stuffed into her school locker. After Ste Hay (Kieron Richardson) and Wayne Tunnicliffe (Joe Marsden) got her drunk with the intent to sleep with her, Nicole decided that enough was enough, and promptly left Hollyoaks with her parents. When her friends Nancy, Sarah and Hannah, who had avoided her after the pub explosion, asked her if she would stay in contact with them, Nicole answered simply 'No'. Nicole returned in December 2006 for Becca Dean's (Ali Bastian) trial where she gave evidence against Becca-much to the annoyance of her supposed friend Nancy. She claimed Justin's stepbrother Ali Taylor (Luti Fagbenle) had told her in 2005 (when Justin was 15) that Becca and Justin were involved. This was hearsay, but still played crucial to the prosecution's case. Becca was ultimately found guilty and sentenced to prison, where she was later killed by another prisoner.

Nicole returned in 2007 for the wedding of Mercedes McQueen and Russ, where she begged her brother to reconsider his choice of bride.

=== 2019 ===
Nicole later returns in 2019 after receiving a call from her nephew, Max, saying that Mercedes doesn't love him and he wants to stay with her in Greece. Mercedes had married Sylver McQueen (David Tag) following Russ' death. After having a catch-up with Nancy, Nicole goes to The Dog to retrieve Max from Mercedes. She refuses, but snaps at Breda McQueen (Moya Brady), saying that she loves her son Bobby Costello (Jayden Fox) more than Max, which he overhears. Breda tells him to leave with Nicole, believing it's the best thing for him, which he does, saying he wishes Russ had never met Mercedes.

In July 2019, Nicole brings Max back to the village where Mercedes, Sylver, Breda and Nana McQueen (Diane Langton) organised a party for him. Mercedes ruined the party after taking cocaine which Liam Donovan (Jude Monk McGown) supplied to her. Max and Nicole left and boarded the next flight back to Greece.
