= Fifth Doctor =

Fictional British TV character

The Doctor
The Fifth Doctor
- Doctor Who character
- Peter Davison as the Fifth Doctor
- First regular appearance: Castrovalva (1982)
- Last regular appearance: The Caves of Androzani (1984)
- Introduced by: John Nathan-Turner
- Portrayed by: Peter Davison
- Preceded by: Tom Baker (Fourth Doctor)
- Succeeded by: Colin Baker (Sixth Doctor)

Information
- Tenure: 4 January 1982 – 16 March 1984
- No of series: 3
- Appearances: 20 stories (69 episodes)
- Companions: Adric; Nyssa; Tegan Jovanka; Vislor Turlough; Kamelion; Peri Brown
- Chronology: Season 19 (1982); Season 20 (1983); Season 21 (1984); Specials (2022)

The Fifth Doctor is an incarnation of the Doctor, the protagonist of the British science fiction television series Doctor Who. He is portrayed by Peter Davison.

Within the series' narrative, the Doctor is a centuries-old alien Time Lord from the planet Gallifrey who travels in time and space in the TARDIS, frequently with companions. At the end of life, the Doctor regenerates; as a result, the physical appearance and personality of the Doctor changes. Preceded in regeneration by the Fourth Doctor (Tom Baker), he is followed by the Sixth Doctor (Colin Baker).

Davison portrays the Fifth Doctor as having a vulnerable side and a tendency towards indecisiveness, dressed as a boyish Edwardian cricketer. He travelled with a host of companions, including boy genius Adric (Matthew Waterhouse), alien aristocrat Nyssa (Sarah Sutton) and Australian flight attendant Tegan Jovanka (Janet Fielding), who had travelled with his previous incarnation. He also shared later adventures alongside devious schoolboy Vislor Turlough (Mark Strickson) and American college student Peri Brown (Nicola Bryant).

== Overview ==
After Tom Baker, the Fourth Doctor, and the BBC had announced that he was leaving the role, the show's producers decided that the next Doctor was to be played by someone who presented something of a physical contrast to Baker and by an actor who was already firmly established in the British public's mind. Peter Davison was chosen due to his high profile role as Tristan Farnon in the BBC series All Creatures Great and Small which had Doctor Who producer John Nathan-Turner as line producer. Davison, who is of half Afro-Guyanese descent, has been credited as the first mixed-race actor to portray the character.

The Fifth Doctor's era was notable for a "back to the basics" attitude, in which "silly" humour (and, to an extent, horror) was kept to a minimum, and more scientific accuracy was encouraged by the producer, John Nathan-Turner. It was, at times, a darker and grittier series, in part for seeing the death of one of his companions, Adric. It was also notable for the reintroduction of many of the Time Lord's enemies, such as The Master, Cybermen, Omega, the Black and White Guardians, and the Silurians.

== Biography ==
The Fourth Doctor was seriously injured after falling off the Pharos Project Radio Telescope so he merged with a future incarnation of himself called the Watcher and regenerated into his new youthful fifth incarnation. The regeneration was difficult, and nearly failed, with the Doctor briefly taking on personality aspects from his four previous incarnations. After recovering in the fictional city Castrovalva, he continued his travels with Adric, Tegan Jovanka and Nyssa. Initially his travels centred on getting Tegan back to Heathrow Airport in time for her first day as an airhostess, but the TARDIS repeatedly missed this destination and Tegan eventually decided to stay in the TARDIS. After trips to the future and the past encountering villains such as Monarch and the Mara, the Fifth Doctor was confronted with tragedy when Adric died trying to stop a space freighter from crashing into prehistoric Earth (Earthshock).

Following Adric's death, the TARDIS accidentally arrived at Heathrow airport (Time-Flight). Here the Doctor and Nyssa left Tegan assuming she would want to stay. The Doctor and Nyssa then travelled together for an unspecified amount of time before the renegade Time Lord Omega, attempting to return to the universe, temporally bonded himself to the Doctor (Arc of Infinity). Faced with this threat, the Time Lords were forced to attempt executing the Doctor, but he eventually tracked Omega to Amsterdam where he defeated him and re-encountered Tegan, who having now lost her job, had no second thoughts about rejoining the TARDIS crew.

When the Doctor met a new companion, an alien boy stranded on Earth by the name of Vislor Turlough, he did not know that Turlough had been commissioned by the Black Guardian to kill him. Soon after, Nyssa left to help cure Lazar's Disease on the space station Terminus. After meeting the entities known as Eternals racing in yacht-like spacecraft for the prize of "Enlightenment", Turlough broke free from the Black Guardian's influence, and continued to travel with the Doctor and Tegan. Landing in the reign of King John (The King's Demons), the crew again encountered the Master, who was using a shape-shifting robot Kamelion to impersonate the King. However, the Doctor helped Kamelion to regain his free will and the robot joined him in his travels, although he rarely left the TARDIS. The Doctor met three of his previous incarnations when they were summoned to the Death Zone on Gallifrey by president Borusa, who was attempting to gain Rassilon's secret of immortality.

After further adventures in which the Doctor re-encountered old foes, including the Silurians and the Sea Devils (Warriors of the Deep), both Tegan and Turlough left the TARDIS. Tegan would find the death and violence they encountered on their travels too much to bear (Resurrection of the Daleks), and Turlough returned to his home planet of Trion in the company of his younger brother, as well as other exiles of Trion, from the planet Sarn. The Doctor was eventually forced to destroy Kamelion, when the Master used his mental connection to the robot to regain control of him, a process the robot realised was irreversible (Planet of Fire).

Ultimately (The Caves of Androzani), the Fifth Doctor and his last companion Peri Brown were exposed to the drug spectrox in its deadly toxic raw form on Androzani Minor. With only one dose of the antidote available, he sacrifices his own existence to save Peri, expressing doubt for the first time that regeneration might be possible this time, then regenerating into the Sixth Doctor.

The Fifth Doctor meets the Tenth Doctor.

A sketch of the Fifth Doctor is seen in John Smith's book in the new series episode "Human Nature" (2007). Visions of the Fifth Doctor, alongside other past Doctors appear in "The Next Doctor" (2008) and "The Eleventh Hour" (2010).

Somewhere in his life he crashed his TARDIS into the TARDIS of the Tenth Doctor and consequently nearly opened a "Belgium-sized" black hole because of the paradox caused, which the Tenth Doctor also uses to explain the notably aged appearance of his former self. However, the Tenth Doctor, remembering the event, knew how to stop it because he recalled watching himself correct the mistake when he was the Fifth Doctor. ("Time Crash")

When entering the Doctor's time stream in "The Name of the Doctor", Clara Oswald saves the Fifth Doctor from the Great Intelligence having entered his time stream.

At another unknown point in his life, the Fifth Doctor piloted his TARDIS along with the rest of his first 13 incarnations to freeze Gallifrey in a single moment in time and save it from the extinction-level aftermath of the Time War ("The Day of the Doctor")

An aged Fifth Doctor appeared as one of the “Guardians of the Edge” in an afterlife, inside the Doctor’s mind in the final Thirteenth Doctor special, to the Thirteenth Doctor as well as being a hologram programmed by the Doctor herself in ("The Power of the Doctor") (2022). He also appeared as a hologram to an older Tegan and he said he never forgot her.

== Costume ==
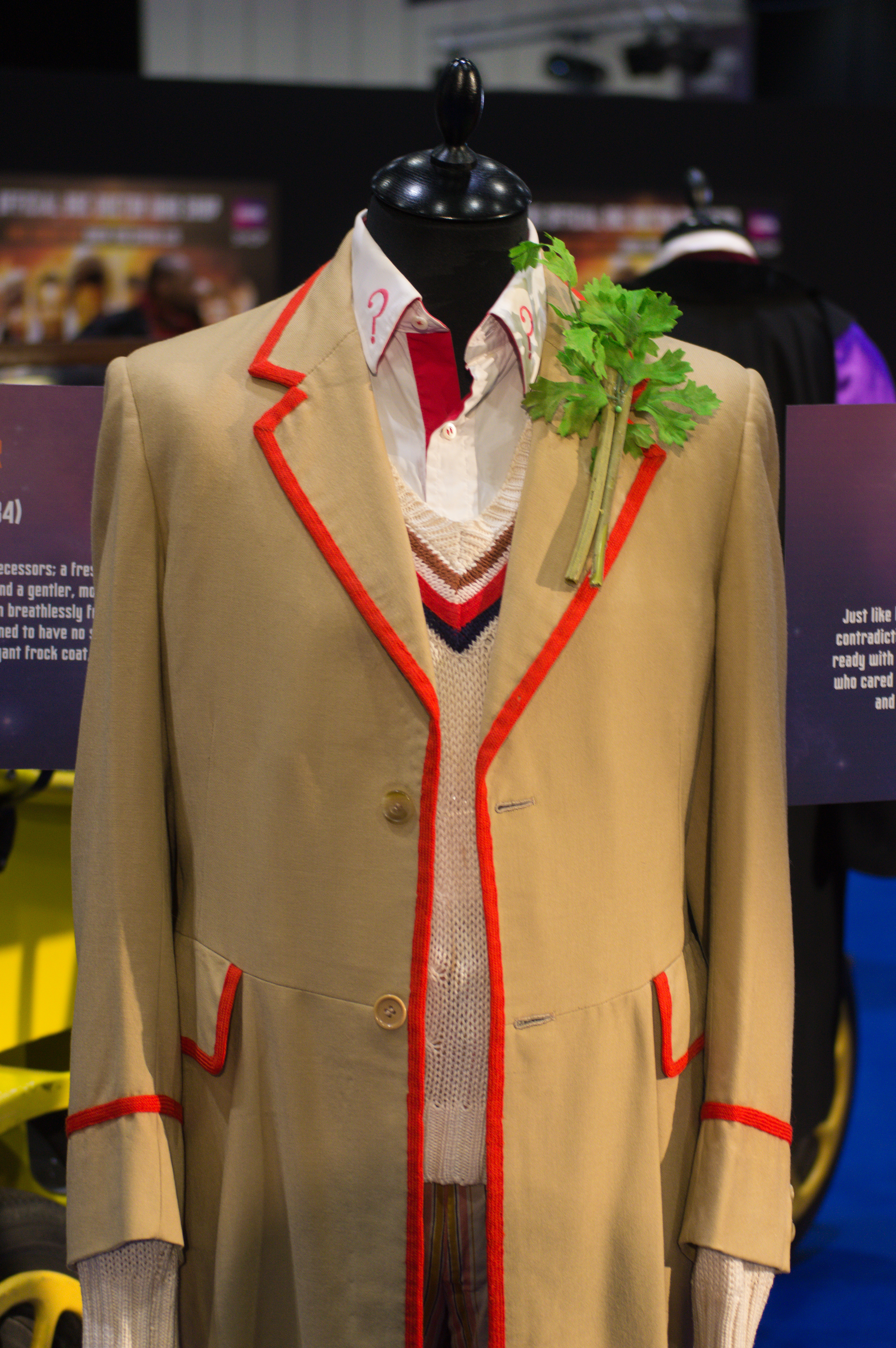
The Fifth Doctor's costume

The Fifth Doctor's chosen mode of dress was a variation of an Edwardian cricketer's kit, and he was even seen to carry a cricket ball in one of his pockets. He wore a cream-coloured frock coat, striped trousers, plimsoll shoes, and occasionally a pair of spectacles. He frequently wore an optimo-style Panama hat that had a red band with a black and white pattern, which he would roll up and place in an inside coat pocket. The Tenth Doctor, who inherited various traits from this incarnation such as spectacle use, revealed in "Time Crash" that the spectacles were not actually needed to aid the Doctor's eyesight but were just for show to make him look clever, although in Four to Doomsday, he makes a remark about being a bit short-sighted in one eye when questioned about the contents of his pockets, which included the aforementioned cricket ball, a book, actually The TARDIS Manual and a magnifying glass. The Fifth Doctor's costume also retained red question marks embroidered onto the collar, which producer John Nathan-Turner added to the Fourth Doctor's costume in 1980. The Fifth Doctor displayed an unusually acute sense of taste in Planet of Fire, also inherited by the Tenth Doctor, Eleventh Doctor and the Thirteenth Doctor.

On his left lapel, this Doctor wore a celery stalk. He claimed in The Caves of Androzani that the celery would turn purple in the presence of certain gases in the "Praxis" range to which he was allergic, although this allergy was not mentioned by any incarnations before or since. He said that if that happened, he would then eat the celery, adding "if nothing else, I'm sure it's good for my teeth." In the same story, while attempting to revive a feverish Peri from spectrox toxaemia, he had noted that celery was an "excellent restorative from where I come from," but that the human olfactory system was "comparatively feeble." Supporting this assertion, in the 2010 episode "Cold Blood", the Eleventh Doctor asks if there is any celery handy after being subjected to a decontamination process intended for humans. The Tenth Doctor poked fun at the celery in "Time Crash", describing it as a "decorative vegetable".

Peter Davison stated in an interview on the DVD of Castrovalva that he thought the clothes he wore were far too "designed" and that he would have still kept them, but wanted to add some individual flair to them, as other actors portraying the Doctor have done in the past. In an interview with BBC Breakfast in July 2011, Davison stated that the cricket jumper was his idea, as the producers wanted something that conveyed both action and eccentricity.

During production of the mini-episode "Time Crash", it was necessary to reassemble the Fifth Doctor's costume; this was accomplished through borrowing various items from the Doctor Who exhibition in Blackpool; knitting a new cricket sweater; procuring a new hat with the original band added; and Davison wearing the trousers that were originally altered for Colin Baker in the final scene of The Caves of Androzani.

== Appearances ==
The Fifth Doctor was first seen on television in the last episode of Logopolis, broadcast on 21 March 1981. Davison played the role through the 19th and 20th seasons of Doctor Who, including the 20th anniversary special "The Five Doctors". Patrick Troughton (who had played the Second Doctor) reportedly advised Davison to move on from the role after three years to avoid becoming typecast, and acting on this advice Davison informed producer John Nathan-Turner that he would leave after the 21st season. In a break from recent tradition, Nathan-Turner decided to regenerate the Doctor in the season's penultimate story, to introduce the Sixth Doctor to audiences before the seasonal break. Davison's last regular appearance as the Fifth Doctor was in the last episode of The Caves of Androzani, broadcast on 16 March 1984.

Davison returned to the role briefly in the 1993 charity special Dimensions in Time. Beginning in 1999, he recorded a series of Doctor Who radio dramas for Big Finish Productions. In 2007, Davison, at the age of 56, appeared alongside Tenth Doctor David Tennant in a Doctor Who special for Children in Need, written by Steven Moffat and titled "Time Crash".

Images of the Fifth Doctor are shown, alongside other incarnations, in the episodes "The Next Doctor" (2008) and "The Eleventh Hour" (2010). He also appears in "The Day of the Doctor" (2013), via archival clips.

In 2022, Davison returned to play The Fifth Doctor in the form of a AI hologram of The Doctor where he was reunited with his former companion Tegan Jovanka, and as a fragmented projection of The Doctor's psyche in "The Power of the Doctor" alongside the Sixth Doctor, Seventh Doctor and Eighth Doctor. In 2023, Davison returned to the role again in Tales of the TARDIS, when he and Tegan were reunited a second time to remember the events of the serial Earthshock and to emotionally overcome the death of their friend Adric. In all three of these appearances, the character appeared to have aged.

The Fifth Doctor has also appeared in officially licensed novels, short stories and comics.

=== Non-television appearances ===
==== Short stories ====
- "Birth of a Renegade" by Eric Saward, Doctor Who 20th Anniversary Special
- "Fascination" by David J. Howe, Virgin's "Decalog"
- "Lackaday Express" by Paul Cornell, "Decalog"
- "Lonely Days" by Daniel Blythe, "Decalog 2: Lost Property"
- "Past Reckoning" by Jackie Marshall, "Decalog 3: Consequences"
- "Zeitgeist" by Craig Hinton, "Decalog 3: Consequences"
- "The Parliament of Rats" by Daniel O'Mahony, "Short Trips"
- "The Eternity Contract" by Steve Lyons, "More Short Trips"
- "Hot Ice" by Christopher Bulis, "More Short Trips"
- "A Town Called Eternity" by Lance Parkin and Mark Clapham, "Short Trips and Sidesteps"
- "Sagittarius: Five Card Draw" by Todd Green, "Short Trips: Zodiac"
- "Hearts of Stone" by Steve Lyons, "Short Trips: Companions"
- "Qualia" by Stephen Fewell, "Short Trips: Companions"
- "The Canvey Angels" by David Bailey, "Short Trips: Companions"
- "The Comet's Tail" by John Binns, "Short Trips: A Universe of Terrors"
- "Long Term" by Andrew Campbell, "Short Trips: A Universe of Terrors"
- "Soul Mate" by David Bailey, "Short Trips: A Universe of Terrors"
- "Erato: Confabula" by Ian Potter, Short Trips: The Muses
- "Clio: The Glass Princess" by Justin Richards, "Short Trips: The Muses"
- "Light at the End of the Tunnel" by Mark Wright, "Short Trips: Steel Skies"
- "No Exit" by Kate Orman, "Short Trips: Steel Skies"
- "Greenaway" by Peter Anghelides, "Short Trips: Steel Skies"
- "The Immortals" by Simon Guerrier, "Short Trips: Past Tense"
- "Graham Dilley Saves The World" by Iain McLaughlin and Claire Bartlett, in Short Trips: Past Tense
- "White Man's Burden" by John Binns, "Short Trips: Past Tense"
- "Observation" by Ian Farrington, "Short Trips: Life Science"
- "Lant Land" by Jonathan Morris, "Short Trips: Life Science"
- "The Gangster's Story" by Jon de Burgh Miller, "Short Trips: Repercussions"
- "The Juror's Story" by Eddie Robson, "Short Trips: Repercussions"
- "The Assassin's Story" by Andrew Collins, "Short Trips: Repercussions"
- "Flashpoint" by Matt Grady, "Short Trips: Monsters"
- "Categorical Imperative" by Simon Guerrier, "Short Trips: Monsters"
- "Not So Much a Programme, More a Way of Life" by Anthony Keetch, "Short Trips: Monsters"
- "Artificial Intelligence" by Andy Campbell, "Short Trips: 2040"
- "In the TARDIS: Christmas Day" by Val Dougla, "Short Trips: A Christmas Treasury"
- "Never Seen Cairo" by Darren Sellars, "Short Trips: A Christmas Treasury"
- "Last Minute Shopping" by Neil Perryman, "Short Trips: A Christmas Treasury"
- "The Eight Doctors of Christmas" by Matthew Griffiths, "Short Trips: A Christmas Treasury"
- "Lily" by Jackie Marshall, "Short Trips: A Christmas Treasury"
- "The Feast of Seven... Eight (and Nine)" by Vanessa Bishop, "Short Trips: A Christmas Treasury"

==== Novels ====
===== Virgin New Adventures =====
- Timewyrm: Revelation by Paul Cornell (appears in the Seventh Doctor's subconscious mind, representing his future self's conscience)

===== Virgin Missing Adventures =====
- Goth Opera by Paul Cornell
- The Crystal Bucephalus by Craig Hinton
- Lords of the Storm by David A. McIntee
- The Sands of Time by Justin Richards
- Cold Fusion by Lance Parkin (Appears with the Seventh Doctor)

===== Past Doctor Adventures =====
- The Ultimate Treasure by Christopher Bulis
- Zeta Major by Simon Messingham
- Deep Blue by Mark Morris
- Divided Loyalties by Gary Russell
- Imperial Moon by Christopher Bulis
- The King of Terror by Keith Topping
- Superior Beings by Nick Walters
- Warmonger by Terrance Dicks
- Fear of the Dark by Trevor Baxendale
- Empire of Death by David Bishop

===== Eighth Doctor Adventures =====
- The Eight Doctors by Terrance Dicks
- Seen in the TARDIS mirror in Camera Obscura

===== Telos Doctor Who novellas =====
- Blood and Hope by Iain McLaughlin

===== Penguin Fiftieth Anniversary eBook novellas =====
- Tip of the Tongue by Patrick Ness

==== Comics ====
===== Doctor Who Magazine =====
- The Tides of Time
- Stars Fell on Stockbridge
- The Stockbridge Horror
- Lunar Lagoon
- 4-Dimensional Vistas
- The Moderator
- The Lunar Strangers
- The Curse of the Scarab

===== Doctor Who Yearbook =====
- Blood Invocation

===== IDW series =====
- The Forgotten
- Prisoners of Time

==== Video games ====
- Doctor Who: The First Adventure
- Destiny of the Doctors
- Lego Dimensions

==== Audio ====
- The Sirens of Time (An Adventure related by the Characters the Fifth Doctor (While travelling with Tegan Jovanka & Vislor Turlough, although neither appear directly), the Sixth Doctor and the Seventh Doctor) (1999)
- Phantasmagoria (An Adventure related by the Characters the 5th Doctor & Turlough) (1999)
- The Land of the Dead (An Adventure related by the Characters the 5th Doctor & Nyssa) (2000)
- Red Dawn (An Adventure related by the Characters the 5th Doctor & Peri Brown) (2000)
- Winter for the Adept (An Adventure related by the Characters the 5th Doctor & Nyssa) (2000)
- The Mutant Phase (An Adventure related by the Characters the 5th Doctor & Nyssa) (2000)
- Loups-Garoux (An Adventure related by the Characters the 5th Doctor & Turlough) (2001)
- The Eye of the Scorpion (An Adventure related by the Characters the 5th Doctor, Peri & Erimem) (2001)
- Primeval (An Adventure related by the Characters the 5th Doctor & Nyssa) (2001)
- Excelis Dawns (An Adventure related by the Characters the 5th Doctor, Tegan Jovanka & Turlough) (2002)
- Spare Parts (An Adventure related by the Characters the 5th Doctor & Nyssa) (2002)
- The Church and the Crown (An Adventure related by the Characters the 5th Doctor, Peri & Erimem) (2002)
- Nekromanteia (An Adventure related by the Characters the 5th Doctor, Peri & Erimem) (2003)
- Creatures of Beauty (An Adventure related by the Characters the 5th Doctor & Nyssa) (2003)
- Omega (An Adventure related by the Character the 5th Doctor) (2003)
- Zagreus (An Adventure related by the Character the 5th Doctor) (2003)
- The Axis of Insanity (An Adventure related by the Characters the 5th Doctor, Peri & Erimem) (2004)
- The Roof of the World (An Adventure related by the Characters the 5th Doctor, Peri & Erimem) (2004)
- The Game (An Adventure related by the Characters the 5th Doctor & Nyssa) (2005)
- Three's a Crowd (An Adventure related by the Characters the 5th Doctor, Peri & Erimem) (2005)
- The Council of Nicaea (An Adventure related by the Characters the 5th Doctor, Peri & Erimem) (2005)
- Singularity (An Adventure related by the Characters the 5th Doctor & Turlough) (2005)
- The King Maker (An Adventure related by the Characters the 5th Doctor, Peri & Erimem) (2006)
- The Gathering (An Adventure related by the Characters the 5th Doctor & Tegan) (2006)
- Circular Time (An Adventure related by the Characters the 5th Doctor & Nyssa) (2007)
- Renaissance of the Daleks (An Adventure related by the Characters the 5th Doctor & Nyssa) (2007)
- Exotron (An Adventure related by the Characters the 5th Doctor & Peri) (2007)
- Son of the Dragon (An Adventure related by the Characters the 5th Doctor, Peri & Erimem) (2007)
- The Mind's Eye (An Adventure related by the Characters the 5th Doctor, Peri & Erimem) (2007)
- The Bride of Peladon (An Adventure related by the Characters the 5th Doctor, Peri & Erimem) (2008)
- The Haunting of Thomas Brewster (An Adventure related by the Characters the 5th Doctor, Nyssa & Thomas Brewster) (2008)
- The Boy That Time Forgot (An Adventure related by the Characters the 5th Doctor, Nyssa & Brewster) (2008)
- Time Reef (An Adventure related by the Characters the 5th Doctor, Nyssa & Brewster) (2008)
- The Darkening Eye (An Adventure related by the Character Nyssa) (2008)
- Return to the Web Planet (An Adventure related by the Characters the 5th Doctor & Nyssa) (2008)
- The Judgement of Isskar (An Adventure related by the Characters the 5th Doctor & Amy) (2009)
- The Destroyer of Delights (An Adventure related by the Characters the 5th Doctor & Amy) (2009)
- The Chaos Pool (An Adventure related by the Characters the 5th Doctor & Amy) (2009)
- Castle of Fear (An Adventure related by the Characters the 5th Doctor & Nyssa) (2009)
- Ringpullworld (An Adventure related by the Characters the 5th Doctor, Tegan & Turlough) (2009)
- The Eternal Summer (An Adventure related by the Characters the 5th Doctor & Nyssa) (2009)
- Plague of the Daleks (An Adventure related by the Characters the 5th Doctor & Nyssa) (2009)
- Cobwebs (An Adventure related by the Characters the 5th Doctor, Nyssa, Tegan & Turlough) (2010)
- The Whispering Forest (An Adventure related by the Characters the 5th Doctor, Nyssa, Tegan & Turlough) (2010)
- The Cradle of the Snake (An Adventure related by the Characters the 5th Doctor, Nyssa, Tegan & Turlough) (2010)
- The Four Doctors (An Adventure related by the Character the 5th Doctor) (2010)
- The Demons of Red Lodge and Other Stories (An Adventure related by the Characters the 5th Doctor & Nyssa) (2010)
- Peri and the Piscon Paradox (An Adventure related by the Character Peri) (2011)
- Heroes of Sontar (An Adventure related by the Characters the 5th Doctor, Nyssa, Tegan & Turlough) (2011)
- Kiss of Death (An Adventure related by the Characters the 5th Doctor, Nyssa, Tegan & Turlough) (2011)
- Rat Trap (An Adventure related by the Characters the 5th Doctor, Nyssa, Tegan & Turlough) (2011)
- The Elite (An Adventure related by the Characters the 5th Doctor, Nyssa & Tegan) (2011)
- Hexagora (An Adventure related by the Characters the 5th Doctor, Nyssa & Tegan) (2011)
- The Five Companions (An Adventure related by the Characters the 5th Doctor & Nyssa) (2011)
- The Children of Seth (An Adventure related by the Characters the 5th Doctor, Nyssa & Tegan) (2011)
- The Emerald Tiger (An Adventure related by the Characters the 5th Doctor, Nyssa, Tegan & Turlough) (2012)
- The Jupiter Conjunction (An Adventure related by the Characters the 5th Doctor, Nyssa, Tegan & Turlough) (2012)
- The Butcher of Brisbane (An Adventure related by the Characters the 5th Doctor, Nyssa, Tegan & Turlough) (2012)
- The Burning Prince (An Adventure related by the Character the 5th Doctor) (2012)
- 1001 Nights (An Adventure related by the Characters the 5th Doctor & Nyssa) (2012)
- Eldrad Must Die! (An Adventure related by the Characters the 5th Doctor, Nyssa, Tegan & Turlough) (2013)
- Smoke and Mirrors (An Adventure related by the Character Tegan) (2013)
- The Lady Merica (An Adventure related by the Characters the 5th Doctor, Nyssa, Tegan & Turlough) (2013)
- Prisoners of Fate (An Adventure related by the Characters the 5th Doctor, Nyssa, Tegan & Turlough) (2013)
- 1963: Fanfare for the Common Men (An Adventure related by the Characters the 5th Doctor & Nyssa) (2013)
- The Light at the End (An Adventure related by the Characters the 5th Doctor & Nyssa) (2013)
- Moonflesh (An Adventure related by the Characters the 5th Doctor & Nyssa) (2014)
- Tomb Ship (An Adventure related by the Characters the 5th Doctor & Nyssa) (2014)
- Masquerade (An Adventure related by the Characters the 5th Doctor & Nyssa) (2014)
- The Fifth Doctor Box Set (An Adventure related by the Characters the 5th Doctor, Adric, Nyssa & Tegan) (2014)
  - Psychodrome
  - Iterations of I
- Mistfall (An Adventure related by the Characters the 5th Doctor, Nyssa, Tegan & Turlough) (2015)
- Equilibrium (An Adventure related by the Characters the 5th Doctor, Nyssa, Tegan & Turlough) (2015)
- The Entropy Plague (An Adventure related by the Characters the 5th Doctor, Nyssa, Tegan & Turlough) (2015)
- The Secret History (An Adventure related by the Characters the 5th Doctor, Vicki & Steven Taylor) (2015)
- The Waters of Amsterdam (An Adventure related by the Characters the 5th Doctor, Nyssa & Tegan) (2016)
- Aquitaine (An Adventure related by the Characters the 5th Doctor, Nyssa & Tegan) (2016)
- The Peterloo Massacre (An Adventure related by the Characters the 5th Doctor, Nyssa & Tegan) (2016)
- And You Will Obey Me (An Adventure related by the Character the 5th Doctor) (2016)
- Fallen Angels (An Adventure related by the Character the 5th Doctor) (2016)
- Memory Banks and Other Stories (An Adventure related by the Characters the 5th Doctor & Turlough) (2016)
- Cold Fusion (An Adventure related by the Characters the 5th Doctor, Adric, Nyssa & Tegan) (2016)
- The Star Men (An Adventure related by the Characters the 5th Doctor, Adric, Nyssa & Tegan) (2017)
- The Contingency Club (An Adventure related by the Characters the 5th Doctor, Adric, Nyssa & Tegan) (2017)
- Zaltys (An Adventure related by the Characters the 5th Doctor, Adric, Nyssa & Tegan) (2017)
- Alien Heart/Dalek Soul (An Adventure related by the Characters the 5th Doctor & Nyssa) (2017)
- Empire of the Racnoss (An Adventure related by the Character the 5th Doctor) (2017)
- Time in Office (An Adventure related by the Characters the 5th Doctor, Tegan and Leela) (2017)
- Kingdom of Lies, Ghost Walk and Serpent in the Silver Mask (Adventures related by the Characters the 5th Doctor, Tegan, Nyssa and Adric) (2018)
- The Helliax Rift (An Adventure related by the Character the 5th Doctor) (2018)

=== Short Trips audios ===
- The Deep
- Sock-Pig
- Seven to One
- Wet Walls
- The Lions of Trafalgar by Jason Arnopp
