= Ciara Janson =

English actress

- Born: Surrey, England
- Occupations: Actress, Voice actress, Artist
- Years active: 1989–present
- Known for: 64 Zoo Lane (1999–2000), Hollyoaks (2004-2019), Graceless (2010-2017), Barbie in a Mermaid Tale, (2010)
- Spouse: Måns Zelmerlöw (m. 2019; sep. 2025)
- Children: 3
- Parents: David Janson; Debbie Arnold

Ciara Janson (formerly Janson Zelmerlöw) is an English actress known for playing Nicole Owen in the soap opera Hollyoaks.

== Career ==
Janson performed voice acting work as a child, from the age of 18 months, leading Hobson's International, an acting agency, to launch a children's division. Janson became the youngest child to have a regular radio spot in a show named Victoria when she was five years old.

Janson's first major television work was as Nicole Owen on Hollyoaks. Previous parts include the role of Heidi for a BBC radio drama. She left Hollyoaks in September 2006. Janson made her theatrical debut in Bad Blood at the Key Theatre. She made her West End debut in 2009, playing Louise in New Boy at Trafalgar Studios.

Janson is a regular voice on BBC Three, and her radio credits include Disney's adaptation of The Famous Five and various dramas for BBC Radio 4. She also appeared as the Doctor's companion, Amy, in a trilogy of linked Doctor Who audio dramas, beginning with The Judgement of Isskar. She voiced Lucy in the Millimages animated series 64 Zoo Lane, from 1999 to 2000.

She participated as a celebrity dancer in Let's Dance 2025 broadcast on TV4.

== Filmography ==
=== Television ===
| Year | Title | Role | Notes |
|---|---|---|---|
| 1997–1999 | The Forgotten Toys | Linda | |
| 1999–2000 | 64 Zoo Lane | Lucy | 52 episodes |
| 2004–2007, 2019 | Hollyoaks | Nicole Owen | |
| 2005 | Hollyoaks: No Going Back | Nicole Owen | 5 episodes |
| 2006 | Hollyoaks: Back from the Dead | Nicole Owen | 5 episodes |
| 2006 | Mighty Truck of Stuff | Herself | |
| 2007 | Doctors | Patsy Halliwell | Episode: "Barbie Girls" |
| 2008 | Snog Marry Avoid? | POD (Personal Overhaul Device) | Voice |
| 2011 | Holby City | Zoe Clinton | Episode: "Oliver Twist" |
| 2023 | Masked Singer Sverige | Vikingen (Viking) | Sources: |

=== Film ===
| Year | Title | Role | Notes |
|---|---|---|---|
| 1999 | Faeries | | Voice |
| 2003 | Kaena: The Prophecy | Kamou / Roya | Voice; English dub |
| 2010 | Barbie in A Mermaid Tale | Xylie | Voice |

=== Stage ===
| Year | Title | Role | Notes |
|---|---|---|---|
| 2007 | Bad Blood | Belinda | Key Theatre |
| 2008 | Cinderella | Cinderella | Buxton Opera House |
| 2009 | New Boy | Louise | Trafalgar Studios |
| 2010 | PopStar! The Musical | Belinda | Lighthouse Theatre |

=== Radio ===
| Year | Title | Role | Notes |
|---|---|---|---|
| 1999 | Heidi | Heidi | BBC Radio 4 |
| 2006 | The Tomorrow People: A Plague of Dreams | Annie | |
| 2009 | The Judgement of Isskar; The Destroyer of Delights; The Chaos Pool | Amy | Big Finish Productions |
| 2010–2017 | Graceless (series) | Amy/Abby (13 audiodramas) | Big Finish Productions |
| 2015 | The Archive | Abby | Big Finish Productions |
| 2020 | Wicked Sisters (anthology) | Abby | Big Finish Productions |

== Personal life ==
She was married to Swedish singer, Eurovision Song Contest 2015 winner and presenter Måns Zelmerlöw. They became engaged in late 2017. In December 2017, Zelmerlöw revealed to Swedish press that the couple were expecting a child together. A few weeks later he confirmed that they would be having a baby boy. The couple welcomed Albert on 25 May 2018. Janson also has a son (Archie) from a previous relationship. They were married on 5 September 2019 and live in London. On 9 August 2022, it was announced on Instagram that she had given birth to her third son, second with Zelmerlöw, Ossian Matteus Zelmerlöw. In March 2025, Janson filed for divorce and reported physical abuse to the Swedish police, according to Aftonbladet: Ciara said in court in 2025 that she had found cocaine in the couple's shared home several times, according to Expressen.
