= Kaena: The Prophecy =

- French theatrical release poster
- Directed by: Chris Delaporte; Pascal Pinon
- Written by: Patrick Daher; Chris Delaporte; Tarik Hamdine
- Produced by: Marc du Pontavice
- Starring: Kirsten Dunst; Richard Harris; Anjelica Huston; Keith David; Ciara Janson
- Edited by: Bénédicte Brunet
- Music by: Farid Russlan
- Production companies: StudioCanal; Xilam Animation
- Distributed by: BAC Films
- Release date: June 4, 2003
- Running time: 85 minutes
- Country: France
- Languages: French, English
- Budget: $26 million
- Box office: $465,618

Kaena: The Prophecy (French: Kaena: La prophétie) is a 2003 French adult animated fantasy adventure film produced by Xilam.

Chris Delaporte started work on the film in 1995 after leaving at Éric Chahi's company Amazing Studio halfway through development of the Studio's only game Heart of Darkness. Originally intended as a video game, the project spun off into a multimedia project.

Kaena was released theatrically in France by BAC Films on June 4, 2003, and was later dubbed into English, with Columbia TriStar Pictures handling US distribution through Destination Films. The English dub features the voices of Kirsten Dunst, Richard Harris (in his last role before his death), Anjelica Huston, Keith David and Ciara Janson. The film received generally negative reviews from critics, who criticized its story, although its animation was praised.

== Plot ==
An alien ship crash lands on a desert planet. The alien survivors, known as Vecarians, are quickly killed by the planet's predatory native inhabitants, the Selenites. The ship's core, Vecanoi, survives, and from it sprouts Axis, a massive tree reaching up into space.

600 years later, a race of human-like tree-dwellers have evolved living in the branches of Axis. One of them, a teenager named Kaena (voiced by Kirsten Dunst), is an adventurous daydreamer who longs to explore the world beyond the confines of her village. Kaena's inquisitiveness is opposed as heresy by the village elder, who commands his people to stay productive and toil for the villager's gods (who are, unbeknownst to them, the Selenites living in the planet below).

Led by prophetic dreams of a world with a blue sun and plentiful water, Kaena eventually defies the elder and climbs to the top of Axis. There, she encounters the ancient alien Opaz (voiced by Richard Harris), the last survivor of the Vecarian race that crash landed on the planet centuries ago. Opaz has used his technology to evolve a race of intelligent worms to serve him and help him escape the planet. Upon learning of Kaena's dreams, Opaz enlists her help in retrieving Vecanoi, which contains the collective memory of his people.

However, Vecanoi rests at the base of Axis, where the Selenites dwell. The Queen of the Selenites (voiced by Anjelica Huston) blames Vecanoi for the destruction of their planet, and has spent most of her life (and sacrificed the future of her people) attempting to destroy it.

== Cast ==
=== French cast ===
- Cécile de France as Kaena
- Michael Lonsdale as Opaz
- Victoria Abril as La reine
- Jean Piat as Le prêtre

=== English cast ===
- Kirsten Dunst as Kaena
- Richard Harris as Opaz
- Anjelica Huston as Queen of the Selenites
- Keith David as Voxem
- Michael McShane as Assad
- Greg Proops as Gommy
- Tom Kenny as Zehos
- Tara Strong as Essy
- Dwight Schultz as Ilpo
- John DiMaggio as Enode
- Ciara Janson as Kamou, Roya
- Jennifer Darling as Reya
- Cornell John as Demok
- Gary Martin as The Priest
- William Attenborough as Sambo

== Production ==
The project started as a video game in 1995. The crew did not develop its own software. Instead they used already existing tools like Alienbrain and the 2.5 version of 3ds Max render.

== Reception ==
Kaena was a box office bomb and earned highly negative reviews. The New York Times, Entertainment Weekly, The L.A. Times and The Boston Globe all said that it was lifeless and dull with an overly convoluted plot. There were unflattering comparisons to a much better-received French animated film, The Triplets of Belleville, and the similarly unsuccessful CG film Final Fantasy: The Spirits Within. A few nevertheless admired the visuals. The proportions of the main character drew comparisons to Lara Croft.

On Rotten Tomatoes, the film has an approval rating of 7% based on 30 reviews, with an average rating of 3.90/10. The site's critical consensus reads, "Though Kaena: The Prophecy is visually inventive, its story is incoherent, derivative, and dull." On Metacritic, the film has a score of 40 out of 100 based on 15 critics, indicating "mixed or average reviews".

== Video game ==
A video game based on the film, simply titled Kaena, was developed by Xilam and published by Namco for the PlayStation 2 on April 15, 2004. It was released only in Japan in limited quantities, with a completed English localized version being unreleased despite being marketed in North America.
