= The Chaos Pool =

2009 British sci-fi audio drama

Big Finish Productions audio drama
- Series: Doctor Who – The Key 2 Time
- Release no.: 119
- Featuring: Fifth Doctor; Amy
- Written by: Peter Anghelides
- Directed by: Lisa Bowerman
- Produced by: Simon Robinson – Sound Design; Jamie Robertson – Music Composer
- Executive producers: Nicholas Briggs; Jason Haigh-Ellery
- Production code: 6R/C
- Release date: March 2009

The Chaos Pool is a 2009 Big Finish Productions audio drama based on the long-running British science fiction television series Doctor Who. It stars Peter Davison as The Doctor and also features Lalla Ward.

== Plot ==
Chaos and Order, old friends and old enemies and beginning and end of time come head to head at the conclusion of the search for The Key to Time.

== Reception ==
A review in Den of Geek commended Davison's performance, but critiqued the writing and character development in Episode Two.

== Cast ==
- The Doctor – Peter Davison
- Amy – Ciara Janson
- Zara – Laura Doddington
- Astra of Atrios / Romana – Lalla Ward
- The Black Guardian – David Troughton
- The White Guardian – Jason Watkins (uncredited)
- Captain Pargrave – Ben Jones
- Commander Hectocot – Toby Longworth
- The Voice – Cate Hamer

== Notes ==
- In the Whovian timeline, this story takes place between The Destroyer of Delights and Peri and the Piscon Paradox.
