= Barbie in a Mermaid Tale =

- DVD cover
- Directed by: Adam L. Wood
- Written by: Elise Allen
- Produced by: Anita Lee; Tiffany J. Shuttleworth
- Starring: Kelly Sheridan; Kathleen Barr; Tabitha St. Germain; Nicole Oliver; Emma Pierson; Ciara Janson; Nakia Burrise; Maryke Hendrikse; Garry Chalk
- Music by: BC Smith
- Production companies: Mattel Entertainment; Rainmaker Entertainment
- Distributed by: Universal Studios Home Entertainment
- Release date: March 9, 2010
- Running time: 74 minutes
- Countries: United States; Canada
- Language: English

Barbie in a Mermaid Tale is a 2010 CGI-animated adventure film directed by Adam L. Wood and produced by Mattel Entertainment with Rainmaker Entertainment. It was released to DVD on March 9, 2010, and later made its television premiere on Nickelodeon on April 4, 2010. The seventeenth entry in the Barbie film series, it was followed by a 2012 sequel, Barbie in a Mermaid Tale 2. It revolves around Merliah Summers, a surfing champion who learns she is a mermaid princess and sets out for an underwater adventure to save her long-lost mother, the queen of an ocean kingdom.

== Official description ==
"Barbie stars as Merliah, a surfing champion from Malibu. One minute she's a normal teenager and the next she learns a shocking family secret: she's a mermaid! Merliah and her dolphin friend Zuma set off on an undersea adventure to rescue her mother, the queen of Oceana. With help from her new mermaid friends, Merliah saves the ocean kingdom. In the end, she discovers what makes you different can also be your greatest strength."

== Plot ==
Merliah Summers is a young, up-and-coming surfing star in Malibu. While participating in a competition, Merliah loses concentration when her hair spontaneously gains pink streaks, causing her to wipe out. While underwater, she discovers that she is able to breathe, and is approached by a talking, pink bottlenose dolphin named Zuma. Shocked by this turn of events, Merliah tells her grandfather Break what happened. Break explains that Merliah's mother is a mermaid and that Merliah was given to Break as a baby to raise because she was born with legs. Merliah leaves in disbelief.

After telling her friends Fallon and Hadley the story, Zuma appears to the girls, confirming that Merliah is half-mermaid. Zuma explains to Merliah that her mother is Calissa, the previous queen of the underwater kingdom of Oceana. Oceana's current queen, Eris, Calissa's sister, is a tyrant who took the throne when Calissa went missing years earlier; Zuma hopes that Merliah will claim her birthright and usurp Eris. Merliah refuses, and in her anger throws the necklace she'd been wearing since she was an infant. The smashed pendant reveals a magical image of Calissa, confirming that she is alive. Merliah agrees to go to Oceana in the hopes that Calissa can make her normal again.

On the way to Oceana, Zuma explains that the ocean is weakening due to Eris being unskilled at spinning Merillia—a magical substance that sustains the ocean. Merliah and Zuma sneak into Oceana during an Eris festival, wherein Eris distributes Merillia in exchange for the citizens' adoration. In reality, the Merillia is spun by Calissa, who is imprisoned in the palace dungeon.

With the help of mermaids Kayla and Xylie, Merliah's legs are disguised with a fake tail. The group visit the Destinies, three mermaids with prophetic powers. The Destinies tell Merliah that she needs to collect three items to succeed in overthrowing Eris: the Celestial Comb, a Dreamfish, and Eris' protective necklace. The group search for the items, occasionally calling Fallon and Hadley for help with research. They find the Celestial Comb in an underwater cave and the Dreamfish in the Adenato currents.

To obtain Eris' necklace, Merliah, Kayla, and Xylie approach her during the next Eris festival and perform a song and dance to distract her. Merliah grabs Eris' necklace, but soon has her tail pulled off, revealing her legs. In a rage, Eris creates a whirlpool to banish Merliah to the deepest trench in the ocean. Trapped inside the whirlpool, Merliah calls the Dreamfish for help. The Dreamfish offers to grant Merliah's deepest wish and send her back to Malibu and erase her mermaid half for good. Merliah rejects the wish and accepts her responsibility as the princess of Oceana, gaining a real mermaid tail which she uses to escape the whirlpool herself. Merliah reveals her identity to the people of Oceana, brandishing the Celestial Comb as proof. Eris rushes Merliah; and after a chase, Merliah lures and traps Eris in the whirlpool.

Merliah finds and sets Calissa free. Calissa is made queen once again, and, now able to spin Merillia at full strength, restores Oceana to its former glory. Merliah confesses that she misses her life as a human, and Calissa gives her a magical necklace that enables her to be a human or mermaid whenever she wishes. Merliah then returns to land, where she is reunited with her grandfather and wins the surfing competition.

== Cast ==
- Merliah Summers is a girl from Malibu nicknamed "Queen of the Waves", and is the mermaid princess of Oceana. Her father was a human, but her mother the queen of the mermaids. Her father died when she was a baby, so her mother Queen Calissa gave Merliah to her grandfather to raise, thinking that she will be safer on land than in the ocean. She is a cool, modern and a little bit sassy girl.
- Zuma is a pink bottlenose dolphin who shows Merliah around the ocean kingdom and helps her save Calissa.
- Fallon is one of Merliah's best friends (played by Grace). She's sassy, outspoken and a little bit sarcastic, but she's a loyal, helpful and great friend.
- Hadley is Merliah's other best friend (played by Teresa). She's prone to daydream. She is imaginative, funny and silly. Her personality makes her the first one to believe that Merliah is half-mermaid.
- Kayla and Xylie are best friends and super-stylish mermaids. They own a luxurious boutique under the sea where Merliah gets a mermaid makeover.
- Snouts is a sea lion pup who works with Kayla and Xylie.
- Calissa is Merliah's mother. She was the Queen regnant of Oceana, until her evil younger sister, Eris, stole the throne from her.
- Eris is the sister of Calissa and aunt of Merliah. She is the one who overthrew Calissa and became their new evil queen. Everyone in the kingdom is afraid of her. The main antagonist of the film.
- Break Summers is Merliah's grandfather and Calissa's father-in-law. He is the one who raised Merliah and told her about her past.
- The Destinies are three girls named Dee, Deanne and Deandra who own a hair salon and can also see the future. They tell Merliah the three tools she needs to defeat Eris and restore Oceana.
- Remo is a yellow and green leafy sea dragon who is Eris' sidekick. Remo is constantly abused by Eris, and leads Merliah to where Calissa is held as soon as Eris is defeated.

== Cast ==
- Kelly Sheridan as the speaking voice of Merliah Summers
  - Melissa Lyons as the singing voice of Merliah
- Kathleen Barr as Eris/Snouts
- Tabitha St. Germain as Zuma/Deanne
- Nakia Burrise as Fallon
- Maryke Hendrikse as Hadley
- Emma Pierson as Kayla
- Ciara Janson as Xylie
- Garry Chalk as Break Summers
- Nicole Oliver as Calissa
- Alistair Abell as Remo/Pufferazzi
- Andrea Libman as Dee
- Shannon Chan-Kent as Deandra
- Alex Ferris as Dreamfish
- Ellen Kennedy as Lipstick Fish/Syrenka
- Peter Mel as Surf Announcer
- Scott McNeil as Syrenka's Pet Fish

== See also ==
- List of Barbie films
