= Sometime Never... =

2004 novel by Justin Richards

- Author: Justin Richards
- Series: Doctor Who book: Eighth Doctor Adventures
- Release number: 67
- Subject: Featuring: Eighth Doctor; Fitz, Trix, Miranda
- Publisher: BBC Books
- Publication date: January 2004
- Pages: 288
- ISBN: 0-563-48611-2
- Preceded by: Emotional Chemistry
- Followed by: Halflife

Sometime Never... is a BBC Books original novel written by Justin Richards and based on the long-running British science fiction television series Doctor Who. It features the Eighth Doctor, Fitz, Trix, and Miranda.

== Plot summary ==
The Council of Eight have set plans for all of time and space. The Doctor's travels are causing difficulties for this plan, so the Council sets off to attack him, and his dear friends.

== Continuity ==
The epilogue of the novel offers a possible explanation to the fan asked question of how the Doctor can still exist after the destruction of Gallifrey in The Ancestor Cell. In that novel, time is reversed to stop Gallifrey or the Time Lords from ever existing, provoking confusion among fans. This novel shows the Doctor giving one of the council of Eight (Soul) some of his life energy to keep him alive. When Soul and Miranda's daughter Zezanne leave in Sabbath's time ship (the Jonah), Soul takes on the form of an old man who resembles the First Doctor. They both lose their memories, but believe they are the First Doctor and Susan. The Jonah arrives, disguised as a Police Box in 1963, with Octan's Starkiller (replacing the Hand of Omega). This potentially retcons the entire series, giving an alternative explanation to the Doctor's origins without the Time Lords.

This however contradicts the revelations about Gallifrey's destruction in The Gallifrey Chronicles, where it is revealed that while Gallifrey was destroyed, the Time Lords were not erased from history. However, the cataclysm set up an event horizon in time that prevented anyone from entering Gallifrey's relative past or travelling from it to the present or future. The Time Lords also survived within the Matrix, which had been downloaded into the Eighth Doctor's mind, with the intention of restoring the Time Lords and Gallifrey.

== Continuity ==
- While talking to the image of the Master, the Doctor mentions that "Somewhere... the tea will be getting cold", a reference to the Seventh Doctor's final speech in Survival.
- In the end of this novel Jo Grant is seen alive and well, indicating that all the companions that the Council of Eight killed have returned to their normal time lines.

== Notes ==
- Sabbath's allies were originally Daleks, but legal issues prevented this and the Council of Eight were a last-minute replacement. This means that the black eye sun mentioned in earlier novels, originally meant to tie in with the revelation of Sabbath's allies being Daleks, has not been explained. However, it is implied that the Daleks are watching Soul and Zezanne leaving the station, hinting at a new version of Remembrance of the Daleks.
