= Bad Dinosaurs =

Children's animated television program

Bad Dinosaurs is a children's animated television series about a family of dinosaurs, which was released on Netflix on March 28, 2024.

== History ==
Bad Dinosaurs is based on the web series Dinosaurs: Terrible Lizards, which was first published on YouTube in 2015. It was created by Joel Veitch, Alex Mallinson, and David Shute.

In 2022, the series was announced by Netflix Animation, to be developed for television by the production company Snafu Pictures. The series was cancelled after one season. However, in September 2026, the series was renewed for two additional seasons.

== Production ==
After a period of funded development, production began in early 2022. The series was directed by Simone Giampaolo. Joel Veitch was the showrunner, the head writer was Natt Tapley, and David Shute remained on the writing team.

The score was composed by Jamie Robertson.
