= Emotional Chemistry =

2003 novel by Simon A. Forward

- Author: Simon A. Forward
- Series: Doctor Who book: Eighth Doctor Adventures
- Release number: 66
- Subject: Featuring: Eighth Doctor; Fitz, Trix
- Publisher: BBC Books
- Publication date: October 2003
- Pages: 288
- ISBN: 0-563-48608-2
- Preceded by: Timeless
- Followed by: Sometime Never...

Emotional Chemistry is a BBC Books original novel written by Simon A. Forward and based on the long-running British science fiction television series Doctor Who. It features the Eighth Doctor, Fitz and Trix.

The novel is written as a love story between two aliens separated by time, and is set in three distinct time periods: 1812, 2024 and the year 5000. The sections set in the 51st Century in particular contain references to the Doctor Who serial The Talons of Weng-Chiang, showing the war that villain Magnus Greel had started before trying to escape through time.

== Plot ==
The TARDIS crew arrive in the Kremlin Museum, looking for a locket that may help to reveal the nature of Sabbath's plans. However, they find the museum being ransacked by two soldiers from the future. One is overpowered, and the other escapes to the future, taking the Doctor with him.

In the present day, Colonel Grigoriy Bugayev (of the Russian branch of UNIT) is investigating the thefts, and suspects corrupt businessman Vladimir Garudin. He also knows of the Doctor, and thinks that his companions may be able to help him. However, he doesn't search Trix properly, and fails to discover that she has stolen the locket the Doctor was searching for.

The Doctor and the future soldier arrive in 5000 with a painting of a Russian noblewoman, which his captor insists on taking to his commander, Lord General Razum Kinzhal. Kinzhal himself has been captured by enemy forces, but manages to complete a daring escape that leaves him in the Arctic wilderness with his second-in-command, Angel, who loves him dearly.

In 1812, as Alexander Vishenkov prepares to head off to face the French with his friend Captain Victor Padorin, he is given the diamond locket as a token of affection by Dusha. He loves her dearly, but is troubled by lustful feelings he has started to have for her younger sister. Dusha, meanwhile, worries about her two sisters, whom the notorious lecher Padorin seems to have set his sights on.

As Trix and Fitz are escorted to Bugayev's HQ, he tells them that the collection of artefacts they were raiding seem to have a strange effect on the public; in part, they were displayed to study that effect. They are interrupted, however, when the convoy is attacked by a group of apparently possessed locals. Fitz finds himself possessed by the same force, and compelled to leave the safety on the convoy. The future soldier, meanwhile, recovers and forces Trix to aid his escape. As she drives them away from the convoy, she is surprised by a woman on horseback and crashes the vehicle.

The Doctor and his soldier stumble across a bunker where a group are plotting to betray and execute Kinzhal. As the soldier grows more enraged by this, a mysterious fire breaks out from around the picture and kills everyone in the bunker. The Doctor is intrigued by this apparent pyrokinetic ability.

Fitz is marched by his controlling force to the office of Victor Garudin, and then released: it is clear that Garudin himself was controlling them. He is after the Doctor's TARDIS, and fearing for his life Fitz admits that he will sell the Doctor out happily if he is rewarded suitably. Garudin shows Fitz his own personal time machine, Misl Vremnya or "Thought Time", which allows Garudin to watch history through any person's eyes.

The soldier travelling with the Doctor succumbs to his injuries, but the Doctor manages to deliver the portrait to Kinzhal. He demands to know why the Lord General is stealing treasures from the past, and how the painting causes fires. Unseen by all but Angel, the Lord General's new aide tries to avoid the Doctor catching sight of her.

Trix awakes to find herself on the planet Paraiso with a woman named Aphrodite, and her soldier recovering in a villa. Using the diamond necklace, Aphrodite is able to use her pool to travel back to 1812 with Trix. Once there she greets Dusha as her mother. Unknown to the two of them, Fitz and Garudin are watching the reunion through Padorin's eyes: Garudin has to leave, but allows Fitz to stay, confident that he doesn't possess the metal discipline to control a person in the past. Trix, meanwhile, tricks Aphrodite into allowing her to go back to Paraiso apparently to fetch the Doctor to help them. Instead, she intends to steal the diamond necklace that allows Aphrodite to visit her mother.

Fitz is rescued by Bugayev. However, this is part of Garudin's plan, who intends to use him as a spy on the investigation. Fitz ruins this plan by convincing Bugayev to rescue Garudin's secretary as well: she is happy to betray her employer, and shows the Colonel evidence that Garudin has been using "Thought Time" to control the military leaders of the age. Bugayev can now justify a full scale raid on the industrialist's headquarters.

Kinzhal admits to the Doctor that the artifacts that have been collected all amplify powerful emotions because they have been in contact with Dusha. He sent his men to gather them, but cannot travel in time himself: he and Dusha are star-crossed lovers, aliens who are forbidden from seeing each other by their own people. The Doctor agrees to help create a mental bridge between the two lovers using the time travel technology, but the device he needs has been lost in the 21st century and possibly developed in a time machine.

The Doctor returns to the 21st century and is held by Bugayev, reunited with Fitz. However, once he realises that Angel, Garudin's secretary and Dusha's sister all look exactly the same, he decides to go back and visit Dusha to see what he is not being told. Fitz is still under Garudin's influence, and he intends to control the Doctor as well.

As Trix arrives on Paraiso, she finds her soldier and the locket missing, and assumes he must have taken it back to his time. She heads to 5000 to try to retrieve it, but she was mistaken: the soldier has returned to 1812 to force Aphrodite to take him home, being unable to work the controls of the time machine pool. The Doctor and Fitz arrive and convince Aphrodite and the soldier to return to Paraiso.

Once there, they work out where Trix has gone. Aphrodite explains that Dusha and Kinzhal are two halves of the same being, exiled for breaking their society's laws and having a child. United, the creature is more like an intelligent star, which means that if they are reunited, the Earth will be destroyed by their natural form.

Trix arrives too early, and ends up having to pose as Kinzhal's aide whilst she awaits what she assumes will be the return of the locket. In the meantime, the Doctor and Fitz arrive to offer a solution to the lover's separation to Kinzhal. However, he refuses, not wanting to take the risk that something will go wrong. However, at that point they are attacked and, although they defeat the attackers, Angel is mortally wounded. She offers her body to Dusha, knowing she can heal it, and the two lovers can be together without reforming as a star. Moved by her sacrifice, Kinzhal agrees.

The Doctor arranges for Dusha to arrive in the future in Angel's body, and also obtains the diamond he needed to find the true nature of Sabbath's masters. The empty locket is returned to Aphrodite on Paraiso, who vows to remain there, satisfied that her parents have been reunited. As Burgayev's raid on Garudin's headquarters is successful, the industrialist commits suicide, and the time travel equipment is confiscated and destroyed. The Doctor, Fitz and Trix are free to carry on their journey and attempt to defeat Sabbath's masters.

== Continuity ==
- This novel details the origins of the Time Agents of the 51st century, first mentioned in the Fourth Doctor serial The Talons of Weng-Chiang. However, as the group here is set up after Magnus Greel fled the 51st Century, it does not explain how he knows of their existence. The Time Agents also appear in the Eighth Doctor Adventures novels Eater of Wasps and Trading Futures. The Ninth and Tenth Doctors' companion Jack Harkness identified himself as a Time Agent.
- Colonel Bugayev works for the Russian equivalent of UNIT, Operativnaya Gruppa Rasvedkoy Obyedinyonnih Natsiy or OGRON, a play on the name of the Doctor Who monsters, the Ogrons. Forward has mentioned that the translation into Russian is accurate, although the grammatical order has been altered slightly to aid the joke. The rough translation is "United Nations Reconnaissance Operations Group".

== Notes ==
- Forward has mentioned on online forums that the inspiration for the novel was his love of Russian novels, such as those by Tolstoy.
- Although the back cover blurb identifies the dates of the different time periods in the novel, the dates are not mentioned in the text of the work.
