= Paul Morris (writer) =

Scottish playwright and screenwriter

Paul Morris (born 1958) is a Scottish playwright and screenwriter, born in Uddingston, South Lanarkshire. His early original plays in Scottish theatre include Three Wee Kings, Stef, Crabs and Wilsy and Transformer, a reworking of Franz Kafka's The Metamorphosis. More recently, he has co-written and directed a low-budget comedy feature titled Siamese Cop (Two Cops One Jacket), co-written the animated feature Duck Ugly produced by Millimages, and written an original screenplay, Partiendo Atomos, set in Buenos Aires and directed by John Dickinson. In 2011 his first novel, Pa Weathery's Chickens, was published by Night Publishing.
