= Doctor Who: The Monthly Adventures =

Audio dramas based on Doctor Who

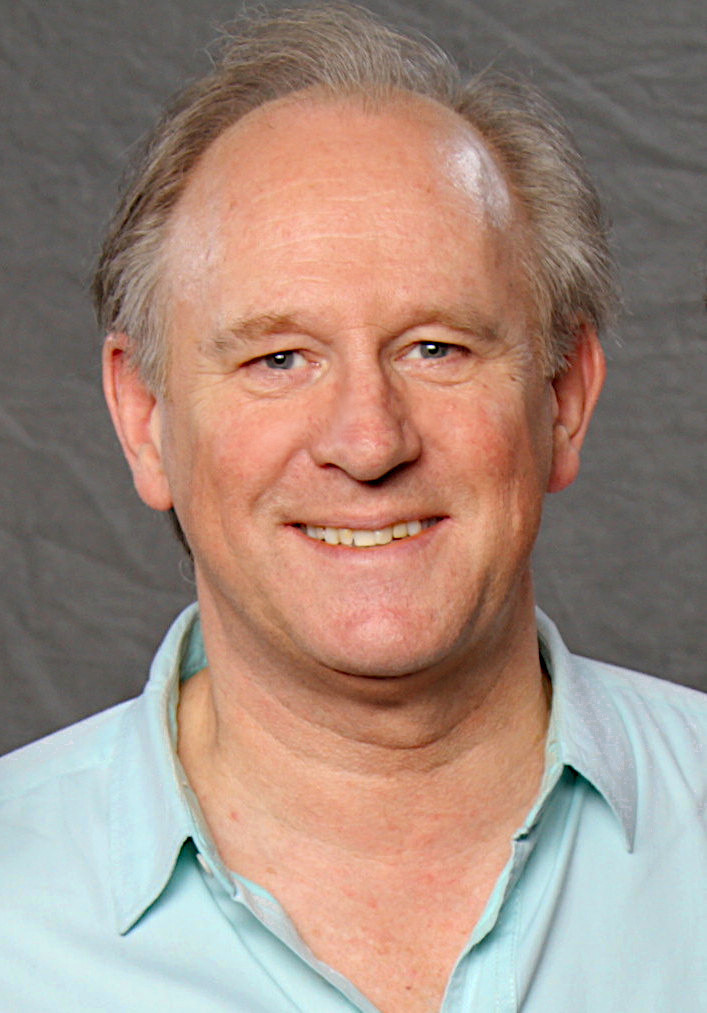
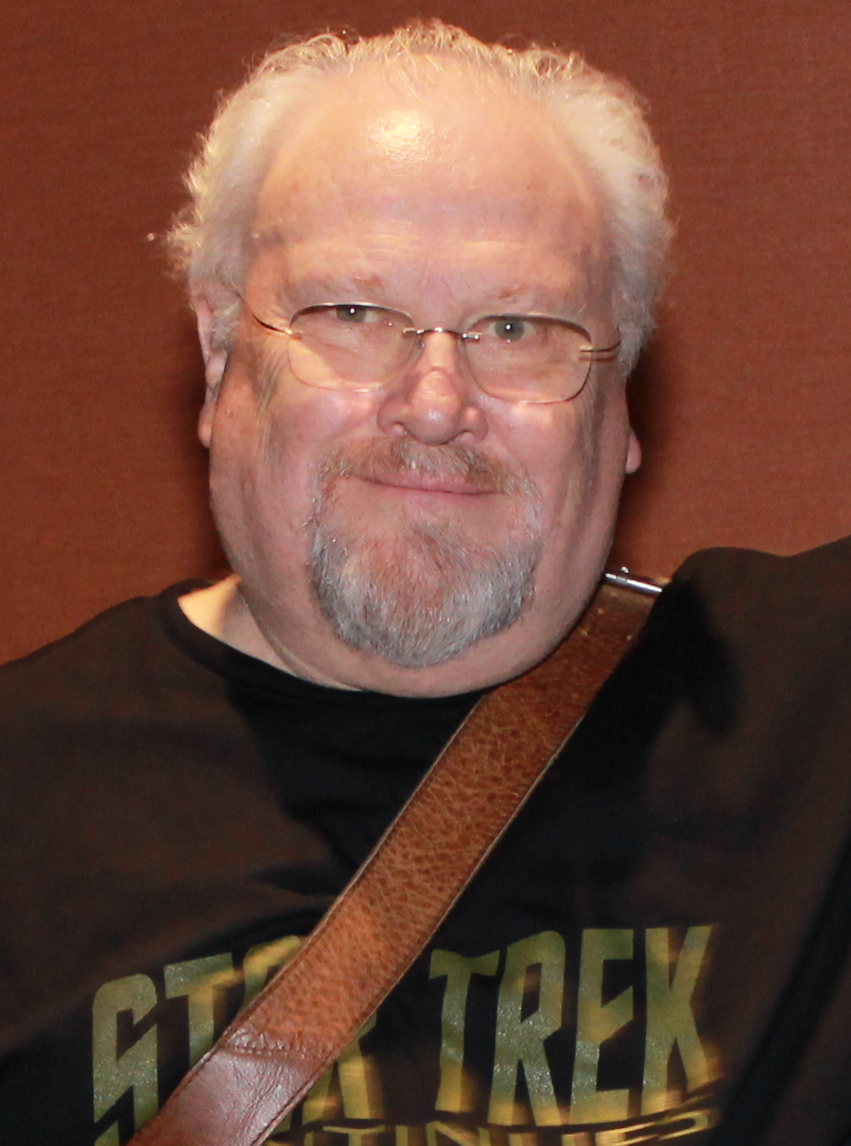
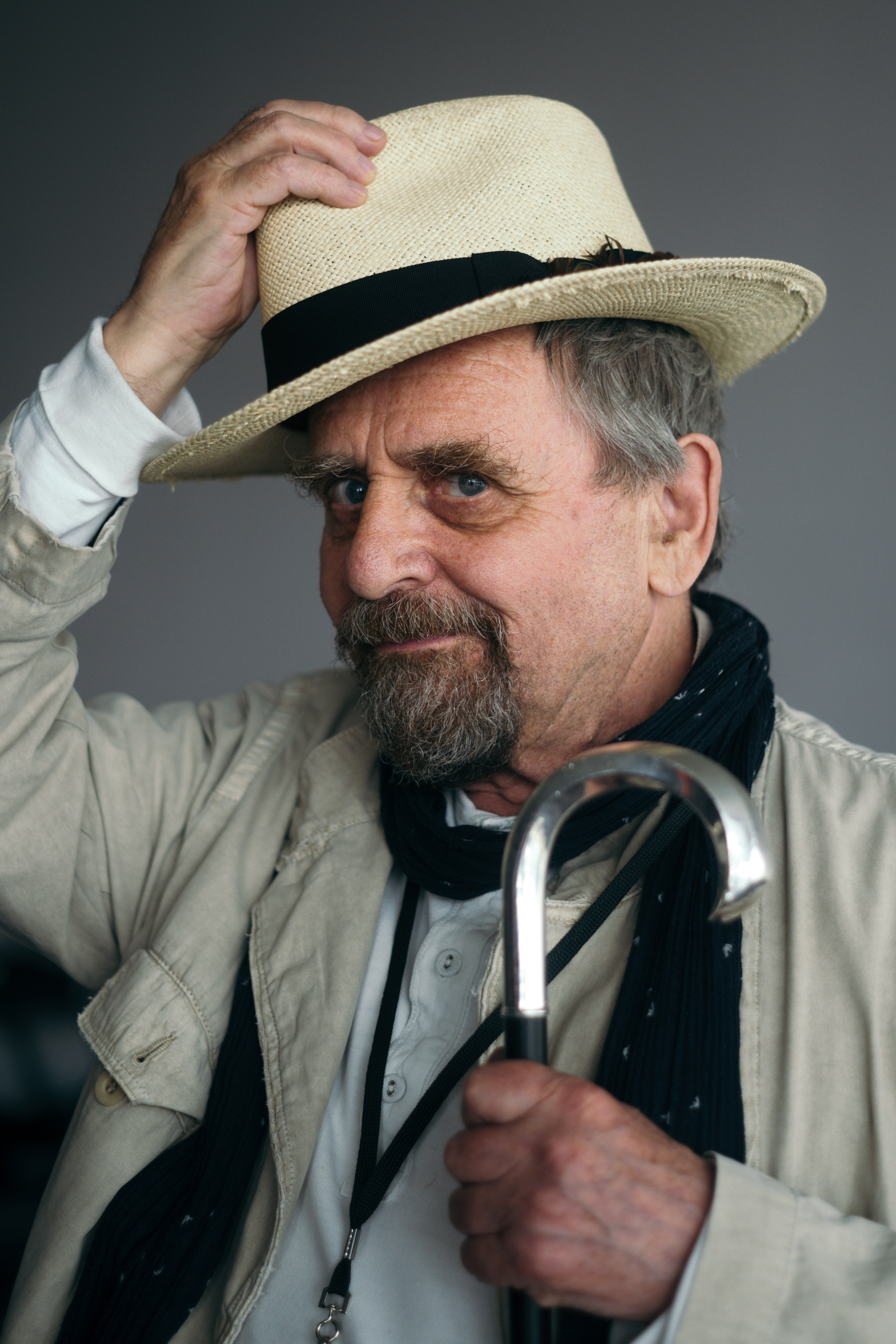
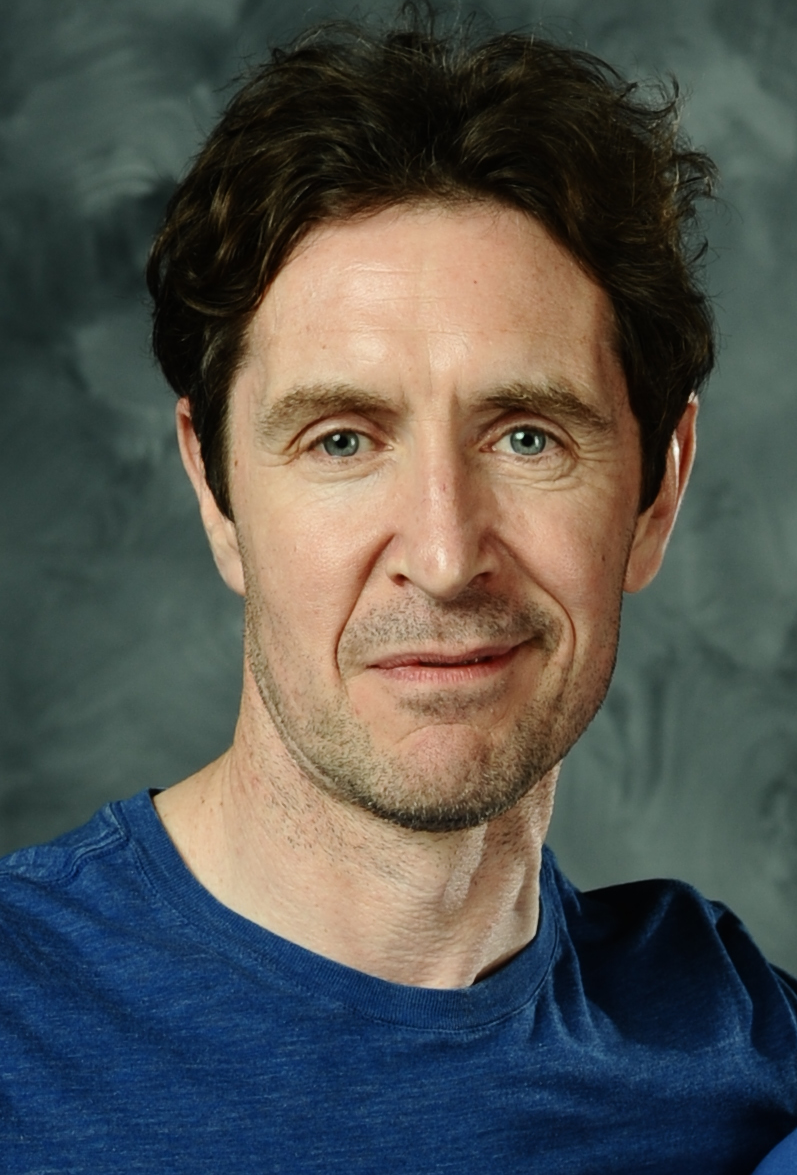
Four actors played the Doctor, from the fifth to the eighth, multiple times, in The Monthly Adventures. Top: Peter Davison, Colin Baker. Bottom: Sylvester McCoy, Paul McGann.

Doctor Who: The Monthly Adventures, formerly subtitled as the Main Range, is a full-cast audio drama series based on the British science fiction television programme Doctor Who. Produced by Big Finish Productions between 1999 and 2021, each audio drama stars one or more of the original actors who played the Doctor in the programme's classic series.

Doctor Who revolves around the adventures of an alien called the Doctor, whose people are called the Time Lords. He uses a spaceship called the TARDIS, which can travel in time as well as space. While travelling, the Doctor works to save lives and liberate oppressed peoples by combating foes. The Doctor often travels with companions. The programme has a concept of regeneration, in which, when a Time Lord is fatally injured, their cells regenerate and they are reincarnated into a different body with a different personality, but the same memories.

The Classic Series of Doctor Who, which these stories are based on, originally ran from 1963 to 1989 with a TV movie in 1996. In 1999, Big Finish obtained a non-exclusive licence to produce official Doctor Who audio plays.

Big Finish Productions began producing audio dramas featuring the Fifth Doctor, Sixth Doctor, and Seventh Doctors, under the "Main Range" banner, starting with the multi-Doctor story The Sirens of Time in July 1999. They gradually developed a pattern of thirteen releases per year, one every month with two in September or December. From 2001 to 2007, the main range also included releases featuring the Eighth Doctor; future releases with the Eighth Doctor were more sporadic, coincident with the beginning of the Eighth Doctor Adventures. Various companions appeared throughout the adventures in main and guest roles, mostly originating from television, though some originated from various spin-offs such as novels and comics, and some debuted in the Big Finish audios themselves.

In May 2020, Big Finish announced that The Monthly Adventures (which had recently changed its subtitle) would conclude with its 275th release, to be replaced with regular releases of each Doctor in their own boxsets throughout the year from January 2022, as part of a revamp. The number of these boxsets for each Doctor was announced in May 2022, with the first, second and fifth getting one boxset, and the other five, including the third and fourth, receiving two. With 275 releases over 22 years, the series holds the Guinness World Record for longest running science fiction audio play series.

== History ==
Though the programme had been put on indefinite hiatus in 1989 (and despite the failed revival attempt with the 1996 TV movie), the BBC still published, as well as gave non-exclusive licences to other companies to produce, Doctor Who stories through various mediums such as novels and comics. Big Finish Productions, which mostly consisted of fans who started out recording fan audio plays, were given the licence to record some of the New Adventures, a series of novels from Virgin Books which had originally been licensed Doctor Who stories, into audio plays. This eventually transitioned into a licence to produce original audio dramas featuring the past Doctors, with The Sirens of Time being the first story to be released in July 1999.

A number of Doctor Who spin-off writers formed the group of original writers, including Gary Russell, Nicholas Briggs, Justin Richards and Mark Gatiss. Future Doctor Who showrunner Steven Moffat also joined, but left after it became clear that the licence did not extend to the then-incumbent Eighth Doctor. The still alive actors of the Fourth to Eighth Doctors were approached for the role, but Tom Baker, the Fourth Doctor, declined. The releases therefore alternated between the Fifth, Sixth, and Seventh Doctors, with the licence extended to include the Eighth Doctor in 2001 (although his releases were generally not included in the alternating schedule, instead that year's Eighth Doctor releases would all come out one after the other before then returning to the normal rotation of the other Doctors). Doctor Who was revived in 2005, returning to television, and the next few years saw the introduction of new spin-offs, including The Eighth Doctor Adventures, and the Eighth Doctor mostly moved away from the Main Range.

Various companions from the television show returned across the next few years. March 2000 saw the first time a companion originated in Big Finish itself, with the introduction of Evelyn Smythe, played by Maggie Stables; October 2000 saw Lisa Bowerman reprise her role of Bernice Summerfield from Big Finish's spin-off of the same name, a character who originated in the Virgin novels; and November 2000 saw the introduction of Frobisher, who originated in the comics, with Robert Jezek playing the role. Since then, every televised companion has reprised their role in Big Finish (with the exception of Jackie Lane's Dodo Chaplet).

Big Finish has been characterised as “augmenting the canon" by utilising "fan experiences and memories of fans" from TV, steeping itself in "fan nostalgia", even using the serial format of the original series and the corresponding theme tunes; it has also been derogatorily referred to as being full of 'fanwank' for emphasising "fan pleasure" through references to continuity, over plot. The releases have also been compared to fanfiction, in the way they try to "correct perceived transgressions", focus on and deepen the characterisation and emotions of characters, and revitalise the earlier dynamics of some villains while also recontexualising their motivations. On a more neutral level, they have been characterised as focusing more on the 'interpersonal' than the 'epic'; that instead of homages, they serve as supplements to the story, improving and emphasising other parts of the plot.

Though the BBC has not echoed the sentiment, executive producer Nicholas Briggs considers the audios to be completely canonical.

== Theme music ==
From the start of the Main Range in July 1999 with The Sirens of Time up to the November 2002 release The Church and the Crown, the 1970s version of the theme tune by Delia Derbyshire was used anachronistically for all Fifth Doctor, Sixth Doctor, and Seventh Doctor stories in the Main Range, with the exception of the Seventh Doctor story The Rapture, released in September 2002, which used electronic dance remixes of the theme tune in keeping with the Ibiza nightclub theme of the story. At the time, the budget of Big Finish did not extend to being able to pay Dominic Glynn and Keff McCulloch for their versions of the television theme tune from 1986 and 1987–1989 respectively. Derbyshire was a BBC employee at the time when she made her versions of Ron Grainer's theme tune, so Big Finish would not have to pay her or her estate any royalties for using any of her versions of the theme tune. Derbyshire's 1970s theme tune was also considered more definitive than Peter Howell's version from 1980–1985. Howell had also been a BBC employee when he did his version of the theme tune.

Eighth Doctor Big Finish stories from the Main Range first used a new arrangement of the theme tune by David Arnold, starting from the first Eighth Doctor release, Storm Warning, in January 2001, up to The Girl Who Never Was in December 2007. The July 2009 release The Company of Friends used a new arrangement of the theme tune by Nicholas Briggs, while the trilogy of stories from October to December 2011, featuring the Eighth Doctor with Mary Shelley as his companion, used a new arrangement of the theme tune by Jamie Robertson.

From December 2002 onwards, beginning with Bang-Bang-a-Boom!, which had the correct McCulloch theme tune for a Seventh Doctor and Mel story, Big Finish was financially secure enough to start using the specific era versions of the theme tunes. There was a rare exception to this with the December 2006 release Year of the Pig, which is set in between the TV stories Timelash and Revelation of the Daleks, but uses the anachronistic Glynn version of the theme tune instead of the Howell version that was used during season 22 of the television series. The December 2020 release, Plight of the Pimpernel, takes place just before The Trial of a Time Lord, yet uses the Glynn theme, creating a debate amongst Big Finish Doctor Who fans as to whether the Glynn theme or Howell theme for Plight of the Pimpernel should have been used.

== Cast ==
The following table includes characters who have appeared in at least one year as a main character. Main cast refers to those who appeared multiple times across unrelated stories in a given year, while those marked guest-only appeared across one set of stories in a given year:

Key
✓	Main cast
•	Guest cast

=== 1999–2010 ===
Cast appearances 1999 – 2010
Actor	Character	Appearances											
Actor	Character	1999	2000	2001	2002	2003	2004	2005	2006	2007	2008	2009	2010
Peter Davison	Fifth Doctor	✓	✓	✓	✓	✓	✓	✓	✓	✓	✓	✓	✓
Colin Baker	Sixth Doctor	✓	✓	✓	✓	✓	✓	✓	✓	✓	✓	✓	✓
Sylvester McCoy	Seventh Doctor	✓	✓	✓	✓	✓	✓	✓	✓	✓	✓	✓	✓
Paul McGann	Eighth Doctor			✓	✓	✓	✓	✓	✓	✓		✓	
Mark Strickson	Vislor Turlough	✓		✓				✓					✓
Nicola Bryant	Peri Brown	✓	✓	✓	✓	✓	✓	✓	✓	✓	✓		
Sarah Sutton	Nyssa		✓	✓	✓	✓		✓		✓	✓	✓	✓
Sophie Aldred	Ace		✓	✓	✓	✓	✓	✓	✓	✓	✓	✓	✓
Maggie Stables	Evelyn Smythe		✓	✓	✓	✓	✓	✓	✓	✓	✓		✓
Bonnie Langford	Mel Bush		✓	✓	✓	✓		✓	✓	✓			
India Fisher	Charley Pollard			✓	✓	✓	✓	✓	✓	✓	✓	✓	
Caroline Morris	Erimem			✓	✓	✓	✓	✓	✓	✓	✓		
Tracey Childs	Elizabeth Klein			•									✓
Conrad Westmaas	C'rizz						✓	✓	✓	✓			
Philip Olivier	Hex						✓	✓	✓	✓	✓	✓	✓
Janet Fielding	Tegan Jovanka								✓				✓

=== 2011–2021 ===
Cast appearances 2011 – 2021
Actor	Character	Appearances										
Actor	Character	2011	2012	2013	2014	2015	2016	2017	2018	2019	2020	2021
Peter Davison	Fifth Doctor	✓	✓	✓	✓	✓	✓	✓	✓	✓	✓	✓
Colin Baker	Sixth Doctor	✓	✓	✓	✓	✓	✓	✓	✓	✓	✓	✓
Sylvester McCoy	Seventh Doctor	✓	✓	✓	✓	✓	✓	✓	✓	✓	✓	✓
Paul McGann	Eighth Doctor	✓										✓
Mark Strickson	Vislor Turlough	✓	✓	✓		✓	✓			✓		✓
Nicola Bryant	Peri Brown	✓		✓	✓					✓	✓	
Sarah Sutton	Nyssa	✓	✓	✓	✓	✓	✓	✓	✓	✓	✓	
Sophie Aldred	Ace		✓	✓	✓	✓	✓	✓	✓	✓	✓	
Maggie Stables	Evelyn Smythe	✓										
Bonnie Langford	Mel Bush			✓		✓	✓	✓	✓			
India Fisher	Charley Pollard											✓
Tracey Childs	Elizabeth Klein			✓					✓			
Philip Olivier	Hex		✓		✓			✓	✓		✓	
Janet Fielding	Tegan Jovanka	✓	✓	✓		✓	✓	✓	✓	✓	✓	
Lisa Greenwood	Flip Jackson	•	✓		✓		✓	✓			✓	
Miranda Raison	Constance Clarke					✓	✓	✓			✓	✓
Matthew Waterhouse	Adric							✓	✓			

=== Notable guests ===
The following list mentions the guest actors who have never appeared as a main character in any year, but have appeared as allies or enemies of the Doctor various times in the Main Range, or were allied multiple times in other mediums. They are listed alphabetically by character's last name (or only names when the last name is unknown or does not exist):

==== Companions in the show ====
- Katy Manning as Jo Grant (Note: Appeared in 198 as Grant and 51, 245 as Wildthyme)
- John Leeson as K9 (Note: Appeared in 50)
- Louise Jameson as Leela (Note: Appeared in 50, 230)
- Nicholas Courtney and Jon Culshaw as Brigadier Lethbridge-Stewart (Note: Appeared in 9, 19, 272)
- Frazer Hines as Jamie McCrimmon (Note: Appeared in 133 – 135, 199)
- Lalla Ward as Romana (Note: Appeared in 11, 33, 50, 119)
- Peter Purves as Steven Taylor (Note: Appeared in 200)
- Maureen O'Brien as Vicki (Note: Appeared in 200)
- Richard Franklin as Mike Yates (Note: Appeared in 198)

==== Others ====
- Maggie O'Neill as Lysandra Aristedes (Note: Appeared in 139, 162 – 164)
- Miles Richardson as Irving Braxiatel (Note: Appeared in 50, originating in the Virgin New Adventures)
- John Picard as Brewster (Note: Appeared in 107, 110, 113, 143 – 145)
- Nicola Walker as Liv Chenka (Note: Appeared in 149, serves as a companion to the Eighth Doctor in other Big Finish releases)
- Nicholas Briggs as the Daleks, Cybermen, and Ice Warriors (Note: Appeared in 11, 15, 32, 40, 65, 72, 93, 114, 121, 124, 129, 156, 177, 193, 201, 218, 224, 254, 269 – 270 as the Daleks; in 17, 34, 58, 86 – 87, 103, 112, 135, 153, 199, 240, 258 as the Cybermen; in 8, 98, 104, 117, 263 as the Ice Warriors (look at the individual releases for sources))
- Terry Molloy as Davros (Note: Appeared in 48, 65, 72, 156, 177)
- Mark Bonnar as The Eleven (Note: Appeared in 260, and has appeared in various other releases for Big Finish)
- Robert Jezek as Frobisher (Note: Appeared in 14, originating from a comic strip)
- Katy Manning as Iris Wildthyme
- George Watkins as Marc (Note: Appeared in 256 – 258, 267)
- Geoffrey Beevers, Alex Macqueen, and James Dreyfus as The Master (Note: Beevers appeared in 21, 49, 211, 213; Macqueen in 212, 213; Dreyfus in 261)
- Anna Hope as DI Menzies (Note: Appeared in 105, 116, 143)
- Graeme Garden and Rufus Hound as The Monk (Note: Appeared in 200, 262)
- Amy Pemberton as Sally Morgan (Note: Appeared in 152, 162 – 164, 181, 191)
- Siobhan Redmond as The Rani (Note: Appeared in 194, 205)
- Don Warrington as Rassilon (Note: Appeared in 33, 50, 64)
- Julie Cox as Mary Shelley (Note: Appeared in 123, 153 – 155)
- Lisa Bowerman as Bernice Summerfield (Note: Appeared in 13, 42, 123)

== Releases ==
=== 1999 ===
1999 releases
No.	Title	Directed by	Written by	Doctor	Featuring	Released	Ref
1	"The Sirens of Time"	Nicholas Briggs	Nicholas Briggs	Fifth, Sixth, Seventh	Time Lords	July 1999	
2	"Phantasmagoria"	Nicholas Briggs	Mark Gatiss	Fifth	Vislor Turlough	October 1999	
3	"Whispers of Terror"	Gary Russell	Justin Richards	Sixth	Peri Brown	November 1999	

=== 2000 ===
2000 releases
No.	Title	Directed by	Written by	Doctor	Featuring	Released	Ref
4	"The Land of the Dead"	Gary Russell	Stephen Cole	Fifth	Nyssa	January 2000	
5	"The Fearmonger"	Gary Russell	Jonathan Blum	Seventh	Ace McShane	February 2000	
6	"The Marian Conspiracy"	Gary Russell	Jacqueline Rayner	Sixth	Evelyn Smythe	March 2000	
7	"The Genocide Machine"	Nicholas Briggs	Mike Tucker	Seventh	Ace, Daleks	April 2000	
8	"Red Dawn"	Gary Russell	Justin Richards	Fifth	Peri, Ice Warriors	May 2000	
9	"The Spectre of Lanyon Moor"	Nicholas Pegg	Nicholas Pegg	Sixth	Evelyn, Brigadier	June 2000	
10	"Winter for the Adept"	Gary Russell	Andrew Cartmel	Fifth	Nyssa	July 2000	
11	"The Apocalypse Element"	Nicholas Briggs	Stephen Cole	Sixth	Evelyn, Romana II, Daleks	August 2000	
12	"The Fires of Vulcan"	Gary Russell	Steve Lyons	Seventh	Mel	September 2000	
13	"The Shadow of the Scourge"	Gary Russell	Paul Cornell	Seventh	Ace, Benny	October 2000	
14	"The Holy Terror"	Nicholas Pegg	Robert Shearman	Sixth	Frobisher	November 2000	
15	"The Mutant Phase"	Nicholas Briggs	Nicholas Briggs	Fifth	Nyssa, Daleks	December 2000	

=== 2001 ===
2001 releases
No.	Title	Directed by	Written by	Doctor	Featuring	Released	Ref
16	"Storm Warning"	Gary Russell	Alan Barnes	Eighth	Charley Pollard	January 2001	
17	"Sword of Orion"	Nicholas Briggs	Nicholas Briggs	Eighth	Charley, Cybermen	February 2001	
18	"The Stones of Venice"	Gary Russell	Paul Magrs	Eighth	Charley	March 2001	
19	"Minuet in Hell"	Nicholas Briggs	Alan W. Lear & Gary Russell	Eighth	Charley, Brigadier	April 2001	
20	"Loups-Garoux"	Nicholas Pegg	Marc Platt	Fifth	Turlough	May 2001	
21	"Dust Breeding"	Gary Russell	Mike Tucker	Seventh	Ace, The Master	June 2001	
22	"Bloodtide"	Gary Russell	Jonathan Morris	Sixth	Evelyn	July 2001	
23	"Project: Twilight"	Gary Russell	Cavan Scott & Mark Wright	Sixth	Evelyn	August 2001	
24	"The Eye of the Scorpion"	Gary Russell	Iain McLaughlin	Fifth	Peri, Erimem	September 2001	
25	"Colditz"	Gary Russell	Steve Lyons	Seventh	Ace, Elizabeth Klein	October 2001	
26	"Primeval"	Gary Russell	Lance Parkin	Fifth	Nyssa	November 2001	
27	"The One Doctor"	Gary Russell	Gareth Roberts & Clayton Hickman	Sixth	Mel	December 2001	

=== 2002 ===
2002 releases
No.	Title	Directed by	Written by	Doctor	Featuring	Released	Ref
28	"Invaders from Mars"	Mark Gatiss	Mark Gatiss	Eighth	Charley	January 2002	
29	"The Chimes of Midnight"	Barnaby Edwards	Robert Shearman	Eighth	Charley	February 2002	
30	"Seasons of Fear"	Gary Russell	Paul Cornell & Caroline Symcox	Eighth	Charley	March 2002	
31	"Embrace the Darkness"	Nicholas Briggs	Nicholas Briggs	Eighth	Charley	April 2002	
32	"The Time of the Daleks"	Nicholas Briggs	Justin Richards	Eighth	Charley, Daleks	May 2002	
33	"Neverland"	Gary Russell	Alan Barnes	Eighth	Charley, Romana II, Rassilon	June 2002	
34	"Spare Parts"	Gary Russell	Marc Platt	Fifth	Nyssa, Cybermen	July 2002	
35	"...ish"	Nicholas Briggs	Phil Pascoe	Sixth	Peri	August 2002	
36	"The Rapture"	Jason Haigh-Ellery	Joseph Lidster	Seventh	Ace	September 2002	
37	"The Sandman"	Gary Russell	Simon A. Forward	Sixth	Evelyn	October 2002	
38	"The Church and the Crown"	Gary Russell	Cavan Scott & Mark Wright	Fifth	Peri, Erimem	November 2002	
39	"Bang-Bang-a-Boom!"	Nicholas Pegg	Gareth Roberts & Clayton Hickman	Seventh	Mel	December 2002	

=== 2003 ===
2003 releases
No.	Title	Directed by	Written by	Doctor	Featuring	Released	Ref
40	"Jubilee"	Nicholas Briggs, Robert Shearman	Robert Shearman	Sixth	Evelyn, Daleks	January 2003	
41	"Nekromanteia"	John Ainsworth	Austen Atkinson	Fifth	Peri, Erimem	February 2003	
42	"The Dark Flame"	Jason Haigh-Ellery	Trevor Baxendale	Seventh	Ace, Benny	March 2003	
43	"Doctor Who and the Pirates"	Barnaby Edwards	Jacqueline Rayner	Sixth	Evelyn	April 2003	
44	"Creatures of Beauty"	Nicholas Briggs	Nicholas Briggs	Fifth	Nyssa	May 2003	
45	"Project: Lazarus"	Gary Russell	Cavan Scott & Mark Wright	Sixth	Seventh Doctor, Evelyn	June 2003	
46	"Flip-Flop"	Gary Russell	Jonathan Morris	Seventh	Mel	July 2003	
47	"Omega"	Gary Russell	Nev Fountain	Fifth	None	August 2003	
48	"Davros"	Gary Russell	Lance Parkin	Sixth	Davros	September 2003	
49	"Master"	Gary Russell	Joseph Lidster	Seventh	The Master	October 2003	
50	"Zagreus"	Gary Russell	Gary Russell & Alan Barnes	Third, (Note: Via archival footage) Fifth, Sixth, Seventh, Eighth	Charley, Romana II, Irving Braxiatel, Leela, K9, Rassilon	November 2003	
51	"The Wormery"	Gary Russell	Stephen Cole & Paul Magrs	Sixth	Iris Wildthyme	November 2003	
52	"Scherzo"	Gary Russell	Robert Shearman	Eighth	Charley	December 2003	

=== 2004 ===
2004 releases
No.	Title	Directed by	Written by	Doctor	Featuring	Released	Ref
53	"The Creed of the Kromon"	Gary Russell	Philip Martin	Eighth	Charley, C'rizz	January 2004	
54	"The Natural History of Fear"	Gary Russell	Jim Mortimore	Eighth	Charley, C'rizz	February 2004	
55	"The Twilight Kingdom"	Gary Russell	Will Shindler	Eighth	Charley, C'rizz	March 2004	
56	"The Axis of Insanity"	Gary Russell	Simon Furman	Fifth	Peri, Erimem	April 2004	
57	"Arrangements for War"	Gary Russell	Paul Sutton	Sixth	Evelyn	May 2004	
58	"The Harvest"	Gary Russell	Dan Abnett	Seventh	Ace, Hex, Cybermen	June 2004	
59	"The Roof of the World"	Gary Russell	Adrian Rigelsford	Fifth	Peri, Erimem	July 2004	
60	"Medicinal Purposes"	Gary Russell	Robert Ross	Sixth	Evelyn	August 2004	
61	"Faith Stealer"	Gary Russell	Graham Duff	Eighth	Charley, C'rizz	September 2004	
62	"The Last"	Gary Russell	Gary Hopkins	Eighth	Charley, C'rizz	October 2004	
63	"Caerdroia"	Gary Russell	Lloyd Rose	Eighth	Charley, C'rizz	November 2004	
64	"The Next Life"	Gary Russell	Alan Barnes & Gary Russell	Eighth	Charley, C'rizz, Rassilon	December 2004	

=== 2005 ===
2005 releases
No.	Title	Directed by	Written by	Doctor	Featuring	Released	Ref
65	"The Juggernauts"	Gary Russell	Scott Alan Woodard	Sixth	Mel, Davros, Daleks	January 2005	
66	"The Game"	Gary Russell	Darin Henry	Fifth	Nyssa	February 2005	
67	"Dreamtime"	Gary Russell	Simon A. Forward	Seventh	Ace, Hex	March 2005	
68	"Catch-1782"	Gary Russell	Alison Lawson	Sixth	Mel	April 2005	
69	"Three's a Crowd"	Gary Russell	Colin Brake	Fifth	Peri, Erimem	May 2005	
70	"Unregenerate!"	John Ainsworth	David A. McIntee	Seventh	Mel	June 2005	
71	"The Council of Nicaea"	Gary Russell	Caroline Symcox	Fifth	Peri, Erimem	July 2005	
72	"Terror Firma"	Gary Russell	Joseph Lidster	Eighth	Charley, C'rizz, Davros, Daleks	August 2005	
73	"Thicker Than Water"	Edward Salt	Paul Sutton	Sixth	Mel, Evelyn	September 2005	
74	"LIVE 34"	Gary Russell	James Parsons & Andrew Stirling-Brown	Seventh	Ace, Hex	September 2005	
75	"Scaredy Cat"	Nigel Fairs	Will Shindler	Eighth	Charley, C'rizz	October 2005	
76	"Singularity"	Gary Russell	James Swallow	Fifth	Turlough	November 2005	
77	"Other Lives"	Gary Russell	Gary Hopkins	Eighth	Charley, C'rizz	December 2005	

=== 2006 ===
2006 releases
No.	Title	Directed by	Written by	Doctor	Featuring	Released	Ref
78	"Pier Pressure"	Gary Russell	Robert Ross	Sixth	Evelyn	January 2006	
79	"Night Thoughts"	Gary Russell	Edward Young	Seventh	Ace, Hex	February 2006	
80	"Time Works"	Edward Salt	Steve Lyons	Eighth	Charley, C'rizz	March 2006	
81	"The Kingmaker"	Gary Russell	Nev Fountain	Fifth	Peri, Erimem	April 2006	
82	"The Settling"	Gary Russell	Simon Guerrier	Seventh	Ace, Hex	May 2006	
83	"Something Inside"	Nicholas Briggs	Trevor Baxendale	Eighth	Charley, C'rizz	June 2006	
84	"The Nowhere Place"	Nicholas Briggs	Nicholas Briggs	Sixth	Evelyn	July 2006	
85	"Red"	Gary Russell	Stewart Sheargold	Seventh	Mel	August 2006	
86	"The Reaping"	Gary Russell	Joseph Lidster	Sixth	Peri, Cybermen	September 2006	
87	"The Gathering"	Gary Russell	Joseph Lidster	Fifth	Tegan, Cybermen	September 2006	
88	"Memory Lane"	Gary Russell	Eddie Robson	Eighth	Charley, C'rizz	October 2006	
89	"No Man's Land"	John Ainsworth	Martin Day	Seventh	Ace, Hex	November 2006	
90	"Year of the Pig"	Gary Russell	Matthew Sweet	Sixth	Peri	December 2006	

=== 2007 ===
2007 releases
No.	Title	Directed by	Written by	Doctor	Featuring	Released	Ref
91	"Spring"	John Ainsworth	Paul Cornell & Mike Maddox	Fifth	Nyssa	January 2007	
91	"Summer"	John Ainsworth	Paul Cornell & Mike Maddox	Fifth	Nyssa	January 2007	
91	"Autumn"	John Ainsworth	Paul Cornell & Mike Maddox	Fifth	Nyssa	January 2007	
91	"Winter"	John Ainsworth	Paul Cornell & Mike Maddox	Fifth	Nyssa	January 2007	
Anthology release titled Circular Time.
92	"Nocturne"	John Ainsworth	Dan Abnett	Seventh	Ace, Hex	February 2007	
93	"Renaissance of the Daleks"	John Ainsworth	Christopher H. Bidmead	Fifth	Nyssa, Daleks	March 2007	
94	"I.D."	John Ainsworth	Eddie Robson	Sixth	None	April 2007	
94	"Urgent Calls"	John Ainsworth	Eddie Robson	Sixth	None	April 2007	
95	"Exotron"	Barnaby Edwards	Paul Sutton	Fifth	Peri	May 2007	
95	"Urban Myths"	Barnaby Edwards	Paul Sutton	Fifth	Peri	May 2007	
96	"Valhalla"	John Ainsworth	Marc Platt	Seventh	None	June 2007	
97	"The Wishing Beast"	John Ainsworth	Paul Magrs	Sixth	Mel	July 2007	
97	"The Vanity Box"	John Ainsworth	Paul Magrs	Sixth	Mel	July 2007	
98	"Frozen Time"	Barnaby Edwards	Nicholas Briggs	Seventh	Ice Warriors	August 2007	
99	"Son of the Dragon"	Barnaby Edwards	Steve Lyons	Fifth	Peri, Erimem	September 2007	
100	"100 BC"	Nicholas Briggs	Jacqueline Rayner	Sixth	Evelyn	September 2007	
100	"My Own Private Wolfgang"	Nicholas Briggs	Rob Shearman	Sixth	Evelyn	September 2007	
100	"Bedtime Story"	Nicholas Briggs	Joseph Lidster	Sixth	Evelyn	September 2007	
100	"The 100 Days of the Doctor"	Nicholas Briggs	Paul Cornell	Sixth	Evelyn	September 2007	
Anthology release titled 100.
101	"Absolution"	Barnaby Edwards	Scott Alan Woodard	Eighth	Charley, C'rizz	October 2007	
102	"The Mind's Eye"	Barnaby Edwards	Colin Brake	Fifth	Peri, Erimem	November 2007	
102	"Mission of the Viyrans"	Barnaby Edwards	Nicholas Briggs	Fifth	Peri, Erimem	November 2007	
103	"The Girl Who Never Was"	Barnaby Edwards	Alan Barnes	Eighth	Charley, Cybermen	December 2007	

=== 2008 ===
2008 releases
No.	Title	Directed by	Written by	Doctor	Featuring	Released	Ref
104	"The Bride of Peladon"	Barnaby Edwards	Barnaby Edwards	Fifth	Peri, Erimem, Ice Warriors	January 2008	
105	"The Condemned"	Nicholas Briggs	Eddie Robson	Sixth	Charley, DI Menzies	February 2008	
106	"The Dark Husband"	Nicholas Briggs	David Quantick	Seventh	Ace, Hex	March 2008	
107	"The Haunting of Thomas Brewster"	Barnaby Edwards	Jonathan Morris	Fifth	Nyssa, Brewster	April 2008	
108	"Assassin in the Limelight"	Barnaby Edwards	Robert Ross	Sixth	Evelyn	May 2008	
109	"The Death Collectors"	Ken Bentley	Stewart Sheargold	Seventh	None	June 2008	
109	"Spider's Shadow"	Ken Bentley	Stewart Sheargold	Seventh	None	June 2008	
110	"The Boy That Time Forgot"	Barnaby Edwards	Paul Magrs	Fifth	Nyssa, Brewster, Adric	July 2008	
111	"The Doomwood Curse"	Barnaby Edwards	Jacqueline Rayner	Sixth	Charley	August 2008	
112	"Kingdom of Silver"	Ken Bentley	James Swallow	Seventh	Cybermen	September 2008	
112	"Keepsake"	Nicholas Briggs	James Swallow	Seventh	Cybermen	September 2008	
113	"Time Reef"	Barnaby Edwards	Marc Platt	Fifth	Nyssa, Brewster	September 2008	
113	"A Perfect World"	Barnaby Edwards	Jonathan Morris	Fifth	Nyssa, Brewster	September 2008	
114	"Brotherhood of the Daleks"	Nicholas Briggs	Alan Barnes	Sixth	Charley, Daleks, Thals	October 2008	
115	"False Gods"	Ken Bentley	Mark Morris	Seventh	Ace, Hex	November 2008	
115	"Order of Simplicity"	Ken Bentley	Nick Scovell	Seventh	Ace, Hex	November 2008	
115	"Casualties of War"	Ken Bentley	Mark Michalowski	Seventh	Ace, Hex	November 2008	
115	"The Word Lord"	Ken Bentley	Steven Hall	Seventh	Ace, Hex	November 2008	
Anthology release titled Forty-five.
116	"The Raincloud Man"	Nicholas Briggs	Eddie Robson	Sixth	Charley, DI Menzies	December 2008	

=== 2009 ===
2009 releases
No.	Title	Directed by	Written by	Doctor	Featuring	Released	Ref
117	"The Judgement of Isskar"	Jason Haigh-Ellery	Simon Guerrier	Fifth	Amy, Ice Warriors	January 2009	
118	"The Destroyer of Delights"	Lisa Bowerman	Jonathan Clements	Fifth	Amy	February 2009	
119	"The Chaos Pool"	Lisa Bowerman	Peter Anghelides	Fifth	Amy, Romana II	March 2009	
120	"The Magic Mousetrap"	Ken Bentley	Matthew Sweet	Seventh	Ace, Hex	April 2009	
121	"Enemy of the Daleks"	Ken Bentley	David Bishop	Seventh	Ace, Hex, Daleks	May 2009	
122	"The Angel of Scutari"	Ken Bentley	Paul Sutton	Seventh	Ace, Hex	June 2009	
123	"Benny's Story"	Nicholas Briggs	Lance Parkin	Eighth	Benny	July 2009	
123	"Fitz's Story"	Nicholas Briggs	Stephen Cole	Eighth	Fitz	July 2009	
123	"Izzy's Story"	Nicholas Briggs	Alan Barnes	Eighth	Izzy	July 2009	
123	"Mary's Story"	Nicholas Briggs	Jonathan Morris	Eighth	Mary Shelley	July 2009	
Anthology release titled The Company of Friends.
124	"Patient Zero"	Nicholas Briggs	Nicholas Briggs	Sixth	Charley, Daleks	August 2009	
125	"Paper Cuts"	Nicholas Briggs	Marc Platt	Sixth	Charley	September 2009	
126	"Blue Forgotten Planet"	Nicholas Briggs	Nicholas Briggs	Sixth	Charley	September 2009	
127	"Castle of Fear"	Barnaby Edwards	Alan Barnes	Fifth	Nyssa	October 2009	
128	"The Eternal Summer"	Barnaby Edwards	Jonathan Morris	Fifth	Nyssa	November 2009	
129	"Plague of the Daleks"	Barnaby Edwards	Mark Morris	Fifth	Nyssa, Daleks	December 2009	

=== 2010 ===
2010 releases
No.	Title	Directed by	Written by	Doctor	Featuring	Released	Ref
130	"A Thousand Tiny Wings"	Lisa Bowerman	Andy Lane	Seventh	Klein	January 2010	
131	"Klein's Story"	John Ainsworth	John Ainsworth & Lee Mansfield	Seventh, Eighth	Klein	February 2010	
131	"Survival of the Fittest"	John Ainsworth	Jonathan Clements	Seventh, Eighth	Klein	February 2010	
132	"The Architects of History"	John Ainsworth	Steve Lyons	Seventh	Klein	March 2010	
133	"City of Spires"	Nicholas Briggs	Simon Bovey	Sixth	Jamie	April 2010	
134	"The Wreck of the Titan"	Barnaby Edwards	Barnaby Edwards	Sixth	Jamie	May 2010	
135	"Legend of the Cybermen"	Nicholas Briggs	Mike Maddox	Sixth	Jamie, Zoe, Cybermen	June 2010	
136	"Cobwebs"	Barnaby Edwards	Jonathan Morris	Fifth	Nyssa, Tegan, Turlough	July 2010	
137	"The Whispering Forest"	Barnaby Edwards	Stephen Cole	Fifth	Nyssa, Tegan, Turlough	August 2010	
138	"The Cradle of the Snake"	Barnaby Edwards	Marc Platt	Fifth	Nyssa, Tegan, Turlough	September 2010	
139	"Project Destiny"	Ken Bentley	Cavan Scott & Mark Wright	Seventh	Ace, Hex, Lysandra Aristedes	September 2010	
140	"A Death in the Family"	Ken Bentley	Steven Hall	Seventh	Ace, Hex, Evelyn	October 2010	
141	"Lurkers at Sunlight's Edge"	Ken Bentley	Marty Ross	Seventh	Ace, Hex	November 2010	
142	"The Demons of Red Lodge"	Ken Bentley	Jason Arnopp	Fifth	Nyssa	December 2010	
142	"The Entropy Composition"	Ken Bentley	Rick Briggs	Fifth	Nyssa	December 2010	
142	"Doing Time"	Ken Bentley	William Gallagher	Fifth	Nyssa	December 2010	
142	"Special Features"	Ken Bentley	John Dorney	Fifth	Nyssa	December 2010	
Anthology release titled The Demons of Red Lodge and Other Stories.

=== 2011 ===
2011 releases
No.	Title	Directed by	Written by	Doctor	Featuring	Released	Ref
143	"The Crimes of Thomas Brewster"	Nicholas Briggs	Jonathan Morris	Sixth	Evelyn, Brewster, Flip Jackson, DI Menzies	January 2011	
144	"The Feast of Axos"	Nicholas Briggs	Mike Maddox	Sixth	Evelyn, Brewster	February 2011	
145	"Industrial Evolution"	Nicholas Briggs	Eddie Robson	Sixth	Evelyn, Brewster	March 2011	
146	"Heroes of Sontar"	Ken Bentley	Alan Barnes	Fifth	Nyssa, Tegan, Turlough	April 2011	
147	"Kiss of Death"	Ken Bentley	Stephen Cole	Fifth	Nyssa, Tegan, Turlough	May 2011	
148	"Rat Trap"	Ken Bentley	Tony Lee	Fifth	Nyssa, Tegan, Turlough	June 2011	
149	"Robophobia"	Nicholas Briggs	Nicholas Briggs	Seventh	Liv Chenka	July 2011	
150	"Recorded Time"	Ken Bentley	Catherine Harvey	Sixth	Peri	August 2011	
150	"Paradoxicide"	Ken Bentley	Richard Dinnick	Sixth	Peri	August 2011	
150	"A Most Excellent Match"	Ken Bentley	Matt Fitton	Sixth	Peri	August 2011	
150	"Question Marks"	Ken Bentley	Philip Lawrence	Sixth	Peri	August 2011	
Anthology release titled Recorded Time and Other Stories.
151	"The Doomsday Quatrain"	Ken Bentley	Emma Beeby & Gordon Rennie	Seventh	None	September 2011	
152	"House of Blue Fire"	Ken Bentley	Mark Morris	Seventh	None	September 2011	
153	"The Silver Turk"	Barnaby Edwards	Marc Platt	Eighth	Mary Shelley, Cybermen	October 2011	
154	"The Witch from the Well"	Barnaby Edwards	Rick Briggs	Eighth	Mary Shelley	November 2011	
155	"Army of Death"	Barnaby Edwards	Jason Arnopp	Eighth	Mary Shelley	December 2011	

=== 2012 ===
2012 releases
No.	Title	Directed by	Written by	Doctor	Featuring	Released	Ref
156	"The Curse of Davros"	Nicholas Briggs	Jonathan Morris	Sixth	Flip, Davros, Daleks	January 2012	
157	"The Fourth Wall"	Nicholas Briggs	John Dorney	Sixth	Flip	February 2012	
158	"Wirrn Isle"	Nicholas Briggs	William Gallagher	Sixth	Flip	March 2012	
159	"The Emerald Tiger"	Barnaby Edwards	Barnaby Edwards	Fifth	Nyssa, Tegan, Turlough	April 2012	
160	"The Jupiter Conjunction"	Ken Bentley	Eddie Robson	Fifth	Nyssa, Tegan, Turlough	May 2012	
161	"The Butcher of Brisbane"	Ken Bentley	Marc Platt	Fifth	Nyssa, Tegan, Turlough	June 2012	
162	"Protect and Survive"	Ken Bentley	Jonathan Morris	Seventh	Ace, Hex	July 2012	
163	"Black and White"	Ken Bentley	Matt Fitton	Seventh	Ace, Hex, Aristedes, Sally	August 2012	
164	"Gods and Monsters"	Ken Bentley	Mike Maddox & Alan Barnes	Seventh	Ace, Hex, Aristedes, Sally	September 2012	
165	"The Burning Prince"	Ken Bentley	John Dorney	Fifth	None	September 2012	
166	"The Acheron Pulse"	Ken Bentley	Rick Briggs	Sixth	None	October 2012	
167	"The Shadow Heart"	Ken Bentley	Jonathan Morris	Seventh	None	November 2012	
168	"My Brother's Keeper"	Barnaby Edwards	Gordon Rennie	Fifth	Nyssa	December 2012	
168	"The Interplanetarian"	Barnaby Edwards	Jonathan Barnes	Fifth	Nyssa	December 2012	
168	"Smuggling Tales"	Barnaby Edwards	Catherine Harvey	Fifth	Nyssa	December 2012	
168	"1001 Nights"	Barnaby Edwards	Emma Beeby	Fifth	Nyssa	December 2012	
Anthology release titled 1001 Nights.

=== 2013 ===
2013 releases
No.	Title	Directed by	Written by	Doctor	Featuring	Released	Ref
169	"The Wrong Doctors"	Nicholas Briggs	Matt Fitton	Sixth	Mel	January 2013	
170	"Spaceport Fear"	Barnaby Edwards	William Gallagher	Sixth	Mel	February 2013	
171	"The Seeds of War"	Barnaby Edwards	Matt Fitton & Nicholas Briggs	Sixth	Mel	March 2013	
172	"Eldrad Must Die!"	Ken Bentley	Marc Platt	Fifth	Nyssa, Tegan, Turlough	April 2013	
173	"The Lady of Mercia"	Ken Bentley	Paul Magrs	Fifth	Nyssa, Tegan, Turlough	May 2013	
174	"Prisoners of Fate"	Ken Bentley	Jonathan Morris	Fifth	Nyssa, Tegan, Turlough	June 2013	
175	"Persuasion"	Ken Bentley	Jonathan Barnes	Seventh	Klein	July 2013	
176	"Starlight Robbery"	Ken Bentley	Matt Fitton	Seventh	Klein	August 2013	
177	"Daleks Among Us"	Ken Bentley	Alan Barnes	Seventh	Klein, Davros, Daleks	September 2013	
178	"1963 - Fanfare for the Common Men"	Barnaby Edwards	Eddie Robson	Fifth	Nyssa	September 2013	
179	"1963 - The Space Race"	Nicholas Briggs	Jonathan Morris	Sixth	Peri	October 2013	
180	"1963 - The Assassination Games"	Ken Bentley	John Dorney	Seventh	Ace	November 2013	
181	"Afterlife"	Ken Bentley	Matt Fitton	Seventh	Ace, Hex/Hector, Sally	December 2013	

=== 2014 ===
2014 releases
No.	Title	Directed by	Written by	Doctor	Featuring	Released	Ref
182	"Antidote to Oblivion"	Nicholas Briggs	Philip Martin	Sixth	Flip	January 2014	
183	"The Brood of Erys"	Nicholas Briggs	Andrew Smith	Sixth	Flip	February 2014	
184	"Scavenger"	Nicholas Briggs	William Gallagher	Sixth	Flip	March 2014	
185	"Moonflesh"	Ken Bentley	Mark Morris	Fifth	Nyssa	April 2014	
186	"Tomb Ship"	Ken Bentley	Gordon Rennie & Emma Beeby	Fifth	Nyssa	May 2014	
187	"Masquerade"	Ken Bentley	Stephen Cole	Fifth	Nyssa	June 2014	
188	"Breaking Bubbles"	Nicholas Briggs	L M Myles	Sixth	Peri	July 2014	
188	"Of Chaos Time The"	Nicholas Briggs	Mark Ravenhill	Sixth	Peri	July 2014	
188	"An Eye for Murder"	Nicholas Briggs	Una McCormack	Sixth	Peri	July 2014	
188	"The Curious Incident of the Doctor in the Night-Time"	Nicholas Briggs	Nev Fountain	Sixth	Peri	July 2014	
Anthology release titled Breaking Bubbles and Other Stories.
189	"Revenge of the Swarm"	Ken Bentley	Jonathan Morris	Seventh	Ace, Hector	August 2014	
190	"Mask of Tragedy"	Ken Bentley	James Goss	Seventh	Ace, Hector	September 2014	
191	"Signs and Wonders"	Ken Bentley	Matt Fitton	Seventh	Ace, Hector, Sally	September 2014	
192	"The Widow's Assassin"	Ken Bentley	Nev Fountain	Sixth	Peri, Flip	October 2014	
193	"Masters of Earth"	Nicholas Briggs	Cavan Scott & Mark Wright	Sixth	Peri, Daleks	November 2014	
194	"The Rani Elite"	Ken Bentley	Justin Richards	Sixth	Peri, the Rani	December 2014	

=== 2015 ===
2015 releases
No.	Title	Directed by	Written by	Doctor	Featuring	Released	Ref
195	"Mistfall"	Ken Bentley	Andrew Smith	Fifth	Nyssa, Tegan, Turlough	January 2015	
196	"Equilibrium"	Ken Bentley	Matt Fitton	Fifth	Nyssa, Tegan, Turlough	February 2015	
197	"The Entropy Plague"	Ken Bentley	Jonathan Morris	Fifth	Nyssa, Tegan, Turlough	March 2015	
198	"The Defectors"	Nicholas Briggs	Nicholas Briggs	Seventh	Jo Grant, Mike Yates	April 2015	
199	"Last of the Cybermen"	Ken Bentley	Alan Barnes	Sixth	Jamie McCrimmon, Zoe Heriot, Cybermen	May 2015	
200	"The Secret History"	Barnaby Edwards	Eddie Robson	Fifth	Vicki, Steven Taylor, the Monk	June 2015	
201	"We Are the Daleks"	Ken Bentley	Jonathan Morris	Seventh	Mel, Daleks	July 2015	
202	"The Warehouse"	Barnaby Edwards	Mike Tucker	Seventh	Mel	August 2015	
203	"Terror of the Sontarans"	Ken Bentley	John Dorney & Dan Starkey	Seventh	Mel, Sontarans	September 2015	
204	"Criss-Cross"	Ken Bentley	Matt Fitton	Sixth	Constance	September 2015	
205	"Planet of the Rani"	Ken Bentley	Marc Platt	Sixth	Constance, the Rani	October 2015	
206	"Shield of the Jötunn"	Louise Jameson	Ian Edginton	Sixth	Constance	November 2015	
207	"You Are the Doctor"	Ken Bentley	John Dorney	Seventh	Ace	December 2015	
207	"Come Die With Me"	Ken Bentley	Jamie Anderson	Seventh	Ace	December 2015	
207	"The Grand Betelgeuse Hotel"	Ken Bentley	Christopher Cooper	Seventh	Ace	December 2015	
207	"Dead to the World"	Ken Bentley	Matthew Elliott	Seventh	Ace	December 2015	
Anthology release titled You Are the Doctor and Other Stories.

=== 2016 ===
2016 releases
No.	Title	Directed by	Written by	Doctor	Featuring	Released	Ref
208	"The Waters of Amsterdam"	Jamie Anderson	Jonathan Morris	Fifth	Nyssa, Tegan	January 2016	
209	"Aquitaine"	Ken Bentley	Simon Barnard & Paul Morris	Fifth	Nyssa, Tegan	February 2016	
210	"The Peterloo Massacre"	Jamie Anderson	Paul Magrs	Fifth	Nyssa, Tegan	March 2016	
211	"And You Will Obey Me"	Jamie Anderson	Alan Barnes	Fifth	The Master	April 2016	
212	"Vampire of the Mind"	Jamie Anderson	Justin Richards	Sixth	The Master	May 2016	
213	"The Two Masters"	Jamie Anderson	John Dorney	Seventh	The Master	June 2016	
214	"A Life of Crime"	Ken Bentley	Matt Fitton	Seventh	Mel, Ace	July 2016	
215	"Fiesta of the Damned"	Ken Bentley	Guy Adams	Seventh	Mel, Ace	August 2016	
216	"Maker of Demons"	Ken Bentley	Matthew J Elliott	Seventh	Mel, Ace	September 2016	
217	"The Memory Bank"	Helen Goldwyn	Chris Chapman	Fifth	Turlough	October 2016	
217	"The Last Fairy Tale"	Helen Goldwyn	Paul Magrs	Fifth	Turlough	October 2016	
217	"Repeat Offender"	Helen Goldwyn	Eddie Robson	Fifth	Turlough	October 2016	
217	"The Becoming"	Helen Goldwyn	Ian Potter	Fifth	Turlough	October 2016	
Anthology release titled The Memory Bank and Other Stories.
218	"Order of the Daleks"	Jamie Anderson	Mike Tucker	Sixth	Constance, Daleks	November 2016	
219	"Absolute Power"	Jamie Anderson	Jamie Anderson	Sixth	Constance	December 2016	
220	"Quicksilver"	Jamie Anderson	Matt Fitton	Sixth	Constance, Flip	December 2016	

=== 2017 ===
2017 releases
No.	Title	Directed by	Written by	Doctor	Featuring	Released	Ref
221	"The Star Men"	Barnaby Edwards	Andrew Smith	Fifth	Adric, Nyssa, Tegan	January 2017	
222	"The Contingency Club"	Barnaby Edwards	Phil Mulryne	Fifth	Adric, Nyssa, Tegan	February 2017	
223	"Zaltys"	Barnaby Edwards	Matthew J Elliott	Fifth	Adric, Nyssa, Tegan	March 2017	
224	"Alien Heart"	Ken Bentley	Stephen Cole	Fifth	Nyssa, Daleks	April 2017	
224	"Dalek Soul"	Ken Bentley	Guy Adams	Fifth	Nyssa, Daleks	April 2017	
225	"Vortex Ice"	Ken Bentley	Jonathan Morris	Sixth	Flip	May 2017	
225	"Cortex Fire"	Ken Bentley	Ian Potter	Sixth	Flip	May 2017	
226	"Shadow Planet"	Ken Bentley	AK Benedict	Seventh	Ace, Hex	June 2017	
226	"World Apart"	Ken Bentley	Scott Handcock	Seventh	Ace, Hex	June 2017	
227	"The High Price of Parking"	Ken Bentley	John Dorney	Seventh	Ace, Mel	July 2017	
228	"The Blood Furnace"	Ken Bentley	Eddie Robson	Seventh	Ace, Mel	August 2017	
229	"The Silurian Candidate"	Ken Bentley	Matthew J Elliot	Seventh	Ace, Mel	September 2017	
230	"Time in Office"	Helen Goldwyn	Eddie Robson	Fifth	Tegan, Leela	September 2017	
231	"The Behemoth"	Jamie Anderson	Marc Platt	Sixth	Constance, Flip	October 2017	
232	"The Middle"	Jamie Anderson	Chris Chapman	Sixth	Constance, Flip	November 2017	
233	"Static"	Jamie Anderson	Jonathan Morris	Sixth	Constance, Flip	December 2017	

=== 2018 ===
2018 releases
No.	Title	Directed by	Written by	Doctor	Featuring	Released	Ref
234	"Kingdom of Lies"	Barnaby Edwards	Robert Khan & Tom Salinsky	Fifth	Adric, Nyssa, Tegan	January 2018	
235	"Ghost Walk"	Barnaby Edwards	James Goss	Fifth	Adric, Nyssa, Tegan	February 2018	
236	"Serpent in the Silver Mask"	Barnaby Edwards	David Llewellyn	Fifth	Adric, Nyssa, Tegan	March 2018	
237	"The Helliax Rift"	Jamie Anderson	Scott Handcock	Fifth	Daniel Hopkins	April 2018	
238	"The Lure of the Nomad"	John Ainsworth	Matthew J Elliott	Sixth	Mathew Sharpe	May 2018	
239	"Iron Bright"	John Ainsworth	Chris Chapman	Sixth	None	June 2018	
240	"Hour of the Cybermen"	Jamie Anderson	Andrew Smith	Sixth	Daniel Hopkins, Cybermen	July 2018	
241	"Red Planets"	Jamie Anderson	Una McCormack	Seventh	Ace, Mel	August 2018	
242	"The Dispossessed"	Jamie Anderson	Mark Morris	Seventh	Ace, Mel	September 2018	
243	"The Quantum Possibility Engine"	Jamie Anderson	Guy Adams	Seventh	Ace, Mel, Narvin	October 2018	
244	"Warlock's Cross"	Jamie Anderson	Steve Lyons	Seventh	Klein, Daniel Hopkins	November 2018	
245	"Muse of Fire"	Jamie Anderson	Paul Magrs	Seventh	Ace, Hex, Iris Wildthyme	December 2018	
246	"The Hunting Ground"	John Ainsworth	A K Benedict	Sixth	None	December 2018	

=== 2019 ===
2019 releases
No.	Title	Directed by	Written by	Doctor	Featuring	Released	Ref
247	"Devil in the Mist"	Ken Bentley	Cavan Scott	Fifth	Tegan, Turlough, Kamelion	January 2019	
248	"Black Thursday"	Ken Bentley	Jamie Anderson	Fifth	Tegan, Turlough, Kamelion	February 2019	
248	"Power Game"	Ken Bentley	Eddie Robson	Fifth	Tegan, Turlough, Kamelion	February 2019	
249	"The Kamelion Empire"	Ken Bentley	Jonathan Morris	Fifth	Tegan, Turlough, Kamelion	March 2019	
250	"The Monsters of Gokroth"	Samuel Clemens	Matt Fitton	Seventh	Mags	April 2019	
251	"The Moons of Vulpana"	Samuel Clemens	Emma Reeves	Seventh	Mags	May 2019	
252	"An Alien Werewolf in London"	Samuel Clemens	Alan Barnes	Seventh	Mags, Ace	June 2019	
253	"Memories of a Tyrant"	John Ainsworth	Roland Moore	Sixth	Peri	July 2019	
254	"Emissary of the Daleks"	John Ainsworth	Andrew Smith	Sixth	Peri, Daleks	August 2019	
255	"Harry Houdini's War"	Ken Bentley	Steve Lyons	Sixth	Peri	September 2019	
256	"Tartarus"	Scott Handcock	David Llewellyn	Fifth	Nyssa, Tegan, Marc	September 2019	
257	"Interstitial"	Scott Handcock	Carl Rowens	Fifth	Nyssa, Tegan, Marc	October 2019	
257	"Feast of Fear"	Scott Handcock	Martyn Waites	Fifth	Nyssa, Tegan, Marc	October 2019	
258	"Warzone"	Scott Handcock	Guy Adams	Fifth	Nyssa, Tegan, Marc	November 2019	
258	"Conversion"	Scott Handcock	Chris Chapman	Fifth	Nyssa, Tegan, Marc, Cybermen	November 2019	
259	"Blood on Santa's Claw"	John Ainsworth	Alan Terigo	Sixth	Peri	December 2019	
259	"The Baby Awakes"	John Ainsworth	Susan Dennom	Sixth	Peri	December 2019	
259	"I Wish It Could Be Christmas Every Day"	John Ainsworth	Andrew Lias	Sixth	Peri	December 2019	
259	"Brightly Shone the Moon That Night"	John Ainsworth	Nev Fountain	Sixth	Peri	December 2019	
Anthology release titled Blood on Santa's Claw and Other Stories.

=== 2020 ===
2020 releases
No.	Title	Directed by	Written by	Doctor	Featuring	Released	Ref
260	"Dark Universe"	Ken Bentley	Guy Adams	Seventh	Ace, The Eleven	January 2020	
261	"The Psychic Circus"	Samuel Clemens	Stephen Wyatt	Seventh	The Master	February 2020	
262	"Subterfuge"	Samuel Clemens	Helen Goldwyn	Seventh	The Monk	March 2020	
263	"Cry of the Vultriss"	John Ainsworth	Darren Jones	Sixth	Constance, Flip, Ice Warriors	April 2020	
264	"Scorched Earth"	John Ainsworth	Chris Chapman	Sixth	Constance, Flip	May 2020	
265	"The Lovecraft Invasion"	Scott Handcock	Robert Valentine	Sixth	Constance, Flip	July 2020 (Note: This title suffered from a delay in production due to the COVID-19 lockdown, and was not released during the original release window of June 2020. It was ultimately released on 30 July 2020.)	
266	"Ghost Station"	Ken Bentley	Steve Lyons	Fifth	None	July 2020	
266	"The Bridge Master"	Ken Bentley	Jacqueline Rayner	Fifth	None	July 2020	
266	"What Lurks Down Under"	Ken Bentley	Tommy Donbavand	Fifth	None	July 2020	
266	"The Dancing Plague"	Ken Bentley	Kate Thorman	Fifth	None	July 2020	
Anthology release titled Time Apart.
267	"Thin Time"	Scott Handcock	Dan Abnett	Fifth	None	August 2020	
267	"Madquake"	Scott Handcock	Guy Adams	Fifth	Nyssa, Tegan, Marc	August 2020	
268	"The Flying Dutchman"	Samuel Clemens	Gemma Arrowsmith	Seventh	Ace, Hex	September 2020	
268	"Displaced"	Samuel Clemens	Katharine Armitage	Seventh	Ace, Hex	September 2020	
269	"Aimed at the Body"	Ken Bentley	James Kettle	Fifth	Daleks	October 2020	
269	"Lightspeed"	Ken Bentley	Jonathan Morris	Fifth	Daleks	October 2020	
269	"The Bookshop at the End of the World"	Ken Bentley	Simon Guerrier	Fifth	Daleks	October 2020	
269	"Interlude"	Ken Bentley	Dan Starkey	Fifth	Daleks	October 2020	
Anthology release titled Shadow of the Daleks 1.
270	"The Echo Chamber"	Ken Bentley	Jonathan Barnes	Fifth	Daleks	November 2020	
270	"Towards Zero"	Ken Bentley	Roland Moore	Fifth	Daleks	November 2020	
270	"Castle Hydra"	Ken Bentley	Lizzie Hopley	Fifth	Daleks	November 2020	
270	"Effect and Cause"	Ken Bentley	John Dorney	Fifth	Daleks	November 2020	
Anthology release titled Shadow of the Daleks 2.
271	"Plight of the Pimpernel"	John Ainsworth	Chris Chapman	Sixth	Peri	December 2020	
272	"The Grey Man of the Mountain"	Samuel Clemens	Lizbeth Myles	Seventh	Ace, Brigadier	December 2020	

=== 2021 ===
2021 releases
No.	Title	Directed by	Written by	Doctor	Featuring	Released	Ref
273	"Colony of Fear"	John Ainsworth	Roland Moore	Sixth	Constance	January 2021	
274	"The Blazing Hour"	Ken Bentley	James Kettle	Fifth	Turlough	February 2021	
275	"Death and the Desert"	Ken Bentley	Robert Valentine	Fifth	Turlough	March 2021	
275	"Flight of the Blackstar"	Ken Bentley	Robert Valentine	Sixth	Constance	March 2021	
275	"Night Gallery"	Ken Bentley	Robert Valentine	Eighth	Charley	March 2021	
275	"The Lost Moon"	Ken Bentley	Robert Valentine	Fifth, Sixth, Seventh, Eighth	None	March 2021	
Anthology release titled The End of the Beginning.

== Continuation ==
In May 2020, Big Finish announced that the Main Range would conclude with its 275th release, to be replaced with regular releases of each Doctor in their own boxsets throughout the year from January 2022. With 275 releases over 22 years, the series achieved the Guinness World Record for longest running science fiction audio play series in 2021. However, in terms of time-span the claim is contestable, as Ruby the Galactic Gumshoe by the ZBS Foundation has run sporadically since 1982, with a release as recently as 2025, and at the time of The Monthly Adventures receiving the award, had made a release in 2018, a 36-year lifespan then, and a 43-year lifespan as of the most recent release.

The revamp was stated by Big Finish to be an effort to be more accessible to newcomers by allowing for "a natural 'stepping on point'" for them; they also stated that it would allow for more "exciting new possibilities and creative freedom" in the cast combinations and story lengths and arcs.
