= List of Doctor Who: The New Series audio plays by Big Finish =

This is a list of audio productions based on the revived era of the long-running British science fiction television series Doctor Who produced by Big Finish Productions.

== Cast ==
The dramas feature both former actors who portrayed the Doctor and their companions, and new continuing characters as well as elements from other spin-off media. The canonicity of the audio dramas, as with other Doctor Who spin-off media, is unclear. Big Finish's current licence from the BBC allows it to produce audio dramas featuring the first twelve incarnations of the Doctor and associated characters introduced into the series between 1963 and 2022.

Productions have featured the War (played by John Hurt, with Jonathon Carley taking on the role following Hurt's death), Ninth (Christopher Eccleston), Tenth (David Tennant), Thirteenth (Jodie Whittaker), and Fugitive (Jo Martin) Doctors portrayed by their original actors. Returning companions of the Doctor from the revived series include Rose Tyler (Billie Piper), Donna Noble (Catherine Tate), and Yasmin Khan (Mandip Gill), also portrayed by their original actors. Adventures featuring the Eleventh and Twelfth Doctors have them played by other voice actors. Big Finish have also released The Doctor Chronicles, a series of audio plays and dramas where the Doctor was performed by voice actors as well.

== Ranges ==
=== The Ninth Doctor Adventures (2021–present) ===
==== Series 1 (2021–2022) ====
| No. | Title | Directed by | Written by | Featuring | Released |
|---|---|---|---|---|---|
Volume 1: Ravagers
| 1 | "Sphere of Freedom" | Nicholas Briggs | Nicholas Briggs | Ninth Doctor, Nova, Audrey | May 2021 |
| 2 | "Cataclysm" | Nicholas Briggs | Nicholas Briggs | Ninth Doctor, Nova, Audrey | May 2021 |
| 3 | "Food Fight" | Nicholas Briggs | Nicholas Briggs | Ninth Doctor, Nova, Audrey | May 2021 |
Volume 2: Respond to All Calls
| 4 | "Girl, Deconstructed" | Helen Goldwyn | Lisa McMullin | Ninth Doctor, Marnie, Kurt, Serapheem | August 2021 |
| 5 | "Fright Motif" | Helen Goldwyn | Tim Foley | Ninth Doctor, Artie Berger, Zazie Vincent, Maurice Le Bon | August 2021 |
| 6 | "Planet of the End" | Helen Goldwyn | Timothy X Atack | Ninth Doctor, First Incorporation | August 2021 |
Volume 3: Lost Warriors
| 7 | "The Hunting Season" | Barnaby Edwards | James Kettle | Ninth Doctor | November 2021 |
| 8 | "The Curse of Lady Macbeth" | Barnaby Edwards | Lizzie Hopley | Ninth Doctor | November 2021 |
| 9 | "Monsters in Metropolis" | Barnaby Edwards | John Dorney | Ninth Doctor, Fritz Lang, Cybermen | November 2021 |
Volume 4: Old Friends
| 10 | "Fond Farewell" | Helen Goldwyn | David K Barnes | Ninth Doctor | February 2022 |
| 11 | "Way of the Burryman" | Helen Goldwyn | Roy Gill | Ninth Doctor, Brigadier Lethbridge-Stewart, Sam Bishop, Fiona McCall, Cybermen | February 2022 |
| 12 | "The Forth Generation" | Helen Goldwyn | Roy Gill | Ninth Doctor, The Brigadier, Sam, Fiona, Cybermen | February 2022 |

==== Series 2 (2022–2023) ====
| No. | Title | Directed by | Written by | Featuring | Released |
|---|---|---|---|---|---|
Volume 1: Back to Earth
| 1 | "Station to Station" | Helen Goldwyn | Robert Valentine | Ninth Doctor, Saffron Windrose | May 2022 |
| 2 | "The False Dimitry" | Helen Goldwyn | Sarah Grochala | Ninth Doctor | May 2022 |
| 3 | "Auld Lang Syne" | Helen Goldwyn | Tim Foley | Ninth Doctor, Mandy Litherland | May 2022 |
Volume 2: Into the Stars
| 4 | "Salvation Nine" | Helen Goldwyn | Timothy X Atack | Ninth Doctor, Sontarans | August 2022 |
| 5 | "Last of the Zetacene" | Helen Goldwyn | James Kettle | Ninth Doctor | August 2022 |
| 6 | "Break the Ice" | Helen Goldwyn | Tim Foley | Ninth Doctor, Jack Frost | August 2022 |
Volume 3: Hidden Depths
| 7 | "The Seas of Titan" | Ken Bentley | Lizbeth Myles | Ninth Doctor, Sea Devils | November 2022 |
| 8 | "Lay Down Your Arms" | Ken Bentley | Lisa McMullin | Ninth Doctor, Bertha Kinzky | November 2022 |
| 9 | "Flatpack" | Ken Bentley | John Dorney | Ninth Doctor, Liv Chenka, Tania Bell | November 2022 |
Volume 4: Shades of Fear
| 10 | "The Colour of Terror" | Helen Goldwyn | Lizzie Hopley | Ninth Doctor | February 2023 |
| 11 | "The Blooming Menace" | Helen Goldwyn | James Kettle | Ninth Doctor | February 2023 |
| 12 | "Red Darkness" | Helen Goldwyn | Roy Gill | Ninth Doctor, Callen Lennox, Doyle, Vashta Nerada | February 2023 |

==== Series 3 (2023–2024) ====
| No. | Title | Directed by | Written by | Featuring | Released |
|---|---|---|---|---|---|
Volume 1: Pioneers
| 1 | "The Green Gift" | Helen Goldwyn | Roy Gill | Ninth Doctor, Callen, Doyle, Giant Maggots | May 2023 |
| 2 | "Northern Lights" | Helen Goldwyn | Robert Valentine | Ninth Doctor, Fridtjof Nansen, Hjalmar Johansen | May 2023 |
| 3 | "The Beautiful Game" | Helen Goldwyn | Katharine Armitage | Ninth Doctor, Daphne | May 2023 |
Volume 2: Travel in Hope
| 4 | "Below There" | Helen Goldwyn | Lauren Mooney and Stewart Pringle | Ninth Doctor, Vyx Leeson | August 2023 |
| 5 | "The Butler Did It" | Helen Goldwyn | James Moran | Ninth Doctor | August 2023 |
| 6 | "Run" | Helen Goldwyn | Robert Valentine | Ninth Doctor, Zzargol, Alpha Centauri | August 2023 |
Volume 3: Buried Threats
| 7 | "A Theatre of Cruelty" | Helen Goldwyn | Lisa McMullin | Ninth Doctor, Antonin Artaud, Beatrice Cenci | February 2024 |
| 8 | "The Running Men" | Helen Goldwyn | Mark Wright | Ninth Doctor, Ambika Desai | February 2024 |
| 9 | "Ancient History" | Helen Goldwyn | Matt Fitton | Ninth Doctor, Bernice Summerfield | February 2024 |
Volume 4: Star-Crossed
| 10 | "Swipe Right" | Helen Goldwyn | John Dorney | Ninth Doctor, River Song | May 2024 |
| 11 | "Face of the Apocalypse" | Helen Goldwyn | Lizzie Hopley | Ninth Doctor, River Song | May 2024 |
| 12 | "Archipelago" | Helen Goldwyn | Tim Foley | Ninth Doctor, River Song | May 2024 |

==== Series 4 (2025–present) ====
| No. | Title | Directed by | Written by | Featuring | Released |
|---|---|---|---|---|---|
| 1 | "Snare" | Helen Goldwyn | Tim Foley | Ninth Doctor, Rose Tyler, Jackie Tyler | August 2025 |
| 2 | "The Last Days of the Powell Estate" | Helen Goldwyn | Timothy X Atack | Ninth Doctor, Rose, Jackie | October 2025 |
| 3 | "Dare You" | Helen Goldwyn | Lisa McMullin | Ninth Doctor, Rose, Jackie | December 2025 |
| 4 | "Cloud Eight" | Helen Goldwyn | Lauren Mooney and Stewart Pringle | Ninth Doctor, Rose | February 2026 |
| 5 | "Pandemonium" | Helen Goldwyn | Katharine Armitage | Ninth Doctor, Rose, Jackie, Samuel Pepys | April 2026 |
| 6 | "Thirteen O'Clock" | Helen Goldwyn | Robert Valentine | Ninth Doctor, Rose, Saffron Windrose | June 2026 |
| 7 | "Dark Tides" | Helen Goldwyn | Tim Foley | Ninth Doctor, Rose | August 2026 |
| 8 | "False Friends" | Helen Goldwyn | Timothy X Atack | Ninth Doctor, Rose, Autons | October 2026 |
| 9 | "The Rag Man" | Helen Goldwyn | Lauren Mooney and Stewart Pringle | Ninth Doctor, Rose, Jackie | December 2026 |
| 10 | TBA | Helen Goldwyn | N/A | Ninth Doctor, Rose | February 2027 |
| 11 | TBA | Helen Goldwyn | N/A | Ninth Doctor, Rose | April 2027 |
| 12 | TBA | Helen Goldwyn | N/A | Ninth Doctor, Rose | June 2027 |

==== Special (2026) ====
| No. | Title | Directed by | Written by | Featuring | Released |
|---|---|---|---|---|---|
| – | "The Wash" | Helen Goldwyn | Robert Valentine | Ninth Doctor, Susan Foreman | December 2026 |

=== The Tenth Doctor Adventures (2016–present) ===
==== Volume 1 (2016) ====
| No. | Title | Directed by | Written by | Featuring | Released |
|---|---|---|---|---|---|
| 1 | "Technophobia" | Nicholas Briggs | Matt Fitton | Tenth Doctor, Donna Noble | May 2016 |
| 2 | "Time Reaver" | Nicholas Briggs | Jenny T Colgan | Tenth Doctor, Donna Noble | May 2016 |
| 3 | "Death and the Queen" | Nicholas Briggs | James Goss | Tenth Doctor, Donna Noble | May 2016 |

==== Volume 2 (2017) ====
| No. | Title | Directed by | Written by | Featuring | Released |
|---|---|---|---|---|---|
| 1 | "Infamy of the Zaross" | Nicholas Briggs | John Dorney | Tenth Doctor, Rose Tyler, Jackie Tyler | November 2017 |
| 2 | "The Sword of the Chevalier" | Nicholas Briggs | Guy Adams | Tenth Doctor, Rose | November 2017 |
| 3 | "Cold Vengeance" | Nicholas Briggs | Matt Fitton | Tenth Doctor, Rose, Ice Warriors | November 2017 |

==== Volume 3 (2019) ====
| No. | Title | Directed by | Written by | Featuring | Released |
|---|---|---|---|---|---|
| 1 | "No Place" | Nicholas Briggs | James Goss | Tenth Doctor, Donna, Sylvia Noble, Wilfred Mott | May 2019 |
| 2 | "One Mile Down" | Nicholas Briggs | Jenny T Colgan | Tenth Doctor, Donna, Judoon | May 2019 |
| 3 | "The Creeping Death" | Nicholas Briggs | Roy Gill | Tenth Doctor, Donna | May 2019 |

==== Special: Out of Time (2020–2022) ====
| No. | Title | Directed by | Written by | Featuring | Released |
|---|---|---|---|---|---|
| 1 | "Out of Time" | Nicholas Briggs | Matt Fitton | Tenth Doctor, Fourth Doctor, Daleks | August 2020 |
| 2 | "The Gates of Hell" | Ken Bentley | David Llewellyn | Tenth Doctor, Fifth Doctor, Cybermen | June 2021 |
| 3 | "Wink" | Ken Bentley | Lisa McMullin | Tenth Doctor, Sixth Doctor, Weeping Angels | June 2022 |

==== Special: The Tenth Doctor and River Song (2020) ====
| No. | Title | Directed by | Written by | Featuring | Released |
|---|---|---|---|---|---|
| 1 | "Expiry Dating" | Nicholas Briggs | James Goss | Tenth Doctor, River Song, Fifth Doctor, Sixth Doctor | November 2020 |
| 2 | "Precious Annihilation" | Nicholas Briggs | Lizzie Hopley | Tenth Doctor, River | November 2020 |
| 3 | "Ghosts" | Nicholas Briggs | Jonathan Morris | Tenth Doctor, River | November 2020 |

==== Special: Dalek Universe (2021) ====
| No. | Title | Directed by | Written by | Featuring | Released |
|---|---|---|---|---|---|
Volume 1
| 1 | "Buying Time" | Ken Bentley | John Dorney | Tenth Doctor, Anya Kingdom, Mark Seven, George Sheldrake, The Nun | April 2021 |
| 2 | "The Wrong Woman" | Ken Bentley | John Dorney | Tenth Doctor, Anya, Mark, George Sheldrake, The Nun | April 2021 |
| 3 | "The House of Kingdom" | Ken Bentley | Andrew Smith | Tenth Doctor, Anya, Mark, Merrick Kingdom, Mechonoids | April 2021 |
Volume 2
| 4 | "Cycle of Destruction" | Ken Bentley | Roy Gill | Tenth Doctor, Anya, Mark, Daleks | July 2021 |
| 5 | "The Trojan Dalek" | Ken Bentley | John Dorney | Tenth Doctor, Anya, Mark, Daleks | July 2021 |
| 6 | "The Lost" | Ken Bentley | Rob Valentine | Tenth Doctor, Anya, Mark, Merrick Kingdom, The Lost | July 2021 |
Volume 3
| 7 | "The First Son" | Ken Bentley | Lizzie Hopley | Tenth Doctor, Anya, River Song, Movellans, Daleks | October 2021 |
| 8 | "The Dalek Defence" | Ken Bentley | Matt Fitton | Tenth Doctor, Anya, Davros, Daleks, Movellans | October 2021 |
| 9 | "The Triumph of Davros" | Ken Bentley | Matt Fitton | Tenth Doctor, Anya, Davros, Daleks, Movellans | October 2021 |

==== Special: Tenth Doctor, Classic Companions (2022) ====
| No. | Title | Directed by | Written by | Featuring | Released |
|---|---|---|---|---|---|
| 1 | "Splinters" | Helen Goldwyn | John Dorney | Tenth Doctor, K9, Leela | September 2022 |
| 2 | "The Stuntman" | Helen Goldwyn | Lizzie Hopley | Tenth Doctor, K9, Nyssa | September 2022 |
| 3 | "Quantum of Axos" | Helen Goldwyn | Roy Gill | Tenth Doctor, K9, Ace, Axos | September 2022 |

==== Volume 4 (2027–2029) ====
| No. | Title | Directed by | Written by | Featuring | Released |
|---|---|---|---|---|---|
| 1 | "The Hidden" | Ken Bentley | Roy Gill | Tenth Doctor, Rani Chandra | August 2027 |
| 2 | "Empress of the Universe" | Ken Bentley | Lizzie Hopley | Tenth Doctor, Rani Chandra | October 2027 |
| 3 | "In Effects" | Ken Bentley | John Dorney | Tenth Doctor, Rani Chandra | December 2027 |
| 4 | TBA | TBD | TBD | Tenth Doctor | February 2028 |
| 5 | TBA | TBD | TBD | Tenth Doctor | April 2028 |
| 6 | TBA | TBD | TBD | Tenth Doctor | June 2028 |
| 7 | TBA | TBD | TBD | Tenth Doctor | August 2028 |
| 8 | TBA | TBD | TBD | Tenth Doctor | October 2028 |
| 9 | TBA | TBD | TBD | Tenth Doctor | December 2028 |
| 10 | TBA | TBD | TBD | Tenth Doctor | February 2029 |
| 11 | TBA | TBD | TBD | Tenth Doctor | April 2029 |
| 12 | TBA | TBD | TBD | Tenth Doctor | June 2029 |

=== The Eleventh Doctor Adventures (2026–present) ===
On 11 November 2025, Big Finish announced this new range starring Miles Taylor as the Eleventh Doctor with Jasmine Bayes as new companion, Eleanor Fong. It commenced in March 2026. This range is notable as the first of The Doctor Adventures ranges to be released exclusively as a digital download only; previous ranges have been pressed to CD.

==== Series 1: The First Question (2026) ====
| No. | Title | Directed by | Written by | Featuring | Released |
|---|---|---|---|---|---|
| 1 | "The Final Cut" | Nicholas Briggs | Lisa McMullin, from a story by Max Kashevsky | Eleventh Doctor, Eleanor Fong | March 2026 |
| 2 | "The Tourist Trap" | Nicholas Briggs | Beth Axford | Eleventh Doctor, Eleanor Fong | March 2026 |
| 3 | "A Delusion of Witches" | Nicholas Briggs | Lisa McMullin | Eleventh Doctor, Eleanor Fong | March 2026 |

==== Series 2: Hidden in Plain Sight (2026) ====
| No. | Title | Directed by | Written by | Featuring | Released |
|---|---|---|---|---|---|
| 1 | "Tyranny of the Judoon" | Nicholas Briggs | Ben Tedds | Eleventh Doctor, Eleanor, Judoon, Slitheen | August 2026 |
| 2 | "Gambit of the Judoon" | Nicholas Briggs | Ben Tedds | Eleventh Doctor, Eleanor, Judoon, Slitheen | August 2026 |
| 3 | "Wanted Dead and Alive" | Nicholas Briggs | Beth Axford | Eleventh Doctor, Eleanor, Judoon | August 2026 |

==== Series 3: Into the Shadows (2027) ====
| No. | Title | Directed by | Written by | Featuring | Released |
|---|---|---|---|---|---|
| 1 | "Prisoners of the Deep" | Nicholas Briggs | Alan Ronald | Eleventh Doctor, Eleanor Fong | January 2027 |
| 2 | "Johnny Jeffries is the Doctor!" | Nicholas Briggs | Joshua Scales | Eleventh Doctor, Eleanor Fong | January 2027 |
| 3 | "The Slithers of Doubt" | Nicholas Briggs | Joshua Scales | Eleventh Doctor, Eleanor Fong | January 2027 |

=== The Twelfth Doctor Adventures (2026–present) ===
On 12 December 2025, Big Finish announced this new range starring Jon Culshaw as the Twelfth Doctor with Gwithian Evans as new companion, Ash Wilton. It is set to commence July 2026.

==== Series 1: Run Fast, Be Kind (2026) ====
| No. | Title | Directed by | Written by | Featuring | Released |
|---|---|---|---|---|---|
| 1 | "The Second Death" | Lisa Bowerman | Alfie Shaw | Twelfth Doctor, Ash Wilton | July 2026 |
| 2 | "The Broken Man" | Lisa Bowerman | Rochana Patel | Twelfth Doctor, Ash | July 2026 |
| 3 | "The Beautiful and the Damned" | Lisa Bowerman | Katherine White | Twelfth Doctor, Ash | July 2026 |
| 4 | "Wings of Steel" | Lisa Bowerman | Alfie Shaw, based on a story by Alex Hewitt | Twelfth Doctor, Ash, Krillitanes | August 2026 |
| 5 | "Duty of Care" | Lisa Bowerman | Christian Markham | Twelfth Doctor, Ash | August 2026 |
| 6 | "The Second Death of the Daleks" | Lisa Bowerman | Alfie Shaw | Twelfth Doctor, Ash, Daleks | August 2026 |

=== The Thirteenth Doctor Adventures (2025–present) ===
In July 2024, Big Finish announced they would be producing stories featuring Jodie Whittaker as the Thirteenth Doctor and Mandip Gill as companion Yasmin Khan commencing July 2025.

| No. | Title | Directed by | Written by | Featuring | Released |
|---|---|---|---|---|---|
| 1 | "Vampire Weekend" | Ken Bentley | Tim Foley | Thirteenth Doctor, Yasmin Khan | July 2025 |
| 2 | "The Return of the Doctor" | Bethany Weimers | Rory Thomas-Howes | Thirteenth Doctor, Yaz | September 2025 |
| 3 | "Lionesses in Winter" | Steven Kavuma | Lisa McMullin | Thirteenth Doctor, Yaz | November 2025 |
| 4 | "Ride or Die" | Ken Bentley | Rochana Patel | Thirteenth Doctor, Yaz | January 2026 |
| 5 | "The Violet Hour" | Ken Bentley | Rafaella Marcus | Thirteenth Doctor, Yaz | March 2026 |
| 6 | "Aegis" | Ken Bentley | Noga Flaishon | Thirteenth Doctor, Yaz | May 2026 |
| 7 | "The Hallamshire Incident" | Ken Bentley | Rochana Patel | Thirteenth Doctor, Yaz, Sonya Khan, DI Patricia Menzies, Ice Warriors | July 2026 |
| 8 | "The Greatest Train Robbery" | Ken Bentley | Karissa Hamilton-Bannis | Thirteenth Doctor, Yaz | September 2026 |
| 9 | "Armageddon Dawn" | Ken Bentley | Matt Fitton | Thirteenth Doctor, Yaz, Daleks | November 2026 |
| 10 | "Envy in Gold Rings" | Ken Bentley | John Dorney | Thirteenth Doctor, Yaz | January 2027 |
| 11 | TBA | TBD | TBD | Thirteenth Doctor, Yaz | March 2027 |
| 12 | TBA | TBD | TBD | Thirteenth Doctor, Yaz | May 2027 |

=== The Fugitive Doctor (2025–present) ===
On 23 April 2022, Big Finish announced two box sets starring Jo Martin as the Fugitive Doctor.

==== Series 1: Most Wanted (2025) ====
| No. | Title | Directed by | Written by | Featuring | Released |
|---|---|---|---|---|---|
| 1 | "Fast Times" | Bethany Weimers | Robert Valentine | Fugitive Doctor, Cosmogon, Daleks | January 2025 |
| 2 | "The Legend of Baba Yaga" | Bethany Weimers | Rochana Patel | Fugitive Doctor, Baba Yaga | January 2025 |
| 3 | "The Dimension of Lost Things" | Bethany Weimers | Lisa McMullin | Fugitive Doctor, Cosmogon | January 2025 |

==== Series 2: Dead or Alive (2025) ====
| No. | Title | Directed by | Written by | Featuring | Released |
|---|---|---|---|---|---|
| 1 | "Flying Solo" | Bethany Weimers | Tajinder Singh Hayer | Fugitive Doctor, Cosmogon, Alexander the Great | July 2025 |
| 2 | "The Junkyard Loop" | Bethany Weimers | Aaron Douglas | Fugitive Doctor, Cosmogon | July 2025 |
| 3 | "Hereafter" | Bethany Weimers | Tim Foley | Fugitive Doctor, Cosmogon | July 2025 |

==== Series 3: Running Wild (2026) ====
| No. | Title | Directed by | Written by | Featuring | Released |
|---|---|---|---|---|---|
| 1 | "Tholos" | Bethany Weimers | Alex Hewittt | Fugitive Doctor, Cosmogon | November 2026 |
| 2 | "Scripture" | Bethany Weimers | Katharine Armitage | Fugitive Doctor, Cosmogon | November 2026 |
| 3 | "Genesis of the Doctor" | Bethany Weimers | Rochana Patel | Fugitive Doctor, Cosmogon | November 2026 |

=== Destiny of the Doctor (2013) ===
Produced for AudioGo to celebrate Doctor Who's 50th anniversary, it was the first series produced by Big Finish to feature Doctors from the revived series.

| No. | Title | Directed by | Written by | Featuring | Released |
|---|---|---|---|---|---|
| 1 | "Hunters of Earth" | John Ainsworth | Nigel Robinson | First Doctor, Susan | January 2013 |
Shoreditch, London, 1963. The Beatles have beaten John Smith and the Common Men to No. 1 and satellites are being launched in outer space. Back down on Earth, strange goings-on are occurring: the normally placid teenagers of Coal Hill are running riot and a master thief is stealing highly specialised equipment. Featuring Carole Ann Ford and Tam Williams.
| 2 | "Shadow of Death" | John Ainsworth | Simon Guerrier | Second Doctor, Jamie and Zoe | February 2013 |
Following an emergency landing, the TARDIS arrives on a remote world orbiting a peculiar star – a pulsar which exerts an enormous gravitational force, strong enough to warp time. Featuring Frazer Hines and Evie Dawnay.
| 3 | "Vengeance of the Stones" | John Ainsworth | Andrew Smith | Third Doctor, the Brigadier and Mike Yates | March 2013 |
Two RAF fighter jets are on a training flight over North East Scotland when one of them is plucked from the air and promptly disappears. UNIT are called in, and the Doctor and Brigadier Lethbridge-Stewart are soon on the scene. They enlist the help of a local military officer – a young lieutenant by the name of Mike Yates. Featuring Richard Franklin and Trevor Littledale.
| 4 | "Babblesphere" | John Ainsworth | Jonathan Morris | Fourth Doctor, Romana II | April 2013 |
The violent, volcanic world of Hephastos is home to a colony of composers, painters, authors and poets, all striving to create the greatest works of art the universe has ever seen. But in pursuit of their goal, artistic collaboration has been taken a stage too far... Featuring Lalla Ward and Roger Parrott.
| 5 | "Smoke and Mirrors" | John Ainsworth | Steve Lyons | Fifth Doctor, Tegan, Adric and Nyssa | May 2013 |
The Doctor answers a psionic distress call being sent from England in the 1920s. There, in the environs of a fairground, he is reunited with an old friend: Harry Houdini. To Adric and Nyssa the name means very little, but to the Doctor’s companion Tegan he is a legend. Escape artist extraordinaire, Houdini’s reputation will last for decades. Featuring Janet Fielding and Tim Beckmann.
| 6 | "Trouble in Paradise" | John Ainsworth | Nev Fountain | Sixth Doctor, Peri | June 2013 |
Responding to a desperate summons from the Doctor's future self, he and Peri find themselves on a sailing ship in 1492, where the crewmen are gripped by superstitious fear. Featuring Nicola Bryant and Cameron Stewart.
| 7 | "Shockwave" | John Ainsworth | James Swallow | Seventh Doctor, Ace | July 2013 |
In the far future, the inhabitants of Tarsus Six face a desperate struggle to evacuate their world before their sun, Tarsus Ultra, collapses into a cataclysmic spatial anomaly. Featuring Sophie Aldred and Ian Brooker.
| 8 | "Enemy Aliens" | John Ainsworth | Alan Barnes | Eighth Doctor, Charley | August 2013 |
1935: a message from a Time Lord in trouble sends the Eighth Doctor and Charlotte ‘Charley’ Pollard to the streets of London’s West End, in search of a mysterious alien adversary – unaware that something monstrous is already on their trail. Featuring India Fisher and Michael Maloney.
| 9 | "Night of the Whisper" | John Ainsworth | Cavan Scott and Mark Wright | Ninth Doctor, Rose and Captain Jack | September 2013 |
New Vegas, 23rd Century – a sprawling city huddling beneath an artificial atmospheric bubble on a distant moon. Pleasure seekers flock there from every corner of the galaxy, to take in the shows and play the tables in the huge casinos. But beneath the glitz and the glitter, organised crime rules the streets. Featuring Nicholas Briggs and John Schwab.
| 10 | "Death's Deal" | John Ainsworth | Darren Jones | Tenth Doctor, Donna | October 2013 |
Responding to multiple maydays, the TARDIS lands on the planet of Death’s Deal, but the distress calls are old, the final echoes of terrified lost souls. This is an exotic world of lethal creatures, nicknamed ‘The Deadliest Planet in the Galaxy’, and only the brave, foolhardy or greedy would ever dare to visit. Featuring Catherine Tate and Duncan Wisbey.
| 11 | "The Time Machine" | John Ainsworth | Matt Fitton | Eleventh Doctor, Clara | November 2013 |
23 November 2013. In an Oxford laboratory, graduate Alice Watson helps Professor Chivers assemble the final pieces of an impossible machine. A time machine. (Release of this title was disrupted. See above for details.) Featuring Jenna Coleman, Nicholas Briggs and Michael Cochrane.

=== The Doctor Chronicles (2017–2024) ===
==== The Ninth Doctor Chronicles (2017) ====
Four new stories from the Ninth Doctor's era, performed by Nicholas Briggs. Featuring Bruno Langley as Adam Mitchell and Camille Coduri as Jackie Tyler.

| No. | Title | Directed by | Written by | Featuring | Released |
|---|---|---|---|---|---|
Volume 1
| 1 | "The Bleeding Heart" | Helen Goldwyn | Cavan Scott | Ninth Doctor, Adriana Jarsdel | May 2017 |
| 2 | "The Window on the Moor" | Helen Goldwyn | Una McCormack | Ninth Doctor, Rose Tyler, Emily Brontë | May 2017 |
| 3 | "The Other Side" | Helen Goldwyn | Scott Handcock | Ninth Doctor, Rose, Adam Mitchell | May 2017 |
| 4 | "Retail Therapy" | Helen Goldwyn | James Goss | Ninth Doctor, Rose, Jackie Tyler | May 2017 |

==== The Tenth Doctor Chronicles (2018–2023) ====
===== Volume 1 (2018) =====
Four narrated stories set in the Tenth Doctor era, performed by Jacob Dudman. Featuring Jacqueline King as Sylvia Noble, Michelle Ryan as Lady Christina de Souza and Jon Culshaw.

| No. | Title | Directed by | Written by | Featuring | Released |
|---|---|---|---|---|---|
| 1 | "The Taste of Death" | Helen Goldwyn | Helen Goldwyn | Tenth Doctor, Rose Tyler | April 2018 |
| 2 | "Back Track" | Helen Goldwyn | Matthew J Elliott | Tenth Doctor, Martha Jones | April 2018 |
| 3 | "Wild Pastures" | Helen Goldwyn | James Goss | Tenth Doctor, Sylvia Noble | April 2018 |
| 4 | "Last Chance" | Helen Goldwyn | Guy Adams | Tenth Doctor, Lady Christina de Souza | April 2018 |

===== Volume 2: Defender of the Earth (2023) =====
| No. | Title | Directed by | Written by | Featuring | Released |
|---|---|---|---|---|---|
| 1 | "The Thing in the Forest" | Helen Goldwyn | Trevor Baxendale | Tenth Doctor | November 2023 |
| 2 | "The Opacity Factor" | Helen Goldwyn | Carl Rowens | Tenth Doctor | November 2023 |
| 3 | "Freedom of Death" | Helen Goldwyn | Alice Cavender | Tenth Doctor | November 2023 |
| 4 | "The Siege of Shackleton" | Helen Goldwyn | Una McCormack | Tenth Doctor | November 2023 |

==== The Eleventh Doctor Chronicles (2018–2024) ====
===== Volume 1 (2018) =====
Four narrated stories set in the Eleventh Doctor era, performed by Jacob Dudman. Featuring Danny Horn as Kazran Sardick and Simon Fisher-Becker as Dorium Maldovar

| No. | Title | Directed by | Written by | Featuring | Released |
|---|---|---|---|---|---|
| 1 | "The Calendar Man" | Helen Goldwyn | AK Benedict | Eleventh Doctor, Amy Pond | August 2018 |
| 2 | "The Top of the Tree" | Helen Goldwyn | Simon Guerrier | Eleventh Doctor, Kazran Sardick | August 2018 |
| 3 | "The Light Keepers" | Helen Goldwyn | Roy Gill | Eleventh Doctor, Dorium Maldovar | August 2018 |
| 4 | "False Coronets" | Helen Goldwyn | Alice Cavender | Eleventh Doctor, Clara Oswald, Jane Austen | August 2018 |

===== Volume 2 (2021) =====
In a change to previous titles in the range, this set was the first to consist of four stories as full cast audio dramas as opposed to narrated, with Jacob Dudman as The Eleventh Doctor.

| No. | Title | Directed by | Written by | Featuring | Released |
|---|---|---|---|---|---|
| 1 | "The Evolving Dead" | Nicholas Briggs | Doris V Sutherland | Eleventh Doctor | September 2021 |
| 2 | "The Day Before They Came" | Nicholas Briggs | Daniel Blythe | Eleventh Doctor | September 2021 |
| 3 | "The Melting Pot" | Nicholas Briggs | Christopher Cooper | Eleventh Doctor | September 2021 |
| 4 | "A Tragical History" | Nicholas Briggs | Tessa North | Eleventh Doctor | September 2021 |

===== Volume 3: Geronimo! (2022) =====
| No. | Title | Directed by | Written by | Featuring | Released |
|---|---|---|---|---|---|
| 1 | "The Inheritance" | Nicholas Briggs | Alfie Shaw | Eleventh Doctor, Valarie Lockwood | October 2022 |
| 2 | "The House of Masks" | Nicholas Briggs | Georgia Cook | Eleventh Doctor, Valarie Lockwood | October 2022 |
| 3 | "The End" | Nicholas Briggs | Rochana Patel | Eleventh Doctor, Valarie Lockwood | October 2022 |

===== Volume 4: All of Time and Space (2023) =====
| No. | Title | Directed by | Written by | Featuring | Released |
|---|---|---|---|---|---|
| 1 | "All of Time and Space" | Nicholas Briggs | Ellery Quest | Eleventh Doctor, Valarie | February 2023 |
| 2 | "The Yearn" | Nicholas Briggs | Angus Duncan | Eleventh Doctor, Valarie | February 2023 |
| 3 | "Curiosity Shop" | Nicholas Briggs | James Goss | Eleventh Doctor, Valarie | February 2023 |
| 4 | "Broken Hearts" (Note: Released as an exclusive download.) | Helen Goldwyn | Lisa McMullin | Eleventh Doctor, Valarie | November 2023 |

===== Volume 5: Everywhere and Anywhere (2023) =====
| No. | Title | Directed by | Written by | Featuring | Released |
|---|---|---|---|---|---|
| 1 | "Spirit of the Season" | Helen Goldwyn | Georgia Cook | Eleventh Doctor, Valarie, Clara | December 2023 |
| 2 | "All's Fair" | Helen Goldwyn | Max Kashevsky | Eleventh Doctor, Valarie | December 2023 |
| 3 | "Sins of the Flesh" | Helen Goldwyn | Alfie Shaw | Eleventh Doctor, Valarie, Cybermen | December 2023 |

===== Volume 6: Victory of the Doctor (2024) =====
Volume 6 of The Eleventh Doctor Chronicles was the final boxset where Jacob Dudman portrayed the Eleventh Doctor for the range.

| No. | Title | Directed by | Written by | Featuring | Released |
|---|---|---|---|---|---|
| 1 | "Didn't You Kill My Mother?" | Helen Goldwyn | John Dorney | Eleventh Doctor, Valarie | February 2024 |
| 2 | "Daleks Victorius" | Helen Goldwyn | Felecia Barker | Eleventh Doctor, Valarie, Daleks | February 2024 |
| 3 | "The Last Stand of Miss Valarie Lockwood" | Helen Goldwyn | Alfie Shaw | Eleventh Doctor, Valarie | February 2024 |
| 4 | "Victory of the Doctor" | Helen Goldwyn | Alfie Shaw | Eleventh Doctor | February 2024 |

==== The Twelfth Doctor Chronicles (2020–2024) ====
===== Volume 1 (2020) =====
Four narrated stories set in the Twelfth Doctor era, performed by Jacob Dudman. Featuring Samuel Anderson as Danny Pink and Ingrid Oliver as Osgood.

| No. | Title | Directed by | Written by | Featuring | Released |
|---|---|---|---|---|---|
| 1 | "The Charge of the Night Brigade" | Helen Goldwyn | David Llewellyn | Twelfth Doctor, Mary Seacole | February 2020 |
| 2 | "War Wounds" | Helen Goldwyn | Mark Wright | Twelfth Doctor, Danny Pink | February 2020 |
| 3 | "Distant Voices" | Helen Goldwyn | Lizbeth Myles | Twelfth Doctor | February 2020 |
| 4 | "Field Trip" | Helen Goldwyn | Una McCormack | Twelfth Doctor, Osgood | February 2020 |

===== Volume 2: Timejacked! (2021) =====
As with volume two of The Eleventh Doctor Chronicles, this release sees Dudman playing the Twelfth Doctor in full cast productions with no narrator.

| No. | Title | Directed by | Written by | Featuring | Released |
|---|---|---|---|---|---|
| 1 | "Flight to Calandra" | Helen Goldwyn | Matt Fitton | Twelfth Doctor, Keira Sanstrom | November 2021 |
| 2 | "Split Second" | Helen Goldwyn | Lou Morgan | Twelfth Doctor, Keira Sanstrom | November 2021 |
| 3 | "The Weight of History" | Helen Goldwyn | Lou Morgan | Twelfth Doctor, Keira Sanstrom | November 2021 |

===== Volume 3: You Only Die Twice (2024) =====
This boxset was Jacob Dudman's final work for the range as the Twelfth Doctor.

| No. | Title | Directed by | Written by | Featuring | Released |
|---|---|---|---|---|---|
| 1 | "Sunstrike" | Lisa Bowerman | Georgia Cook | Twelfth Doctor | March 2024 |
| 2 | "Never the End Is" | Lisa Bowerman | Ben Tedds | Twelfth Doctor | March 2024 |
| 3 | "You Only Die Twice" | Lisa Bowerman | Fio Trethewey | Twelfth Doctor | March 2024 |

=== Once and Future (2023–2024) ===
| No. | Title | Directed by | Written by | Featuring | Released |
|---|---|---|---|---|---|
| 1 | "Past Lives" | Helen Goldwyn | Robert Valentine | Fourth Doctor, Sarah Jane Smith, Kate Stewart, Osgood, The Monk | May 2023 |
| 2 | "The Artist at the End of Time" | Ken Bentley | James Goss | Fifth Doctor, Jenny, The Curator | June 2023 |
| 3 | "A Genius for War" | Helen Goldwyn | Jonathan Morris | Seventh Doctor, The General, Veklin, Davros, Daleks | July 2023 |
| 4 | "Two's Company" | Helen Goldwyn | Lisa McMullin | Sixth Doctor, Jackie Tyler, Lady Christina de Souza, The Two | August 2023 |
| 5 | "The Martian Invasion of Planetoid 50" | Ken Bentley | Jonathan Barnes | Tenth Doctor, Missy, Paternoster Gang | September 2023 |
| 6 | "Time Lord Immemorial" | Helen Goldwyn | Lisa McMullin | Ninth Doctor, Unbound Doctor, The Lumiat, Liv Chenka | October 2023 |
| 7 | "The Union" | Ken Bentley | Matt Fitton | Eighth Doctor, Fourth Doctor, Susan Foreman, River Song, The Monk, The Two, The Union | October 2023 |
| 8 | "Coda - The Final Act" | Helen Goldwyn | Tim Foley | War Doctor, Fugitive Doctor, Bernice Summerfield, Vienna Salvatori, Elizabeth I, Voord | November 2024 |

=== The War Doctor (2015–present) ===
==== The War Doctor Series 1: Only the Monstrous (2015) ====
| No. | Title | Directed by | Written by | Featuring | Released |
|---|---|---|---|---|---|
| 1 | "The Innocent" | Nicholas Briggs | Nicholas Briggs | War Doctor, Rejoice, Ollistra, Daleks | December 2015 |
The Doctor is discovered injured on the planet Keska and is nursed back to health by Rejoice. The planet comes under attack from an enemy and the Doctor assists with the defence.
| 2 | "The Thousand Worlds" | Nicholas Briggs | Nicholas Briggs | War Doctor, Rejoice, Ollistra, Daleks | December 2015 |
The Doctor is sent to retrieve a lost Time Lord strategist from Dalek-controlled space.
| 3 | "The Heart of the Battle" | Nicholas Briggs | Nicholas Briggs | War Doctor, Rejoice, Ollistra, Daleks | December 2015 |
The Doctor is shocked to learn that a Time Lord strategist is attempting to negotiate peace with the Daleks

==== The War Doctor Series 2: Infernal Devices (2016) ====
| No. | Title | Directed by | Written by | Featuring | Released |
|---|---|---|---|---|---|
| 1 | "Legion of the Lost" | Nicholas Briggs | John Dorney | War Doctor, Ollistra, Daleks | February 2016 |
When the Time Lords make a deal with the ancient Technomancers to resurrect their dead soldiers, the Doctor learns that there is more to the Technomancers' agenda.
| 2 | "A Thing of Guile" | Nicholas Briggs | Phil Mulryne | War Doctor, Ollistra, Daleks | February 2016 |
Forced to work for Ollistra as a prisoner of war, the Doctor investigates a Dalek research base.
| 3 | "The Neverwhen" | Nicholas Briggs | Matt Fitton | War Doctor, Ollistra, Daleks | February 2016 |
The Doctor and Ollistra become caught on different sides of a conflict where Time is shifting to such an extent that their weapons are being constantly adjusted.

==== The War Doctor Series 3: Agents of Chaos (2016) ====
| No. | Title | Directed by | Written by | Featuring | Released |
|---|---|---|---|---|---|
| 1 | "The Shadow Vortex" | Nicholas Briggs | David Llewellyn | War Doctor, Ollistra, Daleks, Dalek Time Strategist | October 2016 |
The Doctor tracks a Dalek agent to Berlin in 1961 to try to prevent a plan to change history.
| 2 | "The Eternity Cage" | Nicholas Briggs | Andrew Smith | War Doctor, Heleyna, Ollistra, Daleks, Dalek Time Strategist, Sontarans | October 2016 |
The Doctor must assist a Time Lord strike team in retrieving Ollistra after she's captured by a Sontaran strike force trying to take part in the Time War.
| 3 | "Eye of Harmony" | Nicholas Briggs | Ken Bentley | War Doctor, Helayna, Ollistra, Daleks, Dalek Time Strategist | October 2016 |
The Doctor and Ollistra are trapped on an out-of-control TARDIS as they are forced to face a traitor in the ranks.

==== The War Doctor Series 4: Casualties of War (2017) ====
John Hurt died on 25 January 2017. Recording of the series had been completed and was released posthumously.

| No. | Title | Directed by | Written by | Featuring | Released |
|---|---|---|---|---|---|
| 1 | "Pretty Lies" | Nicholas Briggs | Guy Adams | War Doctor, Ollistra, Daleks | February 2017 |
Trapped on a distant planet, the Doctor and Ollistra must help defend a small colony while bothered by a time-travelling war correspondent.
| 2 | "The Lady of Obsidian" | Nicholas Briggs | Andrew Smith | War Doctor, Ollistra, Leela, Daleks | February 2017 |
The Doctor investigates strange events in the Obsidian Nebula, which reveals that his old companion Leela is still alive despite being presumed dead in the early days of the Time War.
| 3 | "The Enigma Dimension" | Nicholas Briggs | Nicholas Briggs | War Doctor, Ollistra, Leela, the Enigma, Daleks | February 2017 |
The Doctor, Leela and Ollistra must protect Gallifrey from an other-dimensional assault organised by the Daleks.

==== The War Doctor Begins Series 1: Forged in Fire (2021) ====
| No. | Title | Directed by | Written by | Featuring | Released |
|---|---|---|---|---|---|
| 1 | "Light the Flame" | Louise Jameson | Matt Fitton | War Doctor, Tamasan, Ohila, Sisterhood of Karn, Rasmus | June 2021 |
| 2 | "Lion Hearts" | Louise Jameson | Lou Morgan | War Doctor, Tamasan, Tharils | June 2021 |
| 3 | "The Shadow Squad" | Louise Jameson | Andrew Smith | War Doctor, Tamasan, Daleks | June 2021 |

==== The War Doctor Begins Series 2: Warbringer (2021) ====
| No. | Title | Directed by | Written by | Featuring | Released |
|---|---|---|---|---|---|
| 1 | "Consequences" | Louise Jameson | Timothy X Atack | War Doctor, Veklin, Case, Tamasan, Andarta | December 2021 |
| 2 | "Destroyer" | Louise Jameson | Andrew Smith | War Doctor, Veklin, Case, Tamasan, Daleks | December 2021 |
| 3 | "Saviour" | Louise Jameson | Jonathan Morris | War Doctor, Veklin, Case, Rondig, Daleks | December 2021 |

==== The War Doctor Begins Series 3: Battlegrounds (2022) ====
| No. | Title | Directed by | Written by | Featuring | Released |
|---|---|---|---|---|---|
| 1 | "The Keeper of Light" | Louise Jameson | Phil Mulryne | War Doctor, Tamasan, Dorothy, David | May 2022 |
| 2 | "Temmosus" | Louise Jameson | Rossa McPhillips | War Doctor, Tamasan, Thals, Daleks | May 2022 |
| 3 | "Rewind" | Louise Jameson | Timothy X Atack | War Doctor, Tamasan, Daleks | May 2022 |

==== The War Doctor Begins Series 4: He Who Fights With Monsters (2022) ====
| No. | Title | Directed by | Written by | Featuring | Released |
|---|---|---|---|---|---|
| 1 | "The Mission" | Louise Jameson | Robert Valentine | War Doctor, The General, The Barber-Surgeon | December 2022 |
| 2 | "The Abyss" | Louise Jameson | Robert Valentine | War Doctor, Leela, The Barber-Surgeon, Daleks | December 2022 |
| 3 | "The Horror" | Louise Jameson | Robert Valentine | War Doctor, The Barber-Surgeon, Daleks | December 2022 |

==== The War Doctor Begins Series 5: Comrades-in-Arms (2023) ====
| No. | Title | Directed by | Written by | Featuring | Released |
|---|---|---|---|---|---|
| 1 | "Mother's Love" | Barnaby Edwards | Noga Flaishon | War Doctor, Case, Veklin | May 2023 |
| 2 | "Berserker" | Barnaby Edwards | Timothy X Atack | War Doctor, Case, Daleks | May 2023 |
| 3 | "Memnos" | Barnaby Edwards | Phil Mulryne | War Doctor, Case, Daleks, Dalek Time Strategist | May 2023 |

==== The War Doctor Begins Series 6: Enemy Mine (2023) ====
| No. | Title | Directed by | Written by | Featuring | Released |
|---|---|---|---|---|---|
| 1 | "The Hybrid's Choice" | Helen Goldwyn | Ajjaz Awad-Ibrahim | War Doctor, Case, Daleks, Dalek Time Strategist | December 2023 |
| 2 | "Fear Nothing" | Helen Goldwyn | Mark Wright | War Doctor, Case, Tamasan, Daleks, Dalek Time Strategist, | December 2023 |
| 3 | "Exit Strategy" | Helen Goldwyn | Matt Fitton | War Doctor, Eighth Doctor, Case, Daleks, Dalek Time Strategist, The Nurse | December 2023 |

==== The War Doctor Rises Series 1: Morbius the Mighty (2024) ====
| No. | Title | Directed by | Written by | Featuring | Released |
|---|---|---|---|---|---|
| 1 | "Part One" | Bethany Weimers | Tim Foley | War Doctor, Morbius, Daleks | August 2024 |
| 2 | "Part Two" | Bethany Weimers | Tim Foley | War Doctor, Morbius, Daleks | August 2024 |
| 3 | "Part Three" | Bethany Weimers | Tim Foley | War Doctor, Morbius, Daleks | August 2024 |

==== The War Doctor Rises Series 2: Unknown Soldiers (2024) ====
| No. | Title | Directed by | Written by | Featuring | Released |
|---|---|---|---|---|---|
| 1 | "Part One" | Helen Goldwyn | Timothy X Atack | War Doctor, Daleks | December 2024 |
| 2 | "Part Two" | Helen Goldwyn | Timothy X Atack | War Doctor, Daleks | December 2024 |
| 3 | "Part Three" | Helen Goldwyn | Timothy X Atack | War Doctor, Daleks | December 2024 |

==== The War Doctor Rises Series 3: Fallen Heroes (2025) ====
| No. | Title | Directed by | Written by | Featuring | Released |
|---|---|---|---|---|---|
| 1 | "The Dead Sea" | Ken Bentley | Alfie Shaw | War Doctor | May 2025 |
| 2 | "Unit 26" | Ken Bentley | Alfie Shaw | War Doctor | May 2025 |
| 3 | "Yesterday is Tomorrow and Tomorrow is Today" | Ken Bentley | Alfie Shaw | War Doctor | May 2025 |

==== The War Doctor Rises Series 4: Cybergene (2025) ====
| No. | Title | Directed by | Written by | Featuring | Released |
|---|---|---|---|---|---|
| 1 | "Crucible" | Ken Bentley | Jonathan Morris | War Doctor, Cybermen | December 2025 |
| 2 | "Firebreak" | Ken Bentley | Jonathan Morris | War Doctor, Cybermen | December 2025 |
| 3 | "Sepulchre" | Ken Bentley | Jonathan Morris | War Doctor, Cybermen | December 2025 |

==== The War Doctor Rises Series 5: Fear of the Light (2026) ====
| No. | Title | Directed by | Written by | Featuring | Released |
|---|---|---|---|---|---|
| 1 | "The Twilight Enclave" | Ken Bentley | Rochana Patel | War Doctor, The Rani, Daleks | May 2026 |
| 2 | "The Frozen Wastes" | Ken Bentley | Rochana Patel | War Doctor, The Rani, Daleks | May 2026 |
| 3 | "The Burning Lands" | Ken Bentley | Rochana Patel | War Doctor, The Rani, Daleks | May 2026 |

==== The War Doctor Rises Series 6: Serpent's Nest (2026) ====
| No. | Title | Directed by | Written by | Featuring | Released |
|---|---|---|---|---|---|
| 1 | "Wheel of Corruption" | Ken Bentley | Matt Fitton | War Doctor, Veklin, Mara | December 2026 |
| 2 | "Broken Mirrors" | Ken Bentley | Matt Fitton | War Doctor, Veklin, Mara | December 2026 |
| 3 | "Domain of the Snake" | Ken Bentley | Matt Fitton | War Doctor, Veklin, Mara | December 2026 |

=== Circuit Breaker (2026) ===
Circuit Breaker is a multi-platform story starring the Fugitive Doctor, first announced in July 2025. It's a collaboration between BBC Studios, BBC Audio, Big Finish Productions, Doctor Who Magazine, East Side Games, Penguin Random House, and Titan Comics. It started on 25 June 2026 and finished with audio stories by Big Finish Productions in September 2026, featuring a two-hour audio drama finale and two Short Trips stories narrated by Dan Starkey.

| No. | Title | Directed by | Written by | Featuring | Released |
|---|---|---|---|---|---|
| 1 | "Full Circuit" | Barnaby Edwards | Robert Valentine | Fugitive Doctor, Osgood, Kate Stewart, Andrew Turner, Sontarans | September 2026 |
Short Circuits
| 2 | "Battleships" | – | Alex Hewitt | Sontarans | September 2026 |
| 3 | "Get Rich or Die Trying" | – | Alex Hewitt, from a story by Natasha Siegel | Andrew Turner | September 2026 |

=== Time Lord Victorious (2020–2021) ===
The Time Lord Victorious range is a multi-platform story, with further stories released by Penguin Random House, Doctor Who Magazine, Titan Comics, Escape Hunt, a Short Trips release by Big Finish Productions, Eaglemoss Hero Collector, Immersive Everywhere, Maze Theory, BBC Books and BBC Audio.

| No. | Title | Directed by | Written by | Featuring | Released |
|---|---|---|---|---|---|
| – | "Short Trips: Master Thief" | Lisa Bowerman | Fio Trethewey | The Master | October 2020 |
| – | "Short Trips: Lesser Evils" | Lisa Bowerman | Simon Guerrier | The Master | October 2020 |
| 1 | "He Kills Me, He Kills Me Not" | Scott Handcock | Carrie Thompson | Eighth Doctor, Ood | October 2020 |
| 2 | "The Enemy of My Enemy" | Scott Handcock | Tracy Ann Baines | Eighth Doctor, Daleks | November 2020 |
| 3 | "Mutually Assured Destruction" | Scott Handcock | Lizzie Hopley | Eighth Doctor, Daleks | December 2020 |
| 4 | "Genetics of the Daleks" | Jamie Anderson | Jonathan Barnes | Fourth Doctor, Daleks | December 2020 |
| 5 | "Echoes of Extinction" | Scott Handcock | Alfie Shaw | Eighth Doctor, Tenth Doctor | April 2021 |

== See also ==
- Big Finish Productions
- Doctor Who spin-offs
