= Barnaby Edwards =

British actor, writer and director

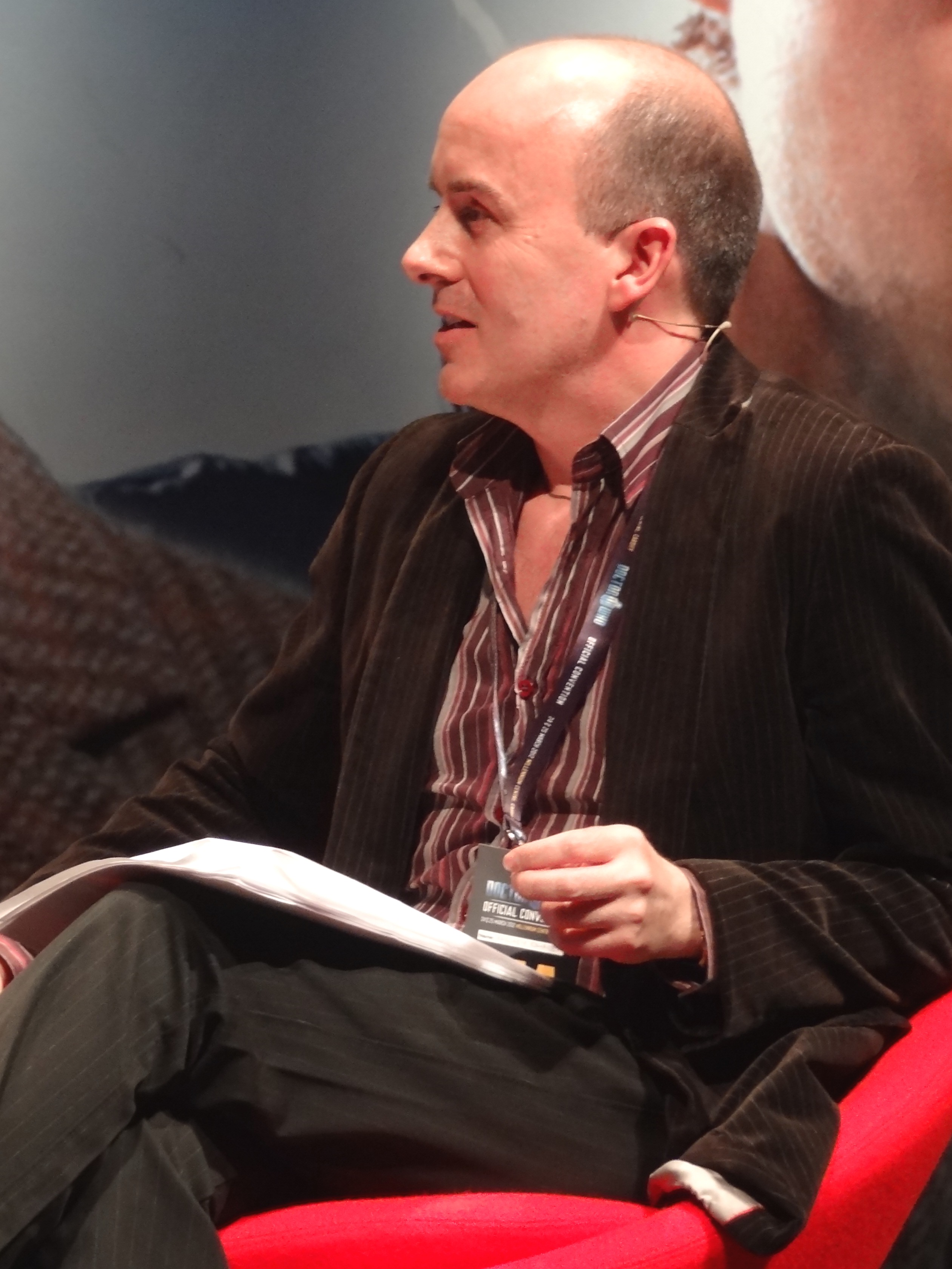
Edwards on stage in Cardiff, March 2012

Barnaby Edwards (born 20 August 1969) is a British actor, writer, director and artist. He is known as a performer for the British science-fiction television series Doctor Who, in the role of a Dalek operator. He has also written, directed, produced or performed in over 80 Big Finish Doctor Who audio stories. Alongside frequent radio and voice over work, Edwards has narrated over 40 unabridged audiobooks for Audible.com and others.

== Early life ==
Edwards graduated from the University of Exeter in 1991 with a degree in Fine Art and French. He subsequently went on to train at the Guildford School of Acting, where he won the Postgraduate Award for Acting in 1992.

== Career ==
Edwards has worked in the theatre, television, radio and audio plays, as a director and writer. Edwards is also an artist and his pictures hang in galleries and private collections across Europe as well as being exhibited widely within the UK. Following a successful show at the Blue Lias gallery in Lyme Regis, Barnaby was asked to form one third of the Three West Country Artists exhibition in 1998. The Kingfisher Gallery in Devon held a major exhibition of his work encompassing nearly thirty new paintings, and in 2006 he exhibited a selection of pieces at the FSA Summer Exhibition.

Edwards regularly lectures on art history and art techniques, both in Britain and farther afield. He has given talks on subjects as diverse as European Narrative Painting, Pastel Techniques, Victorian Sea Paintings, Life Drawing, and Greek and Roman Myths in Western Art. He also gives practical tuition both to individuals and to groups, including art workshops on landscape, figure and still life.

In 2010, Edwards set up Textbook Stuff, specialising in audiobooks of classic short stories and poems. Readers include Miriam Margolyes, Andrew Sachs, Peter Guinness, John Sessions, Nicholas Pegg and David Soul. The company distributes via iTunes, Amazon and other online distributors.

In November 2013 he appeared in the one-off 50th anniversary comedy homage The Five(ish) Doctors Reboot.

Beginning in 2016, Edwards has narrated the audiobook editions of The Bernicia Chronicles, a series of historical novels by author Matthew Harffy.

== Acting ==
=== Film ===
- Children of Men – Ministry of Arts official
- The Merry Wives of Windsor – John Rugby
- The Plotters – Robert Keyes
- Shadows of a Stranger – Marley's Ghost

=== Television ===
- Doctor Who (BBC) – principal Dalek operator (2005 onwards)
- Children in Need (BBC) – Dalek operator
- Children's BAFTAs (BBC) – Dalek operator
- Doctor Who Confidential (BBC) – as himself
- Totally Doctor Who (BBC) – as himself
- The Giblet Boys (cITV) – Jeweller
- The Why Files (LIVE TV) – Hoax Interviewees
- EastEnders (BBC) – Queen Vic darts captain
- Thirty Years in the TARDIS (BBC) – Dalek operator
- The Five(ish) Doctors Reboot – Himself

=== Theatre ===
- The Merry Wives of Windsor – John Rugby (at Shakespeare's Globe and in LA & New York)
- Season's Greetings – actor and artistic director
- Hamlet – actor
- Twelfth Night – actor
- Macbeth – actor
- The Amazing Tale of Good King Wenceslas and Sleigh Rider – actor
- Rope – actor

=== Radio ===
- Dick Barton – actor
- The Father of English Football – actor
- Dostoevsky – actor
- Cultural Baggage – actor

=== Doctor Who audio plays (Fifth Doctor) ===
- Loups-Garoux – Victor
- The Eternal Summer – Vicar

=== Doctor Who audio plays (Sixth Doctor) ===
- The Marian Conspiracy – Francois de Noailles
- The Spectre of Lanyon Moor – Philip Ludgate
- Assassin in the Limelight – The Traveller

=== Doctor Who audio plays (Seventh Doctor) ===
- Bang-Bang-a-Boom! – Robot Waiter

=== Doctor Who audio plays (Eighth Doctor) ===
- Storm Warning – Rathbone
- Sword of Orion – Digley
- The Stones of Venice – Pietro
- Minuet in Hell – Scott
- Shada – Professor Caldera
- Horror of Glam Rock – Bendy Roger
- Human Resources – Clive
- Max Warp – Announcer
- Brave New Town – The Voice
- Grand Theft Cosmos – The Guardian
- Sisters of the Flame – Galactinet
- Hothouse – Newsreader
- The Eight Truths – Newsreader
- Worldwide Web – Newsreader

=== Other audio plays ===
- Bernice Summerfield: Beyond the Sun – Leon
- Bernice Summerfield: Walking To Babylon – John Lafayette
- Bernice Summerfield: Birthright – John Lafayette
- Cyberman: Scorpius – Paul Hunt
- Cyberman: Fear – Paul Hunt
- Cyberman: Conversion – Paul Hunt
- Cyberman: Telos – Paul Hunt
- Cyberman 2: Outsiders – Paul Hunt
- Cyberman 2: Terror – Paul Hunt
- Cyberman 2: Machines – Paul Hunt
- Cyberman 2: Extinction – Paul Hunt

== Directing ==
=== Television/film/video ===
- Bacardi: The Making of a Commercial
- The Dolphin Myth
- In-store Credit

=== Theatre ===
- Cinderella
- Puss in Boots
- Snow White and the Seven Dwarfs
- Aladdin
- The Winslow Boy
- Office Suite
- Absent Friends
- English Sketches
- Kicking Bardom

"Mad Men r Crazy"

=== Audiobooks (drama) ===
- The Waringham Chronicles.

=== Textbook Stuff audiobooks (horror) ===
- Charles Dickens: The Signalman & Other Ghostly Tales
- Bram Stoker: Dracula's Guest & Other Dark Tales
- Edgar Allan Poe: The Pit and the Pendulum & Other Macabre Tales
- M. R. James: Casting the Runes & Other Uncanny Tales
- Sheridan Le Fanu: Carmilla

=== Textbook Stuff audiobooks (poetry) ===
- Edward Thomas: Selected Poems
- Christina Rossetti: Selected Poems
- Andrew Marvell: Selected Poems
- Robert Browning: Selected Poems
- The Brontës: Selected Poems

=== Textbook Stuff audiobooks (non-fiction) ===
- Karl Marx & Friedrich Engels: The Communist Manifesto

=== Radio plays ===
- The Phantom of the Opera (broadcast on BBC7)

=== Doctor Who audio plays (Fifth Doctor) ===
- Exotron
- Son of the Dragon
- The Mind's Eye
- The Bride of Peladon
- The Haunting of Thomas Brewster
- The Boy That Time Forgot
- Time Reef
- Return to the Web Planet
- Castle of Fear
- The Eternal Summer
- Plague of the Daleks
- Cobwebs
- The Whispering Forest
- Cradle of the Snake

=== Doctor Who audio plays (Sixth Doctor) ===
- Doctor Who and the Pirates
- Assassin in the Limelight
- The Doomwood Curse
- Paradise 5
- The Wreck of the Titan

=== Doctor Who audio plays (Seventh Doctor) ===
- Frozen Time

=== Doctor Who audio plays (Eighth Doctor) ===
- The Chimes of Midnight (broadcast on BBC7)
- Absolution
- The Girl Who Never Was
- Horror of Glam Rock (broadcast on BBC7)
- Phobos (broadcast on BBC7)
- Dead London (broadcast on BBC7)
- Max Warp (broadcast on BBC7)
- The Skull of Sobek (broadcast on BBC7)
- Grand Theft Cosmos (broadcast on BBC7)
- The Zygon Who Fell to Earth (broadcast on BBC7)
- Hothouse
- The Beast of Orlok
- Death in Blackpool
- The Book of Kells
- Deimos
- The Greater Good

== Writing ==
=== Television/film/video ===
- Bacardi: The Making of a Commercial
- The Dolphin Myth
- In-store Credit

=== Theatre ===
- English Sketches
- Kicking Bardom

=== Radio plays ===
- The Phantom of the Opera (broadcast on BBC7)

=== Doctor Who audio plays (Fifth Doctor) ===
- The Bride of Peladon
- The Emerald Tiger

=== Doctor Who audio plays (Sixth Doctor) ===
- The Wreck of the Titan

=== Doctor Who audio plays (Eighth Doctor) ===
- The Beast of Orlok
- The Book of Kells

== Personal life ==
Edwards' long-term partner is actor Nicholas Pegg. Guesting at the 2017 Pride Cymru event Who's Queer Now, a symposium celebrating the impact and influences of Doctor Who on LGBT people, the couple revealed that they were celebrating their 25th anniversary.
