= The Crooked World =

2002 novel by Steve Lyons

- Author: Steve Lyons
- Series: Doctor Who book: Eighth Doctor Adventures
- Release number: 57
- Subject: Featuring: Eighth Doctor; Fitz and Anji
- Publisher: BBC Books
- Publication date: June 2002
- Pages: 288
- ISBN: 0-563-53856-2
- Preceded by: The Book of the Still
- Followed by: History 101

The Crooked World is a BBC Books original novel written by Steve Lyons and based on the long-running British science fiction television series Doctor Who. It features the Eighth Doctor, Fitz and Anji.

== Plot ==
The Doctor accidentally brings the concept of reality to a world based on cartoon physics.

== Continuity ==
- The concept of a person's belief affecting a creature also featured in Lyons's previous novel Salvation.

== Outside references ==
- All the characters are parodies of popular cartoon characters, though none are mentioned by name.

== Reception ==
In Interzone, Matt Hills writes, "Lyon's tenth Who novel seems at first as if it is going to be a very long set of tiresome in-jokes and references. But it opens out into a sharply drawn meditation on social justice and individual guilt, as well as dealing with the cultural transmission of ideas."
