= Steve Lyons (writer) =

British writer

- Born: United Kingdom
- Occupation: Writer
- Language: English
- Genre: Science fiction, reference

Steve Lyons is a British writer. He has written several Doctor Who spin-off novels, as well as programme guides for Star Trek, Red Dwarf and Blackadder. His Doctor Who spin-off novels include the New Series Adventure The Stealers of Dreams.

== Doctor Who novels ==
=== Virgin New Adventures ===
- Conundrum (1994 ISBN 0-426-20408-5)
- Head Games (1995 ISBN 0-426-20454-9)

=== Virgin Missing Adventures ===
- Time of Your Life (1995 ISBN 0-426-20438-7)
- Killing Ground (1996 ISBN 0-426-20474-3)

=== Past Doctor Adventures ===
- The Murder Game (1997 ISBN 0-563-40565-1)
- The Witch Hunters (1998 ISBN 0-563-40579-1)
- Salvation (1999 ISBN 0-563-55566-1)
- The Final Sanction (1999 ISBN 0-563-55584-X)

=== Eighth Doctor Adventures ===
- The Space Age (2000 ISBN 0-563-53800-7)
- The Crooked World (2002 ISBN 0-563-53856-2)

=== New Series Adventures ===
- The Stealers of Dreams (2005 ISBN 0-563-48638-4)

== Doctor Who comics ==
- Doctor Who Adventures ongoing comic strip (2010)

== Doctor Who audio ==
- The Fires of Vulcan (2000)
- Colditz (2001)
- The Ratings War (2002)
- Time Works (2006)
- Blood of the Daleks (2006)
- Son of the Dragon (2007)
- Resistance (2009)
- The Architects of History (2010)
- The Selachian Gambit (2012)
- Day of the Cockroach (2012)
- House of Cards (2013)
- Smoke and Mirrors (2013)

== Other ==
- Doctor Who: The Completely Useless Encyclopedia with Chris Howarth (1996 ISBN 0-426-20485-9)
- Red Dwarf Programme Guide with Chris Howarth (1997 ISBN 0-7535-0103-1)
- The Completely Useless Star Trek Encyclopaedia with Chris Howarth (1997 ISBN 0-7535-0198-8)
- Cunning: The "Blackadder" Programme Guide with Chris Howarth (2002 ISBN 0-7535-0447-2)
- The Legacy Quest: Book 1 (2002 ISBN 0-7434-4468-X)
- The Legacy Quest: Book 2 (2002 ISBN 0-7434-5243-7)
- The Legacy Quest: Book 3 (2002 ISBN 0-7434-5266-6)
- The Power of Fear - a Tomorrow People audio drama by Big Finish Productions (2003)
- The Micronauts: The Time Traveller Trilogy Book 1 (2003 ISBN 0-7434-5840-0)
- The Micronauts: The Time Traveller Trilogy Book 2 (2003 ISBN 0-7434-7466-X)
- The Micronauts: The Time Traveller Trilogy Book 3 (2004 ISBN 0-7434-7917-3)
- Sapphire and Steel: The Passenger a Sapphire & Steel audio drama by Big Finish Productions (2005)
- Sapphire and Steel: Perfect Day an audio drama by Big Finish Productions (2006)
- Sapphire and Steel: Zero an audio drama by Big Finish Productions (2008)
- Death World - a Warhammer 40,000 novel (2006 ISBN 978-1-84416-398-4)
- Dead Men Walking - a Warhammer 40,000 novel (2010 ISBN 978-1-84970-011-5)
- Stargate SG-1: Infiltration an audio drama by Big Finish Productions (2012)
- Blake's 7: Jenna's Story an audio drama by Big Finish Productions (2013)
- Blake's 7: Velandra an audio drama by Big Finish Productions (2014)
- Blake's 7: Devil's Advocate an audio drama by Big Finish Productions (2015)
- Vienna: Impossibly Glamorous an audio drama by Big Finish Productions (2016)
- Blake's 7: Liberation an audio drama by Big Finish Productions (2017)
- Blake's 7: Paradise Lost an audio drama by Big Finish Productions (2017)
