= The Book of the Still =

2002 novel by Paul Ebbs

- Author: Paul Ebbs
- Series: Doctor Who book: Eighth Doctor Adventures
- Release number: 56
- Subject: Featuring: Eighth Doctor; Fitz and Anji
- Publisher: BBC Books
- Publication date: May 2002
- Pages: 224
- ISBN: 0-563-53851-1
- Preceded by: Trading Futures
- Followed by: The Crooked World

The Book of the Still is a BBC Books original novel written by Paul Ebbs and based on the long-running British science fiction television series Doctor Who. It features the Eighth Doctor, Fitz and Anji.
