= The Final Sanction =

The Final Sanction may refer to:

- The Final Sanction (novel), a 1999 novel
- The Final Sanction (film), a 1990 film
