= Peter Guinness (actor) =

English actor (born 1950)

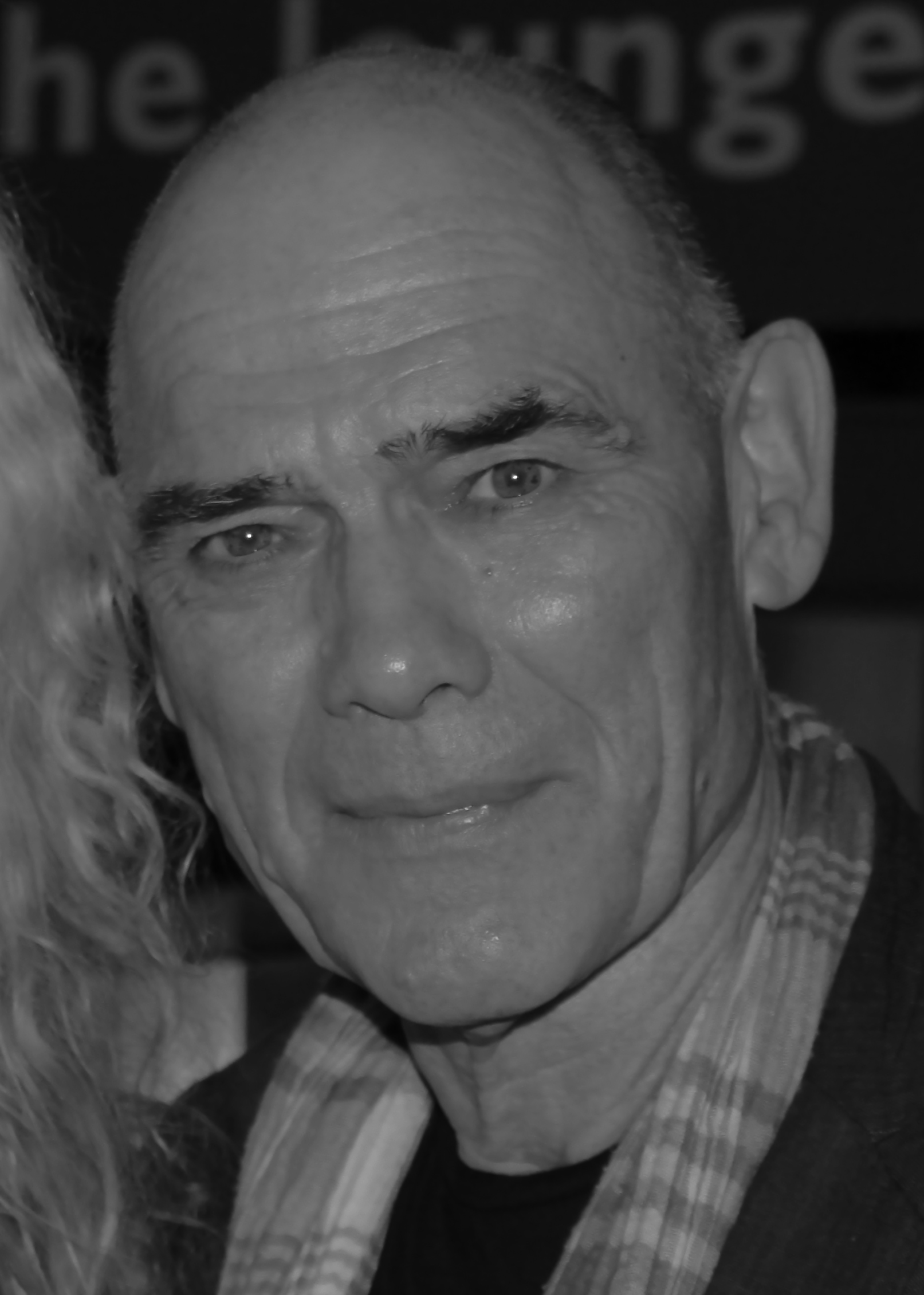
- Guinness in 2015
- Born: 3 May 1950 (age 76); Whitstable, Kent, England
- Occupation: Actor
- Years active: 1979–present
- Spouse: Roberta Taylor (m. 1996; died 2024)

Peter Guinness (born 3 May 1950) is an English film, television, and theatre actor.

== Career ==
He has appeared in over fifty television productions and more than ten films. Guinness has also appeared onstage in an adaptation of The Pianist.

== Personal life ==
He was married to Roberta Taylor, who was an actress and writer, until her death in July 2024.

== Filmography ==
=== Film ===
Year	Title	Role	Notes
1983	The Keep	Wehrmacht Soldier	
1992	Christopher Columbus: The Discovery	Fra Perez	
1992	Alien 3	Gregor	
1997	The Saint	Frankie's curator	
1999	Sleepy Hollow	Lord Crane	
2006	Terry Pratchett's Hogfather	Medium Dave Cropper	
2010	Centurion	General Cassius	
2017	King Arthur: Legend of the Sword	Baron 1	
2019	Official Secrets	TinTin / Scotland Yard	
2021	Zack Snyder's Justice League	DeSaad	Voice and motion capture
2023	The Boys in the Boat	George Yeomans Pocock	

=== Television ===
Year	Title	Role	Notes
1982	Smiley's People	Hari Krishna Monk	Episode 1.02
1983–1985	By the Sword Divided	Dick Skinner	Mini-series
1989–2007	The Bill	Multiple characters	10 episodes
1991	The Case-Book of Sherlock Holmes	Jenkins	"The Creeping Man" (Episode 1.06)
1992	Zorro	Bandit Leader	"An Affair to Remember" (Episode 4.05)
1992	The Cloning of Joanna May	Phillip	Mini-series
1992–1993	Spender	DCS Gillespie	Main role
1993	Highlander: The Series	Col. Everett Bellian	"Nowhere To Run" (Episode 1.21)
1993	Heartbeat	Stevie Walsh	"Riders of the Storm" (Episode 3.02)
1994	Smokescreen	Albert Gold	Main role
1994–1998	Casualty	Elliot Matthews / Paul Becket	Recurring role
1996	Tales from the Crypt	Mr. Starr	"Horror In The Night" (Episode 7.05)
1997	Cadfael	Father Ailnoth	"The Raven in the Foregate" (Episode 3.03)
1997	Ivanhoe	Montfitchet	Parts 3–6
2000	Arabian Nights	Chief Executioner	Mini-series
2000–2002	Coronation Street	Ray Sykes	5 episodes
2001	Harbour Lights	Vinnie	"The Safe Side" (Episode 2.04)
2001	Lexx	Van Helsing	Episodes 4.7, 4.8
2003–2004	Red Cap	Capt. Gavin Howard	Main role
2004	Medici: Godfathers of the Renaissance	Giovanni di Becci de' Medici & Galileo	Episodes 1, 4
2005	Bleak House	Coroner	Episodes 1.2, 1.7
2006	Rudyard Kipling: A Remembrance Tale	Rudyard Kipling	Documentary
2006	Hogfather	Medium Dave	TV movie
2007	Seconds From Disaster	Narrator	Series 3
2008	Silent Witness	Powell	"The Lost Child" Parts 1 & 2
2009	Doctor Who	Mister Dread (voice)	Serial: Dreamland
2010	Ashes to Ashes	Terry Stafford	Episode 3.4
2011	Zen	Tito Spadola	Episode: "Vendetta"
2011	Hidden	Jason Styles	4 episodes
2012	Merlin	Ari	"The Diamond of the Day Part 1" (Episode 5.12)
2013	Jo	Sabot	Episode: "Place de la Concorde"
2013	The Bible	King Nebuchadnezzar	Episode: "Survival"
2013	Da Vinci's Demons	Friar Tomás de Torquemada	Episode: "The Tower"
2013	Strike Back	Pushkin	Episode 4.07
2014	The Assets	Dmitry Polyakov	2 episodes
2015	Critical	Mr. Devlin	Episode 1.4
2016	Stan Lee's Lucky Man	Vincent Lermentov	Episode: "More Yang Than Yin"
2018	Watership Down	Silverweed (voice)	4 episodes
2019	Chernobyl	Major Burov	Episode: "Please Remain Calm"
2019	Catch-22	General Dreedle	Episode 1.6
2019	Pennyworth	General Malcolm	3 episodes
2020	Cursed	Sir Ector	3 episodes
2021	The Girlfriend Experience	Lief	4 episodes
2022	Jack Ryan	Petr Kovac	Main role
2024	Red Eye	Sir George Chapman	2 episodes

=== Audio-dramas ===
Year	Title	Role	Notes
2000	Doctor Who: The Holy Terror	Childeric	
2004	Judge Dredd: Grud is Dead	Devlin Waugh	
2008	The Phantom of the Opera	The Phantom	
2008	Blake's 7: Point of No Return	Carl Varon	
2009	Doctor Who: The Beast of Orlok	Baron Teufel	
2010	Dracula's Guest & Other Dark Tales	Narrator	
2015	Alien	Narrator	Audiobook: The Official Movie Novelization
2016–2017	Strangeness in Space	Dr Scarifium	Episodes 2 and 6: "The Five" and "Dark Meta"
2017	Doctor Who: The Star Men	Rovus	

=== Other ===
Year	Title	Role	Notes
1997	Freaks	Bar Patron	Music video

== Stage ==
- Alberto Sholez in Moby Dick. World premiere adapted and directed by Michael Elliott at the Royal Exchange, Manchester. (1984)
- Jaques in As You Like It. Directed by Marianne Elliott at the Royal Exchange, Manchester. (2000)
- Stage adaptation of The Pianist, (2007), Manchester International Festival
- Thomas Danforth in The Crucible by Arthur Miller. Directed by Caroline Steinbeis at the Royal Exchange, Manchester. (2015)
