= Anachrophobia =

2002 novel by Jonathan Morris

- Author: Jonathan Morris
- Series: Doctor Who book: Eighth Doctor Adventures
- Release number: 54
- Subject: Featuring: Eighth Doctor; Fitz, Anji
- Publisher: BBC Books
- Publication date: 4 March 2002
- ISBN: 0-563-53847-3
- Preceded by: Hope
- Followed by: Trading Futures

Anachrophobia is a BBC Books original novel written by Jonathan Morris and based on the long-running British science fiction television series Doctor Who. It features the Eighth Doctor, Fitz and Anji.

== Plot ==
Whilst travelling in time, the TARDIS suddenly shakes violently. The Eighth Doctor shuts it down, concluding that it is tearing itself apart attempting to escape a force that is forcing it to land. As the Doctor, Anji and Fitz emerge onto a wasteland, they are captured by soldiers. They learn that they have landed on a planet that is host to a war between two factions of humans: the Plutocratic empire and rebels known as Defaulters. Both sides have weapons that can slow the flow of time, or speed it up in small areas, but because of this, both sides have reached a stalemate.

The soldiers take the Doctor to an officer called Lane. She assumes that the Doctor is the time expert the Plutocrats were sending, and the Doctor decides to agree. Lane takes them to a military outpost called Station 40. When they arrive, one of the soldiers, a man called Bishop, who had his arm aged by a time storm, is placed in a decelerated time capsule until his fate is decided.

The commander of the base, Commander Bragg, reveals that one of his scientists, Dr Patterson, has developed a time capsule, which they plan to use to stop the war from ever happening. Two men, Ash and Norton, get inside the machine and go back in time, but the machine spins out of control. The Doctor brings the machine back to the present, and Ash and Norton are placed in quarantine and develop disorientation, anachrophobia, memory loss and physical trauma.

The Doctor finds a breach in the machine's walls, meaning that the machine's interior was exposed to the time vortex. Meanwhile, Norton's condition is getting worse: time is moving more slowly around him and he cannot recognise his own face as his past is slowly being erased. The Doctor decides to travel in the time capsule and Fitz demands to go with him, but Bragg learns that the Doctor is not the time expert and stops Anji from carrying on with controlling the capsule. Meanwhile, inside the capsule, time slows down and something begins banging on the door.

Lane goes to check Ash and Norton, but they attack her and in her rush to leave she tears her time proof suit. Time then jumps back one minute, and lane contacts Bragg, giving Anji the chance to overpower him and return The Doctor and Fitz to the present. However another staff member, Shaw, overpowers Anji and locks the Doctor and his companions away. Time begins to flow more slowly over Lane and time jumps back a minute, confirming that Ash and Norton infected lane, who has now infected Bragg.

A man called Mistletoe arrives at the station, claiming to be an auditor sent to review the experiments. Shaw releases the Doctor, Fitz and Anji and brings them to the lab as Mistletoe moves Bishop to the quarantine ward. Bishop becomes infected and Ash, Norton and Bishop face's all turn into clock faces. The Doctor uses gas to knock out the infected and after examining them, reveals that they are turning into clocks.

Elsewhere, Patterson sees Bragg's face turn into a clock, but when he reaches the Doctor to warn him, his face turns into a clock, and he finds that he can travel throughout his own lifetime. The Doctor warns him not to, as he fears that the infected are offered the chance to change their personal timelines, but if they do, they have their history erased and become empty vessels for the clock creatures to take over. After hearing this, Patterson commits suicide.

Fitz and Shaw go looking for the others, but as they do, a Defaulter bombing causes safety doors to lower. Shaw takes Fitz down to the lower levels, leaving The Doctor and Anji trapped with Bragg. The Doctor opens the door and seals it again, but Bragg rewinds time to get through.

The Doctor and Anji seal themselves in the control room with Mistletoe, but it is too late for the clock creatures to rewind time. Fitz and Shaw are attacked by Lane, but due to her time reversal abilities, he cannot shoot her. Lane releases Ash, Bishop and Norton from the quarantine ward as Doctor, Anji and Mistletoe flee to the medical bay. the Doctor exams battle reports and finds them full of strange tactics. Mistletoe then admits that the war is being prolonged to increase profit for the empire.

The Doctor then decides to use mustard gas on the creatures as it takes an hour to take effect and the clocks will not be able to rewind time far enough to save themselves. Fitz and Shaw retrieve Mustard gas from the stores and release it. Anji cannot find the Doctor, until Fitz brings him back into the medical bay, having found him outside with no gas mask on. The infected people slowly die, but Mistletoe remembers that Bishop was taken to Station One, the main headquarters of the Plutocrats, to study his infection. The station has a population of 60,000, all of whom will be infected.

The survivors sent out in a van in pursuit of Dr. Hammond, only to find his van ambushed by Defaulters, but the whole area has been frozen in time due to Bishop's capsule being smashed. Dr. Hammond reveals himself to be a robot while Shaw reveals that he is a Defaulter agent. As Shaw prepares to shoot everyone, an accelerated time bomb brings time back to normal, and a Defaulter soldier shoots Shaw and injures Bishop. Hammond's power supply explodes, which kills the Defaulter. Bishop uses his powers to rewind time, kill the defaulter and flee from Hammond. however, his face turns into a clock. Plutocratic soldiers mistakenly rescue Bishop, but as the Doctor pursues them, they go through a small patch of decelerated time with broken shielding and arrive at station One months later.

They find that all of station One has been converted, but they are allowed to pass through unharmed. At the central audit bureau, they meet the Actuaries, robot accountants who have been running both sides of the war for profit. However, they cannot remember why they are making money or who for, as they have not received any contact from the Empire for one hundred years. They funded the time travel experiments to try to find their purpose. However Bishop enters and infects the Doctor.

As the clocks try to tempt him, he remembers that as the clocks exist outside of normal time, they depend on the hole in time that the capsule tore. The Doctor travels along his own timeline to the point where he sealed the airlock before the mustard gas was released. He runs to the lab and fills the time capsule with chrononium, the material used to make the time weapons, then he sets up a clockwork timer. After exposing himself to the gas, he returns to the present, without having changed history. The capsule then launches, sealing the hole. the clocks are killed, and the Doctor passes out.

Mistletoe reveals himself as Sabbath (he is not named in the text, but it is clearly him from the description) to Fitz and Anji. Sabbath explains that the clocks were not invading the universe but fleeing Sabbath's allies in the time vortex, and that both the clocks and the Doctor were manipulated into coming here, in the hope that the Doctor would destroy them. Sabbath then leaves, and Fitz and Anji carry the Doctor to the TARDIS.

== Continuity ==
- The front cover is based on René Magritte's famous self-portrait, The Son of Man. In the original, an apple obscures the face.
- According to fellow series author Jon Blum, Morris has said that the clock-faced men in the story are meant to be Faction Paradox, although this is not made explicit in the text.
- The Wraiths in the novel The Slow Empire were also said to be fleeing Sabbath's allies. Who his allies are is revealed in the novel Sometime Never...
- Mistletoe's arrival was one of the glimpses of the future from Father Time, making Father Time Sabbath's (unnamed) first appearance in the novels.
- Romana was drawn with a clock as her face in the serial City of Death.
