= Salvation (novel) =

1999 novel by Steve Lyons

- Author: Steve Lyons
- Series: Doctor Who book: Past Doctor Adventures
- Release number: 18
- Subject: Featuring: First Doctor; Dodo, Steven
- Set in: Period between The Massacre of St Bartholomew's Eve and The Ark
- Publisher: BBC Books
- Publication date: 4 January 1999
- Pages: 274
- ISBN: 0-563-55566-1
- Preceded by: The Infinity Doctors
- Followed by: The Wages of Sin

Salvation is a BBC Books original novel written by Steve Lyons and based on the long-running British science fiction television series Doctor Who. It features the First Doctor, Dodo, and Steven.

== Key points ==
The novel expands and elaborates on the circumstances under which Dodo first begins to travel with the Doctor. The "gods" of this story are created in the same way as the inhabitants of The Crooked World, another Doctor Who novel by Steve Lyons. Reference is made to a film called Pray for a Miracle filmed a couple of years after the events in the novel based on the campaign to defeat the Gods, with the role of the Doctor being played by Peter Cushing.
