= The Phantom of the Opera (audio drama) =

2007 UK Doctor Who audio drama

Big Finish Productions audio drama
- Series: Big Finish Classics
- Release no.: 1
- Written by: Adapted by Barnaby Edwards
- Directed by: Barnaby Edwards
- Executive producer(s): Nicholas Briggs; Jason Haigh-Ellery
- Release date: December 2007

The Phantom of the Opera, an adaptation of the novel of the same title by Gaston Leroux, is an audio drama created by Big Finish Productions for BBC Radio 7, broadcast in December 2007.

The story was written and directed by Barnaby Edwards in four half-hour episodes. The four-part dramatization is the first to feature the original operatic sequences described in the novel, which have been freshly recorded and orchestrated by composer Tim Sutton. The play features Anna Massey, Peter Guinness, Alexander Siddig and James D’Arcy.

Barnaby Edwards announced in June 2009 the production would be relaunched, as part of a new Big Finish Classics series of literary adaptations planned for 2010–2012.

== Cast and crew ==
- The Phantom................ Peter Guinness
- Christine Daaé.............. Helen Goldwyn
- Raoul de Chagny.......... James D'Arcy
- Mme Giry..................... Anna Massey
- The Persian.................. Alexander Siddig
- Philippe de Chagny........ Nick Brimble
- Moncharmin.................. Tony Millan
- Richard......................... Richard Earl
- Lachenel/Mifroid............ Nick Wilton
- Mme Valérius................ Geraldine Newman
- La Carlotta................... Samantha Hughes
- Meg Giry...................... Nicola Weeks

Opera sequences sung by Linda Richardson and Matthew Hargreaves.

Music by Tim Sutton

Violin by Ruth Rogers

Sound design by Thea Cochrane

CD & booklet design by Alex Mallinson

Written, directed and produced by Barnaby Edwards

Duration: Two hours

== Recording ==
The story was recorded on 24 and 25 September, and 4 and 12 October 2007, and released on CD in March 2008.
