= Ken Bentley =

British theatre director

Kenneth Bentley is a British drama director who works primarily in audio and theatre. He is best known for his work with Big Finish Productions, including their long-running series of audio dramas based on the popular British science-fiction series Doctor Who.

Bentley attended Berkshire College of Art and trained as a director at Drama Studio London.

In addition to his directing work Bentley was an assistant music researcher on Stephen Poliakoff's Capturing Mary, and his written work includes Atramuntanat (a play about the life of Salvador Dalí) as well as a short story and several co-written short films.

== Theatre ==
- Phedre (Temp Contre Temps, Purcell Room)
- Flowers of the Dead Red Sea (Recidivist TC, Philosophy Society)
- Oleanna (Firebrand, The White Bear)
- The Speckled Band (Drayton Court Theatre)
- Atramuntanat (Motiv, Edinburgh Festival)
- The Diary of One Who Vanished (Sound Lyrical, Purcell Room)
- Arianna A Naxos (Temp Contre Temps, Purcell Room)
- The Bedsit (Wide, Chicago, USA)
- Dark is the Night (Gilded Balloon, Edinburgh Festival)
- Anna Weiss (Go Girl, Jermyn Street Theatre)
- The Damage (Gilded Balloon, Edinburgh Festival)
- The Simple Truth (Firebrand, rehearsed reading)

== Audio drama ==
=== As director ===
- Doctor Who: The Death Collectors & Spider's Shadow (June 2008)
- Doctor Who: Kingdom of Silver & Keepsake with Nicholas Briggs (September 2008)
- Doctor Who: Forty-Five (November 2008)
- Doctor Who: The Magic Mousetrap (April 2009)
- Doctor Who: Enemy of the Daleks (May 2009)
- Doctor Who: The Angel of Scutari (June 2009)
- Doctor Who: Project: Destiny (September 2010)
- Doctor Who: A Death in the Family (October 2010)
- Doctor Who: Lurkers at Sunlight's Edge (November 2010)
- Doctor Who: The Demons of Red Lodge and Other Stories (December 2010)
- Doctor Who: Heroes of Sontar (April 2011)
- Doctor Who: Kiss of Death (May 2011)
- Doctor Who: Rat Trap (June 2011)
- Doctor Who: Recorded Time and Other Stories (August 2011)
- Doctor Who: The Doomsday Quatrain (September 2011)
- Doctor Who: House of Blue Fire (September 2011)
- Doctor Who: The Jupiter Conjunction (May 2012)
- Doctor Who: The Butcher of Brisbane (June 2012)
- Doctor Who: Protect and Survive (July 2012)
- Doctor Who: Black and White (August 2012)
- Doctor Who: Gods and Monsters (September 2012)
- Doctor Who: The Burning Prince (September 2012)
- Doctor Who: The Acheron Pulse (October 2012)
- Doctor Who: The Shadow Heart (November 2012)
- Doctor Who: Eldrad Must Die! (April 2013)
- Doctor Who: The Lady of Mercia (May 2013)
- Doctor Who: Prisoners of Fate (June 2013)
- Doctor Who: Persuasion (July 2013)
- Doctor Who: Starlight Robbery (August 2013)
- Doctor Who: Daleks Among Us (September 2013)
- Doctor Who: 1963: The Assassination Games (November 2013)
- Doctor Who: Afterlife (December 2013)
- Doctor Who: Moonflesh (April 2014)
- Doctor Who: Tomb Ship (May 2014)
- Doctor Who: Masquerade (June 2014)
- Doctor Who: Revenge of the Swarm (August 2014)
- Doctor Who: Mask of Tragedy (September 2014)
- Doctor Who: Signs and Wonders (September 2014)
- Doctor Who: The Widow's Assassin (October 2014)
- Doctor Who: Dark Eyes 3 (November 2014)
- Doctor Who: The Rani Elite (December 2014)
- Doctor Who: Mistfall (January 2015)
- Doctor Who: Equilibrium (February 2015)
- Doctor Who: The Entropy Plague (March 2015)
- Doctor Who: Last of the Cybermen (May 2015)
- Doctor Who: We Are The Daleks (July 2015)
- Doctor Who: Terror of the Sontarans (September 2015)
- Doctor Who: Criss-Cross (September 2015)
- Doctor Who: Planet of the Rani (October 2015)
- Doctor Who: Doom Coalition 1 (November 2015)
- Doctor Who: You Are the Doctor and Other Stories (December 2015)
- Doctor Who: Aquitaine (February 2016)
- Doctor Who: Dark Eyes 4 (March 2015)
- Doctor Who: Doom Coalition 2 (May 2016)
- Doctor Who: A Life of Crime (July 2016)
- Doctor Who: Fiesta of the Damned (August 2016)
- Doctor Who: Maker of Demons (September 2016)
- Doctor Who: Doom Coalition 3 (October 2016)
- Doctor Who: Alien Heart / Dalek Soul (April 2017)
- Doctor Who: Philip Hinchcliffe Presents Volume 03: The Helm of Awe (April 2017)
- Doctor Who: Doom Coalition 4 (May 2017)
- Doctor Who: Vortex Ice / Cortex Fire (May 2017)
