= Trading Futures =

2002 novel by Lance Parkin

- Author: Lance Parkin
- Series: Doctor Who book: Eighth Doctor Adventures
- Release number: 55
- Subject: Featuring: Eighth Doctor; Fitz and Anji
- Publisher: BBC Books
- Publication date: April 2002
- Pages: 247
- ISBN: 0-563-53848-1
- Preceded by: Anachrophobia
- Followed by: The Book of the Still

Trading Futures is a BBC Books original novel written by Lance Parkin and based on the long-running British science fiction television series Doctor Who. It features the Eighth Doctor, Fitz and Anji. This book, along with a few others in the series, was reprinted in 2011 and is available to purchase as an e-book.

== Writing and development ==
The cover and elements of the story are spoofs of the James Bond franchise. The novel features a Bond-like character named Jonah Cosgrove, described by the author thus: "Cosgrove is (and I mean 'is' here in the very precise, non-trademark violating, sense of the word) the Sean Connery Bond, but one who never retired and who's been a secret agent for fifty years. So he's about eighty, and all the time he's just been piling on more muscles and getting more wrinkled, and ever more set in his ways and bitter and anachronistic. He's Sean Connery in The Rock, as drawn by Frank Miller, and by now he's been promoted to M."
