= Jonathan Morris (author) =

British writer

- Born: Taunton, England
- Occupations: Novelist, scriptwriter
- Writing career
- Genre: Fiction
- Website: underthreehundred.blogspot.com

Jonathan Morris (born in Taunton, England), is an author who writes various kinds of Doctor Who spin-off material. In 2023, he stood for election to Winchester City Council as the Liberal Democrats candidate for the St Barnabas Ward and won with 56% of the vote.

== Career ==
=== Writing ===
His path to prominence in writing professional Doctor Who fiction was notable in part because he was commissioned to write a novel after only his first attempt under the BBC's "Open Submission" policy.

He has written for the Eighth Doctor Adventures and Past Doctor Adventures. He has also written for Big Finish Productions' range of audio and printed material. Among his Doctor Who literary credits are short stories in the Big Finish Short Trips anthologies; the novels Festival of Death, Anachrophobia, and The Tomorrow Windows; and the audio adventures Bloodtide, Flip-Flop, Max Warp, The Haunting of Thomas Brewster, A Perfect World, Mary's Story, Hothouse, The Cannibalists, The Eternal Summer, Protect and Survive and 1963: The Space Race. Festival of Death received 2000's "Best Past Doctor Novel" award from the readers of Doctor Who Magazine. Morris contributed "The Clanging Chimes of Doom" to Short Trips: A Christmas Treasury, "Lant Land" to Short Trips: Life Science, "The Thief of Sherwood" to Short Trips: Past Tense, and "Mauritz" to Short Trips: A Universe of Terrors. His debut novel, Festival of Death, was placed seventh in the Top 10 of SFX magazine's "Best SF/Fantasy novelisation or TV tie-in novel" category of 2000.

In 2005, he wrote the narration script for the documentary "Paris in the Springtime", a homage to Douglas Adams' work on Doctor Who, which was included in the BBC DVD release of the serial City of Death.

In addition to his Doctor Who work, he has also written for Big Finish's Judge Dredd range, contributing the title, I Love Judge Dredd. For the Bernice Summerfield series of anthologies he has contributed the short stories "The Spartacus Syndrome" (in A Life of Surprises) and "The Traitors" (in Life During Wartime). In 2011, he contributed to their Dark Shadows range with The Blind Painter and Operation Victor.

In 2005, some of his writing was included in the televised British sketch/situation comedy fusion, Swinging.

== Bibliography ==
=== Novels ===
- Festival of Death (2000)
- Anachrophobia (Doctor Who) (2002)
- The Tomorrow Windows (Doctor Who) (2004)
- Touched by an Angel (2011)
- Plague City (2017)

=== Factual books ===
- The Monster Vault (2020)
- Whotopia: The Ultimate Guide (2023)

=== Short stories ===
- Mauritz
- The Thief of Sherwood
- Lantland
- The Clanging Chimes of Doom
- Bernice Summerfield: The Traitors
- Bernice Summerfield: The Spartacus Syndrome

=== Audio Productions ===
==== Average Romp ====
- When Michael met Benny (2022)
- The Chimes (2022)

==== Big Finish: Doctor Who ====
- Bloodtide (2001)
- Flip-Flop (2003)
- The Haunting of Thomas Brewster (2008)
- A Perfect World (2008)
- Mary's Story (2009)
- The Eternal Summer (2009)
- Cobwebs (2010)
- The Crimes of Thomas Brewster (2011)
- The Curse of Davros (2012)
- Protect and Survive (2012)
- The Shadow Heart (2012)
- Prisoners of Fate (2013)
- 1963: The Space Race (2013)
- Revenge of the Swarm (2014)
- The Entropy Plague (2015)
- We Are the Daleks (2015)
- The Waters of Amsterdam (2016)
- Vortex Ice (2017)
- Static (2017)
- The Kamelion Empire (2019)
- Lightspeed (2020)

==== Big Finish: Companion Chronicles ====
- The Beautiful People (2007)
- The Great Space Elevator (2008)
- The Glorious Revolution (2009)
- The Mists of Time (2009)
- Tales from the Vault (2011)
- Mastermind (2013)
- Ghost in the Machine (2013)

==== Big Finish: Eighth Doctor Adventures ====
- Max Warp (2008)
- Hothouse (2009)
- The Cannibalists (2009)
- Deimos (2010)
- The Resurrection of Mars (2010)

==== Big Finish: Fourth Doctor Adventures ====
- The Auntie Matter (2013)
- Phantoms of the Deep (2013)
- Last of the Colophon (2014)
- The Cloisters of Terror (2015)
- The Paradox Planet (2016)
- Legacy of Death (2016)
- Subterranea (2017)
- Chase the Night (2020)
- The Day of the Comet (2021)

==== Big Finish: Jago & Litefoot ====
- The Spirit Trap (2010)
- The Theatre of Dreams (2011)
- The Age of Revolution (2013)
- The Skeleton Quay (2013)
- The Monstrous Menagerie (2014)
- The Flying Frenchmen (2015)
- The Year of the Bat (2015)

==== Big Finish: The Lost Stories ====
- The Valley of Death (2011; story by Philip Hinchcliffe)
- The Guardians of Prophecy (2012; story by Johnny Byrne)
- Doctor Who and The Ark (2023; story by John Lucarotti)

==== Other Doctor Who Big Finish stories ====
- Voyage to Venus (2012)
- Psychodrome (2014)
- The Screaming Skull (2014)
- Damaged Goods (2016; story by Russell T Davies)
- The Lords of Terror (2018)
- The Crash of the UK-201 (2018)
- The Avenues of Possibility (2019)
- Ghosts (2020)
- Genetics of the Daleks (2020)
- Saviour (2021)
- Maelstrom (2022)
- Reverse Engineering (2022)
- Emancipation of the Daleks (2022)
- A Genius For War (2023)
- Fugitive of the Daleks (2024)
- Invasion of the Body-Stealers (2024)

==== Big Finish: Vienna ====
- The Memory Box (2013)
- Death World (2013)
- The Vienna Experience (2015)

==== Big Finish: Torchwood ====
- Instant Karma (2018; with David Llewellyn and James Goss)

==== Big Finish: The Diary of River Song ====
- The Bekdel Test (2019)
- Queen of the Mechonoids (2021)

==== Big Finish: Missy ====
- The Belly of the Beast (2019)

==== Big Finish: UNIT ====
- This Sleep of Death (2019)

==== Big Finish: The Paternoster Gang ====
- The Cars That Ate London! (2019)

==== Big Finish: Rose Tyler ====
- The Endless Night (2019)

==== Big Finish: Blake's 7 ====
- Sedition (2022)

==== Big Finish: 2000 AD ====
- I Love Judge Dredd (2002)

==== Big Finish: Dark Shadows ====
- The Blind Painter (2011)
- Operation Victor (2012)

==== Big Finish: Survivors ====
- Exodus (2014)
- Cabin Fever (2015)

==== BBC Audio: Destiny Of The Doctor ====
- Babblesphere (2013)

==== BBC Audio: Doctor Who ====
- The Nightmare Realm (2021)
