= Doctor Who: The Eighth Doctor Adventures =

Audio plays featuring the Eighth Doctor

The Eighth Doctor Adventures

Big Finish Productions audio drama
- Series: Doctor Who
- Featuring: Eighth Doctor
- Executive producers: Nicholas Briggs; Jason Haigh-Ellery
- Release date: November 2003 (retroactively); November 2007 (actual)

The Eighth Doctor Adventures is a Big Finish Productions audio play series based on the British science fiction television programme Doctor Who. It sees the return of Paul McGann reprising his role as the Eighth Doctor from the 1996 television movie.

== History ==
In 2001, Paul McGann became involved with Big Finish Productions producing adventures as the Eighth Doctor, a role he originated in the 1996 TV movie Doctor Who, as part of their ongoing Main Range. However, in 2007, due to the popularity of several of these titles on BBC Radio 7 (now known as BBC Radio 4 Extra), the BBC partnered with Big Finish to produce a series called The Eighth Doctor Adventures for BBC Radio 7 beginning with Blood of the Daleks, co-starring Sheridan Smith as the Doctor's latest companion Lucie Miller and featuring a guest appearance from a then fairly unknown Hayley Atwell. This range would go on for a further three seasons of stories, with Lucie initially departing in the 2009 Christmas special Death in Blackpool. The fourth season brought in Niky Wardley as the Doctor's new companion Tamsin Drew and reintroduced Carole Ann Ford as the Doctor's granddaughter Susan Foreman from the original television series, with Sheridan returning as Lucie later in the season. The range concluded in 2011 with the fourth season finale To the Death, which saw the deaths of both Lucie and Tamsin in a grim ending for the Doctor.

After the original end of The Eighth Doctor Adventures, November 2012 saw the return of the Eighth Doctor in a new boxset entitled Dark Eyes starring McGann alongside Ruth Bradley as new companion Molly O'Sullivan. The box set was a commercial success and won the BBC Audio Drama award for Best Online or Non-Broadcast Drama. This led to the commission of three further box sets continuing the Dark Eyes saga starting in 2014, which starred McGann and Bradley and introduced a second companion in Liv Chenka, played by BAFTA TV Award nominated actress Nicola Walker. Due to Bradley's limited availability, Molly was written out at the end of the third volume, though the character returned once more in the fourth volume played by Sorcha Cusack.

Following the success of Dark Eyes, the multi-volume boxset format was used extensively, starting with the four-part saga Doom Coalition from 2015 to 2017. McGann and Walker reprised their roles as the Eighth Doctor and Liv Chenka respectively, and were joined by new companion Helen Sinclair, portrayed by Hattie Morahan. It also featured the return of Alex Kingston as River Song in a recurring capacity, marking the first time elements from the revived iteration of the parent series Doctor Who appeared. Doom Coalition was followed by two more four-part sagas starring McGann, Walker, and Morahan as the Doctor, Liv, and Helen, which were entitled Ravenous (2018–2019) and Stranded (2020–2022). The end of Stranded depicted Liv's departure from the TARDIS, though it left a narrative gap for more adventures with the trio in the future.

Alongside the box sets with Liv and Helen, in 2017 Big Finish Productions began a new strand of stories set much later in the Eighth Doctor's life at the onset of the Time War. The Eighth Doctor: The Time War, as it was called, served as a prequel to The War Doctor and drew from the depiction of the Eighth Doctor in the 2013 minisode "The Night of the Doctor", which had marked McGann's first reprisal of the role on television since 1996 and also mentioned audio companions Charley, Lucie, Tamsin, and Molly on screen for the first time. The series starred McGann alongside Rakhee Thakrar as his companion Bliss, and ran for four volumes through 2020. Additionally, two one-off box sets were released which featured the return of Sheridan Smith as Lucie Miller in 2019 and India Fisher as Charlotte Pollard in 2022 and were each set during their original runs.

In May 2020, Big Finish announced the Main Range would conclude in March 2021 and subsequently replaced with regular releases of each Doctor's adventures continuing in their own respective ranges. A previously released special title from 2003 and all the boxset series with the Eighth Doctor were united under the umbrella banner of The Eighth Doctor Adventures as part of this change. Two new standalone boxsets What Lies Inside? and Connections were announced for release in 2022, which featured the returns of McGann, Walker, and Morahan as the Doctor, Liv, and Helen.

== Cast and characters ==
List indicator

This section includes characters who will appear or have appeared in at least one season.

- A green cell indicates the actor is a main cast member.
- A red cell indicates the actor is a recurring cast member.
- A light blue cell indicates the actor is a guest or special guest cast member.

Actor	Character	Appearances																													
Actor	Character	Eighth Doctor Adv.						Dark Eyes				Doom Coalition				Time War								Ravenous				Stranded			
Actor	Character	Sp.	1	2	3	4	Sp.	1	2	3	4	1	2	3	4	1	2	3	4	5	6	7	8	1	2	3	4	1	2	3	4
Paul McGann	The Doctor	✓	✓	✓	✓	✓	✓	✓	✓	✓	✓	✓	✓	✓	✓	✓	✓	✓	✓	✓	✓	✓	✓	✓	✓	✓	✓	✓	✓	✓	✓
India Fisher	Charley Pollard	✓																								✓					
Sheridan Smith	Lucie Miller		✓	✓	✓	✓																									
Carole Ann Ford	Susan Foreman					✓	✓																✓								
Sonny McGann (Note: Credited as Jake McGann prior to 2023)	Alex Campbell					✓	✓													✓	✓	✓	✓								
Niky Wardley	Tamsin Drew					✓																									
Ruth Bradley	Molly O'Sullivan							✓	✓	✓																					
Sorcha Cusack	Molly O'Sullivan										✓																				
Nicola Walker	Liv Chenka								✓	✓	✓	✓	✓	✓	✓									✓	✓	✓	✓	✓	✓	✓	✓
Hattie Morahan	Helen Sinclair											✓	✓	✓	✓						✓			✓	✓	✓	✓	✓	✓	✓	✓
Mark Bonnar	The Eleven											✓	✓		✓									✓	✓	✓	✓				
Alex Kingston	River Song												✓	✓	✓											✓					
Rakhee Thakrar	Bliss															✓	✓	✓	✓							✓					
Emma Campbell-Jones	Cass Fermazzi																			✓	✓	✓	✓								
Rebecca Root	Tania Bell																											✓	✓	✓	✓
Tom Price	Andy Davidson																											✓	✓	✓	✓
Katarina Olsson	The Headhunter		✓	✓	✓																										
Nicholas Briggs	Daleks		✓			✓		✓	✓		✓					✓	✓	✓	✓	✓			✓								
Nicholas Briggs	Cybermen		✓																												
Nicholas Briggs	Ice Warriors					✓																									
Nicholas Briggs	Judoon																													✓	
Graeme Garden	The Monk					✓																									
Rufus Hound	The Monk														✓																
Alex MacQueen	The Master								✓	✓	✓																				
Geoffrey Beevers	The Master																										✓				
Eric Roberts	The Master																										✓				
Derek Jacobi	The Master																										✓				
Michelle Gomez	The Master																										✓				
David Sibley	The Eminence								✓	✓	✓																				
Julia McKenzie	The Twelve																✓		✓												
Joel James Davison	Robin Bright-Thompson																											✓	✓	✓	✓
Clive Wood	Mr. Bird																											✓			✓
Tom Baker	The Curator																											✓	✓		
Colin Baker	The Curator																														✓

Actor	Character	Appearances											
Actor	Character	Other			Boxsets								
Actor	Character	LM	CP	SoL	WLI	CON	AUD	IBM	ECH	DS	CW	EV	NP
Paul McGann	The Doctor	✓	✓	✓	✓	✓	✓	✓	✓	✓	✓	✓	✓
India Fisher	Charley Pollard		✓	✓			✓	✓		✓	✓		
Sheridan Smith	Lucie Miller	✓											
Nicola Walker	Liv Chenka				✓	✓			✓			✓	
Hattie Morahan	Helen Sinclair				✓	✓			✓			✓	
Jaye Griffiths	Lady Audacity Montague						✓	✓		✓	✓		
Natalie Gumede	Chase Moyo												✓
Sam Stafford	Alfie Steep												✓
Nicholas Briggs	Daleks	✓		✓	✓								
Nicholas Briggs	Cybermen						✓						
Alex MacQueen	The Master			✓									

=== Notable guests ===
- Seán Carlsen as Narvin
- Sylvester McCoy as The Doctor
- Tim McMullan as The Eight
- Michael Jayston as The Valeyard
- Terry Molloy as Davros
- Ken Bones as The General
- Ian McNeice as Winston Churchill
- Jon Culshaw as Brigadier Lethbridge-Stewart
- Michelle Livingston as Deeva Jansen
- Shane Richie as Drax
- Conrad Westmaas as C'rizz

== Episodes ==
=== Main series ===
==== The Eighth Doctor Adventures (2003–2011) ====
===== Special (2003) =====
Originally released as a CD extra for Doctor Who Magazine, but was retroactively added as a part of the range.

No.	Title	Directed by	Written by	Featuring	Released
–	"Living Legend"	Gary Russell	Scott Gray	Eighth Doctor, Charley	November 2003

===== Series 1 (2007) =====
The first series of the Eighth Doctor Adventures began with Blood of the Daleks, a two part story spread across two separate releases and showcasing a more violent approach.

Re-released as 'The Eighth Doctor and Lucie Miller Series 1 in October 2023.

No.	Title	Directed by	Written by	Featuring	Released
1	"Blood of the Daleks (Part 1)"	Nicholas Briggs	Steve Lyons	Eighth Doctor, Lucie Miller, Daleks, the Headhunter	January 2007
2	"Blood of the Daleks (Part 2)"	Nicholas Briggs	Steve Lyons	Eighth Doctor, Lucie, Daleks, the Headhunter	February 2007
3	"Horror of Glam Rock"	Barnaby Edwards	Paul Magrs	Eighth Doctor, Lucie, the Headhunter	March 2007
4	"Immortal Beloved"	Jason Haigh-Ellery	Jonathan Clements	Eighth Doctor, Lucie	April 2007
5	"Phobos"	Barnaby Edwards	Eddie Robson	Eighth Doctor, Lucie, the Headhunter	May 2007
6	"No More Lies"	Barnaby Edwards	Paul Sutton	Eighth Doctor, Lucie, the Headhunter	June 2007
7	"Human Resources (Part 1)"	Nicholas Briggs	Eddie Robson	Eighth Doctor, Lucie, the Headhunter	July 2007
8	"Human Resources (Part 2)"	Nicholas Briggs	Eddie Robson	Eighth Doctor, Lucie, the Headhunter, Cybermen	August 2007

===== Series 2 (2008) =====
Re-released as The Eighth Doctor and Lucie Miller Series 2 in June 2024.

No.	Title	Directed by	Written by	Featuring	Released
1	"Dead London"	Barnaby Edwards	Pat Mills	Eighth Doctor, Lucie	January 2008
2	"Max Warp"	Barnaby Edwards	Jonathan Morris	Eighth Doctor, Lucie	February 2008
3	"Brave New Town"	Jason Haigh-Ellery	Jonathan Clements	Eighth Doctor, Lucie, Autons	March 2008
4	"The Skull of Sobek"	Barnaby Edwards	Marc Platt	Eighth Doctor, Lucie	April 2008
5	"Grand Theft Cosmos"	Barnaby Edwards	Eddie Robson	Eighth Doctor, Lucie, the Headhunter	May 2008
6	"The Zygon Who Fell to Earth"	Barnaby Edwards	Paul Magrs	Eighth Doctor, Lucie, Zygons	June 2008
7	"Sisters of the Flame (Part 1)"	Nicholas Briggs	Nicholas Briggs	Eighth Doctor, Lucie, Sisterhood of Karn	July 2008
8	"Vengeance of Morbius (Part 2)"	Nicholas Briggs	Nicholas Briggs	Eighth Doctor, Lucie, Morbius	August 2008

===== Series 3 (2009) =====
No.	Title	Directed by	Written by	Featuring	Released
1	"Orbis"	Nicholas Briggs	Alan Barnes, Nicholas Briggs	Eighth Doctor, Lucie, the Headhunter	March 2009
2	"Hothouse"	Barnaby Edwards	Jonathan Morris	Eighth Doctor, Lucie, Krynoids	April 2009
3	"The Beast of Orlok"	Barnaby Edwards	Barnaby Edwards	Eighth Doctor, Lucie	May 2009
4	"Wirrn Dawn"	Nicholas Briggs	Nicholas Briggs	Eighth Doctor, Lucie, Wirrn	June 2009
5	"The Scapegoat"	Nicholas Briggs	Pat Mills	Eighth Doctor, Lucie	July 2009
6	"The Cannibalists"	Jason Haigh-Ellery	Jonathan Morris	Eighth Doctor, Lucie	August 2009
7	"The Eight Truths (Part 1)"	Nicholas Briggs	Eddie Robson	Eighth Doctor, Lucie, the Headhunter	September 2009
8	"Worldwide Web (Part 2)"	Nicholas Briggs	Eddie Robson	Eighth Doctor, Lucie, the Headhunter, the Eight Legs	October 2009

===== Series 4 (2009–11) =====
No.	Title	Directed by	Written by	Featuring	Released
1	"Death in Blackpool"	Barnaby Edwards	Alan Barnes	Eighth Doctor, Lucie, Zygons	December 2009
2	"Situation Vacant"	Nicholas Briggs	Eddie Robson	Eighth Doctor, Tamsin Drew	July 2010
3	"Nevermore"	Nicholas Briggs	Alan Barnes	Eighth Doctor, Tamsin	August 2010
4	"The Book of Kells"	Barnaby Edwards	Barnaby Edwards	Eighth Doctor, Tamsin, the Monk, Lucie	September 2010
5	"Deimos (Part 1)"	Barnaby Edwards	Jonathan Morris	Eighth Doctor, Tamsin, Ice Warriors	October 2010
6	"The Resurrection of Mars (Part 2)"	Barnaby Edwards	Jonathan Morris	Eighth Doctor, Tamsin, Lucie, Ice Warriors, the Monk	November 2010
7	"Relative Dimensions"	Barnaby Edwards	Marc Platt	Eighth Doctor, Lucie, Susan Foreman, Alex Campbell	December 2010
8	"Prisoner of the Sun"	Jason Haigh-Ellery	Eddie Robson	Eighth Doctor	January 2011
9	"Lucie Miller (Part 1)"	Nicholas Briggs	Nicholas Briggs	Eighth Doctor, Lucie, Tamsin, Susan, Alex, the Monk, Daleks	February 2011
10	"To the Death (Part 2)"	Nicholas Briggs	Nicholas Briggs	Eighth Doctor, Lucie, Tamsin, Susan, Alex, the Monk, Daleks	March 2011

===== Special (2010) =====
No.	Title	Directed by	Written by	Featuring	Released
–	"An Earthly Child"	Nicholas Briggs	Marc Platt	Eighth Doctor, Susan Foreman, Alex Campbell	December 2010

==== Dark Eyes (2012–2015) ====
Starting with Dark Eyes, Big Finish abandoned singular releases for the range and opted to move to Boxsets. During this era, It would heavily focus arcs and storylines that would play out across four boxsets. They would discontinue this format after Stranded and the end of The Monthly Adventures.

===== Series 1 (2012) =====
No.	Title	Directed by	Written by	Featuring	Released
1	"The Great War"	Nicholas Briggs	Nicholas Briggs	Eighth Doctor, Molly O'Sullivan, Daleks	November 2012
2	"Fugitives"	Nicholas Briggs	Nicholas Briggs	Eighth Doctor, Molly, Sally Armstrong, Daleks	November 2012
3	"Tangled Web"	Nicholas Briggs	Nicholas Briggs	Eighth Doctor, Molly, Daleks	November 2012
4	"X and the Daleks"	Nicholas Briggs	Nicholas Briggs	Eighth Doctor, Molly, Daleks	November 2012
Part 1: After a devastating encounter with the Daleks, the Doctor is searching for hope. At this delicate moment in his life, the Time Lords send him on an important mission. Tracking down a DNA trace, he arrives in World War I, where he finds a Voluntary Aid Detachment nursing assistant with unusually dark eyes named Molly O’Sullivan. Part 2: The Doctor and Molly are on the run from the Daleks. They escape into the near future, World War II and then further to 1972, where a woman is waiting for him, following the instructions the Doctor hasn't yet given. Part 3: Molly has enjoyed several adventures with the Doctor, but her past still haunts her. To discover the truth, they go back to an incident that occurred in 1893, when she was only two years old. Part 4: The Doctor suddenly finds himself on planet Srangor, an innocent world conquered by the Daleks for a top secret plan that centers around Molly O'Sullivan.

===== Series 2 (2014) =====
No.	Title	Directed by	Written by	Featuring	Released
1	"The Traitor"	Nicholas Briggs	Nicholas Briggs	Eighth Doctor, Liv Chenka, Daleks	February 2014
2	"The White Room"	Nicholas Briggs	Alan Barnes	Eighth Doctor, Molly O'Sullivan, Viyrans	February 2014
3	"Time's Horizon"	Nicholas Briggs	Matt Fitton	Eighth Doctor, Molly, Liv, the Eminence	February 2014
4	"Eyes of the Master"	Nicholas Briggs	Matt Fitton	Eighth Doctor, Molly, Liv, the Master, Sally Armstrong, the Eminence	February 2014
Part 1: The human colony planet Nixyce VII falls under Dalek occupation. Medical technician Liv Chenka is used by the Dalek Time Controller to give medical care to the natives of Nixyce VII used as slaves by the Daleks. It was in that situation that she encountered the Eighth Doctor, which was actually the second time they met (as she had previously met the Seventh Doctor). After she was convinced of his identity, she helped him with his plans to turn the Daleks against a nearby fleet of the gaseous entity and psychic force known as the Eminence. Part 2: In 1918, Molly O'Sullivan, now living in Baker Street in London, must join the Doctor once again when they have an encounter with the Viyrans. Part 3: The Doctor and Molly travel to the edge of the universe and find the cryo-ship Orpheus, where they discover that Liv Chenka is among the ship's crew. As it turns out, Liv and several others escaped the Dalek invasion of Nixyce VII on board the ship, but she suffered severe radiation poisoning as a result, which condemned her to death. Because of this, she signed up as a med-tech on the ship and went into cryo-sleep. Shortly after the Doctor and Molly encounter Liv, the ship comes under attack by the Eminence, and it began to possess the crew. After defeating the Eminence, Molly and the Doctor were joined on their travels by Liv. Part 4: The Doctor, Molly and Liv arrive back on Earth in the 1970s to investigate the Ides Institute. There, Molly and Liv help the Doctor defeat the Master, who is trying to gain control over the Eminence. After both the Master and the Eminence were defeated, the Doctor made Molly and Liv stay behind in Baker Street in London while he traveled to Nixyce VII to play out the events in which Liv first met him. One night, Molly is kidnapped by the Master and his assistant, Sally Armstrong.

===== Series 3 (2014) =====
No.	Title	Directed by	Written by	Featuring	Released
1	"The Death of Hope"	Ken Bentley	Matt Fitton	Eighth Doctor, Molly O'Sullivan, Sally Armstrong, Narvin, the Master, the Eminence	November 2014
2	"The Reviled"	Ken Bentley	Matt Fitton	Eighth Doctor, Liv Chenka, Sally, Narvin, the Master, the Eminence	November 2014
3	"Masterplan"	Ken Bentley	Matt Fitton	Eighth Doctor, Liv, Molly, Sally, Narvin, the Master, the Eminence	November 2014
4	"Rule of the Eminence"	Ken Bentley	Matt Fitton	Eighth Doctor, Liv, Molly, Narvin, the Master, the Eminence	November 2014

===== Series 4 (2015) =====
No.	Title	Directed by	Written by	Featuring	Released
1	"A Life in the Day"	Ken Bentley	John Dorney	Eighth Doctor, Liv Chenka	March 2015
2	"The Monster of Montmartre"	Ken Bentley	Matt Fitton	Eighth Doctor, Liv, the Master, Daleks	March 2015
3	"Master of the Daleks"	Ken Bentley	John Dorney	Eighth Doctor, Liv, Molly O'Sullivan, the Master, Daleks, Sontarans	March 2015
4	"Eye of Darkness"	Ken Bentley	Matt Fitton	Eighth Doctor, Liv, Molly, Daleks, the Eminence	March 2015

==== Doom Coalition (2015–2017) ====
===== Series 1 (2015) =====
No.	Title	Directed by	Written by	Featuring	Released
1	"The Eleven"	Ken Bentley	Matt Fitton	Seventh Doctor, Eighth Doctor, Liv Chenka, the Eleven, Padrac	October 2015
2	"The Red Lady"	Ken Bentley	John Dorney	Eighth Doctor, Liv, Helen Sinclair, Caleera	October 2015
3	"The Galileo Trap"	Ken Bentley	Marc Platt	Eighth Doctor, Liv, Helen	October 2015
4	"The Satanic Mill"	Ken Bentley	Edward Collier	Eighth Doctor, Liv, Helen, the Eleven, Padrac	October 2015

===== Series 2 (2016) =====
No.	Title	Directed by	Written by	Featuring	Released
1	"Beachhead"	Ken Bentley	Nicholas Briggs	Eighth Doctor, Liv, Helen, Voord	March 2016
2	"Scenes from Her Life"	Ken Bentley	John Dorney	Eighth Doctor, Liv, Helen, Caleera, the Eleven	March 2016
3	"The Gift"	Ken Bentley	Marc Platt	Eighth Doctor, Liv, Helen, Caleera	March 2016
4	"The Sonomancer"	Ken Bentley	Matt Fitton	Eighth Doctor, Liv, Helen, River Song, Caleera, the Eleven	March 2016

===== Series 3 (2016) =====
Doom Coalition 3 was released in September 2016 and is directed by Ken Bentley.

No.	Title	Directed by	Written by	Featuring	Released
1	"Absent Friends"	Ken Bentley	John Dorney	Eighth Doctor, Liv, Helen	September 2016
2	"The Eighth Piece"	Ken Bentley	Matt Fitton	Eighth Doctor, Liv, Helen, River, the Eight, the Clocksmith	September 2016
3	"The Doomsday Chronometer"	Ken Bentley	Matt Fitton	Eighth Doctor, Liv, Helen, River, the Eight, the Clocksmith	September 2016
4	"The Crucible of Souls"	Ken Bentley	John Dorney	Eighth Doctor, Liv, Helen, River, the Nine, Padrac	September 2016

===== Series 4 (2017) =====
Doom Coalition 4 was released in March 2017 and is directed by Ken Bentley.

No.	Title	Directed by	Written by	Featuring	Released
1	"Ship in a Bottle"	Ken Bentley	John Dorney	Eighth Doctor, Liv, Helen	March 2017
2	"Songs of Love"	Ken Bentley	Matt Fitton	Eighth Doctor, Liv, Helen, River, Padrac, Caleera, the Eleven	March 2017
3	"The Side of the Angels"	Ken Bentley	Matt Fitton	Eighth Doctor, Liv, Helen, Ollistra, Caleera, the Eleven, the Monk, Weeping Angels	March 2017
4	"Stop the Clock"	Ken Bentley	John Dorney	Eighth Doctor, Liv, Helen, the Eleven, Padrac, Caleera	March 2017

==== Ravenous (2018–2019) ====
===== Series 1 (2018) =====
No.	Title	Directed by	Written by	Featuring	Released
1	"Their Finest Hour"	Ken Bentley	John Dorney	Eighth Doctor, Liv Chenka, Winston Churchill	April 2018
2	"How to Make a Killing in Time Travel"	Ken Bentley	John Dorney	Eighth Doctor, Liv	April 2018
3	"World of Damnation"	Ken Bentley	Matt Fitton	Eighth Doctor, Liv, Helen Sinclair, the Eleven, Kandyman	April 2018
4	"Sweet Salvation"	Ken Bentley	Matt Fitton	Eighth Doctor, Liv, Helen, the Eleven, Kandyman	April 2018
Part 1: As they begin their search for Helen, the Doctor and Liv are drawn to World War Two to assist Churchill in investigating an apparent new weapon. Part 2: The search for Helen is further interrupted when the Doctor investigates the temporal distortions of a new form of time travel. Part 3: The Doctor and Liv trace Helen to an alien prison, but are shocked to learn that she is attempting to help the Eleven. Part 4: The true agenda of the Eleven and the restored Kandyman is revealed.

===== Series 2 (2018) =====
No.	Title	Directed by	Written by	Featuring	Released
1	"Escape from Kaldor"	Ken Bentley	Matt Fitton	Eighth Doctor, Liv, Helen, Voc Robots	October 2018
2	"Better Watch Out"	Ken Bentley	John Dorney	Eighth Doctor, Liv, Helen	October 2018
3	"Fairytale of Salzburg"	Ken Bentley	John Dorney	Eighth Doctor, Liv, Helen	October 2018
4	"Seizure"	Ken Bentley	Guy Adams	Eighth Doctor, Liv, Helen, the Eleven	October 2018
Part 1: An attempt to take Liv home to visit her family results in the TARDIS crew becoming caught up in a botched robbery attempt. Part 2: The Doctor's attempt to take his companions on a holiday in twentieth-century Salzburg results in them becoming caught up in a living nightmare when the mythical Krampus comes to life. Part 3: With the Doctor unavailable, Helen must resort to desperate measures to stop the Krampus. Part 4: Responding to a distress call from an old TARDIS, the Doctor, Liv and Helen find the Eleven, who is being hunted by the one being even the Time Lords fear...

===== Series 3 (2019) =====
No.	Title	Directed by	Written by	Featuring	Released
1	"Deeptime Frontier"	Ken Bentley	Matt Fitton	Eighth Doctor, Liv, Helen	April 2019
2	"Companion Piece"	Ken Bentley	John Dorney	Eighth Doctor, Liv, Helen, Charley Pollard, River Song, Bliss, the Nine	April 2019
3	"L.E.G.E.N.D"	Ken Bentley	Matt Fitton	Eighth Doctor, Liv, Helen, the Eleven	April 2019
4	"The Odds Against"	Ken Bentley	John Dorney	Eighth Doctor, Liv, Helen, the Nine, the Eleven	April 2019
Part 1: On a distant Time Lord research facility, the Doctor, Liv and Helen attempt to learn more about their new enemy. Part 2: With the Doctor missing, Liv and Helen are captured by the Nine as he attempts to use River Song to assemble a 'collection' of all of the Doctor's companions, forcing Liv and Helen to work with their predecessors (and even a potential successor) to escape his prison. Part 3: Forced into an alliance with the Eleven, the Doctor, Liv and Helen attempt to research the Ravenous, but find themselves fighting to protect the Brothers Grimm in the process. Part 4: Tracing a lead to the location where the Ravenous apparently originally emerged into the universe, the TARDIS crew fall into an unexpected trap.

===== Series 4 (2019) =====
No.	Title	Directed by	Written by	Featuring	Released
1	"Whisper"	Ken Bentley	Matt Fitton	Eighth Doctor, Liv, Helen, The Eleven	October 2019
2	"Planet of Dust"	Ken Bentley	Matt Fitton	Eighth Doctor, Liv, Helen, The Eleven, The Master	October 2019
3	"Day of the Master – Part 1"	Ken Bentley	John Dorney	Eighth Doctor, Liv, Helen, The Eleven, The Master	October 2019
4	"Day of the Master – Part 2"	Ken Bentley	John Dorney	Eighth Doctor, Liv, Helen, The Eleven, The Master	October 2019
Part 1: An attempt to get the Eleven examined by a professional leads to the TARDIS arriving on a particularly dangerous planet. Part 2: The Eleven's request that he be left on a particular planet to meditate is part of a hunt for a dangerous secret, but the Master is after the same thing. Part 3: As the Eleven's alliance with the Ravenous continues, the Doctor, Liv and Helen are separated across time, and their only ally in each time period is a different incarnation of the Master. Part 4: As the Doctor, Liv and Helen come back together, the Ravenous's plans with the Eleven come to fruition, and the only hope for existence is an ancient Time Lord legend and an alliance between the three Masters.

==== Stranded (2020–2022) ====
===== Series 1 (2020) =====
Featuring the first appearance of Tania Bell (Rebecca Root), the first transgender companion in any Doctor Who media.

No.	Title	Directed by	Written by	Featuring	Released
1	"Lost Property"	Ken Bentley	Matt Fitton	Eighth Doctor, Helen, Liv, Tania Bell, Robin Bright-Thompson, The Curator	June 2020
2	"Wild Animals"	Ken Bentley	John Dorney	Eighth Doctor, Helen, Liv, Tania	June 2020
3	"Must-See TV"	Ken Bentley	Lisa McMullin	Eighth Doctor, Helen, Liv, Tania, Andy Davidson, Robin, Mr. Bird	June 2020
4	"Divine Intervention"	Ken Bentley	David K Barnes	Eighth Doctor, Helen, Liv, Tania, Andy, Robin	June 2020

===== Series 2 (2021) =====
No.	Title	Directed by	Written by	Featuring	Released
1	"Dead Time"	Ken Bentley	Matt Fitton	Eighth Doctor, Liv, Helen, Tania, Andy, Robin	March 2021
2	"UNIT Dating"	Ken Bentley	Roy Gill	Eighth Doctor, Liv, Helen, Tania, Andy, the Brigadier	March 2021
3	"Baker Street Irregulars"	Ken Bentley	Lisa McMullin	Eighth Doctor, Liv, Helen, Tania, Andy	March 2021
4	"The Long Way Round"	Ken Bentley	John Dorney	Eighth Doctor, Liv, Helen, Tania, Andy, Robin	March 2021

===== Series 3 (2021) =====
No.	Title	Directed by	Written by	Featuring	Released
1	"Patience"	Ken Bentley	Tim Foley	Eighth Doctor, Liv, Helen, Tania, Andy, Judoon	December 2021
2	"Twisted Folklore"	Ken Bentley	Lizzie Hopley	Eighth Doctor, Liv, Helen, Tania, Andy	December 2021
3	"Snow"	Ken Bentley	James Kettle	Eighth Doctor, Liv, Helen, Tania, Andy	December 2021
4	"What Just Happened?"	Ken Bentley	John Dorney	Eighth Doctor, Liv, Helen, Tania, Andy, Robin	December 2021

===== Series 4 (2022) =====
No.	Title	Directed by	Written by	Featuring	Released
1	"Crossed Lines"	Ken Bentley	Matt Fitton	Eighth Doctor, Helen, Liv, Tania, Mr. Bird, Robin, The Curator	April 2022
2	"Get Andy"	Ken Bentley	Lisa McMullin	Eighth Doctor, Helen, Liv, Andy, Mr. Bird	April 2022
3	"The Keys of Baker Street"	Ken Bentley	Roy Gill	Eighth Doctor, Helen, Liv, Tania, Andy, Mr. Bird, Robin, The Curator	April 2022
4	"Best Year Ever"	Ken Bentley	John Dorney	Eighth Doctor, Liv, Helen, Tania, Andy	April 2022

==== Standalone boxsets (2022–) ====
===== What Lies Inside? (2022) =====
After the end of Stranded and The Monthly Adventures, Big Finished moved away from the four-part boxset approach and ongoing arcs. Instead, focusing on two main boxsets per year that are typically released from November to December.

Set after Stranded.

No.	Title	Directed by	Written by	Featuring	Released
1	"Paradox of the Daleks (Part 1)"	Ken Bentley	John Dorney	Eighth Doctor, Liv, Helen, Daleks	November 2022
2	"Paradox of the Daleks (Part 2)"	Ken Bentley	John Dorney	Eighth Doctor, Liv, Helen, Daleks	November 2022
3	"The Dalby Spook"	Ken Bentley	Lauren Mooney & Stewart Pringle	Eighth Doctor, Liv, Helen	November 2022

===== Connections (2022) =====
No.	Title	Directed by	Written by	Featuring	Released
1	"Here Lies Drax"	Ken Bentley	John Dorney	Eighth Doctor, Liv, Helen, Drax	December 2022
2	"The Love Vampires"	Ken Bentley	James Kettle	Eighth Doctor, Liv, Helen	December 2022
3	"Albie's Angels"	Ken Bentley	Roy Gill	Eighth Doctor, Liv, Helen, Weeping Angels	December 2022

===== Audacity (2023) =====
Set earlier in the Eighth Doctor's life.

No.	Title	Directed by	Written by	Featuring	Released
1	"The Devouring"	Ken Bentley	Lisa McMullin	Eighth Doctor, Lady Audacity Montague	November 2023
2	"The Great Cyber War (Part 1)"	Ken Bentley	Tim Foley	Eighth Doctor, Audacity, Cybermen	November 2023
3	"The Great Cyber War (Part 2)"	Ken Bentley	Tim Foley	Eighth Doctor, Audacity, Cybermen	November 2023

===== In The Bleak Midwinter (2023) =====
No.	Title	Directed by	Written by	Featuring	Released
1	"Twenty-Four Doors in December"	Ken Bentley	John Dorney	Eighth Doctor, Audacity, Charley	December 2023
2	"The Empty Man"	Ken Bentley	Tim Foley	Eighth Doctor, Audacity, Charley	December 2023
3	"Winter of the Demon"	Ken Bentley	Roy Gill	Eighth Doctor, Audacity, Charley	December 2023

===== Echoes (2024) =====
No.	Title	Directed by	Written by	Featuring	Released
1	"Birdsong"	Ken Bentley	Tim Foley	Eighth Doctor, Liv, Helen	May 2024
2	"Lost Hearts"	Ken Bentley	Lauren Mooney & Stewart Pringle	Eighth Doctor, Liv, Helen	May 2024
3	"Slow Beasts"	Ken Bentley	Dan Rebellato	Eighth Doctor, Liv, Helen	May 2024

===== Deadly Strangers (2024) =====
No.	Title	Directed by	Written by	Featuring	Released
1	"Puccini and the Doctor"	Ken Bentley	Matthew Jacobs	Eighth Doctor, Audacity, Charley	December 2024
2	"Women's Day Off"	Ken Bentley	Lisa McMullin	Eighth Doctor, Audacity, Charley	December 2024
3	"The Gloaming"	Ken Bentley	Lauren Mooney & Stewart Pringle	Eighth Doctor, Audacity, Charley	December 2024

===== The Causeway (2025) =====
No.	Title	Directed by	Written by	Featuring	Released
1	"Lost Amongst the Stars"	Ken Bentley	Rochana Patel	Eighth Doctor, Audacity, Charley	November 2025
2	"The Time You Never Had – Part 1"	Ken Bentley	Tim Foley	Eighth Doctor, Audacity, Charley	November 2025
3	"The Time You Never Had – Part 2"	Ken Bentley	Tim Foley	Eighth Doctor, Audacity, Charley	November 2025

===== Empty Vessels (2025) =====
No.	Title	Directed by	Written by	Featuring	Released
1	"Eos Falling"	Ken Bentley	Matt Fitton	Eighth Doctor, Liv, Helen	December 2025
2	"Lure of the Zygons – Part 1"	Ken Bentley	Roy Gill	Eighth Doctor, Liv, Helen	December 2025
3	"Lure of the Zygons – Part 2"	Ken Bentley	Roy Gill	Eighth Doctor, Liv, Helen	December 2025

===== New Pathways (2026) =====
No.	Title	Directed by	Written by	Featuring	Released
Volume 1: New Pathways
1	"Chase"	Ken Bentley	Alan Ronald	Eighth Doctor, Chase, Alfie	November 2026
2	"Magic of the Sycorax"	Ken Bentley	Katharine Armitage	Eighth Doctor, Chase, Alfie, the Sycorax	November 2026
3	"Blast from the Past"	Ken Bentley	Robert Valentine	Eighth Doctor, Chase, Alfie	November 2026
Volume 2: Fear the Reapers
4	"The Junction"	Ken Bentley	Helen Goldwyn	Eighth Doctor, Chase, Alfie, Reapers	December 2026
5	"Yesterday Dies Today"	Ken Bentley	Alfie Shaw	Eighth Doctor, Chase, Alfie, Reapers	December 2026
6	"Matilda"	Ken Bentley	Alan Ronald	Eighth Doctor, Chase, Alfie, Reapers	December 2026

=== Other series ===
==== The Eighth Doctor: Time War (2017–) ====
Set much later in the Eighth Doctor's timeline and a prequel to The War Doctor range. This explores Eighth Doctor's time attempting to avoid the Time War and his adventure with Bliss, and later Alex Campbell and Cass Fermazzi. It was originally known as The Eighth Doctor: The Time War before being rebranded.

===== Series 1 (2017) =====
No.	Title	Directed by	Written by	Featuring	Released
1	"The Starship of Theseus"	Ken Bentley	John Dorney	Eighth Doctor, Sheena, Bliss, Daleks	October 2017
2	"Echoes of War"	Ken Bentley	Matt Fitton	Eighth Doctor, Bliss, Daleks	October 2017
3	"The Conscript"	Ken Bentley	Matt Fitton	Eighth Doctor, Bliss, Ollistra, Daleks	October 2017
4	"One Life"	Ken Bentley	John Dorney	Eighth Doctor, Bliss, Ollistra, Daleks	October 2017
Part 1: A trip to a pleasure cruiser becomes complicated when the Time War starts to twist its history. Part 2: Trapped on a planet in the middle of the Time War, the Doctor's only hope to get the Theseus survivors to safety is an amnesiac Dalek. Part 3: The Doctor is forced to take part in training sessions for the Time Lord army. Part 4: A Dalek attack uncovers the secret behind the original attack on the Theseus.

===== Series 2 (2018) =====
This was the final box set to feature Jacqueline Pearce as Ollistra before her death in September 2018.

No.	Title	Directed by	Written by	Featuring	Released
1	"The Lords of Terror"	Ken Bentley	Jonathan Morris	Eighth Doctor, Bliss, Daleks	July 2018
2	"Planet of the Ogrons"	Ken Bentley	Guy Adams	Eighth Doctor, Bliss, Daleks, the Twelve, Ogrons	July 2018
3	"In the Garden of Death"	Ken Bentley	Guy Adams	Eighth Doctor, Bliss, Daleks, Ollistra, the Twelve	July 2018
4	"Jonah"	Ken Bentley	Timothy X Atack	Eighth Doctor, Bliss, Daleks, Ollistra, the Twelve	July 2018
Part 1: The Doctor attempts to take Bliss home, but discovers that her world's history has been corrupted by the Time Lords to turn it into a weapons facility. Part 2: The Twelve- now female and relying on a neural inhibitor to keep her personalities in check- recruits the Doctor and Bliss to investigate reports of an Ogron with Time Lord DNA who may be a regenerated Doctor. Part 3: Trapped in a Dalek prison with their memories erased, the Doctor, Bliss and the Twelve must find a way out before the Daleks get the information they're after. Part 4: The Doctor is forced to command a submarine patrol on a distant planet to find a mysterious creature.

===== Series 3 (2019) =====
No.	Title	Directed by	Written by	Featuring	Released
1	"State of Bliss"	Ken Bentley	Matt Fitton	Eighth Doctor, Bliss	August 2019
2	"The Famished Lands"	Ken Bentley	Lisa McMullin	Eighth Doctor, Bliss	August 2019
3	"Fugitive in Time"	Ken Bentley	Roland Moore	Eighth Doctor, Bliss	August 2019
4	"The War Valeyard"	Ken Bentley	John Dorney	Eighth Doctor, Bliss, The Valeyard	August 2019
Part 1: The Doctor's attempt to investigate Bliss's past becomes more complex when they are drawn into the lives Bliss might have lived. Part 2: A trip to a world ravaged by the Time War reveals the terrible lengths the population have gone to in order to escape starvation. Part 3: The Doctor must help find the last survivor of a people erased from existence by the Time Lords due to their dangerous time-travel experiments. Part 4: A series of nightmares lead the Doctor to discover that the Valeyard has been restored and is now fighting in the Time War.

===== Series 4 (2020) =====
This box set features Ken Bones reprising his role of the General, a character who appeared in the Fiftieth Anniversary special "The Day of the Doctor" in 2013 and made one final appearance in the Series 9 episode "Hell Bent" in 2015.

No.	Title	Directed by	Written by	Featuring	Released
1	"Palindrome – Part 1"	Helen Goldwyn	John Dorney	Eighth Doctor, Bliss, Davros, Daleks	September 2020
2	"Palindrome – Part 2"	Helen Goldwyn	John Dorney	Eighth Doctor, Bliss, Davros, Daleks	September 2020
3	"Dreadshade"	Helen Goldwyn	Lisa McMullin	Eighth Doctor, Bliss, The General, the Twelve	September 2020
4	"Restoration of the Daleks"	Helen Goldwyn	Matt Fitton	Eighth Doctor, Bliss, Davros, Daleks	September 2020
Part 1–2: The Daleks have been all but erased from history, but the Dalek Time Strategist has made contact with an alternate version of Davros as part of a plan to restart the War... Part 3: With almost all Time Lords having lost their memory of their old foe, the Twelve escapes custody and attempts to make a power grab on Gallifrey itself. Part 4: The restored Davros comes into conflict with the Dalek Emperor as the Daleks restart the Time War.

===== Series 5: Cass (2023) =====
No.	Title	Directed by	Written by	Featuring	Released
1	"Meanwhile, Elsewhere"	Ken Bentley	Tim Foley	Eighth Doctor, Cass Fermazzi, Alex Campbell	January 2023
2	"Vespertine"	Ken Bentley	Lou Morgan	Eighth Doctor, Cass, Alex	January 2023
3	"Previously, Next Time - Part 1"	Ken Bentley	James Moran	Eighth Doctor, Cass, Alex, Daleks	January 2023
4	"Previously, Next Time - Part 2"	Ken Bentley	James Moran	Eighth Doctor, Cass, Alex, Daleks	January 2023

===== Series 6: Uncharted 1: Reflections (2024) =====
No.	Title	Directed by	Written by	Featuring	Released
1	"Nowhere, Never"	Ken Bentley	Katerine Armitage	Eighth Doctor, Cass, Alex Campbell, Helen Sinclair, C'rizz	October 2024
2	"The Road Untravelled"	Ken Bentley	Tim Foley	Eighth Doctor, Cass, Alex Campbell, Helen Sinclair, C'rizz	October 2024
3	"Cass-cade"	Ken Bentley	James Moran	Eighth Doctor, Cass, Alex Campbell, Helen Sinclair, C'rizz	October 2024
4	"Borrow or Rob"	Ken Bentley	Tim Foley	Eighth Doctor, Cass, Alex Campbell, Helen Sinclair, C'rizz	October 2024

===== Series 7: Uncharted 2: Pursuit (2025) =====
No.	Title	Directed by	Written by	Featuring	Released
1	"Spoil of War"	Ken Bentley	Mark Wright	Eighth Doctor, Cass, Alex Campbell	June 2025
2	"The Tale of Alex"	Ken Bentley	Katerine Armitage	Eighth Doctor, Cass, Alex Campbell	June 2025
3	"See-Saw"	Ken Bentley	James Moran	Eighth Doctor, Cass, Alex Campbell	June 2025
4	"The First Forest"	Ken Bentley	Tim Foley	Eighth Doctor, Cass, Alex Campbell	June 2025

===== Series 8: Uncharted 3: Branches (2026) =====
No.	Title	Directed by	Written by	Featuring	Released
1	"The Only Girl in the World"	Ken Bentley	John Dorney	Eighth Doctor, Cass, Alex	May 2026
2	"False Dawn"	Ken Bentley	Alison Winter	Eighth Doctor, Cass, Alex	May 2026
3	"The Council of Susan"	Ken Bentley	Tim Foley	Eighth Doctor, Cass, Alex, Susan Foreman	May 2026
4	"All Over"	Ken Bentley	Patrick O'Connor	Eighth Doctor, Cass, Alex, Susan Foreman	May 2026

==== The Further Adventures of Lucie Miller (2019) ====
Announced in August 2018, this series is set between the first and second series of audio adventures.

No.	Title	Directed by	Written by	Featuring	Released
1	"The Dalek Trap"	Nicholas Briggs	Nicholas Briggs	Eighth Doctor, Lucie, Daleks, The Fendahl	July 2019
2	"The Revolution Game"	Nicholas Briggs	Alice Cavender	Eighth Doctor, Lucie, Daleks, The Fendahl	July 2019
3	"The House on the Edge of Chaos"	Nicholas Briggs	Eddie Robson	Eighth Doctor, Lucie, Daleks, The Fendahl	July 2019
4	"Island of the Fendahl"	Nicholas Briggs	Alan Barnes	Eighth Doctor, Lucie, Daleks, The Fendahl	July 2019

==== Charlotte Pollard – The Further Adventuress (2022) ====
No.	Title	Directed by	Written by	Featuring	Released
1	"The Mummy Speaks!"	Ken Bentley	Alan Barnes	Eighth Doctor, Charley, Deeva Jansen	January 2022
2	"Eclipse"	Ken Bentley	Lisa McMullin	Eighth Doctor, Charley, Deeva Jansen	January 2022
3	"The Slaying of the Writhing Mass"	Ken Bentley	Eddie Robson	Eighth Doctor, Charley, Deeva Jansen	January 2022
4	"Heart of Orion"	Ken Bentley	Nicholas Briggs	Eighth Doctor, Charley, Deeva Jansen	January 2022

==== The Stuff of Legend (2024) ====
A Special 25th Anniversary special of Big Finish Doctor Who audio dramas. Released alongside a full-cast live recording event at Cadogan Hall in London on Saturday 14 September 2024.

No.	Title	Directed by	Written by	Featuring	Released
–	"The Stuff of Legend (Studio Version)"	Barnaby Edwards	Robert Valentine	Eighth Doctor, Charley, The Master, Daleks	September 2024

== Audio dramas ==
=== Immortal Beloved ===
Cover

Immortal Beloved is an audio drama based on the series. It was produced by Big Finish Productions and was broadcast on BBC 7 on 21 January 2007. Ian McNeice would later play Winston Churchill in the revived series episodes "The Beast Below", "Victory of the Daleks" and "The Pandorica Opens" in 2010, and "The Wedding of River Song" in 2011. He also went on to star in The Renaissance Man in 2012. The cast is:

- The Doctor — Paul McGann
- Lucie Miller — Sheridan Smith
- Zeus — Ian McNeice
- Hera — Elspet Gray
- Kalkin — Anthony Spargo
- Sararti — Jennifer Higham
- Tayden/Ares — David Dobson
- Ganymede — Jake McGann

The Doctor and Lucie Miller land the TARDIS next to a cliff in what appears to be ancient Greece. Two star-crossed lovers, Kalkin and Sararti, have been preparing to kill themselves nearby, but the Doctor and Lucie prevent this, and soon anachronistic helicopters surround them all. One of the soldiers who disembark, General Ares, is gravely injured in the ensuing struggle. The Doctor just about saves his life and he, Lucie, Sararti and Kalkin are taken back to a grand palace, where to their horror they witness the ailing Ares' mind being transferred into the body of another man, one of the soldiers, who has expected this and is entirely willing to so sacrifice himself to his 'destiny'. The Doctor confronts Zeus, the autocratic ruler of this strange society where guns are labelled as magic wands and the hi-tech mind-transfer device is an 'incarnation chamber'.

Zeus admits that he is not really a god, and reveals that they are on a lost Earth colony planet in Lucie's distant future. Generations ago, he and his wife Hera, along with many others, some now long gone, landed here and he has gone on to create a society based upon Greek myth. He explains that he was the pilot of the original colony ship, and Kalkin is not his son, but his next-in-line clone, who has rebelled against his fate. The next clone after that, Ganymede, is by contrast committed to his cruel destiny, but is too young for a transfer. The ruling class, the remains of the original crew – the 'gods' – use their machine, which the Doctor insists has long been outlawed as an abomination – to transfer their minds periodically into their clones, giving them practical immortality. Zeus has appeared welcoming, but lusts after Lucie despite insisting that he and Hera have a thousand-year-old love.

He reveals himself to be a madman, and demands that the Doctor use the TARDIS to fetch parts to repair the immortality machine, as it has become worn out and they are now without space-travel capabilities. The Doctor very reluctantly agrees after Zeus threatens to hurt Lucie – even to clone her repeatedly and torture each Lucie to death for all eternity. When Hera suffers a heart attack, her mind transfer into the unwilling Sararti fails, leaving Sararti in control of her body. Pretending all is well, she suddenly stabs Zeus, so that he requires an immediate transfer into Kalkin's body. The Doctor appears to go along with this under pressure from Ares and the loyal soldiers, but ensures that it fails. Though Lucie and Sararti at first fail to appreciate this ruse, the Doctor and the new Zeus – Kalkin, of course – convince them that the lovers can secretly take on his and Hera's roles. They insist that they will stop using the machine as the Doctor and Lucie take their leave. Lucie is optimistic, but the Doctor reminds her that these two are essentially younger versions of the tyrannical pair they have helped to overthrow...

=== Phobos ===
Cover

Phobos is another audio drama based on the series, produced by Big Finish Productions and broadcast on BBC 7 on 28 January 2007. The cast is:

- The Doctor — Paul McGann
- Lucie Miller — Sheridan Smith
- Amy/Headhunter — Katarina Olsson
- Kai Tobias — Timothy West
- Eris — Nerys Hughes
- Drew — Ben Silverstone
- Hayd — John Schwab
- Farl — Tim Sutton
- Lad – Jake McGann

The Doctor and Lucie land on Phobos, the moon of Mars, which has become popular with extreme sports fans in the future, due to a wormhole on the surface which is used for bungee jumping. The Doctor and Lucie listen to Kai Tobias's stories of monsters on the surface, although no-one takes him seriously. Later the monsters from Tobias's stories appear and begin attacking visitors. When The Doctor discovers that the monsters are just robots, Tobias reveals that an entity from another universe is in the wormhole and that it feeds on the pleasurable fear extreme sports fans feel. However, it is hurt by real fear and Tobias made the robots to create real fear. The Doctor enters the wormhole and shows the entity his fears, which kill it, and The Doctor and Lucie leave. The Headhunter awakens on the moon's medical ward, angry that she has missed Lucie again.

The drama was also featured elsewhere:

- The 2000 Big Finish audio play The Fearmonger also features a creature which stirs up fear and feeds on it.
- The short story Crimson Dawn in the book Decalog 2: Lost Properties explains that Phobos is an artificial moon created by Ice Warriors.
- The 2006 Big Finish audio play Memory Lane features a character called Kim Kronotska who says she was on a Phobos mission.
- The Fifth Doctor comic strip story The Moderator features a reference to Phobos at the start of part 2.
- The Eighth Doctor visits Mars' other moon in Deimos.
- The Doctor, when showing the entity his own fears, mentions his fears of the future, and the fears of things that he sees he himself might have to do. This is possibly a reference to the events of the Time War, which was to occur in the Eighth Doctor's relative distant future, in which the Doctor was forced to kill all of his own people, the Time Lords.

== Awards and nominations ==
Year	Award ceremony	Category	Nominee(s)	Result	Ref.
2014	BBC Audio Drama Awards	Best Online or Non-Broadcast Drama	Dark Eyes	Won	
2016	Scribe Awards	Best Audio	Doom Coalition 1: "The Red Lady"	Won	
2017	BBC Audio Drama Awards	Best Online Only Audio Drama	Doom Coalition 3: "Absent Friends"	Won	
2021	Audie Awards	Audio Drama	Stranded 1	Won	
2023	Scribe Awards	Audio Drama	Time War 5: Cass: "Previously, Next Time Parts 1 & 2"	Nominated	
2023	Scribe Awards	Audio Drama	Connections: "Albie's Angels"	Nominated	
