= Dalek =

Fictional extraterrestrial race

- Doctor Who race
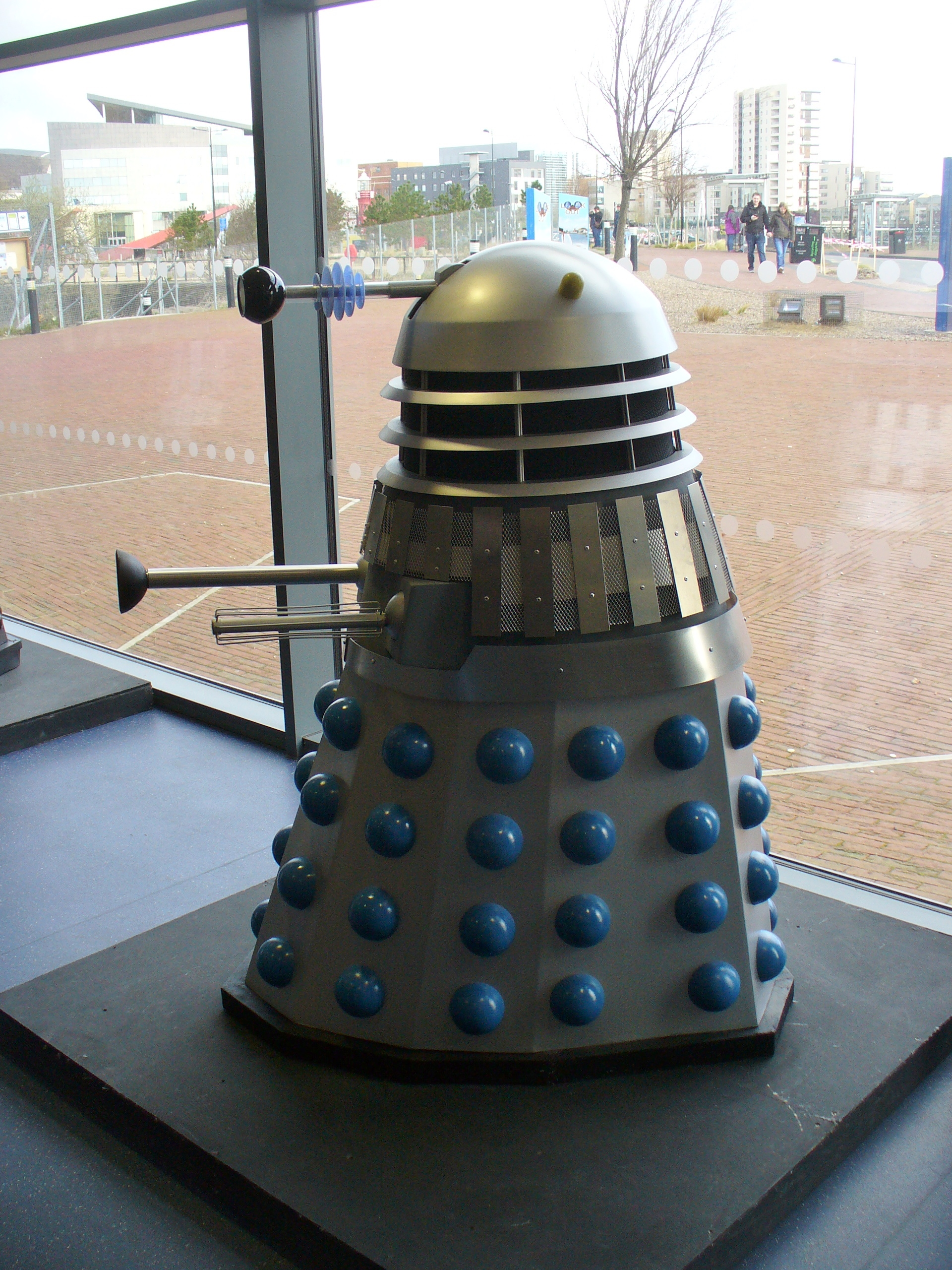
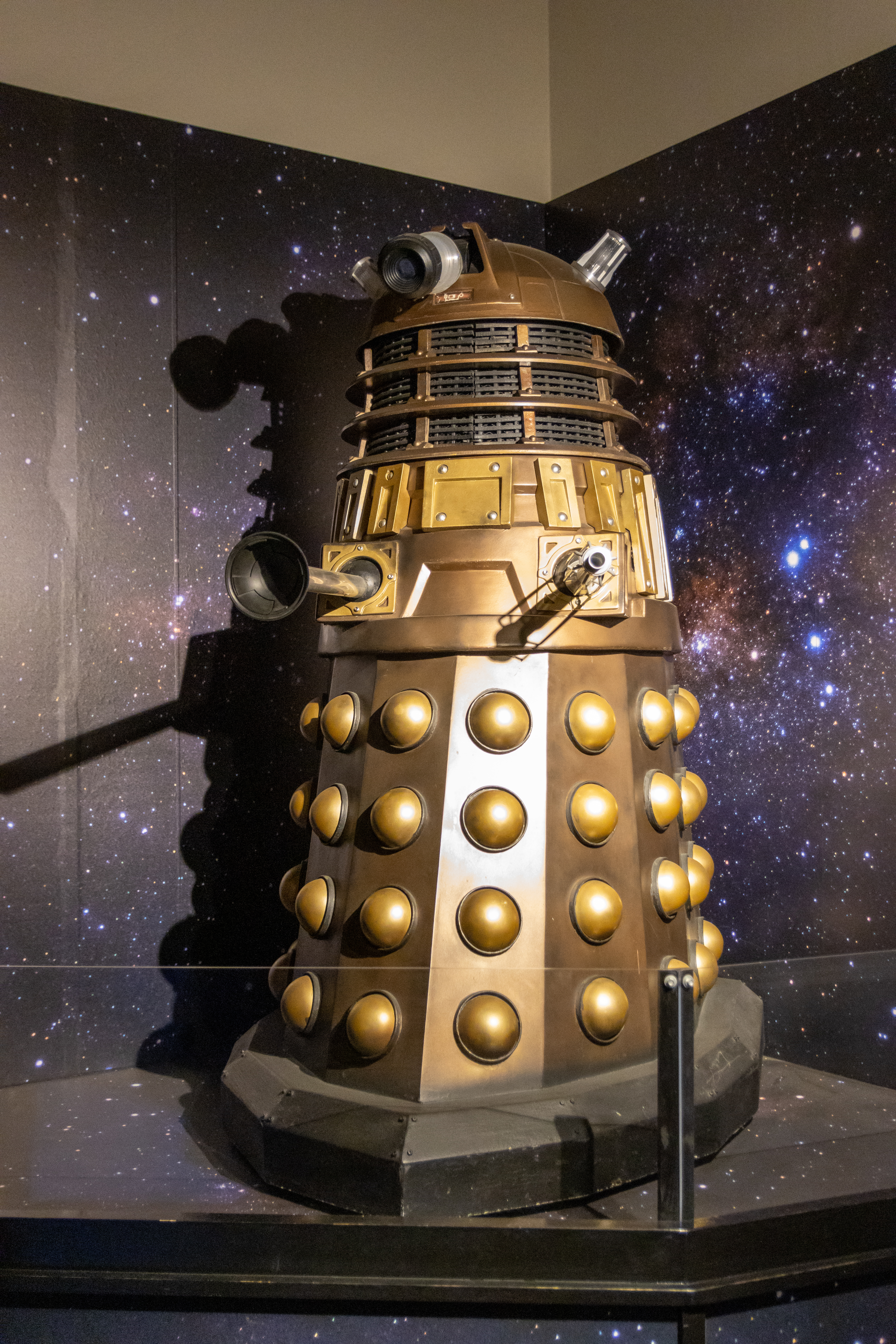
- Left: A Dalek's armour as it appears in the show from 1965 to 1967 on display at the Doctor Who Experience. Right: A Dalek's armour as primarily seen in the show's 2005 revival on display at Sudbury Hall.
- First appearance: The Daleks (1963)
- Created by: Terry Nation

In-universe information
- Created by: Davros
- Home world: Skaro

The Daleks (/ˈdɑː.lɛks/, DAH-leks) are a fictional extraterrestrial race who appear in the British science fiction television programme Doctor Who. They first appeared in the 1963 Doctor Who serial The Daleks. The Daleks are a highly xenophobic militant race who seek to destroy all non-Dalek life in the universe. They serve as the archenemies of the series' protagonist, the Doctor, who often comes into conflict with the Daleks throughout the show.

The Daleks were created by Terry Nation, who, between jobs, wrote their debut serial. Drawing on the cultural memory of the Nazi Party in Britain, Nation based the Daleks on them. He wished for a completely inhuman design, which would end up being designed by Raymond Cusick. Doctor Who, initially an educational show, only ran Nation's serial due to lacking any other options for production. However, the Daleks were a success with viewers and greatly boosted series viewership, kicking off a period referred to as Dalekmania, during which the Daleks and their battle armour became highly popular among the British public. The Daleks subsequently became major recurring antagonists in the programme, and would be brought back in a variety of fashions across the show's more than 60-year history.

The Daleks are the series' most popular and famous villains and their returns to television over the decades have often gained media attention. They are regarded as an icon of British popular culture, and their usage of the phrase "Exterminate" has become well-known even to those otherwise unfamiliar with the series. The Daleks' use of Nazi allegories and their relationship and dynamic with the Doctor have additionally been the subject of analysis among critics.

== History and appearances ==
=== Overview ===
Doctor Who is a long-running British science-fiction television series that began in 1963. It stars its protagonist, the Doctor, an alien who travels through time and space in a ship known as the TARDIS, as well as their travelling companions. When the Doctor dies, they are able to undergo a process known as "regeneration", completely changing the Doctor's appearance and personality. Throughout their travels, the Doctor often comes into conflict with various alien species and antagonists. Of these enemies, the Daleks have often been described as the Doctor's archenemies and greatest foes.

Daleks are highly xenophobic violent, merciless and pitiless cyborg aliens who hail from the irradiated planet Skaro. They lack any emotion other than hate, and demand total conformity to the will of the Dalek with the highest authority. They are bent on the conquest of the universe and the extermination of any other forms of life, including other "impure" Daleks which are deemed inferior for being different to them. The Daleks are a militant race, with little in the way of culture. They wish only to destroy any other beings they come across, and see hatred as beautiful. The Daleks are cyborgs, with the creature inside of the casing greatly resembling a one-eyed, gelatinous squid-like creature. The Dalek armour is virtually indestructible. The Dalek casing uses a plunger-like manipulator arm, though the arm has been replaced by other appendages, such as a claw-like design and a blowtorch, throughout the series. In-universe, the arm uses an intense vacuum of focused energy to manipulate objects, and Daleks are capable of crushing a human's skull with it. They also have a whisk-like gunstick weapon which can fire lasers at their enemies.

=== Classic Era ===
The Daleks first appeared in the 1963 serial The Daleks, where they are depicted as the inhabitants of a city on the planet Skaro. In the past, they had engaged in a nuclear war with the Thals, the other native species of Skaro, which forced the Daleks into their city, which they are unable to leave due to a dependency on static electricity. The First Doctor's (William Hartnell) companion and granddaughter Susan Foreman (Carole Ann Ford) attempts to negotiate peace between them and the Thals, but the Daleks seek to kill the Thals. The Doctor stages an uprising, with the Thals seemingly killing the Daleks as their static electricity power supply is knocked out.

The Daleks re-appeared in the 1964 serial The Dalek Invasion of Earth, where the Daleks invaded Earth following the planet's devastation in the far future from a meteor storm and plague. They attempted to drill to the planet's core and pilot the Earth through space, but were stopped by the Doctor. After a brief cameo in 1965's The Space Museum, they again re-appeared in 1965's The Chase, where the Daleks have developed time travel technology and attempt to kill the Doctor, but are defeated once again. 1965-1966's The Daleks' Master Plan depicted them attempting to use a device to destroy time. The Doctor and his allies are able to thwart the Daleks' plans, but at the cost of the death of the Doctor's companions Katarina (Adrienne Hill) and Sara Kingdom (Jean Marsh).

The Daleks later re-appeared in the 1966 serial The Power of the Daleks, where they infiltrated a human colony on the planet Vulcan, pretending to be servant robots. The newly regenerated Second Doctor (Patrick Troughton) was able to halt their plans and destroy them, saving the colony. The Daleks later appeared in the 1967 serial The Evil of the Daleks, which depicted the Daleks attempting to create a "perfect" Dalek by utilising a "human factor" to determine what has caused them to fail thus far, which would allow them to create a "Dalek factor" to counteract it. The Doctor was able to implant some of the Daleks with the human factor, causing an all-out civil war.

1972 serial Day of the Daleks depicted a group of Daleks who conquered Earth in the future using time travel to ensure their success in the past, but they are defeated by the Third Doctor (Jon Pertwee). The Third Doctor subsequently encounters them in the 1973 serial Frontier in Space, where they are revealed to secretly be behind the story's events. The Doctor pursues them, leading to the events of the 1973 serial Planet of the Daleks, where he allies with the Thals to destroy a Dalek army kept frozen on the planet Spiridon. The 1974 serial Death to the Daleks depicted their power systems as being drained due to the effects of the Exxilon city on the planet Exxilon, leading to them using low tech weapons in order to accomplish their goal of obtaining a highly plentiful deposit of a rare mineral found on the planet. The Daleks are destroyed at the serial's culmination.

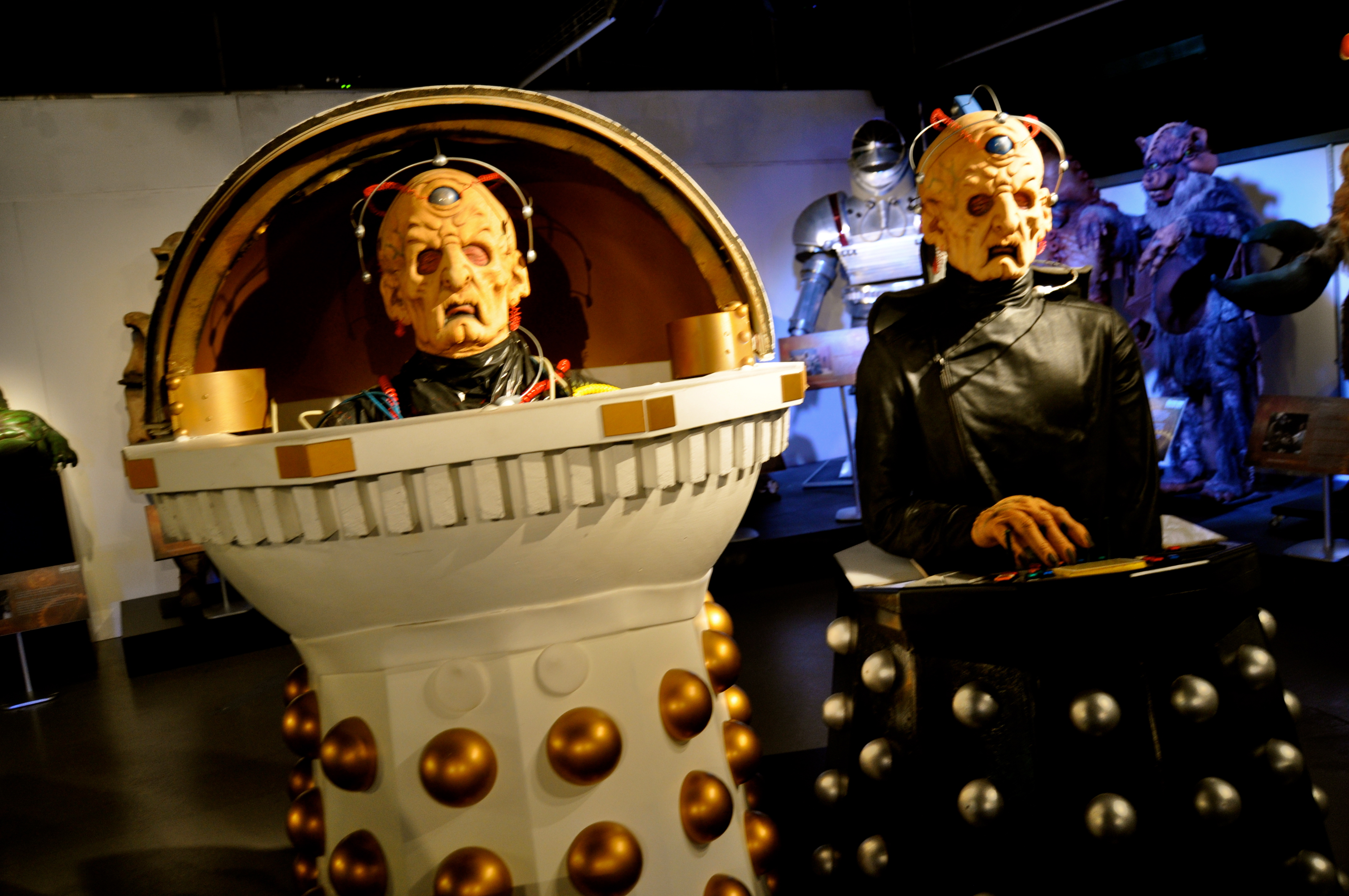
Davros as he appears in the Classic series (right) and Davros as the Dalek Emperor as portrayed in Remembrance of the Daleks (left), on display at the Doctor Who Experience

The Daleks re-appeared in the 1975 serial Genesis of the Daleks, which depicts the Fourth Doctor (Tom Baker) going back in time to destroy the Daleks at their creation per the request of his people, the Time Lords, who seek to have the Daleks destroyed before they grow too powerful to stop. During the war between the Thals and a race known as the Kaleds, the Kaled scientist Davros wishes to create "travel machines" in order to ensure the survival of his species. These travel machines, and the creatures that would inhabit them, would later become the Daleks, with Davros genetically engineering the creatures inhabiting the machines to be hateful beings. The Doctor is able to delay the Daleks' evolution by ensuring they are trapped in a bunker, with Davros being presumed killed.

The Daleks later realise that Davros, their creator, was not a pure Dalek, leading to a split in Dalek society: one loyal to Davros, and one where the Daleks ruled themselves. The 1979 serial Destiny of the Daleks saw the Daleks attempting to have Davros aid them in a war with the humanoid Movellans. The following Dalek serial, 1984's Resurrection of the Daleks, depicted the beginnings of a civil war between the two Dalek factions: The Imperials, which were loyal to Davros, and the Renegades, which were the self-ruled Daleks. Though this ended quickly, Davros escaped, and as depicted in the 1985 serial Revelation of the Daleks, Davros began using human bodies to try and recreate his own army of Imperial Daleks. The 1988 serial Remembrance of the Daleks saw the Renegades and Imperials fighting in 1960s London, with both sides, as well as the Dalek homeworld of Skaro, destroyed by the Seventh Doctor's (Sylvester McCoy) usage of a mystical artifact known as the Hand of Omega.

The Daleks made a brief cameo in the opening of the 1996 TV film Doctor Who, where they appear off-screen. The Daleks kill the Master in the movie's opening, with the Doctor returning to take back the Master's remains.

=== Revived Era ===
Sometime following the events of the 1996 film, the Daleks fought in a war against the Time Lords, which was pre-meditated by the Time Lords' interference in the Daleks' creation. The Daleks and Time Lords fought for an undisclosed amount of time in a devastating war known as the Last Great Time War. An incarnation of the Doctor who fought in the War, the War Doctor (John Hurt), used a weapon known as The Moment, which destroyed both sides of the conflict and ended the war. The Daleks were thought destroyed by the wider universe.

The Daleks first appeared in the revival in the 2005 episode "Dalek". In the episode, a sole survivor of the war crash landed on Earth. After being captured by an alien collector, it attempted to escape, though eventually committed suicide after a restoration process gave it human emotions. The Daleks appeared again in the 2005 two-part story, "Bad Wolf" and "The Parting of the Ways", where the Daleks' Emperor was revealed to have survived. The Emperor managed to rebuild the Dalek empire, but both he and his empire were destroyed after the Doctor's companion Rose Tyler (Billie Piper) absorbed the power of the time vortex, removing them from existence.

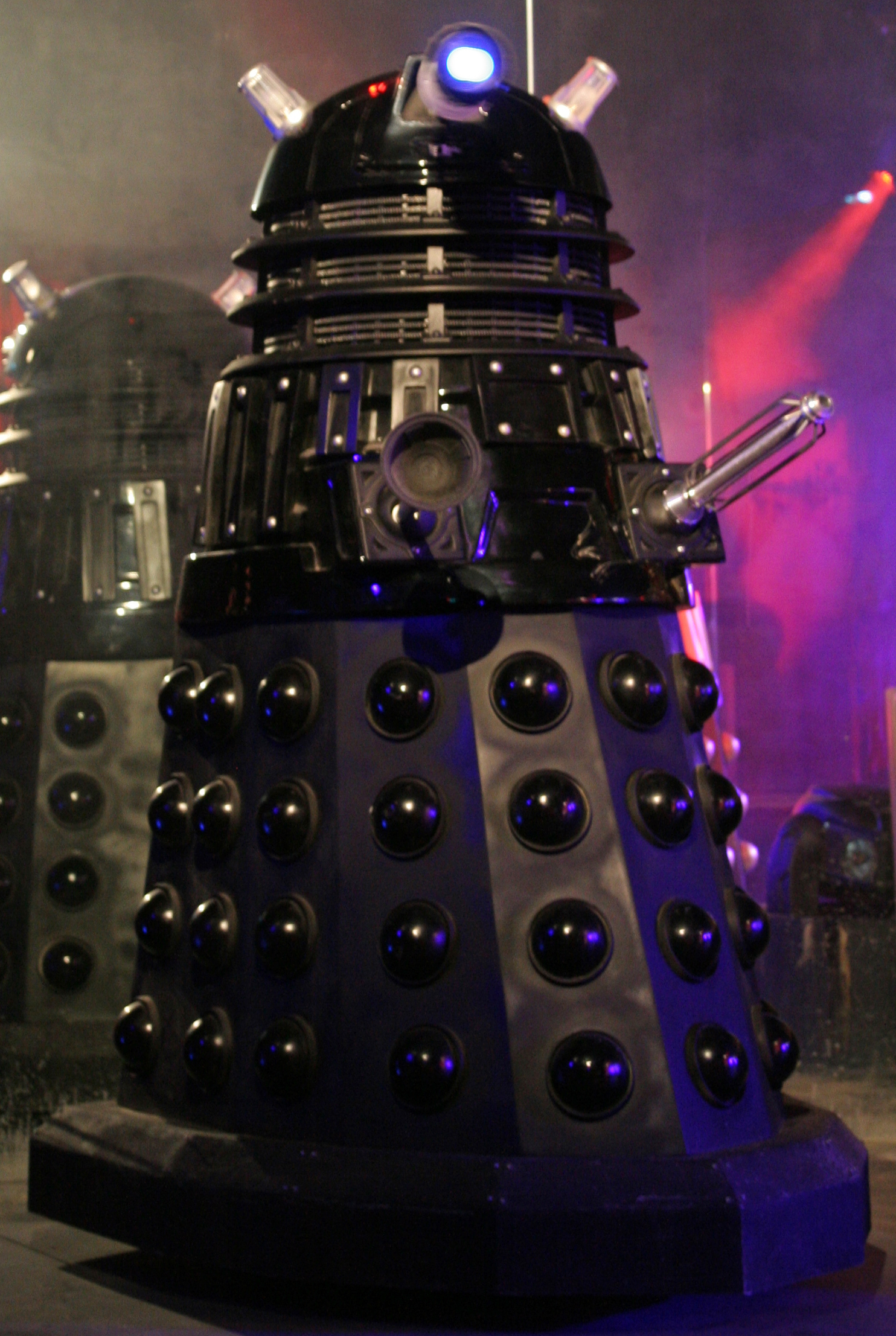
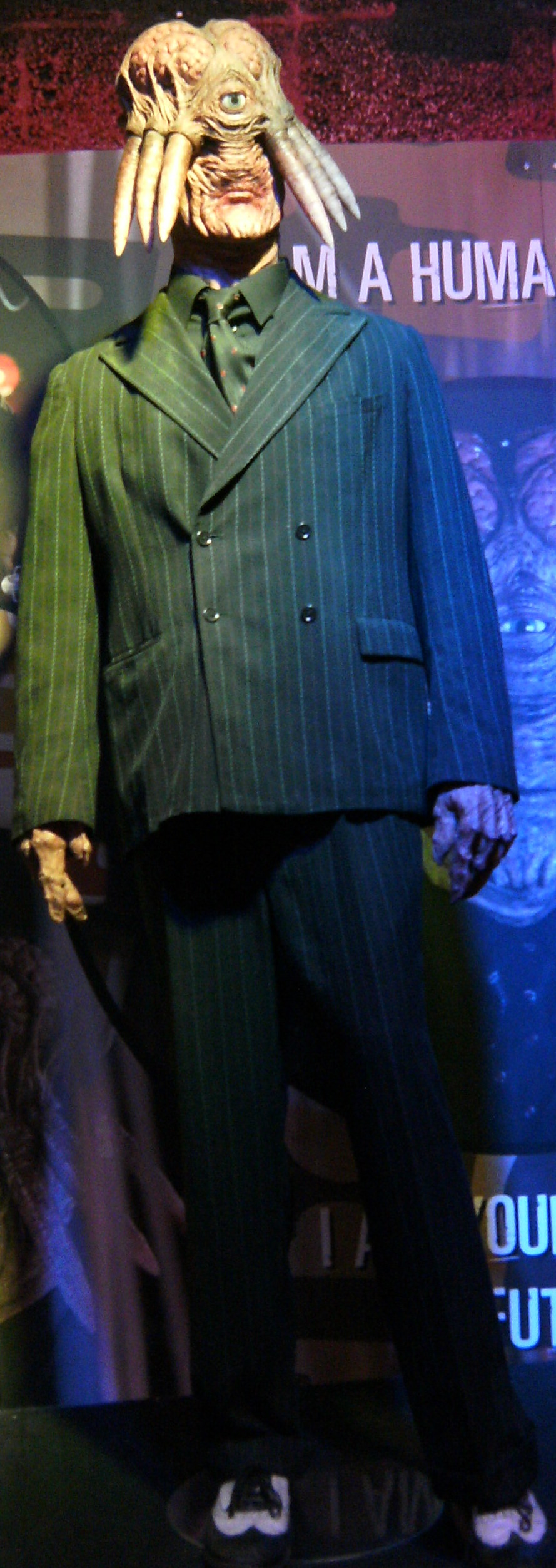
Dalek Sec (left) and the Dalek Sec-Human Hybrid (right) as shown on display at the Doctor Who Experience

The Daleks made a re-appearance in the 2006 two-part story "Army of Ghosts" and "Doomsday." A group of Daleks known as the Cult of Skaro were able to escape the Time War by travelling to the void between dimensions. The Cult escaped as the Cybermen from a parallel world invaded Earth, leading to a battle between the two species. The Tenth Doctor's (David Tennant) companion Mickey Smith (Noel Clarke) accidentally comes into contact with a "Genesis Ark" that the Daleks have in their possession, allowing the Cult to open it and unleash vast swarms of Daleks from within. The Daleks from the Ark are later sent back to the void by the Doctor and Rose, though the Cult escapes via time travel. They re-appear in the subsequent series in the two part episode "Daleks in Manhattan" and "Evolution of the Daleks", which depicts the species' leader, Sec, fusing with a human to attempt to evolve the Dalek species and allow them to survive. Sec begins to gain concepts such as morality and empathy, leading to the other Cult members rebelling against him and creating an army of Dalek-human hybrids that are pure Dalek in nature. Sec sacrifices himself to save the Doctor, and two other Cult members, Thay and Jast, are destroyed. Caan, the last member, commits genocide on the hybrids and escapes through time travel.

The Daleks re-appear in 2008 two-part story "The Stolen Earth" and "Journey's End". The story reveals that Caan was able to time travel into the Time War, where he rescued Davros moments before his death. This drove Caan insane, but allowed Davros to begin recreating the Daleks. The Daleks, rebuilt, kidnapped planets from throughout the universe, attempting to create a "reality bomb" to destroy all non-Dalek life in the universe. One of the planets kidnapped is the Earth, resulting in many allies of the Doctor working together to stop the Daleks' plan. Due to Time Lord DNA being mixed into companion Donna Noble (Catherine Tate) after Davros electrocuted her, she is imbued with a Time Lord-level intellect, allowing her and a copy of the Tenth Doctor to destroy the Daleks' fleets and return the kidnapped planets home.

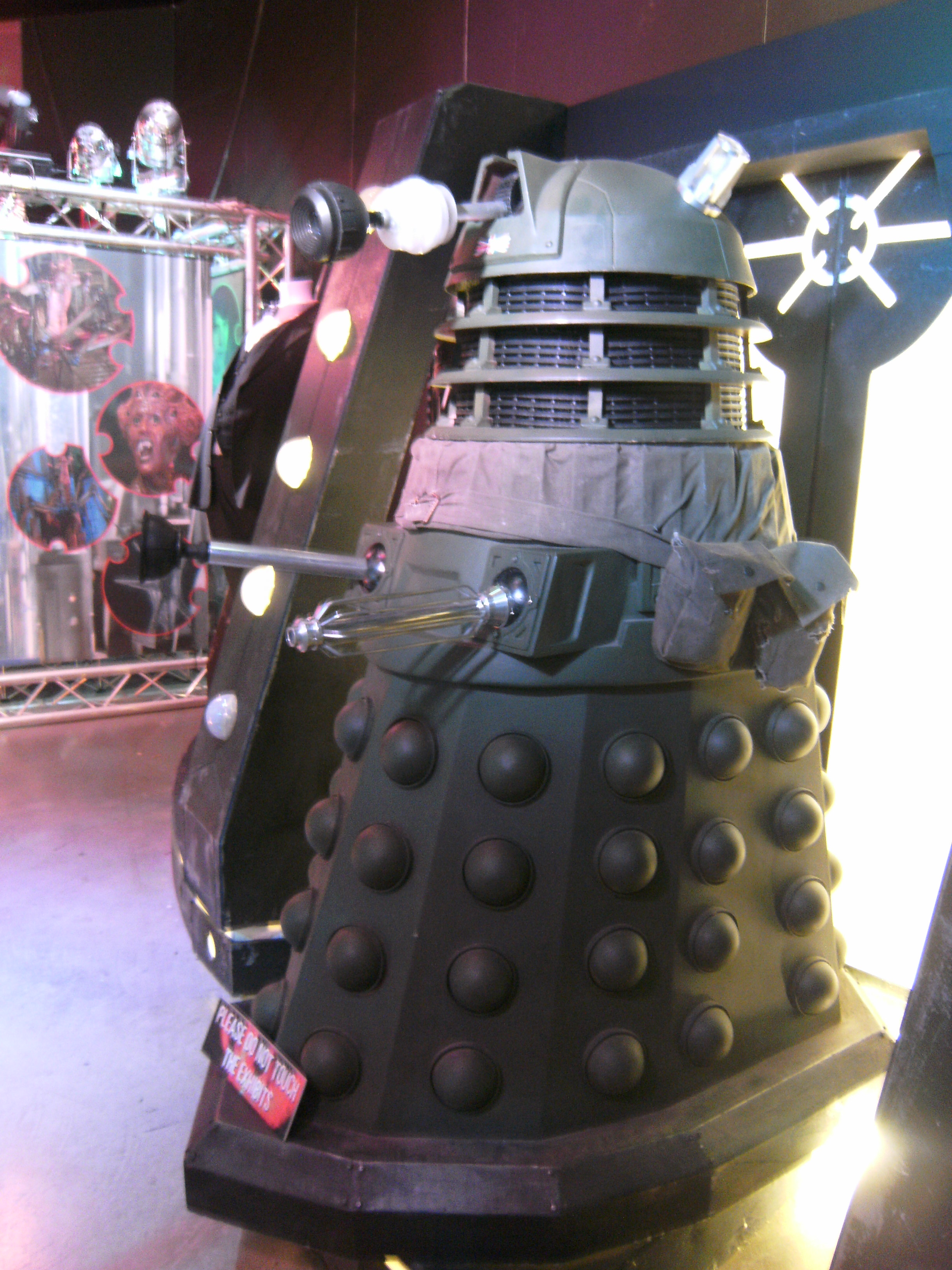
A Dalek casing as it appears disguised as one of Bracewell's creations, dubbed "Ironsides", on display at a Doctor Who exhibition

The 2010 episode "Victory of the Daleks" revealed that a single Dalek ship was able to survive the destruction of the fleet. The three surviving Daleks pretend to be creations of a scientist named Bracewell (Bill Patterson), and act as servants. The Daleks had procured a device known as a progenitor, which could be used to recreate the Daleks, but due to Davros's DNA being used to create them, the progenitor did not recognise them as "pure" Daleks. The device is activated after the Eleventh Doctor (Matt Smith) confirms the Daleks' identity to the progenitor, which creates a "New Paradigm" of Daleks, who exterminate their old counterparts and threaten to blow up the Earth using Bracewell, revealed to be a robot, if the Doctor does not let them leave. The Doctor acquiesces and disarms Bracewell, but at the cost of the Daleks escaping into the universe to rebuild their empire. The Daleks re-appeared in the later 2010 episode, "The Pandorica Opens", where they are among the many species who have allied together to imprison the Eleventh Doctor inside a prison known as the Pandorica. After all of the members of the alliance are wiped from existence, a Dalek is inadvertently revived by the opening of the Pandorica in the story's second part, "The Big Bang" (2010). Being petrified and made of stone, it mortally wounds the Doctor before being killed by his companion River Song (Alex Kingston).

The Daleks appeared in the 2012 episode "Asylum of the Daleks". The Daleks kidnap the Doctor, having rebuilt their empire, and make him enter a planet designed to imprison insane Daleks for the purpose of destroying it. The Doctor meets a girl named Oswin (Jenna Coleman), who is revealed to have been turned into a Dalek after her ship crashed on the surface. She helps the Doctor with disabling the planet's forcefields, allowing the Daleks to destroy the planet, and additionally erases the Daleks' memories of the Doctor. The Daleks appeared in the 2013 anniversary special "The Day of the Doctor", which depicts them fighting in the Time War. Despite the Doctor changing history in order to save their home planet of Gallifrey and the Time Lords, the Daleks were still destroyed in their own crossfire. The Daleks reappear the 2013 Christmas special "The Time of the Doctor". In the episode, the Time Lords' message that is broadcast throughout the universe results in the Daleks, among other species, attempting to stop them from returning by waging siege on the planet Trenzalore. They recover their memories via harvesting memories of the Doctor from the Church of the Papal Mainframe, though the Doctor eventually destroys the invading Dalek fleet while regenerating.

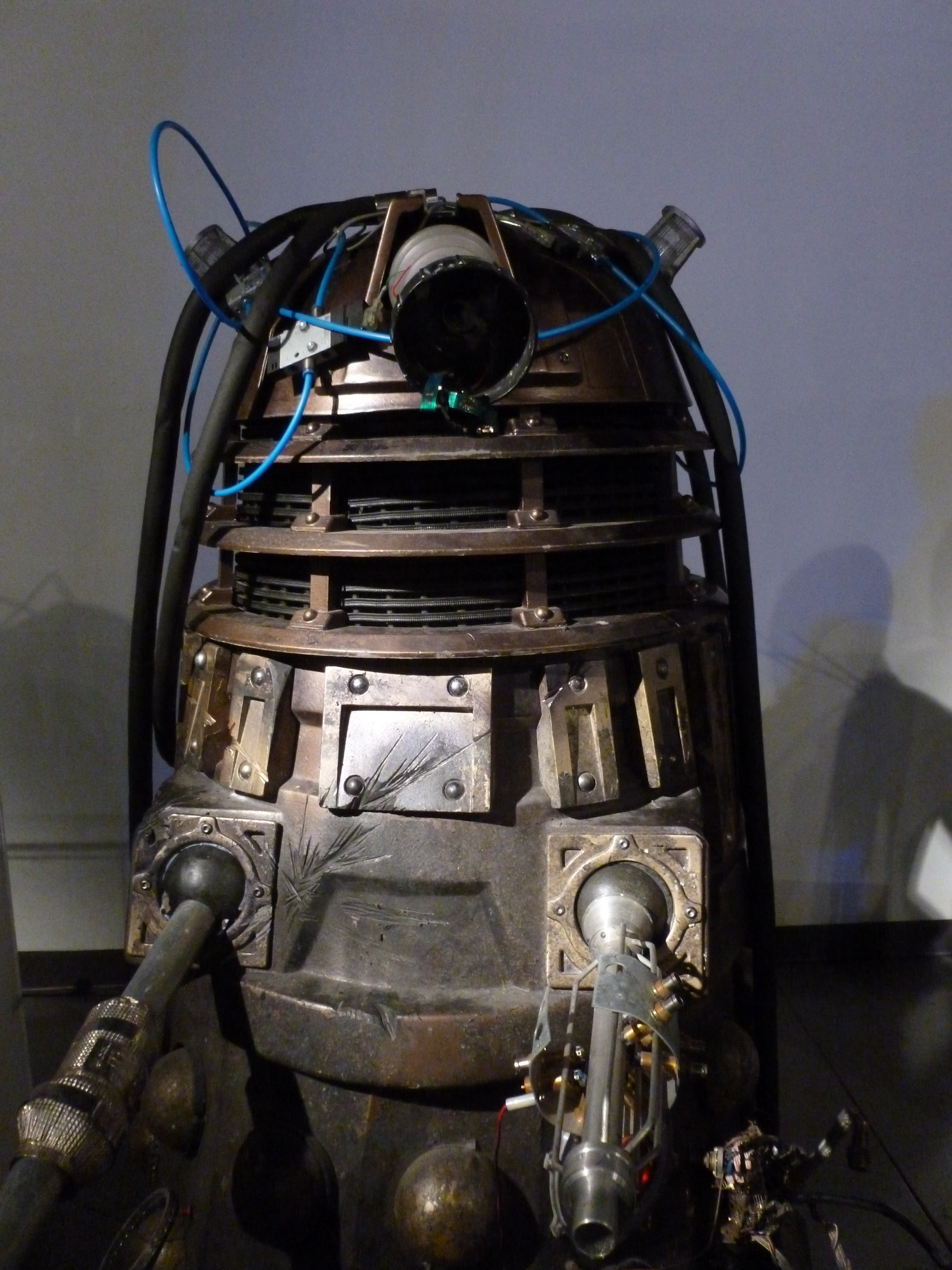
Rusty's damaged casing as it appears at the Doctor Who Experience

The 2014 episode "Into the Dalek" depicted a Dalek, nicknamed "Rusty", suffering a mechanical fault, resulting in it becoming "good". Ordered by a human military unit, the Twelfth Doctor (Peter Capaldi) shrunk inside of the Dalek's casing to repair it and allow it to aid the humans. The repairs caused it to revert to its old programming, and it contacted the other Daleks to attack the humans. The Doctor attempted to reignite the Dalek's goodness, only to instead give it a bloodlust for other Daleks. Rusty left once the Daleks were dispatched. The Daleks re-appeared in the 2015 two-part story "The Magician's Apprentice" and "The Witch's Familiar". Their creator, Davros, is on the verge of death, and the Daleks accompany him on the rebuilt Skaro. Davros is able to trick the Doctor into giving him regeneration energy, which Davros harnesses and gives to the Daleks. The Daleks are destroyed by decomposing Daleks present in the sewers of Skaro, who were granted new life by the regeneration energy. Following a cameo by a Dalek in 2017 episode "The Pilot", Rusty would re-appear in the 2017 Christmas special "Twice Upon a Time", where the Doctor uses him to access information regarding an alien being known as the Testimony.

2019 episode "Resolution" depicted a Reconnaissance Dalek, stated to be among the first Daleks to have left Skaro. It is defeated on Earth in the ancient past, but reforms and possesses a police officer named Lin. Using Lin's body, the Dalek reconstructs a makeshift casing for itself, which it uses in an attempt to summon the Dalek battle fleet. The Thirteenth Doctor (Jodie Whittaker) destroys the casing, and is able to trick the Dalek into falling into a supernova. This Dalek's casing is later recovered during the 2021 episode "Revolution of the Daleks", where its DNA is used to clone new Daleks to inhabit "Security Drones". These Daleks go rogue and end up in a civil war with the "pure" Daleks, who destroy the Security Drones. The Doctor defeats the "pure" Daleks by trapping them in a spare TARDIS and sending them to the void between dimensions.

The Daleks re-appeared throughout 2021's Doctor Who: Flux, where they are shown taking advantage of the devastation caused by a massive anti-matter cloud known as the Flux, which destroys much of the known universe. When the Flux returns, they accept an offer from the Sontarans for safety from the Flux, but are deceived and destroyed by the Sontarans. The Daleks subsequently appear in 2022 episode "Eve of the Daleks", where a squad of Executioner Daleks, equipped with gatling gun-like weapons, seek revenge against the Doctor for letting the bulk of their fleets die to the Flux. Trapped in a time loop, the Doctor and her allies are killed many times by the Daleks, but they are able to thwart the Daleks just before the time loop runs out. They also appear in 2022's "The Power of the Doctor", where they aid the Master in his plan to finally defeat the Doctor.

The Daleks appeared in the 2023 Children in Need sketch "Destination: Skaro", which depicts Davros and a Kaled named Mr. Castavillian (Mawaan Rizwan) discussing the creation of Davros's travel machines prior to the events of Genesis of the Daleks. The Fourteenth Doctor's (David Tennant) TARDIS crash-landing accidentally causes the Dalek's manipulator arm to break, and the Doctor accidentally gives Castavillian the idea for the Daleks' name, the usage of the phrase "Exterminate", and the plunger-like arm present on the Daleks' design, before leaving.

=== Other appearances ===
Following the first two Dalek serials, many different books and comic strips based on the Daleks were released. These spin-off materials greatly expanded the Dalek lore, which was used in the hopes of expanding the Daleks' popularity and creating new opportunities for their usage. These stories predominantly focused on the Daleks' conflicts with humans in the far future, though depicted many other events as well, such as documenting the creation and history of the Daleks, or by showing Dalek interference in events throughout history. This early media introduced several ideas that would recur in later media include the concept of a Dalek Emperor, as well as the idea of Daleks flying, though featured several differences from the Daleks personality wise from later media. Film adaptations of the first two Dalek serials, Dr. Who and the Daleks and Daleks' Invasion Earth 2150 A.D., were produced, following largely similar plots to the originals, though with slight differences in the plot.

Having previously featured in comics in TV Comic, the Doctor Who comic shifted to Countdown for TV Action!. Shortly after the Daleks' re-appearance in Day of the Daleks, they appeared in several comics in Countdown. Following the absorption of TV Action into TV Comic in 1973, the Daleks appeared in that comic in a strip made to tie in with Death to the Daleks. TV Comic would continue producing strips for the next three years featuring the Daleks, though these appearances primarily relied on reprints of older Dalek strips. The Daleks were featured in the 1974 stage play Doctor Who and the Daleks in the Seven Keys to Doomsday, where they attempted to regain control of seven components of an all-powerful crystal.

Due to the increasing popularity of the show under the tenure of Jon Pertwee and Tom Baker as the leads, new waves of tie-in merchandise were produced, with much of it featuring the Daleks. This included toys, games, and other miscellaneous merchandise, such as tea-drinkers. By 1979, TV Comic ceased production of the Doctor Who comic strips, with strips shifting to Doctor Who Magazine, which would feature the Daleks in various capacities following the shift, including in a back-up strip where they faced off against Abslom Daak, a "Dalek killer" who sought to kill as many Daleks as possible. After Baker's departure from the series, the Daleks would not be seen in the comics again for another decade. Novelisations, tie-in books, and audio productions of the Daleks' stories were released throughout the 70s.

Another stage play, titled The Ultimate Adventure, was produced, releasing in 1989, which again featured the Daleks. The Daleks began to re-appear in comic adaptations, and would go on to re-appear in strips throughout the 90s and early 2000s. This included a new adaptation of the original 1960s TV Comic Dalek strips. The Daleks additionally appeared in various computer games, such as Dalek Attack and Doctor Who: Destiny of the Doctors. Books produced by BBC Books were produced from 1997 onward, depicting various Dalek adventures, including War of the Daleks, which attempted to result continuity errors within the Daleks' canon, and Legacy of the Daleks, which acted as a sequel to The Dalek Invasion of Earth. The Daleks would appear in the charity spoof The Curse of Fatal Death. The Daleks would also appear in audio productions made by Big Finish Productions starting from 1999 onwards. They appeared in a large variety of stories, including a spin-off titled Dalek Empire and a spin-off focusing on their creator, I, Davros. One of these audio dramas, 2003's Jubilee, would serve as inspiration for the episode "Dalek". The Daleks also appeared in a novella titled The Dalek Factor in 2004.

Following the series' revival in 2005, Dalek spin-off content continued being produced. A computer game titled The Last Dalek put the player in control of the Dalek from the episode "Dalek" as it attempted to escape Van Statten's vault. A spin-off novel, titled I am a Dalek, was released in 2006, set after the events of "The Parting of the Ways". Further stories and novels were produced throughout the 2000s featuring the Daleks. To tie-in to the revived series, further waves of merchandise were produced, including the trading card series Doctor Who – Battles in Time, toys, clothes, and various miscellaneous merchandise. Following the Daleks' redesign in 2010, more new merchandise was produced, including new books and appearances in the video game Doctor Who: Evacuation Earth and the stage show Doctor Who Live. Subsequent books, audio dramas, video games, toys, and other media were released throughout the 2010s and 2020s.

The Daleks have cameoed in several other pieces of media, such as Mr. Bean, The Vicar of Dibley, and It's a Sin. The Daleks made a cameo appearance in the 2003 film Looney Tunes: Back in Action. The Daleks appear in several pieces of Lego media. They appear in a Doctor Who-themed Lego set, in the crossover toys-to-life video game Lego Dimensions, and in The Lego Batman Movie. The Daleks have made cameos in other video games, such as Eve Online and Fall Guys. In 2024, the Daleks made an appearance in a Doctor Who-themed expansion of Magic: The Gathering.

== Conception and design ==
=== Creation and The Daleks ===
Writer Terry Nation, between jobs, wrote the 1963 serial The Daleks for the series. The Head of Drama at the BBC, Sydney Newman, initially disliked the idea of the Daleks, believing that Doctor Who should have no aliens or monsters; Newman felt that a programme should have a "balance between action and realism" in order to draw people's attention, and felt that alien creatures would detract from that. The production team, however, had no other stories ready to be made, which resulted in the Daleks' debut serial, The Daleks, being produced. As the series was meant to be educational, the serial's inclusion in the series was justified as being used to educate about nuclear war and its consequences to children.

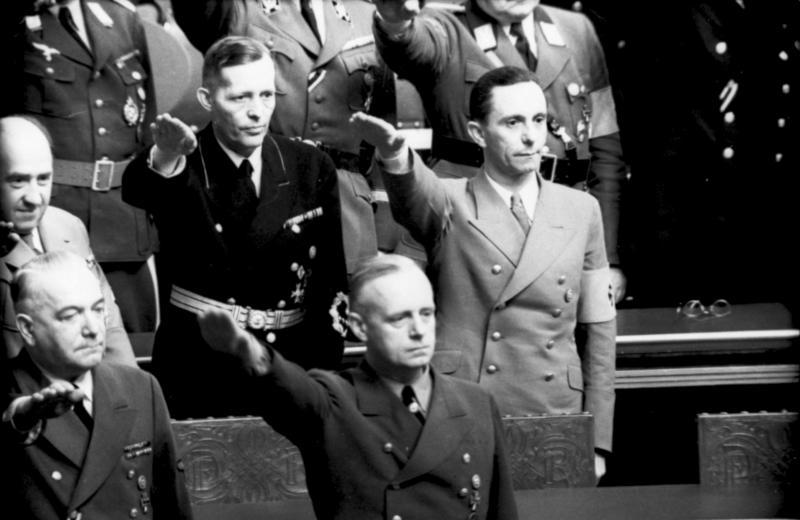
Terry Nation drew inspiration from the Nazis in depicting the Daleks as faceless and jingoistic racial supremacists.

Nation's design inspiration for the Daleks came from watching a dance troupe on television, as their long skirts gave the impression that they glided across the stage. Wishing to create an alien creature that did not look like a "man in a suit", Terry Nation stated in his script for the first Dalek serial that they should have no legs. Though initial plans had the Daleks uniting with another race to combat a larger threat, Nation drew on the cultural memory of the Nazi Party and World War II for the Daleks' design, and the Daleks quickly evolved to become villains. Aspects of the Daleks' personality, such as their extreme xenophobia, staccato voices, and goals of "genetic purity", were adapted from or based on Nazi ideologies and motivations. David Whitaker, the script editor, also enforced the Daleks' genocidal nature by removing ambiguity in the original serials' script of who was an aggressor in the war, making the Daleks appear to more directly be evil creatures. Nation understood that the Daleks' status as pure evil beings would make them undesirable for American companies as he wished to branch out the Daleks' appearances, and thus made the Daleks entirely driven by domination in order to give the species greater depth. He emphasised their evil to show how it could only be overcome when people are working together to stop it, idealised by the Thals in the Daleks' debut serial. The Daleks thus symbolised "the dangers of prejudice and singlemindedness".

"Standing in a half circle in front of them are four hideous machine like creatures. They are legless, moving on a round base. They have no human features. A lens on a flexible shaft acts as an eye. Arms with mechanical grips for hands."

— Terry Nation's script directions for the Daleks' design,

The Daleks' physical designs were created by the BBC designer Raymond Cusick. Ridley Scott, at the time working for the BBC, was originally slated to design the Daleks, but he left to work for another company before production began. As a result, Cusick took over in Scott's stead. Cusick, believing that the Daleks had evolved into creatures that were no more than brains, sought to create a design that made sure that viewers never saw how the Dalek moved. Originally, more of the mutant inside of the Dalek casing was planned to be shown, but this was scrapped for both pricing issues and concerns the mutant would be too terrifying. In the final serial, the mutant was only seen briefly as a jelly-like substance.

Cusick designed the Daleks based on Terry Nation's script directions. Cusick decided quickly that the Daleks' casings had to be physical props, as mechanical props would be prone to technical failures, with the design constructed so a human could fit inside the prop. Cusick's first design was a tubular design that had a single pincer arm; this was rejected on cost grounds. It was decided to redesign the creatures so an actor could be seated inside the Dalek prop. The second design was more conical and shape and featured two pincer arms; due to price concerns regarding the pincers, it was decided the arms would instead use a suction cup. This resulted in a sink plunger being used for one of the Daleks' manipulator arms. Cusick then decided to design the costume so it could fit around a tricycle. This design had both the suction cup arm and a new "death ray" to its side, as well as a section covered in gauze that would allow operators to see out of the prop. The casing now featured an eye stalk, as well as being constructed in such a way that the prop itself could be opened. Due to issues with being unable to identify which Daleks were speaking, lights were added to the top of the Daleks, which flashed when a specific Dalek spoke. This design was made to be as simple as possible so as little as possible would go wrong during filming.

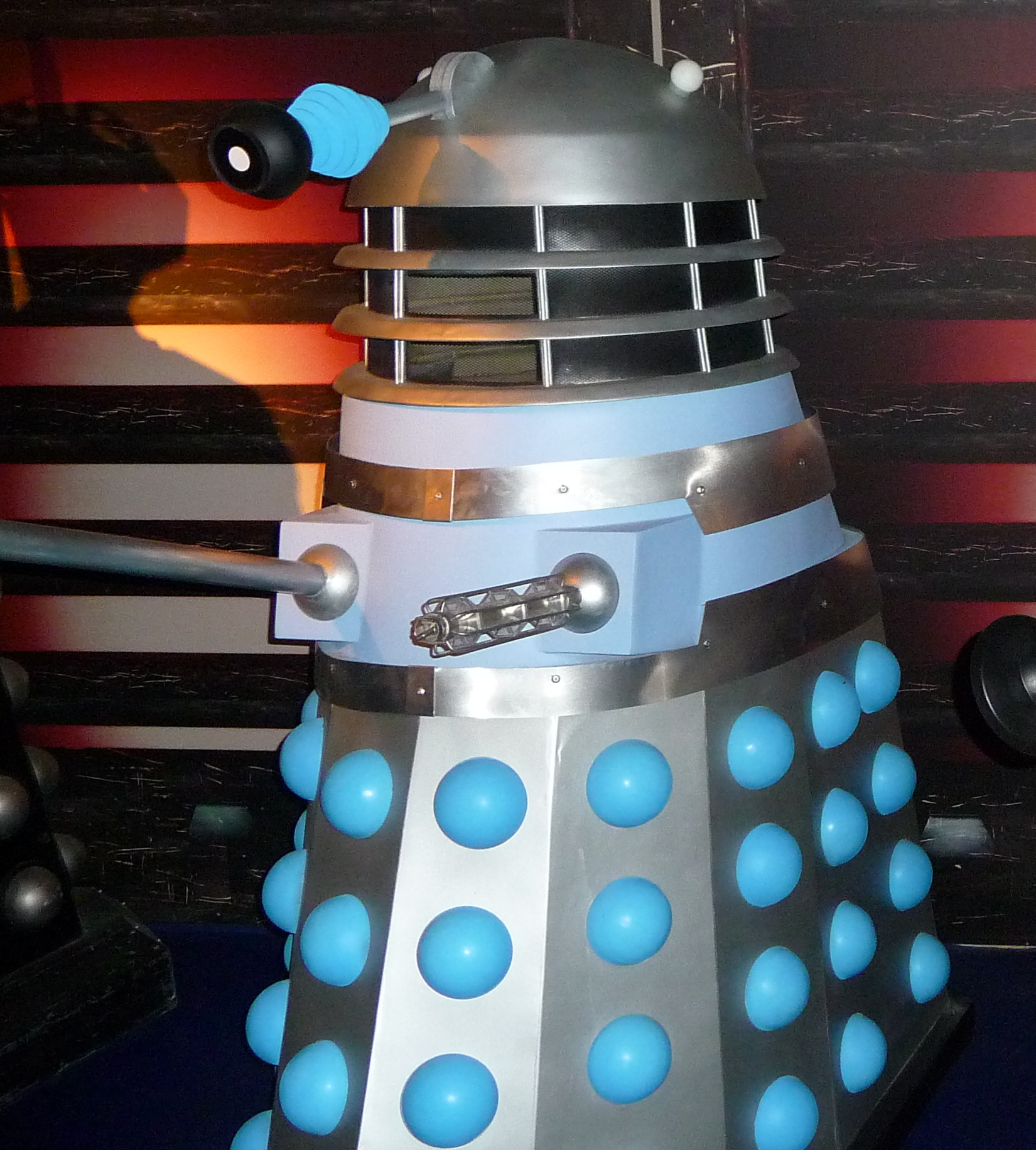
A model of the original Dalek casing design, on display at the Doctor Who Experience

Bernard Wilkie and Jack Kine, members of the visual effects department, worked together with Cusick to construct a rough model for the Daleks, using various parts present around the BBC Television Centre. While discussing with model maker Bill Roberts, Cusick used a pepper pot to demonstrate the Daleks' movements to him, stating that there had to be no visible means of human-like movement. This led to a rumour that Cusick had based the Daleks' design on a pepper pot, which Cusick later debunked. Cusick wanted a skirt-like bottom for the Daleks made of fibreglass, but was told it was too expensive. The Daleks were thus constructed with plywood in mind but Cusick later discovered that the prop had been constructed out of fibreglass regardless. Hemispherical bumps were added to the bottom, which Cusick hoped to have flash when the Daleks got overly emotional, but this was scrapped. Other elements that had to be dropped were the idea of the Dalek's arm-like extensions being able to rotate, as well as the idea of a tricycle fitting inside the props, as the Dalek prop was unable to fit one inside. The props were created quickly, being "speedily developed". Cusick also helped with designing the Daleks' home planet, Skaro, in its initial appearances.

The original Dalek model resembled how they would look throughout the series, albeit with a metal band around their centre area. The prop was built in two pieces: a lower and upper section. Operators would sit on the lower section, and the upper section would be inserted on top. The operators would look out of the Dalek costume through the cylindrical section below the Dalek's dome, with a mesh in the cylindrical section preventing the audience from seeing the operator's face. Though the Daleks have wheels on their base, they are manually controlled within by their operators. Operators also had to learn the script in order to time the flashing of the Daleks' headlights with the delivery of the Daleks' voice actors.

=== Further 1960s productions ===
The Daleks had proved unexpectedly popular for the BBC; they sought to capitalise on the Daleks as soon as possible, with a sequel serial being commissioned for 1964. A scenario, "Daleks threaten Earth", was selected out of a desire to make a serial that was a greater spectacle for viewers than the first Dalek serial. Nation would return to write this serial, which would become The Dalek Invasion of Earth. The Dalek casings were re-used from the prior serial and re-furbished, with new eyestalks being added. Due to the Daleks being unable to leave their cities in their debut serial, a dish was added on to the back of the props, done to explain in-universe how the Daleks were now able to leave their cities. A larger base was added to the bottom of the Dalek to allow for easier movement on location. Though Terry Nation initially conceived the Daleks as being connected through a hivemind of brains, the need for a "Supreme" Dalek became necessary as a form of leadership. Nation introduced an in-universe hierarchy for the Daleks in The Dalek Invasion of Earth, with the Daleks now being led by an all-black Supreme Dalek.

Nation tried branching the Daleks out in order to capitalise on their popularity. Nation sold the film rights of the Daleks to writer Milton Subotsky. Subotsky worked with Amicus Productions for the films. Subotsky and Amicus produced, Dr. Who and the Daleks, an adaptation of the Daleks' debut serial. This was followed by the development of a sequel, Daleks' Invasion Earth 2150 A.D.. For the film adaptations of both of these serials, the Daleks were given a standard blue colour, with a red colour to indicate a second in command and a black and gold colour scheme for the Daleks' leader. The Daleks themselves were redesigned, gaining a bulkier design with a claw-like extension replacing the plunger-like arm. Fire extinguishers were used to simulate the Daleks' guns firing. The designs and props of the versions from the films would later be re-used for the television series.

Following a brief cameo by the Daleks in the 1965 serial The Space Museum, they appeared again in the subsequent serial, The Chase. This serial was commissioned as a result of the Daleks' continued popularity, with the serial being more expensive than others being produced at the time. Cusick's return as a designer for The Chase saw a change to the design introduced in The Dalek Invasion of Earth, with the Daleks' base being returned to their previous size, while the back dish was removed. He created the concept of "solar paneled slats" which would remain on the "shoulder" area of the Daleks. Several Daleks from the Amicus films were loaned to the BBC for usage in these serials, though were largely kept to the background to swell the Daleks' numbers.

Due to 1964 serial Planet of Giants having one of its episodes cut mid-development, an extra episode was allotted to the production team. Due to being unable to be put into the standard four or six-part serial format, it was eventually decided to make it a standalone episode that served as a "cutaway trailer" for the subsequent Dalek serial: The Daleks' Master Plan. This single episode, dubbed "Mission to the Unknown", served to set up elements and characters who would be present in The Daleks' Master Plan. Additionally, Nation wished to branch the Daleks out as part of their own spin-off series, following the then-imminent release of the 1960s Dalek films, resulting in this episode being used to help test a hypothetical format for such a series. Several Dalek props were re-used for the serial, including one prop which was re-painted to serve as this serial's Supreme Dalek. Due to the popularity of the Daleks, the originally six-part Master Plan was upped to twelve parts, meant to be the largest ever Dalek story put to air.

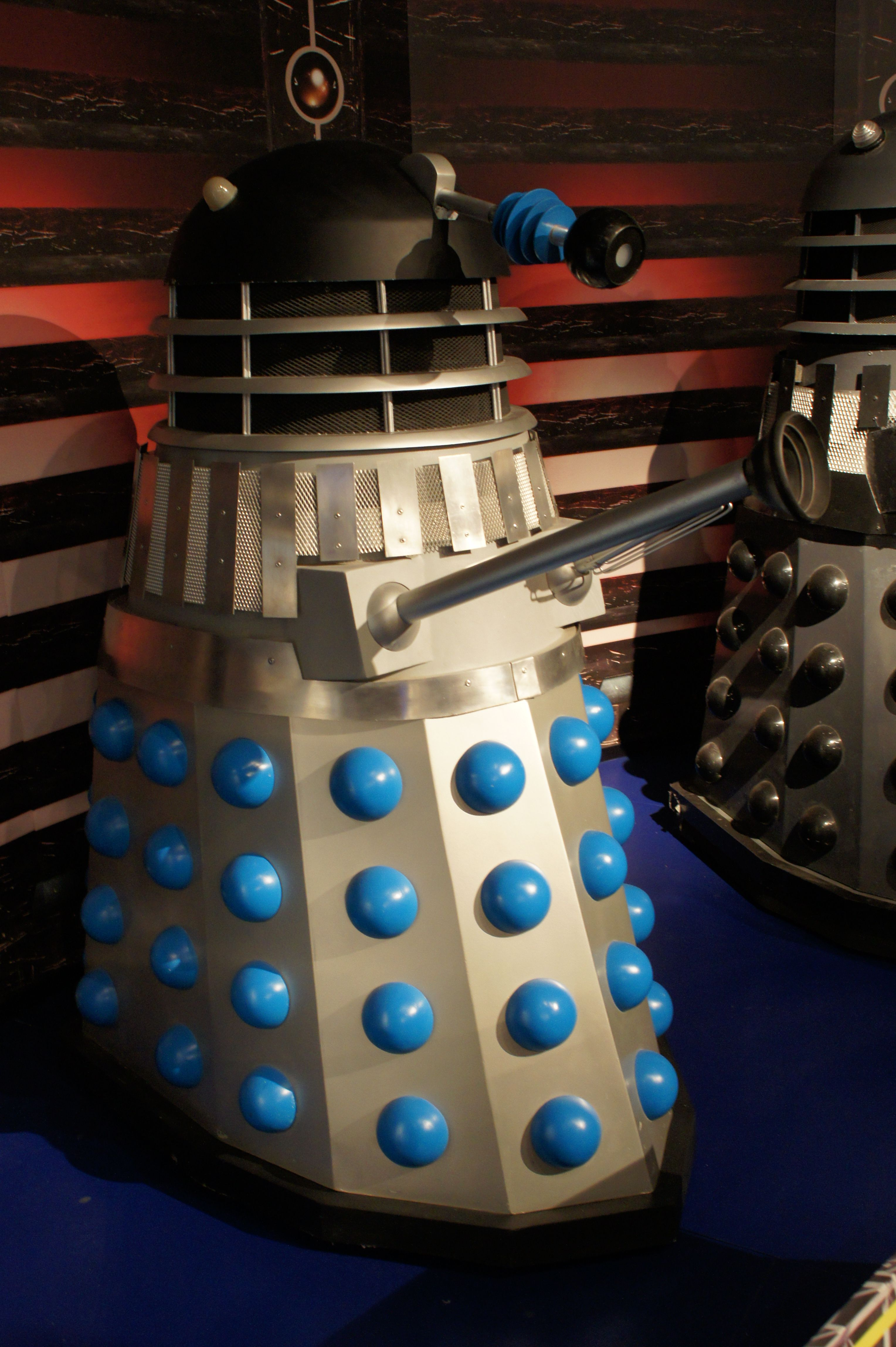
A Dalek casing as it appears in the 1967 serial The Evil of the Daleks, on display at the Doctor Who Experience.

The Daleks were brought back for the 1966 serial The Power of the Daleks in order to bridge the gap between the departure of William Hartnell as the First Doctor and Patrick Troughton as the Second Doctor. Producer Innes Lloyd hoped the Daleks' return would boost ratings and ease the transition between Doctors. Nation did not return to write this serial, unlike prior Dalek serials, and writers David Whitaker and Dennis Spooner were brought on to write the script. Though many Dalek props were re-used for the serial, a scene in which Daleks were being mass-produced utilised many toy Daleks produced as merchandise. Other scenes used cardboard cutouts and a rotating group of three Daleks to simulate there being more Daleks than the number of casings actually in storage.

The BBC had discussed with Nation the idea of a Dalek spin-off television series, though decided later the idea was unlikely to succeed. A large, golden, dome-headed Emperor was depicted in early spin-off material for the series, and the writer of the 1967 serial The Evil of the Daleks, David Whitaker, elected to depict the Emperor on-screen, though this Emperor was immobile, using a variant of the standard Dalek casing. Because Nation wanted to bring the Dalek spin-off pitch to America, the serial was structured so that if the Daleks needed to be written out, they could be written out during the end of the serial. The Daleks were seemingly destroyed in a civil war in the serial, and they subsequently went on break, not re-appearing in an episode until 1972's Day of the Daleks. Other monsters, such as the Cybermen, Ice Warriors, and Yeti, would serve as recurring antagonists in an attempt to fill the gap left by the Daleks. Though there was a plan for the Daleks to appear in a serial alongside the Cybermen, these plans were given a veto by Nation, who had right of first refusal on future Dalek serials.

=== 1970s ===
After years of discussion, negotiations for the Dalek spin-off series eventually fell through. Producers Terrance Dicks and Barry Letts, in April 1972, began to consider bringing the Daleks back due to continued demand from viewers, as well as from the BBC's managing director Huw Wheldon. Though they did not like bringing back old enemies and had held the Daleks in reserve as the pair assessed the Daleks' popularity, the pair decided to bring them back in 1972's Day of the Daleks. Though Nation was busy writing television series in the United States, he approved their return so long as he received fees for the Daleks' usage in the serial. As the 1972 series had no unique "gimmick" that started it off, the pair decided to shift the Daleks to the front of the season, inserting them into writer Louis Marks's original plan for the serial. Only three Dalek props that remained in storage were deemed usable for the serial. Two were painted grey for their appearance, while the third was painted gold and served as the Dalek leader. The Dalek props were also overall refurbished for the serials after years of disuse.

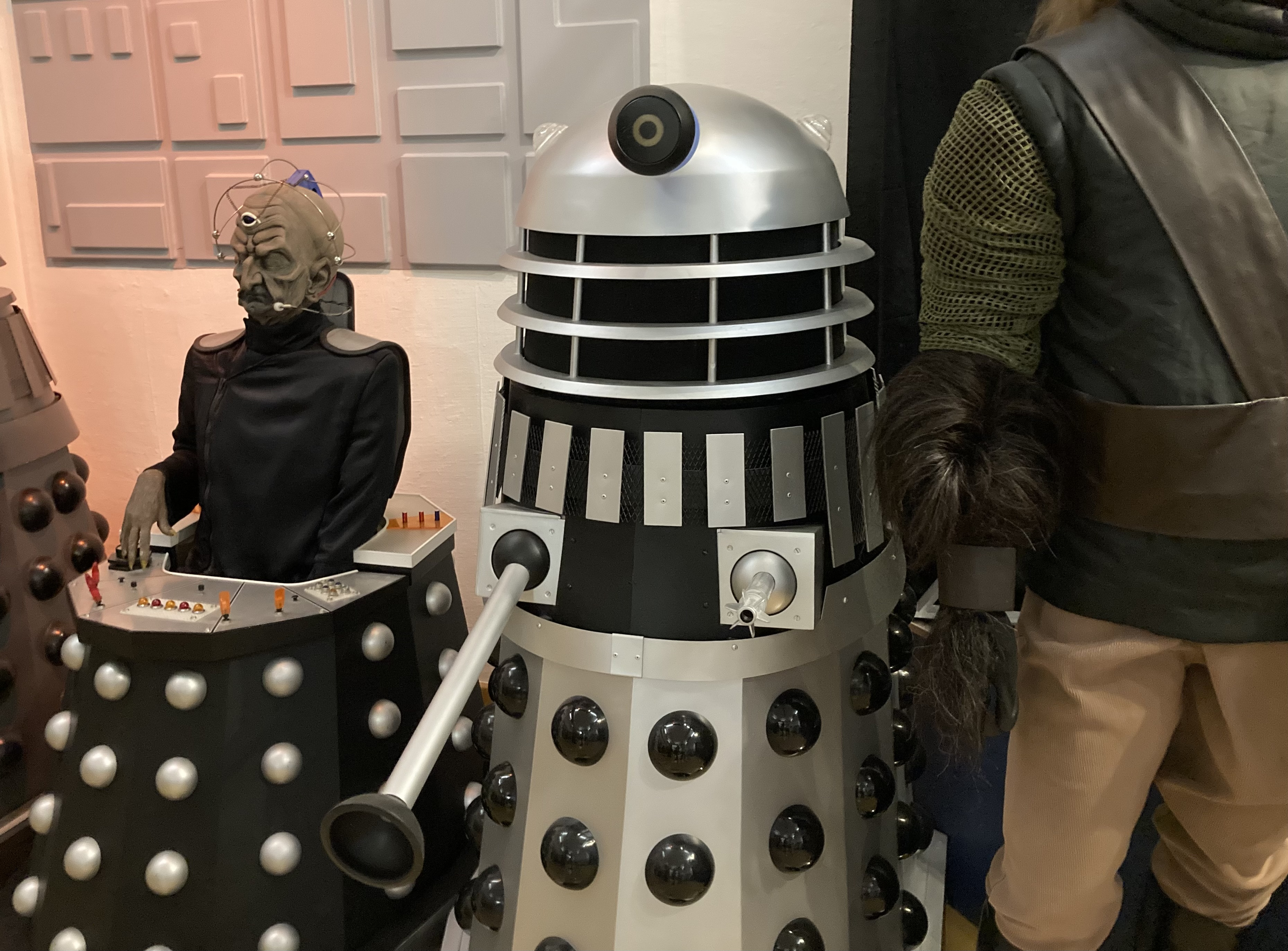
A Dalek casing as it appears in the 1974 serial Death to the Daleks, on display at the "Adventures in Time and Space" exhibition.

As part of later plans for the series' tenth anniversary, one twelve part serial was planned, akin to The Daleks' Master Plan. This was scrapped, however, when Dicks and Letts felt that audiences would not follow along with a plot for that long. Thus, the serial was split into two serials with independent production teams: Frontier in Space and Planet of the Daleks, with both serials airing in 1973. The Daleks would cameo at the end of Frontier in Space, leading directly into the subsequent Dalek story. Nation would return to write Planet of the Daleks for the first time since the mid-1960s. Planet pays homage to many past Dalek stories, utilising several past plot elements, most notably bringing back the Thals after their debut appearance. For the first time since 1964, new props were constructed for the Daleks, though these were of lower quality than the 60s props and largely kept to the background. The three props that featured in Day of the Daleks featured most prominently in the episode. Several Dalek toys and models were used for group shots and scenes were Daleks were destroyed. Another Dalek Supreme appeared in the serial, utilising an altered prop from the 1960s Dalek films. It sported a gold and black colour scheme.

Letts sought to schedule further Dalek serials in the middle of the show's seasons, as they provided a large ratings boost whenever they returned. The show's 1974 season featured the Daleks in the serial Death to the Daleks. The serial featured a gimmick in which the Daleks could not use their usual technology, resulting in an explanation that Daleks moved their casings using psychic powers. Instead of their usual blaster, their weapons were swapped out for manual machine gun-esque weapons which fired rounds of ammunition. The Dalek casings were repainted a silver colour to harken back to the Daleks' original 1960s colour scheme. The same three main Dalek props were re-used from the prior serial, as were the lower quality Dalek models that were used in order to boost the number of Daleks on-screen. A pellet-firing gun was constructed and installed into the props to simulate the manual weapons the Daleks used in the serial.

Following Death to the Daleks, Nation began to plan another Dalek serial. Nation's initial script was considered too repetitive compared to prior Dalek serials and re-treaded several pre-existing concepts. Letts suggested a serial that explored the origins of the Daleks, as it was something the show had yet to explore; Nation was enthusiastic about the concept. The same Dalek casing props from prior serials were re-used, though repainted to their colour scheme from Planet of the Daleks. The Daleks' Nazi origins were leaned into in the serial, with the Kaleds, the species that would later mutate into the Daleks, wearing Iron Crosses and performing Nazi salutes.

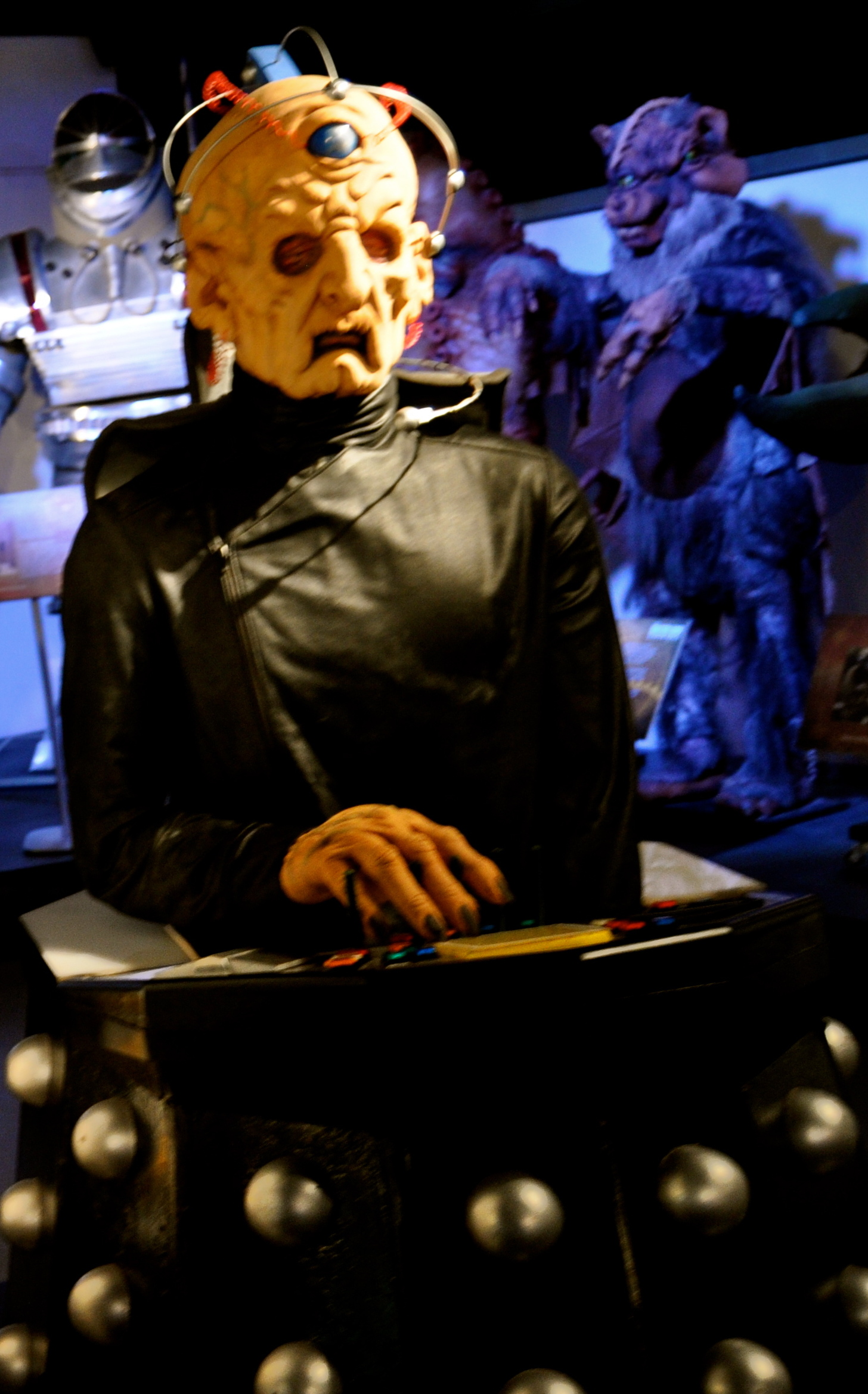
Davros as he appears during the show's original run, on display at the Doctor Who Experience

The Daleks' origins had previously been explored in comic strips produced in the 1960s; one origin depicted the Daleks as survivors of an accidental bomb detonation, with the resulting mutants housing themselves in war machines that would become their casings, while another depicted the Daleks as the result of the human race several hundred years in the future. For the serial, these origins were altered, with the Daleks instead being created by a scientist of the Kaled race, Davros. Davros was created as an "in-between" stage between Kaled and Dalek, with Davros being able to think "in a human fashion". Davros was written in a way that he could be brought back in subsequent serials, with his apparent death scene in the serial not showing the actual moment of his demise. The popularity of Genesis has been credited with aiding in Davros making subsequent re-appearances in other Dalek stories.

Following Genesis, the Daleks would not appear on the series for another few years. Producer Graham Williams did this to avoid the Daleks becoming overexposed, but elected to bring them back for the show's 1979 season to move away from the previous season's focus on the Time Lords and their associated mythology. Nation would return to work on the serial, titled Destiny of the Daleks, which would end up being his last written story for the program. Nation sought to bring back Davros, who he felt helped vary the Daleks' dialogue. Nation created a situation— a stalemate between the Daleks and a race called the Movellans— which would justify the return of Davros. Dalek props proved problematic for usage in the serial, as the production team lacked budget to produce more props, and many of them were in terrible condition. Many hastily put together Dalek casing props were constructed, with some Daleks only having half of a model being carried around by an extra. By the end of the serial's filming, the Daleks were broken, had missing parts, and in some extreme cases, were held together by tape. Advances in the production of Dalek casings resulted in the construction of four more props for subsequent serials.

=== 1980s and 1990s ===
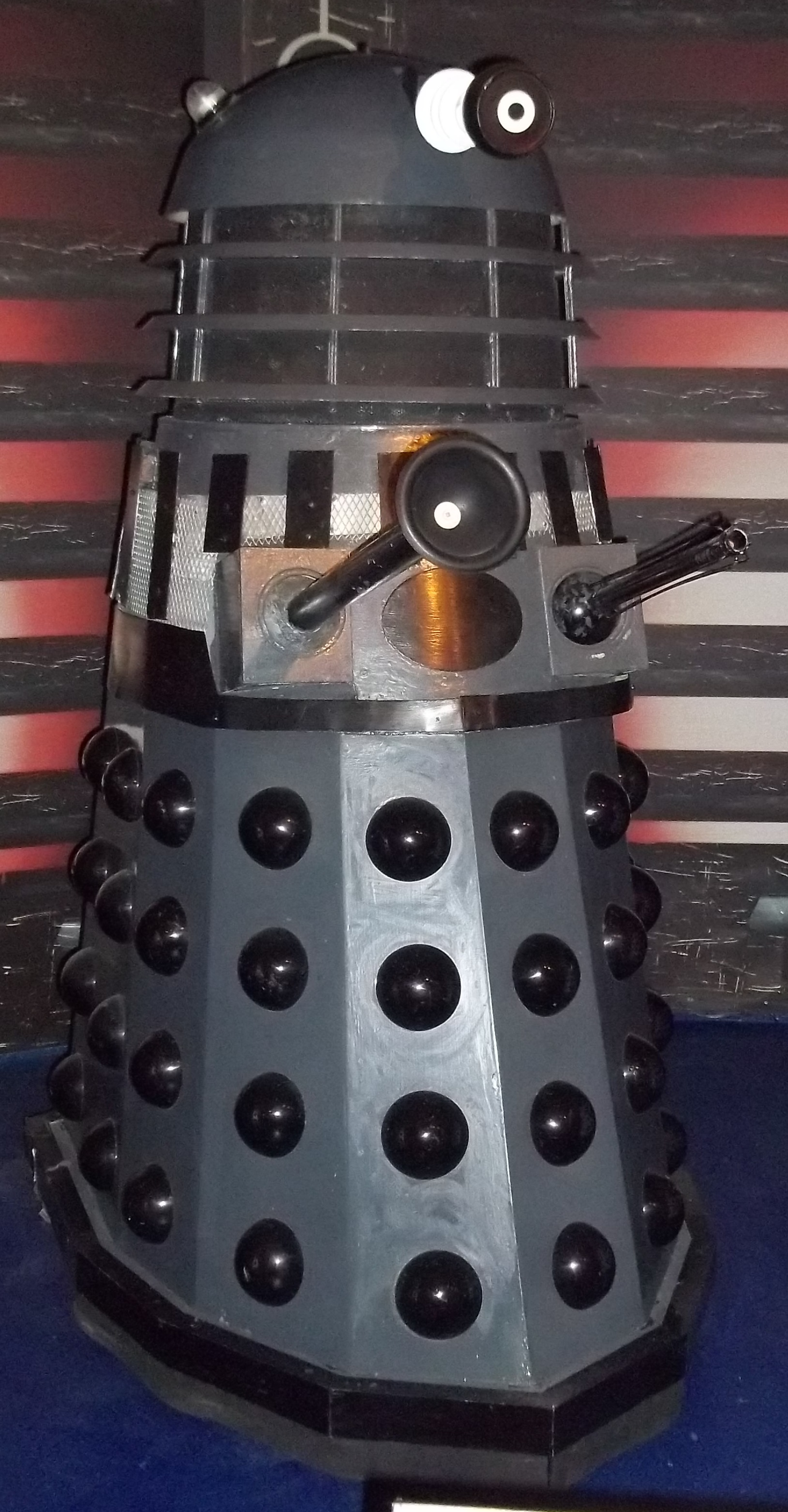
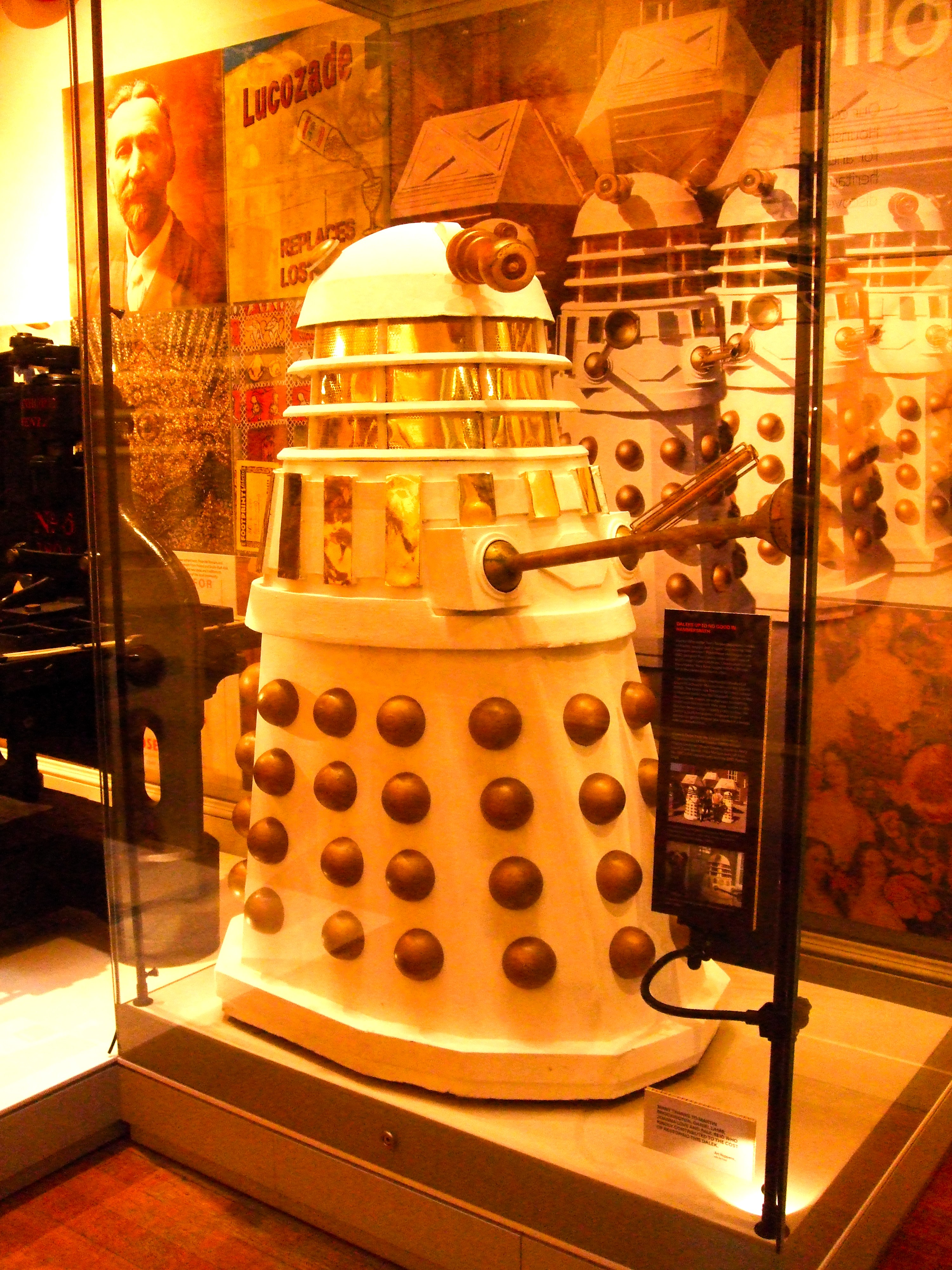
A Renegade Dalek casing (left) and an Imperial Dalek casing (right) on display at various exhibitions

1984's Resurrection of the Daleks aired towards the end of Doctor Who's twentieth anniversary season. Producer John Nathan-Turner felt it would be a good idea to close the season with an encounter between the Doctor and the Daleks, especially since he felt it would garner high ratings. Nation was initially protective of the Daleks' rights, holding negative feelings over the Daleks' role in Destiny of the Daleks. Nation and Turner were able to reach an agreement, and Eric Saward was assigned to work on the script. Saward elected to bring back Davros, feeling as though Davros was more entertaining to write than the Daleks and provided better dialogue. The serial was written to follow on from Destiny's events. Throughout the writing process, Nation supervised production and advised Saward and the team directly; he specified directly that Davros could not be killed and the Dalek Emperor, initially in the script, could not be included. Saward would write the following Dalek serial, 1985's Revelation of the Daleks, which Saward wrote while amending specific disdains he had for the prior story, feeling Revelation better handled aspects such as the tone and humor. Saward also sought to write the script to rely less on pre-existing Dalek continuity, additionally seeking to incorporate a series of unique characters as a result. Saward also included Davros once more for the same reasons he included him in Resurrection. 1985's Revelation of the Daleks introduced a new white and gold-colored Dalek casing, using new moulds for the Dalek props. These Daleks were a breakaway faction who fought in a civil war with the gun-metal Daleks present in serials in the 1970s.

Turner and script editor Andrew Cartmel, while working on developing serials for the 1988 season of the show, decided to incorporate the Daleks into the first serial of the season; Cartmel felt there needed to be a "gimmick" to highlight the start of the season, as it was the year of the show's 25th anniversary. The serial would be named Remembrance of the Daleks, and would be written by Ben Aaronovitch. Aaronovitch reviewed prior scripts and felt Dalek stories had become boring due to a lack of differentiable dialogue between members of the species. As a result, he elected to focus the serial on a newly created Dalek civil war. Aaronovitch also included Davros, with his scenes allowing for more "versatility" and emotion in the serial's closing scenes, though he made sure to limit Davros's role in the story so he did not overshadow the Daleks.

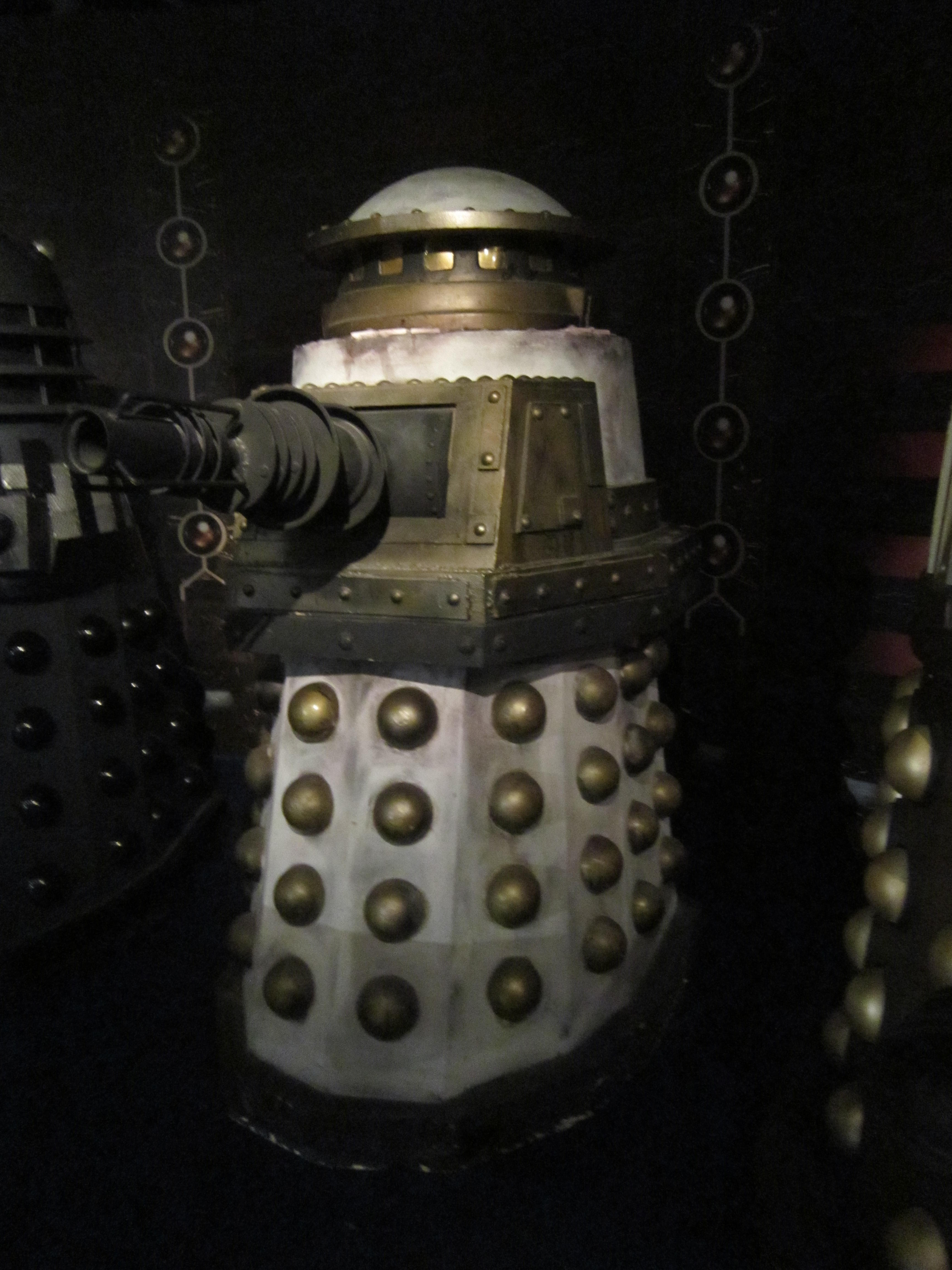
The Special Weapons Dalek's casing as it appears on display at the Doctor Who Experience

The grey Renegade Daleks had two of their props re-used from the prior serial, with two others being re-used from earlier in the show's run. A new prop was constructed for the serial, with part of it later being re-used for the serial's Emperor Dalek. Four white and gold Imperial Dalek props would be constructed for the serial. Various props and dummies were used for action scenes where Daleks were needed to be destroyed. The Emperor Dalek had a large, rounded head akin to Emperor Daleks portrayed in prior spin-off material. This head could open and contained inside Davros's head. An alternate design, dubbed the Special Weapons Dalek, is introduced in this serial. The Special Weapons Dalek is a bulkier design, depicting a flatter dome and a larger bazooka-like weapon. Originally designed as a floating weapons platform for the serial, it was redesigned in order to meet the serial's budget quota. The Special Weapons Dalek would later go on to make cameo appearances in future Dalek episodes, such as 2012's "Asylum of the Daleks" and 2015's "The Witch's Familiar".

Remembrance would be the last serial to feature the Daleks before the show's cancellation in 1989. The Daleks were originally planned to appear in the Doctor Who television movie released in 1996. Though they have an off-screen cameo in the final film, they originally had a significantly larger role, with the Daleks and Davros hoped to be able to act as the main antagonists of a potential new revival of the series following the film. Both would have undergone a drastic redesign, depicting their casings as a form of armour that was adaptable to different situations. Dubbed "Spider Daleks", they would have had six-legged casings, with the ability for a mutant controller to emerge from within and attack with claws, talons, or weapons. These designs were eventually scrapped due to a television series failing to emerge following the film's release.

=== 2005 revival ===
==== "Dalek" ====
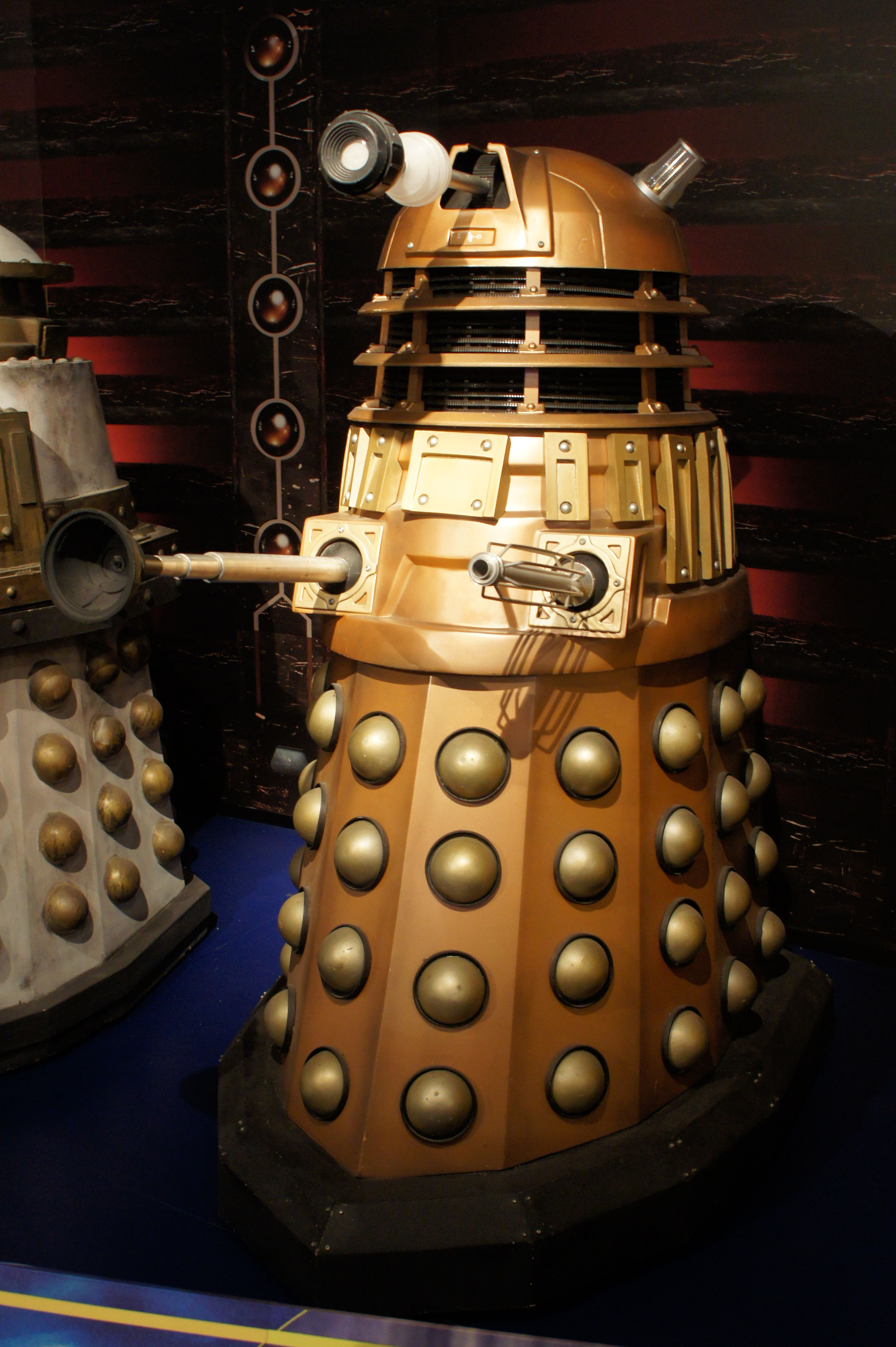
A Dalek casing as it appears in the show's 2005 revival

For the show's revival in 2005, showrunner Russell T Davies designed the sixth episode as a midway "jumping on point" for viewers, and aimed to incorporate the Daleks midway through. Davies was impressed by the 2003 audio drama story Jubilee, which depicted a lone surviving Dalek trapped and being tortured; Davies found the concept of the Doctor dealing with a sole Dalek intriguing. Davies sought to incorporate a lone Dalek into the narrative in a tight drama that would act as a prelude to the finale of the revival's first season, which would also feature the Daleks. Davies wished for the episode to reinvent the Daleks, bringing back menace to the species and dropping concepts that had "made them daft". This included addressing the public conception of Daleks being unable to traverse stairs by making them fly.

Davies wished for the episode, titled "Dalek", to be written by Jubilee's writer, Robert Shearman. Shearman sought to bring the Daleks back to a level of menace he felt hadn't been seen since prior to Davros's introduction, as he felt Davros turned the Daleks into his "lackeys" rather than letting the Daleks be an independent force of their own. Shearman sought to characterise the Daleks as emotional creatures, emphasising the fact there was a mutant creature inside the casing. Shearman gave the Daleks the ability to rotate segments of their body independently of each other, the ability to fly, and the ability to stop bullets using a forcefield surrounding their casing.

For the show's revival in 2005, the Daleks' casings were redesigned, sporting a bronze colour with an angular skirted design, an industrial look, and an "armored sturdiness". The redesign was headed by production designer Edward Thomas and the BBC Wales art department, with concept art made by artist Matt Savage. The team wished to preserve the Dalek's classic silhouette, but also wished to bulk up the design, referencing the Mini Cooper, which had been bulked up in a recent 2000 relaunch. Showrunner Russell T Davies requested the Daleks have a bronze colour scheme, with the lights on the Daleks' head being requested to resemble those used on the Daleks in the 1960s Dalek films. The new design utilised a mix of practical models and computer-generated graphics, with the physical models being primarily handled via a mix of remote control and physical actors. The design team wished to make the Daleks frightening for a new generation, with miniature effects supervisor Mike Tucker stating that "We have taken all the perceived weaknesses of the Dalek and made them deadly". Three props were constructed for the episode: one damaged prop for use in scenes featuring the damaged Dalek, a pristine prop for use in scenes featuring the repaired Dalek, and one open prop used for when the Dalek opens its casing to reveal the mutant inside.

==== Other mid-2000s appearances ====
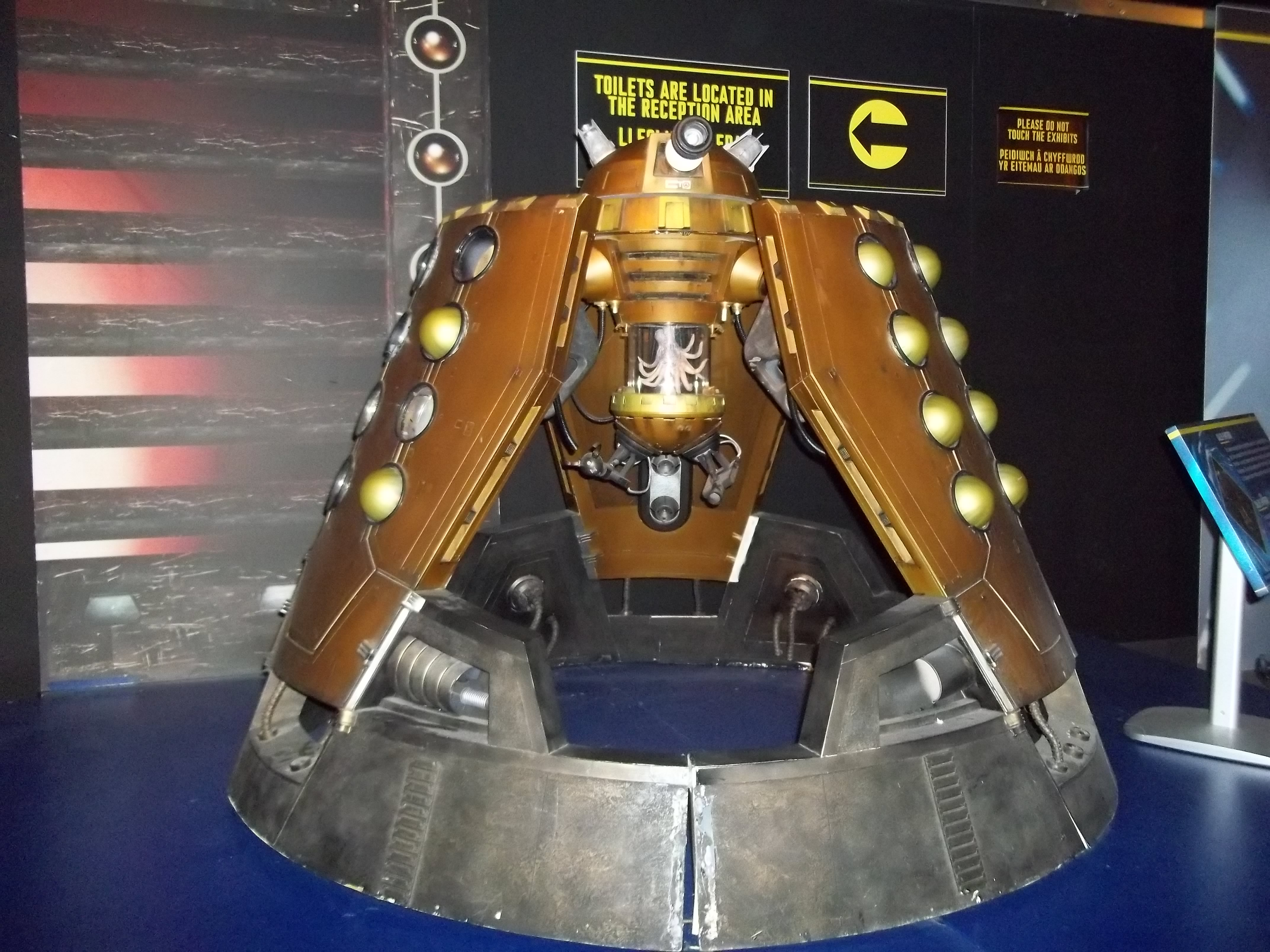
A model of the Dalek Emperor as it appears in the show's 2005 revival

The Daleks were intended to return for the finale, connecting back to the lone Dalek seen in "Dalek" and providing a twist for viewers who thought them destroyed. Though the Daleks here resembled their appearance in "Dalek", their plunger arm was substituted for a variety of other attachments on different Daleks, including a claw and a blowtorch. Their ships, additionally, were based off the "saucer" design seen in 1960s TV Comic strips. While pitching the 2005 revival to American investors, Davies used 2003 book Doctor Who: The Legend, which featured a large image of the 1967 Emperor Dalek. Liking the image, Davies elected to bring back the Emperor for the series. For the story, a significantly larger Emperor was introduced. This Emperor was unable to move like the 1967 Emperor, with a permanently open casing positioned into "three angled screens" which resembled "hexagonal shields". The Emperor was filmed using model work, with shots of the Emperor inserted on top of a green screen used during filming to make it appear significantly larger.

The Daleks' later return in 2006's "Army of Ghosts" and "Doomsday" was inspired by Davies wanting a series finale that would have stakes big enough to justify a separation of the series leads at the time, the Tenth Doctor and Rose Tyler. Davies envisioned a conflict between the Daleks and the Cybermen, which had yet to have been done in the series; Davies additionally believed this would be entertaining for younger viewers of the series. Davies enjoyed the idea of Daleks having a ranking system, and thus had one of the Daleks be painted black like the Black Daleks of the show's original run; this would become the character Dalek Sec. Sec, part of a group of four Daleks dubbed "The Cult of Skaro", would re-appear in 2007's "Daleks in Manhattan" and "Evolution of the Daleks", which would focus more on the elements of Daleks being born out of survival that were present in the show's original run. Sec would be mutated into a part-human hybrid, portrayed by Eric Loren. Loren wore a heavy prosthetic which had internal cooling fans, making hearing difficult during production. He studied the Daleks' vocal patterns, asking their voice actor, Nicholas Briggs, to speak their lines without the modulation usually used for the voice so he could replicate their delivery in his performance.

For the 2008 finale, "The Stolen Earth" and "Journey's End", Davies wanted a climactic finale that would raise the stakes higher than previous finales, featuring an antagonist that would threaten to destroy reality. The Daleks were brought back as antagonists, as was their creator Davros. Dalek Caan, one of the four Daleks of the Cult of Skaro, also returned, though he was now driven insane after saving Davros's life in-universe. Caan was portrayed with a destroyed casing, with the mutant inside visible. A new Dalek Supreme also served as a commander for the Daleks in the story.

=== 2010s and redesigns ===
==== Under Steven Moffat ====
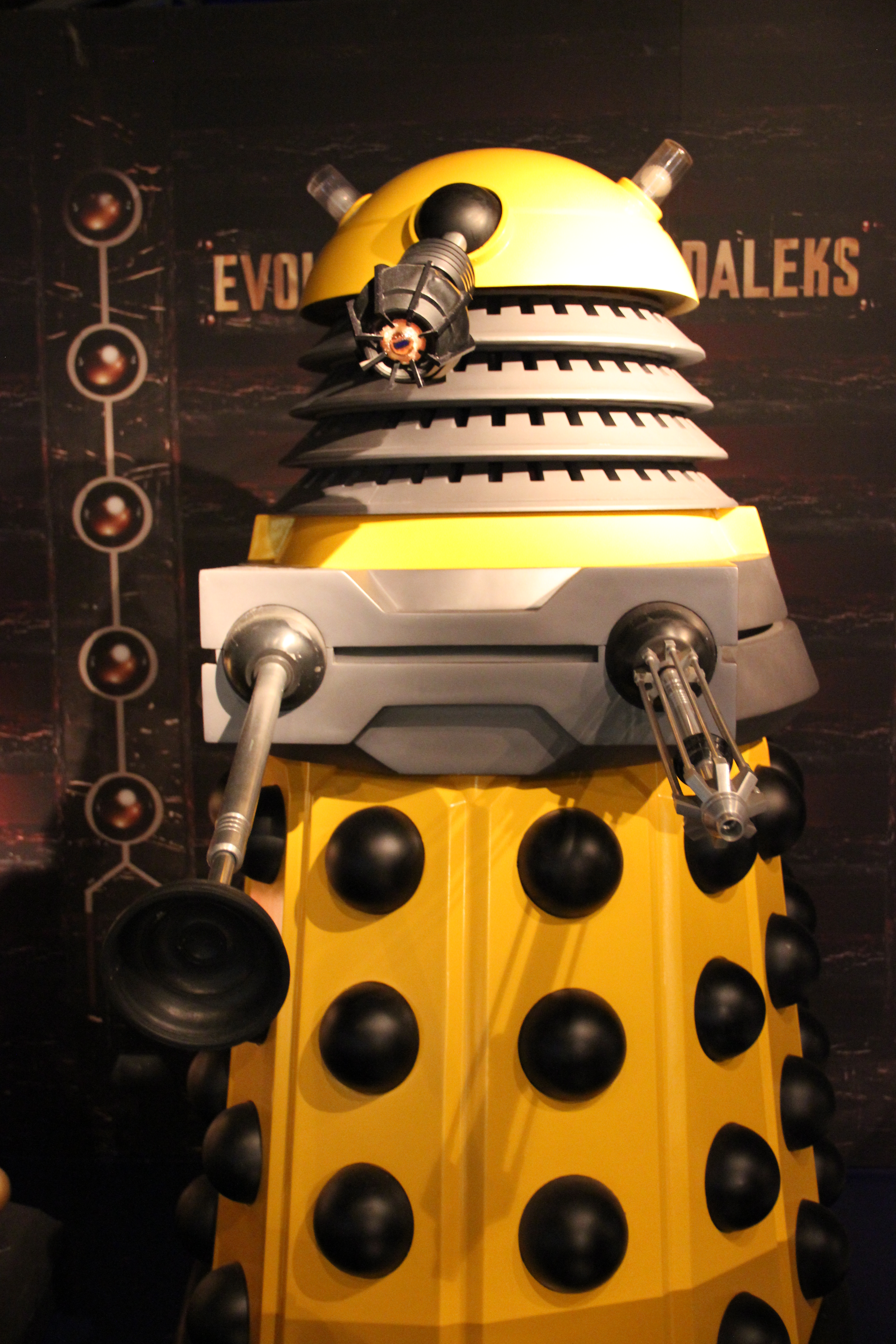
An Eternal New Paradigm Dalek casing, on display at the Doctor Who Experience

In 2010, showrunner Steven Moffat wished to bring back the Daleks, as they were popular among children and had become "one of the regulars". Moffat had writer Mark Gatiss write an episode about "Churchill versus the Daleks", which became "Victory of the Daleks". The Daleks would be redesigned again for the episode. This introduced the "New Dalek Paradigm", a brightly colored group of six Daleks with different roles: "Drone", "Strategist", "Scientist", "Supreme", and "Eternal". A green, sixth Dalek was planned, but scrapped. Steven Moffat wished for the Daleks to be redesigned, in accordance with the brand-wide revamp that would accompany his introduction as series showrunner. Taking into account criticism by Cusick about the 2005 design having visible screws, nuts, and bolts in the design, Moffat aimed for the new Dalek design to have smoother lines than the previous design.

These New Paradigm Daleks were intended to call back to the Daleks from the 1960s films, primarily in their colors, which Moffat requested have a candy-like colour palette, in contrast to concept artist Peter McKinstry's desire for a more metallic appearance. The New Paradigm Daleks were significantly larger, with different proportions and silhouette, an organic eyeball on their eyestalk and an increased bulk at the shoulder section creating a "hump" in the Daleks' back; this hump was where a hatch on their back was placed, which would be used to store weapons. Episode writer Mark Gatiss wanted them to be larger in order to make the designs more intimidating. Though the designs were intended to replace the previous Dalek design, showrunner Steven Moffat stated that the old design would co-exist with the New Paradigm. Due to the unpopularity of the New Paradigm designs among fans, the Paradigm were slowly phased out of the series, only being used for exhibitions and live events. Moffat later admitted the designs were a mistake.

In 2011, Moffat announced that the Daleks were being put on hiatus for a period, believing that the Daleks' frequent appearances made them the "most reliably defeatable enemies in the universe" and that their legacy as British icons had made them "cuddly" over the years. 2012's "Asylum of the Daleks" was intended to bring a level of malice back into the Daleks. The production team elected to include a variety of Dalek designs into the episode's narrative, with designs from 1963 to 2010 featuring throughout the story. The story also gave the Daleks the ability to use small robotic creatures to convert other lifeforms into "Dalek Puppets", which act as servants to the Daleks. They are used for subterfuge, disguising their identity by maintaining their original outward appearance.

2014's "Into the Dalek" was inspired by a discussion in early 2009 regarding Doctor Who: The Adventure Games. Moffat had pitched the idea of shrinking down into a Dalek, inspired by the 1966 film Fantastic Voyage, and decided to instead adapt that concept into an episode. Episode writer Phil Ford centred the themes of the story around the Twelfth Doctor's moral conflict of good and evil, having the Doctor want to go inside a Dalek to see if he could make it "good" to deal with the darkness within himself. This Dalek, nicknamed Rusty in the episode, would later be brought back for the 2017 Christmas special "Twice Upon a Time", with Moffat and Briggs citing a fondness for the character that led to his return.

==== Under Chris Chibnall and beyond ====
When Chris Chibnall took over as Doctor Who's showrunner in 2017, he announced that Doctor Who series 11 would not feature any returning alien species, including the Daleks. The Daleks would later return in the 2019 New Year's Day special episode "Resolution". Chibnall stated he wanted the Daleks to return so lead actress Jodie Whittaker could encounter them, and also so the Daleks would act as the bookend to series 11. For "Resolution", the Daleks' casings received a redesign, though it was specified that the design would not be species-wide and only apply to the Dalek in the episode. The design has a more industrial and rusty look from prior designs, done to emphasize that the casing was rebuilt from scratch out of scrap parts by the episode's Recon Dalek. The design uses red light in its dome, and replaces the plunger-like appendage for a claw-like one. The Dalek introduced in the serial was not portrayed by any actor, with the prop instead being entirely remote-controlled. To avoid the Daleks' return being leaked prior to its official reveal, the Dalek was given the codename "Kevin" to refer to it in behind the scenes documentation.

A similar design was later introduced in 2021 episode "Revolution of the Daleks", which is heavily based on the design featured in "Resolution." Chibnall and executive producer Mark Strevens wished to "contemporize" the Daleks, and make a different and sleeker Dalek design. The new models have slightly altered proportions, emanate a substantial amount of blue light from their domes, and have had their sink plunger-like appendage replaced with a spiky, all-purpose tool. The Daleks were "bulked up" in response to criticism that the "Resolution" design was too thin. The skirt of the Dalek was also redesigned. The new Dalek models for the episode, unlike prior ones, are entirely remote controlled. In subsequent special "Eve of the Daleks", the Daleks returned to their bronze 2005 design, though used different appendages for the episode, with their usual gun being replaced by a gatling gun-styled weapon.

Following Russell T Davies's return as showrunner in 2023, he stated that the Daleks would be put on "pause", believing that their frequent appearances during Chibnall's tenure as showrunner resulted in them being on the cusp of being overused in the series.

A new design based on the 2005 version will appear in the upcoming animated pre-school series Doctor Who: TARDIS Crew.

=== Other subjects ===
==== Voice ====
An example of the Daleks' voice.

The Daleks' voice originated with sound designer Brian Hodgson at the BBC Radiophonic Workshop. Hodgson had previously helped with making a robot voice for the radio show Sword From The Stars. Due to little discussion on how the Daleks' voice would sound, Hodgson re-used the technique from the radio show for the Daleks, with Hodgson experimenting with a ring modulator device, which distorted the voices of actors speaking into it. Actor Peter Hawkins was brought on board to voice the Daleks. The Daleks' signature staccato voice was made by Hawkins as a result of technical issues with the modulator; the modulator would only affect vowels, and Hawkins would elongate the vowels at Hodgson's request in order to ensure the voice's audibility. According to crew member Sue Webb, she also aided with further research for how the voice should sound, going to the Post Office to get their advice on distorting the audio. The 1985 episode Revelation of the Daleks, at the request of director Graeme Harper, would remove more modulation from the Daleks' voice.

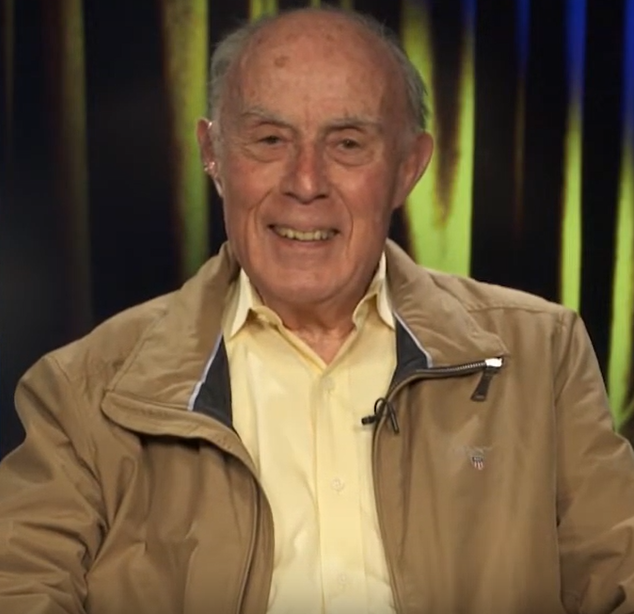
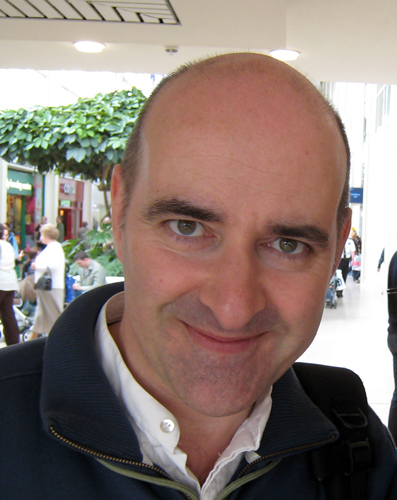
David Graham (left) and Nicholas Briggs (right) are two of the actors who have voiced the Daleks

Early Dalek actors would speak their lines in a booth off-screen, with Dalek actors having to make sure they moved in sync with the dialogue. Other actors would portray the Daleks throughout the classic series alongside Hawkins, including David Graham, who portrayed the role from 1963 onwards, Royce Mills, who portrayed the Daleks between 1984 and 1988, and Roy Skelton, who portrayed the Daleks from 1967 until 1988, with a later reprisal in Comic Relief special The Curse of Fatal Death.

Actor Nicholas Briggs voiced the Daleks in Big Finish Productions' licensed audio dramas following the series' cancellation in 1988. Briggs adopted the same usage of the ring modulator, but added a more hateful staccato inspired by the Nazis to make the Daleks sound more intimidating. When Doctor Who was revived in 2005, showrunner Russell T Davies asked for Briggs to come back to voice the Daleks, being impressed with Briggs's performance, as well as his technical expertise with the equipment needed to voice the Daleks. Briggs attempts to give each Dalek he voices a unique personality, adding small details to differentiate each performance. Briggs attends script read-throughs with his voice modulator, and also attends filming. At filming, Briggs rehearses alongside Dalek prop actors Barnaby Edwards and Nicholas Pegg. Briggs's Dalek voice is transmitted to the Dalek's headlights, allowing cast to see which Dalek is speaking at a given moment, while Briggs's voice is transmitted through a speaker on set.

For the Emperor Dalek in "Bad Wolf" and "The Parting of the Ways", Briggs portrayed the Emperor with a much deeper, booming voice. The Cult of Skaro would also have different, unique voices for the four individual Daleks, with Caan in particular having a unique voice for his subsequent appearance in "The Stolen Earth" and "Journey's End", which featured a large amount of insane giggling. For the episode "Resolution", Briggs used a different performance in order to hide the fact that the episode's monster was a Dalek from the audience. As the episode progressed, his voice slowly reverted to his standard Dalek voice. Briggs made the episode's Recon Dalek sound more arrogant and hateful than the standard Dalek, wanting to reflect the Recon Dalek's hatred for its many years in isolation.

==== Copyright status ====
Reforms caused by Sydney Newman in the script-writing department led to scripts being held on a contracted, self-employed basis. Doctor Who's scripts were the first held under this system, and due to uncertainties resulting from this system, the Daleks' copyright status was left unclear. Though this was initially without issue, the Daleks' immense popularity meant a solution had to be ironed out. This was eventually resolved as the BBC and the Nation estate having joint ownership over the Daleks, though it has also been stated by the book The American Villain: Encyclopedia of Bad Guys in Comics, Film, and Television that Nation instead had the forethought to copyright the Daleks separately. While Raymond Cusick's original Dalek design is owned by the BBC, the concept of the Daleks is owned separately by Terry Nation's estate.

Prior to the show's revival in 2005, the BBC and Nation's estate came into disagreement over the BBC's usage of the Daleks. The BBC stated that the Nation estate demanded "unacceptable levels of editorial control" over the Daleks' appearances, while the Nation estate accused the BBC of trying to ruin the Daleks' public image, such as via allegedly trying to produce a television series starring "gay Daleks" as well as due to letting Warner Bros. use the Daleks in Looney Tunes: Back in Action without the Nation estate's permission. Though it initially seemed as though the Daleks would not be appearing in the first series of the revival, with the BBC reporting that a deal had failed to come through, the BBC and Nation estate were able to come to an agreement in August 2004. If the deal had fallen through, showrunner Russell T Davies planned to have a race of humans from the future, locked in metallic casings, fill the Daleks' eventual role in the series. These humans would later serve as the basis for the Toclafane, who would appear as separate antagonists later in the series.

An urban legend surrounding the series, regarding the Daleks' frequent appearances, opined that the show was contractually obligated to bring the Daleks back every year, or the show would risk losing the rights to use the Daleks. Showrunner Steven Moffat debunked this theory.

== Reception and analysis ==
=== Dalekmania ===
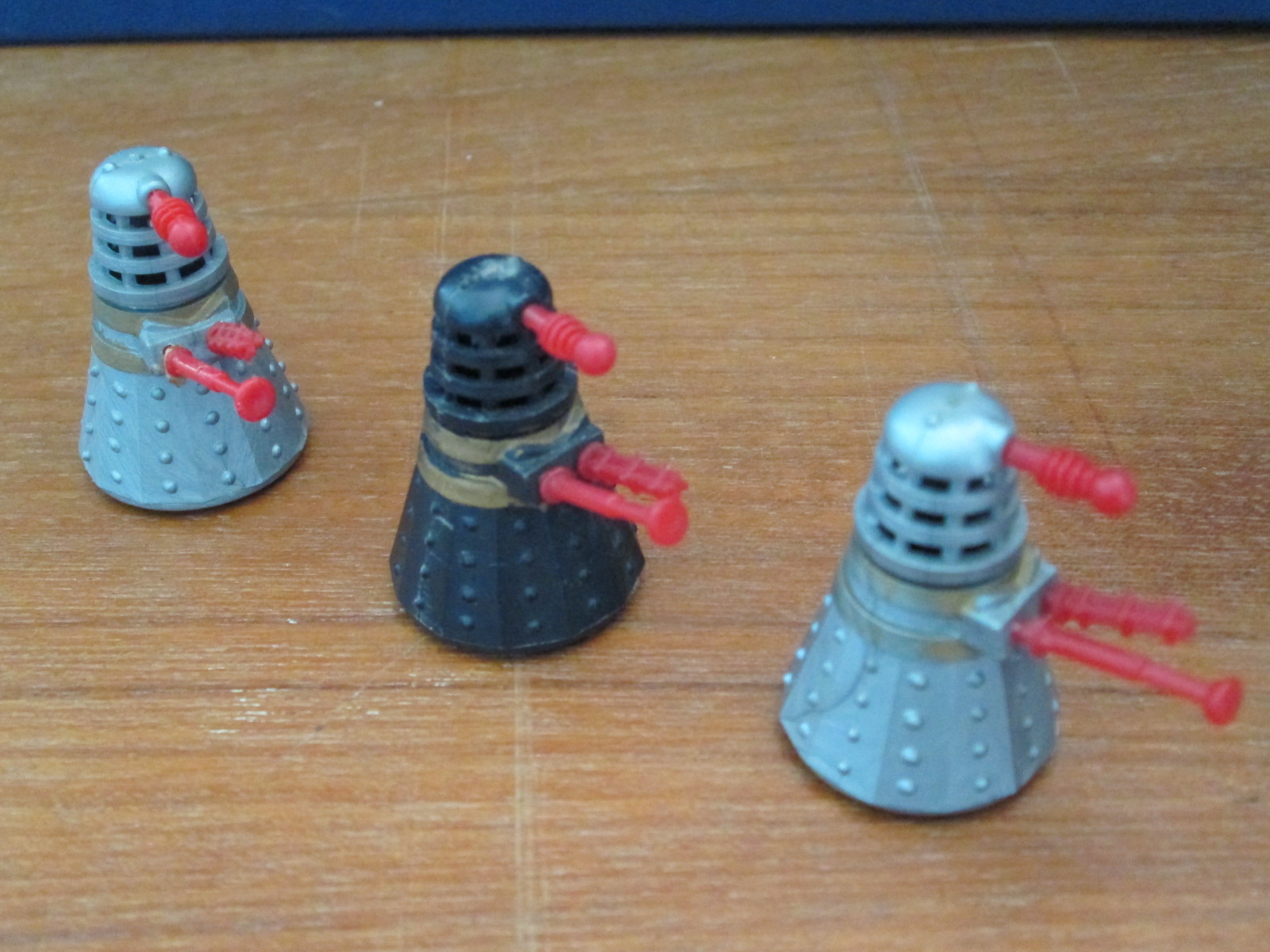
Toy Daleks from the 1960s

Doctor Who was initially under threat of being axed. The first serial of the programme underperformed, and many believed it would not survive its allotted 52-week run. The Daleks was incredibly successful, and large rushes of fan mail arrived at the BBC asking about the Daleks and their return. The Daleks were especially popular with children, who frequently imitated the Daleks. The popularity resulted in the Daleks having a sequel episode commissioned almost as soon as their debut finished airing, with the BBC strongly interested in seeing how to further utilize the Daleks' popularity. The success of the Daleks changed the trajectory of Doctor Who's focus, shifting it away from educational adventures in the past to space-based alien adventures in the future, guaranteeing the success of the show and allowing it to avoid cancellation. Merchandise followed, such as The Dalek Book. The book was the first attempt to create a dedicated mythology for the creatures beyond the programme, and was incredibly successful, with high predicted sales.

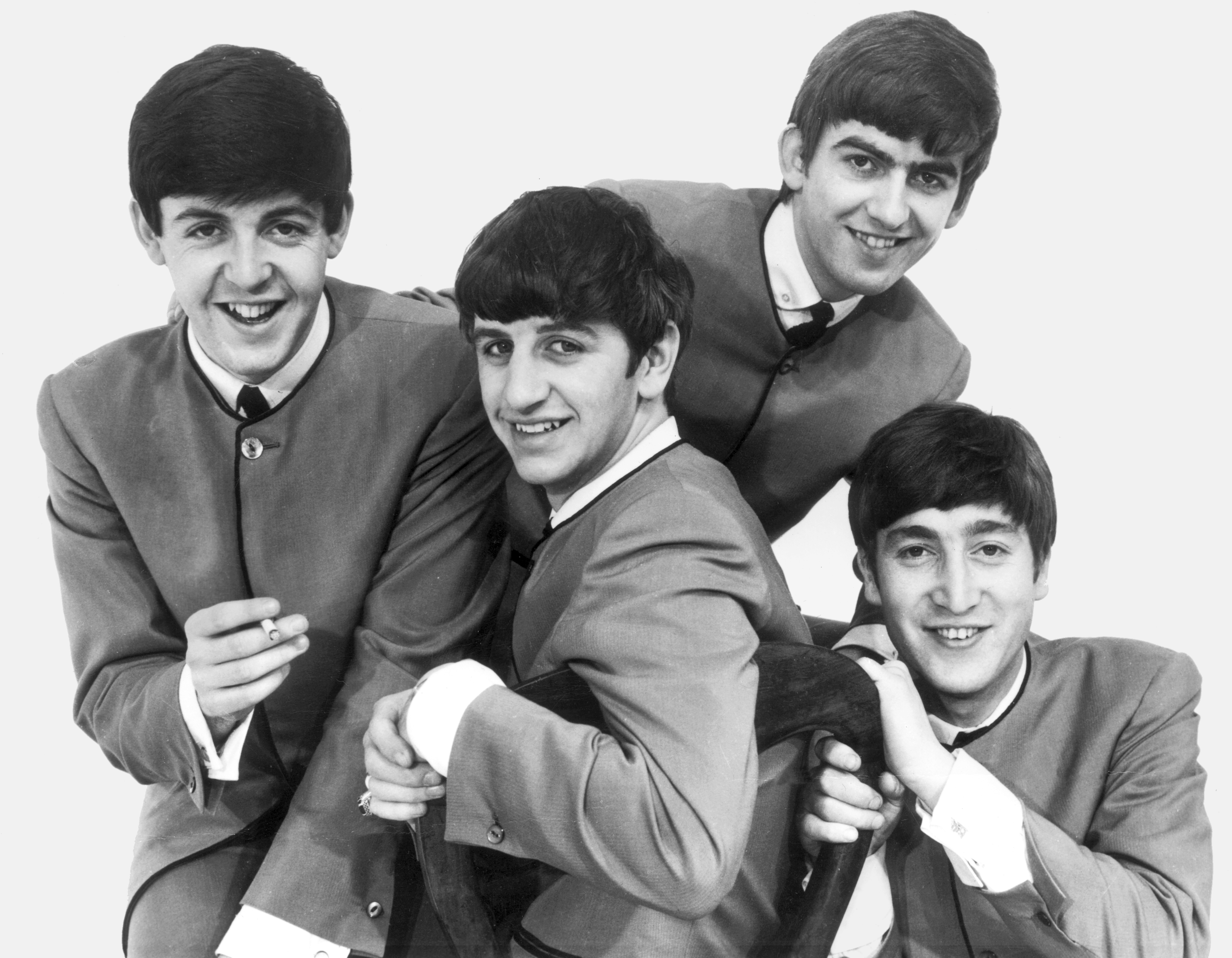
The wave of the Daleks' popularity was compared to and briefly surpassed that of popular band the Beatles (pictured), leading to the name "Dalekmania"

The airing of the second Dalek story led to the official outbreak of what was dubbed "Dalekmania". The Daleks were used in promotion across the country throughout the year of 1964. Competitor channel ITV put highly popular band The Beatles on at the same time as Dalek episodes were airing, but the Daleks were still earning a higher viewing share. The BBC were not prepared for this level of success, as no other programme before had yielded such a popular response. This resulted in no merchandise being prepared, though the BBC quickly expanded. The following year saw an expansion of Dalek merchandise, including toys, clothes, wallpaper, and sweets. A "Dalek playsuit" product was so successful that the manufacturer sold out, though the playsuits were later redesigned for safety concerns, such as a lack of visibility from inside and fears children could get stuck in the suit. Other products released around the time included the novelty record "I'm Gonna Spend My Christmas with a Dalek" by The Go-Go's and a stage play created by Nation titled The Curse of the Daleks. The subsequent Dalek serial, The Dalek Invasion of Earth, proved to be even more popular, breaking into the weekly top ten in viewing figures. Film adaptations of two of the Dalek serials were produced by Amicus Productions, though these received mixed responses.

Dalekmania came to a close by 1966, following the release of the second Dalek film. The success of Dalekmania made Nation extremely rich. Cusick, despite his hand in the Daleks' design, did not receive anything from the success, causing him to quit the show in 1966. Due to the Daleks' success, several attempts at recreating this popularity were attempted with subsequent monsters, such as the Voord and Mechonoids, though they were largely less successful than the Daleks.

=== Reception ===
The Daleks have been consistently identified as one of the most well-known, popular, and iconic monsters to hail from the series. They have been stated by BBC News to have become a part of British heritage. They also attributed the Daleks to the success of the series, citing their contrast with the Doctor as antagonists as being a large part of the series' longevity. Their usage of the phrase "Exterminate!" has become known even to those who have never seen the series. A 2008 survey by National Trust found that nine in ten children could identify a Dalek, while readers of the magazine SFX identified the Daleks as the most terrifying monster in all of fiction, beating out other iconic characters like Gollum and Godzilla. The word Dalek was also added as a word to the Oxford English Dictionary.

A 1966 piece by The Guardian identified the Daleks as being popular due to the simplicity of their character, with audiences knowing exactly what to expect of how they would act. The Daleks were also easy to replicate, with children being able to mimic their mannerisms easily. The book Doctor Who: A History stated that the Daleks were popular with adults due to the science fiction take on the Nazis, while children enjoyed them due to their inhuman nature. Children were also fascinated by the Daleks due to seeing themselves in the Daleks, relating to the Daleks frequent "temper tantrums" on screen. The book The American Villain: Encyclopedia of Bad Guys in Comics, Film, and Television stated that the Daleks are defined by their hatred of other life forms, being an unstoppable force that opposes the strength of the individual. The US Catholic stated that the Daleks were a representation of racial hatred within the show, and their frequent returns symbolised how there must always be a good force like the Doctor willing to oppose them. Andrew Blair, writing for Den of Geek, stated that the Daleks' ruthlessness and tendency to cause heavy amounts of destruction allows for them to become stronger and more effective antagonists, with episodes lacking in those qualities resulting in the Daleks being less well-received as antagonists.

The Daleks' frequent re-appearances, and whether they should have "breaks" from the program, have been the subject of commentary. J.R Southall, writing for Starburst, stated that the Daleks were an antagonist that set the stage for all future antagonists to come in the series, and that their appearances heightened the episodes they were in. He believed it was an incredibly exciting moment for children to see them, and that the Daleks being put on a pause would hinder the show's overall success. Blair, in another article for Den of Geek, stated that the Daleks, despite objections of their over-familiarity, had a large number of potential concepts for stories, with past concepts that were considered "hypocritical" to the Daleks' lore being emphasised as only expanding on the Daleks' own in-universe character. Blair felt the Daleks should be re-invented without needing to feel bound to the constraints of their lore, which he considered a better alternative than shelving the Daleks. Radio Times, in their podcast, cited similar sentiments, believing that the Daleks had a large amount of potential for future stories despite their frequent appearances.

The popularity of the Daleks during Dalekmania led to the Daleks becoming too familiar, rendering their further appearances lacking in impact and leading to the Daleks being made fun of as "plunger-wielding pepperpots who could be defeated by climbing the stairs". Davros's subsequent appearances in Classic series episodes featuring the Daleks was also stated to have weakened the Daleks' threat in the minds of the audience. The episode "Dalek" has been credited with helping revive the Daleks' state as terrifying antagonists in the minds of audiences. The design introduced in that episode noticeably was constructed to emphasise the threat of the Daleks, with the use of a bronze colour and uneven rivets and architecture in the casing design being used to make the Daleks striking and imposing even in a still photograph. The Guardian considered the Daleks an example of the "pop art" movement due to the mix of the "absurd and marvellous" present in their design.

In 2023, fourteen newly discovered wasp species were named with the genus name of "Dalek", with one being named "Dalek nationi" after the Daleks' creator Terry Nation. Dr. John Noyes named them after the Daleks due to being a fan of the series and finding the name to be a good fit for a genus.

=== Analysis ===
Charlie Jane Anders, writing for Gizmodo, analysed the Doctor's dynamic with the Daleks, stating that the Doctor's hatred for them leads to him being defined as a character in opposition to the Daleks, and highlighted how "Into the Dalek" emphasised and expanded on the dynamic between the Doctor and the Daleks. Marc DiPaolo, in the book Fire and Snow: Climate Fiction from the Inklings to Game of Thrones, contrasted the Daleks' fascist tendencies with the ideology of the Doctor, stating that the Daleks' pure evil and opposition to the Doctor posed questions of the Doctor's morality and pacifism, and whether or not the Doctor had a right to adopt similarly evil and cruel tactics, such as committing genocide against the Daleks, in order to stop them. It stated that this contrast posed the question of how much opposition could be given to fascism before the opposition would become fascist themselves. Bronwen Calvert, in the book Being Bionic: The World of TV Cyborgs, analysed this dynamic present in the episode "Dalek", pointing out the episode's emphasis on the similarities between the Doctor and the Dalek, which showed how the Doctor was becoming more Dalek-like in his actions while the Dalek became better able to showcase its individuality and suffering. The dichotomy between the Doctor and the Daleks is stated to be further emphasised in subsequent episodes in the series, which are stated to redefine the Doctor's beliefs of "good" and "bad" by portraying neither the Doctor nor the Daleks as explicitly either.

Kristine Larsen, in the book Doctor Who in Time and Space: Essays on Themes, Characters, History and Fandom, 1963-2012 analysed the recurring theme of what makes a "pure" Dalek within their appearances in the show's revival. It stated that the Daleks' belief in their own superiority caused them to warp their own agendas and ideals in order to survive and maintain it, which eventually led to not only innumerable atrocities, but also their own self-destruction. Richard A. Hall, writing in The American Villain: Encyclopedia of Bad Guys in Comics, Film, and Television, questioned the Daleks' nature in the series, stating that since the Daleks are defined by how a non-Dalek society is perceived as evil, it is unclear whether the Daleks are themselves evil or if they would be able to change without turning them into something they are not. It cited how this reflected how the series reflected the interpretation of the individual versus the interpretation of a collective.

Hall later states that the Daleks reflected a fear of a weapon created by humans growing out of humanity's control. Patrick Stokes, writing in Doctor Who and Philosophy: Bigger on the Inside, analysed the usage of Nazi allegories in the Daleks' design. It stated that despite the inhumanity and cruelty of the Daleks, they served as an example of what humanity could become. It stated that the Daleks' reflection of humanity symbolised what humans could become: creatures that lack individuality and cause destruction and cruelty for survival, or creatures that could resist and fight against that threat. Kevin S. Decker, writing in Who is Who?: The Philosophy of Doctor Who, identified the Daleks as being characterised as an "Other" psychologically, and that the fear that came with that feeling dwindled as more about the Daleks became known. It stated that the show's revival and the upgrades that came with the Daleks helped reinvent the species for a modern audience, allowing the threat that came with them to be credibly shown on screen, while also providing further depth to the character of the species. Danny Nicol, in the book Doctor Who: A British Alien?, similarly characterised the Daleks' first appearance in The Daleks as relying on viewers to see them as an "Other", and that, as a result, and that it characterises the Doctor comparatively as someone unwilling to compromise with someone unfamiliar to them.
