= Jubilee (audio drama) =

2003 Doctor Who audio drama

Big Finish Productions audio drama
- Series: Doctor Who
- Release no.: 40
- Featuring: Sixth Doctor; Evelyn Smythe
- Written by: Robert Shearman
- Directed by: Nicholas Briggs
- Produced by: Gary Russell; Jason Haigh-Ellery
- Executive producer: Jacqueline Rayner
- Production code: 7CG
- Length: 2 hr 20 mins
- Release date: January 2003
- Preceded by: "Bang-Bang-a-Boom!"
- Followed by: "Nekromanteia"

Jubilee is a Big Finish Productions audio drama based on the long-running British science fiction television series Doctor Who. It was written by Robert Shearman Jubilee was released to celebrate Doctor Who's fortieth anniversary. Elements of the story were reworked by Shearman to create the episode "Dalek" for the 2005 series.

== Plot ==
The Sixth Doctor and Evelyn, having followed a weird transmission, arrives in London in 2003, but they quickly notice that the city appears strange and looks unusually dirty and dusty. Before they can properly investigate, the TARDIS suddenly flees in terror and leaves them behind. The Doctor is then suddenly stricken by a weird sense of deja vu, and realizes that he and Evelyn have landed in an alternate timeline. England, now known as the "English Empire", has become the central political power of the world, following the events "The Great Dalek War of 1903", and is ruled by the despotic President Rochester, who holds the sole surviving Dalek in the universe as a captive, and uses it as a part of his propaganda campaign of death.

As the Doctor and Evelyn try to restore the original timeline, they discover that they are being worshipped as heroes of the Dalek war, a fact which worries the Doctor, as he suddenly has faint and rather out-of-place memories of having fought in that war, and perhaps even more disturbingly, he can't recall if he ever managed to escape from it.

== Cast ==
- Sixth Doctor — Colin Baker
- Evelyn Smythe — Maggie Stables
- Miriam Rochester — Rosalind Ayres
- Dalek Voices — Nicholas Briggs
- Female Movie Star — Georgina Carter
- Farrow — Steven Elder
- Male Movie Star — Jack Galagher
- Nigel Rochester — Martin Jarvis
- Lamb — Kai Simmons

== Conception ==
In a retrospective 2025 interview, Rob Shearman credited the creation of Jubilee to his alarm at "the growing acceptance of far-right politics" at the time of its writing in 2002, although has since reflected it "seems like such an innocent time" compared to the year of the interview. The use of jubilee in the title is a direct reference to the 40th anniversary of Doctor Who, the year the story released, which Shearman meant as a form of satire when considering the at-the-time view of Daleks in popular culture: "Daleks were being treated in popular media at the time...as funny jokes with sink plungers, spoofed on comedy shows like Victor Lewis-Smith and used to advertise Kit-Kats. It was so easy to forget that these cute little pepperpots had in the 1960s been used to represent Nazis. I wanted to examine that way we take all that we’ve fought against and make it silly and safe – and what the dangers of that might be."

== Release ==
Jubilee received positive reviews from critics. Den of Geek's Andrew Blair called the episode "ambitious."

=== Adaptation ===
The story was adapted for television, in the revived series episode, "Dalek," starring Christopher Eccleston as the Ninth Doctor.

=== In print ===
A novelisation written by Shearman will be published 9 October 2025 in Hardcover and ebook formats.
