= The Chain Gang (radio series) =

The Chain Gang is a British radio series broadcast on the digital radio station BBC 7. There have so far been two series, the first in 2004 and the second in 2007. The format of the series is that the first episode is scripted by the production team and ends with a cliffhanger. Listeners are then invited to write further episodes. The best submission is then recorded and transmitted and again ends with cliffhanger, after which listeners can submit further suggestions.

The first series was entitled Amnesia and had six episodes. The second was entitled Picture This, with the initial and final script supplied by Rob Shearman better known as a script writer for the television series Doctor Who. The second series consisted of thirteen episodes and three alternate endings.

== BBC7 Chain Gang Series 2 Picture This. April 2007 to June 2007. ==
Episode 1, by Robert Shearman

Episode 2, by Ian MacKenzie

Episode 3, by Ric Treval

Episode 4, by Tom Johnstone

Episode 5, by Dave Wilner

Episode 6, by Christopher Stanners

Episode 7, by Phil Girdlestone

Episode 8, by Jennifer Moore

Episode 9, by David Hutchison

Episode 10, by Jayne Clements

Episode 11, by Jon Radlett

Episode 12, by Phil Kurthausen

Episode 13, by Robert Shearman

Alternate Ending 1, by Jacqueline Saville

Alternate Ending 2, by Steph May

Alternate Ending 3, by Jon Radlett

The episodes were available on the BBC7 Chaingang webpage in audio and written formats until the website was restructured.

The series was awarded a Bronze in the Sony Radio Academy Awards' The Competition Award category.
