= Robert Shearman =

English writer

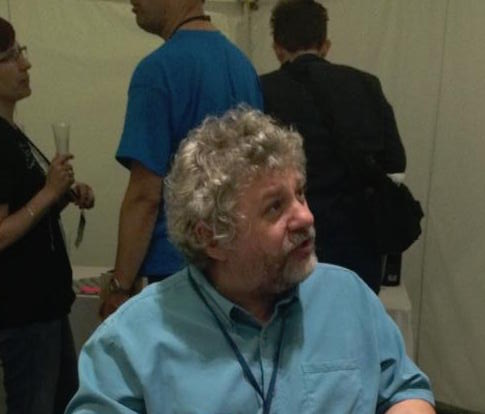
- Robert Shearman, August 2014
- Born: Robert Charles Shearman; 10 February 1970 (age 56); Horsham, Sussex, England
- Occupations: Author, playwright, screenwriter
- Writing career
- Genres: Fantasy, horror, science fiction, dark fantasy, absurdism, magical realism, Black comedy

Robert Charles Shearman, sometimes credited as Rob Shearman, is an English television, radio, stage play and short story writer. He is known for his World Fantasy Award-winning short stories, as well as his work for Doctor Who, and his association with Jarvis & Ayres Productions (Martin Jarvis and Rosalind Ayres) which has resulted in six plays for BBC Radio 4, broadcast in the station's regular weekday Afternoon Play slot, and one classic serial.

== Education ==
Shearman was educated at Reigate Grammar School (where he was a contemporary of David Walliams) and the University of Exeter. During this time, he was regularly seen on stage at the university in various productions.

== Career ==
An established theatrical playwright, Shearman has worked with Alan Ayckbourn, had a play produced by Francis Ford Coppola, and has received several international awards for his work in theatre. Award-winning plays include Fool to Yourself, which premiered at the Stephen Joseph Theatre in 1997, and which won the inaugural Sophie Winter Memorial Trust Award, Easy Laughter, (Sunday Times Playwriting Award), Coupling, (World Drama Trust Award), Binary Dreamers, (Guinness Award for Theatre Ingenuity, in association with the Royal National Theatre). In 1993 he was made resident dramatist at the Northcott Theatre in Exeter, the youngest playwright to be honoured by the Arts Council in this way, and for them he wrote a series of plays, including his controversial comic fable about God living in suburbia, Breaking Bread Together, which later was revived in London. His association with his mentor, Alan Ayckbourn, has been particularly fruitful, with White Lies, About Colin, and Knights in Plastic Armour proving especially popular.

At this time Shearman was also encouraged to become a director for the theatre, largely reviving productions of his work abroad; in the 1990s he had a recurring engagement with the Teatro Agora in Rome, and, in 2007, the revival he directed of his comedy Shaw Cornered, was the stand-out hit as international guest at the Old World Theatre Festival in Delhi, India. In 2010, Big Finish published seven of his better known stage plays as Caustic Comedies.

His first television work was episodes of the 1950s-set rural drama Born and Bred, broadcast on BBC One.

Shearman also provided the initial script for the second series of the BBC 7 programme The Chain Gang: Picture This. The series was awarded a Bronze in the Sony Radio Academy Awards' "The Competition Award" category. A further series of The Chain Gang, this time called Paper, Scissors, Stone, was a thirteen-part drama series, in which Shearman worked weekly from listeners' suggestions in shaping the story; this won a Silver at the Sony Radio Awards.

He worked as a story consultant on the 2024 Apple TV+ series Constellation created by Peter Harness.

=== Doctor Who ===
His association with Doctor Who began with a play written for BBV Audios, Punchline, in which Sylvester McCoy played the Dominie, a disguised version of the Seventh Doctor. This was penned under the pseudonym "Jeremy Leadbetter" (the name of a character from the popular BBC sitcom The Good Life). Several audio plays for Big Finish followed, The Holy Terror, The Chimes of Midnight and Jubilee all winning best audio drama in the Doctor Who Magazine polls of their respective years. He has also had Doctor Who short stories published - his most recent being a chapter in the BBC Books novel The Story of Martha, which was released in December 2008.

Shearman wrote the television episode "Dalek" for the 2005 series of Doctor Who produced by Russell T Davies for the BBC. This was, at Davies' request, a re-working of the themes introduced in Shearman's earlier Big Finish audio play Jubilee. "Dalek" was nominated for the Hugo Award for Best Dramatic Presentation, Short Form in 2006, and came in second in terms of votes for its category. Shearman provided an audio commentary for the episode on the Doctor Who – Complete First Series DVD box set.

In a 2021 interview, Shearman revealed he had been involved in development for Series 5, but later departed. Head writer Steven Moffat kept up an open invitation to return, but Shearman declined, citing changes in his career and the higher profile of writers on the series.

=== Prose writing ===
His first book, a collection of short stories called Tiny Deaths, was published by Comma Press in November 2007. It was shortlisted for the Edge Hill Short Story Prize and made the longlist for the Frank O'Connor International Short Story Award. In November 2008, it was named Best Collection at the annual World Fantasy Awards. In 2009, one of the stories from the book, "No Looking Back", was selected by the National Library of Singapore for the Read! Singapore campaign, ensuring the story was published separately as a mini-book and distributed all over the country in English, Chinese, Malay and Tamil; the author was flown over to Singapore to give talks and interviews.

His second collection, Love Songs for the Shy and Cynical, was published in late 2009. An odder, darker book than the first, it won the British Fantasy Award, the Edge Hill Short Story Reader's Prize - making Shearman the first writer ever to be nominated twice for this award - and the Shirley Jackson Award. A special collector's edition contained "The Hidden Story"; a tale about letters found within books, each copy was handwritten by the author, and contained in envelopes within envelopes in a Russian doll effect.

In the same year, Mad Norwegian Press published Wanting to Believe, a book by Shearman that examines The X-Files and its spin-off series (Millennium and The Lone Gunmen) in a critical fashion. Also in 2009, Shearman collaborated with comedian Toby Hadoke to watch and comment on every episode of Doctor Who from the programme's debut in 1963 to David Tennant's final story. The resulting discussions are being published by Mad Norwegian Press in three volumes as Running Through Corridors: Rob and Toby's Marathon Watch of Doctor Who. The first volume, covering the 1960s, was published in 2010; the second volume, covering the 1970s, was published in 2016.

His third collection, "half short stories, half novel", was published in June 2011, called Everyone's Just So So Special.

== Selected works ==
=== Theatre works ===
- Dented Crowns (1991)
- Couplings (1991)
- Easy Laughter (1992)*
- Breaking Bread Together (1993)
- The Mayor of Casterbridge (adapted from Hardy) (1993)
- The Magical Tales of the Brothers Grimm (1993)
- White Lies (1994)*
- Great Expectations (adapted from Dickens) (1994)
- Fool to Yourself (1995)*
- Binary Dreamers (1996)*
- Mercy Killings (1997)
- About Colin (1998)
- Desperate Remedies (adapted from Hardy) (1998)
- Jekyll and Hyde (adapted from Stevenson) (1998)
- Knights in Plastic Armour (1999)*
- Inappropriate Behaviour (2000)*
- Pride and Prejudice (adapted from Austen) (2000)
- Shaw Cornered (2001)*

* Collected in Caustic Comedies.

=== Fiction books ===
- Tiny Deaths (Comma Press, 2007)
- Love Songs for the Shy and Cynical (Big Finish, 2009)
- Everyone's Just So So Special (Big Finish, 2011)
- Remember Why You Fear Me (ChiZine Publications, 2012)
- They Do the Same Things Different There (ChiZine Publications, 2014)
- We All Hear Stories in the Dark (PS Publishing UK, 2020)
- Doctor Who: Dalek (BBC Books, 2021)
- Doctor Who: The Chimes of Midnight (BBC Books, 2025)
- Doctor Who: Jubilee (BBC Books, 2025)

=== Critical guidebooks ===
- Wanting to Believe: A Critical Guide to The X-Files, Millennium and The Lone Gunmen (2009)
- Running Through Corridors: Rob and Toby's Marathon Watch of Doctor Who (Volume 1: The 60s) (with Toby Hadoke) (2010)

=== Audio plays ===
==== Afternoon Play ====
- "About Colin" (2 February 2000)
- "Inappropriate Behaviour" (17 August 2002)
- "Afternoons with Roger" (11 June 2003)
- "Forever Mine" (14 June 2004)
- "Teacher's Pet" (28 June 2005)
- "Towards the End of the Morning" (4 & 11 September 2005)
- "Odd" (19 April 2006)

==== Doctor Who plays for Big Finish Productions ====
- The Holy Terror (Sixth Doctor, Frobisher; November 2000)
- The Chimes of Midnight (Eighth Doctor, Charley; February 2002)
- The Maltese Penguin (Sixth Doctor, Frobisher; June 2002)
- Jubilee (Sixth Doctor, Evelyn Smythe; January 2003)
- Deadline (Doctor Who Unbound, featuring Sir Derek Jacobi; September 2003)
- Scherzo (Eighth Doctor, Charley; December 2003)
- My Own Private Wolfgang (Sixth Doctor, Evelyn Smythe; September 2007)
