= James Daniel Wilson =

British actor

James Daniel Wilson is an English actor and writer in various media including lip sync translations of foreign films into English.

Films James has written for include The Door starring Helen Mirren and directed by István Szabó, Vicky and The Treasure of the Gods and Vicky the Viking. As an actor, he has worked extensively in theatre, TV, film and voice-overs.

Theatre credits include the inaugural production of Home at the National Theatre of Scotland in conjunction with Frantic Assembly and the role of Giles Ralston in the West End production of The Mousetrap. James worked with Kali Theatre Company on the site-specific piece My Daughter's Trial. The show played to sell-out audiences in the old courtroom above Browns Restaurants on St Martin's Lane, London.

James's voice can be heard in the feature-length animated films Gnomeo and Juliet and Minions.

His computer game credits include the voices of Nowe in Drakengard 2, Xavier in Rule of Rose, and Horace in The Last Story.

James regularly records for Dorling Kindersley as a Lucasfilm-approved voice. He has recorded a number of DK Readers including Star Wars The Clone Wars - Jedi in Training, Forces of Darkness and Jedi Heroes, and continues to record new titles.

James has also recorded a number of unabridged audiobooks including Alan Hollinghurst's The Stranger's Child, the follow-up to his Booker Prize winning The Line of Beauty. "Wilson is a triumph, bringing character's voices recognisably from childhood to old age... mesmerisingly examined for meaning," said Karen Robinson of The Sunday Times on his reading of The Stranger's Child. Other titles include John Boyne's Crippen, Herbie Brennan's The Ruler of the Realm and Faerie Lord, F. E. Higgins' The Eyeball Collector, The Bone Magician and The Black Book of Secrets, which received the Merit award at the CBI Book of the Year Awards, Matt Haig's The Runaway Troll and Shadow Forest, Janet Foxley's Muncle Trogg and the role of Cooper in Mike Gayle's The Life and Soul of the Party.

For years, James played Paul, one of the new generation of The Tomorrow People in the audio series by Big Finish Productions. The audio series was cancelled due to the discontinuation of a licensing arrangement with Fremantle Media Enterprises in December 2007. Wilson also guest-starred in Big Finish Production's audio productions Sapphire and Steel - The School, as Max, and in Doctor Who, as Brian, in The Rapture.
