= The Mystery of the Missing Hour =

Audio drama

Big Finish Productions audio drama
- Series: Sapphire & Steel
- Release no.: 2.6
- Written by: Joseph Lidster
- Directed by: Nigel Fairs
- Produced by: Jason Haigh-Ellery; Nigel Fairs
- Length: 120 mins

The Mystery of the Missing Hour is a Big Finish Productions audio drama based on the popular British science fiction television series Sapphire & Steel.

== Plot ==
Sapphire and Steel arrive in Cairo, 1926 to solve an impossible murder...

== Cast ==
- Steel — David Warner
- Sapphire — Susannah Harker
- Narrator — Colin Baker
- Lady Marjorie — Sarah Douglas
- Arthur — Ian Hallard
- Jane — Cate Debenham Taylor
- Cornelius — Ian Brooker
- MC — Nigel Fairs

== Notes ==
- In the Sapphire and Steel timeline, this story takes place between Perfect Day and Second Sight.
- At the beginning of the fourth episode, in a fourth wall breaking moment in which they play themselves, Cate Debenham Taylor says to Sarah Douglas, "I thought I recognised your name. Weren't you the baddie in Superman II? I used to love that film!" This refers to her role as the Kryptonian criminal Ursa in both the aforementioned film and its predecessor, Superman. Later, Douglas mentions Murder, She Wrote and the fact that Angela Lansbury's character Jessica Fletcher happened to come across a murder in every episode of the series. In real life, Douglas appeared in the Murder, She Wrote Season Two episode "Sing a Song of Murder" in 1985.
