= Nigel Fairs =

British actor, writer and producer

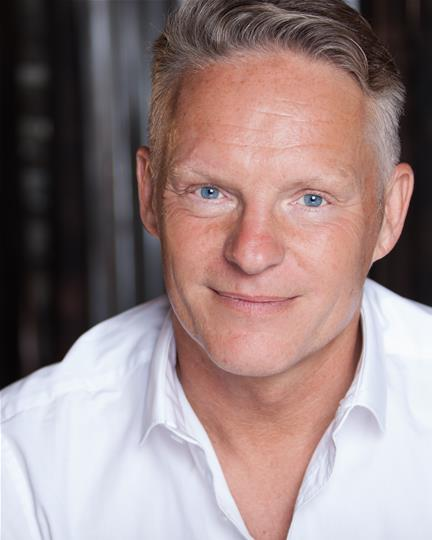
Nigel Fairs

Nigel Fairs is a British actor and writer.

He trained at Bretton Hall College and his theatre credits include stage production of Translations at The National Theatre, Inspector Morse in the UK tour of House of Ghosts, Dr Watson in To Kill a Canary at the Kenton Theatre, Henley), Nurse Ratched in One Flew Over the Cuckoo's Nest at The English Theatre Frankfurt, Christopher Wren in The Mousetrap in the West End, John Haigh in his own award-winning play In Conversation with an Acid Bath Murderer and Gavin in another award-winner, My Gay Best Friend (which he co-wrote with Louise Jameson. Television credits include EastEnders, Emmerdale, Silent Witness and Unforgotten. Film credits include Angels on the Ceiling, In From The Side, Ashens and the Polybius Heist and Do You Have A License To Save This Planet?.

He has also worked for Big Finish Productions, as an actor, writer, director and composer, and was the producer of their Sapphire and Steel and The Tomorrow People ranges. A common style of both ranges is an increase in emotional content, the exploration of ongoing themes and, in the case of The Tomorrow People, long-running story arcs. As well as writing individual stories for both these ranges, he has contributed to the company’s Doctor Who range in February 2007 with The Blue Tooth, and later The Catalyst and Empathy Games, both starring Louise Jameson. In 2007, he contributed to the short-story collection Short Trips: Snapshots. Prior to his work for Big Finish, he was a regular writer and director for BBV. In 2008 he appeared in the BBV film Zygon: When Being You Just Isn't Enough.

In 2020 he wrote and produced two ongoing audio podcasts dramas, The Pogley Wood Murders and Moira Moments.

== Big Finish Productions ==
His work for Big Finish Productions includes:

As a writer:

- Doctor Who - The Companion Chronicles: The Blue Tooth
- Doctor Who - The Companion Chronicles: The Catalyst
- Doctor Who: Cuddlesome
- Doctor Who - The Companion Chronicles: Empathy Games
- Doctor Who - The Companion Chronicles: The Time Vampire
- Doctor Who - The Companion Chronicles: The Child
- Jago and Litefoot: Jago in Love
- Doctor Who: The Abandoned (with Louise Jameson)
- Doctor Who - Short Trips: Time Tunnel
- Doctor Who - Short Trips: The Toy
- Doctor Who - Short Trips: Prime Winner
- Jago and Litefoot: Jago and Son

As a director:

- Sapphire & Steel: Dead Man Walking
- Sapphire & Steel: The Mystery of the Missing Hour
- Sapphire & Steel: Daisy Chain
- Sapphire & Steel: All Fall Down
- Sapphire & Steel: The Lighthouse
- Sapphire & Steel: The School
- Sapphire & Steel: The Surest Poison
- Sapphire & Steel: Water Like a Stone
- Doctor Who: Scaredy Cat
- Doctor Who - The Companion Chronicles: Mother Russia
- Doctor Who - The Companion Chronicles: Helicon Prime
- Doctor Who - The Companion Chronicles: Old Soldiers
- Doctor Who - The Companion Chronicles: The Catalyst
- Doctor Who - The Companion Chronicles: The Great Space Elevator
- Doctor Who - The Companion Chronicles: Empathy Games
- Doctor Who - The Companion Chronicles: The Transit of Venus
- Doctor Who - The Companion Chronicles: The Magician's Oath
- Doctor Who - The Companion Chronicles: The Glorious Revolution
- Doctor Who - The Companion Chronicles: The Time Vampire
- Doctor Who - The Companion Chronicles: The Child
- Bernice Summerfield: The Adventure of the Diogenes Damsel
- Dark Shadows: The Blind Painter

As an actor:

- Bernice Summerfield: Walking to Babylon
- Bernice Summerfield: Dragons' Wrath
- Doctor Who: The Shadow of the Scourge
- Doctor Who: Nekromanteia
- Gallifrey: Pandora
- Dark Shadows: Final Judgement
- Ashens and the Polybius Heist
