= Caroline Morris =

British actress (born 1974)

Caroline Morris is a British actress who played the part of the companion Erimem in a range of audio dramas by Big Finish Productions based on the BBC television series Doctor Who.

As well as playing Erimem, Morris also appeared in Zagreus as Mary Elson, the Bernice Summerfield adventure The Kingdom of the Blind as 26 and the Sapphire and Steel story Perfect Day as Jennifer.

== Erimem ==
=== Main Range ===
- The Eye of the Scorpion (2001)
- The Church and the Crown (2002)
- Nekromanteia (2003)
- The Axis of Insanity (2004)
- The Roof of the World (2004)
- Three's A Crowd (2005)
- The Council Of Nicaea (2005)
- The Kingmaker (2006)
- Son of the Dragon (2007)
- The Mind's Eye (2007)
- The Bride of Peladon (2008)

=== Others ===
- No Place Like Home (2002), a one-episode Doctor Who audio story given away free with an issue of Doctor Who Magazine
- The Veiled Leopard (2006), a special release featuring Morris as Erimem, Nicola Bryant as Peri, Sophie Aldred as Ace, and Philip Olivier as Hex. The Fifth Doctor has sent Peri and Erimem to Monte Carlo in 1966 to prevent the Veiled Leopard diamond from being stolen, while the Seventh Doctor has sent Ace and Hex to the same time and place in order to steal the Veiled Leopard diamond.
