= Doctor Who: The Fifth Doctor Adventures =

Doctor Who radio drama

The Fifth Doctor Adventures

Big Finish Productions audio drama
- Series: Doctor Who
- Featuring: Fifth Doctor
- Executive producers: Jason Haigh-Ellery; Nicholas Briggs
- Release date: January 2003 (retroactively); November 2020 (actual)

The Fifth Doctor Adventures is a Big Finish Productions audio play series based on the television series Doctor Who. It sees the return of Peter Davison reprising his role as the Fifth Doctor.

== History ==
In 1999, beginning with the story "The Sirens of Time", Big Finish Productions began producing a series of audio adventures featuring the Fifth Doctor, Sixth Doctor and Seventh Doctor. For 22 years these stories continued collectively known as Big Finish's "Main Range". In May 2020, Big Finish announced the main range would conclude in March 2021 and subsequently replaced with regular releases of each Doctor's adventures continuing in their own respective ranges. Several previously released special titles were retroactively reallocated into these new ranges by Big Finish.

== Cast and characters ==
List indicator

This section includes characters who will appear or have appeared in at least one season.

- A green cell indicates the actor is a main cast member.
- A red cell indicates the actor is a recurring cast member.
- A light blue cell indicates the actor is a guest or special guest cast member.

Actor	Character	Appearances												
Actor	Character	Sp.	5DB	WS	TLR&OS	Forty		CoI	ItN	TDT	TGB	HL	HS	S&A
Actor	Character	Sp.	5DB	WS	TLR&OS	V1	V2	CoI	ItN	TDT	TGB	HL	HS	S&A
Peter Davison	The Doctor	✓	✓	✓	✓	✓	✓	✓	✓	✓	✓	✓	✓	✓
Paul McGann	The Doctor											✓		
Sarah Sutton	Nyssa	✓	✓		✓	✓	✓	✓	✓	✓	✓	✓		✓
Matthew Waterhouse	Adric		✓		✓	✓	✓			✓	✓	✓		
Janet Fielding	Tegan		✓		✓	✓	✓	✓	✓	✓	✓	✓	✓	
Louise Jameson	Leela			✓										
Ciara Janson	Abby			✓										
Laura Doddington	Zara			✓										
George Watkins	Marc				✓									
Mark Strickson	Vislor Turlough						✓						✓	
Jon Culshaw	The Brigadier						✓							
Jon Culshaw	The Master						✓							
Jon Culshaw	Kamelion						✓							
Nicholas Briggs	Daleks				✓									
Nicholas Briggs	Cybermen					✓								
Nicholas Briggs	Ice Warriors					✓								

=== Notable Guests ===
- Caroline Morris as Erimem
- Mark Donovan as Shayde

== Episodes ==
=== Specials ===
No.	Title	Directed by	Written by	Featuring	Released
1	"No Place Like Home"	Gary Russell	Iain McLaughlin	Fifth Doctor, Erimem, Shayde	January 2003
2	"Cuddlesome"	Barnaby Edwards	Nigel Fairs	Fifth Doctor	March 2008
3	"Return to the Web Planet"	Barnaby Edwards	Daniel O'Mahony	Fifth Doctor, Nyssa, Zarbi, Menoptera	December 2008

=== The Fifth Doctor Box Set (2014) ===
No.	Title	Directed by	Written by	Featuring	Released
1	"Psychodrome"	Ken Bentley	Jonathan Morris	Fifth Doctor, Adric, Nyssa, Tegan	August 2014
2	"Iterations of I"	Ken Bentley	John Dorney	Fifth Doctor, Adric, Nyssa, Tegan	August 2014

=== Wicked Sisters (2020) ===
No.	Title	Directed by	Written by	Featuring	Released
1	"The Garden of Storms"	Lisa Bowerman	Simon Guerrier	Fifth Doctor, Leela, Abby, Zara	November 2020
2	"The Moonrakers"	Lisa Bowerman	Simon Guerrier	Fifth Doctor, Leela, Abby, Zara	November 2020
3	"The People Made of Smoke"	Lisa Bowerman	Simon Guerrier	Fifth Doctor, Leela, Abby, Zara	November 2020

=== The Lost Resort and Other Stories (2021) ===
No.	Title	Directed by	Written by	Featuring	Released
1	"The Lost Resort"	Scott Handcock	AK Benedict	Fifth Doctor, Nyssa, Tegan, Marc, Adric	September 2021
2	"The Perils of Nellie Bly"	Scott Handcock	Sarah Ward	Fifth Doctor, Nyssa, Tegan, Marc	September 2021
3	"Nightmare of the Daleks"	Samuel Clemens	Martyn Waites	Fifth Doctor, Nyssa, Tegan, Marc, Daleks	September 2021

=== Forty (2022) ===
No.	Title	Directed by	Written by	Featuring	Released
Volume 1
1	"Secrets of Telos"	Ken Bentley	Matt Fitton	Fifth Doctor, Nyssa, Tegan, Cybermen	January 2022
2	"God of War"	Ken Bentley	Sarah Grochala	Fifth Doctor, Adric, Nyssa, Tegan, Ice Warriors	January 2022
–	"Interlude: I, Kamelion"	Read by: Dan Starkey	Dominic Martin	Fifth Doctor, Turlough, Kamelion	January 2022
Volume 2
3	"The Auton Infinity"	Ken Bentley	Tim Foley	Fifth Doctor, Tegan, Turlough, Kamelion, The Brigadier, Autons, The Master	September 2022

=== Conflicts of Interest (2023) ===
No.	Title	Directed by	Written by	Featuring	Released
1	"Friendly Fire"	Ken Bentley	John Dorney	Fifth Doctor, Nyssa, Tegan	April 2023
2	"The Edge of the War"	Ken Bentley	Jonathan Barnes	Fifth Doctor, Nyssa, Tegan	April 2023
–	"Interlude: Gobbledegook"	Read by: Dan Starkey	Frazer Lee	Fifth Doctor	April 2023

=== In the Night (2023) ===
No.	Title	Directed by	Written by	Featuring	Released
1	"Pursuit of the Nightjar"	Ken Bentley	Tim Foley	Fifth Doctor, Nyssa, Tegan	September 2023
2	"Resistor"	Ken Bentley	Sarah Grochala	Fifth Doctor, Nyssa, Tegan	September 2023

=== The Dream Team (2024) ===
No.	Title	Directed by	Written by	Featuring	Released
1	"The Merfolk Murders"	Ken Bentley	Tim Foley	Fifth Doctor, Nyssa, Tegan, Adric	April 2024
2	"Dream Team"	Ken Bentley	Lizzie Hopley	Fifth Doctor, Nyssa, Tegan, Adric	April 2024
–	"Interlude: Meanwhile, Turlough"	Read by: Dan Starkey	Jonathan Blum	Fifth Doctor, Tegan, Turlough	April 2024

=== The Great Beyond (2024) ===
A second boxset is scheduled for release in September 2024. Big Finish's Creative Director Nicholas Briggs described them as "...really imaginative, celebratory adventures that feel like Classic Doctor Who turned right up to eleven, in the very best of ways".

No.	Title	Directed by	Written by	Featuring	Released
1	"Part 1"	Ken Bentley	James Kettle	Fifth Doctor, Nyssa, Tegan, Adric	September 2024
2	"Part 2"	Ken Bentley	James Kettle	Fifth Doctor, Nyssa, Tegan, Adric	September 2024
3	"Part 3"	Ken Bentley	James Kettle	Fifth Doctor, Nyssa, Tegan, Adric	September 2024
4	"Part 4"	Ken Bentley	James Kettle	Fifth Doctor, Nyssa, Tegan, Adric	September 2024
5	"Part 5"	Ken Bentley	James Kettle	Fifth Doctor, Nyssa, Tegan, Adric	September 2024
6	"Part 6"	Ken Bentley	James Kettle	Fifth Doctor, Nyssa, Tegan, Adric	September 2024

=== Hooklight (2025) ===
On 23 May 2024, Big Finish announced their slate of boxsets for 2025. Senior Producer John Ainsworth said "...in 2025, Peter Davison stars in a 12-part Fifth Doctor story for the first time ever. It's an epic featuring new worlds, new creatures and a searing light that could burn everything to dust." The two boxsets are scheduled for release in April and May 2025, respectively.

No.	Title	Directed by	Written by	Featuring	Released
Part 1
1	"Part 1"	Ken Bentley	Tim Foley	Fifth Doctor, Eighth Doctor, Tegan, Nyssa, Adric	April 2025
2	"Part 2"	Ken Bentley	Tim Foley	Fifth Doctor, Eighth Doctor, Tegan, Nyssa, Adric	April 2025
3	"Part 3"	Ken Bentley	Tim Foley	Fifth Doctor, Eighth Doctor, Tegan, Nyssa, Adric	April 2025
4	"Part 4"	Ken Bentley	Tim Foley	Fifth Doctor, Eighth Doctor, Tegan, Nyssa, Adric	April 2025
5	"Part 5"	Ken Bentley	Tim Foley	Fifth Doctor, Eighth Doctor, Tegan, Nyssa, Adric	April 2025
6	"Part 6"	Ken Bentley	Tim Foley	Fifth Doctor, Eighth Doctor, Tegan, Nyssa, Adric	April 2025
Part 2
1	"Part 7"	Ken Bentley	Tim Foley	Fifth Doctor, Eighth Doctor, Tegan, Nyssa, Adric	May 2025
2	"Part 8"	Ken Bentley	Tim Foley	Fifth Doctor, Eighth Doctor, Tegan, Nyssa, Adric	May 2025
3	"Part 9"	Ken Bentley	Tim Foley	Fifth Doctor, Eighth Doctor, Tegan, Nyssa, Adric	May 2025
4	"Part 10"	Ken Bentley	Tim Foley	Fifth Doctor, Eighth Doctor, Tegan, Nyssa, Adric	May 2025
5	"Part 11"	Ken Bentley	Tim Foley	Fifth Doctor, Eighth Doctor, Tegan, Nyssa, Adric	May 2025
6	"Part 12"	Ken Bentley	Tim Foley	Fifth Doctor, Eighth Doctor, Tegan, Nyssa, Adric	May 2025

=== Helter Skelter (2026) ===
No.	Title	Directed by	Written by	Featuring	Released
1	"Field of Miracles"	Ken Bentley	Lauren Mooney and Stewart Pringle	Fifth Doctor, Tegan, Turlough	April 2026
2	"Helter Skelter"	Ken Bentley	James Moran	Fifth Doctor, Tegan, Turlough	April 2026
3	"Land of Fools"	Ken Bentley	Lauren Mooney and Stewart Pringle	Fifth Doctor, Tegan, Turlough	April 2026

=== Shock and Awe (2026) ===
No.	Title	Directed by	Written by	Featuring	Released
1	"Lair of the Voltaxa"	Ken Bentley	Roland Moore	Fifth Doctor, Nyssa	September 2026
2	"March of the Colossus"	Samuel Clemens	Alan Ronald	Fifth Doctor, Nyssa	September 2026

== Awards and nominations ==
Name of the award ceremony, year presented, category, nominee(s) of the award, and the result of the nomination
Award ceremony	Year	Category	Work(s)	Result	Ref.
Audio and Radio Industry Awards	2026	Best Drama or Fiction	Hooklight	Pending	
Scribe Awards	2015	Best Audio	Iterations of I	Won	
Scribe Awards	2022	Best Audio	The Lost Resort	Nominated	
Scribe Awards	2024	Best Audio	Pursuit of the Nightjar	Nominated	
