= Blake's 7 (audio drama) =

British audio dramas

There have been three producers of Blake's 7 audio dramas: BBC Radio, B7 Productions and Big Finish Productions.

== BBC Radio ==
In 1998, the series returned to the BBC on the radio. The stories are set between the season D episodes "Stardrive" and "Animals". They were broadcast on BBC Radio 4. The roles of Dayna and Soolin, played by Josette Simon and Glynis Barber in the TV series, have been recast with Angela Bruce and Paula Wilcox.

No.	Title	Directed by	Written by	Released
1	"The Sevenfold Crown"	Brian Lighthill	Barry Letts	January 1998
Raiding their old enemy Servalan's HQ, the crew discover that she possesses a jewel that belongs to an ancient, longlost crown - a mystical artifact of indescribable power. The crown had the power to amplify the wearer's own psychic energies a millionfold - and with one jewel safely in her possession, Servalan is determined to acquire the circlet of metal containing the other six. But the rebels are in pursuit of the ultimate goal - the total freedom that the Sevenfold Crown can give. And if Avon does reach the Crown before Servalan, will absolute power corrupt him absolutely?
2	"The Syndeton Experiment"	Brian Lighthill	Barry Letts	April 1999
Avon and the Crew are tired of running. They want to negotiate with the Federation, gain protection and settle down on a planet of their own. And the wealthy Syndexia seems just the place to do it. Or so they think. It turns out that the Crew's arch enemy Servalan is ahead of them - but it's not the wealth of Syndexia she's after. Servalan is on the trail of a certain Doctor Rossum, inventor of the nanochip. Easily implanted in the brain, the nanochip will give its controller total power over that person. And if nanochips were embedded in a whole population...? The race is on in the deadly game. Who will reach Doctor Rossum first - Avon or Servalan?

In 2006, B7 Productions announced that it had recorded a series of 36 five-minute audio adventures with an entirely new cast. The new series was broadcast on BBC Radio 7 as three hour-long episodes.

No.	Title	Directed by	Written by	Released
1	"Rebel"	Andrew Mark Sewell, Duncan McAlpine, Dominic Devine, Alistair Lock	Ben Aaronovitch	December 2007
In the third century of the second calendar, the galactic Federation, once a beacon of democracy and peace, has become a corrupt tyranny. Freedom and Justice are things of the past. Roj Blake stood up for ordinary people. When the establishment tried intimidation, he laughed in their faces; when they tried to crush him, he fought back. They tried to brainwash him into obedience, but he broke their conditioning. Finally, they framed him for crimes he didn't commit and sentenced him to permanent exile on the notorious prison planet of Cygnus Alpha. The Federation thinks it has seen the last of Roj Blake... The Federation will wish it had.
2	"Traitor"	Andrew Mark Sewell, Duncan McAlpine, Dominic Devine, Alistair Lock	Marc Platt	December 2007
Roj Blake is on the run... He has a ship, but the ship has plans of its own. He has a crew, but who are his friends and who are his enemies? Blake thought space meant freedom, but space is cold, cruel and steeped in blood. The power of the Federation reaches further and deeper then Blake dared imagine... Freedom is nowhere to be found.
3	"Liberator"	Andrew Mark Sewell, Duncan McAlpine, Dominic Devine, Alistair Lock	James Swallow	January 2008
The Federation's grip is tightening and Roj Blake and the crew of the Liberator have nowhere left to hide. As time runs out, old friendships are shattered and new alliances are forged. Choices are made and battle lines are drawn across the galaxy. A path of betrayal, lies and deceit leads to only one destination... Toward a deadly confrontation that will change everything.

== The early years ==
B7 Productions also produced series of 30-minute prequel audio episodes, which explored the earlier histories of the central characters. These were broadcast on BBC Radio 4 Extra from 2010.

#	Title	Cast	Writer	Broadcast Date
1.1	When Vila Met Gan	Michael Keating as Vila, Owen Aaronovitch as Gan and Alistair Lock as Zen	Ben Aaronovitch	4 June 2010
1.2	Point of No Return	Craig Kelly as Travis, Jake Maskall as Sub. Lt. Garcia and Peter Guinness as Carl Varon	James Swallow	31 December 2011
1.3	Eye of the Machine	Colin Salmon as Avon, Keeley Hawes as Anna Grant, Geoffrey Palmer as Ensor and Alistair Lock as Zen	Ben Aaronovitch	31 May 2010
1.4.1	Blood & Earth	Jan Chappell as Aunty Cally Secundus, Amy Humphreys as Ariane Cally, Barbara Joslyn as Jorden Cally and Julian Wadham as Commissioner Van Reich	Ben Aaronovitch	1 June 2010
1.4.2	Flag & Flame	Susannah Doyle as Katrina "Skate" Cally, Natalie Walter as Merrin Cally and Michael Cochrane as Commander Gresham	Marc Platt	7 January 2012
1.5.1	The Dust Run	Carrie Dobro as Jenna Stannis and Benedict Cumberbatch as Max Townsend	Simon Guerrier	2 June 2010
1.5.2	The Trial	Carrie Dobro as Jenna Stannis, Stephen Lord as Nick and Benedict Cumberbatch as Max Townsend	Simon Guerrier	3 June 2010
2.1	Escape Velocity	Zoe Tapper as Pilot, Jason Merrells as Healer, Sam Woodward as Gunner, Pamela Banks as Tech, Tracy-Ann Oberman as Avatar and Alistair Lock as Zen	James Swallow	24 December 2011

== BBC Audiobooks ==
Audiobook readings novelising episodes from season A of the TV series released by BBC Audio.

#	Title	Narrator	Writer	Release date
1	The Way Back	Gareth Thomas	Trevor Hoyle	April 2009
2	Cygnus Alpha	Paul Darrow	Trevor Hoyle	April 2009
3	Project Avalon	Jacqueline Pearce & Paul Darrow	Trevor Hoyle	May 2013

== The Liberator Chronicles ==
A series of enhanced audiobooks from Big Finish Productions with members of the TV series reprising their roles.

Volumes 1, 4, 7 and 10 are set during Season A. Volumes 2, 5, 8 and 11 are set during Season B. Volumes 3, 6, 9 and 12 are set during Season C. The special episode "Remnants" is available only on the Big Finish website.

No.	Title	Directed by	Written by	Released
Volume 1
1	"The Turing Test"	Lisa Bowerman	Simon Guerrier	February 2012
After evading an attack by Cassini Pirates, the Liberator heads to the rogue moon of Quentil, where Avon and Vila infiltrate a top secret Federation science facility. Vila assumes the guise of Doctor Yarding Gill, an expert in digital memory. And Avon is his 'creation' - a super-advanced android that could pass for human. In fact, he does... Can they maintain the ruse for long enough to complete their mission? And will the Cassini Pirates catch up with them?
2	"Solitary"	Lisa Bowerman	Nigel Fairs	February 2012
Vila is in solitary confinement. His friends have abandoned him, his only contact with the world outside is Nyrron, a scientist from the planet Auron. Amnesiac and confused, Vila attempts to piece together recent events... A mission to Dulcimer 4. An important meeting. And a visit to the jungle world of Terrulis Major. In the depths of the foliage, the truth is waiting. And it's more terrifying than Vila could possible have imagined...
3	"Counterfeit"	Lisa Bowerman	Peter Anghelides	February 2012
The Bovee Mining Facility: A Federation slave camp worked by disgraced scientists. The planet shouldn't be of interest but it is: Avon's investigations reveal that it's rich in Illusium, a mineral that can change from one substance to another. With it, the Federation could be invulnerable. Blake teleports down to Bovee, but gets more than he bargained for. There's another visitor to the facility - and his presence changes the whole game...
Volume 2
1	"The Magnificent Four"	Lisa Bowerman	Simon Guerrier	August 2012
A mission to steal data from the planet Mogul goes badly wrong when Cally and Avon are outflanked and outgunned. And then they are teleported to safety - to an alien spaceship stolen from The System, which is crewed by Gilden Trent and his small team of rebels. For Avon it’s the opportunity to start over again without Blake. But can Trent be trusted?
2	"False Positive"	Lisa Bowerman	Eddie Robson	August 2012
Dr Lian has a mysterious new patient – a man who was found shot in the leg near Engel City, a man who is delirious and talking about the most extraordinary acts of rebellion. She prescribes drugs and the use of the alleviator – a device that will dig deep into his memories – to unlock the truth about Carlin Guzan. But the truth that she exposes is far more shocking than she bargained for...
3	"Wolf"	Lisa Bowerman	Nigel Fairs	August 2012
Some time ago, Blake and his crew were helped by a revered Auron scientist named Gustav Nyrron. He stayed aboard the Liberator for a time and then disappeared. Cally wants to know what happened to Nyrron, and only Servalan knows the answers.
Volume 3
1	"The Armageddon Storm, Parts 1-3"	Ken Bentley	Mark Wright and Cavan Scott	February 2013
Del Grant, mercenary. Kerr Avon, freedom fighter. Former friends. Former enemies. Linked forever thanks to Grant's sister, the woman Avon loved. The woman Avon killed. Now their paths cross again. Grant has learnt of the existence of the Armageddon Storm, a terrifying new Federation superweapon. Avon finds himself in a race against time, with his crew's lives hanging in the balance. But what will Grant do when he finds out about the blood on Avon's hands?
Volume 4
1	"Promises"	Lisa Bowerman	Nigel Fairs	May 2013
Saurian Minor. A dead rock in space. Cally is alone with Travis, Blake's mortal enemy, both trapped on this desolate world - and someone has brought them here for a reason. As they delve into the past, a long-hidden secret that links them both is uncovered. Gradually, the truth about Scetona Clorensis will be revealed...
2	"Epitaph"	Lisa Bowerman	Scott Harrison	May 2013
When the Liberator picks up a distress call from a stricken strip, Jenna and Vila teleport across. For Jenna, it's the chance for a reunion with a fellow smuggler. But the cry for help is not what it appears, and Jenna will meet the surviving members of her family. The reunion will take her on a deadly mission - one from which not everyone will come out alive...
3	"Kerr"	Lisa Bowerman	Nick Wallace	May 2013
Supreme Commander Servalan believes she has a vital insight into the Liberator crew - a clone of Avon. He looks the same. He sounds the same. He even appears to think the same. And he offers to spring a trap that will bring down Blake and his crew. But can the clone be trusted?
Volume 5
1	"Logic"	Ken Bentley and Lisa Bowerman	Simon Guerrier	August 2013
Pol Astat Constable is an ordinary woman living an ordinary life in a domed city on Earth. Her very ordinary job involves looking for errors of logic in computer code. Then one day an intruder breaks into her rooms and changes everything forever. His name is Kerr Avon, and he is taking her outside to face a terrible secret. Pol's life is ordinary no more.
2	"Risk Management"	Ken Bentley and Lisa Bowerman	Una McCormack	August 2013
Blake and Jenna come to the aid of the planet Sutskar, which has fought off the shackles of the Federation and won independence and freedom. But the ruined world needs finance, and so the sale of rare Galveston crystals is vital to its future and any hope of rebuilding. The only person trusted to broker the deal is Roj Blake... But Blake is not prepared for the secrets and lies he will uncover.
3	"Three"	Ken Bentley and Lisa Bowerman	James Goss	August 2013
Cullen is a journalist in search of a big story - and he has landed the scoop of a lifetime. An interview with Supreme Commander Servalan herself. Summoned to Space Command Headquarters, Cullen is able to ask the Supreme Commander any question he chooses. But as Servalan takes him through her life, little does Cullen know how his own story will actually end...
Volume 6
1	"Incentive"	Ken Bentley	Peter Anghelides	October 2013
The Liberator crew are recovering from a Galactic War and searching for their lost members Blake and Jenna. But it’s a search that leads them into terrible danger…
2	"Jenna's Story"	Ken Bentley	Steve Lyons	October 2013
Jenna's story is finally told - from her escape from the Liberator during the Galactic War, to her determination to continue the fight against the Federation alone… with the odds stacked against her.
3	"Blake's Story"	Ken Bentley	Mark Wright and Cavan Scott	October 2013
Blake's story is finally told - from his escape from the Liberator during the Galactic War, to his new life as a troubled, scarred man on a distant rebel world…
Volume 7
1	"Spy"	Ken Bentley and Lisa Bowerman	Simon Guerrier	February 2014
Cally and Vila are undercover on the Federation-controlled world Cortol Four. It's a mission with an irresistible prize. And it's a mission that goes horribly wrong...
2	"Disorder"	Ken Bentley and Lisa Bowerman	Eddie Robson	February 2014
Division Three. A space station in the process of being decommissioned. Its archives contain key records of the Federation's enemies - and Vila and Avon intend to steal it.
3	"The Hard Road"	Ken Bentley and Lisa Bowerman	James Swallow	February 2014
Blake decides it is time to fight back against the Federation - and to fight back with allies.
Volume 8
1	"President"	Ken Bentley and Lisa Bowerman	Simon Guerrier	May 2014
Alone together, two Federation officials at last share the truth. Supreme Commander Servalan agrees to explain to Secretary Rontane how she set up the President. And when she is done, Servalan’s executioners will be waiting...
2	"The Sea of Iron"	Ken Bentley and Lisa Bowerman	Marc Platt	May 2014
Cally wishes to find Captain Mani Yalleg, her instructor when she was training to be a freedom fighter. His trail leads to the Goliath System, where Cally will discover a shocking lost secret from her past...
3	"Spoils"	Ken Bentley and Lisa Bowerman	James Goss	May 2014
Roj Blake dreams of bringing down the Federation. Of toppling the President and Servalan and establishing a free society. What would happen if he won? He is about to find out.
Volume 9
1	"Defector"	Ken Bentley and Lisa Bowerman	Mark Wright and Cavan Scott	August 2014
Avon orders Tarrant and new crewmember Del Grant to assassinate a Federation figurehead. Has he gone too far this time?
2	"Planetfall"	Ken Bentley and Lisa Bowerman	Mark Wright and Cavan Scott	August 2014
Can Avon and Cally get off Space Station Arcadia before it crashes into the planet below?
3	"Secrets"	Ken Bentley and Lisa Bowerman	Mark Wright and Cavan Scott	August 2014
With the future of the rebellion in jeopardy, Vila and Grant infiltrate an illegal arms bazaar – but who exactly is Solvin Tavac and what does he want with the crew of the Liberator?
Volume 10
1	"Velandra"	Ken Bentley and Lisa Bowerman	Steve Lyons	November 2014
Blake is having bad dreams: a swamp, wolves, a woman called Velandra… and Travis. Could this be a memory that was erased by the Federation?
2	"Retribution"	Ken Bentley and Lisa Bowerman	Andrew Smith	November 2014
A distress call leads Avon and Vila to an old tracking station on the moon of Lorean. It was sent by Ragnus Lang, formerly Vila’s partner-in-crime. And now Lang needs Blake’s help.
3	"Ministry of Peace"	Ken Bentley and Lisa Bowerman	Una McCormack	November 2014
The Liberator crew are on the planet Speranza to assist its new interim government. But is the planet a beacon of hope in the fight against the Federation – or is Speranza’s history about to take a darker path?
Volume 11
1	"Brother"	Lisa Bowerman and Louise Jameson	Nigel Fairs	March 2015
Auron scientist Gustav Nyrron is back aboard the Liberator, on his way home. But Avon does not trust him, and soon a drugged Nyrron wakes to find himself in Avon’s clutches on a devastated world. In this desert, their pasts are waiting for them… and a devastating truth that will shake their very beliefs to the core.
2	"Poison"	Lisa Bowerman and Louise Jameson	Iain McLaughlin	March 2015
Federation Freighter Antares is a ship with many secrets. Why is it making regular runs to a heavily guarded frontier world? Why is the hold out of bounds? And who is watching the crew’s every move? Events take a dangerous turn when two new recruits come on board. Will Jance and Voss survive their very first mission together?
3	"Escape from Destiny"	Lisa Bowerman and Louise Jameson	Andrew Smith	March 2015
When the Liberator receives a distress signal from a planet it once helped save, Cally and Vila journey to a civilisation on the brink of collapse. There, they encounter Pasco, a scientist Cally first met years ago. The Federation is closing on Destiny - but should Vila and Cally stand in the way this time?
X	"Remnants"	Ken Bentley	Simon Guerrier	September 2015
After a disastrous mission to the planet Laresh, most of the crew has been wiped out. Avon and Jenna are the sole survivors, reunited aboard the Liberator. But what happens next? With their plans in tatters, do Blake’s Two stay together… or go their separate ways and seek refuge in a galaxy pitted against them?
Volume 12
1	"Corners of the Mind"	Lisa Bowerman	Andy Lane	April 2016
Avon is trapped in a labyrinth full of puzzles, with no way to teleport to safety and deadly traps at every corner. He needs all his wits to survive, but there is one problem - he is losing his mind with every puzzle, piece by piece, memory by memory.
2	"Capital"	Lisa Bowerman	Guy Adams	April 2016
The Armageddon Storm. A weapon so dreadful that it can lay waste to entire planets. A weapon that Avon has used to hold the Federation to account. A voice from the past brings news of its redeployment… and the fate of Blake. Del Tarrant is sent to Earth to recover both - but will he survive?
3	"Punishment"	Lisa Bowerman	Guy Adams	April 2016
It’s the end of the world and Vila’s father has returned. He isn’t sure what is worse. With the crew of Liberator arrested and Tarrant dead, can Vila rescue the man he hates and save the day? A coward turned hero… with the fate of planet Earth hanging in the balance.

== The Classic Audio Adventures ==
A series of full cast dramas from Big Finish Productions with members of the TV series reprising their roles.

=== Special (2013) ===
A 60-minute special was released in January 2013. It takes place between season B and C of the TV series, directly between the events of "Star One" and "Aftermath". The roles of Zen and Orac, voiced by Peter Tuddenham in the TV series, has been recast with Alistair Lock. It was also released by Big Finish Productions as an eBook in February 2013.

No.	Title	Directed by	Written by	Released
X	"Warship"	Ken Bentley	Peter Anghelides	January 2013
An alien fleet stands poised to invade Federation space. The only vessel available to hold it back is the Liberator, commanded by Roj Blake and his crew. As an intergalactic war breaks out, old enemies become allies, and friends will become separated. And Blake will be forced to leave behind all that matters to him...

=== Series 1 (2014) ===
The first series consisting of six 60-minute episodes were released monthly from January 2014 to June 2014. They are set during season B of the TV series, between "Voice from the Past" and "Gambit". A story arc running across the six episodes concerns the Liberator crew pausing their quest for Star One to track down the Federation's new experimental computer. It also features the introduction of the President, portrayed by Hugh Fraser, a character who was mentioned but never seen in the original series.

No.	Title	Directed by	Written by	Released
Volume 1
1	"Fractures"	Ken Bentley	Justin Richards	January 2014
An attack by Travis and a squad of Federation pursuit ships leaves the Liberator damaged, its engines in desperate need of repair. Blake is forced to take his ship into The Derelict Zone, which is filled with hundreds of drifting spacecraft that never made it out alive... The same fate awaits his crew. Because the time long expected has come... one of them has turned traitor.
2	"Battleground"	Ken Bentley	Andrew Smith	February 2014
Blake and the crew of the Liberator have a new mission - and their target is on Straxis, a planet also known as Battleground 9. Because Straxis is a training ground for thousands of Federation troops, and the Liberator has journeyed directly into their sights. Has Blake finally picked a battle he cannot possibly win?
3	"Drones"	Ken Bentley	Marc Platt	March 2014
The assistance of the Liberator crew is urgently needed on Straxis - but Roj Blake has acute problems of his own… After taking drastic emergency measures, Blake, Vila and Cally teleport back into a war zone in a bid to make new allies. But the Federation is testing advanced new weaponry here. And Vila looks set to be an early target…
4	"Mirror"	Ken Bentley	Peter Anghelides	April 2014
Orac has tracked Space Major Kade – the man who killed Jenna’s father – to the planet Vere. Jenna wants her revenge, but that must wait. Blake needs her to pilot the Liberator to Stellidar Four, where he has a small window of opportunity to solve the mystery of a new Federation device. It’s a daring plan. And it could be the beginning of the end for the Liberator crew.
5	"Cold Fury"	Ken Bentley	Mark Wright & Cavan Scott	May 2014
When Travis scores a victory over the Liberator crew, Blake is willing to risk everything in order to get back what is theirs. The destination is the uninhabited ice world Horst Minor, where eugenics specialist Dr Tirus is working on experiments for the Federation President. Horst Minor has many secrets. And Blake is not going to like what he finds there...
6	"Caged"	Ken Bentley	Mark Wright & Cavan Scott	June 2014
Roj Blake and the President of the Terran Federation stand face to face. Two men with polar opposite political views, meeting for the first and last time. The long crusade is at an end. And Blake stands to lose everything that matters in his life...

=== Series 2 (2014 - 2015) ===
A second series consisting of six 60-minute episodes were released monthly from November 2014 to April 2015. They are set during season C of the TV series, some time after "Rumours of Death" and following on from the Liberator Chronicles volumes 3 and 9. A story arc running across the six episodes concerns the disappearance and subsequent search for Dayna. It sees the return of Tom Chadbon as Del Grant, who originally appeared in the season B episode "Countdown".

No.	Title	Directed by	Written by	Released
Volume 2
1	"Scimitar"	Lisa Bowerman	Trevor Baxendale	November 2014
The crew of the Liberator awaken to find one of their own missing. Where is Dayna? Has their friend been taken or has she deserted them? The search for Dayna leads them to a deserted ship in the middle of a dangerous asteroid field. But what is the secret of the Scimitar and can Avon get every member of his crew out of the asteroid field alive?
2	"Fortuitas"	Lisa Bowerman	George Mann	December 2014
The search for Dayna takes the Liberator to Solace, a former galactic tourist trap fallen on hard times. When he loses a second member of his crew, Avon is forced to investigate a series of mysterious disappearances. As Orac and Del Grant track a radical new movement that is campaigning for the purity of Solace, a deadly trap begins to tighten. The future is Fortuitas. The future is now.
3	"Mindset"	Lisa Bowerman	Jacqueline Rayner	January 2015
A voice is calling in the darkness. A voice that only Cally can hear. Vila has abandoned his crewmates, searching for the mythical water of life. With Cally acting suspiciously, Tarrant and Grant face danger at the heart of paradise. A gift is being offered. A gift that will cost one member of the Liberator crew dearly. But will Cally accept?
4	"Ghost Ship"	Lisa Bowerman	Iain McLaughlin	February 2015
Vila is scared. Of course he is. Vila is always scared. He should feel safe. He is on board the Liberator, the most powerful ship ever constructed. He is home - but he is certainly not alone. Ghostly figures stalk the corridors of the Liberator. Spectres who know Vila’s name. Revenants. Demons. And Vila has nowhere to run.
5	"Devil's Advocate"	Lisa Bowerman	Steve Lyons	March 2015
When Del Tarrant joined the Liberator he thought he’d left his past behind him – the gallant Federation officer with friends in high places. But the past has a habit of catching up on you. A man the Liberator crew thought dead crosses their path, now a fugitive on the run. He brings talk of an alliance, of a brave new future – but is Avon prepared to make a deal with the Devil?
6	"Truth and Lies"	Lisa Bowerman	Justin Richards	April 2015
The search for Dayna has led the crew of the Liberator half way across the galaxy, but now Avon knows why she left them. He knows where she went. He knows what she was looking for. But can he find his missing crewmate before it is too late? The answers lie on a planet called Appallon Five – but so does danger and betrayal.

=== Series 3: The Spoils of War (2017) ===
A third series, titled "The Spoils of War", consisting of four 60-minute episodes was released as a boxset in July 2017. They are set during season C of the TV series, with the first two episodes taking place after "Powerplay" and the third and fourth episodes set after "Rumours of Death". The role of Dayna, played by Josette Simon in the TV series, has been recast with Yasmin Bannerman.

No.	Title	Directed by	Written by	Released
Volume 3
1	"Liberation"	John Ainsworth & Nigel Fairs	Steve Lyons	July 2017
In the aftermath of the Galactic War, everything has changed for Blake’s former associates. Having lost their leader, they are forced to work with new allies - people they can’t trust. And that may just get all of them killed.
2	"Outpost"	John Ainsworth & Nigel Fairs	Christopher Cooper	July 2017
Tarrant and Vila are on a mission to the abandoned outpost Clivian 410B when a Federation taskforce attacks. The wary crewmates must learn to work together if they stand any chance of staying alive.
3	"Close Enough"	John Ainsworth & Nigel Fairs	Sophia McDougall	July 2017
When the crew of the Liberator are lured into a trap, it’s Avon’s life - and the freedom of the galaxy - that hang in the balance, while Cally regains something she thought she had lost forever.
4	"Solus"	John Ainsworth & Nigel Fairs	George Mann	July 2017
When the Liberator responds to a distress call from the Solus research station, Avon is hoping to find something valuable he can salvage. Instead, he finds only one survivor amongst the wreckage: President Servalan.

=== Series 4: Crossfire (2017 - 2018) ===
The fourth series, titled "Crossfire" - consisting of twelve 60-minute episodes - was released across 3 box sets from October 2017 to April 2018. They are set during season C of the TV series, between "Death-Watch" and "Terminal". A story arc running across the twelve episodes concerns the attempts of Servalan's predecessor to regain the presidency of the Federation.

No.	Title	Directed by	Written by	Released
Volume 4
1	"Paradise Lost"	John Ainsworth & Nigel Fairs	Steve Lyons	October 2017
Erewhon was a legendary vacation planet - until it was ravaged by acid storms. A new friend brings the Liberator crew here, their objective: to assassinate an old enemy. But what they find beneath Erewhon’s surface will plunge the galaxy into turmoil.
2	"True Believers"	John Ainsworth & Nigel Fairs	Simon Clark	October 2017
A mysterious voice forces Cally to a barren world where barbarians threaten a beleaguered city. There, Cally joins a dangerous quest to the Singing Grave, encountering evil of immense ferocity and power.
3	"Resurgence"	John Ainsworth & Nigel Fairs	Mark Wright	October 2017
A distress signal lures the Liberator to an uncharted world, where the ship’s systems come under attack from an outside influence. Avon and the crew face a spectre of the past that could destroy their hopes for the future.
4	"Fearless"	John Ainsworth & Nigel Fairs	David Bryher	October 2017
A criminal scheme threatens the balance of power in the Federation, and Vila's skills offer the best hope of containing the chaos. Bolstered by Cally's telepathy, he leaps into action - but when Servalan arrives on the scene, the situation quickly spirals out of control...
5	"Funeral on Kalion"	John Ainsworth	Trevor Baxendale	January 2018
Thern Sorron, the ruler of Kalion, is dead. Federation presidents, both old and new, attend the funeral ostensibly to pay their respects, but whoever possesses the Seal of Kalion, controls the vast Kalion shipyards.
6	"Shock Troops"	John Ainsworth	Cavan Scott	January 2018
As the war between the presidents escalates, new recruits are urgently required. Dayna gains first-hand experience of what life can be like as a Federation trooper as she confronts insurgent forces on a frontier world.
7	"Erebus"	John Ainsworth	Paul Darrow	January 2018
The Liberator is lured to the planet Erebus. There, the former Federation president is colluding with an old acquaintance of Avon’s who is eager for a reunion.
8	"The Scapegoat"	John Ainsworth	Steve Lyons	January 2018
On the Federation world of Astra Valadina, the former President is hatching a plan to discredit his successor and turn the tide of the war in his favour. The unwitting pawns in his scheme are the crew of the Liberator.
9	"Ministry of Truth"	John Ainsworth	Una McCormack	April 2018
In a special facility, the Federation propagandists are hard at work. When first Zeera Vos, and then the Liberator crew arrive, their work is disrupted, and a traitor, it seems, has been busy in their midst.
10	"Refuge"	John Ainsworth	Trevor Baxendale	April 2018
The Federation is in turmoil. The war is raging out of control. It’s time for Avon and his crew to pick a side - but when the Liberator finds a ship full of refugees, they realise that nothing can ever be that simple…
11	"Kith and Kin"	John Ainsworth	Christopher Cooper	April 2018
The planet Corrolos is a safe haven for ex-oligarchs and retired royalty. So why is Tarrant insistent on going there, and what was the last wish of his dead brother, Deeta?
12	"Death of Empire"	John Ainsworth	Steve Lyons	April 2018
Servalan is Supreme Empress of the Galaxy - but the man whose throne she usurped wants it back. The final battle of the Civil War begins - and it's time for the Liberator crew to take a stand.

=== Special: The Way Ahead (2018) ===
A 40th anniversary special, titled "The Way Ahead", consisting of two linked 60 minute episodes was released in January 2018. The first episode takes place during season A of the TV series, some time between "Project Avalon" and "Deliverance". The second episode takes place during season C of the TV series, some time around "Rumours of Death". A framing device, using continuity established by Paul Darrow's trilogy of "Lucifer" novels, is set some time after season D of the TV series. The role of Avalon, played by Julia Vidler in the TV series, has been recast with Olivia Poulet.

No.	Title	Directed by	Written by	Released
1–2	"Project Aquitar/Dissent"	John Ainsworth	Mark Wright	January 2018
Roj Blake. Kerr Avon. Names that sent shockwaves through the galaxy, shattering the foundations of the Terran Federation and giving hope to the oppressed. But what is their legacy? Crusading heroes or dangerous enemies of the state? In the early days of Blake’s rebellion, the Liberator comes to Malanar Delta to aid resistance leader Avalon, but the crew find Space Commander Travis and his Federation forces waiting. An abandoned Federation research project could give Travis the key to finally bringing Blake to justice. Years later, in the aftermath of the Galactic War, Avon and the Liberator crew fight to survive as new battle lines are drawn and alliances forged by President Servalan. Will survival be enough when a symbol of hope is turned into a devastating engine of war?

=== Series 5: Restoration (2019 - 2020) ===
A fifth series, titled "Restoration" - consisting of twelve 60-minute episodes - was released across three box sets beginning in January 2019 and ending in February 2020. The overarching storyline saw the crew desperately repairing the Liberator after it was badly damaged, and the return of the Old President's rule over the Federation.

No.	Title	Directed by	Written by	Released
Volume 5
1	"Damage Control"	John Ainsworth	Trevor Baxendale	January 2019
Damaged beyond repair, the Liberator is hurtling out of control. With Zen down, Avon injured and Tarrant losing his mind, what can the crew hope to achieve in the time they have left?
2	"The Hunted"	John Ainsworth	Iain McLaughlin	January 2019
In a stolen ship, Avon and Vila try to hold off a fleet led by the President of the Federation, buying time for Dayna, Tarrant and Cally to scavenge parts to save the Liberator.
3	"Figurehead"	John Ainsworth	Scott Harrison	January 2019
With the Liberator crippled and vulnerable, Tarrant and Cally are given just twenty-four hours to end the violence on Gamma Vynos II or kill the person responsible: Avalon.
4	"Abandon Ship"	John Ainsworth	Steve Lyons	January 2019
The Liberator is falling apart. Its life support systems are failing. The ship can no longer sustain five crewmembers. But who will stay and who will leave? Both options seem equally deadly...
5	"The New Age"	John Ainsworth	Mark Wright	November 2019
The dying Liberator arrives in orbit of Eloran, a world Avon believes could offer respite from their current trials. All that stands in the way is a primitive society, a charismatic leader and the fracture lines threatening to destroy the crew from within.
6	"Happy Ever After"	John Ainsworth	Steve Lyons	November 2019
The people of Zareen have seen the future. Their queen will be married to a handsome stranger, and they will enjoy a blissful life together. So, how can Tarrant possibly refuse...?
7	"Siren"	John Ainsworth	Sophia McDougall	November 2019
In the wreckage of a ruined world, Dayna and Cally encounter Mida and Veskar, who must escape the attention of those who once ruled them. Although defeated, the System still seeks to take control.
8	"Hyperion"	John Ainsworth	Trevor Baxendale	November 2019
Avon must convince the mysterious Selene to reveal the secret of Hyperion and save the Liberator – but the Federation is closing in on the crew, and what Selene knows could change everything...
9	"Parasite"	John Ainsworth	Trevor Baxendale	February 2020
Avon is missing, and Zen has taken control of the Liberator – but can the rest of the crew trust Selene's offer to help, and what is the secret of the doomed planet Tronis?
10	"Failsafe"	John Ainsworth	Steve Lyons	February 2020
General Enton Mordekain is trapped underground, badly injured, with no memory of how he came to be here - and he’s manacled to his worst enemy, Del Tarrant. He has to work out who he can trust - and fast.
11	"Reunion"	John Ainsworth	David Bryher	February 2020
A secret lies buried on the prison planet Cygnus Alpha. The Quonar parasite wants it - and so does Zeera Vos. With the Liberator crew caught in the crossfire, Vila and Zeera must face the past if they have any hope of getting out alive...
12	"Imperium"	John Ainsworth	Trevor Baxendale	February 2020
Fighting to save Zen - and prevent the President regaining total control - the crew of the Liberator must rescue Alta-One, the last survivor of the System, and discover the ultimate fate of Avon.

== The Worlds of Blake's 7 ==
A series of full cast boxsets taking place away from The Liberator consisting of three stories each.

#	Title	Cast	Writer	Release date
1	Avalon Volume 01: Terra Firma; Throwback; Black Water	Olivia Poulet (Avalon); Sally Knyvette (Jenna Stannis); Stephen Greif (Travis); Nicholas Asbury (Krask); Cliff Chapman (Madison); Stewart Clarke (Kiril); Jon Edgley Bond (Jon Weston); William Ellis (Gryson); Malcolm James (Dev Tarrant); Dawn Murphy (Dag); Richard Reed (Challis); Becky Wright (Fay)	Steve Lyons; Gary Russell; Trevor Baxendale	May 2021
2	Avalon Volume 02: Bayban's Bounty; Mercenary; Heart of Ice	Olivia Poulet (Avalon); Colin Baker (Bayban the Butcher); Hugh Fraser (The President); Stephen Greif (Travis); Luke Barton (Charron); Rachel Atkins (Corelano); Cliff Chapman (Madison); Nicholas Day (Jorah); Rosie Day (Alixa/Senna); Malcolm James (Dev Tarrant); Caroline Lawrie (Bonanne/Mutoid); John Rayment (Control/Pilot); David Sargent (Commander/Garson); Graham Seed (Noral); Charlotte Strevens (Winter)	Niel Bushnell; Christopher Cooper; Steve Lyons	June 2021
3	The Clone Masters: Separation; The Rule of Life; The Conclave	Jan Chappell (Cally / Lara K); Sally Knyvette (Jenna Stannis); Stephen Greif (Travis); Brian Croucher (Travis); Richenda Carey (Shar); Jade Gordon (Mutoid); Alistair Lock (Zen / Orac); Lucy Sheen (Vast); Abigail Thaw (Hinton); Tilly Vosburgh (Dr Sim); Becky Wright (Kiz)	Tim Foley	September 2021
4	Bayban the Butcher: Conscience; The Butcher's Wife; Vengeance Games	Colin Baker (Bayban); Sally Knyvette (Jenna Stannis); Stephen Greif (Travis); Michael Keating (Vila Restal); Abigail Thaw (Hinton); Karen Archer (Chancellor Shenrir); Fiona Hampton (Princess Arla); Abi Harris (Seff); Matthew Harris (Nemier / Tek); Tom Mahy (Ashan); Jessica Wilde (Innis)	Katharine Armitage; Lizzie Hopley; Lizbeth Miles	December 2021
5	The Terra Nostra: Stimulus/Response; Entrapment; The Offer	Sally Knyvette (Jenna Stannis); Michael Keating (Vila Restal); Karl Howman (Tudnam / The Enforcer); Pal Aron (Rax Aptford / TV Host); Ajjaz Awad (Grovenar / Dreamhead); Rakie Ayola (Councillor Zukonar / Jax); Ariyon Bakare (Kyzer Frik); Turlough Convery (Darra Teevan); Alistair Lock (Zen / Orac); Shvorne Marks (Legra Minassian); Rebecca Sarker (Mel Hessler / The Dream); Joe Shire (Jok Rork); Abigail Thaw (Hinton); Naomi Yang (Tudor / Karine); Jamie Zubairi (President Artim / Hessler / Ravel)	James Kettle; Robert Valentine; Peter Anghelides	January 2022
6	Heroes and Villains: The Amagon Queen; The Deal with Dorian; Everyone Talks to Shrinker	Sally Knyvette (Jenna Stannis); Jan Chappell (Cally); Laura Aikman (Mutoid / Pesh); Nicholas Asbury (Robard); Nigel Betts (Shrinker / Patrol Leader); Gabrielle Glaister (Skillane); Nicola Goodchild (Lana Tremayne); Matthew Gravelle (Dorian); Ahmed Hamad (Kelver / Young Shrinker); Alistair Lock (Zen / Orac); Tania Rodrigues (Mandala); Duncan Wisbey (Zander / Makavat); Shane Zaza (Spindler / Amagon King)	Trevor Baxendale; Mark B Oliver; Andrew Smith	May 2022
7	After the War: Andromeda One; Fallout; The Enemy	Jan Chappell (Cally); Brian Croucher (Travis); Sally Knyvette (Jenna Stannis); Jake Fairbrother (Jovak); Wayne Forester (Welcoming / Keefe); Alistair Lock (Zen); Simon Ludders (Karib); Adrian Lukis (Gorst); Niall MacGregor (Keel); Owen Oakeshott (Hallicus / Vonn); Gesella Ohaka (Ura Lekta); Kate O'Rourke (Trainee); Katherine Press (Galeen); Katy Secombe (Ritta / Captain); Ella Smith (Technical)	Trevor Baxendale; Steve Lyons; Katherine Armitage	November 2022
8	Allies and Enemies: Saurian Major; No Name; Sedition	Jan Chappell (Cally); Sally Knyvette (Jenna); Sasha Mitchell (Arlen); Stephen Greif (Travis); Brian Croucher (Travis); Victoria Alcock (Mac); Christopher Brand (Haban); Lauren Fitzpatrick (Faro); Jacqueline King (Kavoc); Samuel Lawrence (Tomal); Nigel Lindsay (Stor / Lux); Paul Panting (Cary / Velkrov)	Lizbeth Myles; Simon Guerrier; Jonathan Morris	December 2022
9	Tarrant: The Authorised Version; Behemoth; Bomb	Steven Pacey (Del Tarrant); Yasmin Bannerman (Dayna Mellanby); Margaret Ashley (Sergeant Anj Ralston); Ian Brooker (Per Ferow); Esmonde Cole (Mutoid / Junior Technician Stu Parro); Caleb Frederick (Corporal Stiv Leverett); Raj Ghatak (Man); Joe Jameson (Cal Ravella); Rosalyn Landor (Woman); Alistair Lock (Orac); Tania Rodrigues (Lon-Vessi); John Sackville (Comms Officer Naviid)	James Goss; Andy Lane; Gary Russell	June 2024

== Books ==
New standalone Blake's 7 novels set at various points in the show's history. Some are accompanied by audiobook versions. #9, #10 and #11 are audiobook only.

#	Title	Narrator	Writer	Release date
1	The Forgotten	N/A	Mark Wright and Cavan Scott	May 2012
2	Archangel	N/A	Scott Harrison	November 2012
3	Warship	N/A	Peter Anghelides	February 2013
4	Anthology	N/A	Gillian F. Taylor; R. A. Henderson; M. G. Harris	October 2013
5	Criminal Intent	N/A	Trevor Baxendale	November 2014
6	Mediasphere	N/A	Kate Orman and Jonathan Blum	August 2015
7	Heroes	Michael Keating	Trevor Baxendale; Paul Darrow; Jonathan L. Howard; Una McCormack; Lizbeth Myles; Gary Russell	November 2017
8	Uprising	Stephen Greif	Christopher Cooper	January 2019
9	Outlaw	Stephen Greif	Trevor Baxendale	November 2019
10	Chosen	Olivia Poulet	Niel Bushnell	November 2020
11	The Palluma Project	Sally Knyvette	Tim Gambrell	July 2021
12	The Clone Masters: The Rule Of Death	Glynis Barber	Trevor Baxendale	September 2021
13	Bayban the Butcher: Bayban Ascending	Colin Baker	Nigel Fairs	February 2022
14	The Terra Nostra: Zero Point	Stephen Greif	Scott Harrison and Mark B Oliver	September 2022
15	Avon: A Terrible Aspect	Alistair Lock	Paul Darrow	February 2025
16	Afterlife	Alistair Lock	Tony Attwood	October 2025

== Lucifer Trilogy ==
These form a trilogy of audiobook releases written and read by Paul Darrow taking place 20 years after season D of the TV series.

#	Title	Narrator	Writer	Release date
1	Lucifer	Paul Darrow	Paul Darrow	June 2013
2	Lucifer: Revelation	Paul Darrow	Paul Darrow	March 2015
3	Lucifer: Genesis	Stephen Greif	Paul Darrow	March 2021

== Awards and nominations ==
Name of the award ceremony, year presented, category, nominee(s) of the award, and the result of the nomination
Award ceremony	Year	Category	Work(s)	Result	Ref.
Scribe Awards	2014	Best Audio	The Armageddon Storm	Won	
Scribe Awards	2015	Best Audio	Fortuitas	Nominated	
Scribe Awards	2019	Best Audio	The Way Ahead	Nominated	

== See also ==
- Kaldor City
