= Joseph Lidster =

English playwright and screenwriter

Joseph Lidster is an English playwright and screenwriter, best known for his work on the Doctor Who spin-off series Torchwood and The Sarah Jane Adventures.

== Biography ==
He started his career writing Doctor Who audio plays for Big Finish Productions in 2002.

Numerous further audio plays and prose short stories followed for Big Finish, for their Doctor Who line, spin-offs and other series (Sapphire & Steel and The Tomorrow People).

In 2005, he started working for the BBC, writing tie-in material for the new Doctor Who television series. He made his television writing debut in 2008 on the second series of Doctor Who spin-off Torchwood and subsequently wrote three two-part stories for The Sarah Jane Adventures and two two-part stories for Wizards vs Aliens. Lidster wrote for the 2014 CBBC sitcom Millie Inbetween.

Lidster writes the content for the tie-in websites relating to the fictional world of the television series, Sherlock. The websites were designed as "a way of expanding the story". In 2017 he was the writer of #SherlockLive, an online game which played out on Twitter. The event won the People's Voice Award at the 2017 Webby Awards.

Alongside co-producer James Goss, he has produced Big Finish Productions' dramatic reading range of Dark Shadows audio dramas since 2011. In 2011, he script-edited the short film Cleaning Up written by Simon Guerrier and starring Mark Gatiss and Louise Jameson.

In 2012, he won the 'Audience Award for Favourite Playwright' for his first play Nice Sally in The Off Cut Festival. His short film, Wasted, reached the finals of the Balham Film Festival and was selected to be screened as part of the London Short Film Festival.

In July 2022, it was announced that he would be returning to the world of The Sarah Jane Adventures as a contributor to a series of audio dramas focussing on the character of Rani Chandra.

He wrote two episodes of Gifted for Black Camel Pictures and Media Valley in 2025.

== Credits ==
=== Television ===
- Torchwood
  - "A Day in the Death" (2008)
- The Sarah Jane Adventures
  - The Mark of the Berserker (2 parts, 2008)
  - The Mad Woman in the Attic (2 parts, 2009)
  - The Nightmare Man (2 parts, 2010)
- Wizards vs Aliens
  - Rebel Magic (2 parts, 2012)
  - The Cave of Menla-Gto (2 parts, 2013)
- Millie Inbetween
  - "Mobile Wars" (2014)
  - "Access All Areas" (2014)
  - "Mum v Mum" (2016)
- Eve
  - "The Eve of Destruction" (2016)
- Prisoner Zero
  - "Schism" (2016)
  - "Traitor" (2016)
- Hetty Feather
  - "Dreams'" (2016)
  - "The Last Sunday" (2017)
  - "Prisons" (2018)
  - "The Parchment" (2019)
- The Demon Headmaster
  - "Be Your True Self" (2019)
- The Dumping Ground
  - "Friend Zone" (2022)
- Gifted
  - "Secrets and Lies" (2025)
  - "Unfinished Business" (2025)

=== Film ===
- Walking with Dinosaurs

=== Radio ===
- The Afternoon Play
  - "Torchwood: Lost Souls" (2008)

=== Audio dramas ===
- Doctor Who
  - The Rapture (2002)
  - Master (2003)
  - Terror Firma (2005)
  - The Reaping (2006)
  - The Gathering (2006)
  - 100 (2007)
  - Short Trips: A Full Life (2016)
- Sapphire & Steel
  - Daisy Chain (2005)
  - The Mystery of the Missing Hour (2007)
- UNIT
  - The Longest Night (2005)
- Bernice Summerfield
  - The Crystal of Cantus (2006)
  - The Final Amendment (2007)
- The Tomorrow People
  - Aftermath (2006)
- Dark Shadows
  - London's Burning (2010)
  - The Crimson Pearl (2011 – with James Goss)
  - The Fall of the House of Trask (2012)
  - Snowflake (2014)
  - Bloodlust (2015)
- The Confessions of Dorian Gray
  - The Fallen King of Britain (2012)
- Torchwood
  - One Rule (2015)
  - Broken (2016)

=== Theatre ===
- Nice Sally (short play at the Off Cut Festival, Riverside Studios, 2012)
- Ghosts (short play at the Fright Night Festival, 2013)
- Congregation (short play produced as part of The Collective Project 2013 for The Pensive Federation)
- Withheld (short play produced as part of Shorts New Writing, Landor Theatre)

=== Short stories ===
- Doctor Who
  - "I Was A Monster!!!" in Short Trips: Zodiac (2002)
  - "That Time I Nearly Destroyed The World Whilst Looking For a Dress" in Short Trips: Past Tense (2004)
  - "The Tramp's Story" in Short Trips: Repercussions (2004)
  - "Trapped!" in Short Trips: Monsters (2004)
  - "The Terror of the Darkness" in Short Trips: A Day in the Life (2005)
  - "She Won't Be Home" in Short Trips: The History of Christmas (2005)
  - "Curtain Call" in Short Trips: Farewells (2006)
  - "Prologue" and "Forgotten" in Short Trips: The Centenarian (2006)
  - "Natalie's Diary" in Short Trips: Dalek Empire (2006)
  - "Salva Mea" in Short Trips: Snapshots (2007)
  - "Keeping It Real" in Short Trips: The Ghosts of Christmas (2007)
  - "42: Prologue" for the BBC's Doctor Who website (2007)
  - "Houdini and The Space Cuckoos" for the BBC's Doctor Who website (2012)
- Bernice Summerfield
  - "A Summer Affair" in A Life Worth Living (2005)
  - "Dead Mice" in Something Changed (2006)
- Torchwood
  - "Monster" in the Torchwood Yearbook (2008)
  - "Consequences" (2009)
- Other
  - "Success" in Voices from the Past (2011)
  - "Soul Man" in "Shenanigans" (2013)

=== Novellas ===
- Bernice Summerfield
  - "On Trial" in A Life in Pieces (2004)

=== Audiobooks ===
- Torchwood
  - In the Shadows (2009)
  - Red Skies (2012)

=== Other ===
From 2005 onwards, he wrote the fictional content for the Doctor Who tie-in websites including the MySpace blog for Martha Jones. In 2007, he edited the Doctor Who short story collection Short Trips: Snapshots. The following year, he wrote "Mad Martha" for the Doctor Who website. In 2007 and 2008 he abridged a number of Doctor Who and Torchwood novels for BBC Audiobooks, including Sting of the Zygons, Wooden Heart, Another Life, Border Princes and Slow Decay. He also wrote the fictional blogs of Sherlock Holmes, John Watson, Molly Hooper and Connie Prince, as part of the BBC Sherlock series. He later co-wrote an interactive graphic novel, Tell Me Your Secrets', for BBC Teach.
