= Neil Cole =

British actor (born 1972)

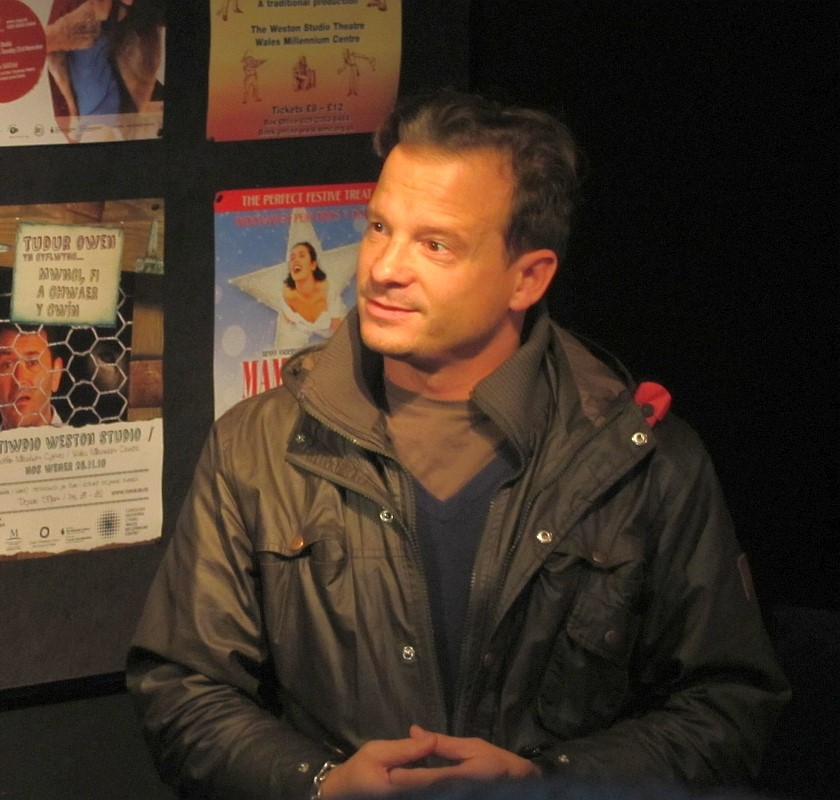
- Born: 1 March 1972 (age 54); Bristol, England

Neil Cole (born 1 March 1972) is an English television presenter, comedian, radio broadcaster and actor.

== Early life ==
Cole was born in Bristol in 1972, lived in Allendale, New Jersey, USA as a child, and attended King Edward Grammar School in Chelmsford. He studied English and French Literature at Bristol University.

== Stand-up comedy ==
As a comedian, Cole - with Tom Hillenbrand - was half of successful but short-lived stand-up double act, Hitchcock's Half Hour, which won the coveted Hackney Empire New Act of the Year competition in 1998. They supported Harry Hill and Ennio Marchetto in West End Theatres, and appeared on BBC1's The Stand Up Show, BBC Radio 4's Loose Ends and contributed to Channel 4's The Eleven O'Clock Show before splitting up in 2000.

Cole returned to the stand-up circuit as a solo comic in February 2007, MCing live music events at the Royal Albert Hall. In March 2010, Cole's debut hour-long solo stand-up show Neil By Mouth premiered at the Glasgow International Comedy Festival, and ran throughout the Edinburgh Festival Fringe in August 2011, at Cabaret Voltaire. He was one of the first UK comedians to perform at the improvised stand-up phenomenon Set-List in Edinburgh and subsequently in London.

Cole was a founder member of London sketch team The Pros From Dover alongside Phil Whelans and Richard Glover, and occasionally still guests with them.

In 2017 and 2018 Cole was a core cast member of Slattery Night Fever, a regular improvised comedy show on London's off-West End, directed by Lesley Ann Albiston and credited with the comeback of Tony Slattery.

== Television ==
Cole was the series writer for Ultimate Rush, an adventure sports documentary series produced by Red Bull Media House for its final two seasons. He was also the live reporter and host for FIA World Rallycross Championship from 2014-2022. Other work includes hosting a show about roller-coasters for National Geographic Channel called Man Vs Ride and hosting Red Bull Race Day 2019. He produced and reported for Formula E, World Series by Renault and World Touring Car Championship. Before that, Cole presented the World Rally Championship on Dave during 2008–2010. He has previously worked for BBC, ITV, Channel 4, MTV, AXN, UKTV, Extreme Sports Channel, The Audi Channel, Eurosport and Sky One. In 2026 he was a presenter and pit-reporter at the 24 Hours of Le Mans for the sixth time. In 2024 & 2025 he was the host of the Fédération Internationale de l'Automobile Awards Ceremony.

He has reported on location from major international events, including the London 2012 Olympic Games, the 2006 FIFA World Cup, the Race of Champions, the MTV Europe Music Awards, UK National Table Tennis Championships, the World Rally Championship and World Cup Skateboarding.

Cole has also hosted (and often associate-produced) further shows including:

- (for MTV) Select MTV, Euro Top 20, mtv:new, World Chart Express, MTV News and his own weekly live music and chat show, The Fridge.
- (for AXN) AXN Road Trip, Shakedown (also shown on ITV4 and Men & Motors, twice nominated for a Royal Television Society Award 2006 & 2007).
- Bedrock - a live daily magazine show that launched ITV's digital platform ITV2 in 1998, co-hosting with Malcolm Jeffries, Ben Shephard, Heather Suttie and Rachel Brady. The Series Producer of the show was Drew Pearce

== Acting ==
2024 saw Cole appear as photographer Brian Green in BBC One series Call The Midwife and as Jarrod Williams in science fiction feature film Sentinel. In 2025 he was cast in the Amazon MGM Studios feature film My Fault: London as the racing instructor at Brands Hatch; the movie was #1 and spent 11 weeks in Prime Video's top 10.

Cole won the Best Actor award at the Unrestricted View Horror Film Festival 2016 for his role as Pete in British comedy horror feature film Stag Hunt, starring alongside Mackenzie Astin.

Other work includes character roles in the Dark Ditties series on Amazon Prime. He also played a Radio DJ in feature film Borrowed Time and Captain William in feature film Richard the Lionheart: Rebellion

In theatre, Cole recently played Meatball in the World Premiere of Lesley Ann Albiston's new play A Slice of Eel Pie. He has appeared in leading roles including: Puck in A Midsummer Night's Dream, Hal in Loot, Nero in Britannicus, Wilson in The Ruffian on the Stair, Willie in Blue Remembered Hills, Mephistopheles in Dr Faustus, and various characters in Mamet's Edmond. He has played The Darkness in cult comedy Umbrage Swain and the Magical Diamond of Ramtutiti in London's Off-West End.

== Radio ==
Since 2024 Cole has appeared eight times on BBC Radio London as an expert correspondent. After several years hosting various shows on London 104.9 Xfm (including breaking new Scandinavian bands like Peter, Bjorn & John and The Concretes in his feature Northern Xposure), Cole was the daytime DJ for NME Radio from launch until summer 2009. He has also guest-starred in two Sapphire & Steel audio plays, All Fall Down and Dead Man Walking.
