= List of Sapphire & Steel serials =

This is a list of the television and audio serials of the British science fantasy series Sapphire & Steel. The 34-episode television series was transmitted between July 1979 and August 1982 on ITV1 and was produced by Shaun O'Riordan, with David Reid as executive producer.

== Television serials ==
=== Series One ===
Serial no.	No. of episodes	Original air dates (UK)	Writer	Director
1	6	10 to 26 July 1979	P.J. Hammond	Shaun O'Riordan
In an old house filled with old antiques, a nursery rhyme ("Ring a Ring o' Roses") read aloud causes a time fracture that takes away the parents of youngsters Rob and Helen. As Rob (Steven O'Shea), Helen's older brother, tries to call the police, two mysterious strangers calling themselves Sapphire and Steel arrive to fix the problem. Lead also arrives to provide assistance to Steel when the ghosts of the time corridor incapacitate him. P.J. Hammond novelised this story for Star Books in 1979. It was simultaneously available in both hardback and paperback
Val Pringle as Lead, Steven O'Shea as Rob Jardine, Tamasin Bridge as Helen Jardine, Felicity Harrison as Mother, John Golightly as Father, Ronald Goodale as Countryman, Charles Pemberton as Policeman
2	8	31 July to 22 November 1979	P.J. Hammond	Shaun O'Riordan & David Foster
In an abandoned railway station, parapsychologist George Tully conducts an investigation, as two operators, Sapphire and Steel arrive for an investigation of their own. A malevolent, growing force identifying itself as the Darkness is feeding on the resentment of the dead, using as a focus Private Sam Pearce, the apparition of a World War I soldier shot and killed eleven minutes after the armistice had been signed at the eleventh hour of the eleventh day of the eleventh month in 1918. The Darkness 'recruits' other resentful shades from the past who also died unfairly as a result of coming or completed wars. Sapphire and Steel must decide if the life of one living human is worth the price of the danger presented by the growing Darkness. This episode's transmission was interrupted by the 1979 ITV technicians strike, which lasted from 10 August to 24 October 1979. Afterwards, instead of resuming transmission with the next episode, the episode was transmitted from the beginning, starting on 30 October 1979.
Gerald James as George Tully, Tom Kelly as Private Sam Pearce (The Soldier), David Cann as Pilot, David Woodcock as Submariner

=== Series Two ===
Serial no.	No. of episodes	Original air dates (UK)	Writer	Director
3	6	6 to 22 January 1981	P.J. Hammond	Shaun O'Riordan
Rothwyn and Eldred, a couple living in a modern apartment with a baby, are from the 35th Century, the apartment is their time capsule, which is situated and cloaked on the roof of a present-day tower block; in a test to live as 20th century humans. But trouble starts when the couple discover that they can neither contact their controllers in the future nor two other similar time capsules in the present day. The bio-mechanical system that runs the capsule has an agenda of its own, one of vengeance. This time, Sapphire and Steel have help in the form of Silver, an inter-dimensional operator.
David Collings as Silver, David Gant as Eldred, Catherine Hall as Rothwyn, Russell Wooton as Changeling
4	4	27 January to 5 February 1981	P.J. Hammond	David Foster
Phantom children with sepia-toned skin play in the back yard of an aging apartment building and its adjoining antiques shop which is currently closed. Both the landlord, Mr. Williamson, and a tenant named Ruth have mysteriously disappeared. A man without a face in cahoots with the children, appears on the stairs. An evil presence has emerged from a photograph; something which has appeared in every photograph ever taken anywhere in the world, and is powerful enough to turn Sapphire and Steel into literal two-dimensional photographs of themselves.
Alyson Spiro as Liz, Philip Bird and Bob Hornery as the Shape, Shelagh Stephenson as Ruth, Natalie Hedges as Parasol girl

=== Series Three ===
Serial no.	No. of episodes	Original air dates (UK)	Writer	Director
5	6	11 to 26 August 1981	Don Houghton and Anthony Read	Shaun O'Riordan
Lord Mullrine, a wealthy industrialist, hosts a party at his mansion where he and the guests pretend it is the 1930s again. The occasion is to celebrate fifty years since his company was founded with the late Dr. George McDee a virologist. Mullrine has even gone so far as to have every room in the house, with the exception of his private office, put back to its 1930s style. Sapphire and Steel arrive under an alias, then, time itself starts to interfere. Dr. McDee turns up at the party along with other anachronisms, and then, one by one, the guests are murdered. Secrets and lies involving McDee and a marital affair from fifty years before are resurfacing.
Patience Collier as Emma Mullrine, Davy Kaye as Lord Mullrine, Nan Munro as Felicity McDee, Jeffry Wickham as Felix Harborough, Jeremy Child as Howard McDee, Jennie Stoller as Annabelle Harborough, Peter Laird as Greville, Stephen MacDonald as George McDee, Christopher Bramwell as Tony Purnell, Patricia Shakesby as Anne Shaw, Debbie Farrington as Veronica Blamey, Valentine Dyall as Radio broadcast voice

=== Series Four ===
Serial no.	No. of episodes	Original air dates (UK)	Writer	Director
6	4	19 to 31 August 1982	P.J. Hammond	David Foster
At an abandoned service station and its adjoining café, time has stopped. Operator Silver has arrived first assessing the situation. Sapphire and Steel remain uncertain as to exactly what they are supposed to be investigating. The key may lie in two humans in the café who claim to be from 1948, a service station worker, and a travelling performer, but something envious and sinister gets closer before a trap is sprung. Many regional editions of TVTimes wrongly billed this story as a repeat. This was possibly due to confusion caused by the changeover from ATV to Central on 1 January 1982, when an ITV contracts change in 1980 resulted in the Midlands ITV region's franchise going from the first company to the second.
David Collings as Silver, Edward de Souza as the Man, Johanna Kirby as the Woman, John Boswall as Old man, Christopher Fairbank as Johnny Jack

== Audio serials ==
- Regular cast: Susannah Harker as Sapphire, David Warner as Steel
- Producers: Nigel Fairs, Jason Haigh-Ellery

=== Series One ===
CD #	Release date	Story Title	Writer
1	May 2005	The Passenger	Steve Lyons
A steam train enthusiast boards an antiquated 1930s train for a journey with eleven other passengers, and an old book provides the trigger for Time to start playing out a familiar tale that will end in murder. Can Sapphire, Steel and Gold overcome one man's guilt and prevent the inevitable?
Cast: Mark Gatiss as Gold, Hugo Myatt as Philip Burgess, Jackie Skarvellis as Mrs Warburton, Neil Henry as John Andrews, Clare Louise Connolly as The Princess
2	June 2005	Daisy Chain	Joseph Lidster
An ordinary house with a seemingly happy family hides a secret that might destroy them, as well as Sapphire and Steel. The operatives must find the right link in a chain of cause and effect – but to break it, someone may have to be sacrificed.
Cast: Kim Hartman as Gabrielle, Lena Rae as Jennifer, Stuart Piper as James, Saul Jaffe as Voice, Emma Kilbey as Voice, Joseph Lidster as Tom
3	July 2005	All Fall Down	David Bishop
In an historical area of London, old artefacts are uncovered, and a journal provides a dangerous link to the past. Even with Silver's help, Steel finds the Black Plague reaching out from the mists of Time, while Sapphire risks becoming trapped as part of history itself.
Cast: David Collings as Silver, Michael Chance as Webber, Kate Dyson as Fleming, Suzanne Proctor as Mary, Linda Bartram as The Girl, Neil Cole as Police Officer
4	August 2005	The Lighthouse	Nigel Fairs
A newlywed couple move into a lighthouse intending to renovate it, but ghosts from the past, secrets from the present and phantoms from the future hurtle around one another in a time storm, threatening to engulf them all in an inescapable cycle of madness and death.
Cast: Neil Salvage as Old Man, Joseph Young as Adrian, Ian Hallard as Nicholas, Lucy Beresford as Suzy, Michael Adams as Mike, Stuart Piper as Young Boy
5	September 2005	Dead Man Walking	Nigel Fairs (based on a story by John Ainsworth)
An unexplained death at a prison is only the first of a series of inconsistencies with Time that Sapphire and Steel are called in to investigate.
Cast: David Collings as Silver, Arthur Bostrom as Richard Hanmore, Jo Castleton as Marian Anderson, Neil Cole as Ian Jackson, Michael Chance as Hammond, Nigel Fairs as Kilsby, Suzanne Proctor as Marcus, Linda Bartram as Mo

=== Series Two ===
CD #	Release date	Story Title	Writer
2.1	July 2006	The School	Simon Guerrier
The school has stood for a century, and proud of its history. However, old ghosts are stirring and lessons will be learned... but will Sapphire and Steel become the teachers, or the students?
Cast: Keith Drinkel as Mr Leslie, Lisa Daniely as Mrs Leslie, Victoria Gould as Chatura, James Daniel Wilson as Max
2.2	September 2006	The Surest Poison	Richard Dinnick
An auction of timepieces, a 156-year-old man, the theft of the greatest watch ever built and its creator, the greatest watchmaker of all: all linked across history. Time has a plan, one with cataclysmic consequences for humanity unless Sapphire and Steel can stop it.
Cast: Richard Franklin as Webb, Tom Bevan as Breguet, Eric MacLennan as Gerard, Helen Goldwyn as Cecile
2.3	November 2006	Water Like a Stone	Nigel Fairs
In an abandoned theatre on Christmas Eve, plans to celebrate a dead playwright's work threaten to lure Sapphire and Steel into a maze from which there may be no escape...
Cast: Lisa Bowerman as Ruby, Nicholas Briggs as Arthur, Lucy Gaskell as The Girl, Suzanne Proctor as Dolly
2.4	January 2007	Cruel Immortality	Nigel Fairs
Steel is alone, trapped in a Retirement Home in the middle of nowhere.
Cast: Muriel Pavlow as Mrs P, Daphne Oxenford as Enid, Ian Burford as Stanley, Lois Baxter as Matron, Lucy Gaskell as Carer, Steve Kynman as Carer, Lisa Bowerman as Carer, Nigel Fairs as Carer
2.5	March 2007	Perfect Day	Steve Lyons
Steel, Sapphire and Gold find themselves attending a wedding.
Cast: Mark Gatiss as Gold, Victoria Carling as Lydia, Philip McGough as The Captain, Daniel Weyman as Richard, Matthew Steer as James, Caroline Morris as Jennifer
2.6	May 2007	The Mystery of the Missing Hour	Joseph Lidster
Sapphire and Steel arrive in Cairo, 1926 to solve an impossible murder.
Cast: Colin Baker as Narrator, Sarah Douglas as Lady Marjorie, Ian Hallard as Arthur, Cate Debenham Taylor as Jane, Ian Brooker as Cornelius, Nigel Fairs as MC

=== Series Three ===
CD #	Release date	Story Title	Writer
3.1	March 2008	Second Sight	Nigel Fairs
Sapphire and Steel have gone. Sapphire and Steel are here.
Cast: Blair McDonough as Steel, Anna Skellern as Sapphire, Lisa Bowerman as Ruby, Patience Tomlinson as Mary, Clare Calbraith as Polly, Duncan McInnes as Davey, Angela Bruce as Annie
3.2	April 2008	Remember Me	John Dorney
A faded sitcom star wanders through the darkness of a deserted pier, haunted by the ghosts of his dead colleagues.
Cast: Sam Kelly as Eric, Joannah Tincey as Kate, David Horovitch as The Nostalgia
3.3	May 2008	Zero	Steve Lyons
The Space Shuttle Aspirant is in a decaying orbit, its engines dead. Time is running out.
Cast: David Collings as Silver, Mark Gatiss as Gold, Angela Bruce as Andrea
3.4	August 2008	Wall of Darkness	Nigel Fairs
An abandoned shopping centre in the middle of the night. Is the journey at an end?
Cast: Louise Jameson as Sally, Ian Hallard as Justin, Robert Maloney as Russell, Timothy Watson as Jason, Joannah Tincey as Miranda
