= Angela Bruce =

English actress

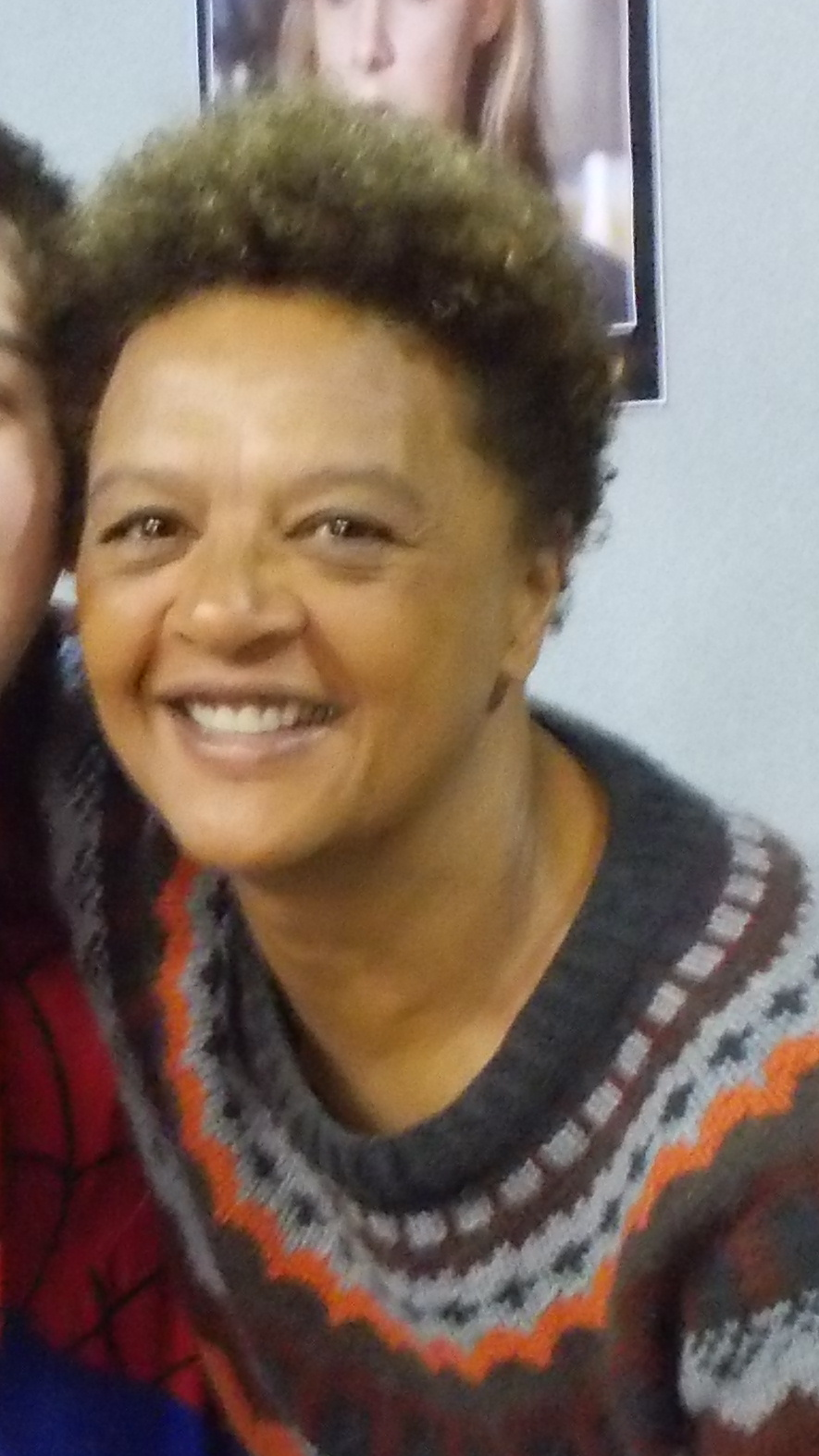
- Angela Bruce at Bournemouth Comic-Con in 2016
- Born: 6 May 1951 (age 75); Leeds, West Riding of Yorkshire, England
- Occupation: Actress
- Years active: 1973–present

Angela Bruce (born 6 May 1951) is an English actress, noted for her television work. Bruce was born in Leeds, West Riding of Yorkshire to a West Indian father and white mother. She was put up for adoption aged three, and brought up in Craghead, County Durham.

== Acting and film career ==
Bruce made her stage debut in 1970 in the musical Hair after she joined other members of the audience dancing on stage during a performance in Newcastle and was then signed up to appear in the show.

Bruce made her screen debut in the 1973 film Man at the Top, and on the London stage she was the second actress to play Magenta in the original production of The Rocky Horror Show, succeeding Patricia Quinn. Regular or recurring roles in television series include Sandra Ling in Angels (1975–83), Janice Stubbs in Coronation Street (1978) and reporter Chrissie Stuart in Press Gang (1989–90). In 1980, she appeared in "Charlie Boy", an episode of Hammer House of Horror.

Bruce is also recognisable to sci-fi fans for her performance as Brigadier Winifred Bambera in the 1989 Doctor Who serial Battlefield, her female Lister in Red Dwarf and her portrayal of Dayna Mellanby in the Blake's 7 audio drama The Syndeton Experiment.

Her other notable credits include Prime Suspect and Only Fools and Horses in which she played Councillor Murray. She also appeared as prison officer Mandy Goodhue in the popular ITV1 prison drama series Bad Girls; this was the second time she had appeared in a British women's prison drama series, having played tough inmate Bobbie in an episode of Within These Walls titled "The Good Life".

Bruce played Gina in the 2002 film Mrs Caldicot's Cabbage War and in 2008 she guest-starred in the Sapphire & Steel audio dramas Second Sight and Zero. She also guest-starred in Old Wounds, a 2015 episode of Vera in which she played Beryl Doyle, mother of a murder victim found buried, having gone missing 30 years earlier. In June 2020, she appeared in an episode of the BBC soap opera Doctors as Carmen Few.

== Filmography ==
Film
Year	Title	Role	Director
1973	Man at the Top	Joyce	Mike Vardy
1988	Managing Problem People. Behavioral Skills for Leaders		Charles Crichton
2002	Mrs Caldicot's Cabbage War	Gina	Ian Sharp
2023	Silver Haze	Alice	Sacha Polak

Television
Year	Title	Role	Notes
1974	ITV Playhouse	Nell	Episode: "Lucky"
1975	Within These Walls	Roberta	Episode: "The Good Life"
1975–79	Angels	Sandra Ling	Series 1–5, 34 episodes (main role)
1975	Play for Today	Night Nurse	Episode: "Through the Night"
1976	Red Letter Day	June	Episode: "Matchfit"
1976	Rock Follies	Gloria	Miniseries; 5 episodes
1978	Coronation Street	Janice Stubbs	12 episodes
1979	Empire Road	Camille	Episode: "Mongrels"
1980	Hammer House of Horror	Sarah	Episode: "Charlie Boy"
1983	The Winner	Mrs. Roper	TV movie
1985	Dempsey and Makepeace	Nursing Sister	Episode: "Tequila Sunrise"
1986	The Practice	Rita Lunt	1 episode
1987	Up Line	Camilla Du Bois	4 episodes
1988	King & Castle	Headmistress	Episode: "Class"
1988	Red Dwarf	Deb Lister	Episode: "Parallel Universe"
1988	South of the Border	Maura	Series 1, Episode 7
1989–90	Press Gang	Chrissie Stuart	Series 1–2, 10 episodes
1989	Doctor Who	Brigadier Winifred Bambera	Serial: "Battlefield"
1989	Starting Out	Asbestos Expert	Episode: "Mr. Christie"
1991	Spender	Melanie	Episode: "Dance Girl Dance"
1991	Doctor at the Top	Sheila	Episode: "Waring Goes Private"
1991	Prime Suspect	Helen Masters	Series 1
1991	Waiting for God	Judy	Episode: "Counselling for the Dying"
1992	Lovejoy	Dr. Pilger	Episode :"Eric of Arabia"
1992	Van der Valk	Tony Vishnu	Episode: "Still Waters"
1992	Sean's Show	Scriptwriter	Episode: "Blind Date"
1992	Watt on Earth	Eve Carter	1 episode
1993	The Upper Hand	Claudia	Episode: "Big Bad Burrows"
1993	Jackanory	Storyteller	Episode: "Pass-the-Story"
1994	Takin' Over the Asylum	Isabel	Miniseries
1996	The Bill	Jessica Joseph	Series 12, Episode 31
1996	Casualty	Joy	Series 11, Episode 11
1996	Our Friends In The North	Nursing Sister	Episode: "1987"
1996	Only Fools and Horses	Councillor Murray	Episode: "Heroes and Villains"
1996-1999	The Bill	Various	3 episodes
1996-2015	Casualty	Various	3 episodes
1997	The Bill	Ann Harris	Series 13, Episode 33
1997	Keeping Mum	Doctor	Episode: "The Accident"
1999	Big Bad World	Miss Sayer	2 episodes
2000–01	The Ghost Hunter	Mrs. Justin	Series 1–2, 8 episodes
2000	Hero to Zero	Mrs. Vaughn	2 episodes
2000	EastEnders	D.S. Langford	6 episodes
2001	Silent Witness	Alice Michaels	2 episodes
2001-2020	Holby City	Various	6 episodes
2002	My Family	Server	Episode: "Misery"
2002-2020	Doctors	Various	6 episodes
2003	Messiah	Dr. Dugdale	Series 2, Episodes 1 & 2
2004	Doctors and Nurses	Inspector	Episode: "Seeing Stars"
2005	Holby City	Bryony Miller	Series 7, Episode 12
2005	Doctors	Angela Devon	Series 7, Episode 23
2005	Waking the Dead	Judge	Episode: "Straw Dog: Part 1"
2005	Mary Seacole: The Real Angel of Crimea	Mary Seacole	TV movie
2006	Bad Girls	Mandy Goodhue	11 episodes
2007	Spooks	Ruth Chambers	Episode: "The Broadcast"
2009	Doctors	Mrs. Gilbert	Series 10, Episode 189
2015	Vera	Beryl Doyle	Episode: "Old Wounds"
2016	Doctors	Patricia Telford	Series 17, Episode 163
2016	Him	Fran	Miniseries, all 3 episodes
2017	Death in Paradise	Ernestine Gray	1 episode
2025	The Iris Affair	Meski	4 episodes

=== Audio Drama ===
Year	Title		Role	Notes
2008	Sapphire and Steel: Series 3		Annie / Andrea	Episode: "Second Sight" as Annie
2008	Sapphire and Steel: Series 3		Annie / Andrea	Episode: "Zero" as Andrea
2011	Doctor Who: The Lost Stories		Brigadier Winifred Bambera	Episode: "Animal"
2018	The War Master: The Master of Callous		Mother	Episode: "The Persistence of Dreams"
2019	Doctor Who: The Monthly Adventures		Herb	Episode: "Conversion"
2021	Doctor Who: The War Doctor Begins: Warbringer		Oya / Andarta, Incipient Mother	Episode: "Consequences"
2022	UNIT: Nemesis 2: Agents of the Vulpreen		Brigadier Winifred Bambera	Episode: "The War Factory"
2022	UNIT: Brave New World	Seabird One	Brigadier Winifred Bambera	
2022	UNIT: Brave New World	Visitants	Brigadier Winifred Bambera	
2025	UNIT: Brave New World	Fractures	Brigadier Winifred Bambera	
2026	UNIT: Brave New World	Knightfall	Brigadier Winifred Bambera	
