= Stuart Piper =

British teacher, educator and talent agent

Stuart Piper is a teacher, educator, talent agent, and former producer of feature films.

Since 2021 Stuart has been based in York, studying English Literature, English Language, CELTA and PGCE Teaching English at Secondary at University of York (PGCE/Masters) and York St John University (BA Hons, CELTA) while consulting and teaching for education institutions, in York, London and internationally online.

Stuart was a talent agent at InterTalent Rights Group (and formerly Theatre and Film Production General Manager at Cole Kitchenn) from 2005-2019, representing many stars from Pixie Lott, Amy Nuttall to Mel B & Dame Joan Collins. He also represented influencer Neil Henry], helping him to his first 1 million views on YouTube before reaching over 10 million subscribers across 5 platforms (notably TikTok, Facebook & Instagram). In 2022, with Neil, Stuart co-hosted and produced podcast special Transforming with first guest The Iceman Wim Hof available on Apple, Spotify, Audible and all major podcast platforms.

His Film executive producing credits include The Time of Their Lives starring Joan Collins, Pauline Collins, Franco Nero and Joely Richardson with Universal (now on Amazon Prime), and Mrs Lowry & Son starring Timothy Spall and Vanessa Redgrave (now on Netflix).

In West End theatre, he co-founded the "theatregoer's choice" annual event, the Whatsonstage.com Awards, which he produced from 2006 to 2019 with hosts including James Corden & Sheridan Smith, and was Producer of Nicholas Hoult in New Boy and Phill Jupitus in Lifecoach at the Trafalgar Studios and Associate Producer of Breakfast at Tiffany's at Theatre Royal, Haymarket in 2016,

In 2020, during lockdown he produced virtual Screen Acting masterclasses online to keep children busy nationwide, which special guest teachers Sheridan Smith and Nicholas Hoult among many others. Stuart now coaches young and new talent internationally in screen acting and career strategy for leading managements and artists, including youth talent, worldwide.

He was formerly an actor, best known for roles in The Politician's Wife, Plastic Man and Tom's Midnight Garden, in West End musicals Snoopy! The Musical, Bugsy Malone, Scrooge, and he recorded the role of Judas in Jesus Christ Superstar at Abbey Road Studios.

He has a son called Charlie Piper born January 2010 from his earlier marriage to Robyn North.

== Teacher, Educator, Youth Theatre Director ==
Stuart has directed for Youth Theatre Groups in London and York, and online internationally for over twenty years, having himself been a member of the National Youth Music Theatre and National Youth Theatre of Great Britain and training at the Arts Educational Schools, Tring Park where he received a Teaching Speech and Drama Education Diploma AVCM(TD)Hons from Victoria College of Music and Drama. He moved to York in 2021 to live closer to his son Charlie and while studying and training has since taught Drama at Frances Lyn Theatre School in Malton Matt Zina Acting, for Bijou Talent and directed Bugsy Malone, Encanto and Mamma Mia for Yorkshire Rose Academy of Dance.

Stuart receives a PGCE in Secondary Education (English Literature and Language) from University of York with QTS (Qualified Teacher Status) following a BA (Hons) in English Literature from York St John University, before going on to study for a Masters while Teaching English in schools in the UK and internationally.

Stuart's online Zoom courses in Screen Acting have received world class special guests from Sheridan Smith to Nicholas Hoult.

In 2024, Stuart also trains for a CELTA (Certificate in Teaching English to Speakers of Other Languages) teaching ESL (English as Second Language). While in York Stuart has also volunteered for the homelessness charity Carecent for 18 months (leading as interim Manager for 4 months) supporting the vulnerable and those in need, in conjunction with the Central Methodist Church, York.

== Agent ==
Stuart represented actors, comedians and creatives, as managing director of Cole Kitchenn agency which he co-founded in 2005, which was brought into the InterTalent Rights Group with Chairman Jonathan Shalit rebranded in 2018. He since consulted for influencers and companies on how to grow their brands and digital platforms.

His client list included established stars: Pixie Lott, Dame Joan Collins, Janie Dee, Chizzy Akudolu, Rita Simons, Jan Ravens, Josie Lawrence, Hamilton star Christine Allado; music artists he moved into Acting: Alexandra Burke, Katherine Jenkins OBE, Spice Girls Emma Bunton, Mel B, Hannah Spearritt, Mica Paris, Tulisa, theatre stars who he took to award success Evening Standard Award Winner Tyrone Huntley, multi Olivier Award winner David Bedella, Whatsonstage Award Winner Emma Williams, Olivier award nominee Amy Lennox, Stage Debut Award Winner Amara Okereke, double Olivier Award nominee Caroline O'Connor, Grammy Award nominee Alexandra Silber, Hamilton star Christine Allado, Mazz Murray, Wicked star Alice Fearn and creatives including Arlene Phillips. In 2010, the agency became part of ROAR Group led by Chairman Jonathan Shalit, expanding to become part of a group of entertainment companies. The Stage called him a "Star Maker" in a front page interview, and he was also featured in Broadcast Magazine & in Deadline. In Jan 2017 he oversaw acquisition of CKP (Christian Knowles Productions) the agency that represented Micky Flanagan, and was appointed Director of the company as reported in The Stage and on Chortle. He was also Acting Agent for all finalists and winners of Britain's Got Talent for 7 years and The X Factor for 3 years as part of Jonathan Shalit's management team on the shows for Syco, and was part of the management teams representing judges Tulisa and Mel B. Jonathan Shalit told The Stage: "I was excited by Stuart Piper, who is a dynamic young man, he’s a new agent really championing his talent, which I haven’t seen from a lot of theatrical agents"

The personal management company was originally a subsidiary of West-End theatre production company Cole Kitchenn Ltd, and in 2010 it became part of ROAR Group, a group of entertainment companies led by Chairman Jonathan Shalit as reported by The Stage Newspaper. The merger led to the agency being affiliated to other companies in the group such as Music Management & TV Talent company ROAR Global. His associate agent was Brooke Kinsella MBE. He wrote a column for The Stage Newspaper regularly and has an online blog 'Agent's Take'

Stuart retired from Agenting in 2019, to move into Producing and Education.

== Producer ==
Stuart has also produced West-End theatre, and his most notable stage production was Nicholas Hoult in New Boy which broke all box-office records at the Trafalgar Studios, and as reported in the Evening Standard, "The show has become the fastest selling and highest grossing at the Trafalgar Studios since they opened five years ago." He was Associate Producer on "Breakfast at Tiffany's" starring Pixie Lott which opened at Leicester Curve, UK Tour & Theatre Royal, Haymarket in 2016. & Producer of Hatched 'N' Dispatched at Park Theatre starring Diana Vickers.

In 2017 he was reported to be Executive Producer on his first feature film The Time of Their Lives (2017 film) starring Joan Collins, Pauline Collins, Franco Nero and Joely Richardson as announced in Screen Daily.

In 2019, he was Executive Producer on his second feature film Mrs Lowry & Son starring Timothy Spall and Vanessa Redgrave.

In 2020, during lockdown he produced virtual Screen Acting masterclasses online which special guest teachers Sheridan Smith and Nicholas Hoult among many others. Stuart now coaches youth talent internationally in screen acting and career strategy for leading managements and artists worldwide. Stuart also represented now super influencer Neil Henry, helping him to his first 1 million views on YouTube before reaching over 10 million subscribers across 5 platforms (notably TikTok, Facebook & Instagram) and in 2022 they produced an inspirational podcast special together Transforming with guest The Iceman Wim Hof available on Apple, Spotify, Audible and all major podcast platforms.

Other productions include Phill Jupitus in Lifecoach at the Trafalgar Studios which was nominated for Whatsonstage.com Award for Best New Comedy, Caroline O'Connor The Showgirl Within and Frances Ruffelle Beneath The Dress at the Garrick Theatre, Howard Goodall's Days of Hope at the King's Head Theatre and Snoopy! The Musical at the New Players Theatre. He also worked as a General Manager for two years for Cole Kitchenn Ltd working on such productions as the Laurence Olivier Award winning Death of a Salesman starring Brian Dennehy and Clare Higgins at the Lyric Theatre, the Tony Award and Pulitzer Prize winning I Am My Own Wife at the Duke of York's Theatre and Daddy Cool at the Shaftesbury.

He also established in 2006 the Whatsonstage.com Awards live concerts, which take place annually in a West-End theatre. They have been hosted by Sheridan Smith and James Corden (2008/2009), Christopher Biggins and Mel Giedroyc (2010), Miranda Hart in 2011 and Jenny Eclair and Alan Davies in 2012, and Rufus Hound and Mel Giedroyc in 2013 and 2014, Steve Furst and Mel Giedroyc in 2015, Steve Furst with Sarah Hadland, Janie Dee and Preeya Kalidas in 2016 and Vikki Stone and Simon Lipkin in 2017.

== Actor ==
He began his career as a child actor, and at the age of 9 appeared in Annie Get Your Gun at the Prince of Wales Theatre. He then had a career in television and film with his credits including series regular roles as Paul Matlock in the BAFTA and Emmy Award winning The Politician's Wife by Paula Milne playing the son of Juliet Stevenson and Trevor Eve and James MacConnell in Plastic Man with John Thaw and Sorcha Cusack. He also played Serge in Absolutely Fabulous, Richard Kent in The Famous Five, Hubert in The Boot Street Band and John Thornton in Catherine Cookson's The Girl. His films included Hubert in Tom's Midnight Garden for MGM with Greta Scacchi, Penelope Wilton, and Joan Plowright and Steven Carmody in Daisies In December with Joss Ackland and Jean Simmons.

On stage, he was also a member of the National Youth Music Theatre (NYMT) and played Dandy Dan in their West-End production of Bugsy Malone alongside a young cast that included Sheridan Smith, Jamie Bell, Ben Barnes, Hannah Spearritt and James Bourne. In 2021 he played Walter Hobbs in Elf The Musical in 2022 he played Paul Maddens in Nativity the Musical (at the Grand Opera House, York) and in 2023 played Oscar in Sweet Charity. He recorded the role of Judas in Jesus Christ Superstar at Abbey Road Studios (Track 'Heaven on their Minds' now on Spotify and most streaming platforms) and starred as Linus in Snoopy! The Musical in the West End as well as Scrooge The Musical, Me and My Girl and Honk!.
