= Sapphire & Steel =

British supernatural fantasy TV series (1979–1982)

- Genre: Supernatural; Fantasy
- Created by: Peter J. Hammond
- Starring: David McCallum; Joanna Lumley
- Composer: Cyril Ornadel
- Country of origin: United Kingdom
- Original language: English
- No. of series: 4
- No. of episodes: 34 (list of episodes)

Production
- Executive producer: David Reid
- Producer: Shaun O'Riordan
- Running time: 25 minutes
- Production company: ATV/Central

Original release
- Network: ITV
- Release: 10 July 1979 – 31 August 1982

Sapphire & Steel is a British fantasy television series starring David McCallum and Joanna Lumley. Produced by ATV, it ran from 1979 to 1982 on the ITV network. The series was created by Peter J. Hammond who conceived the programme under the working title The Time Menders, after a stay in an allegedly haunted castle. Hammond also wrote all the stories except for the fifth, which was co-written by Don Houghton and Anthony Read.

From 2005 to 2008, Sapphire & Steel returned in a series of audio dramas produced by Big Finish Productions, starring Susannah Harker and David Warner as the main characters.

== Series overview ==
Joanna Lumley and David McCallum as Sapphire and Steel (from Adventure 3)

=== Premise ===
The opening credits include the narration:

All irregularities will be handled by the forces controlling each dimension. Transuranic heavy elements may not be used where there is life. Medium atomic weights are available: Gold, Lead, Copper, Jet, Diamond, Radium, Sapphire, Silver and Steel. Sapphire and Steel have been assigned.

In the sixth and final assignment, Lead was replaced with Mercury in the opening credits.

The programme centres on a pair of interdimensional operatives named Sapphire and Steel. Very little is revealed about their purposes or backgrounds in the course of the series, but they appear to be engaged in guarding the continuing flow of time. They are two of a number of elements that assume human form and are sent to investigate strange events. Others include: Lead (Val Pringle), who takes the aspect of a jovial, friendly giant; and Silver (David Collings), a technician who can melt metals in his hands.

In the series, it is explained that time is like a progressing corridor that surrounds everything, but there are weak spots where time—implied to be a malignant force—can break into the present and take things.

There are also creatures from the beginnings and ends of time that roam the corridor looking for the same weak spots to break through. These breaks are most often triggered by the presence of something old in a modern situation, for example a traditional nursery rhyme, an old photograph, or a house decorated with antiques. Holding onto something of the past opposes progress and allows 'Time' to break into the present — the more old things present, the easier it is for this to occur (such as is seen in episode 1 where the two-century-old house, in which a traditional nursery rhyme has been read hundreds of times as a bedtime story, is full of clocks and other antiques). When this breaking-in of 'Time' occurs, Investigators will be sent to assess the situation and then, if intervention is warranted, Operators are assigned to deal with the problem by a mysterious unseen authority, to be assisted by Specialists if necessary.

Each adventure usually starts with Sapphire and Steel appearing, seemingly out of nowhere, although sometimes they are already present when the story begins. They then investigate and mingle with various humans, although it is nearly always the location the humans are in which is of the most interest: an old house which dates back to the 18th century, an abandoned railway station, a lost property shop, a modern-day motorway petrol station, etc.

The stories are generally quite cryptic, raising more questions than answers, and have an eerie air to them, being as much ghost stories as they are science fiction. The ambiguous nature of the programme extends to its main characters. While Sapphire is portrayed as more affable and "human" than the no-nonsense, grim Steel, it is clear that their prime concern is to deal with the break in Time, sometimes over the safety of the humans caught in the incidents they investigate. The general tone of the series is however forward-looking; that old things are dangerous, and that the past should be left behind or an evil force will be able to enter through those old things. In this situation, progress and newness are portrayed as the protecting force against 'Time'.

=== Characters ===
ITV stated in 1980 that Sapphire and Steel are not human. Their abilities and manner are strange. Steel, for example, often has gaps in his knowledge of human culture and even Sapphire's grace is tempered with a cool detachment from the humans they interact with. In Adventure 5, Steel confirms that they were alien, "in the extraterrestrial sense." The two also refer to being involved in the mystery of the Mary Celeste, and in one case state they will be waiting for a ship to surface in seventy-five years. This could mean they are either exceptionally long-lived or some kind of time travel is involved. P. J. Hammond confirmed the former hypothesis in a 1993 interview.

Sapphire and Steel, who are Operators, are occasionally assisted by other beings, including Lead and Silver. Silver is stated in Adventure 6 to be a Specialist rather than an Operator. There are 127 operatives in total, including 12 transuranic elements, which cannot be assigned where life exists. Although they are described as elements, many of the code names are non-elements, such as Sapphire, Steel, and Jet, although these could be pseudonyms for aesthetics or discretion. Sapphire also has a flirtatious relationship with Silver, contributing to an air of underlying sexual tension on the occasions that Silver is called upon to assist the duo. The relationship between Steel and Sapphire similarly exhibits occasional tension, as evidenced in Adventure 2 when Steel admits feeling love for Sapphire and, at one point, even kissing her on the cheek. In Adventure 1, Lead mentioned that Jet sent Steel her love and that Silver was having relationship troubles with Copper "again".

Among Sapphire's abilities is the power to manipulate time in small ways as well as determine the age or historical details of an object by touching it (psychometry). This latter ability is referred to in Adventure 2 as "spot analysis". Her most prominent ability is to "take back time," rewinding it in a localised area to see or replay the past. She states in Adventure 1 that she cannot take time back twenty-four hours; in the last episode of the same adventure, at Steel's request she takes time back "half a day". In Adventure 2, she is able to "hold time for a day", when another (in this case, the creature seen as the darkness) takes time back over multiple days. Whether this is an improvement in abilities or a different skill entirely is not made clear. She also exhibits an ability to obtain information about people – their ages and backgrounds as well as psychological insights into their personality – just by being close to them. Sometimes it appears that she does not discover this information herself but is receiving the information telepathically from some external source. In Adventure 2, it is stated that the age at which a living person will die is not estimated but recorded, that it is a historical fact. Nothing else is revealed in the television series as to the extent or nature of any such records, or to what extent Sapphire uses them in relation to information obtained directly. She can also manipulate people's emotions, and project illusions. When she uses her powers, her irises will usually glow blue or, under some circumstances, turquoise.

Steel can freeze himself to absolute zero which gives him the ability to destroy 'ghosts', which are in actuality remnants of Time. He apparently possesses immense strength (in Adventure 3 he ties knots in lift cables to prevent the lift from being used) and a degree of invulnerability. He also exhibits telekinetic abilities, being able to paralyse people with a look, weld metal with his bare hands or undo deadbolts with a gesture.

Both Sapphire and Steel (as well as all Operatives) also appear to be able to teleport a great distance.

The operatives can also communicate telepathically with each other, and in Adventure 5, Sapphire grants this ability to a human being, whom she dubs "Brass" for the duration. Sapphire removes this ability at the end of the story. It is also suggested in Adventure 5 that other powers can be granted. It is hinted, in the debate that ensues between Sapphire and Steel after Sapphire gives Brass his abilities, that different powers are classed at different levels, with telepathy being considered one of the most basic.

It is not made clear in the series as to what boundaries exist on the skills of operatives. In Adventure 2, Steel cannot perform "spot analysis", as it is not his field, but in Adventure 4, Sapphire and Steel together are specifically able to replicate Silver's ability to transmutate by remembering what he did.

Other operatives that appear also have special powers. Silver (played by David Collings), a Specialist who is designated as a Technician, is good with electronics and gadgets, is able to transform one small object into another, and is even able to replicate small objects out of nothing. He can also create long-lasting visual images of objects too large to replicate, although the exact parameters for such images are never revealed. Lead (played by Val Pringle), on the other hand, possesses superhuman strength and can act as needed insulation for Steel when he freezes himself to extreme temperatures.

== Production and transmission ==
The programme ran for four years and 34 episodes, each lasting about 25 minutes and generally included a précis of the preceding episode. The first and second stories were shown in the summer of 1979, the second story's transmission interrupted by industrial action at the ITV network which led to a repeat of the story in 1979. The third and fourth stories were transmitted in January 1981, and the fifth in August 1981 with a sixth story "in the can" for future transmission. The audience figures were unusually high for a science fantasy series with the first episode, gaining 11.8 million viewers and finishing as the fourth most watched programme of the week across all channels. This continued with a further seven episodes of the first year appearing in the top 20. Three more episodes in 1981 and one in 1982 also entered the top 20 ratings.

By this time, production costs were increasing. The programme had been allocated a minuscule production budget, which led to the use of simple staging and minimal special effects, ultimately contributing to the uneasy atmosphere of the show. The high profile and limited availability of the principal actors, Lumley and McCallum, meant that shooting was somewhat sporadic, and the programme's producers ATV were in the process of being reorganised into the new Central Independent Television; all factors which led to the series' demise. Central felt that viewers might mistake the new programmes for repeats of old ones, and broadcast the final, four-part story in late August 1982 to very little fanfare. Despite this, the first episode gained a high rating and finished in the top 20 most-watched programmes of the week. The show has never been repeated on UK terrestrial television, but some episodes were shown on the satellite and cable station Bravo in the mid-1990s. The program is available free online at ShoutFactoryTV.com and Freevee, and with a subscription at Prime Video or ITVX.

The UK digital channel Forces TV acquired the series, showing two episodes each weekday evening from 1 June 2020. The complete series was added to BritBox in August, 2020 and is currently also available to stream free in the UK on ITVX Player. The UK digital channel Rewind TV began showing the series, again two episodes each day from October 2024.

As of April 2025, episodes 1-6 of Adventure One - Escape Through A Crack In Time are available to view on the ITV Retro YouTube Channel.

== Television stories ==
For more information see List of Sapphire & Steel serials

None of the stories had on-screen titles, or any official titles assigned by the writers. The Region 1 Complete Series DVD release gives the titles "Escape Through a Crack in Time", "The Railway Station", "The Creature's Revenge", "The Man Without a Face", "Dr McDee Must Die" and "The Trap", respectively. These titles have often been cited as having been created by science fiction magazine Time Screen. Further reading reveals that in the booklet for the series, written by Tim Worthington, and included with the most recent DVD box set, on page 7 there is this quote regarding titles from creator P. J. Hammond "I never gave titles to the stories. Neither did the production department. I think certain fanbases may have made up their own titles in order to discuss and analyse various stories." The various British home video releases title the stories as "Adventure" or "Assignment" I through VI.

The booklet also says, on the same page, "some sources have claimed that these were taken from the original scripts, whereas others dismiss them as an invention on the part of a science fiction fanzine, although the editor of the fanzine in question denies that they were ever used within its pages" and furthermore that "the show's distributors have never knowingly used them."

The final television story ends on a cliffhanger. Apparently resentful of Sapphire and Steel's independence, a higher authority sends entities known as Transient Beings (similar to the operatives but until now trapped in the past), to set a trap for them in a motorway café. The serial concludes with Silver dispatched to an unknown fate –and Sapphire and Steel being trapped in the café, floating through space, apparently for eternity. The cliffhanger has never been resolved, although Hammond has stated that vague plans existed for further adventures. This was also stated by Joanna Lumley in her autobiography, who remembered that they were told that this was merely an end-of-series cliffhanger, and that Sapphire and Steel would be freed at the start of the next series. However, in an interview with Doctor Who Magazine (#329, cover date: 30 April 2003), David Collings recalled that although another series was planned, Joanna Lumley and David McCallum both decided that they had had enough and did not wish to do any more.

== Merchandise ==
Sapphire & Steel novelisation of the first adventure

One novelisation of the series was released.

A two-page coloured Sapphire & Steel picture strip, written by Angus Allan and drawn by Arthur Ranson, appeared in the Look-In magazine. It ran for a total of 76 issues from 1979–81 — with a break of 13 issues between runs — and formed 14 untitled stories. It would appear that Ranson used photographs of Joanna Lumley and David McCallum from the first television adventure for reference, as Sapphire and Steel are almost always depicted wearing the outfits from this story. In the third story, Lead makes a cameo appearance and displays a further power: turning British soldiers from the Napoleonic War into miniature (and presumably lead) toy soldiers. However, the picture strip version of Lead —though depicted as a powerfully built black man — was not based upon Val Pringle who played the part on television; it can only be assumed that Ranson had very little in the way of photographic reference material in this case. In addition, a one-off Sapphire & Steel text story titled The Albatross was published in the 1981 Look-In Annual. This was illustrated in black-and-white by Arthur Ranson.

Only one Sapphire & Steel Annual was published, in late 1980, by World International Publishing Ltd, and featured a number of text stories and features. The front cover used the same photograph as that on P.J. Hammond's 1979 Star Books novelisation of Adventure One.

P.J. Hammond did not write the stories for Sapphire & Steel Annual 1981, but he was sent proofs to read in advance of publication. His only reservations with the stories were that Sapphire and Steel were able to move back in time, which he felt tended to contradict the premise set in the television series that Time was only allowed to break into the present day. However, this did not worry Hammond too much as, like Look-In, the Annual was aimed at younger readers.

== Home media ==
The series was released twice on home video during the 1990s, with each serial available separately as a single or double-cassette set. Stories were labelled "Adventure" in the first releases (in lieu of story titles) and "Assignment" for the second release.

In 2002, the series was released for the first time on DVD, in the UK. Originally, it was released as two box-sets, with the first three stories on one (20 episodes) and the final three on the other (14 episodes). Also in the UK, Network Distributing Ltd Home Entertainment released the complete series on DVD on 5 November 2007. The six-disc set features a new documentary and commentaries. On 26 May 2008, the complete series box-set was re-released with new packaging.

In the US, A&E Home Entertainment, under license from Carlton International Media Limited, released the entire series on Region 1 DVD on 28 December 2004 and Shout! Factory re-released the complete series on 27 August 2013.

On 20th March 2025, the official ITV Retro YouTube page - a channel dedicated to archiving classic ITV programming - uploaded Assignment One as an edited continuous HD video, running 2hrs 10mins, with Assignments Two through Six uploaded in a similar 'movie' format over the following month (the longest running being Assignment Two at just over three hours).

== Audio plays ==
For more information see List of Sapphire & Steel serials

In late May 2004, Big Finish Productions announced that it had secured the rights to produce a new series of Sapphire & Steel audio adventures for release on CD. However, neither McCallum nor Lumley reprised their roles: McCallum was working in the United States and Lumley declined to play Sapphire again. The characters were recast, with Susannah Harker and David Warner taking over the roles. The range is produced by Nigel Fairs and Jason Haigh-Ellery.

The character of Gold (played by Mark Gatiss) appears in the first adventure The Passenger and returns in Perfect Day and Zero. He is portrayed as impatient and inexperienced when dealing with both humans and the various manifestations of Time, even more detached and clinical in many ways than Steel, almost as if he is still in training. The character of Ruby (played by Lisa Bowerman) appears in the second series story Water Like a Stone, reappearing in Cruel Immortality and Second Sight. Her character has an understanding and affinity to Time within the rhythms of music, and also comes across as rather dry and sardonic, especially when interacting with Steel. David Collings reprises his role as Silver in the third and fifth stories of the first series of audio plays and then again in the third story of the third series. During the production of each series, Nigel Fairs has had to step in at late notice to write a replacement script (writing Dead Man Walking from John Ainsworth's outline in series one, replacing Gary Russell's Big Fun with Cruel Immortality in series two and replacing Joseph Lidster's Reborn with Second Sight in series three).

Big Finish originally said that the new stories would be set before the climactic final story of the television series. Still, the released plays are actually set after assignment 6. At the start of The Passenger, the characters comment that it has been a long time since they last worked together and, in Cruel Immortality, imply that they were freed in some unspecified way by Silver.

At the end of The Mystery of the Missing Hour, Sapphire and Steel once again find themselves trapped. The following story, Second Sight sees the characters 'reborn' once more - this time in the guise of two young Australians, played by Blair McDonough and Anna Skellern. At the end of Second Sight, however, Ruby was able to release the previous incarnations of Sapphire and Steel from their trap - with David Warner and Susannah Harker reprising their roles for the rest of the series.

The audio dramas featured some notable guest stars - including Hugo Myatt, Muriel Pavlow, Daphne Oxenford, Lucy Gaskell, Colin Baker, Sarah Douglas, Sam Kelly, David Horovitch, Mark Gatiss and Louise Jameson.

== Planned remakes ==
A remake of Sapphire & Steel has been suggested a few times, but the plans never came to fruition. Original series creator, Peter J. Hammond, said that he had discussions with ITV about a remake in 2006, but no developments followed. According to reports, "the backlash to the US remake of The Prisoner [...] put an end to the idea". In July 2015, Luther creator Neil Cross announced to Variety that he was working on a new series of Sapphire & Steel. The following year, ITV Studios-owned independent Big Talk Productions confirmed that it was remaking Sapphire & Steel, with Cross attached to the project, and writer Ed Hime indicating that he was part of the team. However, in a December 2017 interview with Deadline Hollywood, Cross said that the project had been cancelled, mainly due to the limited popularity of the original show.

== Notes ==
The series was re-broadcast on ITV4 from 25 November 2026 onwards.
