= Big Finish Productions =

British company producing books and audio dramas

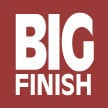
- Type: Private company
- Industry: Entertainment
- Founded: 1996; 30 years ago
- Headquarters: Berkshire, UK
- Key people: Jason Haigh-Ellery, MD; Nicholas Briggs, Executive Producer; Kris Griffin, Marketing Consultant; Barnaby Edwards, Casting Director; David Richardson, Producer; Ian Atkins, Producer's Assistant; Xanna Eve Chown, Books Production
- Products: List of Doctor Who audio plays by Big Finish; List of Doctor Who spin off audio plays by Big Finish; List of Dark Shadows audio plays List of Blake's 7 audio plays The Avengers (audio drama); The Prisoner (audio drama)
- Website: www.bigfinish.com

Big Finish Productions is a British company that produces books and audio plays (released straight to compact disc and for download in MP3 and m4b format) based, primarily, on science fiction properties. These include Doctor Who, the characters Judge Dredd and Strontium Dog from 2000 AD, Blake's 7, Thunderbirds, Dark Shadows, Dracula, Terrahawks, Sapphire & Steel, Sherlock Holmes, Stargate, The Avengers, The Prisoner, Timeslip, and Torchwood.

== History ==
Founded in 1996, Big Finish in late 1998 began releasing audio plays adapted from the New Adventures, a series of novels from Virgin Books which had originally been licensed Doctor Who stories, but by then had become officially independent from the show and were based around the character of Bernice "Benny" Summerfield. In 1999, Big Finish obtained a non-exclusive licence to produce official Doctor Who plays, beginning with the multi-Doctor story The Sirens of Time. Doctor Who and spin-offs have remained the main part of the company's output ever since, although they have since diversified. Many of those initially involved in Big Finish had worked on the Audio Visuals fan series of unlicensed Doctor Who audio plays.

The name of the company was taken from the episode "The Big Finish" of the 1989–1993 ITV series Press Gang. On 25 July 2019, Big Finish made a statement about equality and diversity in response to requests from fans wishing the company to make a statement on the views expressed by a few individuals that Big Finish have worked with. The company stated that it is committed to ensuring that those working for the company are protected from discrimination due to age, disability, gender reassignment, marriage, pregnancy or maternity leave, race, religion, sex and sexual orientation.

=== Organisation ===
Until July 2006, Gary Russell served as producer of the Doctor Who audios. When Russell left the company, Jason Haigh-Ellery and Nicholas Briggs took joint responsibility as Co-Executive Producers. Briggs now bears creative responsibility for Big Finish's Doctor Who range, along with script editor Alan Barnes. David Richardson holds the title of senior producer across all ranges, organising the schedules across the company's output, as well as having creative producer responsibility for The Companion Chronicles, Lost Stories, and the spin-off Jago & Litefoot. The Chairman and co-executive producer of the company is Jason Haigh-Ellery.

=== Big Finish Day ===
Big Finish Day is a fan convention featuring guest appearances by Big Finish actors. On 11 June 2011, Tenth Planet Events hosted the first Big Finish Day in Barking. On 11 February 2012, a second one was held. As of September 2015, there have been seven Big Finish Days, with more planned.

=== Downloads ===
In February 2008, Big Finish launched a new download service through their website, which would provide audio plays in MP3 format, free of any digital rights management. They currently provide the large majority of their catalogue in MP3 and M4B format, with very few outstanding exceptions. In late April 2008, Big Finish released a download subscription service that mirrors its physical CD service. In addition, those who purchase Big Finish productions on CD through the company's website receive access to a complimentary download of the story. In September 2008, they released their first free downloadable play. UNIT: The Coup had previously been given away with an issue of Doctor Who Magazine. On 8 February 2017, they announced the Big Finish app. On 25 July 2024, they announced a new Big Finish app and website overhaul. This was met with backlash from customers and the website was reverted back to its previous state on August 15 2024, whilst the original app was restored on 17 October 2024, following a series of apologies from Jason Haigh-Ellery.

== Available releases ==
=== Doctor Who ===
The Doctor Who audio plays have, to date, featured nine of the thirteen living actors to play the character of the Doctor in the series (Tom Baker, Peter Davison, Colin Baker, Sylvester McCoy, Paul McGann, Christopher Eccleston, David Tennant, Jodie Whittaker and Jo Martin), as well as many of the regular supporting actors over the many years of the programme. The late Jon Pertwee's voice is featured in the 40th-anniversary story Zagreus. His part in the story was pieced together from snippets of Pertwee's dialogue from the fan-produced Doctor Who video "Devious". The actor John Hurt also recorded appearances as the War Doctor for Big Finish prior to his death in 2017.

Destiny of the Doctor, produced in conjunction with AudioGO, who were rights holders to the 2005–present series, marked the first time Big Finish produced storylines featuring the Ninth, Tenth, and Eleventh Doctors to mark the 50th anniversary of the franchise. In February 2015, Big Finish announced that following a licensing deal with BBC Worldwide, they had been permitted to produce an audio series entitled UNIT: Extinction, starring Kate Stewart played by Jemma Redgrave. The debut of the character on audio marks the second time Big Finish have been actively permitted to utilise material introduced in the 2005 revival.

In May 2015, Big Finish announced a new series of Torchwood, featuring Captain Jack Harkness (John Barrowman). Since this announcement. In 2017, Big Finish announced six new stories of Class featuring original members of the class, as well as a story starring Ace (Sophie Aldred). On 27 June 2015, it was announced that Big Finish would produce a line of stories featuring River Song and the Eighth Doctor, as well as stories from Winston Churchill (Ian McNeice) and his interactions with the Doctor. Further it was announced that a special set would be released featuring classic Doctors (in this case, the Fifth, Sixth, Seventh, and Eighth Doctors), with new series monsters (The Weeping Angels, the Judoon, the Sycorax, and the Sontarans). The latter story will also connect into the Time War. According to Big Finish's website in May 2018, their license was expanded to feature properties set during the Twelfth Doctor's era up until Twice Upon a Time. This has allowed Big Finish to explore more recent characters and areas from Doctor Who, as seen in Paternoster Gang; Jenny, The Doctor's Daughter; and Tales from New Earth.

Developments in the 2005 revival TV series also impacted the availability of certain characters. For example, Big Finish was no longer allowed to use the character of Davros, following his return to the series in 2008, although this restriction has since been lifted and Davros returned to Big Finish in The Curse of Davros (January 2012). Prior to the character's being featured in the new series, he had been used in several plays, portrayed by Terry Molloy, who played Davros in three TV serials in the 1980s. In a 2008 podcast, Nicholas Briggs explained that all scripts are sent through the TV show's offices in Cardiff to prevent any potential conflicts in continuity.

The return of Sarah Jane Smith to the continuity of the TV series, and subsequent The Sarah Jane Adventures spin-off, resulted in the character's no longer being available to Big Finish (forcing the cancellation of an ongoing Sarah Jane Smith audio series). According to Briggs, permission from Russell T Davies, producer and creator of The Sarah Jane Adventures, had been secured that would have allowed the character (and actress Elisabeth Sladen) to return to Big Finish for a series of stories alongside Tom Baker's Fourth Doctor, but Sladen's illness and death in April 2011 put an end to those plans, until 2020, when it was announced that Sladen's daughter, Sadie Miller would take over her mother's role as Sarah Jane, starting in 2021, with the release of Return of the Cybermen.

To celebrate the 50th anniversary of Doctor Who in 2013, Big Finish created a series in the style of The Companion Chronicles range titled Destiny of the Doctor narrated by companions throughout the show's history. In addition to this, Big Finish released a multi-doctor story featuring all surviving Doctors of the classic series and almost every companion in The Light at the End. Big Finish also published a series of short story anthologies taking place in the Doctor Who universe under the overall title of Short Trips. Three Short Trips collections were published by BBC Books in the late 1990s, before a hardback short story anthology licence was granted to Big Finish, who took over the name and produced them until their licence to publish such stories was revoked in the spring of 2009. Big Finish currently continues to produce audio-only Short Trips productions.

In 2016, Big Finish's licence to produce Doctor Who audios was extended to 20 June 2025. In 2019, Big Finish reached its 20th anniversary of producing Doctor Who audios and released a special: The Legacy of Time which combined several spin-offs, including UNIT, The Diary of River Song, Bernice Summerfield and Counter-Measures. Other celebratory releases included the third series of Ravenous (featuring almost all Eighth Doctor companions); fourth series of Ravenous (featuring multiple incarnations of the Master; the sixth Series of the Early Adventures (in which the First Doctor encountered the Second Doctor, as well as using the character of Katerina for the first time); The Diary of River Song series 5 (the first appearance of Eric Roberts' Master since the 1996 film and the return of Missy).

In August 2020, Big Finish announced a new series of audios beginning release in May 2021, featuring Christopher Eccleston reprising his role as the Ninth Doctor (for the first time since his departure from the series in 2005). In December 2021, Big Finish announced that their license to produce Doctor Who audios was extended until the 31st of March 2030. In June 2022, Big Finish announced that in November of the same year, the prices of all unreleased boxsets as of that month would see an increase in price due to the rising costs of production and supply costs. These new prices are yet to be announced as of the 15th of September 2022. In July 2024, it was announced that Jodie Whittaker and Mandip Gill would be reprising their roles as the Thirteenth Doctor and Yasmin Khan respectively for a new series of audio plays titled The Thirteenth Doctor Adventures. The first of these plays is due to be released in July 2025.

==== Doctor Who spin-offs ====
Other spin-offs include the Gallifrey series (with Lalla Ward as Romana, Louise Jameson as Leela and John Leeson as K-9); the Dalek Empire series; the UNIT series; the Iris Wildthyme series starring Katy Manning; the Sarah Jane Smith series and the I, Davros series. Big Finish have also produced a series of Doctor Who plays based on alternative scenarios (for example, what if the Doctor had never left Gallifrey, or had been a woman), collectively titled Doctor Who Unbound. This has allowed them to cast other actors in the role of the Doctor, including Sir Derek Jacobi, Arabella Weir and David Warner. In 2013, following the death of original Romana actress Mary Tamm, Big Finish introduced a previously unknown third incarnation of Romana, played by American actress Juliet Landau.

Other spin-off series include Jago & Litefoot, featuring Henry Gordon Jago (Christopher Benjamin) and Professor George Litefoot (Trevor Baxter), characters from the 1970s storyline The Talons of Weng-Chiang; Counter-Measures, featuring a group of scientists featured in 1988's Remembrance of the Daleks; Vienna, focusing on an assassin named Vienna Salvatori (played by former Star Trek: Deep Space Nine actress Chase Masterson) who was introduced in the Seventh Doctor audio drama The Shadow Heart; UNIT, originally focused around the UNIT during the hiatus years of Doctor Who, starring the Seventh Doctor (Sylvester McCoy) and Elizabeth Klein (Tracey Childs, who first appeared in Colditz) and later became focused on UNIT from the revived series, featuring Kate Stewart (Jemma Redgrave) and Osgood (Ingrid Oliver), as well as guest characters Jo Grant, River Song (Alex Kingston) and Doctor Chin Lee (Pik-Sen Lim, who first appeared in the Ambassadors of Death).

Two TV spin-offs from the Doctor Who universe have been continued in audio form by Big Finish: Torchwood and Class which has featured the return of several characters from the original cast: Gwen Cooper (Eve Myles), Owen Harper (Burn Gorman), Toshiko Sato (Naoko Mori), Ianto Jones (Gareth David-Lloyd), Rhys Williams (Kai Owen), Andy Davidson (Tom Price), Suzie Costello (Indira Varma), Captain John Hart (James Marsters) and Bilis Manger (Murray Melvin) have all reprised their roles in Torchwood. Characters from Doctor Who have also appeared in Torchwood audios, including Yvonne Hartman (Tracy-Ann Oberman) and Jo Grant. Big Finish have also created several new characters of Torchwood in their continuation of the series from Miracle Day, most notably Tyler Steele (Jonny Green). Starting with January 2017, Big Finish also began releasing the "Torchwood One" series set before the events of Doomsday (Doctor Who). Other writers for Big Finish include Rob Shearman and The League of Gentlemen's Mark Gatiss, who have also written for the 2005 relaunch of the Doctor Who television series. Shearman's 2005 TV episode "Dalek" has been acknowledged as being based upon his Big Finish storyline Jubilee.

=== Blake's 7 ===
In July 2011, Big Finish obtained a licence to produce audiobooks and novels based on the BBC television series Blake's 7. On 1 February 2012, the first collection of audiobooks, Blake's 7: The Liberator Chronicles, was released featuring original cast members from the television series. Eleven more followed. Since then, five series of full cast audio dramas have been released.

=== Earthsearch ===
Earthsearch was a BBC Radio 4 radio series written by James Follett which was later adapted as a science fiction novel. However, his prequel novel Earthsearch Mindwarp was adapted by Big Finish and broadcast by Digital radio station BBC 7. Earthsearch Mindwarp stars a number of actors from the Doctor Who range — India Fisher, Nicholas Courtney and Colin Baker.

=== Sapphire & Steel ===
Big Finish produced and sold three seasons of Sapphire & Steel audios on CD until their licence expired. As both actors declined to reprise their original TV roles, Susannah Harker played Sapphire (replacing Joanna Lumley) and David Warner played Steel (replacing David McCallum), although David Collings did reprise his role of Silver from the TV series in several releases. In March 2024, Big Finish made the stories from all three seasons available once more as digital downloads. This is the first time these have been available in more than a decade.

== Former releases ==
=== 2000 AD ===
Between 2002 and 2004, Big Finish released eighteen audio plays featuring characters from the British sci-fi comic strip anthology magazine 2000 AD. These consisted of sixteen Judge Dredd stories with two additional plays featuring characters from the Strontium Dog strip. The Judge Dredd series drew heavily upon Big Finish's repertory company established through their Doctor Who series with many actors crossing over such as Toby Longworth (who voiced Dredd), Clare Buckfield, Nicholas Briggs, Mark Donovan and Teresa Gallagher who voiced Chief Judge Hershey. The series would also feature many special guest stars such as The League of Gentlemen's Mark Gatiss playing Judge Death, Doctor Who companion actress Nicola Bryant (who would also direct 99 Code Red!) plus Blake's 7 star Stephen Greif as Efil Drago San. Writers for the series included David Bishop, Dave Stone and James Swallow

=== The Tomorrow People ===
Big Finish also produced and sold 5 seasons of The Tomorrow People audios until renewed licence negotiations failed in late 2007, the range was withdrawn in total in December 2008.

== Other productions ==
Big Finish has released audio dramas based upon other works as well, including Dark Shadows, Sherlock Holmes, Stargate, Captain Scarlet, Terrahawks, The Avengers, and The Picture of Dorian Gray. In 2016, Big Finish produced and released its first series of The Prisoner stories, written and directed by Nicholas Briggs and starring Mark Elstob in the Patrick McGoohan role. In July 2018, Big Finish released audiobook versions of the first two novels of the Star Trek: Prometheus trilogy. Narrated by Alec Newman, these releases adapt Fire with Fire and The Root of All Rage, with the third story—In the Heart of Chaos—released in December 2018.

== Awards and nominations ==
Name of the award ceremony, year presented, category, nominee(s) of the award, and the result of the nomination
Award ceremony	Year	Category	Work(s)	Result	Ref.
Audio and Radio Industry Awards	2021	Best Fictional Storytelling	Doctor Who: Out of Time	Nominated	
Audio and Radio Industry Awards	2021	Best Fictional Storytelling	The Human Frontier 1	Nominated	
Audio and Radio Industry Awards	2026	Best Drama or Fiction	Doctor Who: Hooklight	Pending	
Audie Awards	2015	Best Package Design	Doctor Who: The Light at the End	Won	
Audie Awards	2015	Best Audio Drama	The Avengers, Lost Episodes Vol 1: Hot Snow	Nominated	
Audie Awards	2017	Best Audio Drama	Doctor Who: Death and the Queen	Nominated	
Audie Awards	2017	Best Audio Drama	Doctor Who: The War Doctor: Only The Monstrous	Nominated	
Audie Awards	2018	Best Audio Drama	Cicero	Nominated	
Audie Awards	2019	Best Audio Drama	The Martian Invasion of Earth	Won	
Audie Awards	2021	Best Audio Drama	Doctor Who: Stranded 1	Won	
Audie Awards	2021	Best Audio Drama	ATA Girl 2	Nominated	
BBC Audio Drama Awards	2014	Best Online or Non-Broadcast Drama	Doctor Who: Dark Eyes	Won	
BBC Audio Drama Awards	2015	Best Online or Non-Broadcast Drama	Survivors: Revelation	Nominated	
BBC Audio Drama Awards	2015	Best Online or Non-Broadcast Drama	Doctor Who: The Light at the End	Longlisted	
BBC Audio Drama Awards	2015	Best Online or Non-Broadcast Drama	Jago & Litefoot: Encore of the Scorchies	Longlisted	
BBC Audio Drama Awards	2015	Best Debut Performance	Alex Jordan (Frankenstein)	Nominated	
BBC Audio Drama Awards	2016	Best Online Only Audio Drama	The Omega Factor: The Old Gods	Nominated	
BBC Audio Drama Awards	2016	Best Online Only Audio Drama	Dark Shadows: Bloodlust	Shortlisted	
BBC Audio Drama Awards	2016	Best Online Only Audio Drama	Survivors: The Hunted	Shortlisted	
BBC Audio Drama Awards	2016	Best Online Only Audio Drama	The Judgement of Sherlock Holmes	Shortlisted	
BBC Audio Drama Awards	2017	Best Online Only Audio Drama	Doctor Who: Absent Friends	Won	
BBC Audio Drama Awards	2017	Best Online Only Audio Drama	Torchwood: More Than This	Nominated	
BBC Audio Drama Awards	2017	Best Online Only Audio Drama	Doctor Who: Death and the Queen	Shortlisted	
BBC Audio Drama Awards	2018	Best Actor	John Hurt (The Invisible Man Chapter 1)	Nominated	
BBC Audio Drama Awards	2018	Best Podcast or Online Audio Drama	King Lear	Shortlisted	
BBC Audio Drama Awards	2018	Best Podcast or Online Audio Drama	The Prisoner: I Met a Man Today	Shortlisted	
BBC Audio Drama Awards	2019	Best Podcast or Online Audio Drama	ATA Girl	Nominated	
BBC Audio Drama Awards	2019	Best Podcast or Online Audio Drama	Blind Terror: The Gods of Frost	Shortlisted	
BBC Audio Drama Awards	2019	Best Actor	Derek Jacobi (The War Master: Beneath the Viscoid)	Shortlisted	
BBC Audio Drama Awards	2023	Best Podcast Audio Drama	Doctor Who: The Ninth Doctor Adventures	Shortlisted	
British Audio Awards	2025	Audiobook: Science Fiction and Fantasy	Doctor Who: The Stuff of Legend, The Live Show	Nominated	
Scribe Awards	2012	Best Audio	Doctor Who: The Many Deaths of Jo Grant	Nominated	
Scribe Awards	2013	Best Audio	Dark Shadows: The Eternal Actress	Won	
Scribe Awards	2013	Best Audio	Dark Shadows: Dress Me	Nominated	
Scribe Awards	2013	Best Audio	Doctor Who: Project: Nirvana	Nominated	
Scribe Awards	2014	Best Audio	Blake's 7: The Armageddon Storm	Won	
Scribe Awards	2014	Best Audio	Dark Shadows: The Phantom Bride	Nominated	
Scribe Awards	2014	Best Audio	Dark Shadows: The Flip Side	Nominated	
Scribe Awards	2015	Best Audio	Doctor Who: Iterations of I	Won	
Scribe Awards	2015	Best Audio	Dark Shadows: The Darkest Shadow	Nominated	
Scribe Awards	2015	Best Audio	Dark Shadows: The Devil Cat	Nominated	
Scribe Awards	2015	Best Audio	Blake's 7: Fortuitas	Nominated	
Scribe Awards	2015	Best Audio	Pathfinder Legends: The Skinsaw Murders	Nominated	
Scribe Awards	2016	Best Audio	Doctor Who: The Red Lady	Won	
Scribe Awards	2016	Best Audio	Dark Shadows: Bloodlust	Nominated	
Scribe Awards	2016	Best Audio	Dark Shadows: In the Twinkling of an Eye	Nominated	
Scribe Awards	2016	Best Audio	Doctor Who: Damaged Goods	Nominated	
Scribe Awards	2016	Best Audio	Pathfinder Legends: Mummy's Mask: Empty Graves	Nominated	
Scribe Awards	2017	Best Audio	Dark Shadows: Blood & Fire	Won	
Scribe Awards	2017	Best Audio	Doctor Who: The Mouthless Dead	Nominated	
Scribe Awards	2017	Best Audio	Torchwood: Broken	Nominated	
Scribe Awards	2017	Best Audio	Torchwood: Uncanny Valley	Nominated	
Scribe Awards	2018	Best Audio	Doctor Who: Across the Darkened City	Nominated	
Scribe Awards	2018	Best Audio	Doctor Who: Cold Vengeance	Nominated	
Scribe Awards	2018	Best Audio	Torchwood: torchwood_cascade_CDrip.tor	Nominated	
Scribe Awards	2018	Best Audio	Torchwood: The Dying Room	Nominated	
Scribe Awards	2019	Best Audio	Doctor Who: The Calendar Man	Won	
Scribe Awards	2019	Best Audio	Doctor Who: The Invention of Death	Nominated	
Scribe Awards	2019	Best Audio	Blake's 7: The Way Ahead	Nominated	
Scribe Awards	2019	Best Audio	Dark Shadows: The Girl Beneath the Water	Nominated	
Scribe Awards	2019	Best Audio	The War Master: The Master of Callous	Nominated	
Scribe Awards	2020	Best Audio	Doctor Who: The Creeping Death	Won	
Scribe Awards	2020	Best Audio	Doctor Who: Daybreak	Nominated	
Scribe Awards	2020	Best Audio	The Diary of River Song: Concealed Weapon	Nominated	
Scribe Awards	2020	Best Audio	Torchwood: Sargasso	Nominated	
Scribe Awards	2021	Best Audio	Doctor Who: Out of Time	Won	
Scribe Awards	2021	Best Audio	Torchwood: Tropical Beach Sounds and Other Relaxing Seascapes #4	Won	
Scribe Awards	2021	Best Audio	Doctor Who: The Enemy of My Enemy	Nominated	
Scribe Awards	2021	Best Audio	Doctor Who: He Kills Me, He Kills Me Not	Nominated	
Scribe Awards	2021	Best Audio	Torchwood: Save Our Souls	Nominated	
Scribe Awards	2022	Best Audio	Doctor Who: The Curse of Lady Macbeth	Won	
Scribe Awards	2022	Best Audio	Doctor Who: The Lost Resort	Nominated	
Scribe Awards	2022	Best Audio	Doctor Who: Girl Deconstructed	Nominated	
Scribe Awards	2022	Best Audio	Doctor Who: Monsters in Metropolis	Nominated	
Scribe Awards	2022	Best Audio	Doctor Who: The Truth of Peladon	Nominated	
Scribe Awards	2022	Best Audio	Doctor Who: The Annihilators	Nominated	
Scribe Awards	2023	Best Audio	Doctor Who: Peake Season	Nominated	
Scribe Awards	2023	Best Audio	Doctor Who: Previously Next Time	Nominated	
Scribe Awards	2023	Best Audio	Doctor Who: He Who Fights Monsters	Nominated	
Scribe Awards	2023	Best Audio	Doctor Who: Albie's Angels	Nominated	
Scribe Awards	2024	Best Audio	Doctor Who: All's Fair	Nominated	
Scribe Awards	2024	Best Audio	The Robots: Face to Face	Nominated	
Scribe Awards	2024	Best Audio	Doctor Who: Pursuit of the Nightjar	Nominated	
Scribe Awards	2024	Best Audio	Doctor Who: Sins of the Flesh	Won	
Scribe Awards	2024	Best Audio	Doctor Who: Spirit of the Season	Nominated	
Scribe Awards	2025	Best Audio	Doctor Who: Archipelago	Won	
Scribe Awards	2025	Best Audio	Star Cops: Blood Moon	Won	
Scribe Awards	2025	Best Audio	Doctor Who: Nowhere, Never	Nominated	
Scribe Awards	2025	Best Audio	Doctor Who: The Krillitane Feint	Nominated	
Scribe Awards	2025	Best Audio	Doctor Who: Cass-cade	Nominated	

=== World records ===
Name of record body, year the record was awarded, name of the record, and the name of the record holder
Publication	Year	World record	Record holder	Ref.
Guinness World Records	2021	Longest running science fiction audio play series	Doctor Who: The Monthly Adventures	

== See also ==
- Big Finish Short Trips
- Dark Shadows audio dramas
- List of Doctor Who audio plays by Big Finish
- List of Stargate audiobooks
