= Spank (disambiguation) =

Spanking is a form of corporal punishment.

Spank, Spanked, or The Spank may also refer to:

- "Spank" (song), a 1999 song by Rachel Stamp
- Spank!, a 1999 film
- Spank! The Fifty Shades Parody, a 2012 musical
- "The Spank", a 1978 song by James Brown
- "Spank", a 2004 song by Kenny Wayne Shepherd from The Place You're In
- "Spanked", a 1991 song by Van Halen from For Unlawful Carnal Knowledge

== See also ==
- Raúl Spank (born 1988), German high jumper
