= Ninth Doctor =

Fictional character from Doctor Who

The Doctor
The Ninth Doctor
- Doctor Who character
- Christopher Eccleston as the Ninth Doctor
- First regular appearance: "Rose" (2005)
- Last regular appearance: "The Parting of the Ways" (2005)
- Introduced by: Russell T Davies
- Portrayed by: Christopher Eccleston
- Preceded by: Paul McGann (Eighth Doctor)
- Succeeded by: David Tennant (Tenth Doctor)

Information
- Tenure: 26 March – 18 June 2005
- No of series: 1
- Appearances: 10 stories (13 episodes)
- Companions: Rose Tyler; Adam Mitchell; Jack Harkness
- Chronology: Series 1 (2005)

The Ninth Doctor is an incarnation of the Doctor, the protagonist of the British science fiction television series Doctor Who. He is portrayed by Christopher Eccleston during the first series of the show's revival in 2005. As with previous incarnations of the Doctor, the character has also appeared in other Doctor Who spinoffs both during and after the character's televised appearances. While initially only serving a one series run in the role, Eccleston would later go on to reprise the role in multiple audio stories with Big Finish.

Within the series' narrative, the Doctor is a centuries-old alien Time Lord from the planet Gallifrey who travels in time and space in the TARDIS, frequently with companions. At the end of his life, the Doctor regenerates into a new version of himself, with a changed physical appearance and personality. Eccleston's incarnation of the Doctor is a war-torn loner who is more pragmatic and less eccentric than his previous selves, fiercely determined to protect the innocent at all costs, and prone to using humour to mask the trauma he has as a result of the Time War. Preceded in regeneration by the Eighth Doctor (Paul McGann) and the War Doctor (John Hurt), he is followed by the Tenth Doctor (David Tennant).

To fit in with a 21st-century audience, the Doctor was given the primary companion Rose Tyler (Billie Piper), who was designed to be just as independent and courageous as the Doctor. The Doctor and Rose also briefly travel with Adam Mitchell (Bruno Langley) and are later joined by Captain Jack Harkness (John Barrowman), a reformed con man from the 51st century. The Doctor, Rose, and Jack form a close team but are separated in the series finale in which each character has to make difficult choices and face sacrifice.

== Appearances ==
=== Television ===
The Ninth Doctor first appears in the episode "Rose" where he rescues 19-year-old shop worker Rose Tyler (Billie Piper) from an Auton attack in the department store where she works. After Rose helps the Doctor defeat the Nestene Consciousness, he invites her to travel with him in the TARDIS. On their first trip in "The End of the World", the Doctor takes Rose to witness the destruction of planet Earth in the year five billion. It is revealed that the Doctor's own species, the Time Lords, have been destroyed and the Doctor is the last of his kind. Following from this, they visit Cardiff in 1869 in "The Unquiet Dead", where they encounter author Charles Dickens, of whom the Doctor claims to be a big fan. When faced with a near-death situation, the Doctor tells Rose that he was glad to have met her. In "Aliens of London", when taking Rose home, the Doctor accidentally returns to Earth 12 months after they left. Because of his actions, he is treated like an Internet predator by Rose's mother Jackie (Camille Coduri) and Rose's boyfriend Mickey (Noel Clarke) has become Rose's murder suspect. After Mickey helps the Doctor and Rose defeat the Slitheen by firing a missile at their base at 10 Downing Street in "World War Three", the Doctor offers Mickey a place in the TARDIS with them but he refuses. In the episode "Dalek", the Doctor encounters a Dalek, though he had believed the race to be extinct as the Time War between the Time Lords and Daleks concluded with the mutual annihilation of both races—an event for which the Doctor himself was responsible. The Doctor tortures the surviving Dalek and at the end of the episode prepares to kill it in cold blood. He refrains once Rose calls him out on this.

Adam Mitchell (Bruno Langley) joins the Doctor and Rose as companion at the end of "Dalek". However, when he tries to smuggle future knowledge from Satellite Five in the year 200,000 back to his own time in "The Long Game", the Doctor expels him from the TARDIS. The Doctor is angry at Rose after he takes her to the event of father Pete Tyler's (Shaun Dingwall) death and she saves his life, causing a paradox in "Father's Day". However, when Pete dies to restore the timeline he shows compassion and encourages her to sit by his side as he passes away. In "The Empty Child", after encountering Captain Jack Harkness (John Barrowman) (a con artist and former Time Agent from the 51st century) in 1941, the Doctor realises Jack had caused a deadly nanotechnological plague to sweep through the human race, turning humans into gas-mask zombies. Following the resolution of the situation, Jack prepares to sacrifice himself in "The Doctor Dances", but the Doctor saves him and invites him on board the TARDIS. In "Boom Town", when the Doctor encounters Blon (Annette Badland), the only Slitheen to survive the Downing Street explosion, in present-day Cardiff he has doubts over whether or not to send her home to be executed. During this episode, the Doctor first notices that he and Rose had kept coming across the words "Bad Wolf". In "Bad Wolf", the Doctor, Rose and Jack find themselves at the mercy of the Bad Wolf Corporation based on Satellite Five. However, the true enemy is revealed to be the Daleks, as the Dalek Emperor had also survived the Time War and had rebuilt the Dalek race. In "The Parting of the Ways", the Doctor sends Rose back to the 21st century to protect her before attempting to destroy the Dalek army. When he realises that doing this would destroy most of planet Earth he is unable to do so, proclaiming he would rather be a coward than a killer. Having absorbed the energies of the time vortex, Rose is able to return to the Doctor and destroy the Daleks. To save Rose from being killed by harbouring the time vortex, the Doctor removes the harmful effects by kissing her. However, the damage to his cells causes him to regenerate and the Tenth Doctor (David Tennant) takes his place.

The Ninth Doctor's origins were not explored during Eccleston's tenure in 2005, but were given in the show's 50th anniversary special "The Day of the Doctor" in 2013. This episode also revealed that the Ninth Doctor was actually the Doctor's tenth incarnation; as explained in the short episode "The Night of the Doctor", a companion episode to "The Day of the Doctor", the Eighth Doctor accepted aid from the Sisterhood of Karn after a spaceship crash to ensure that he would regenerate into an incarnation suited to fight in the war. This incarnation (played by John Hurt) would have been the Ninth Doctor, but instead took on the moniker of the War Doctor because his involvement in the war made him feel unworthy of his usual numbered title. In the aftermath of the Time War, the War Doctor succumbs to old age. The regeneration scene is cut short just before a CGI rendition of Eccleston's likeness can be fully seen, as he declined to return for the episode and showrunner Steven Moffat wished to honour his decision. Eccleston does, however, appear in stock footage and stills alongside the first eight Doctors in promotional material for the special.

=== Literature ===
In the essay "Flood Barriers" in the 2007 Panini Books reprint collection of Eighth Doctor comic strips from Doctor Who Magazine strip editor Clayton Hickman reveals that Russell T Davies had authorised the comic strip to depict the Eighth Doctor's regeneration into the Ninth at the end of the story arc, The Flood. The regeneration would have been witnessed by the Eighth Doctor's companion, Destrii, and Hickman writes that the intent was to continue with a Ninth Doctor: Year One story arc with the Ninth Doctor and Destrii. However, when this arc was vetoed by both Russell T Davies and series producer Julie Gardner the creative team felt unable to regenerate the Doctor without Destrii's presence and the decision was made not to depict the regeneration in the comic strip. The reprint collection includes a specially-drawn panel showing how the Ninth Doctor might have looked in the comic strip immediately after his regeneration, wearing the Eighth Doctor's costume and being tended to by Destrii.

The Ninth Doctor appears in the first six of the Doctor Who hardback New Series Adventures novels which tie in with the first series of the revamped show. The first three of these novels— The Clockwise Man, The Monsters Inside and Winner Takes All—were published on 19 May 2005 and feature solely the Doctor and Rose. The Monsters Inside depicts the Doctor taking Rose to her first alien planet, Justicia. Rose mentions the visit to Justicia in the first series episode "Boom Town" which aired 4 June 2005 in an example of the television series referencing the novels. The second batch of Ninth Doctor novels —comprising The Deviant Strain, Only Human and The Stealers of Dreams—were released 8 September 2005 and feature the Doctor, Rose and later companion Captain Jack. All of the Ninth Doctor novels except Only Human make reference to the "Bad Wolf" story arc of the first series although in keeping with the TV series, the Doctor does not acknowledge these as significant.^{[a]} The Ninth Doctor appeared in the Penguin Fiftieth Anniversary eBook novella The Beast of Babylon by Charlie Higson. Here it is shown that he had adventures between dematerialising near the end of "Rose" and re-materializing to tell Rose the TARDIS travels in time.

The character featured in comic strips in Doctor Who Magazine between 2005 and 2006 as well as in several short stories in the Doctor Who Annual 2006. In Steven Moffat's Ninth Doctor short story "'What I Did on My Christmas Holidays' by Sally Sparrow" the Doctor and the TARDIS are inadvertently separated twenty years in time by a fault in the time machine and the Doctor is able to instruct Sally how to bring it back to him in the past. This short story later became the basis of the third series episode "Blink". The Ninth Doctor has appeared in IDW Comics Doctor Who: The Forgotten and Doctor Who: Prisoners of Time.

=== Audio ===
The Ninth Doctor made his first official, original audio story appearance in Big Finish/AudioGo's Destiny of the Doctor: Night of the Whisper, released in September 2013 for 50th anniversary of Doctor Who. He is joined by companions Rose and Captain Jack, and Nicholas Briggs reads the story and provides his voice. Briggs reprised the role for The Ninth Doctor Chronicles, released in May 2017. In 2019, Nicholas Briggs narrated a short trip from the Ninth Doctor era titled Battle Scars.

Released on the 7 October 2021, "The Ashes of Eternity" was an exclusive-to-audio story from BBC Audio in collaboration with Penguin Books featuring the Ninth Doctor and Rose. It was written by Niel Bushnell and read by Adjoa Andoh.

==== The Ninth Doctor Adventures ====
On 9 August 2020, Big Finish announced that Christopher Eccleston would reprise his role as the Ninth Doctor for twelve new stories in The Ninth Doctor Adventures. Eccleston began studio recording for the first box set - Ravagers - on 14th December 2020. The first series, consisting of four volumes, were released between May 2021 and February 2022.

The first three series of The Ninth Doctor Adventures take place prior to the events of Rose and feature the Doctor travelling alone. However, in the first volume, the Doctor encounters a woman called Nova (Camilla Beeput) who fills the companion role for a three-part story. At the end of the second series, the Doctor rescues a young blind man named Callen (Adam Martyn) and his talking guide dog Doyle (Harki Bhambra), taking them away in the TARDIS to find a new home. The pair depart at the start of the third series with the Doctor mentioning several adventures in the interim.

The Ninth Doctor also encounters past companions, including Brigadier Lethbridge-Stewart (Jon Culshaw), Eighth Doctor companions Liv Chenka (Nicola Walker) and Tania Bell (Rebecca Root), and Bernice Summerfield (Lisa Bowerman). In the final volume of series three, Alex Kingston joins the main cast of The Ninth Doctor Adventures, reprising her role as River Song for all three episodes.

With the conclusion of series three in May 2024, Eccleston confirmed that this would be his final performance as the Doctor in the current The Ninth Doctor Adventures range, though he implied he would likely return to the role in the future.

"The Big Finish experience has, to date, been enjoyable and has afforded me the chance to revisit a character I was able to bring to life almost twenty years ago. For now, it is time for me to return to the TARDIS and disappear for a while, but as we know, the world of the Doctor is unpredictable, so this is not a goodbye but an au revoir!"

— Christopher Eccleston

On 15th February 2025, Big Finish announced a fourth series of The Ninth Doctor Adventures with Eccleston returning as the Doctor and reuniting with Billie Piper as Rose Tyler for all twelve episodes. The series began in August 2025 and features Camille Coduri as Jackie Tyler in a recurring role.

==== Once and Future ====
Marking the show's 60th anniversary in 2023, Big Finish released the Once and Future series, in which an unspecified incarnation of the Doctor (later revealed to be the War Doctor) is attacked with a weapon that causes them to switch randomly between past and future incarnations. Eccleston appears in Time Lord Immemorial, where he is joined by David Warner as an alternate-universe version of the Doctor who has appeared in several other Big Finish ranges; Nicola Walker, who reprises her role as Liv Chenka; and Eccleston's Our Friends in the North co-star Gina McKee as The Lumiat - an incarnation of The Master who has renounced evil.

== Development ==
=== Casting ===
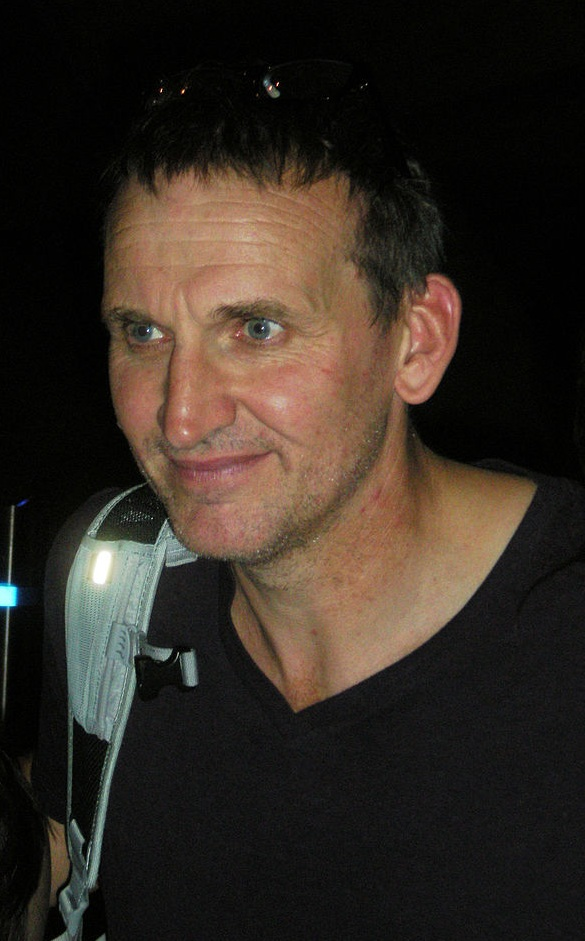
Eccleston in May 2012

The Doctor had been played by eight actors between when the series began in 1963 and the casting of Christopher Eccleston; the concept of regeneration—a process in which the title character takes on a new body and identity—had been introduced in 1966 to allow the production team to change lead actors. Between 1963 and 1989 seven different actors played the part. The Eighth Doctor, played by Paul McGann, appeared in a BBC/Fox co-produced television film in 1996, however this did not lead to a full series. Over six weeks in 2003, the BBC posted an animated serial called Scream of the Shalka on their official website. This was originally developed as an official continuation to series, and featured Richard E. Grant in the role of the Doctor. In promoting the online serial, Grant was referred to as the official Ninth Doctor by the BBC. However, following the September 2003 announcement that the series would return to television with a new actor in the title role, the canonical status of the so-called "Shalka Doctor" was left in doubt.

Christopher Eccleston's casting as the Ninth Doctor was announced on 22 March 2004. He was the production team's first choice for the character. Other actors linked to the role included Bill Nighy, Richard E. Grant, Anthony Head, Eddie Izzard, Hugh Grant and Alan Davies. Jane Tranter, BBC Controller of Drama Commissioning, stated in the announcement of his casting that casting an actor of Eccleston's reputation signalled "our intention to take Doctor Who into the 21st century, as well as retaining its core traditional values – to be surprising, edgy and eccentric". Executive Producer Russell T Davies remarked that casting Eccleston "raises the bar for all of us". Eccleston cited the quality of the scripts as a reason for joining the cast, stating in an interview on BBC's Breakfast programme that he was "excited" about working with Davies. In the press-pack for the series he states that he had emailed the writer to declare his interest in the role. Eccleston enjoyed having the chance to work on a series aimed at a different demographic than his previous work, noting that "it's aimed at families, so I'm kind of acting for children and I feel very lucky to be able to do that". He felt that being cast by Davies in the series was a "risk" because as an actor he is not known for "charm or comedy" and anticipated a potential backlash due to being built up as "an actor of stature" and the difference between his own interpretation of the character and past doctors.

On 30 March 2005 the BBC confirmed that Eccleston would not be staying in the role for a second series, claiming that he was scared of being typecast. On 4 April they admitted that this statement had been made without consulting the actor, and were forced to apologise. Speaking to the Yorkshire Evening Post in 2010, Eccleston denied that he left due to fear of being typecast. He stated that he "didn't enjoy the environment and the culture that we, the cast and crew, had to work in" and that he did not want to do any more based on the experience. He said, "I wasn't comfortable. I thought 'If I stay in this job, I'm going to have to blind myself to certain things that I thought were wrong.' And I think it's more important to be your own man than be successful, so I left. But the most important thing is that I did it, not that I left. I really feel that, because it kind of broke the mould and it helped to reinvent it. I'm very proud of it." According to the Sunday Mirror, an interview for BBC's Doctor Who website that was taken down following his departure revealed that Eccleston had planned to stay for two or three more years. In March 2013 a source for the BBC indicated that Eccleston had discussed plans for Doctor Who's 50th anniversary special, which aired in November 2013, with Davies' successor as executive producer, Steven Moffat. After consideration, he decided not to return to the series. Had he returned, his incarnation would have played the role that ultimately became the War Doctor, portrayed by John Hurt.

=== Characterisation ===
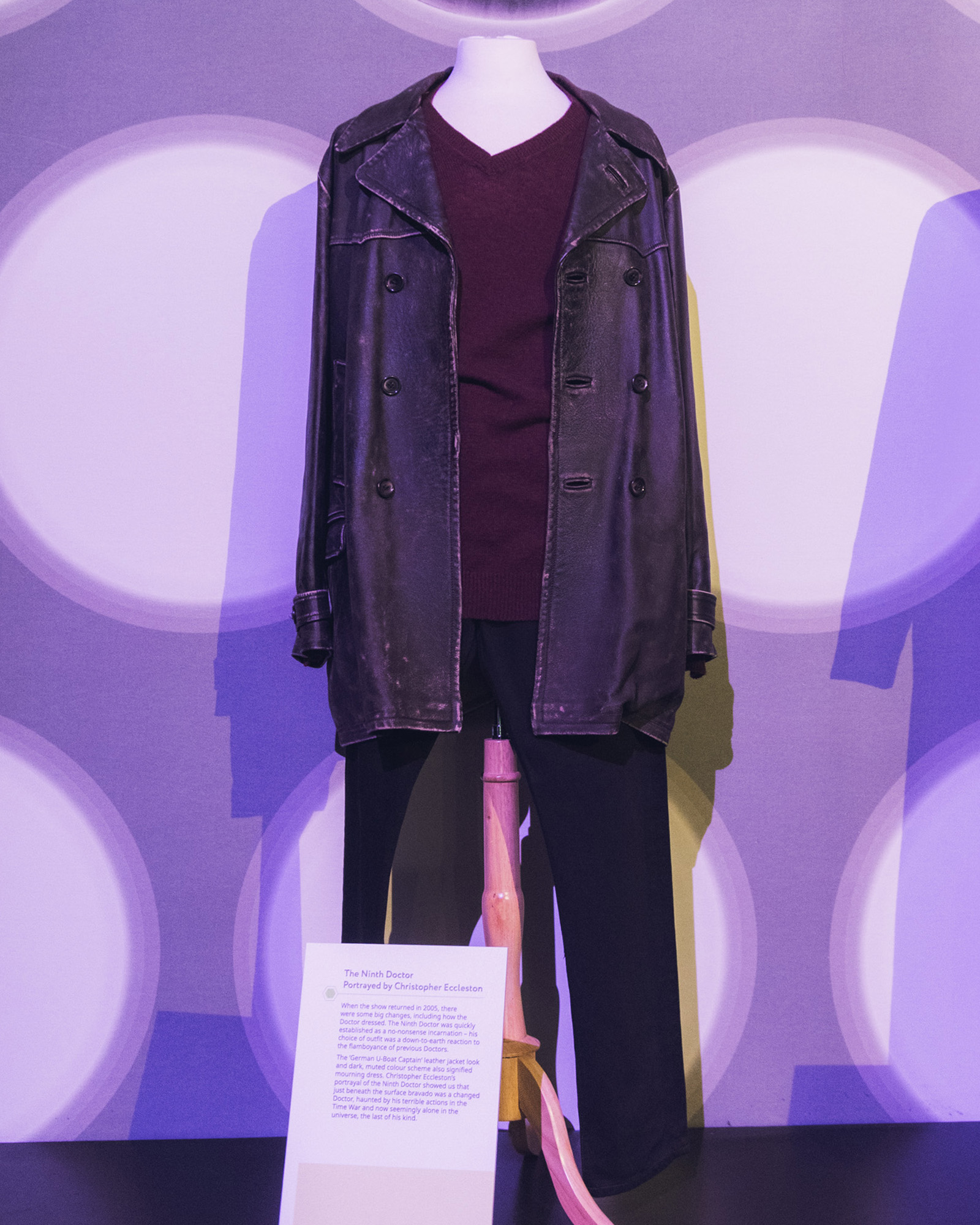
The Ninth Doctor's costume

Eccleston stated in April 2004 that he did not believe his Doctor would be "as eccentric and as foppish as he was in some of his incarnations". Russell T Davies characterised the character as a "stripped down" version of previous Doctors. Regarding the Ninth Doctor's less eccentric character, Davies quipped that "he travels in time and space, he's got two hearts, he's a Time Lord—that's eccentric enough to be getting on with". The Ninth Doctor speaks with a Manchester accent (Eccleston's own) in contrast with previous Doctors, making him the first Doctor to have a Northern accent. This is addressed in "Rose" when Rose Tyler asks the Doctor why he sounds like he is "from the north" if he is really an alien, with the Doctor shooting back that "lots of planets have a north". Remarking on this aspect of his characterisation, Eccleston stated that the character is "a scientist and an intellectual, and a lot of people seem to think you can only be those things if you speak with Received Pronunciation which, of course, is rubbish". The Ninth Doctor's costume consists of a black leather peacoat, a burgundy or navy jumper, dark trousers, and dark shoes. Eccleston said of this, "I didn't want the costume to be my performance, I wanted any flamboyance and colour to come out of my acting."

Eccleston thought that his Doctor should show a "slight dark side" but also bring out a lighter side. Executive producer Julie Gardner observed that the Ninth Doctor could be "very intense but also frivolous". Eccleston felt that his Doctor lives solely for the present, avoids thinking about his painful past, and that his only view of the future is simply that "it's there". He felt that the character ultimately provides a life-affirming message: "In everything the Doctor does, he is saying 'it's great to be alive'." In an interview with Newsround, he stated that the Doctor accepts individuals regardless of colour and creed and expressed hope that the Doctor would encourage young children to appreciate life. However, he also drew out differences between the Doctor and traditional children's heroes, describing the character as "brutal at times [...] confrontational [...] inflexible" and that he "sometimes creates carnage [...] there's nobody like him in Disney". Matthew Sweet of The Evening Standard highlighted the dichotomy of the character being "brave and wise and brilliant" but also "rough and ready" and "down-to-earth".

A loose story arc that informed the Ninth Doctor's characterisation during his tenure is his opinion on the destruction of his own race, the Time Lords, which occurred offscreen before episode one. Eccleston felt that the episode "Dalek" showed the audience why his Doctor is the way he is and "how he feels about his past". Davies remarked that the Ninth Doctor carries a lot of survivor guilt, which is why he "strides through the universe wearing a dark leather peacoat saying 'don't touch me'". Davies felt that the events of the episode "Dalek" provided the Doctor with a "bit of therapy" and that he "starts to rebuild himself" afterwards. In the episode "The Parting of the Ways", the Doctor sacrifices his life to save Rose. Davies felt it was important to take the Doctor away from mythological offstage concepts such as the Time War and provide a conclusion that focused on the relationship between the character and Rose. John Barrowman, who played Captain Jack, felt that the Doctor's decision to save Rose enabled a catharsis; as he sacrifices himself to save her, he lets go of the burden of the Time Lords being destroyed.

=== Companions ===
They love each other. They're best friends and they kind of finish off each other's sentences, understand each other's mood swings and reasoning but, as in all good relationships, they have lessons to teach each other.

— Eccleston on the relationship between the Doctor and Rose

Since 1963, the Doctor has travelled with various companions who generally serve to remind him of his "moral duty". The casting of Billie Piper as the Ninth Doctor's primary female companion Rose Tyler was announced in May 2004. Julie Gardner felt that the young actress and former pop star was perfect as a "unique" and "dynamic" companion for the Doctor. Press for the series focused heavily on the fact that Rose was to be more independent and courageous than previous companions. Prior to the casting of Piper, Eccleston had joked that "I'll be doing the running around screaming." He later opined that Rose is not as "vulnerable" as previous companions and that "she's as brave and courageous and intelligent as he is" citing the fact that she saves the Doctor's life. Piper remarked that the Doctor challenges Rose more than anyone else in her life and that he in turn sees in her "she has huge potential, to be someone really, really great." Eccleston felt that Rose is a "heroine" who "teaches [the Doctor] huge emotional lessons". He felt that the relationship between the two characters was "love at first sight" although in a more mysterious fashion than a conventional love affair. Commentators on the series noted the romantic tension between the two characters. In their book Who is the Doctor?, Graeme Burk and Robert Smith described the climactic kiss between the Ninth Doctor and Rose in "The Parting of the Ways" as being something "we all secretly wanted, even though it ultimately killed him".

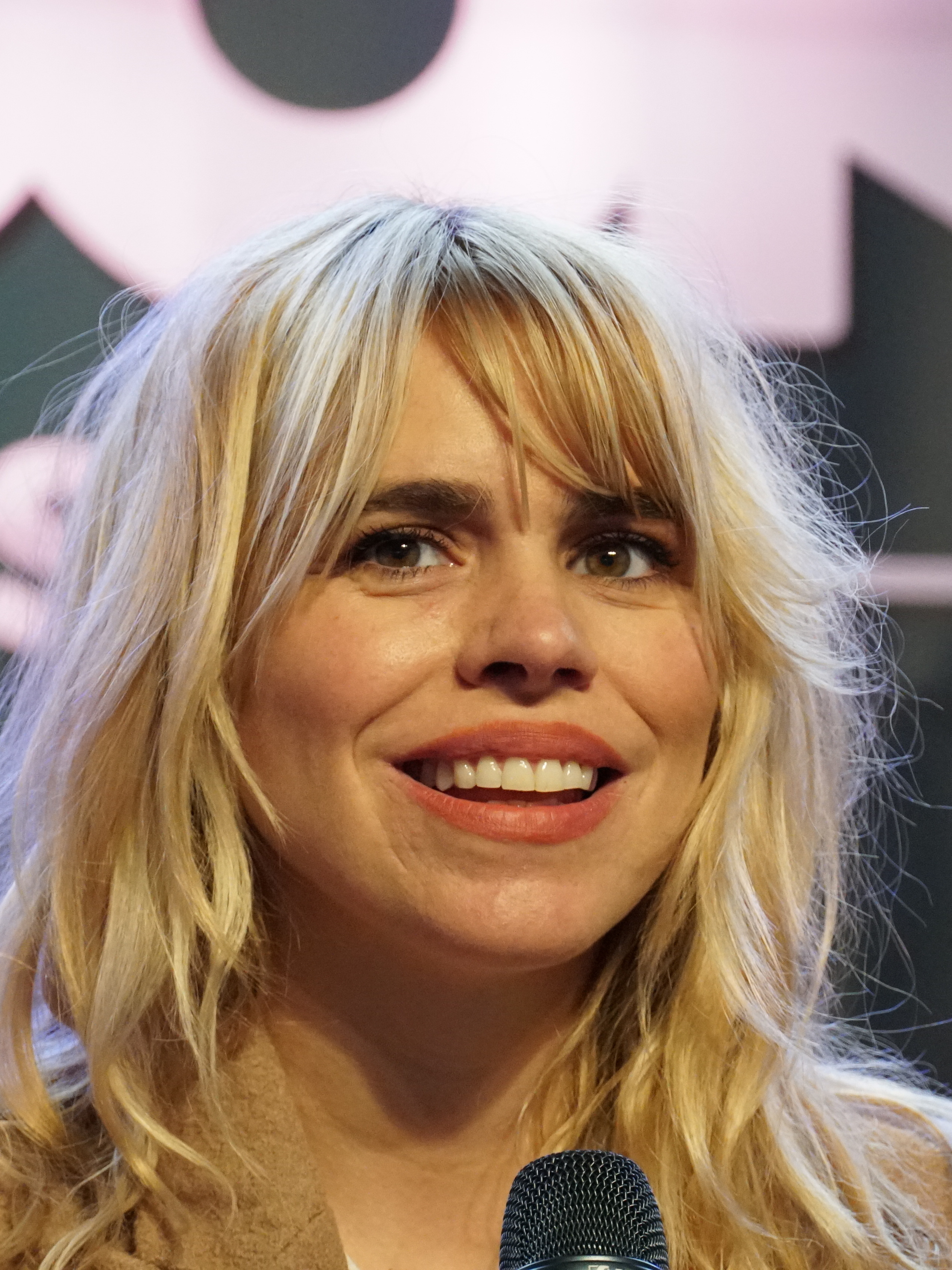
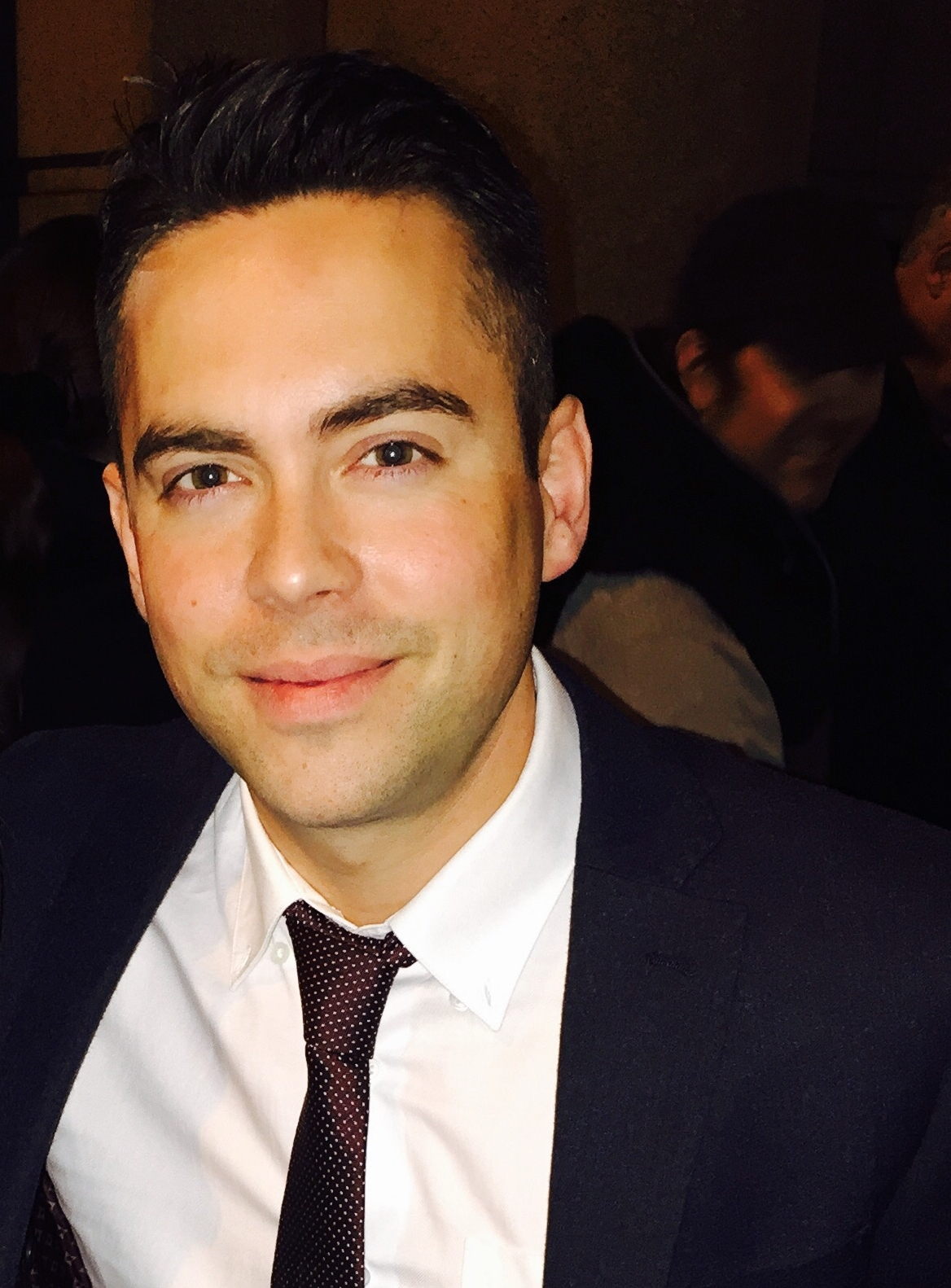
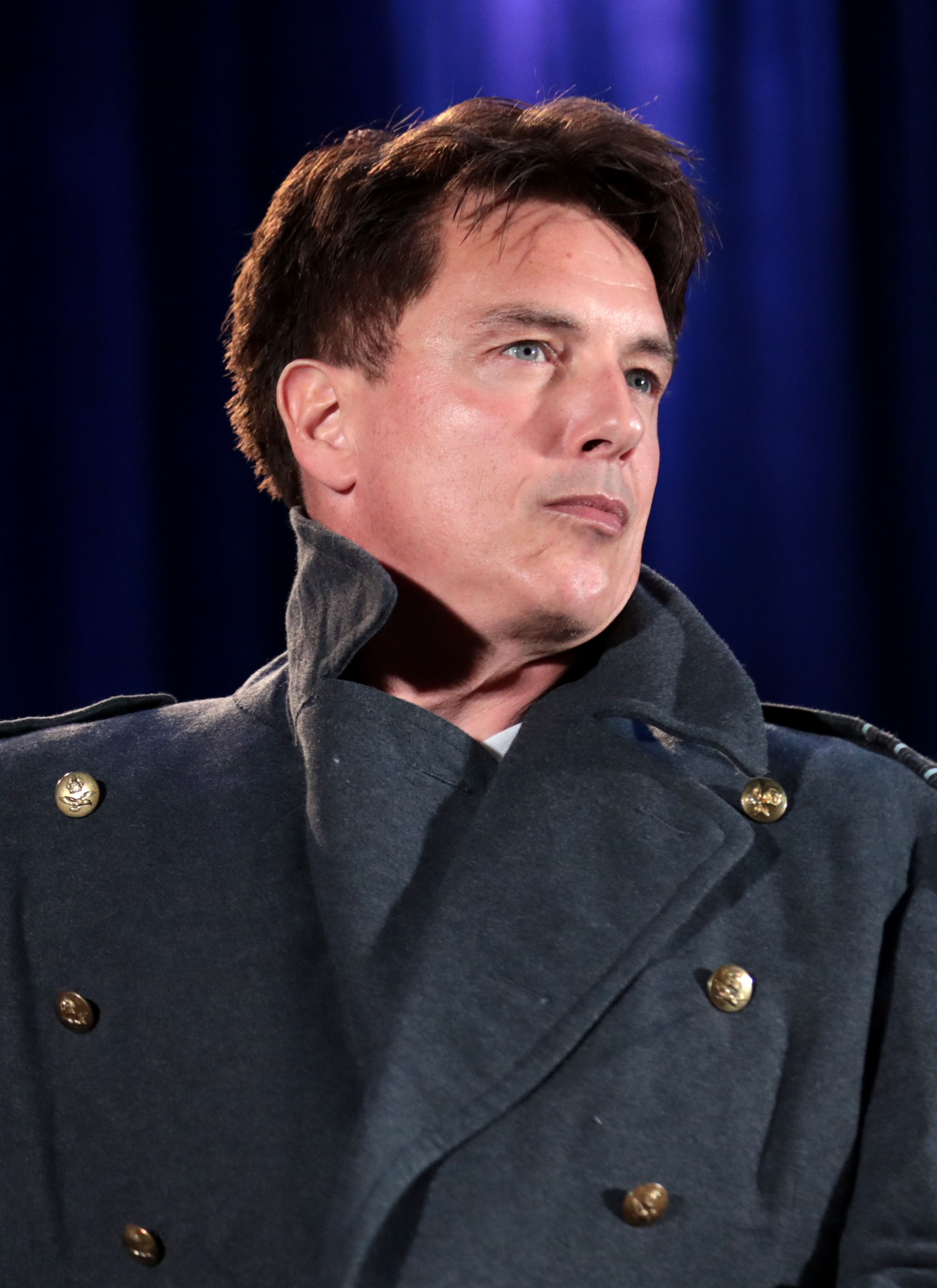
(From left to right) Billie Piper, Bruno Langley, and John Barrowman portrayed the Ninth Doctor's Companions Rose Tyler, Adam Mitchell, and Captain Jack Harkness respectively.

Adam Mitchell joins the Doctor and Rose in the episode "Dalek". The character was first conceived during Russell T Davies' 2003 pitch to the BBC: it was always the intention for Adam to join the TARDIS team after Rose developed a liking for him. Contrasting against Rose, Adam was created to show that not everybody is suited to be a companion. Davies stated that he "always wanted to do a show with someone who was a rubbish companion" and dubbed Adam "the companion that couldn't". Upon returning Adam home, the Doctor informs him that "I only take the best. I've got Rose". Fraser McAlpine, reviewing Adam's appearances as companion for BBC America's Anglophenia blog, described Adam as fulfilling a role as "the companion that proves the worth of all of the other companions". From episodes nine through thirteen, Rose and the Doctor are joined by the con man Jack Harkness. Jack's appearances were conceived with the intention of forming a character arc in which Jack is transformed from a coward to a hero. John Barrowman, reflecting on the interrelationships between The Doctor, Jack and Rose, felt that "the subtle sexual chemistry between all three characters... was always in play" with the caveat that "the relationships were by no means driven by desire". SFX magazine also commented on the "intoxicatingly flirtatious dynamic" and compared the trio to "a Buffy-style Scooby gang who can quip in the face of danger". Jack parts from the Ninth Doctor with a kiss which Barrowman felt to be "full of fondess and respect" and both "a significant moment in the annals of the series" and "a moment full of melancholy and loss for the characters".

== Analysis and reception ==
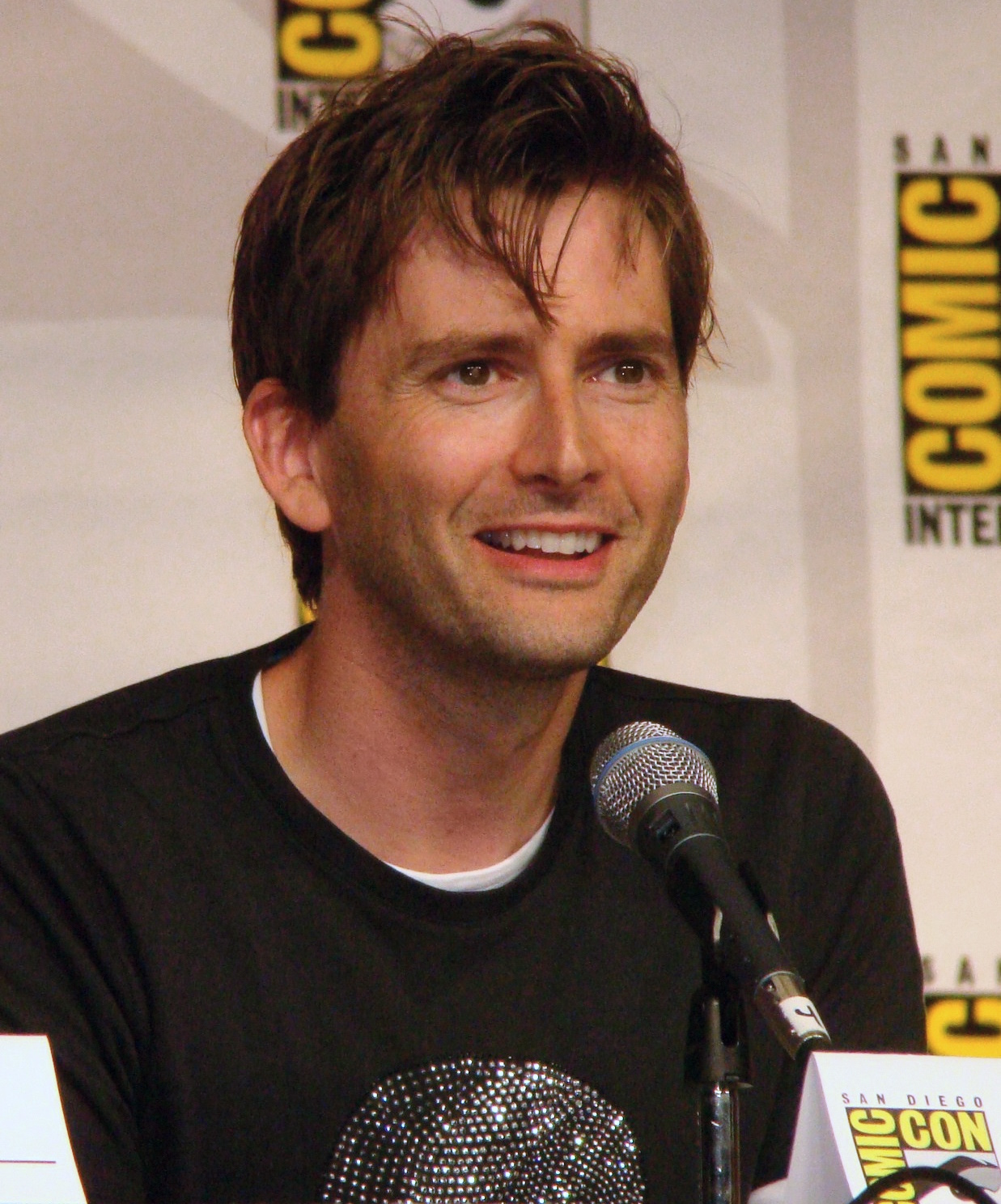
Eccleston's successor, David Tennant, felt that he had "an awful lot to live up to".

The Ninth Doctor is highly regarded among fans of the show and both mainstream press and science fiction reviewers generally credit Eccleston and his Doctor as helping to re-establish the show following its hiatus between 1996 and 2005. The character's interactions with his arch-enemies, the Daleks, were particularly praised. Eccleston won several awards for his single series, including the 2005 National Television Award for Best Actor. James Delingpole of The Spectator noted that subsequent to Fourth Doctor Tom Baker's departure and prior to Eccleston, actors who portrayed the Doctor had a tendency to play the role "too camp, knowing, lovable or twee". He felt that the "brusque, sarky and virile" Ninth Doctor "transports us back to the golden era of Jon Pertwee when the series still had that edge of darkness." Marena Manzoufas, head of ABC programming, commented after picking up the series that Eccleston "has brought a new dynamic energy to the role" and the show would appeal to both long time viewers and new fans. She cited the high viewing figures of Eccleston's debut episode—over 10 million—as proof that audiences were ready to welcome in a new era of the show. Looking back on David Tennant's era and forward to Matt Smith, The Herald's Edd McCracken comments that casting Tennant had been a risk after "the show's reputation and ratings" had been "restored under Eccleston". However he notes that due to the brevity of the Ninth Doctor's era Tennant subsequently had time to make his character more established. Richard Henley Davis of The Economic Voice also notes that Tennant "had big boots to fill after Christopher Eccleston's Doctor Who, which many believe to be the greatest incarnation of the lunatic time lord." In a 2005 interview Tennant himself stated "there's an awful lot to live up to" after taking on the role from Eccleston, having admired his performances as a viewer.

Like Delingpole, Andrew Blair found similarities between the Ninth Doctor era and the Third Doctor era, summarising Eccleston's single series as "a modern day season seven". In his retrospective of the character, he states that Eccleston's casting proved that the revival of the show "was not a light entertainment concern". He comments that in online fandom there was a sense "of a ship being steered in a different direction" and praises the plot device of the Time War as allowing the character to become mysterious again by providing him a "blank slate". He compares the Ninth Doctor to the First Doctor (William Hartnell) in that both characters are "an unknown who remains aggressively weird until his new-found human friends soften him up". Blair also felt that the Ninth Doctor's relationship with the Doctor's arch enemies the Daleks was more successful than in other incarnations giving particular praise to Eccleston's "spittle-enhanced and terrifyingly furious reaction" to the monsters in "Dalek". Blair ends his retrospective by noting that without the foundations laid by Eccleston the show "wouldn't have been able to move onwards towards the even more popular David Tennant era". Steven Moffat, who wrote "The Empty Child"/"The Doctor Dances" for Eccleston's Doctor and would become Doctor Who executive producer in 2010, observed that in 2005 there was a distinct lack of science fiction and fantasy drama in the UK. He felt that the first series had to establish itself as "a bit Hollyoaks" and "a bit tough detective" to prove itself as a "proper, sensible drama series". Moffat notes that the 2005 series "changed the landscape into which it once tried to fit" and that now Doctor Who "has to be the most fantastical of the fantasy shows."

Ahead of the series premiere on Australian Network ABC the Sydney Morning Herald's Robin Oliver predicted that older viewers "will find Eccleston easily the best time lord since Tom Baker." However Harry Venning of The Stage, whilst enthusiastic about the revival of the show, labelled Eccleston as the "show's biggest disappointment" following the premiere episode, stating he looked uncomfortable in a fantasy role. The Guardian's Stephen Kelly felt that Eccleston's Ninth Doctor had many faults, two of which he felt to be "looking like an EastEnders extra and bellowing "fantastic" at every opportunity". However, he felt that he "brought warmth, wit and promise" and a "formidable presence". Kelly believed that Eccleston was believable as a man who had destroyed two civilisations and was dealing with the repercussions and could have brought more to the show had Eccleston stayed for a second series. Seventh Doctor actor Sylvester McCoy praised Eccleston as being "quite alien" as the Doctor and that "we were not sure if he was on the edge of insanity or not, which was rather good." Peter Davison, who played the Fifth Doctor, criticised Eccleston's decision to quit after a single series, stating "I don't think you can engage with the new Doctor in the way you should be able to."

In 2005 Christopher Eccleston won "Most Popular Actor" at the National Television Awards and the TV Quick and TV Choice award for Best Actor. He was also voted Best Actor by readers of SFX magazine. Eccleston was named Best Actor with 59.42% of the vote in BBC.co.uk's online "Best of Drama" poll in 2005. In a Doctor Who Magazine poll in 2006 Eccleston was voted the third greatest Doctor behind those portrayed by Tom Baker and David Tennant. In April 2011 IGN also listed Eccleston's Doctor as the third best Doctor, opining that he "gave us a tough-as-nails Doctor damaged by war and guilt, but still possessing the same spark of fun and adventure as his previous selves." The entertainment website stated that in introducing a new generation to the show he "became an icon for a new millennium." Gavin Fuller of The Daily Telegraph named him the ninth best Doctor, noting that Eccleston was "a serious actor" and "his attempts at a lighter style could seem a tad forced", though this was "offset by his showdowns against the Daleks". Fuller also was disappointed that his "time was over all too swiftly". A 2012 poll conducted by the United States media news magazine Entertainment Weekly resulted in Eccleston being voted the fourth most popular Doctor, behind David Tennant, Matt Smith (the Eleventh Doctor) and Tom Baker.

== See also ==
- Shalka Doctor

== Notes ==
- ^aThe Clockwise Man: page 120, The Monsters Inside: page 136, Winner Takes All: page 22, The Deviant Strain: page 162, The Stealers of Dreams: page 113
