= Eirlys Bellin =

British actor and comedian

- Occupations: Actress, character comedian, voice-over artist

Eirlys Bellin is a Welsh actress, character comedian and voice-over artist from Cowbridge in South Wales.

Bellin trained at the University of Edinburgh and the Mountview Academy of Theatre Arts. She has been a regular on the London circuit starring in character comedy shows like Spank! And Something for the Weekend. In her hit debut solo show Eirlys Bellin: Reality Check, she performed as Welsh celebrity wannabe Rhian Davies at Holyrood, Edinburgh, Edinburgh in 2007, which spawned many reviews in her favour. Her 2010 Edinburgh Show Unaccustomed As I Am was directed by Logan Murray.

Bellin was also a semi-finalist in Funny Women Awards at the Manchester Comedy Festival.

== Television roles ==
Television
Year	Title	Role	Notes
2000	The Magic Paintbrush: A Story from China	Girl	Voice
2005	Doctor Who	Bev	Episode: Father's Day
2008	High Hopes	Ffion	Episode: Saturday Night and Sunday Morning
?	Herio’r Ddraig		
?	Pobol y Cwm		
?	A470		
?	Teledu Eddie		
2014	Stella	Reporter	'Christmas Special'

== Other appearances ==
- Stardust (BBC Radio 4)
- Hole (BBC Radio 4)
- Pips (BBC Radio 4)
- A Traveller in Time (BBC Radio 4)
- Tower (BBC Radio 4)
- Truth or Dare (BBC Radio Wales)
- Bob the Builder (S4C)
- Sabrina, the Animated Series (S4C)

In 2008, she featured in A Complete History of My Sexual Failures (Chris Waitt, Warp X), and also directed children's animation series Raymond (VSI for TV Toonland).
