= Adam Mitchell (Doctor Who) =

Fictional character from Doctor Who

- Doctor Who character
- First appearance: "Dalek" (2005)
- Last appearance: "The Long Game" (2005)
- Portrayed by: Bruno Langley

In-universe information
- Affiliation: Ninth Doctor
- Home era: Early 21st Century

Adam Mitchell is a fictional character in the British science fiction television series Doctor Who, played by Bruno Langley. Adam is introduced in the first series of the programme's revival as the second television companion of the Ninth Doctor (Christopher Eccleston). However, unlike the Ninth Doctor's primary companion, Rose Tyler (Billie Piper), who provided an effective human contrast to the Doctor's centuries-old alien, Adam was created to provide an example of an inept time traveller.

The character is introduced as a boy genius from the year 2012 who attracts the attention of the Doctor's traveling companion Rose after she and the Doctor meet him in his place of work. Despite Rose's willingness to accept Adam as a fellow traveller, the Doctor is sceptical. After Adam attempts to use information from the future for his own gain, the Doctor throws Adam out of the TARDIS and sends him home. This was the first example of the Doctor forcing a companion to leave because of negative behaviour.

Adam was created during executive producer Russell T Davies's original pitch to the BBC as part of his plans to revive Doctor Who for the channel. Though established early in the series' planning, Adam was always intended to be a short-term character. Though reviewers generally reacted negatively to the character, Adam's role as a foil to the stock companion figure has been praised alongside the moral lessons of his departure.

== Appearances ==
Adam first appears in the first series episode "Dalek" as a young researcher under the employ of Henry van Statten (Corey Johnson), who is the owner of a museum of extraterrestrial artefacts in an underground bunker in Utah. Adam mentions that he is a genius, having successfully hacked into the United States Department of Defense computers when he was eight years old. He quickly forms a mutual attraction with Rose and informs her of his desire to see the stars. When a live Dalek manages to break free and slaughter its way through the base, Adam finds himself fleeing along with Rose. At the end of the episode, when van Statten's museum is closed down, Rose asks the Doctor to take Adam along with them in the TARDIS. The Doctor is reluctant, but Rose convinces him to let Adam travel with them in the TARDIS.

In the following episode, "The Long Game", the Doctor, Rose, and Adam arrive on a space station in the year 200,000, and Adam is overwhelmed by culture shock. Tempted by the wealth of information and technology available to him, he has an advanced computer interface port, activated by a click of the fingers, installed in his head that allows him to access the future's computer system. He attempts to transmit information back to 21st-century Earth using Rose's modified mobile phone to leave the data on his parents' answering machine. This backfires when the villains running the station attempt to extract information on the Doctor directly from Adam's brain via his new interface port. As punishment for Adam's breach of trust, the Doctor returns him home and destroys his answering machine and the data transmitted to it. When Adam's mother (Judy Holt) returns home, she reacts with shock and horror after inadvertently activating the implant installed in his forehead.

In the 2013 comic book series Prisoners of Time, released to celebrate the 50th anniversary, Adam is the main antagonist. After his mother dies he acquires a Vortex Manipulator and plans to kidnap the Doctor's companions for revenge due to the Doctor preventing him from acquiring technology that could have saved her, tracking down all eleven Doctors and abducting their companions at various points in their lives. At the end of the story, Adam is revealed to have allied himself with a past version of the Master as the two confront the Eleventh Doctor, Adam offering to spare one companion of the Doctor's choice while killing the others. However, the Doctor turns the tables on Adam by summoning his past selves to aid him, as well as arranging for Frobisher to be captured while posing as Peri, allowing him to escape captivity and sabotage Adam's equipment to release the rest of the companions. When the Master reveals his true goal of channeling chronal energy through the TARDIS to destroy the universe, Adam is given a unique chance at redemption as he sacrifices himself to destroy the Master's equipment. In his last moments, he is reconciled with the Ninth, Tenth and Eleventh Doctors, and Rose, and acknowledged as a "companion true" on his gravestone, receiving posthumous validation by the eleven Doctors and his fellow companions.

Mitchell appears in The Ninth Doctor Chronicles which was released in May 2017.

== Conceptual history ==
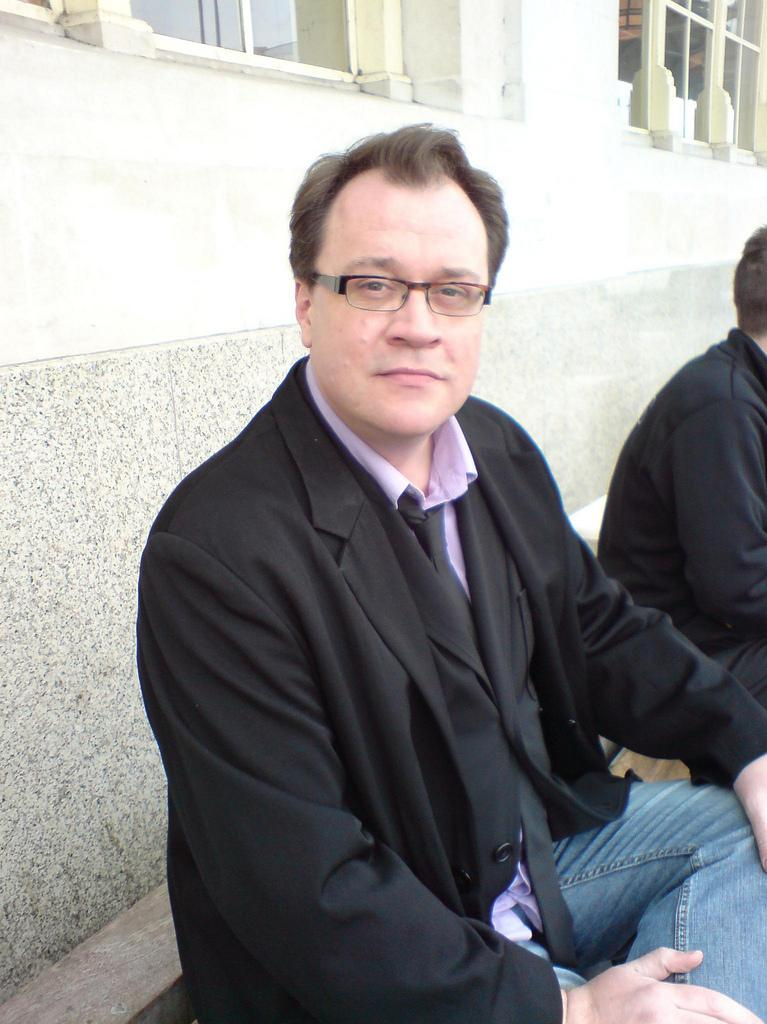
Executive producer Russell T Davies (pictured) created Adam specifically to be an inept companion.

The character of Adam Mitchell was first conceived, along with Henry van Statten, during Russell T Davies's 2003 pitch to the BBC, in a story heavily based on Robert Shearman's audio play Jubilee, which would later form the base for the episode "Dalek". It was always the intention of the production team for Adam to join the TARDIS after Rose developed a liking for him. To play this role Langley was chosen, mostly because of his role on Coronation Street as Todd Grimshaw. He had auditioned for the role on the same day as doing publicity for his leaving storyline in Coronation Street. Reacting to his casting, Langley remarked that "I couldn't have asked for a better next role because Doctor Who is another great institution." Langley describes Adam as "a bit nerdy" and states of his character's attraction to Rose that "she's a very pretty girl and Adam hasn't seen any girls for a long time."

Since 1963, the perennial companion figure in Doctor Who generally serves to remind the Doctor of his "moral duty". However, Adam was never meant to be a long-term companion. In the behind-the-scenes book Doctor Who: The Inside Story Davies explains that he "always wanted to do a show with someone who was a rubbish companion" and dubs Adam "the companion that couldn't". In an episode of Doctor Who Confidential he characterised Adam as "a little bit ambitious" and "a little bit too clever for his own good." Langley added that the character ends up "on the wrong side of the tracks" because he likes "meddling with things" and that "him thinking he's a genius gets him into bother". Explaining Adam's downfall, Davies states that he "doesn't realize he's out for his own good until he's put in a situation of temptation, where knowledge, information and power are put in front of him." Davies felt that Adam's story provided "a chance to see someone starting on that path" before the Doctor cuts his ambitions short.

Originally, there were several aspects of the character that were cut before appearing on screen: in early drafts, he was the son of Henry van Statten. In the DVD commentary for "The Long Game" director Brian Grant and actor Bruno Langley discuss Adam's scripted motive of bringing future medical knowledge back home to cure his father, who was suffering from ill health, though this motive did not remain in the final episode. To promote the character during the week "The Long Game" was first broadcast, the in-universe tie-in website "Who is Doctor Who?" announced that "14 year-old Adam Mitchell from Nottingham" had won a competition arranged by van Statten the previous week. Adam's winning essay on "Why I Want To Meet An Alien" mentions a desire to acquire advanced knowledge from them with the explanation "I don't think it's cheating, really. It's just a shortcut".

== Reception ==
Dek Hogan of Digital Spy reacted negatively to Adam's introduction in "Dalek", stating that he "didn't really see the point of Todd Grimshaw out of Corrie popping up". He suggested it would have been more entertaining had the episode featured Langley's screen mother from Coronation Street instead. Ian Hyland of the Sunday Mirror also disliked Adam's introduction, describing "the introduction of a puppy-love sequence between Rose and a cute English boy" as "very, very irritating". SFX Magazine commented on the similarity between Adam's introduction to the future and that of Rose in "The End of the World", stating "it was clearly a deliberate parallel on Russell's part, as part of his scheme to contrast and compare the reactions of Rose and Adam". Their website reviewer observed that Adam's "comedy faint" marked him out as an unsuitable traveller. Marc Edward DiPaulo of the University of Oklahoma notes that Adam's role in "The Long Game" is to provide satire on the media and to function as "a condemnation of those who cannot stop immersing themselves in television, the Internet, iPods, and other nonstop broadcasters of what the Doctor calls 'useless information.'" Fraser McAlpine, reviewing Adam's appearances as companion for BBC America's Anglophenia blog, describes him as a "craven meddler" and a "social climber". By virtue of his failures, Adam becomes "the companion that proves the worth of all of the other companions".

"Adam was always designed as a 'Companion who couldn't', and although he's not the most memorable character, the pay-off to his sheer ineptitude is more than worthy of mention."

— Den of Geek on the character of Adam.

In their book Who is the Doctor?, Graeme Burk and Robert Smith described Adam in "Dalek" as "somewhat annoying". Burk referred to him in "The Long Game" as "arrogant and narcissistic", which made Rose appear shallow for insisting he travel with them, but felt that Langley did "a superb job" conveying the character's flaws. He stated that it was "a shame" that the backstory of Adam's motivation was cut from the script, as it would have made his character more believable. The two found a logical flaw in the Doctor's decision to drop Adam off, as it was a possibility that someone could get their hands on the future technology. Radio Times reviewer Patrick Mulkern gave a positive overview of Adam, describing the character as "bumptious yet likeable" and his departure as "literary precision". He commented that Adam "adds an interesting dynamic, subtly different" from Mickey Smith and Captain Jack Harkness, who also worked with Rose and the Ninth Doctor. Instead of threatening the Doctor and Rose's relationship, Adam "serves to strengthen it". In 2010, Mark Harrison of Den of Geek listed the character's exit from the TARDIS as the tenth greatest companion farewell scene stating that it was "great to get a glimpse of the Doctor outright booting someone out." He felt that the character "struck out in spectacular fashion" by attempting to steal future technology and that his eventual fate was an example of poetic justice. Charlie Jane Anders also praised the concept of Adam's story arc, positioning his departure as the seventh most depressing exit for a companion in Doctor Who's history. She felt that to have "a companion who flunks out" was one of Davies's "cleverest ideas" as executive producer of the series and that Adam's human flaws made him relatable. In 2010 readers of the Radio Times voted Adam the 45th most popular companion, out of forty-eight viable options.
