= Father's Day (Doctor Who) =

163 – "Father's Day"
- Doctor Who episode

Cast
- Doctor: Christopher Eccleston – Ninth Doctor
- Companion: Billie Piper – Rose Tyler
- Others: Camille Coduri – Jackie Tyler; Shaun Dingwall – Pete Tyler; Robert Barton – Registrar; Julia Joyce – Young Rose; Christopher Llewellyn – Stuart; Frank Rozelaar-Green – Sonny; Natalie Jones – Sarah; Eirlys Bellin – Bev; Rhian James – Suzie; Casey Dyer – Young Mickey

Production
- Directed by: Joe Ahearne
- Written by: Paul Cornell
- Produced by: Phil Collinson
- Executive producers: Russell T Davies; Julie Gardner; Mal Young
- Music by: Murray Gold
- Production code: 1.8
- Series: Series 1
- Running time: 45 minutes
- First broadcast: 14 May 2005

Chronology
← Preceded by "The Long Game"	Followed by → "The Empty Child"

"Father's Day" is the eighth episode of the first series of the British science fiction television programme Doctor Who, first broadcast on 14 May 2005 on BBC One. It was written by Paul Cornell and directed by Joe Ahearne.

In this episode, alien time traveller the Doctor (Christopher Eccleston) agrees to take his companion Rose Tyler (Billie Piper) back to the day her father Pete (Shaun Dingwall) died in 1987. When Rose intervenes and pulls her father out of the path of a car, time is wounded and dangerous Reapers attack, threatening to erase history. Pete eventually realises that to get rid of the Reapers, he must throw himself under the car that was originally meant to kill him.

Lead writer and executive producer Russell T Davies conceived "Father's Day" as an emotionally driven time travel story to explore Rose's character. He chose Cornell to write the episode; Cornell had written spin-off material during the years the programme was on hiatus. The monster element of the story was expanded based on suggestions from Cornell and BBC Head of Drama Jane Tranter, and the Reapers went through many designs. The episode was filmed in November 2004 at St Paul's Church and streets in Cardiff. "Father's Day" was watched by 8.06 million viewers in the United Kingdom and received generally positive reviews. Critics praised the focus on character and emotion. It was one of three Doctor Who episodes that year to be nominated for the 2006 Hugo Award for Best Dramatic Presentation, Short Form.

== Plot ==
The Ninth Doctor takes Rose to the day her father Pete died so that he is not alone when he dies. Upon their arrival in London in 1987, they witness the accident, but Rose is unable to go to comfort Pete. Going back to try again, Rose suddenly runs out and pushes Pete aside, saving his life.

The younger versions of the Doctor and Rose vanish. The Doctor and Rose argue about her actions, with the Doctor rebuking Rose for potentially damaging the timeline. Rose decides to go with Pete to his friend's wedding, while the Doctor returns to the TARDIS only to find that it is now an empty shell. Strange flying beasts called Reapers (Note: The name Reaper does not appear on screen or in the credits list. It comes from the episode's script.) appear and begin consuming people.

Rose and Pete drive to the wedding together, and the car that was meant to kill Pete appears and nearly collides with their car. A Reaper attacks the wedding guests, including Rose's mother Jackie and an infant Rose. The Doctor runs to the church and directs everyone inside, noting that the age of the church will protect them against the Reapers. The Doctor explains to Rose that "time has been damaged," and the Reapers have come to "sterilise the wound". Feeling that his TARDIS key is still warm, the Doctor sets it up in the middle of the church and the TARDIS slowly begins materialising around it.

Pete realises that Rose is his and Jackie's daughter, and when Rose is unable to answer questions about how good a father he was, Pete realises he was meant to die. Jackie thinks Rose is Pete's daughter with another woman. Pete hands the baby Rose to adult Rose in a fit of frustration, creating a paradox, and a Reaper enters the church. The Doctor, declaring that he is the oldest thing in the church, offers himself to the Reaper, which consumes him and disappears. The TARDIS key goes cold and drops to the ground.

Realising that he must die to restore the timeline, Pete runs in front of the car that was originally meant to kill him; it had continued to appear and disappear on the road just outside the church. Pete is hit by the car and fatally injured, repairing the timeline, and the Reapers' victims including the Doctor reappear. The Doctor sends Rose to be with Pete, and she holds his hand until he dies.

=== Outside references ===
"The Lamb and Flag", a pub from the sitcom Bottom, is referenced in the episode. It also features the 2002 song "Don't Mug Yourself" by The Streets, indicating the damage to the timeline. Rose believes Pete to be "a bit of a Del Boy", referring to the character from 1980s comedy Only Fools and Horses. The 1987 song "Never Gonna Give You Up" by Rick Astley and the 1987 Communards cover of the 1971 song "Never Can Say Goodbye" also feature in the episode.

== Production ==
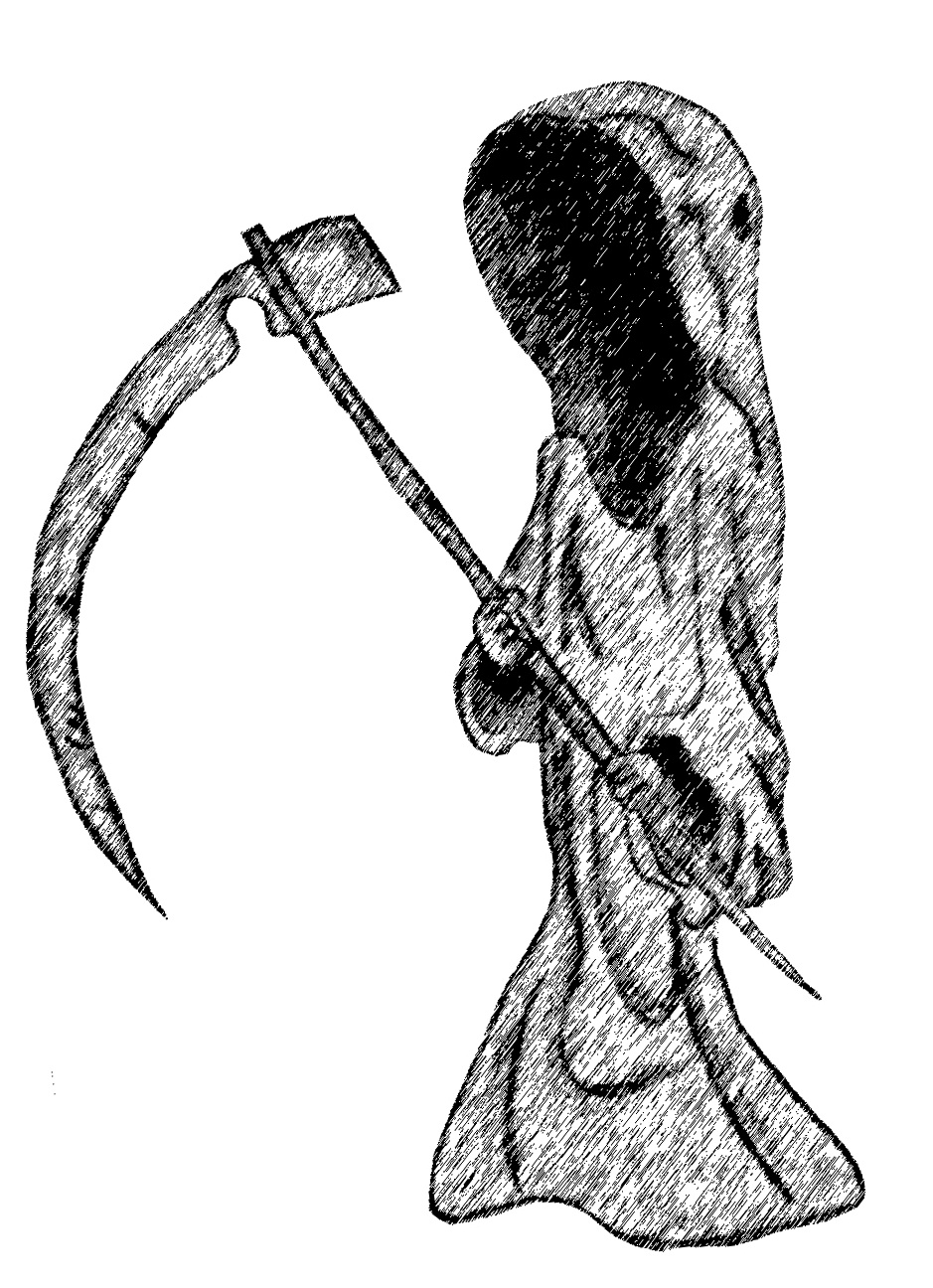
The Reapers initially looked more like the Grim Reaper. (Pictured: an artist's representation of the Grim Reaper.)

According to producer Phil Collinson, showrunner Russell T Davies came up with the concept for "Father's Day" at an early stage in the planning of the series, as it was a "perfect time travel story". Davies wanted the storyline to be easy to follow and drawn from human emotions. Additionally, the previous seven episodes had established why Rose was a good companion, and so "Father's Day" shows that she does make mistakes, but in a relatable way. Davies chose Paul Cornell to write the episode; Cornell had written Doctor Who spin-off material, especially in novels for the Virgin New Adventures, which bridged the gap between the classic series and the new. Davies originally intended that the episode be a small budget-saver character piece investigating the death of Rose's father, but Cornell suggested the addition of the Reapers and BBC Head of Drama Jane Tranter encouraged the additions of monsters to the new series. Working titles for the episode included "Wounded Time" and "Wound in Time".

Davies and Cornell debated whether it should have been Rose's plan all along to save her father; this is left ambiguous in the episode. Billie Piper felt that it did not occur to Rose until after she began travelling. In the original script, in the scene where the Doctor opens the TARDIS doors and discovers only a police box interior, the police box fell apart. This was changed for reasons of cost, and Cornell has stated that he thinks the change is an improvement. Cornell also states that the character of Pete Tyler is based on his own father, who attempted many different jobs and schemes (including, like Pete, selling health drinks) before eventually finding success running a betting shop. Pete's line "I'm your dad, it's my job for it to be my fault" is taken from something Cornell's father once said to him. Originally Pete was to take a swig of wine before sacrificing himself, but this was removed because a correlation between alcohol and bravery was not thought to be a positive message. Simon Pegg, who ultimately played the Editor in earlier series one episode "The Long Game", was reported as being in line to play Pete, before having to pass on the episode. Shaun Dingwall would ultimately take up the role of Pete. Another version of Pete that hails from an alternate universe would appear in the following 2006 series of the show in the episodes "Rise of the Cybermen", "The Age of Steel", and "Doomsday". Dingwall returned to portray the character in these appearances.

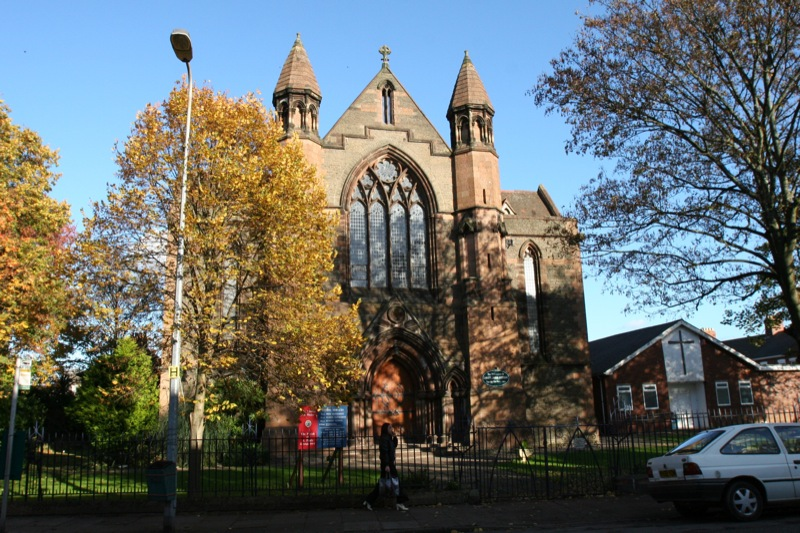
St. Paul's Church in Grangetown.

The entire episode was shot in Cardiff, in November 2004. After Eccleston's father fell ill, a version of the script was drafted where the Doctor was physically absent from the episode's action. However, Eccleston was ultimately able to appear more substantially. The weather changed frequently during filming, and the cast began to fall ill; Eccleston had a cold. The production team selected several streets that looked similar. Most of the streets were in the community of Grangetown. The streets did not require much work for them to resemble 1980s streets; only a few satellite dishes were taken down. The church is St Paul's Church, also in Grangetown. The set of the Tylers' Apartment redressed for the time period. For the 1980s style, members of the cast and crew brought in photographs of themselves from the 80s; for example, peach dresses and "big hair" were incorporated, but these elements were not meant to be distracting. Camille Coduri, who played Jackie, wore a wig for this episode. Some of the conversation between Rose and her father in the car was cut because the car had made the dialogue delivery too "bouncy". Piper was scared of holding the baby. Because the baby is present throughout the majority of the episode, but the number of hours they could work with the infant was limited, an "artificial baby" was used as a placeholder in some scenes.

The Reapers went through many designs. Originally, they were supposed to be "men in cowls" based on the Grim Reaper; the final design retains some of this image with its "scythe-like tail". The original design was deemed too similar to creatures seen in "The End of the World", and so were reworked into something more "otherworldly". They were not originally intended to fly. There was also discussion of how much they should resemble animals as opposed to the Grim Reaper; the end result is a mixture of the two approaches. The final design had a "shark quality", bat wings, and a mouth influenced by the praying mantis. Vulture sound effects were used for its screech. The model was made over two months, being finished at the end of February 2005 rather than at the beginning of January as scheduled. The special effects team then had two or three weeks to complete the "40-odd shots" of the completely CGI Reapers in the episode. The episode ended up being more expensive than intended because of the CGI.

When time is damaged, one of the effects is that Cellphones all begin to repeat the message, "Watson, come here, I need you," purportedly Alexander Graham Bell's first words ever spoken over a telephone. However, historical records indicate the words to be "Watson, come here, I want you." The error was not present in Paul Cornell's original script, but crept in at some point during production. Producer Phil Collinson speculated that it was because the line was rerecorded: it was originally recorded by someone who the production team felt put on too false a Scottish accent, and so it was rerecorded by a real Scot.

== Broadcast and reception ==
"Father's Day" was first broadcast in the United Kingdom on 14 May 2005 on BBC One. The episode received UK overnight ratings of 7.47 million viewers, an audience share of 42.74%. When time-shifted viewers were taken into account, the number rose to 8.06 million. The episode received an Audience Appreciation Index score of 83.

"Father's Day" was met with a generally positive reception. Piper stated that this was her favourite episode of the first series, and the most emotionally taxing for her to perform. SFX praised the way the concept of time was explored as well as the accurate representation of the '80s, and stated that Dingwall gave "one of the series' best performances" as Pete Tyler. However, the reviewer thought that the Reapers were the let-down of the episode, finding that "the episode doesn't feel as much like horror as it should". Arnold T Blumburg of Now Playing gave the episode an A for the emotional impact and the acting. Blumburg did note, however, that there were "enormous logical gaps" involving "glowing TARDIS keys and under-explained paradoxes". In 2013, Radio Times reviewer Mark Braxton described it as "a time-travel tale with immense heart" and highlighted the shift of identification from the Doctor to Rose and the acting of Piper and Dingwall. Braxton, on the other hand, felt that the Reapers were redundant and the episode would have done "equally well if you scythed the Reapers from the script". Reviewing "Father's Day" for The A.V. Club in 2013, Alasdair Wilkins gave it a grade of "A", finding the story powerful. In Who Is the Doctor, a guide to the revived series, Robert Smith praised the emotion and the dilemma, which he felt was not heavy-handed. He was also positive about the direction and Dingwall's performance, though he felt that removing the Doctor from the plot suggested that he would have done something else to resolve it, and he was not a fan of the scene where the Doctor tells two ordinary people how important their lives are, because it was "cheesy" and "disconnected" from the rest of the story. Coauthor Graeme Burk was also positive, writing that it may be "the best story this season". He called the direction "wonderful" and the script "sublime", and noted how the story was more about family than time travel.

"Father's Day" was nominated for the 2006 Hugo Award for Best Dramatic Presentation, Short Form, alongside other first series episodes "Dalek" and "The Empty Child" / "The Doctor Dances". The latter won. "Father's Day" topped the third place category in terms of votes.
