= The Long Game =

162 – "The Long Game"
- Doctor Who episode
- The Jagrafess looms over the Doctor, Rose, and the Editor. The Jagrafess was intended to look like "a lump of meat on the ceiling" and behave like a shark.

Cast
- Doctor: Christopher Eccleston – Ninth Doctor
- Companions: Billie Piper – Rose Tyler; Bruno Langley – Adam Mitchell
- Others: Colin Prockter – Head Chef; Christine Adams – Cathica; Anna Maxwell-Martin – Suki; Simon Pegg – The Editor; Tamsin Greig – Nurse; Judy Holt – Adam's mother

Production
- Directed by: Brian Grant
- Written by: Russell T Davies
- Produced by: Phil Collinson
- Executive producers: Russell T Davies; Julie Gardner; Mal Young
- Music by: Murray Gold
- Production code: 1.7
- Series: Series 1
- Running time: 44 minutes
- First broadcast: 7 May 2005

Chronology
| ← Preceded by "Dalek" | Followed by → "Father's Day" |

"The Long Game" is the seventh episode of the first series of the British science fiction television programme Doctor Who that was first broadcast on 7 May 2005 on BBC One. It was written by executive producer Russell T Davies and directed by Brian Grant.

In the episode, the alien time traveller the Ninth Doctor (Christopher Eccleston) and his companion Rose Tyler (Billie Piper), having been joined by near-future genius Adam Mitchell (Bruno Langley), land on Satellite 5 in the year 200,000. Satellite 5 is a space station that broadcasts news across the entire human empire. However, the Doctor notices that the station is suspicious: there are no aliens, and those who are promoted to Floor 500 seem to disappear. The Doctor and Rose discover that the Editor (Simon Pegg) and an alien are controlling the rest of humanity by way of the press. Meanwhile, Adam makes a mistake that forces the Doctor and Rose to take him home.

The concept of "The Long Game" was long believed—including by Davies himself—to have been submitted to the Doctor Who script office by Davies in the 1980s, although in 2020 he said he was mistaken. Davies had also been interested in doing a storyline about a failed companion. In addition, critics have pointed out that the story is a satire on the media. Production for the episode took place in Newport in November and December 2004 and in Coryton, Cardiff in December. "The Long Game" was watched by 8.01 million viewers in the UK and received generally mixed reviews from critics.

== Plot ==
The Ninth Doctor, Rose, and Adam arrive on Satellite 5, a space station orbiting Earth in the year 200,000. The Doctor gets Adam and Rose some credits to buy food while he looks around the station. The Doctor meets a woman named Cathica, a reporter who tells him that the station is a giant broadcast tower transmitting news across Earth. Cathica leads them to a room where she sits down in a chair located in the centre of a round table. The reporters are connected to the computer via a special port installed directly into the brain. The Doctor believes there is a malevolent purpose to the station that is holding back human development. He learns from Cathica that a select few are invited to Floor 500, which is believed to be the highest promotion that can be earned on the station.

The Doctor, with Rose, hacks into the computer systems of the station and is detected by the Editor. The Editor allows the Doctor and Rose to travel to Floor 500, with Cathica following soon after. On Floor 500 the Doctor and Rose find the Editor directing control over the station through a number of dead humans. On the ceiling resides the Editor-in-Chief, the Jagrafess, to whom the Editor answers. The Doctor learns that the Jagrafess controls the lives of the people on the planet below by manipulating the news.

Meanwhile, Adam discovers that he can gain access to information about Earth's future. He has an information port installed in his brain and uses Rose's phone to call his answering machine at home and transfer data to it. The port also allows the Jagrafess into Adam's mind. The Jagrafess learns about the Doctor and makes plans to kill him. The Doctor, aware of Cathica's presence outside the room, loudly comments on how altering the environmental systems will likely kill the Jagrafess. Cathica reverses the cooling system, causing Floor 500 to overheat, killing the Jagrafess and the Editor. As the humans on board the station and on Earth come to wake from the stupor they have been in, the Doctor congratulates Cathica and gives her hope for the future. The Doctor discovers Adam's duplicity and takes him to his home on Earth. The Doctor destroys Adam's answering machine and tells Adam he is no longer welcome in the TARDIS.

== Production ==
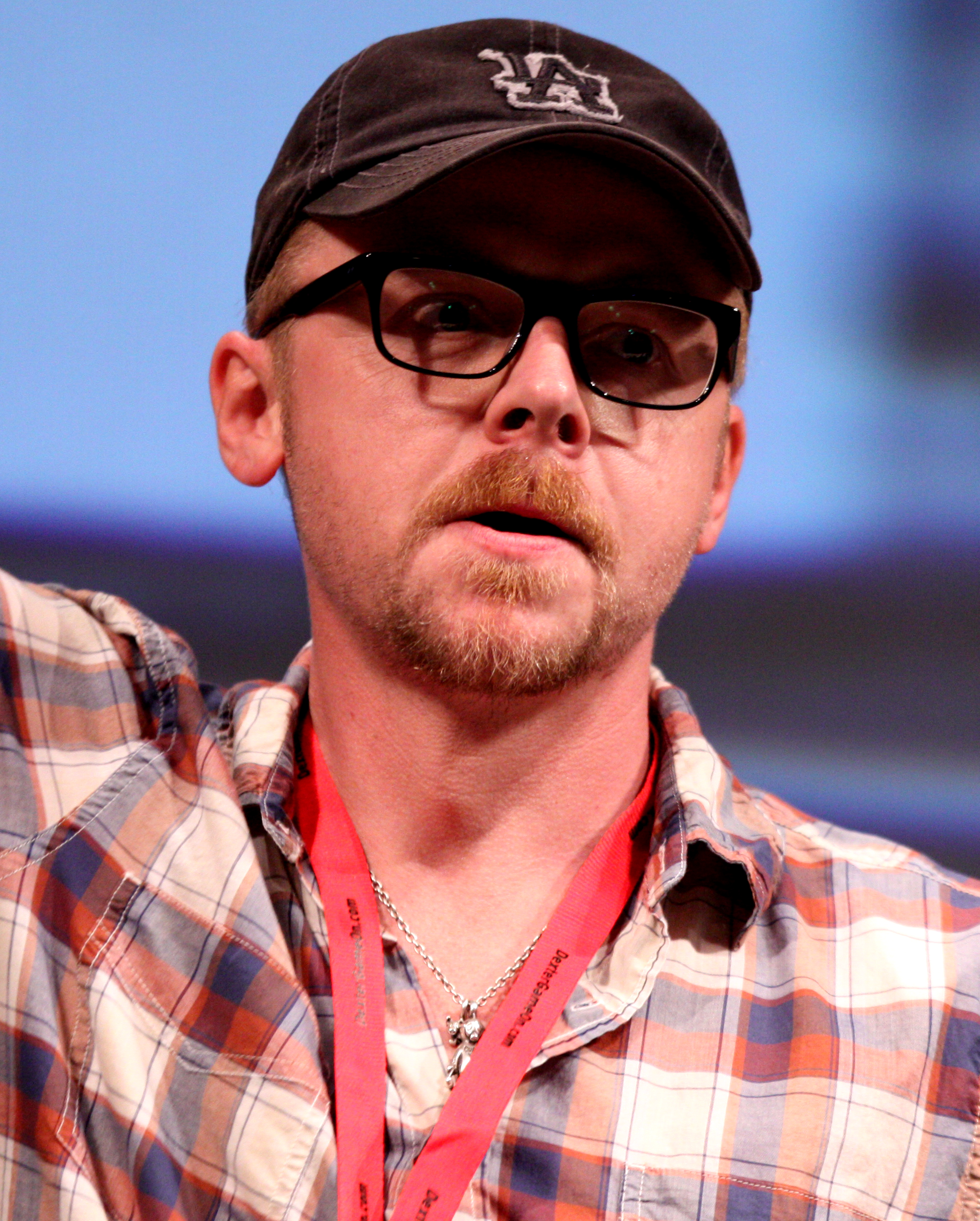
"The Long Game" features a guest appearance by Simon Pegg, who played the main villain.

In the book The Shooting Scripts, Russell T Davies claims that he had originally set out to write this episode from Adam's perspective, watching the adventure unfolding from his point of view (exactly as Rose did in "Rose") and seeing both the Doctor and Rose as enigmatic, frightening characters. He even gave this outline a working title: "Adam". Another working title for this story was "The Companion Who Couldn't". According to Davies, the concept of "The Long Game" was originally written in the 1980s and submitted to the Doctor Who production office. Whether it was ever read by the production team of the time is unclear, as Davies received a rejection from the BBC Script Unit, who advised him to write more realistic television about "a man and his mortgage" instead. In 2004 Davies said he reworked the story for the new series, but when he rediscovered his first spec script in 2020, he tweeted that he was mistaken about this.

In the DVD commentary for this episode, director Brian Grant and actor Bruno Langley refer to an additional motivation for Adam's actions. Apparently, in earlier drafts of the script, Adam's father suffered from a disease that was incurable in his time (2012) and he hoped to learn about a cure which had been discovered between that year and 200,000. In the shooting script, the condition is arthritis. No trace of this motivation remains in the finished programme, although Grant discusses it as if it were still present. Langley and Grant also reveal that the "frozen vomit" that Adam spits out in one scene was in fact a "kiwi and orange ice cube".

Simon Pegg had grown up with Doctor Who and considered it a "great honour" to guest star. He was pleased at being cast as a bad guy. Pegg had previously played Don Chaney in the Eighth Doctor audio play Invaders from Mars. When the Editor announces the Jagrafess's name to the Doctor and Rose, he pronounces it as "The Mighty Jagrafress of the Holy Hadrajassic Maxaraddenfoe." Pegg has stated during interviews that he found this an extremely difficult line to say. Voice artist Nicholas Briggs had recorded voice work for the Jagrafess, but his contribution was not used because it sounded too similar to the Nestene Consciousness (which Briggs had voiced in "Rose"). "The Long Game" was produced singularly in the series' fourth production block. Filming in the studio took place at the Unit Q2 warehouse in Newport from 30 November to 3 December, on 7 December, and from 10 to 15 December 2004. The spike room set (used for Floors 139 and 500), the control room set, and the suburban house set were recorded at the former BT building in Coryton, Cardiff on 6, 8, and 9 December. The house set was later rebuilt for recording in the Newport warehouse on 15 December. The Jagrafress was entirely made of computer-generated imagery animated by The Mill. It was given a shark-like design, with the intention that it would "snap out" like a shark. The initial design was also described as a "lump of meat on the ceiling".

== Broadcast and reception ==
"The Long Game" was first broadcast in the United Kingdom on BBC One on 7 May 2005. Overnight ratings showed that the episode had been watched by 7.51 million viewers live, a 38.9% audience share. It received a final rating of 8.01 million viewers in the UK, the sixth highest-rated broadcast on BBC One for the week. The episode received an Audience Appreciation Index score of 81. "The Long Game" was released on DVD in Region 2 alongside the following episodes "Father's Day", "The Empty Child", and "The Doctor Dances" on 1 August 2005. It was then re-released as part of the first series boxset on 21 November 2005.

The episode received generally mixed reviews. SFX described it as an "okay" episode that was reminiscent of the earlier episode "The End of the World." Despite praising Pegg, the theme of "media control," and the Jagrafess, they criticised it for "[failing] to capture the imagination" because there was "no real palpable sense of threat" and that human culture looked identical to modern day. Rupert Smith of The Guardian wrote, "Anything that satirises the profession of journalism is all right with me, but this did it with style." Arnold T Blumburg of Now Playing gave "The Long Game" a grade of B−, describing it as "entertaining" and a welcome throwback to the classic series. However, he questioned the developing tradition of the Doctor not being the hero of the episode and noted that there were some dangling threads. Reviewing the episode in 2013, Patrick Mulkern of Radio Times was more positive, writing that it "acts brilliantly as a satire of the media." He also praised the guest cast and characters and Adam's departure. In 2011, Den of Geek's Mark Harrison wrote that "In retrospect, 'The Long Game' is an underrated and perfectly enjoyable mid-series episode," praising Adam's departure.

Reviewing "The Long Game" for The A.V. Club in 2013, Alasdair Wilkins gave it a grade of "B−". He found it "inessential" and commented that it was not very clear on the motives of the Editor and Jagrafess, but Pegg's performance was almost enough to make up for it. Overall he felt that the story "presents a few too many simple ideas, with the cumulative effect that this is a story that feels slight at best, underdeveloped at worst. The episode is hardly a failure, but it could have been so much more." In Who Is the Doctor, a guide to the revived series, Graeme Burk described the episode as "entertaining, if unspectacular." He called Pegg the best guest star so far, and stated that Langley did a "superb job" at conveying Adam, but he felt that the episode did not have much else beside the failed companion storyline. Burk criticised the satire for not being subtle enough and borrowing from other stories such as Nineteen Eighty-Four. He also remarked that it was a shame Adam's motives were cut, as well as development between Rose and Adam. Burk's coauthor Stacey Smith? was more positive, opining that a satire did not have to be subtle to be effective, and that viewers could still relate it to the news media today. Smith? also praised the way "The Long Game" showed the Ninth Doctor as an "inspirational figure." The two also questioned the decision to leave Adam in the 21st century with future technology.
