= Susan Yankowitz =

American dramatist and novelist

Susan Yankowitz (born February 20, 1941, in Newark, New Jersey) is an American dramatist and novelist who has created works on mortality, violence against women, and the Jonestown Massacre.

== Personal life ==
Yankowitz gave birth to a son, Gabriel, in 1983.

== Career ==
Yankowitz completed her undergraduate degree at Sarah Lawrence College, and she earned a graduate degree at the Yale School of Drama. She subsequently submitted a play to Joseph Chaikin and The Open Theater.

In 1968, Chaiken invited her to attend workshops at which The Open Theater was developing a performance piece on the topic of mortality. Unbeknownst to Yankowitz, she was actually one of three playwrights attending the workshops, who might be selected to write the text. She was eventually chosen to write the text for the play which was titled Terminal. The play opened in repertory in May 1970. Yankowitz received a Drama Desk Award for most promising playwright. In 1996, Terminal was revived as 1969 Terminal 1996 and revised to address the AIDS epidemic.

Based upon her success with The Open Theater, Yankowitz was recognized as a collaborative playwright, and she worked with various other theatrical troupes in that capacity. However, she found that none of these collaborations had the depth of her experience with The Open Theater. As a result, she began writing her first novel, Silent Witness and declined an opportunity to collaborate with Peter Brooks in order to complete it.

According to Yankowitz, she has increasingly had difficulty in having her plays produced because she writes in an expressionistic style, rather than a naturalistic style. She has written plays about such topics as motherhood of a mass murderer (A Knife in the Heart), the Jonestown massacre ('Slain In The Spirit), and aphasia (Night Sky).

In 2007, Yankowitz collaborated with six other women playwrights, including Anna Deavere Smith, to write the documentary play Seven Each playwright conducted interviews with a woman who had overcome obstacles in her homeland and had made important contributions to her community. Yankowitz interviewed Mukjar Mai and wrote the segment about her experience. Mai had been raped by a gang in Afghanistan, and she successfully had her attackers prosecuted. The opera Cheri is based upon the Colette novel, Cheri. The musical Slain In The Spirit recounts the Jamestown massacre and the opera Thumbprint tells the story of Mai.

According to Yankowitz, the "topsy-turvy" world of a playwright is best illustrated by her aborted efforts to collaborate on the book for the 1983 Broadway musical Baby. Yankowitz and her co-writer had a dispute about certain language proposed to be used in the script. Since they were both represented by the same agent, they agreed to have the agent mediate the dispute. The dispute was resolved by Yankowitz withdrawing but being accorded with the billing “based upon a story developed with Susan Yankowitz.” She was also accorded .5% royalty. Yankowitz has reported that she has earned more money from that small royalty than she has earned from all of the royalties from her other plays combined.

In 2016, Yankowitz completed the last play that she will ever write: The Crazy But True Tragical-Farcical Trial of Madame P, A Theatrical Bestiary Inspired by Trials of the Middle Ages wherein a Pig and Various 4-Legged and Winged Creatures Are Prosecuted for Theft, Murder, Bestiality and Diverse Crimes against Humankind. The play explores the trial of a 200-pound sow, who has devoured a baby, and is narrated by the sow's defense attorney. The play has not yet been produced.

Yankowitz's papers are held in the Kent State University Special Collections. The papers cover Yankowitz's full career, and she submits additional items to the collection biannually.

== Awards ==
Joseph E. Levine Fellowship in Screenwriting

Drama Desk Award for most promising playwright 1970

Massachusetts Circle Award for best play 2016 for Night Sky

== Selected plays ==
(the dates are those of production and/or publication)

- Rats’ Alley
- That Old Rock-a-Bye
- The Ha-Ha Play
- The Lamb
- Terminal (1970)
- Slaughterhouse Play (1971)
- Wooden Nickels (1973)
- Boxes (later revised as *A Z Boxes) (1973)
- True Romances (1977) musical with music by Elmer Bernstein
- A Knife in the Heart (1982)
- Alarms (1986)
- Night Sky (1991)
- Real Life (1993)
- Under The Skin (1996)
- 1969 Terminal 1996 (1996)
- Phaedra In Delirium (1998)
- Cheri (2000) an opera with music by Michael Dellaira
- Slain In The Heart musical with music by Taj Mahal
- Seven (2008) the segment on Muhkjar Mai
- Night Sky (revised) (2009)
- Thumbprint (2014) an opera with music by Kamala Sankaram
- Gun published in The Methuen Drama Anthology of American Playwrights 1970-2020 (2020) Wesley Brown & Aimee K. Michel, editors, Bloomsbury Publishing
- The Crazy But True Tragical-Farcical Trial of Madame P.

== Other literary works ==
- Silent Witness, novel about a deafmute, 1976
