= Bruno Langley =

English musician and former actor (born 1983)

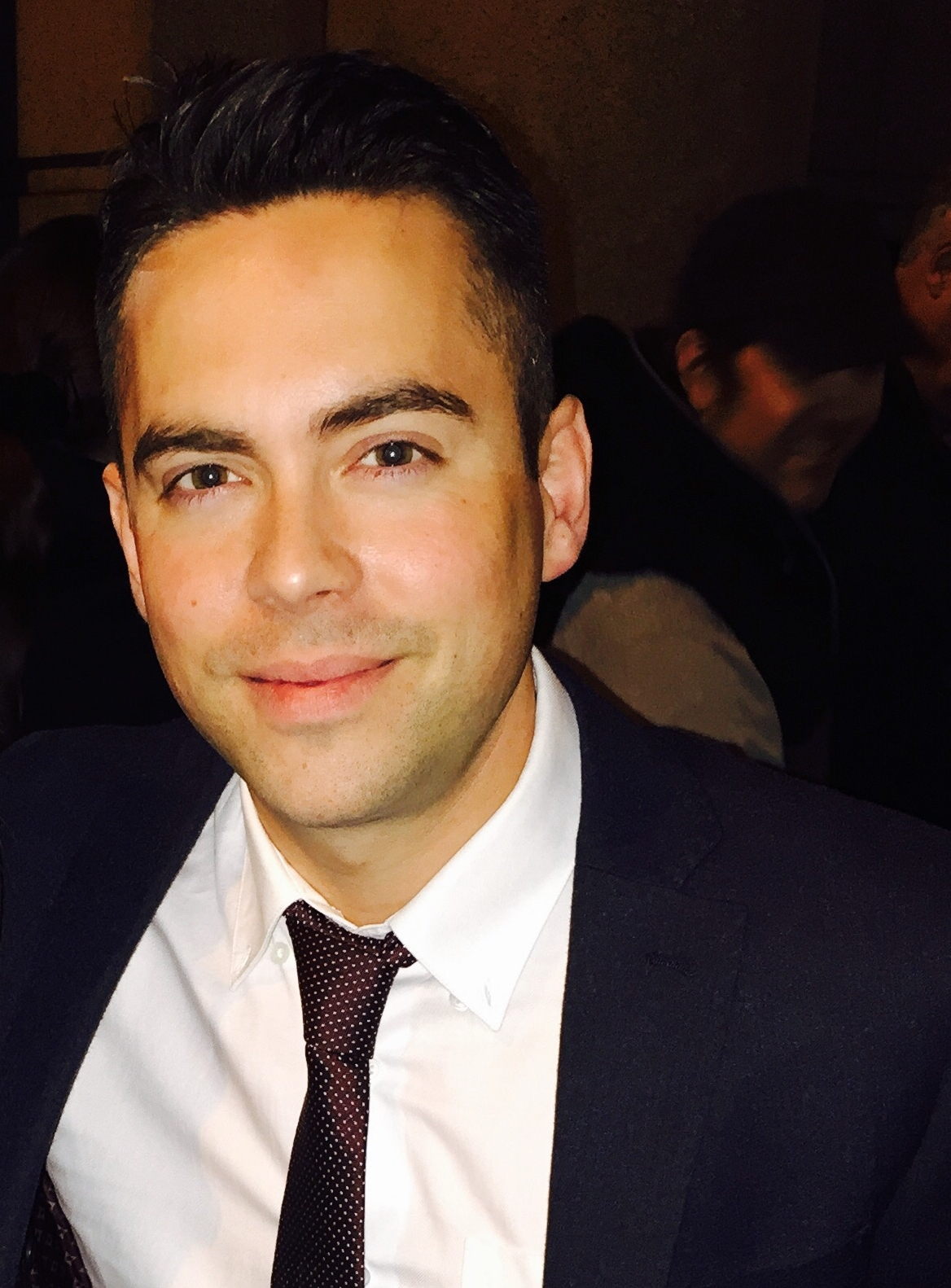
- Langley in 2015
- Occupations: Former actor, musician
- Years active: 2000–present
- Notable work: Coronation Street; Linda Green; Doctor Who
- Partner(s): Victoria Roscoe (2004–2012)
- Children: 1

Bruno Langley is an English musician and former actor. He is known for his roles as Todd Grimshaw in Coronation Street (over 700 episodes between 2001 and 2017) and Adam Mitchell in Doctor Who (2005).

In October 2017, a spokesman for the show confirmed that Langley's Coronation Street contract had been terminated. Greater Manchester Police later announced he had been charged with two counts of sexual assault, to both of which he pleaded guilty on 28 November 2017; he was sentenced to a 12-month community order.

In 2021, Langley announced his intention to pursue his musical aspirations by releasing his first recordings.

== Early life ==
Langley attended Harpur Hill Primary School and Buxton Community School. He trained at the North Cheshire Theatre School in Heaton Moor. Along with his sisters, he was a member of a number of junior string orchestras in which he played cello.

== Career ==
=== Film and television ===
From 2001 to 2004, Langley played the character of Todd Grimshaw in the ITV soap opera Coronation Street. As the first openly gay character on the show, Langley developed a large gay following.

He had also appeared in Coronation Street on 4 August 2000 as Darren Michaels, then boyfriend of Candice. He also had a semi-regular role from 2001 to 2002 in Linda Green as Philip "Fizz" Green, the eponymous character's younger brother.

While on leave from Coronation Street, he has played roles such as the part of Adam Mitchell in the 2005 series of Doctor Who appearing in two episodes, "Dalek" and "The Long Game", and provided an audio commentary for the DVD of these episodes. He also filmed a small role in the feature film The League of Gentlemen's Apocalypse, released in June 2005, as well an episode of Dalziel and Pascoe and the little-seen film Halal Harry in 2006, and read Horace for BBC Radio 7.

He returned to Coronation Street for a twelve-episode guest stint in 2007 and one episode in April 2011. In June 2013 it was announced that Langley was returning to Coronation Street as a regular character and his character returned on screen on 4 November. Following his sexual assault charges, Langley's contract with Coronation Street was terminated in October 2017.

=== Theatre ===
In the summer of 2005, Langley made his stage debut in an acclaimed run of Romeo and Juliet opposite fellow ex-soap actress Scarlett Alice Johnson at Stafford Castle. Taking on the role of Romeo, The British Theatre Guide described Langley as, 'immediately comfortable with the verse, finding no difficulty in being the lovesick youngster before he's gripped with passion for Juliet. Later, he convincingly shows a tantrum-like immaturity at his banishment.'

On 30 October 2005, he appeared on stage at the Old Vic in London in the one-night-only play Night Sky with Christopher Eccleston, Navin Chowdhry, David Warner, Saffron Burrows and David Baddiel.

In the spring of 2006, Langley appeared in Life Imitates Art at the Camden People's Theatre, Camden. Also in 2006 he was seen in a production of A Taste of Honey, taking on the role of repressed gay art student, Geoffrey. In his role as Geoffrey, Langley was described as, 'quietly impressive, poignantly conveying Geoffrey's unending loyalty with ease.' The production toured the UK extensively and played a short run at the Richmond Theatre.

Beginning in May 2008, he appeared in the premiere stage run of the new musical Sleeping Beauty starring opposite fellow Coronation Street alumna Lucy Evans at the Gaiety Theatre in Dublin.

Langley also appeared in the stage show Flashdance the Musical with Victoria Hamilton-Barritt, Bernie Nolan and Noel Sullivan. Langley received positive reviews for his role as Jimmy Kaminsky, with What's on Stage stating, 'Bruno Langley also fares well as Jimmy, particularly when he has the chance to showcase his fine voice in the second act.' and Lindsay Corr stating in the Edinburgh Guide that, 'Bruno Langley as Jimmy shows acting doesn't have to take a back seat in musical theatre, as he twitches about the stage in his grey hoodie and delivers his number, 'You Can't Keep Me Down', with understated aplomb.'

In 2010–2011, he joined the tour of Calendar Girls, in the role of the young photographer, Lawrence. In reviewing the Liverpool Empire Theatre production of the show, Liverpool Sound and Vision said Langley, 'gave outstanding moments of beautiful comic timing as young photographer Lawrence that it's no wonder he was asked back to reprise his role from last year.'

In November 2012, he began playing Giles Ralston in the 60th anniversary tour of The Mousetrap by Agatha Christie.

=== Music ===
Langley played the cello until the age of 16, when he decided to pursue a career as an actor. In addition, he plays the piano. In 2010, he formed a band, Bruno Langley and the Wonderland Band. In a 2011 interview with Dianne Bourne of the Manchester Evening News, he stated, "I've been acting on and off ever since the age of 17, but always in between jobs I'd sit at the piano and write songs, and sing different songs. A year and a half ago I got a band together, we had a few rehearsals, I had fun doing it and it's gone from there really." The band performs songs from the 1950s, as well as taking modern tracks and arranging them into jazz, blues and swing styles. Langley has stated that he does the arrangements himself.

As a musician, Langley performed at Manchester Pride in 2011. He released an EP called Jump in July 2016. Langley re-launched his music career in October 2020, when he released a single, "Collide". He released another single in June 2021, titled "Downpour".

==== Extended Plays ====
| Date | Title | Chart positions |
| Date | Title | UK |
|---|---|---|
| 1 July 2016 | Jump: Debut Extended Play | - |

=== Singles ===
| Year | Title | Peak chart positions |
| Year | Title | UK |
|---|---|---|
| 7 October 2020 | Collide | - |
| 9 June 2021 | Downpour | - |

=== Audio dramas ===
Following his role as Adam Mitchell in the 2005 season of BBC's Doctor Who, Langley reprised his role for a single audio drama developed by Big Finish Productions in 2017. Following his sexual assault allegations, he was not invited to return for later stories.

=== Photography ===
Langley responded to tabloid reports in August 2019 by confirming on Twitter that he had been working as a portrait photographer.

== Personal life ==
Langley was in a relationship with Victoria Roscoe, a beautician, from 2004 until 2012. Roscoe gave birth to their son, Freddie, in May 2007. In November 2013, Langley revealed he and Roscoe had ended their relationship, but were sharing the upbringing of their son.

=== Conviction ===
In October 2017, a woman complained to ITV that Langley had harassed and sexually assaulted her at Band on the Wall, a Manchester music venue. After an internal investigation into the woman's allegations, Langley's contract with Coronation Street was terminated with immediate effect. His character continued to appear on screen until December 2017. On 30 October 2017, police confirmed that Langley had been charged with two counts of sexual assault. Langley appeared in court on 28 November 2017 and pleaded guilty to the charges. His drunkenness on the night was considered as an aggravating factor by District Judge Mark Hadfield, who sentenced Langley to a twelve-month community order and 40 days of rehabilitation activity. Langley was also ordered to observe a curfew, wear an electronic tag, pay £250 compensation to his victims and sign onto the sex offender register for five years.

== Filmography ==
=== Television ===
| Year | Title | Role | Notes |
|---|---|---|---|
| 2000 | Coronation Street | Darren Michaels | 1 episode |
| 2001–2004, 2007, 2011, 2013–2017 | Coronation Street | Todd Grimshaw | 779 episodes |
| 2001–2002 | Linda Green | Philip "Fizz" Green | Semi-regular, 6 episodes |
| 2003 | Stars in Their Eyes: Coronation Street Special | Himself / Robbie Williams | Coronation Street spin-off |
| 2005 | Doctor Who | Adam Mitchell | 2 episodes: "Dalek" and "The Long Game" |
| 2006 | Dalziel and Pascoe | Jason Parker | 2 episodes |

=== Film ===
| Year | Title | Role |
|---|---|---|
| 2005 | The League of Gentlemen's Apocalypse | Damon |
| 2006 | Halal Harry | Eric the Milkman |

=== Theatre ===
| Year | Title | Role | Notes |
|---|---|---|---|
| 2005 | Romeo and Juliet | Romeo | Stafford Castle |
| 2005 | Night Sky | Ali | Old Vic |
| 2006 | Love Trilogy Part One: Life Imitates Art | Nathan | People's Theatre, Camden |
| 2006 | A Taste of Honey | Geoffrey | Richmond Theatre |
| 2008 | Sleeping Beauty | | Gaiety Theatre, Dublin |
| 2008 | Flashdance The Musical | Jimmy | |
| 2010 | Intimate Strangers | Tarquin Olivier | Vaudeville Theatre, London |
| 2010–2011 | Calendar Girls | Lawrence / Liam | |
| 2012–2013 | The Mousetrap | Giles Ralston | |

=== Audio Dramas ===
| Year | Title | Role | Notes |
|---|---|---|---|
| 2017 | Doctor Who: The Ninth Doctor Chronicles | Adam Mitchell | 1 episode: The Other Side |
