= Dalek (Doctor Who episode) =

161 – "Dalek"
- Doctor Who episode

Cast
- Doctor: Christopher Eccleston – Ninth Doctor
- Companions: Billie Piper – Rose Tyler; Bruno Langley – Adam Mitchell
- Others: Corey Johnson – Henry van Statten; Anna-Louise Plowman – Diana Goddard; Steven Beckingham – Polkowski; Nigel Whitmey – Simmons; John Schwab – Owen Bywater; Jana Carpenter – De Maggio; Joe Montana – Commander; Barnaby Edwards – Dalek Operator; Nicholas Briggs – Dalek Voice

Production
- Directed by: Joe Ahearne
- Written by: Robert Shearman
- Produced by: Phil Collinson
- Executive producers: Russell T Davies; Julie Gardner; Mal Young
- Music by: Murray Gold
- Production code: 1.6
- Series: Series 1
- Running time: 45 minutes
- First broadcast: 30 April 2005

Chronology
← Preceded by "World War Three"	Followed by → "The Long Game"

"Dalek" is the sixth episode of the revived first series of the British science fiction television programme Doctor Who. It was first broadcast on BBC One on 30 April 2005. This episode is the first appearance of the Daleks in the 21st-century revival of Doctor Who; it also marks the first appearance of Bruno Langley as companion Adam Mitchell.

The episode is set in Utah in the year 2012, in the underground bunker owned by Henry van Statten (Corey Johnson), a rich collector of alien artefacts. In the episode, the alien time traveller the Ninth Doctor (Christopher Eccleston) and his travelling companion Rose Tyler (Billie Piper) encounter the bunker's only living exhibit: a Dalek, which breaks loose and attempts to exterminate everyone in the bunker after repairing itself.

== Plot ==
The Ninth Doctor and Rose are drawn by a distress signal to a massive bunker beneath Utah in 2012, filled with alien artefacts collected by the bunker's owner, Henry Van Statten. Rose is offered a tour of the facility by Adam Mitchell, a man who buys and catalogues artefacts for van Statten. Van Statten takes the Doctor to show him a living alien being that he has in captivity, which the Doctor recognises as a Dalek, a race thought to have been wiped out in the Time War. The Dalek is seriously wounded and weakened, and unable to break its bonds, but when the Doctor attempts to destroy it, van Statten orders his guards to restrain the Doctor and return him to his offices. There, van Statten has the Doctor secured, noting that not only does he collect aliens, but also tortures them to gain information, and proceeds to invasively and violently study the Doctor's body to learn more about his physiology.

Meanwhile, Adam has taken Rose to the Dalek. Rose takes pity on the weakened creature and touches its casing; the Dalek promptly absorbs her DNA extrapolating the biomass of a time traveller, and is able to re-energise itself. (Note: In the 2006 episode "Doomsday", Rose refers to this as the Daleks using the harmless background radiation that is picked up by time travellers as a power source. Neither "Dalek" nor "Doomsday" name this radiation.) It escapes its bonds, kills several guards, and repairs its casing. Connecting to the Internet, the Dalek realises that it is the last surviving Dalek. With no other purpose, it returns to the Daleks' prime directive: to target and exterminate all non-Dalek life forms. Van Statten is forced to release the Doctor to help stop the Dalek, but the Dalek refuses to cooperate, and continues killing all those left in the Vault.

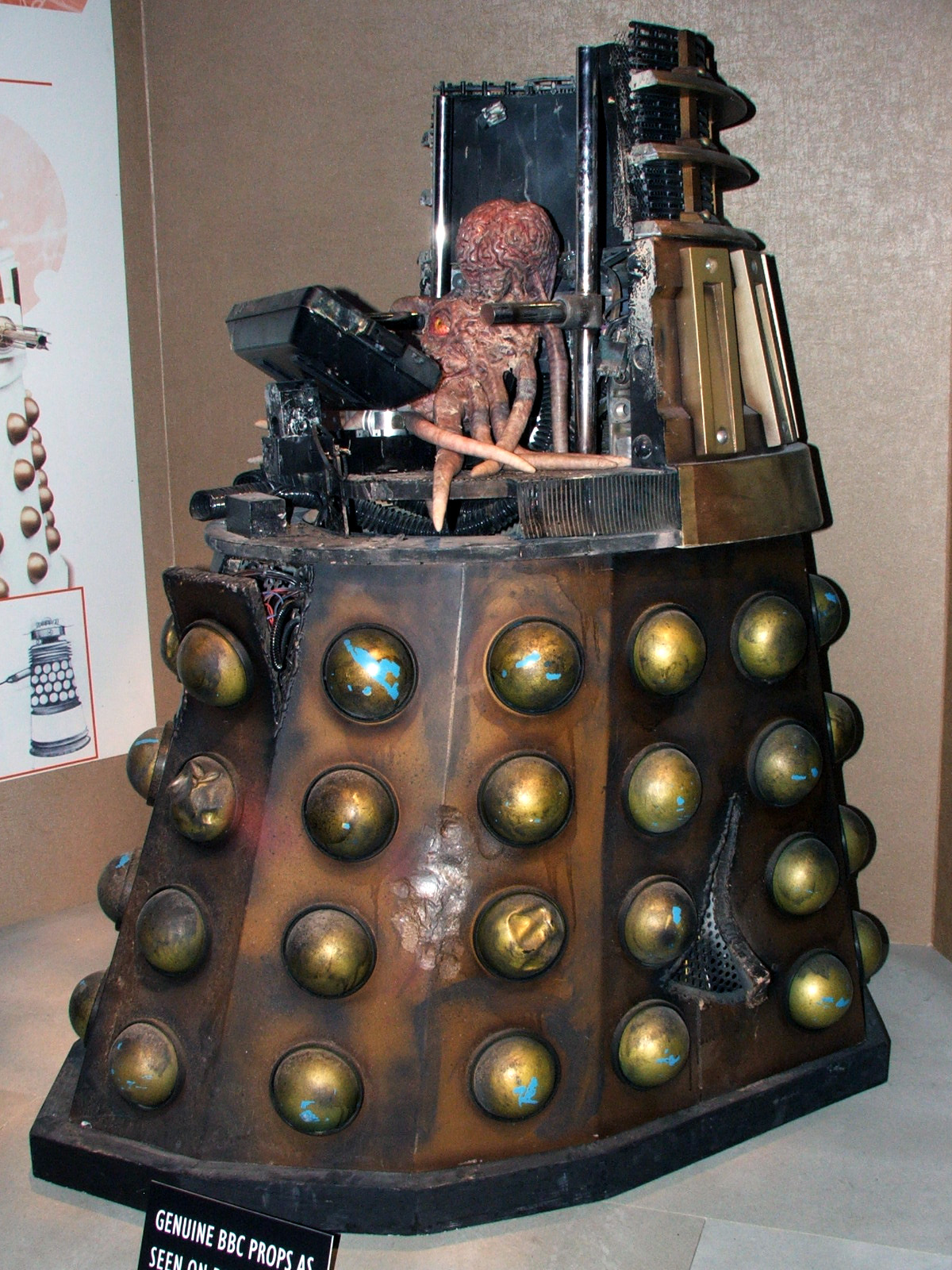
The Dalek's open casing, as shown at the Doctor Who Experience.

The Dalek prepares to kill Rose but is unable to, realising in horror that it can now feel fear after absorbing Rose's DNA, and begins to question itself. The Doctor arrives and prepares to kill the Dalek, but Rose stops him, convincing him he is becoming like a Dalek. The Dalek is unable to cope with its new emotions, concluding that its existence is "sickness". It asks Rose to allow it to die. Rose gives the order, and the Dalek self-destructs. Van Statten's assistant Goddard takes over the bunker, planning to wipe van Statten's memories and fill the bunker with cement. Rose offers Adam the chance to travel with her and the Doctor, since he will have no job after this. Adam accepts the offer.

== Production ==
=== Conception ===
Rob Shearman, the writer of the episode, had his first encounter with the revived series of Doctor Who in 2003 after he created the Sixth Doctor audio Jubilee. Executive producer Russell T Davies drew heavily on Jubilee to create "Return of the Daleks" for his pitch to the BBC, a story with which Davies hoped to recreate the menace shown by the Daleks in their 1963 debut The Daleks. The adventure changed the setting from the alternate Earth in Jubilee to 2012 Utah, with the lone Dalek featured being held captive by businessman Henry Van Statten, a caricature of Microsoft's chairman Bill Gates.

According to Shearman the script went through 14 revisions. The story itself was initially called "Creature of Lies", and Van Statten was originally called Hiram Duchesne. For a short period of time, Adam was the villain's son, but Shearman decided against it. The most notable change to the script happened when the Nation estate, holders of the rights for the Daleks, blocked the use of the Daleks due to the BBC licensing them out too much. The changed story contained an alien akin to a child who kills for pleasure, which eventually evolved into the Toclafane from "The Sound of Drums" and "Last of the Time Lords". Finally, the BBC was able to secure the rights from the Nation estate, and at the same time gave the episode its final name, "Dalek".

Davies wished for the episode to be emotional rather than "rely on people running down corridors". Shearman expressed a desire "to take all those things people find funny about the Daleks and turn them into something people would find memorable."

=== Filming ===
The episode was placed in the third production block, along with "Father's Day" and "The Long Game", the latter taken out due to delays in special effects creation. Filming of the episode began on 25 October 2004 at the National Museum Cardiff, before moving to the Millennium Stadium the following day, where most of the episode was filmed. Most of the filming finished on 3 November 2004, with pick-up shots completed at the show's studio space in Newport throughout the remainder of the month.

== Critical reception and awards ==
When the episode was released on DVD, the British Board of Film Classification (BBFC) gave it a 12 rating, because of the scenes where the Doctor is seen to torture the Dalek. The BBFC stated, "We are concerned about role models for children using the sort of tactics that Doctor Who used against the Dalek. If that was transferred into the playground it would be something we would want to tackle."

Reception to the episode was positive. The episode's overnight ratings were 7.73 million viewers with 46% of the audience share, later finalised to 8.64 million viewers. The episode received an Audience Appreciation Index score of 84. The Times stated that the episode was an "unqualified triumph". The Guardian commented that "Shearman's script bamboozles expectations", and the episode "should hopefully show 2005's kids what was always so wonderful about the iconic tin-rotters." The London Evening Standard found the lack of surprise (namely, calling the episode "Dalek") the only disappointment, and Daily Mirror simply stated that "for 30 pant-shittingly wonderful minutes, BBC1's new Doctor Who was the best thing on telly. Ever." In 2010 Den of Geek placed the episode as number 2 in their list of the Top 10 Dalek stories.

The episode was nominated for the 2006 Hugo Award for Best Dramatic Presentation, Short Form along with other Doctor Who episodes "Father's Day" and "The Empty Child"/"The Doctor Dances". The stories came third, fifth, and first, respectively.

== Commercial releases ==
=== In print ===
Dalek
- Author: Robert Shearman
- Cover artist: Anthony Dry
- Series: Doctor Who book: Target novelisations
- Publisher: BBC Books
- Publication date: 11 March 2021
- ISBN: 978-1-785-94503-8

A novelisation of this story written by Robert Shearman was released in paperback and digital formats on 11 March 2021 as part of the Target Collection.
