= Night Sky (play) =

Night Sky is a 1991 play by Susan Yankowitz, which originally premiered in New York starring Joan MacIntosh, under the direction of Joseph Chaikin. Joseph Chaikin's struggles with stroke and aphasia were the original inspiration for the play. It was later produced in a revised version under the direction of Daniella Topol and featuring Jordan Baker in the main role.

== Plot ==
The play is set in modern times. Anna, a brilliant and articulate astronomer, wants to be on a promising academic career. However, she is suddenly struck by a car and develops aphasia. Anna's life becomes more difficult; she also dealt with her lover and her teen-aged daughter while attempting to continue her career. Anna later tries to recover and to deliver her research paper at a prestigious conference in Paris.

== Characters ==
- Anna – an astronomer and the protagonist of the play.
- Jen – Anna's teen-aged daughter.
- Daniel – Anna's love interest, an aspiring opera singer.
- Bill – Anna's colleague, another astronomer with the university.

== Background ==
Yankowitz was commissioned to write the play that would become Night Sky after her friend and mentor, director Joseph Chaikin, suffered a stroke during heart surgery and developed aphasia. Chaikin eventually recovered. Yankowitz recalled how "When he would go out in public—similar to what I showed in the play—people would assume he was an idiot, he didn't understand anything. For somebody of Joe's outstanding intelligence and previous eloquence, it was just a horrible situation."

Chaikin has stated that he wanted to distance himself somewhat from the play, so he created the play's protagonist as a woman, not a man, and he wanted the aphasia to develop due to an automobile accident instead of a stroke or surgery, and that the protagonist should be an astronomer.
