= Spank! =

- Directed by: Ernie Clark
- Written by: David Lightfoot; David Farrell
- Produced by: David Lightfoot
- Starring: Robert Mammone
- Edited by: Edward McQueen-Mason
- Production companies: UltraFilms; Film Finance Corporation Australia; South Australian Film Corporation
- Distributed by: Palace Films
- Release date: 10 June 1999 (Adelaide)
- Running time: 89 mins
- Country: Australia
- Language: English
- Budget: $1.4 million
- Box office: A$62,374 (Australia)

Spank! is a 1999 Australian comedy film directed by Ernie Clark and starring Robert Mammone. It was filmed in Adelaide. Rolf de Heer was an executive producer.

== Premise ==
Paulie returns to Adelaide after three years in an Italian monastery and reconnects with his friends, Nick and Vinny. He goes to work at Vinny's parents cafe. Paulie and his friends decide to set up their own cafe.

== Cast ==
- Robert Mammone as Paulie
- Vince Poletto as Rocky
- Victoria Dixon-Whittle as Jo
- Mario Gamma as Nick
- Lucia Mastrantone as Tina
- Checc Musolino as Vinny
- Marco P. Venturini as Ang
- Charlotte Rees as Kylie
- Nic Hurcombe as Bruce
- Maris J. Caune as Fat Remmy
- Rosalba Clemente as Nick's Ma

== Production ==
The movie was originally titled Little Big Men, but it was decided to change it out of fear the film might be mistaken with Little Big Man. A competition for a new title was held in cafes of Melbourne, Adelaide and Sydney resulting in Spank! Filming began in January 1998.

== Release ==
The film enjoyed an 11-week run in Adelaide cinemas. After sales to video and overseas cable the movie reportedly recouped its budget.

== Reception ==
David Stratton in Variety called it a "good-natured comedy about a bunch of Italo-Australians involved in the colorful cafe society in Adelaide" which "suffers from a thinly constructed screenplay and frequently strident handling."

The Age called it "shrill and awkwardly paced" but praised the "understated" performance from Robert Mammone.

SBS Movies wrote that the film "boasts characters that are just too unbelievable, even if you grant the film is a farce. The story is ridiculous and it's resolved way too perfunctorily but it has an energy and some terrific performances."
