= List of Doctor Who: The Classic Series audio plays by Big Finish =

This is a list of audio productions based on the classic era of the long-running British science fiction television series Doctor Who produced by Big Finish Productions.

== Cast ==
The dramas feature both former actors who portrayed the Doctor and his companions, and new continuing characters as well as elements from other spin-off media. The canonicity of the audio dramas, as with other Doctor Who spin-off media, is unclear. To date, productions have featured the Fourth (Tom Baker), Fifth (Peter Davison), Sixth (Colin Baker), Seventh (Sylvester McCoy) and Eighth (Paul McGann) Doctors portrayed by their original actors.

Big Finish's current licence from the BBC allows it to produce audio dramas featuring the first thirteen incarnations of the Doctor and associated characters introduced into the series between 1963 and 2022.

Nearly all of the companions from the original series have appeared, voiced by their original actors. They include Susan (Carole Ann Ford), Ian Chesterton (William Russell), Vicki (Maureen O'Brien), Steven Taylor (Peter Purves), Sara Kingdom (Jean Marsh), Polly (Anneke Wills), Jamie McCrimmon (Frazer Hines), Victoria Waterfield (Deborah Watling), Zoe Heriot (Wendy Padbury), Jo Grant (Katy Manning), Brigadier Lethbridge-Stewart (Nicholas Courtney), Sergeant Benton (John Levene), Mike Yates (Richard Franklin), Leela (Louise Jameson), K9 (John Leeson), Romana I (Mary Tamm), Romana II (Lalla Ward), Adric (Matthew Waterhouse), Nyssa (Sarah Sutton), Tegan Jovanka (Janet Fielding), Vislor Turlough (Mark Strickson), Peri Brown (Nicola Bryant), Melanie Bush (Bonnie Langford) and Ace (Sophie Aldred).

Several actors who played the Doctor and companions of previous Doctors have appeared in other roles, including Russell, O'Brien, Marsh, Wills, Watling, Padbury, Caroline John, Manning, Elisabeth Sladen, Leeson, Daphne Ashbrook, Tennant and Bernard Cribbins. Sladen also reprised Sarah Jane Smith in a spin-off series simply entitled Sarah Jane Smith. Sladen never appeared as Sarah alongside any incarnation of the Doctor for Big Finish; a series with Tom Baker was planned, but was never recorded due to Sladen's untimely death in April 2011.

Initially Matthew Waterhouse declined to reprise the role of Adric so the character was recast and played by Andrew Sachs as an older version of the character. Waterhouse later returned to the role on an ongoing basis.

Big Finish also started The Companion Chronicles series of plays, featuring a companion or friend of the Doctor and a supporting cast member. Ford, Russell, O'Brien, Purves, Marsh, Wills, Hines, Watling, Padbury, Manning, Jameson, Tamm, Ward, Sutton, Strickson and Aldred have all reprised their roles in this series along with John (Liz).

As well as this, Big Finish started the Doctor Who: The Early Adventures series of full-cast plays, featuring the First Doctor (recast to William Russell and Peter Purves, following William Hartnell's death in 1975) and the Second Doctor (recast to Frazer Hines, following Patrick Troughton's death in 1987), and companions Barbara Wright (recast to Maureen O'Brien and Jemma Powell, following Jacqueline Hill's death in 1993) and Ben Jackson (recast to Elliot Chapman, following Michael Craze's death in 1998), and Russell, Ford, O'Brien, Purves, Marsh, Wills, Hines, Watling and Padbury reprising their roles from the original series. They also started The Third Doctor Adventures series of full-cast plays, featuring Tim Treloar recast as the Third Doctor (following Jon Pertwee's death in 1996), Manning as Jo, and Franklin as Yates.

New companions created for the audio series include Evelyn Smythe (Maggie Stables), Charley Pollard (India Fisher), Erimem (Caroline Morris), Hex Schofield (Philip Olivier), C'rizz (Conrad Westmaas), Lucie Miller (Sheridan Smith), Thomas Brewster (John Pickard), Abby (Ciara Janson), Tamsin Drew (Niky Wardley), Elizabeth Elizabeth Klein (Tracey Childs), Flip Jackson (Lisa Greenwood), Molly O'Sullivan (Ruth Bradley), Liv Chenka (Nicola Walker), Helen Sinclair (Hattie Morahan) and Constance Clarke (Miranda Raison). Lisa Bowerman has appeared as Bernice Summerfield, a companion from the Virgin New Adventures, in several Doctor Who audio dramas as well as in original productions with her as the central character. Robert Jezek and Jemima Rooper have appeared as Frobisher and Izzy Sinclair, companions from the Doctor Who Magazine comic strip, Travis Oliver and Yasmin Bannerman have portrayed companions Roz Forrester and Chris Cwej from the Virgin New Adventures, and Matt Di Angelo has played Fitz Kreiner, a companion from the BBC Eighth Doctor Adventures.

Charley, C'rizz, Lucie, Tamsin and Molly were all referenced by name in the mini-episode "The Night of the Doctor".

== Broadcast ==
In 2005, six of the audio dramas featuring Paul McGann as the Eighth Doctor were broadcast on the digital radio station BBC 7: Storm Warning, Sword of Orion, The Stones of Venice, Invaders from Mars, Shada (originally created for webcast on the BBC's online service), and The Chimes of Midnight. These plays were rebroadcast on BBC7 beginning in July 2006. The Chimes of Midnight was repeated again as part of "The New Eighth Doctor Adventures" Series 1 & 2 in 2009.

In January 2007, a new series of Eighth Doctor audio adventures was broadcast on BBC7. These starred McGann alongside Sheridan Smith as the aforementioned new companion Lucie Miller. There were eight 50-minute episodes in total; the first and last stories were two-parters, and the rest were single episodes. These adventures have since been released on CD. In 2008, BBC7 broadcast the second series of The New Eighth Doctor Adventures (which Big Finish had already released on CD) bar the final two-part story. All fourteen episodes were then repeated in 2009, and the final two-part story later that year. Big Finish has gone on to produce two further series of these Adventures, and four selected stories from the third series were aired in 2010, with BBC Radio 4 Extra (as Radio 7 became) skipping ahead to the fourth series in early 2013.

In May/June 2011, BBC Radio 4 Extra broadcast the Fifth Doctor stories Cobwebs, The Whispering Forest, and Cradle of the Snake. In May/June 2012, these were followed by the Seventh Doctor stories A Thousand Tiny Wings, Survival of the Fittest, Klein's Story and The Architects of History. For the fiftieth anniversary of the show, BBC Radio 4 Extra repeated several stories and broadcast two new stories; Protect and Survive starring Sylvester McCoy and 1963: Fanfare for the Common Men starring Peter Davison. In May 2015, BBC Radio 4 Extra broadcast the first series of Fourth Doctor Adventures starring Tom Baker and Louise Jameson. In 2016, the station broadcast a run of Sixth Doctor adventures: The Crimes of Thomas Brewster (28 May – 4 June), Industrial Evolution (11–18 June) and The Curse of Davros (25 June – 2 July).

== Ranges ==
=== The First Doctor Adventures (2017–present) ===
==== Volume 1 (2017) ====
No.	Serial title	Episode title	Directed by	Written by	Featuring	Released
1	The Destination Wars	"Journey to the Future"	Nicholas Briggs	Matt Fitton	First Doctor, Susan, Ian, Barbara, The Master	December 2017
1	The Destination Wars	"The Father of Invention"	Nicholas Briggs	Matt Fitton	First Doctor, Susan, Ian, Barbara, The Master	December 2017
1	The Destination Wars	"The Destination Wars"	Nicholas Briggs	Matt Fitton	First Doctor, Susan, Ian, Barbara, The Master	December 2017
1	The Destination Wars	"Prisoners of Time"	Nicholas Briggs	Matt Fitton	First Doctor, Susan, Ian, Barbara, The Master	December 2017
2	The Great White Hurricane	"The Coming Storm"	Nicholas Briggs	Guy Adams	First Doctor, Susan, Ian, Barbara	December 2017
2	The Great White Hurricane	"The Frozen City"	Nicholas Briggs	Guy Adams	First Doctor, Susan, Ian, Barbara	December 2017
2	The Great White Hurricane	"The Killer in the Snow"	Nicholas Briggs	Guy Adams	First Doctor, Susan, Ian, Barbara	December 2017
2	The Great White Hurricane	"River of Doom"	Nicholas Briggs	Guy Adams	First Doctor, Susan, Ian, Barbara	December 2017

==== Volume 2 (2018) ====
No.	Serial title	Episode title	Directed by	Written by	Featuring	Released
1	The Invention of Death	"A World Without Fear"	Nicholas Briggs	John Dorney	First Doctor, Susan, Ian, Barbara	July 2018
1	The Invention of Death	"The First"	Nicholas Briggs	John Dorney	First Doctor, Susan, Ian, Barbara	July 2018
1	The Invention of Death	"The Dying Art"	Nicholas Briggs	John Dorney	First Doctor, Susan, Ian, Barbara	July 2018
1	The Invention of Death	"The Invention of Life"	Nicholas Briggs	John Dorney	First Doctor, Susan, Ian, Barbara	July 2018
2	The Barbarians and the Samurai	"The Forbidden Land"	Nicholas Briggs	Andrew Smith	First Doctor, Susan, Ian, Barbara	July 2018
2	The Barbarians and the Samurai	"Barbarians Among Us"	Nicholas Briggs	Andrew Smith	First Doctor, Susan, Ian, Barbara	July 2018
2	The Barbarians and the Samurai	"Power Play"	Nicholas Briggs	Andrew Smith	First Doctor, Susan, Ian, Barbara	July 2018
2	The Barbarians and the Samurai	"Fall of the Samurai"	Nicholas Briggs	Andrew Smith	First Doctor, Susan, Ian, Barbara	July 2018

==== Volume 3 (2019) ====
No.	Serial title	Episode title	Directed by	Written by	Featuring	Released
1	The Phoenicians	"The Purple and the Gold"	Ken Bentley	Marc Platt	First Doctor, Susan, Ian, Barbara	January 2019
1	The Phoenicians	"The Hireling"	Ken Bentley	Marc Platt	First Doctor, Susan, Ian, Barbara	January 2019
1	The Phoenicians	"Legends and Lies"	Ken Bentley	Marc Platt	First Doctor, Susan, Ian, Barbara	January 2019
1	The Phoenicians	"The Bull's Hide"	Ken Bentley	Marc Platt	First Doctor, Susan, Ian, Barbara	January 2019
2	Tick-Tock World	"The Graveyard World"	Ken Bentley	Guy Adams	First Doctor, Susan, Ian, Barbara, Old Susan	January 2019
2	Tick-Tock World	"The Time Ship"	Ken Bentley	Guy Adams	First Doctor, Susan, Ian, Barbara, Old Susan	January 2019
2	Tick-Tock World	"Death in Time"	Ken Bentley	Guy Adams	First Doctor, Susan, Ian, Barbara, Old Susan	January 2019
2	Tick-Tock World	"Feast of the Xesto"	Ken Bentley	Guy Adams	First Doctor, Susan, Ian, Barbara, Old Susan	January 2019

==== Volume 4 (2020) ====
No.	Serial title	Episode title	Directed by	Written by	Featuring	Released
1	Return to Skaro	"The Towers of Skaro"	Ken Bentley	Andrew Smith	First Doctor, Susan, Ian, Barbara, Daleks, Thals	March 2020
1	Return to Skaro	"The Hidden Enemy"	Ken Bentley	Andrew Smith	First Doctor, Susan, Ian, Barbara, Daleks, Thals	March 2020
1	Return to Skaro	"Friend or Foe?"	Ken Bentley	Andrew Smith	First Doctor, Susan, Ian, Barbara, Daleks, Thals	March 2020
1	Return to Skaro	"Death to the Thals!"	Ken Bentley	Andrew Smith	First Doctor, Susan, Ian, Barbara, Daleks, Thals	March 2020
2	Last of the Romanovs	"The Shattered Pane"	Ken Bentley	Jonathan Barnes	First Doctor, Susan, Ian, Barbara	March 2020
2	Last of the Romanovs	"The House of Special Purpose"	Ken Bentley	Jonathan Barnes	First Doctor, Susan, Ian, Barbara	March 2020
2	Last of the Romanovs	"The Execution Order"	Ken Bentley	Jonathan Barnes	First Doctor, Susan, Ian, Barbara	March 2020
2	Last of the Romanovs	"The Waiting Cellar"	Ken Bentley	Jonathan Barnes	First Doctor, Susan, Ian, Barbara	March 2020

==== Volume 5 (2021) ====
No.	Serial title	Episode title	Directed by	Written by	Featuring	Released
1	For the Glory of Urth	"For The Glory of Urth"	Ken Bentley	Guy Adams	First Doctor, Susan, Ian, Barbara	April 2021
1	For the Glory of Urth	"A Place of Angels"	Ken Bentley	Guy Adams	First Doctor, Susan, Ian, Barbara	April 2021
1	For the Glory of Urth	"The Toxicity of Dissent"	Ken Bentley	Guy Adams	First Doctor, Susan, Ian, Barbara	April 2021
1	For the Glory of Urth	"Flowers of Iron"	Ken Bentley	Guy Adams	First Doctor, Susan, Ian, Barbara	April 2021
2	The Hollow Crown	"The Winter of Discontent"	Ken Bentley	Sarah Grochala	First Doctor, Susan, Ian, Barbara	April 2021
2	The Hollow Crown	"The Play's the Thing"	Ken Bentley	Sarah Grochala	First Doctor, Susan, Ian, Barbara	April 2021
2	The Hollow Crown	"The Drums of War"	Ken Bentley	Sarah Grochala	First Doctor, Susan, Ian, Barbara	April 2021
2	The Hollow Crown	"The Hollow Crown"	Ken Bentley	Sarah Grochala	First Doctor, Susan, Ian, Barbara	April 2021

==== Series 1: The Outlaws (2022) ====
No.	Title	Directed by	Written by	Featuring	Released
1	"The Outlaws"	Nicholas Briggs	Lizbeth Myles	First Doctor, Dodo, The Monk	April 2022
2	"The Miniaturist"	Nicholas Briggs	Lizzie Hopley	First Doctor, Dodo	April 2022

==== Series 2: The Demon Song (2023) ====
No.	Title	Directed by	Written by	Featuring	Released
1	"The Demon Song"	Nicholas Briggs	Robert Ayres	First Doctor, Dodo	February 2023
2	"The Incherton Incident"	Nicholas Briggs	Nicholas Briggs	First Doctor, Dodo	February 2023

==== Series 3: Fugitive of the Daleks (2024) ====
No.	Title	Directed by	Written by	Featuring	Released
1	"Part 1"	Nicholas Briggs	Jonathan Morris	First Doctor, Dodo, Vicki, Daleks	January 2024
2	"Part 2"	Nicholas Briggs	Jonathan Morris	First Doctor, Dodo, Vicki, Daleks	January 2024
3	"Part 3"	Nicholas Briggs	Jonathan Morris	First Doctor, Dodo, Vicki, Daleks	January 2024
4	"Part 4"	Nicholas Briggs	Jonathan Morris	First Doctor, Dodo, Vicki, Daleks	January 2024
5	"Part 5"	Nicholas Briggs	Jonathan Morris	First Doctor, Dodo, Vicki, Daleks	January 2024
6	"Part 6"	Nicholas Briggs	Jonathan Morris	First Doctor, Dodo, Vicki, Daleks	January 2024

==== Series 4: The Living Darkness (2025) ====
On the 23 May 2024, Big Finish announced their slate of boxsets for 2025. Nicholas Briggs said: "All our writers, directors, script editors and producers continue to work tirelessly to create exciting new adventures for all our Doctors. The First Doctor continues his strange encounters with past companions, with an absolute corker by Jacqueline Rayner, already recorded and in post-production." The release is set for January 2025.

No.	Title	Directed by	Written by	Featuring	Released
1	"Part 1"	Helen Goldwyn	Jacqueline Rayner	First Doctor, Dodo, Steven Taylor	January 2025
2	"Part 2"	Helen Goldwyn	Jacqueline Rayner	First Doctor, Dodo, Steven Taylor	January 2025
3	"Part 3"	Helen Goldwyn	Jacqueline Rayner	First Doctor, Dodo, Steven Taylor	January 2025
4	"Part 4"	Helen Goldwyn	Jacqueline Rayner	First Doctor, Dodo, Steven Taylor	January 2025
5	"Part 5"	Helen Goldwyn	Jacqueline Rayner	First Doctor, Dodo, Steven Taylor	January 2025
6	"Part 6"	Helen Goldwyn	Jacqueline Rayner	First Doctor, Dodo, Steven Taylor	January 2025

==== Series 5: Beware the City of Illusions (2026) ====
No.	Title	Directed by	Written by	Featuring	Released
1	"Part 1"	Nicholas Briggs	Nicholas Briggs	First Doctor, Dodo, Polly Wright	January 2026
2	"Part 2"	Nicholas Briggs	Nicholas Briggs	First Doctor, Dodo, Polly Wright	January 2026
3	"Part 3"	Nicholas Briggs	Nicholas Briggs	First Doctor, Dodo, Polly Wright	January 2026
4	"Part 4"	Nicholas Briggs	Nicholas Briggs	First Doctor, Dodo, Polly Wright	January 2026
5	"Part 5"	Nicholas Briggs	Nicholas Briggs	First Doctor, Dodo, Polly Wright	January 2026
6	"Part 6"	Nicholas Briggs	Nicholas Briggs	First Doctor, Dodo, Polly Wright	January 2026

=== The Second Doctor Adventures (2022–present) ===
==== Series 1: Beyond War Games (2022) ====
No.	Title	Directed by	Written by	Featuring	Released
1	"The Final Beginning"	Nicholas Briggs	Mark Wright and Nicholas Briggs	Second Doctor, Daleks	July 2022
2	"Wrath of the Ice Warriors"	Nicholas Briggs	Andrew Smith	Second Doctor, Brigadier Lethbridge-Stewart, Ice Warriors	July 2022

==== Series 2: James Robert McCrimmon (2023) ====
No.	Title	Directed by	Written by	Featuring	Released
1	"Jamie"	Nicholas Briggs	Mark Wright	Second Doctor, Jamie McCrimmon	July 2023
2	"The Green Man"	Nicholas Briggs	Paul F Verhoeven	Second Doctor, Jamie McCrimmon	July 2023
3	"The Shroud"	Nicholas Briggs	Bob Ayres	Second Doctor, Jamie McCrimmon	July 2023

==== Series 3: Conspiracy of Raven (2024) ====
No.	Title	Directed by	Written by	Featuring	Released
1	"Kippers"	Nicholas Briggs	Nicholas Briggs	Second Doctor, Jamie, Zoe Herriot	July 2024
2	"Catastrophe Theory"	Nicholas Briggs	Mark Wright	Second Doctor, Jamie, Zoe Herriot	July 2024
3	"The Vanishing Point"	Nicholas Briggs	Mark Wright and Nicholas Briggs	Second Doctor, Jamie, Zoe Herriot	July 2024

==== Series 4: The Potential Daleks (2025) ====
No.	Title	Directed by	Written by	Featuring	Released
1	"Humpty Dumpty"	Nicholas Briggs	Nicholas Briggs	Second Doctor, Jamie, Zoe, Daleks	December 2025
2	"Secret of the Daleks"	Nicholas Briggs	Mark Wright	Second Doctor, Jamie, Zoe, Daleks	December 2025
3	"War of the Morai"	Nicholas Briggs	Mark Wright and Nicholas Briggs	Second Doctor, Jamie, Zoe, Daleks	December 2025

==== Series 5: The Haunted Windmill (2026) ====
No.	Title	Directed by	Written by	Featuring	Released
1	"The Haunted Windmill"	Nicholas Briggs	Alan Barnes	Second Doctor, Jamie, Zoe	August 2026
2	"The Crystal Ship"	Nicholas Briggs	Alan Barnes	Second Doctor, Jamie, Zoe	August 2026
3	"The Hungry Glass"	Nicholas Briggs	Alan Barnes	Second Doctor, Jamie, Zoe	August 2026

=== The Third Doctor Adventures (2015–present) ===
==== Volume 1 (2015) ====
No.	Title	Directed by	Written by	Featuring	Released
1	"Prisoners of the Lake"	Nicholas Briggs	Justin Richards	Third Doctor, Jo Grant, Mike Yates	September 2015
2	"The Havoc of Empires"	Nicholas Briggs	Andy Lane	Third Doctor, Jo Grant, Mike Yates	September 2015

==== Volume 2 (2016) ====
No.	Title	Directed by	Written by	Featuring	Released
1	"The Transcendence of Ephros"	Ken Bentley	Guy Adams	Third Doctor, Jo	November 2016
2	"The Hidden Realm"	Ken Bentley	David Llewellyn	Third Doctor, Jo	November 2016

==== Volume 3 (2017) ====
No.	Title	Directed by	Written by	Featuring	Released
1	"The Conquest of Far"	Nicholas Briggs	Nicholas Briggs	Third Doctor, Jo, Daleks	August 2017
2	"Storm of the Horofax"	Nicholas Briggs	Andrew Smith	Third Doctor, Jo	August 2017

==== Volume 4 (2018) ====
No.	Title	Directed by	Written by	Featuring	Released
1	"The Rise of the New Humans"	Nicholas Briggs	Guy Adams	Third Doctor, Jo, The Monk	March 2018
2	"The Tyrants of Logic"	Nicholas Briggs	Marc Platt	Third Doctor, Jo, Cybermen	March 2018

==== Volume 5 (2019) ====
No.	Title	Directed by	Written by	Featuring	Released
1	"Primord"	Nicholas Briggs	John Dorney	Third Doctor, Jo, Liz Shaw, Brigadier Lethbridge-Stewart, Primords	May 2019
2	"The Scream of Ghosts"	Nicholas Briggs	Guy Adams	Third Doctor, Jo, The Brigadier, Sergeant Benton, Vardans	May 2019

==== Volume 6 (2020) ====
No.	Title	Directed by	Written by	Featuring	Released
1	"Poison of the Daleks"	Nicholas Briggs	Guy Adams	Third Doctor, Jo, The Brigadier, Benton, Daleks	May 2020
2	"Operation Hellfire"	Nicholas Briggs	Jonathan Barnes	Third Doctor, Jo, Winston Churchill	May 2020

==== Volume 7 (2021) ====
No.	Title	Directed by	Written by	Featuring	Released
1	"The Unzal Incursion"	Nicholas Briggs	Mark Wright	Third Doctor, Liz, The Brigadier	May 2021
2	"The Gulf"	Nicholas Briggs	Tim Foley	Third Doctor, Sarah Jane Smith	May 2021

==== Volume 8 (2021) ====
No.	Title	Directed by	Written by	Featuring	Released
1	"Conspiracy in Space"	Nicholas Briggs	Alan Barnes	Third Doctor, Jo, Draconians	October 2021
2	"The Devil's Hoofprints"	Nicholas Briggs	Robert Valentine	Third Doctor, Sarah, The Brigadier	October 2021

==== The Annihilators (2022) ====
No.	Title	Directed by	Written by	Featuring	Released
1	"Episode One"	Nicholas Briggs	Nicholas Briggs	Third Doctor, Liz, The Brigadier, Second Doctor, Jamie McCrimmon	February 2022
2	"Episode Two"	Nicholas Briggs	Nicholas Briggs	Third Doctor, Liz, The Brigadier, Second Doctor, Jamie McCrimmon	February 2022
3	"Episode Three"	Nicholas Briggs	Nicholas Briggs	Third Doctor, Liz, The Brigadier, Second Doctor, Jamie McCrimmon	February 2022
4	"Episode Four"	Nicholas Briggs	Nicholas Briggs	Third Doctor, Liz, The Brigadier, Second Doctor, Jamie McCrimmon	February 2022
5	"Episode Five"	Nicholas Briggs	Nicholas Briggs	Third Doctor, Liz, The Brigadier, Second Doctor, Jamie McCrimmon	February 2022
6	"Episode Six"	Nicholas Briggs	Nicholas Briggs	Third Doctor, Liz, The Brigadier, Second Doctor, Jamie McCrimmon	February 2022
7	"Episode Seven"	Nicholas Briggs	Nicholas Briggs	Third Doctor, Liz, The Brigadier, Second Doctor, Jamie McCrimmon	February 2022

==== Kaleidoscope (2022) ====
No.	Title	Directed by	Written by	Featuring	Released
1	"Part One"	Nicholas Briggs	Alan Barnes	Third Doctor, Sarah, The Brigadier, Kaleidoscope	October 2022
2	"Part Two"	Nicholas Briggs	Alan Barnes	Third Doctor, Sarah, The Brigadier, Kaleidoscope	October 2022
3	"Part Three"	Nicholas Briggs	Alan Barnes	Third Doctor, Sarah, The Brigadier, Kaleidoscope	October 2022
4	"Part Four"	Nicholas Briggs	Alan Barnes	Third Doctor, Sarah, The Brigadier, Kaleidoscope	October 2022
5	"Part Five"	Nicholas Briggs	Alan Barnes	Third Doctor, Sarah, The Brigadier, Kaleidoscope	October 2022
6	"Part Six"	Nicholas Briggs	Alan Barnes	Third Doctor, Sarah, The Brigadier, Kaleidoscope	October 2022

==== The Return of Jo Jones (2023) ====
No.	Title	Directed by	Written by	Featuring	Released
1	"Supernature"	Nicholas Briggs	Matt Fitton	Third Doctor, Jo	February 2023
2	"The Conservitors"	Nicholas Briggs	Felicia Baker	Third Doctor, Jo	February 2023
3	"The Iron Shore"	Nicholas Briggs	Lizzie Hopley	Third Doctor, Jo	February 2023

==== Intelligence for War (2023) ====
No.	Title	Directed by	Written by	Featuring	Released
1	"Part One"	Nicholas Briggs	Eddie Robson	Third Doctor, Liz, The Brigadier	October 2023
2	"Part Two"	Nicholas Briggs	Eddie Robson	Third Doctor, Liz, The Brigadier	October 2023
3	"Part Three"	Nicholas Briggs	Eddie Robson	Third Doctor, Liz, The Brigadier	October 2023
4	"Part Four"	Nicholas Briggs	Eddie Robson	Third Doctor, Liz, The Brigadier	October 2023
5	"Part Five"	Nicholas Briggs	Eddie Robson	Third Doctor, Liz, The Brigadier	October 2023
6	"Part Six"	Nicholas Briggs	Eddie Robson	Third Doctor, Liz, The Brigadier	October 2023
7	"Part Seven"	Nicholas Briggs	Eddie Robson	Third Doctor, Liz, The Brigadier	October 2023

==== Revolution in Space (2024) ====
No.	Title	Directed by	Written by	Featuring	Released
1	"Part One"	Nicholas Briggs	Jonathan Morris	Third Doctor, Sarah	February 2024
2	"Part Two"	Nicholas Briggs	Jonathan Morris	Third Doctor, Sarah	February 2024
3	"Part Three"	Nicholas Briggs	Jonathan Morris	Third Doctor, Sarah	February 2024
4	"Part Four"	Nicholas Briggs	Jonathan Morris	Third Doctor, Sarah	February 2024
5	"Part Five"	Nicholas Briggs	Jonathan Morris	Third Doctor, Sarah	February 2024
6	"Part Six"	Nicholas Briggs	Jonathan Morris	Third Doctor, Sarah	February 2024

==== The Quintessence (2024) ====
No.	Title	Directed by	Written by	Featuring	Released
1	"Part One"	Nicholas Briggs	Stewart Pringle & Lauren Mooney	Third Doctor, Jo, Cybermen	October 2024
2	"Part Two"	Nicholas Briggs	Stewart Pringle & Lauren Mooney	Third Doctor, Jo, Cybermen	October 2024
3	"Part Three"	Nicholas Briggs	Stewart Pringle & Lauren Mooney	Third Doctor, Jo, Cybermen	October 2024
4	"Part Four"	Nicholas Briggs	Stewart Pringle & Lauren Mooney	Third Doctor, Jo, Cybermen	October 2024
5	"Part Five"	Nicholas Briggs	Stewart Pringle & Lauren Mooney	Third Doctor, Jo, Cybermen	October 2024
6	"Part Six"	Nicholas Briggs	Stewart Pringle & Lauren Mooney	Third Doctor, Jo, Cybermen	October 2024

==== Doctor Who and the Brain Drain (2025) ====
No.	Title	Directed by	Written by	Featuring	Released
1	"Part One"	Nicholas Briggs	Richard James & Nicholas Briggs	Third Doctor, Liz, The Brigadier	February 2025
2	"Part Two"	Nicholas Briggs	Richard James & Nicholas Briggs	Third Doctor, Liz, The Brigadier	February 2025
3	"Part Three"	Nicholas Briggs	Richard James & Nicholas Briggs	Third Doctor, Liz, The Brigadier	February 2025
4	"Part Four"	Nicholas Briggs	Richard James & Nicholas Briggs	Third Doctor, Liz, The Brigadier	February 2025
5	"Part Five"	Nicholas Briggs	Richard James & Nicholas Briggs	Third Doctor, Liz, The Brigadier	February 2025
6	"Part Six"	Nicholas Briggs	Richard James & Nicholas Briggs	Third Doctor, Liz, The Brigadier	February 2025

==== Operation: Vengeance (2025) ====
No.	Title	Directed by	Written by	Featuring	Released
1	"Part One"	Nicholas Briggs	Nicholas Briggs & Tim Treloar	Third Doctor, Sarah Jane, The Brigadier, Jo	October 2025
2	"Part Two"	Nicholas Briggs	Nicholas Briggs & Tim Treloar	Third Doctor, Sarah Jane, The Brigadier, Jo	October 2025
3	"Part Three"	Nicholas Briggs	Nicholas Briggs & Tim Treloar	Third Doctor, Sarah Jane, The Brigadier, Jo	October 2025
4	"Part Four"	Nicholas Briggs	Nicholas Briggs & Tim Treloar	Third Doctor, Sarah Jane, The Brigadier, Jo	October 2025
5	"Part Five"	Nicholas Briggs	Nicholas Briggs & Tim Treloar	Third Doctor, Sarah Jane, The Brigadier, Jo	October 2025
6	"Part Six"	Nicholas Briggs	Nicholas Briggs & Tim Treloar	Third Doctor, Sarah Jane, The Brigadier, Jo	October 2025

==== The Imposters (2026) ====
No.	Title	Directed by	Written by	Featuring	Released
1	"Part One"	Nicholas Briggs	Alan Barnes	Third Doctor, Sarah Jane, The Brigadier, Liz Shaw	February 2026
2	"Part Two"	Nicholas Briggs	Alan Barnes	Third Doctor, Sarah Jane, The Brigadier, Liz Shaw	February 2026
3	"Part Three"	Nicholas Briggs	Alan Barnes	Third Doctor, Sarah Jane, The Brigadier, Liz Shaw	February 2026
4	"Part Four"	Nicholas Briggs	Alan Barnes	Third Doctor, Sarah Jane, The Brigadier, Liz Shaw	February 2026
5	"Part Five"	Nicholas Briggs	Alan Barnes	Third Doctor, Sarah Jane, The Brigadier, Liz Shaw	February 2026
6	"Part Six"	Nicholas Briggs	Alan Barnes	Third Doctor, Sarah Jane, The Brigadier, Liz Shaw	February 2026

==== The Planet Killers (2026) ====
No.	Title	Directed by	Written by	Featuring	Released
The Beasts of Sakhalin Island
1	"Part One"	Nicholas Briggs	Jez Fielder	Third Doctor, Jo	October 2026
2	"Part Two"	Nicholas Briggs	Jez Fielder	Third Doctor, Jo	October 2026
3	"Part Three"	Nicholas Briggs	Jez Fielder	Third Doctor, Jo	October 2026
4	"Part Four"	Nicholas Briggs	Jez Fielder	Third Doctor, Jo	October 2026
The Planet Killers
5	"Part One"	Barnaby Edwards	Andrew Smith	Third Doctor, Jo, Daleks	October 2026
6	"Part Two"	Barnaby Edwards	Andrew Smith	Third Doctor, Jo, Daleks	October 2026

=== The Fourth Doctor Adventures (2012–present) ===
In 2012, Big Finish began a range of ongoing dramas featuring the Fourth Doctor, as portrayed by Tom Baker. Baker had previously declined to feature in Big Finish releases, but after recording The Fourth Doctor Box Set had been encouraged to participate.

==== Series 1 (2012) ====
No.	Title	Directed by	Written by	Featuring	Released
1	"Destination: Nerva"	Nicholas Briggs	Nicholas Briggs	Fourth Doctor, Leela	January 2012
2	"The Renaissance Man"	Ken Bentley	Justin Richards	Fourth Doctor, Leela	February 2012
3	"The Wrath of the Iceni"	Ken Bentley	John Dorney	Fourth Doctor, Leela	March 2012
4	"Energy of the Daleks"	Nicholas Briggs	Nicholas Briggs	Fourth Doctor, Leela, Daleks	April 2012
5	"Trail of the White Worm (Part 1)"	Ken Bentley	Alan Barnes	Fourth Doctor, Leela, the Master	May 2012
6	"The Oseidon Adventure (Part 2)"	Ken Bentley	Alan Barnes	Fourth Doctor, Leela, the Master, Kraals	June 2012

==== Special (2012) ====
No.	Title	Directed by	Written by	Featuring	Released
–	"Night of the Stormcrow"	Nicholas Briggs	Marc Platt	Fourth Doctor, Leela	December 2012

==== Series 2 (2013) ====
No.	Title	Directed by	Written by	Featuring	Released
1	"The Auntie Matter"	Ken Bentley	Jonathan Morris	Fourth Doctor, Romana I, K9	January 2013
2	"The Sands of Life (Part 1)"	Nicholas Briggs	Nicholas Briggs	Fourth Doctor, Romana I, K9, Laan, Cuthbert	February 2013
3	"War Against the Laan (Part 2)"	Nicholas Briggs	Nicholas Briggs	Fourth Doctor, Romana I, K9, Laan, Cuthbert	March 2013
4	"The Justice of Jalxar"	Ken Bentley	John Dorney	Fourth Doctor, Romana I, Jago, Litefoot	March 2013
5	"Phantoms of the Deep"	Ken Bentley	Jonathan Morris	Fourth Doctor, Romana I, K9	May 2013
6	"The Dalek Contract (Part 1)"	Nicholas Briggs	Nicholas Briggs	Fourth Doctor, Romana I, K9, Daleks, Cuthbert	June 2013
7	"The Final Phase (Part 2)"	Nicholas Briggs	Nicholas Briggs	Fourth Doctor, Romana I, K9, Daleks, Cuthbert	July 2013

==== Series 3 (2014) ====
No.	Title	Directed by	Written by	Featuring	Released
1	"The King of Sontar"	Nicholas Briggs	John Dorney	Fourth Doctor, Leela, Sontarans	January 2014
2	"White Ghosts"	Nicholas Briggs	Alan Barnes	Fourth Doctor, Leela	February 2014
3	"The Crooked Man"	Nicholas Briggs	John Dorney	Fourth Doctor, Leela	March 2014
4	"The Evil One"	Nicholas Briggs	Nicholas Briggs	Fourth Doctor, Leela, the Master	April 2014
5	"Last of the Colophon"	Nicholas Briggs	Jonathan Morris	Fourth Doctor, Leela	May 2014
6	"Destroy the Infinite"	Nicholas Briggs	Nicholas Briggs	Fourth Doctor, Leela, the Eminence	June 2014
7	"The Abandoned"	Ken Bentley	Louise Jameson; Nigel Fairs	Fourth Doctor, Leela	July 2014
8	"Zygon Hunt"	Nicholas Briggs	Nicholas Briggs	Fourth Doctor, Leela, Zygons	August 2014

==== Series 4 (2015) ====
No.	Title	Directed by	Written by	Featuring	Released
1	"The Exxilons"	Nicholas Briggs	Nicholas Briggs	Fourth Doctor, Leela, K9, Exxilons	January 2015
2	"The Darkness of Glass"	Nicholas Briggs	Justin Richards	Fourth Doctor, Leela	February 2015
3	"Requiem for the Rocket Men (Part 1)"	Nicholas Briggs	John Dorney	Fourth Doctor, Leela, K9, the Master, the Rocket Men	March 2015
4	"Death Match (Part 2)"	Nicholas Briggs	Matt Fitton	Fourth Doctor, Leela, K9, the Master	April 2015
5	"Suburban Hell"	Nicholas Briggs	Alan Barnes	Fourth Doctor, Leela	May 2015
6	"The Cloisters of Terror"	Nicholas Briggs	Jonathan Morris	Fourth Doctor, Leela	June 2015
7	"The Fate of Krelos (Part 1)"	Nicholas Briggs	Nicholas Briggs	Fourth Doctor, Leela, K9	July 2015
8	"Return to Telos (Part 2)"	Nicholas Briggs	Nicholas Briggs	Fourth Doctor, Leela, K9, Cybermen, Jamie McCrimmon	August 2015

==== Series 5 (2016) ====
No.	Title	Directed by	Written by	Featuring	Released
1	"Wave of Destruction"	Nicholas Briggs	Justin Richards	Fourth Doctor, Romana II, K9	January 2016
2	"The Labyrinth of Buda Castle"	Nicholas Briggs	Eddie Robson	Fourth Doctor, Romana II	February 2016
3	"The Paradox Planet (Part 1)"	Nicholas Briggs	Jonathan Morris	Fourth Doctor, Romana II, K9	March 2016
4	"Legacy of Death (Part 2)"	Ken Bentley	Jonathan Morris	Fourth Doctor, Romana II, K9	April 2016
5	"Gallery of Ghouls"	Ken Bentley	Alan Barnes	Fourth Doctor, Romana II	May 2016
6	"The Trouble with Drax"	Nicholas Briggs	John Dorney	Fourth Doctor, Romana II, K9, Drax	June 2016
7	"The Pursuit of History (Part 1)"	Nicholas Briggs	Nicholas Briggs	Fourth Doctor, Romana II, K9, the Black Guardian, Cuthbert, Laan	July 2016
8	"Casualties of Time (Part 2)"	Nicholas Briggs	Nicholas Briggs	Fourth Doctor, Romana II, K9, the Black Guardian, Cuthbert, Laan	August 2016

==== Series 6 (2017) ====
No.	Title	Directed by	Written by	Featuring	Released
1	"The Beast of Kravenos"	Nicholas Briggs	Justin Richards	Fourth Doctor, Romana II, K9, Jago & Litefoot	January 2017
2	"The Eternal Battle"	Nicholas Briggs	Cavan Scott and Mark Wright	Fourth Doctor, Romana II, K9, Sontarans	February 2017
3	"The Silent Scream"	Nicholas Briggs	James Goss	Fourth Doctor, Romana II, K9, Celluloids	March 2017
4	"Dethras"	Nicholas Briggs	Adrian Poynton	Fourth Doctor, Romana II, Flague	April 2017
5	"The Haunting of Malkin Place"	Nicholas Briggs	Phil Mulryne	Fourth Doctor, Romana II	May 2017
6	"Subterranea"	Nicholas Briggs	Jonathan Morris	Fourth Doctor, Romana II, the Silex	June 2017
7	"The Movellan Grave"	Nicholas Briggs	Andrew Smith	Fourth Doctor, Romana II, K9, Movellans	July 2017
8	"The Skin of the Sleek (Part 1)"	Ken Bentley	Marc Platt	Fourth Doctor, Romana II, K9	August 2017
9	"The Thief Who Stole Time (Part 2)"	Ken Bentley	Marc Platt	Fourth Doctor, Romana II, K9	September 2017

==== Series 7 (2018) ====
No.	Title	Directed by	Written by	Featuring	Released
1	"The Sons of Kaldor"	Nicholas Briggs	Andrew Smith	Fourth Doctor, Leela, Voc Robots	January 2018
2	"The Crowmarsh Experiment"	Nicholas Briggs	David Llewellyn	Fourth Doctor, Leela	January 2018
3	"The Mind Runners (Part 1)"	Nicholas Briggs	John Dorney	Fourth Doctor, Leela, K9	January 2018
4	"The Demon Rises (Part 2)"	Nicholas Briggs	John Dorney	Fourth Doctor, Leela, K9	January 2018
5	"The Shadow of London"	Nicholas Briggs	Justin Richards	Fourth Doctor, Leela	May 2018
6	"The Bad Penny"	Nicholas Briggs	Dan Starkey	Fourth Doctor, Leela, the Haodean	May 2018
7	"Kill the Doctor! (Part 1)"	Nicholas Briggs	Guy Adams	Fourth Doctor, Leela, Sutekh	May 2018
8	"The Age of Sutekh (Part 2)"	Nicholas Briggs	Guy Adams	Fourth Doctor, Leela, Sutekh	May 2018

==== Series 8 (2019) ====
No.	Title	Directed by	Written by	Featuring	Released
1	"The Sinestran Kill"	Nicholas Briggs	Andrew Smith	Fourth Doctor, Ann, Sinestrans	January 2019
2	"Planet of the Drashigs"	Nicholas Briggs	Phil Mulryne	Fourth Doctor, Ann, Drashigs	January 2019
3	"The Enchantress of Numbers"	Nicholas Briggs	Simon Barnard and Paul Morris	Fourth Doctor, Ann, K9, Ada Lovelace, Lord Byron	January 2019
4	"The False Guardian (Part 1)"	Nicholas Briggs	Guy Adams	Fourth Doctor, Ann, K9, Mavic Chen	January 2019
5	"Time's Assassin (Part 2)"	Nicholas Briggs	Guy Adams	Fourth Doctor, Ann, K9	February 2019
6	"Fever Island"	Nicholas Briggs	Jonathan Barnes	Fourth Doctor, Ann, K9, Jason Vane	February 2019
7	"The Perfect Prisoners (Part 1)"	Nicholas Briggs	John Dorney	Fourth Doctor, Ann, K9	February 2019
8	"The Perfect Prisoners (Part 2)"	Nicholas Briggs	John Dorney	Fourth Doctor, Ann, K9	February 2019

==== Series 9 (2020) ====
No.	Title	Directed by	Written by	Featuring	Released
1	"Purgatory 12"	Nicholas Briggs	Marc Platt	Fourth Doctor, Romana II, Adric, K9	January 2020
2	"Chase the Night"	Nicholas Briggs	Jonathan Morris	Fourth Doctor, Romana II, Adric, K9	January 2020
3	"The Planet of Witches"	Ken Bentley	Alan Barnes	Fourth Doctor, Romana II, Adric, K9	February 2020
4	"The Quest of the Engineer"	Nicholas Briggs	Andrew Smith	Fourth Doctor, Romana II, Adric, K9	February 2020

==== Special (2020) ====
No.	Title	Directed by	Written by	Featuring	Released
–	"Shadow of the Sun"	Nicholas Briggs	Robert Valentine	Fourth Doctor, Leela, K9	May 2020

==== Series 10 (2021) ====
No.	Title	Directed by	Written by	Featuring	Released
1	"The World Traders"	Nicholas Briggs	Guy Adams	Fourth Doctor, Leela, Usurians	January 2021
2	"The Day of the Comet"	Nicholas Briggs	Jonathan Morris	Fourth Doctor, Leela	January 2021
3	"The Tribulations of Thadeus Nook"	Nicholas Briggs	Andrew Smith	Fourth Doctor, Leela	February 2021
4	"The Primeval Design"	Nicholas Briggs	Helen Goldwyn	Fourth Doctor, Leela, Mary Anning	February 2021

==== Dalek Universe Prologue (2021) ====
No.	Title	Directed by	Written by	Featuring	Released
–	"The Dalek Protocol"	Nicholas Briggs	Nicholas Briggs	Fourth Doctor, Leela, K9, Anya Kingdom, Mark Seven, Daleks, Exxilons, Bellal	April 2021

==== Series 11 (2022) ====
No.	Title	Directed by	Written by	Featuring	Released
Volume 1: Solo
1	"Blood of the Time Lords"	Nicholas Briggs	Timothy X Atack	Fourth Doctor, The Master	March 2022
2	"The Ravencliff Witch"	Nicholas Briggs	David Llewellyn	Fourth Doctor, Margaret	March 2022
Volume 2: The Nine
3	"The Dreams of Avarice"	Nicholas Briggs	Guy Adams	Fourth Doctor, The Nine	June 2022
4	"Shellshock"	Nicholas Briggs	Simon Barnard and Paul Morris	Fourth Doctor	June 2022
5	"Peake Season"	Jamie Anderson	Lizbeth Myles	Fourth Doctor, Mervyn Peake	June 2022

==== Series 12 (2023) ====
No.	Title	Directed by	Written by	Featuring	Released
Volume 1: New Frontiers
1	"Ice Heist!"	Nicholas Briggs	Guy Adams	Fourth Doctor, Leela, Margaret, The Ice Warriors	March 2023
2	"Antillia the Lost"	Nicholas Briggs	Phil Mulryne	Fourth Doctor, Leela, Margaret	March 2023
Volume 2: Angels and Demons
3	"The Wizard of Time"	Nicholas Briggs	Roy Gill	Fourth Doctor, Leela, Margaret	June 2023
4	"The Friendly Invasion"	Nicholas Briggs	Chris Chapman	Fourth Doctor, Leela, Margaret	June 2023
5	"Stone Cold"	Nicholas Briggs	Roland Moore	Fourth Doctor, Leela, Margaret, Weeping Angels	June 2023
6	"The Ghost of Margaret"	Nicholas Briggs	Tim Foley	Fourth Doctor, Leela, Margaret	June 2023

==== Series 13 (2024) ====
No.	Title	Directed by	Written by	Featuring	Released
Volume 1: Storm of the Sea Devils
1	"The Storm of the Sea Devils"	Nicholas Briggs	David K Barnes	Fourth Doctor, Harry Sullivan, Naomi Cross, UNIT, Sea Devils	March 2024
2	"Worlds Beyond"	Nicholas Briggs	Robert Khan and Tom Salinsky	Fourth Doctor, Harry, Naomi, Alan Turing	March 2024
Volume 2: Metamorphosis
3	"Matryoshka"	Helen Goldwyn	Aurora Fearnley	Fourth Doctor, Harry, Naomi, The Toymaker	June 2024
4	"The Caged Assassin"	Nicholas Briggs	Matthew Sweet	Fourth Doctor, Harry, Naomi	June 2024
5	"Metamorphosis"	Jamie Anderson	Lisa McMullin	Fourth Doctor, Harry, Naomi, The Master	June 2024
Volume 3: Dominant Species
6	"The Face in the Storm"	Nicholas Briggs	Sarah Grochala	Fourth Doctor, Harry, Naomi, Dominators, Quarks	September 2024
7	"Dominant Species"	Nicholas Briggs	John Dorney	Fourth Doctor, Harry, Naomi, Dominators, Quarks	September 2024

==== Special (2024) ====
No.	Title	Directed by	Written by	Featuring	Released
–	"The Curse of Time"	Helen Goldwyn	Jonathan Morris	Fourth Doctor, Sarah Jane Smith, Harry Sullivan	December 2024

==== Series 14 (2025) ====
No.	Title	Directed by	Written by	Featuring	Released
Volume 1: The Hellwood Inheritance
1	"The Hellwood Inheritance"	Jamie Anderson	Alan Barnes	Fourth Doctor, Leela	March 2025
2	"The Memory Thieves"	Jamie Anderson	Phil Mulryne	Fourth Doctor, Leela	March 2025
Volume 2: The Ruins of Kaerula
3	"The Remains of Kaerula"	Jamie Anderson and Ken Bentley	Phil Mulryne	Fourth Doctor, Leela, K9	June 2025
4	"The Ruins of Kaerula"	Helen Goldwyn	Phil Mulryne	Fourth Doctor, Leela, K9	June 2025
5	"Cry of the Banshee"	Nicholas Briggs	Tim Foley	Fourth Doctor, Leela, K9, The Brigadier	June 2025
Volume 3: The Last Queen of the Nile
6	"Conspiracy of Silence"	Nicholas Briggs	Jonathan Morris	Fourth Doctor, Leela, The Brigadier, The Silence	September 2025
7	"The Last Queen of the Nile"	Nicholas Briggs	David K. Barnes	Fourth Doctor, Leela, K9, Mark Antony, Cleopatra	September 2025

==== Series 15 (2026) ====
No.	Title	Directed by	Written by	Featuring	Released
Volume 1: The Ministry of Death
1	"The Ministry of Death"	Jamie Anderson and Ken Bentley	Robert Valentine	Fourth Doctor, Sarah Jane, The Brigadier	March 2026
2	"The Inhuman Empire"	Jamie Anderson and Ken Bentley	Phil Mulryne	Fourth Doctor, Sarah Jane, Harry Sullivan	March 2026
Volume 2: Lethal Progress
3	"Green and Pleasant Planet"	Helen Goldwyn	Tim Foley	Fourth Doctor, Sarah Jane	June 2026
4	"The Continuum"	Helen Goldwyn	John Dorney	Fourth Doctor, Sarah Jane	June 2026
5	"The Audience"	Helen Goldwyn	Lizzie Hopley	Fourth Doctor, Sarah Jane	June 2026
Volume 3: A New Occupation
6	"Daughter of Destruction"	Helen Goldwyn	Katharine Armitage	Fourth Doctor, Sarah Jane	September 2026
7	"A New Occupation"	Helen Goldwyn	Helen Goldwyn	Fourth Doctor, Sarah Jane, Harry Sullivan	September 2026

=== The Fifth Doctor Adventures (2003–present) ===
==== Specials (2003–2008) ====
No.	Title	Directed by	Written by	Featuring	Released
1	"No Place Like Home"	Gary Russell	Iain McLaughlin	Fifth Doctor, Erimem, Shayde	January 2003
2	"Cuddlesome"	Barnaby Edwards	Nigel Fairs	Fifth Doctor	March 2008
3	"Return to the Web Planet"	Barnaby Edwards	Daniel O'Mahony	Fifth Doctor, Nyssa, Zarbi, Menoptera	December 2008

==== Volume 1 (2014) ====
No.	Title	Directed by	Written by	Featuring	Released
1	"Psychodrome"	Ken Bentley	Jonathan Morris	Fifth Doctor, Adric, Nyssa, Tegan	August 2014
2	"Iterations of I"	Ken Bentley	John Dorney	Fifth Doctor, Adric, Nyssa, Tegan	August 2014

==== Wicked Sisters (2020) ====
No.	Title	Directed by	Written by	Featuring	Released
1	"The Garden of Storms"	Lisa Bowerman	Simon Guerrier	Fifth Doctor, Leela, Abby, Zara	November 2020
2	"The Moonrakers"	Lisa Bowerman	Simon Guerrier	Fifth Doctor, Leela, Abby, Zara	November 2020
3	"The People Made of Smoke"	Lisa Bowerman	Simon Guerrier	Fifth Doctor, Leela, Abby, Zara	November 2020

==== The Lost Resort and Other Stories (2021) ====
No.	Title	Directed by	Written by	Featuring	Released
1	"The Lost Resort"	Scott Handcock	AK Benedict	Fifth Doctor, Nyssa, Tegan, Marc, Adric	September 2021
2	"The Perils of Nellie Bly"	Scott Handcock	Sarah Ward	Fifth Doctor, Nyssa, Tegan, Marc	September 2021
3	"Nightmare of the Daleks"	Samuel Clemens	Martyn Waites	Fifth Doctor, Nyssa, Tegan, Marc, Daleks	September 2021

==== Forty (2022) ====
No.	Title	Directed by	Written by	Featuring	Released
Volume 1
1	"Secrets of Telos"	Ken Bentley	Matt Fitton	Fifth Doctor, Nyssa, Tegan, Cybermen	January 2022
2	"God of War"	Ken Bentley	Sarah Grochala	Fifth Doctor, Adric, Nyssa, Tegan, Ice Warriors	January 2022
–	"Interlude: I, Kamelion"	Read by: Dan Starkey	Dominic Martin	Fifth Doctor, Turlough, Kamelion	January 2022
Volume 2
3	"The Auton Infinity"	Ken Bentley	Tim Foley	Fifth Doctor, Tegan, Turlough, Kamelion, The Brigadier, Autons, The Master	September 2022

==== Conflicts of Interest (2023) ====
No.	Title	Directed by	Written by	Featuring	Released
1	"Friendly Fire"	Ken Bentley	John Dorney	Fifth Doctor, Nyssa, Tegan	April 2023
2	"The Edge of the War"	Ken Bentley	Jonathan Barnes	Fifth Doctor, Nyssa, Tegan	April 2023
–	"Interlude: Gobbledegook"	Read by: Dan Starkey	Frazer Lee	Fifth Doctor	April 2023

==== In The Night (2023) ====
No.	Title	Directed by	Written by	Featuring	Released
1	"Pursuit of the Nightjar"	Ken Bentley	Tim Foley	Fifth Doctor, Nyssa, Tegan	September 2023
2	"Resistor"	Ken Bentley	Sarah Grochala	Fifth Doctor, Nyssa, Tegan	September 2023

==== The Dream Team (2024) ====
No.	Title	Directed by	Written by	Featuring	Released
1	"The Merfolk Murders"	Ken Bentley	Tim Foley	Fifth Doctor, Nyssa, Tegan, Adric	April 2024
2	"Dream Team"	Ken Bentley	Lizzie Hopley	Fifth Doctor, Nyssa, Tegan, Adric	April 2024
–	"Interlude: Meanwhile, Turlough"	Read by: Dan Starkey	Jonathan Blum	Fifth Doctor, Tegan, Turlough	April 2024

==== The Great Beyond (2024) ====
A second boxset is scheduled for release in September 2024. Big Finish's Creative Director Nicholas Briggs described them as "...really imaginative, celebratory adventures that feel like Classic Doctor Who turned right up to eleven, in the very best of ways".

No.	Title	Directed by	Written by	Featuring	Released
1	"Part 1"	Ken Bentley	James Kettle	Fifth Doctor, Nyssa, Tegan, Adric	September 2024
2	"Part 2"	Ken Bentley	James Kettle	Fifth Doctor, Nyssa, Tegan, Adric	September 2024
3	"Part 3"	Ken Bentley	James Kettle	Fifth Doctor, Nyssa, Tegan, Adric	September 2024
4	"Part 4"	Ken Bentley	James Kettle	Fifth Doctor, Nyssa, Tegan, Adric	September 2024
5	"Part 5"	Ken Bentley	James Kettle	Fifth Doctor, Nyssa, Tegan, Adric	September 2024
6	"Part 6"	Ken Bentley	James Kettle	Fifth Doctor, Nyssa, Tegan, Adric	September 2024

==== Hooklight (2025) ====
On 23 May 2024, Big Finish announced their slate of boxsets for 2025. Senior Producer John Ainsworth said "...in 2025, Peter Davison stars in a 12-part Fifth Doctor story for the first time ever. It's an epic featuring new worlds, new creatures and a searing light that could burn everything to dust." The two boxsets are scheduled for release in April and May 2025, respectively.

No.	Title	Directed by	Written by	Featuring	Released
Part 1
1	"Part 1"	Ken Bentley	Tim Foley	Fifth Doctor, Eighth Doctor, Tegan, Nyssa, Adric	April 2025
2	"Part 2"	Ken Bentley	Tim Foley	Fifth Doctor, Eighth Doctor, Tegan, Nyssa, Adric	April 2025
3	"Part 3"	Ken Bentley	Tim Foley	Fifth Doctor, Eighth Doctor, Tegan, Nyssa, Adric	April 2025
4	"Part 4"	Ken Bentley	Tim Foley	Fifth Doctor, Eighth Doctor, Tegan, Nyssa, Adric	April 2025
5	"Part 5"	Ken Bentley	Tim Foley	Fifth Doctor, Eighth Doctor, Tegan, Nyssa, Adric	April 2025
6	"Part 6"	Ken Bentley	Tim Foley	Fifth Doctor, Eighth Doctor, Tegan, Nyssa, Adric	April 2025
Part 2
1	"Part 7"	Ken Bentley	Tim Foley	Fifth Doctor, Eighth Doctor, Tegan, Nyssa, Adric	May 2025
2	"Part 8"	Ken Bentley	Tim Foley	Fifth Doctor, Eighth Doctor, Tegan, Nyssa, Adric	May 2025
3	"Part 9"	Ken Bentley	Tim Foley	Fifth Doctor, Eighth Doctor, Tegan, Nyssa, Adric	May 2025
4	"Part 10"	Ken Bentley	Tim Foley	Fifth Doctor, Eighth Doctor, Tegan, Nyssa, Adric	May 2025
5	"Part 11"	Ken Bentley	Tim Foley	Fifth Doctor, Eighth Doctor, Tegan, Nyssa, Adric	May 2025
6	"Part 12"	Ken Bentley	Tim Foley	Fifth Doctor, Eighth Doctor, Tegan, Nyssa, Adric	May 2025

==== Helter Skelter (2026) ====
No.	Title	Directed by	Written by	Featuring	Released
1	"Field of Miracles"	Ken Bentley	Lauren Mooney and Stewart Pringle	Fifth Doctor, Tegan, Turlough	April 2026
2	"Helter Skelter"	Ken Bentley	James Moran	Fifth Doctor, Tegan, Turlough	April 2026
3	"Land of Fools"	Ken Bentley	Lauren Mooney and Stewart Pringle	Fifth Doctor, Tegan, Turlough	April 2026

==== Shock and Awe (2026) ====
No.	Title	Directed by	Written by	Featuring	Released
1	"Lair of the Voltaxa"	Ken Bentley	Roland Moore	Fifth Doctor, Nyssa	September 2026
2	"March of the Colossus"	Samuel Clemens	Alan Ronald	Fifth Doctor, Nyssa	September 2026

=== The Sixth Doctor Adventures (2002–present) ===
==== Specials (2002–2013) ====
No.	Title	Directed by	Written by	Featuring	Released
1	"The Ratings War"	Gary Russell	Steve Lyons	Sixth Doctor, Beep the Meep	January 2002
2	"The Maltese Penguin"	Gary Russell	Robert Shearman	Sixth Doctor, Frobisher	June 2002
3	"Real Time"	Gary Russell	Gary Russell	Sixth Doctor, Evelyn Smythe, Cybermen	December 2002
4	"Her Final Flight"	Gary Russell	Julian Shortman	Sixth Doctor, Peri	December 2004
5	"Cryptobiosis"	Gary Russell	Elliot Thorpe	Sixth Doctor, Peri	December 2006
6	"Return of the Krotons"	Nicholas Briggs	Nicholas Briggs	Sixth Doctor, Charley Pollard, Krotons	December 2008
7	"Trial of the Valeyard"	Barnaby Edwards	Alan Barnes and Mike Maddox	Sixth Doctor, The Inquisitor, the Valeyard	December 2013

==== The Sixth Doctor: The Last Adventure (2015) ====
The Sixth Doctor: The Last Adventure is a British audio drama based on the series. Within the narrative of the series, the Doctor, its principal character, is a time-travelling alien known as a Time Lord, whose biological characteristics allow him to regenerate into a new form to circumvent an otherwise deadly experience; the device has been used to allow for a change in lead actor every few years in the production of the televised series. The sixth such instance was depicted in 1987 at the very beginning of Time and the Rani, but due to the firing between seasons of Sixth Doctor actor Colin Baker, the episode gave the event very little screen time and didn't explain what had caused it.

Big Finish Productions producer David Richardson approached Baker in 2014, after seeing "The Time of the Doctor", which had depicted (on television) the regeneration of the Eleventh Doctor into the Twelfth: "I felt very strongly that regeneration stories, and each Doctor’s final end, are very important to Doctor Who fans – these are stories that allow us to see the Doctor at his most courageous, making a sacrifice that only makes us love him more." Baker, who had been working with Big Finish since 1999, agreed to participate, saying that his depiction of the Doctor "did not benefit from" the difficult circumstances the show faced in the 1980s, and that the quality of Big Finish's work was "the only reason [he had] agreed to bring [his] Doctor to an end."

The audio drama consists of four one-hour episodes, each by a different author and each pairing the Doctor with a different companion and taking place at a different point in his life, but all unified by the presence of the villainous Valeyard, a potential future version of the Doctor introduced in Baker's last television serial, The Trial of a Time Lord. Besides Baker, Michael Jayston and Bonnie Langford reprised their roles from The Trial of a Time Lord, respectively as the Valeyard and as the Doctor's companion Mel.

The final part (The Brink of Death) explains that the Sixth Doctor dies due to the radiation of the planet Lakertya as part of his sacrifice in order to stop the Valeyard from taking over existence.

No.	Title	Directed by	Written by	Featuring	Released
1	"The End of the Line"	Nicholas Briggs	Simon Barnard and Paul Morris	Sixth Doctor, Constance Clarke, the Master, the Valeyard	August 2015
2	"The Red House"	Nicholas Briggs	Alan Barnes	Sixth Doctor, Charley Pollard, the Valeyard	August 2015
3	"Stage Fright"	Nicholas Briggs	Matt Fitton	Sixth Doctor, Flip, Jago & Litefoot, the Valeyard	August 2015
4	"The Brink of Death"	Nicholas Briggs	Nicholas Briggs	Sixth Doctor, Mel Bush, the Valeyard, Seventh Doctor	August 2015

==== The Sixth Doctor and Peri (2020) ====
No.	Title	Directed by	Written by	Featuring	Released
1	"The Headless Ones"	Scott Handcock	James Parsons and Andrew Stirling-Brown	Sixth Doctor, Peri Brown	August 2020
2	"Like"	Scott Handcock	Jacqueline Rayner	Sixth Doctor, Peri Brown	August 2020
3	"The Vanity Trap"	Scott Handcock	Stuart Manning	Sixth Doctor, Peri Brown	August 2020
4	"Conflict Theory"	Scott Handcock	Nev Fountain	Sixth Doctor, Peri Brown	August 2020

==== The Eleven (2021) ====
No.	Title	Directed by	Written by	Featuring	Released
1	"One for All"	Ken Bentley	Lizzie Hopley	Sixth Doctor, Constance, the Eleven	September 2021
2	"The Murder of Oliver Akkron"	Ken Bentley	Nigel Fairs	Sixth Doctor, Constance, the Eleven	September 2021
3	"Elevation"	Ken Bentley	Chris Chapman	Sixth Doctor, Constance, the Eleven	September 2021

==== Water Worlds (2022) ====
No.	Title	Directed by	Written by	Featuring	Released
1	"The Rotting Deep"	Helen Goldwyn	Jacqueline Rayner	Sixth Doctor, Melanie Bush, Hebe Harrison	May 2022
2	"The Tides of the Moon"	Helen Goldwyn	Joshua Pruett	Sixth Doctor, Melanie Bush, Hebe Harrison	May 2022
3	"Maelstrom"	Helen Goldwyn	Jonathan Morris	Sixth Doctor, Melanie Bush, Hebe Harrison	May 2022
–	"Interlude: The Dream Nexus"	Read by: Toby Hadoke	Adam Christopher	Sixth Doctor, Melanie Bush, Hebe Harrison	May 2022

==== Purity Undreamed (2022) ====
No.	Title	Directed by	Written by	Featuring	Released
1	"The Mindless Ones"	Helen Goldwyn	Paul Magrs	Sixth Doctor, Mel, Hebe, Elise, Ron, Patricia	August 2022
2	"Reverse Engineering"	Helen Goldwyn	Jonathan Morris	Sixth Doctor, Mel, Hebe, Patricia	August 2022
3	"Chronomancer"	Helen Goldwyn	Robert Valentine	Sixth Doctor, Mel, Hebe, Elise, Ron, Patricia / Purity	August 2022

==== Purity Unleashed (2023) ====
No.	Title	Directed by	Written by	Featuring	Released
1	"Broadway Belongs to Me!"	Helen Goldwyn	Matthew Sweet	Sixth Doctor, Mel	May 2023
2	"Purification"	Helen Goldwyn	Chris Chapman	Sixth Doctor, Mel, Purity	May 2023
3	"Time-Burst"	Helen Goldwyn	Ian Potter	Sixth Doctor, Mel, Purity, Hebe, Ron	May 2023
–	"Interlude: The Doctor and His Amazing Technicolour Nightmare Coat"	Read by: Rosie Baker	Gary Russell	Sixth Doctor, Mel	May 2023

==== Purity Unbound (2023) ====
No.	Title	Directed by	Written by	Featuring	Released
1	"Girl in a Bubble"	Helen Goldwyn	Jacqueline Rayner	Sixth Doctor, Mel, Hebe, Purity	August 2023
2	"The Corruptions"	Helen Goldwyn	Mark Wright	Sixth Doctor, Mel, Hebe, Purity	August 2023
3	"The Wrong Side of History"	Helen Goldwyn	Robert Valentine	Sixth Doctor, Mel, Hebe, Purity	August 2023

==== The Quin Dilemma (2024) ====
No.	Title	Directed by	Written by	Featuring	Released
1	"The Exaltation"	Samuel Clemens	Jacqueline Rayner	Sixth Doctor, Mel	March 2024
2	"Escape from Holy Island"	Samuel Clemens	Chris Chapman	Sixth Doctor, Peri, HG Wells	March 2024
3	"Sibling Rivalry"	Samuel Clemens	Robert Valentine	Sixth Doctor, Constance, Flip, Sontarans	March 2024
4	"Children of the Revolution"	Samuel Clemens	Robert Valentine	Sixth Doctor, Constance, Flip, Sontarans	March 2024
5	"The Thousand Year Thaw"	Samuel Clemens	Chris Chapman	Sixth Doctor, Peri	March 2024
6	"The Firstborn"	Samuel Clemens	Jacqueline Rayner	Sixth Doctor	March 2024
–	"Interlude: The Ultimate Poe"	Read by: David Monteath	Andrew Collins	Sixth Doctor, Mel, Edgar Allan Poe	April 2024

==== The Trials of a Time Lord (2024) ====
No.	Title	Directed by	Written by	Featuring	Released
1	"Part One"	Jonathan S Powell	Rochana Patel	Sixth Doctor, Peri, Mel, Cyber Leader, Davros	August 2024
2	"Part Two"	Jonathan S Powell	Rochana Patel	Sixth Doctor, Peri, Mel, Cyber Leader, Davros	August 2024
3	"Part Three"	Jonathan S Powell	Katharine Armitage	Sixth Doctor, Peri, Mel, Cyber Leader, Davros	August 2024
4	"Part Four"	Jonathan S Powell	Katharine Armitage	Sixth Doctor, Peri, Mel, Cyber Leader, Davros	August 2024
5	"Part Five"	Jonathan S Powell	Stewart Pringle	Sixth Doctor, Peri, Mel, Cyber Leader, Davros	August 2024
6	"Part Six"	Jonathan S Powell	Stewart Pringle	Sixth Doctor, Peri, Mel, Cyber Leader, Davros	August 2024

==== The Cosmos and Mrs Clarke (2025) ====
No.	Title	Directed by	Written by	Featuring	Released
1	"The Story Demon"	Samuel Clemens	Julian Richards	Sixth Doctor, Constance Clarke, Iris Wildthyme, Daleks	May 2025
2	"The Key to Many Worlds"	Samuel Clemens	Paul Magrs	Sixth Doctor, Constance Clarke, Iris Wildthyme, Daleks	May 2025
3	"Inconstancy"	Samuel Clemens	Ian Potter	Sixth Doctor, Constance Clarke, Iris Wildthyme, Daleks	May 2025

==== Bad Terms (2025) ====
No.	Title	Directed by	Written by	Featuring	Released
1	"Saiorse of the Seven Seas"	Samuel Clemens	Nina Millns	Sixth Doctor, Peri Brown	August 2025
2	"Red for Danger!"	Samuel Clemens	Nev Fountain	Sixth Doctor, Peri Brown	August 2025

==== Expulsion (2026) ====
No.	Title	Directed by	Written by	Featuring	Released
1	"The Reckoning"	Samuel Clemens	Nev Fountain	Sixth Doctor, Peri, Vislor Turlough	April 2026
2	"A Crucible of Queens"	Samuel Clemens	Lizbeth Myles	Sixth Doctor, Peri, Vislor Turlough	April 2026
3	"The Curse of the Duergar"	Scott Handcock	Julian Richards	Sixth Doctor, Peri, Vislor Turlough	April 2026

==== Reunion (2026) ====
No.	Title	Directed by	Written by	Featuring	Released
1	"Save the Date"	Samuel Clemens	Matthew Sweet	Sixth Doctor, Peri, Turlough	August 2026
2	"Poison's Reach"	Samuel Clemens	Paul Sutton	Sixth Doctor, Peri, Turlough	August 2026
3	"Broken Home"	Samuel Clemens	AK Benedict and Guy Adams	Sixth Doctor, Peri, Turlough	August 2026

=== The Seventh Doctor Adventures (2001–present) ===
==== Specials (2001–2007) ====
No.	Title	Directed by	Written by	Featuring	Released
1	"Last of the Titans"	Nicholas Briggs	Nicholas Briggs	Seventh Doctor	January 2001
2	"Return of the Daleks"	John Ainsworth	Nicholas Briggs	Seventh Doctor, Daleks, Ogrons	December 2007

==== The Seventh Doctor: The New Adventures (2018) ====
No.	Title	Directed by	Written by	Featuring	Released
1	"The Trial of a Time Machine"	Scott Handcock	Andy Lane	Seventh Doctor, Roz, Chris	November 2018
2	"Vanguard"	Scott Handcock	Steve Jordan	Seventh Doctor, Roz, Chris	November 2018
3	"The Jabari Countdown"	Scott Handcock	Alan Flanagan	Seventh Doctor, Roz, Chris	November 2018
4	"The Dread of Night"	Scott Handcock	Tim Foley	Seventh Doctor, Roz, Chris	November 2018

==== Silver & Ice (2022) ====
No.	Title	Directed by	Written by	Featuring	Released
1	"Bad Day in Tinseltown"	Samuel Clemens	Dan Starkey	Seventh Doctor, Melanie Bush	June 2022
2	"The Ribos Inheritance"	Samuel Clemens	Jonathan Barnes	Seventh Doctor, Melanie Bush	June 2022
–	"Interlude: The Haunting of Bryck Place"	Read by: Sophie Aldred	Georgia Cook	Seventh Doctor, Ace	June 2022

==== Sullivan and Cross – AWOL (2022) ====
No.	Title	Directed by	Written by	Featuring	Released
1	"London Orbital"	Bethany Weimers	John Dorney	Seventh Doctor, Harry Sullivan, Naomi Cross	November 2022
2	"Scream of the Daleks"	Bethany Weimers	Lisa McMullin	Seventh Doctor, Harry, Naomi, Daleks	November 2022

==== Far From Home (2023) ====
No.	Title	Directed by	Written by	Featuring	Released
1	"Operation Dusk"	Samuel Clemens	Alfie Shaw	Seventh Doctor, Harry, Naomi, Vashta Nerada, The Forge	June 2023
2	"Naomi’s Ark"	Samuel Clemens	Allison Winter	Seventh Doctor, Harry, Naomi	June 2023
–	"Interlude: Frozen Worlds"	Read by: Sophie Aldred	Katherine Armitage	Seventh Doctor	June 2023

==== The Last Day (2023–2024) ====
No.	Title	Directed by	Written by	Featuring	Released
Part One
1	"Part 1"	Samuel Clemens	Matt Fitton & Guy Adams	Seventh Doctor, Ace, Melanie Bush, The Master, Bernice Summerfield, Lysandra Aristedes, Hex Schofield, Kane, Sally Morgan, Sontarans	December 2023
2	"Part 2"	Samuel Clemens	Matt Fitton & Guy Adams	Seventh Doctor, Ace, Melanie Bush, The Master, Bernice Summerfield, Lysandra Aristedes, Hex Schofield, Kane, Sally Morgan, Sontarans	December 2023
3	"Part 3"	Samuel Clemens	Matt Fitton & Guy Adams	Seventh Doctor, Ace, Melanie Bush, The Master, Bernice Summerfield, Lysandra Aristedes, Hex Schofield, Kane, Sally Morgan, Sontarans	December 2023
4	"Part 4"	Samuel Clemens	Matt Fitton & Guy Adams	Seventh Doctor, Ace, Melanie Bush, The Master, Bernice Summerfield, Lysandra Aristedes, Hex Schofield, Kane, Sally Morgan, Sontarans	December 2023
5	"Part 5"	Samuel Clemens	Matt Fitton & Guy Adams	Seventh Doctor, Ace, Melanie Bush, The Master, Bernice Summerfield, Lysandra Aristedes, Hex Schofield, Kane, Sally Morgan, Sontarans	December 2023
6	"Part 6"	Samuel Clemens	Matt Fitton & Guy Adams	Seventh Doctor, Ace, Melanie Bush, The Master, Bernice Summerfield, Lysandra Aristedes, Hex Schofield, Kane, Sally Morgan, Sontarans	December 2023
Part Two
1	"Part 7"	Samuel Clemens	Matt Fitton & Guy Adams	Seventh Doctor, Ace, Melanie Bush, Roz Forrester, The Master, Bernice Summerfield, Vienna Salvatori, Lysandra Aristedes, Chris Cwej, Hex Schofield, Kane, Sally Morgan, Ogrons, Sontarans	June 2024
2	"Part 8"	Samuel Clemens	Matt Fitton & Guy Adams	Seventh Doctor, Ace, Melanie Bush, Roz Forrester, The Master, Bernice Summerfield, Vienna Salvatori, Lysandra Aristedes, Chris Cwej, Hex Schofield, Kane, Sally Morgan, Ogrons, Sontarans	June 2024
3	"Part 9"	Samuel Clemens	Matt Fitton & Guy Adams	Seventh Doctor, Ace, Melanie Bush, Roz Forrester, The Master, Bernice Summerfield, Vienna Salvatori, Lysandra Aristedes, Chris Cwej, Hex Schofield, Kane, Sally Morgan, Ogrons, Sontarans	June 2024
4	"Part 10"	Samuel Clemens	Matt Fitton & Guy Adams	Seventh Doctor, Ace, Melanie Bush, Roz Forrester, The Master, Bernice Summerfield, Vienna Salvatori, Lysandra Aristedes, Chris Cwej, Hex Schofield, Kane, Sally Morgan, Ogrons, Sontarans	June 2024
5	"Part 11"	Samuel Clemens	Matt Fitton & Guy Adams	Seventh Doctor, Ace, Melanie Bush, Roz Forrester, The Master, Bernice Summerfield, Vienna Salvatori, Lysandra Aristedes, Chris Cwej, Hex Schofield, Kane, Sally Morgan, Ogrons, Sontarans	June 2024
6	"Part 12"	Samuel Clemens	Matt Fitton & Guy Adams	Seventh Doctor, Ace, Melanie Bush, Roz Forrester, The Master, Bernice Summerfield, Vienna Salvatori, Lysandra Aristedes, Chris Cwej, Hex Schofield, Kane, Sally Morgan, Ogrons, Sontarans	June 2024
–	"Interlude: Fond Memories"	Read by: Sophie Aldred	Alison Lawson	Seventh Doctor, Ace	June 2024

==== The Doctor and Carnacki (2024) ====
No.	Title	Directed by	Written by	Featuring	Released
1	"The Haunter of the Shore"	Samuel Clemens	AK Benedict	Seventh Doctor, Thomas Carnacki	November 2024
2	"The House"	Samuel Clemens	Georgia Cook	Seventh Doctor, Thomas Carnacki	November 2024
3	"The Institute of Forgotten Souls"	Samuel Clemens	Jonathan Barnes	Seventh Doctor, Thomas Carnacki	November 2024

==== Past Forward (2025) ====
No.	Title	Directed by	Written by	Featuring	Released
1	"With the Angels (Part 1)"	Samuel Clemens	John Dorney	Seventh Doctor, Harry, Naomi	June 2025
2	"Catastrophix"	Samuel Clemens	Lizzie Hopley	Seventh Doctor, Harry, Naomi	June 2025
3	"With the Angels (Part 2)"	Samuel Clemens	John Dorney	Seventh Doctor, Harry, Naomi	June 2025

==== Wicked! (2025) ====
No.	Title	Directed by	Written by	Featuring	Released
1	"Backwards and in Heels"	Samuel Clemens	Alison Winter	Seventh Doctor, Ace	October 2025
2	"The Price of Snow"	Samuel Clemens	Katharine Armitage	Seventh Doctor, Ace	October 2025
3	"The Ingeniuous Gentlemen"	Samuel Clemens	Alan Ronald	Seventh Doctor, Ace	October 2025

==== Fixers (2026) ====
No.	Title	Directed by	Written by	Featuring	Released
1	"The Executor"	Samuel Clemens	Chris Chapman	Seventh Doctor, Ray	July 2026
2	"Oil and Water"	Samuel Clemens	James McDermott	Seventh Doctor, Ray	July 2026
3	"Much Ado About Racing"	Samuel Clemens	Fio Tretheway	Seventh Doctor, Ray	July 2026

==== Homecoming (2027) ====
No.	Title	Directed by	Written by	Featuring	Released
1	"The Auton Invasion"	Jonathan Morris	Jonathan S. Powell	Seventh Doctor, Ace, Hex	January 2027
2	"The Leviathan"	Jonathan Morris	Rochana Patel	Seventh Doctor, Ace, Hex	January 2027
3	"There's No Place Like Home"	Jonathan Morris	Jonathan Morris	Seventh Doctor, Ace, Hex	January 2027

=== The Eighth Doctor Adventures (2003–present) ===
==== Special (2003) ====
No.	Title	Directed by	Written by	Featuring	Released
–	"Living Legend"	Gary Russell	Scott Gray	Eighth Doctor, Charley	November 2003

==== The Eighth Doctor Adventures Series 1 (2007) ====
In 2006 Big Finish began a standalone range of audio plays featuring the Eighth Doctor. These stories were set after his travels with Charley Pollard and C'rizz in the main range, which were subsequently ended.

No.	Title	Directed by	Written by	Featuring	Released
1	"Blood of the Daleks (Part 1)"	Nicholas Briggs	Steve Lyons	Eighth Doctor, Lucie Miller, Daleks, the Headhunter	January 2007
2	"Blood of the Daleks (Part 2)"	Nicholas Briggs	Steve Lyons	Eighth Doctor, Lucie, Daleks, the Headhunter	February 2007
3	"Horror of Glam Rock"	Barnaby Edwards	Paul Magrs	Eighth Doctor, Lucie, the Headhunter	March 2007
4	"Immortal Beloved"	Jason Haigh-Ellery	Jonathan Clements	Eighth Doctor, Lucie	April 2007
5	"Phobos"	Barnaby Edwards	Eddie Robson	Eighth Doctor, Lucie, the Headhunter	May 2007
6	"No More Lies"	Barnaby Edwards	Paul Sutton	Eighth Doctor, Lucie, the Headhunter	June 2007
7	"Human Resources (Part 1)"	Nicholas Briggs	Eddie Robson	Eighth Doctor, Lucie, the Headhunter	July 2007
8	"Human Resources (Part 2)"	Nicholas Briggs	Eddie Robson	Eighth Doctor, Lucie, the Headhunter, Cybermen	August 2007

==== The Eighth Doctor Adventures Series 2 (2008) ====
No.	Title	Directed by	Written by	Featuring	Released
1	"Dead London"	Barnaby Edwards	Pat Mills	Eighth Doctor, Lucie	January 2008
2	"Max Warp"	Barnaby Edwards	Jonathan Morris	Eighth Doctor, Lucie	February 2008
3	"Brave New Town"	Jason Haigh-Ellery	Jonathan Clements	Eighth Doctor, Lucie, Autons	March 2008
4	"The Skull of Sobek"	Barnaby Edwards	Marc Platt	Eighth Doctor, Lucie	April 2008
5	"Grand Theft Cosmos"	Barnaby Edwards	Eddie Robson	Eighth Doctor, Lucie, the Headhunter	May 2008
6	"The Zygon Who Fell to Earth"	Barnaby Edwards	Paul Magrs	Eighth Doctor, Lucie, Zygons	June 2008
7	"Sisters of the Flame (Part 1)"	Nicholas Briggs	Nicholas Briggs	Eighth Doctor, Lucie, Sisterhood of Karn	July 2008
8	"Vengeance of Morbius (Part 2)"	Nicholas Briggs	Nicholas Briggs	Eighth Doctor, Lucie, Morbius	August 2008

==== The Eighth Doctor Adventures Series 3 (2009) ====
No.	Title	Directed by	Written by	Featuring	Released
1	"Orbis"	Nicholas Briggs	Alan Barnes, Nicholas Briggs	Eighth Doctor, Lucie, the Headhunter	March 2009
2	"Hothouse"	Barnaby Edwards	Jonathan Morris	Eighth Doctor, Lucie, Krynoids	April 2009
3	"The Beast of Orlok"	Barnaby Edwards	Barnaby Edwards	Eighth Doctor, Lucie	May 2009
4	"Wirrn Dawn"	Nicholas Briggs	Nicholas Briggs	Eighth Doctor, Lucie, Wirrn	June 2009
5	"The Scapegoat"	Nicholas Briggs	Pat Mills	Eighth Doctor, Lucie	July 2009
6	"The Cannibalists"	Jason Haigh-Ellery	Jonathan Morris	Eighth Doctor, Lucie	August 2009
7	"The Eight Truths (Part 1)"	Nicholas Briggs	Eddie Robson	Eighth Doctor, Lucie, the Headhunter	September 2009
8	"Worldwide Web (Part 2)"	Nicholas Briggs	Eddie Robson	Eighth Doctor, Lucie, the Headhunter, the Eight Legs	October 2009

==== The Eighth Doctor Adventures Series 4 (2009–2011) ====
No.	Title	Directed by	Written by	Featuring	Released
1	"Death in Blackpool"	Barnaby Edwards	Alan Barnes	Eighth Doctor, Lucie, Zygons	December 2009
2	"Situation Vacant"	Nicholas Briggs	Eddie Robson	Eighth Doctor, Tamsin Drew	July 2010
3	"Nevermore"	Nicholas Briggs	Alan Barnes	Eighth Doctor, Tamsin	August 2010
4	"The Book of Kells"	Barnaby Edwards	Barnaby Edwards	Eighth Doctor, Tamsin, the Monk, Lucie	September 2010
5	"Deimos (Part 1)"	Barnaby Edwards	Jonathan Morris	Eighth Doctor, Tamsin, Ice Warriors	October 2010
6	"The Resurrection of Mars (Part 2)"	Barnaby Edwards	Jonathan Morris	Eighth Doctor, Tamsin, Lucie, Ice Warriors, the Monk	November 2010
7	"Relative Dimensions"	Barnaby Edwards	Marc Platt	Eighth Doctor, Lucie, Susan Foreman, Alex Campbell	December 2010
8	"Prisoner of the Sun"	Jason Haigh-Ellery	Eddie Robson	Eighth Doctor	January 2011
9	"Lucie Miller (Part 1)"	Nicholas Briggs	Nicholas Briggs	Eighth Doctor, Lucie, Tamsin, Susan, Alex, the Monk, Daleks	February 2011
10	"To the Death (Part 2)"	Nicholas Briggs	Nicholas Briggs	Eighth Doctor, Lucie, Tamsin, Susan, Alex, the Monk, Daleks	March 2011

==== Special (2010) ====
No.	Title	Directed by	Written by	Featuring	Released
–	"An Earthly Child"	Nicholas Briggs	Marc Platt	Eighth Doctor, Susan Foreman, Alex Campbell	December 2010

==== Dark Eyes Series 1 (2012) ====
Following on directly from the Eighth Doctor Adventures, Dark Eyes consists of four box sets, each made up of four hour-long episodes, the first released in November 2012 and the last in March 2015.

No.	Title	Directed by	Written by	Featuring	Released
1	"The Great War"	Nicholas Briggs	Nicholas Briggs	Eighth Doctor, Molly O'Sullivan, Daleks	November 2012
2	"Fugitives"	Nicholas Briggs	Nicholas Briggs	Eighth Doctor, Molly, Sally Armstrong, Daleks	November 2012
3	"Tangled Web"	Nicholas Briggs	Nicholas Briggs	Eighth Doctor, Molly, Daleks	November 2012
4	"X and the Daleks"	Nicholas Briggs	Nicholas Briggs	Eighth Doctor, Molly, Daleks	November 2012

==== Dark Eyes Series 2 (2014) ====
No.	Title	Directed by	Written by	Featuring	Released
1	"The Traitor"	Nicholas Briggs	Nicholas Briggs	Eighth Doctor, Liv Chenka, Daleks	February 2014
2	"The White Room"	Nicholas Briggs	Alan Barnes	Eighth Doctor, Molly O'Sullivan, Viyrans	February 2014
3	"Time's Horizon"	Nicholas Briggs	Matt Fitton	Eighth Doctor, Molly, Liv, the Eminence	February 2014
4	"Eyes of the Master"	Nicholas Briggs	Matt Fitton	Eighth Doctor, Molly, Liv, the Master, Sally Armstrong, the Eminence	February 2014

==== Dark Eyes Series 3 (2014) ====
No.	Title	Directed by	Written by	Featuring	Released
1	"The Death of Hope"	Ken Bentley	Matt Fitton	Eighth Doctor, Molly O'Sullivan, Sally Armstrong, Narvin, the Master, the Eminence	November 2014
2	"The Reviled"	Ken Bentley	Matt Fitton	Eighth Doctor, Liv Chenka, Sally, Narvin, the Master, the Eminence	November 2014
3	"Masterplan"	Ken Bentley	Matt Fitton	Eighth Doctor, Liv, Molly, Sally, Narvin, the Master, the Eminence	November 2014
4	"Rule of the Eminence"	Ken Bentley	Matt Fitton	Eighth Doctor, Liv, Molly, Narvin, the Master, the Eminence	November 2014

==== Dark Eyes Series 4 (2015) ====
No.	Title	Directed by	Written by	Featuring	Released
1	"A Life in the Day"	Ken Bentley	John Dorney	Eighth Doctor, Liv Chenka	March 2015
2	"The Monster of Montmartre"	Ken Bentley	Matt Fitton	Eighth Doctor, Liv, the Master, Daleks	March 2015
3	"Master of the Daleks"	Ken Bentley	John Dorney	Eighth Doctor, Liv, Molly O'Sullivan, the Master, Daleks, Sontarans	March 2015
4	"Eye of Darkness"	Ken Bentley	Matt Fitton	Eighth Doctor, Liv, Molly, Daleks, the Eminence	March 2015

==== Doom Coalition Series 1 (2015) ====
No.	Title	Directed by	Written by	Featuring	Released
1	"The Eleven"	Ken Bentley	Matt Fitton	Seventh Doctor, Eighth Doctor, Liv Chenka, the Eleven, Padrac	October 2015
2	"The Red Lady"	Ken Bentley	John Dorney	Eighth Doctor, Liv, Helen Sinclair, Caleera	October 2015
3	"The Galileo Trap"	Ken Bentley	Marc Platt	Eighth Doctor, Liv, Helen	October 2015
4	"The Satanic Mill"	Ken Bentley	Edward Collier	Eighth Doctor, Liv, Helen, the Eleven, Padrac	October 2015

==== Doom Coalition Series 2 (2016) ====
No.	Title	Directed by	Written by	Featuring	Released
1	"Beachhead"	Ken Bentley	Nicholas Briggs	Eighth Doctor, Liv, Helen, Voord	March 2016
2	"Scenes from Her Life"	Ken Bentley	John Dorney	Eighth Doctor, Liv, Helen, Caleera, the Eleven	March 2016
3	"The Gift"	Ken Bentley	Marc Platt	Eighth Doctor, Liv, Helen, Caleera	March 2016
4	"The Sonomancer"	Ken Bentley	Matt Fitton	Eighth Doctor, Liv, Helen, River Song, Caleera, the Eleven	March 2016

==== Doom Coalition Series 3 (2016) ====
No.	Title	Directed by	Written by	Featuring	Released
1	"Absent Friends"	Ken Bentley	John Dorney	Eighth Doctor, Liv, Helen	September 2016
2	"The Eighth Piece"	Ken Bentley	Matt Fitton	Eighth Doctor, Liv, Helen, River, the Eight, the Clocksmith	September 2016
3	"The Doomsday Chronometer"	Ken Bentley	Matt Fitton	Eighth Doctor, Liv, Helen, River, the Eight, the Clocksmith	September 2016
4	"The Crucible of Souls"	Ken Bentley	John Dorney	Eighth Doctor, Liv, Helen, River, the Nine, Padrac	September 2016

==== Doom Coalition Series 4 (2017) ====
No.	Title	Directed by	Written by	Featuring	Released
1	"Ship in a Bottle"	Ken Bentley	John Dorney	Eighth Doctor, Liv, Helen	March 2017
2	"Songs of Love"	Ken Bentley	Matt Fitton	Eighth Doctor, Liv, Helen, River, Padrac, Caleera, the Eleven	March 2017
3	"The Side of the Angels"	Ken Bentley	Matt Fitton	Eighth Doctor, Liv, Helen, Ollistra, Caleera, the Eleven, the Monk, Weeping Angels	March 2017
4	"Stop the Clock"	Ken Bentley	John Dorney	Eighth Doctor, Liv, Helen, the Eleven, Padrac, Caleera	March 2017

==== The Eighth Doctor: The Time War Series 1 (2017) ====
A special run of prequels to Doctor Who: The War Doctor.

No.	Title	Directed by	Written by	Featuring	Released
1	"The Starship of Theseus"	Ken Bentley	John Dorney	Eighth Doctor, Sheena, Bliss, Daleks	October 2017
2	"Echoes of War"	Ken Bentley	Matt Fitton	Eighth Doctor, Bliss, Daleks	October 2017
3	"The Conscript"	Ken Bentley	Matt Fitton	Eighth Doctor, Bliss, Ollistra, Daleks	October 2017
4	"One Life"	Ken Bentley	John Dorney	Eighth Doctor, Bliss, Ollistra, Daleks	October 2017

==== The Eighth Doctor: The Time War Series 2 (2018) ====
No.	Title	Directed by	Written by	Featuring	Released
1	"The Lords of Terror"	Ken Bentley	Jonathan Morris	Eighth Doctor, Bliss, Daleks	July 2018
2	"Planet of the Ogrons"	Ken Bentley	Guy Adams	Eighth Doctor, Bliss, Daleks, the Twelve, Ogrons	July 2018
3	"In the Garden of Death"	Ken Bentley	Guy Adams	Eighth Doctor, Bliss, Daleks, Ollistra, the Twelve	July 2018
4	"Jonah"	Ken Bentley	Timothy X Atack	Eighth Doctor, Bliss, Daleks, Ollistra, the Twelve	July 2018

==== The Eighth Doctor: The Time War Series 3 (2019) ====
No.	Title	Directed by	Written by	Featuring	Released
1	"State of Bliss"	Ken Bentley	Matt Fitton	Eighth Doctor, Bliss	August 2019
2	"The Famished Lands"	Ken Bentley	Lisa McMullin	Eighth Doctor, Bliss	August 2019
3	"Fugitive in Time"	Ken Bentley	Roland Moore	Eighth Doctor, Bliss	August 2019
4	"The War Valeyard"	Ken Bentley	John Dorney	Eighth Doctor, Bliss, The Valeyard	August 2019

==== The Eighth Doctor: The Time War Series 4 (2020) ====
No.	Title	Directed by	Written by	Featuring	Released
1	"Palindrome – Part 1"	Helen Goldwyn	John Dorney	Eighth Doctor, Bliss, Davros, Daleks	September 2020
2	"Palindrome – Part 2"	Helen Goldwyn	John Dorney	Eighth Doctor, Bliss, Davros, Daleks	September 2020
3	"Dreadshade"	Helen Goldwyn	Lisa McMullin	Eighth Doctor, Bliss, The General, the Twelve	September 2020
4	"Restoration of the Daleks"	Helen Goldwyn	Matt Fitton	Eighth Doctor, Bliss, Davros, Daleks	September 2020

==== The Eighth Doctor: The Time War Series 5 – Cass (2023) ====
No.	Title	Directed by	Written by	Featuring	Released
1	"Meanwhile, Elsewhere"	Ken Bentley	Tim Foley	Eighth Doctor, Cass Fermazzi, Alex Campbell	January 2023
2	"Vespertine"	Ken Bentley	Lou Morgan	Eighth Doctor, Cass, Alex	January 2023
3	"Previously, Next Time - Part 1"	Ken Bentley	James Moran	Eighth Doctor, Cass, Alex, Daleks	January 2023
4	"Previously, Next Time - Part 2"	Ken Bentley	James Moran	Eighth Doctor, Cass, Alex, Daleks	January 2023

==== The Eighth Doctor: The Time War: Series 6 – Uncharted 1: Reflections (2024) ====
No.	Title	Directed by	Written by	Featuring	Released
1	"Nowhere, Never"	Ken Bentley	Katerine Armitage	Eighth Doctor, Cass, Alex Campbell, Helen Sinclair, C'rizz	October 2024
2	"The Road Untravelled"	Ken Bentley	Tim Foley	Eighth Doctor, Cass, Alex Campbell, Helen Sinclair, C'rizz	October 2024
3	"Cass-cade"	Ken Bentley	James Moran	Eighth Doctor, Cass, Alex Campbell, Helen Sinclair, C'rizz	October 2024
4	"Borrow or Rob"	Ken Bentley	Tim Foley	Eighth Doctor, Cass, Alex Campbell, Helen Sinclair, C'rizz	October 2024

==== The Eighth Doctor: The Time War: Series 7 – Uncharted 2: Pursuit (2025) ====
No.	Title	Directed by	Written by	Featuring	Released
1	"Spoil of War"	Ken Bentley	Mark Wright	Eighth Doctor, Cass, Alex Campbell	June 2025
2	"The Tale of Alex"	Ken Bentley	Katerine Armitage	Eighth Doctor, Cass, Alex Campbell	June 2025
3	"See-Saw"	Ken Bentley	James Moran	Eighth Doctor, Cass, Alex Campbell	June 2025
4	"The First Forest"	Ken Bentley	Tim Foley	Eighth Doctor, Cass, Alex Campbell	June 2025

==== The Eighth Doctor: The Time War: Series 8 – Uncharted 3: Branches (2026) ====
No.	Title	Directed by	Written by	Featuring	Released
1	"The Only Girl in the World"	Ken Bentley	John Dorney	Eighth Doctor, Cass, Alex	May 2026
2	"False Dawn"	Ken Bentley	Alison Winter	Eighth Doctor, Cass, Alex	May 2026
3	"The Council of Susan"	Ken Bentley	Tim Foley	Eighth Doctor, Cass, Alex, Susan Foreman	May 2026
4	"All Over"	Ken Bentley	Patrick O'Connor	Eighth Doctor, Cass, Alex, Susan Foreman	May 2026

==== Ravenous Series 1 (2018) ====
No.	Title	Directed by	Written by	Featuring	Released
1	"Their Finest Hour"	Ken Bentley	John Dorney	Eighth Doctor, Liv Chenka, Winston Churchill	April 2018
2	"How to Make a Killing in Time Travel"	Ken Bentley	John Dorney	Eighth Doctor, Liv	April 2018
3	"World of Damnation"	Ken Bentley	Matt Fitton	Eighth Doctor, Liv, Helen Sinclair, the Eleven, Kandyman	April 2018
4	"Sweet Salvation"	Ken Bentley	Matt Fitton	Eighth Doctor, Liv, Helen, the Eleven, Kandyman	April 2018

==== Ravenous Series 2 (2018) ====
No.	Title	Directed by	Written by	Featuring	Released
1	"Escape from Kaldor"	Ken Bentley	Matt Fitton	Eighth Doctor, Liv, Helen, Voc Robots	October 2018
2	"Better Watch Out"	Ken Bentley	John Dorney	Eighth Doctor, Liv, Helen	October 2018
3	"Fairytale of Salzburg"	Ken Bentley	John Dorney	Eighth Doctor, Liv, Helen	October 2018
4	"Seizure"	Ken Bentley	Guy Adams	Eighth Doctor, Liv, Helen, the Eleven	October 2018

==== Ravenous Series 3 (2019) ====
No.	Title	Directed by	Written by	Featuring	Released
1	"Deeptime Frontier"	Ken Bentley	Matt Fitton	Eighth Doctor, Liv, Helen	April 2019
2	"Companion Piece"	Ken Bentley	John Dorney	Eighth Doctor, Liv, Helen, Charley Pollard, River Song, Bliss, the Nine	April 2019
3	"L.E.G.E.N.D"	Ken Bentley	Matt Fitton	Eighth Doctor, Liv, Helen, the Eleven	April 2019
4	"The Odds Against"	Ken Bentley	John Dorney	Eighth Doctor, Liv, Helen, the Nine, the Eleven	April 2019

==== Ravenous Series 4 (2019) ====
No.	Title	Directed by	Written by	Featuring	Released
1	"Whisper"	Ken Bentley	Matt Fitton	Eighth Doctor, Liv, Helen, The Eleven	October 2019
2	"Planet of Dust"	Ken Bentley	Matt Fitton	Eighth Doctor, Liv, Helen, The Eleven, The Master	October 2019
3	"Day of the Master – Part 1"	Ken Bentley	John Dorney	Eighth Doctor, Liv, Helen, The Eleven, The Master	October 2019
4	"Day of the Master – Part 2"	Ken Bentley	John Dorney	Eighth Doctor, Liv, Helen, The Eleven, The Master	October 2019

==== Stranded Series 1 (2020) ====
Featuring the first appearance of Tania Bell (Rebecca Root), the first transgender companion in any Doctor Who media.

No.	Title	Directed by	Written by	Featuring	Released
1	"Lost Property"	Ken Bentley	Matt Fitton	Eighth Doctor, Helen, Liv, Tania Bell, Robin Bright-Thompson, The Curator	June 2020
2	"Wild Animals"	Ken Bentley	John Dorney	Eighth Doctor, Helen, Liv, Tania	June 2020
3	"Must-See TV"	Ken Bentley	Lisa McMullin	Eighth Doctor, Helen, Liv, Tania, Andy Davidson, Robin, Mr. Bird	June 2020
4	"Divine Intervention"	Ken Bentley	David K Barnes	Eighth Doctor, Helen, Liv, Tania, Andy, Robin	June 2020

==== Stranded Series 2 (2021) ====
No.	Title	Directed by	Written by	Featuring	Released
1	"Dead Time"	Ken Bentley	Matt Fitton	Eighth Doctor, Liv, Helen, Tania, Andy, Robin	March 2021
2	"UNIT Dating"	Ken Bentley	Roy Gill	Eighth Doctor, Liv, Helen, Tania, Andy, the Brigadier	March 2021
3	"Baker Street Irregulars"	Ken Bentley	Lisa McMullin	Eighth Doctor, Liv, Helen, Tania, Andy	March 2021
4	"The Long Way Round"	Ken Bentley	John Dorney	Eighth Doctor, Liv, Helen, Tania, Andy, Robin	March 2021

==== Stranded Series 3 (2021) ====
No.	Title	Directed by	Written by	Featuring	Released
1	"Patience"	Ken Bentley	Tim Foley	Eighth Doctor, Liv, Helen, Tania, Andy, Judoon	December 2021
2	"Twisted Folklore"	Ken Bentley	Lizzie Hopley	Eighth Doctor, Liv, Helen, Tania, Andy	December 2021
3	"Snow"	Ken Bentley	James Kettle	Eighth Doctor, Liv, Helen, Tania, Andy	December 2021
4	"What Just Happened?"	Ken Bentley	John Dorney	Eighth Doctor, Liv, Helen, Tania, Andy, Robin	December 2021

==== Stranded Series 4 (2022) ====
No.	Title	Directed by	Written by	Featuring	Released
1	"Crossed Lines"	Ken Bentley	Matt Fitton	Eighth Doctor, Helen, Liv, Tania, Mr. Bird, Robin, The Curator	April 2022
2	"Get Andy"	Ken Bentley	Lisa McMullin	Eighth Doctor, Helen, Liv, Andy, Mr. Bird	April 2022
3	"The Keys of Baker Street"	Ken Bentley	Roy Gill	Eighth Doctor, Helen, Liv, Tania, Andy, Mr. Bird, Robin, The Curator	April 2022
4	"Best Year Ever"	Ken Bentley	John Dorney	Eighth Doctor, Liv, Helen, Tania, Andy	April 2022

==== The Further Adventures of Lucie Miller (2019) ====
Announced in August 2018, this series is set between the first and second series of audio adventures. Announced in August 2018, this series is set between the first and second series of audio adventures.

No.	Title	Directed by	Written by	Featuring	Released
1	"The Dalek Trap"	Nicholas Briggs	Nicholas Briggs	Eighth Doctor, Lucie, Daleks, The Fendahl	July 2019
2	"The Revolution Game"	Nicholas Briggs	Alice Cavender	Eighth Doctor, Lucie, Daleks, The Fendahl	July 2019
3	"The House on the Edge of Chaos"	Nicholas Briggs	Eddie Robson	Eighth Doctor, Lucie, Daleks, The Fendahl	July 2019
4	"Island of the Fendahl"	Nicholas Briggs	Alan Barnes	Eighth Doctor, Lucie, Daleks, The Fendahl	July 2019

==== Charlotte Pollard – The Further Adventuress (2022) ====
No.	Title	Directed by	Written by	Featuring	Released
1	"The Mummy Speaks!"	Ken Bentley	Alan Barnes	Eighth Doctor, Charley, Deeva Jansen	January 2022
2	"Eclipse"	Ken Bentley	Lisa McMullin	Eighth Doctor, Charley, Deeva Jansen	January 2022
3	"The Slaying of the Writhing Mass"	Ken Bentley	Eddie Robson	Eighth Doctor, Charley, Deeva Jansen	January 2022
4	"Heart of Orion"	Ken Bentley	Nicholas Briggs	Eighth Doctor, Charley, Deeva Jansen	January 2022

==== What Lies Inside? (2022) ====
No.	Title	Directed by	Written by	Featuring	Released
1	"Paradox of the Daleks (Part 1)"	Ken Bentley	John Dorney	Eighth Doctor, Liv, Helen, Daleks	November 2022
2	"Paradox of the Daleks (Part 2)"	Ken Bentley	John Dorney	Eighth Doctor, Liv, Helen, Daleks	November 2022
3	"The Dalby Spook"	Ken Bentley	Lauren Mooney & Stewart Pringle	Eighth Doctor, Liv, Helen	November 2022

==== Connections (2022) ====
No.	Title	Directed by	Written by	Featuring	Released
1	"Here Lies Drax"	Ken Bentley	John Dorney	Eighth Doctor, Liv, Helen, Drax	December 2022
2	"The Love Vampires"	Ken Bentley	James Kettle	Eighth Doctor, Liv, Helen	December 2022
3	"Albie's Angels"	Ken Bentley	Roy Gill	Eighth Doctor, Liv, Helen, Weeping Angels	December 2022

==== Audacity (2023) ====
No.	Title	Directed by	Written by	Featuring	Released
1	"The Devouring"	Ken Bentley	Lisa McMullin	Eighth Doctor, Lady Audacity Montague	November 2023
2	"The Great Cyber War (Part 1)"	Ken Bentley	Tim Foley	Eighth Doctor, Audacity, Cybermen	November 2023
3	"The Great Cyber War (Part 2)"	Ken Bentley	Tim Foley	Eighth Doctor, Audacity, Cybermen	November 2023

==== In the Bleak Midwinter (2023) ====
No.	Title	Directed by	Written by	Featuring	Released
1	"Twenty-Four Doors in December"	Ken Bentley	John Dorney	Eighth Doctor, Audacity, Charley	December 2023
2	"The Empty Man"	Ken Bentley	Tim Foley	Eighth Doctor, Audacity, Charley	December 2023
3	"Winter of the Demon"	Ken Bentley	Roy Gill	Eighth Doctor, Audacity, Charley	December 2023

==== Echoes (2024) ====
No.	Title	Directed by	Written by	Featuring	Released
1	"Birdsong"	Ken Bentley	Tim Foley	Eighth Doctor, Liv, Helen	May 2024
2	"Lost Hearts"	Ken Bentley	Lauren Mooney & Stewart Pringle	Eighth Doctor, Liv, Helen	May 2024
3	"Slow Beasts"	Ken Bentley	Dan Rebellato	Eighth Doctor, Liv, Helen	May 2024

==== The Stuff of Legend (2024) ====
A Special 25th Anniversary special of Big Finish Doctor Who audio dramas. Released alongside a full-cast live recording event at Cadogan Hall in London on Saturday 14 September 2024.

No.	Title	Directed by	Written by	Featuring	Released
–	"The Stuff of Legend (Studio Version)"	Barnaby Edwards	Robert Valentine	Eighth Doctor, Charley, The Master, Daleks	September 2024

==== Deadly Strangers (2024) ====
No.	Title	Directed by	Written by	Featuring	Released
1	"Puccini and the Doctor"	Ken Bentley	Matthew Jacobs	Eighth Doctor, Audacity, Charley	December 2024
2	"Women's Day Off"	Ken Bentley	Lisa McMullin	Eighth Doctor, Audacity, Charley	December 2024
3	"The Gloaming"	Ken Bentley	Lauren Mooney & Stewart Pringle	Eighth Doctor, Audacity, Charley	December 2024

==== Causeway (2025) ====
No.	Title	Directed by	Written by	Featuring	Released
1	"Lost Amongst the Stars"	Ken Bentley	Rochana Patel	Eighth Doctor, Audacity, Charley	November 2025
2	"The Time You Never Had – Part 1"	Ken Bentley	Tim Foley	Eighth Doctor, Audacity, Charley	November 2025
3	"The Time You Never Had – Part 2"	Ken Bentley	Tim Foley	Eighth Doctor, Audacity, Charley	November 2025

==== Empty Vessels (2025) ====
No.	Title	Directed by	Written by	Featuring	Released
1	"Eos Falling"	Ken Bentley	Matt Fitton	Eighth Doctor, Liv, Helen	December 2025
2	"Lure of the Zygons – Part 1"	Ken Bentley	Roy Gill	Eighth Doctor, Liv, Helen	December 2025
3	"Lure of the Zygons – Part 2"	Ken Bentley	Roy Gill	Eighth Doctor, Liv, Helen	December 2025

==== New Pathways (2026) ====
No.	Title	Directed by	Written by	Featuring	Released
Volume 1: New Pathways
1	"Chase"	Ken Bentley	Alan Ronald	Eighth Doctor, Chase, Alfie	November 2026
2	"Magic of the Sycorax"	Ken Bentley	Katharine Armitage	Eighth Doctor, Chase, Alfie, the Sycorax	November 2026
3	"Blast from the Past"	Ken Bentley	Robert Valentine	Eighth Doctor, Chase, Alfie	November 2026
Volume 2: Fear the Reapers
4	"The Junction"	Ken Bentley	Helen Goldwyn	Eighth Doctor, Chase, Alfie, Reapers	December 2026
5	"Yesterday Dies Today"	Ken Bentley	Alfie Shaw	Eighth Doctor, Chase, Alfie, Reapers	December 2026
6	"Matilda"	Ken Bentley	Alan Ronald	Eighth Doctor, Chase, Alfie, Reapers	December 2026

=== The Audio Novellas (2026–present) ===
It is a spin-off series of The Audio Novels with shorter-length audiobooks.

No.	Title	Narrated by	Written by	Featuring	Released
1	"The Time-Splitters"	Peter Purves	Colin Brake	First Doctor, Steven Taylor, Dodo Chaplet	January 2026
2	"Dimension 13"	Jon Culshaw	David Llewellyn	Third Doctor, Liz Shaw, Brigadier Lethbridge-Stewart	January 2026

=== The Audio Novels (2021–present) ===
No.	Title	Narrated by	Written by	Featuring	Released
1	"Scourge of the Cybermen"	Jon Culshaw	Simon Guerrier	Third Doctor, Sarah Jane Smith, Cybermen	July 2021
2	"Watchers"	Matthew Waterhouse	Matthew Waterhouse	Fourth Doctor, Adric, Daleks	January 2022
3	"Emancipation of the Daleks"	Dan Starkey	Jonathan Morris	Twelfth Doctor, Bill Potts, Daleks	July 2022
4	"The Dead Star"	Michael Troughton	Kate Orman	Second Doctor, Ben and Polly	January 2023
5	"Prisoners of London"	Matthew Waterhouse	Matthew Waterhouse	Fifth Doctor, Tegan Jovanka, Nyssa, Adric	July 2023
6	"The Box of Terrors"	Jon Culshaw	Lizzie Hopley	Third Doctor, Fourth Doctor, Sarah Jane, Omega The Six	November 2023
7	"The Chaos Cascade"	Beth Chalmers, Rebecca Root and Dan Starkey	Colin Brake	Twelfth Doctor, Tania Bell, Missy	January 2024
8	"The Lord of Misrule"	Jon Culshaw	Paul Morris	Fourth Doctor, Romana I, Jago & Litefoot	January 2025
9	"The Mirror Matter"	Jon Culshaw	Kate Orman	Third Doctor, Liz Shaw, Brigadier Lethbridge-Stewart	July 2025
10	"The Missing Hour"	Barnaby Edwards	Simon Guerrier	First Doctor, Barbara Wright, Ian Chesterton, Susan Foreman	October 2026
11	"The Bath Chronicles"	Dan Starkey	Dan Starkey	Strax and Jenny	January 2027

=== The Companion Chronicles (2007–present) ===
The character in brackets in the "Featuring" column is who the story is told by.

==== Series 1 (2007) ====
No.	Title	Directed by	Written by	Featuring	Released
1	"Frostfire"	Mark J Thompson	Marc Platt	First Doctor, Steven Taylor (Vicki)	February 2007
2	"Fear of the Daleks"	Mark J Thompson	Patrick Chapman	Second Doctor, Jamie McCrimmon, Daleks (Zoe Heriot)	February 2007
3	"The Blue Tooth"	Mark J Thompson	Nigel Fairs	Third Doctor, The Brigadier, Benton, Mike Yates, Cybermen (Liz Shaw)	February 2007
4	"The Beautiful People"	Mark J Thompson	Jonathan Morris	Fourth Doctor, K9 (Romana II)	February 2007

==== Series 2 (2007–2008) ====
No.	Title	Directed by	Written by	Featuring	Released
1	"Mother Russia"	Nigel Fairs	Marc Platt	First Doctor, Dodo Chaplet (Steven Taylor)	October 2007
2	"Helicon Prime"	Nigel Fairs	Jake Elliot	Second Doctor (Jamie McCrimmon)	November 2007
3	"Old Soldiers"	Nigel Fairs	James Swallow	Third Doctor (The Brigadier)	December 2007
4	"The Catalyst"	Nigel Fairs	Nigel Fairs	Fourth Doctor (Leela)	January 2008

==== Series 3 (2008–2009) ====
No.	Title	Directed by	Written by	Featuring	Released
1	"Here There Be Monsters"	Lisa Bowerman	Andy Lane	First Doctor, Ian Chesterton, Barbara Wright (Susan Foreman)	July 2008
2	"The Great Space Elevator"	Nigel Fairs	Jonathan Morris	Second Doctor, Jamie McCrimmon (Victoria Waterfield)	August 2008
3	"The Doll of Death"	Lisa Bowerman	Marc Platt	Third Doctor, The Brigadier, Benton, Mike Yates (Jo Grant)	September 2008
4	"Empathy Games"	Nigel Fairs	Nigel Fairs	Fourth Doctor (Leela)	October 2008
5	"Home Truths"	Lisa Bowerman	Simon Guerrier	First Doctor, Steven Taylor (Sara Kingdom)	November 2008
6	"The Darkening Eye"	Ken Bentley	Stewart Sheargold	Fifth Doctor, Tegan, Adric, Dar Traders (Nyssa)	December 2008
7	"The Transit of Venus"	Nigel Fairs	Jacqueline Rayner	First Doctor, Susan Foreman, Barbara Wright (Ian Chesterton)	January 2009
8	"The Prisoner's Dilemma"	Lisa Bowerman	Simon Guerrier	Seventh Doctor (Ace)	February 2009
9	"Resistance"	Lisa Bowerman	Steve Lyons	Second Doctor, Ben, Jamie McCrimmon (Polly)	March 2009
10	"The Magician's Oath"	Nigel Fairs	Scott Handcock	Third Doctor, Jo Grant, The Brigadier, Benton (Mike Yates)	April 2009
11	"The Mahogany Murderers"	Lisa Bowerman	Andy Lane	Dr. Tulp (Jago, Litefoot)	May 2009
12	"Stealers from Saiph"	Lisa Bowerman	Nigel Robinson	Fourth Doctor (Romana I)	June 2009

==== Series 4 (2009–2010) ====
No.	Title	Directed by	Written by	Featuring	Released
1	"The Drowned World"	Lisa Bowerman	Simon Guerrier	First Doctor, Steven Taylor (Sara Kingdom)	July 2009
2	"The Glorious Revolution"	Nigel Fairs	Jonathan Morris	Second Doctor, Zoe Heriot (Jamie McCrimmon)	August 2009
3	"The Prisoner of Peladon"	Nicola Bryant	Mark Wright, Cavan Scott	Third Doctor, Ice Warriors, Alpha Centauri (King Peladon)	September 2009
4	"The Pyralis Effect"	Lisa Bowerman	George Mann	Fourth Doctor (Romana II)	October 2009
5	"Ringpullworld"	Neil Roberts	Paul Magrs	Fifth Doctor, Tegan, Huxley (Turlough)	November 2009
6	"Bernice Summerfield and the Criminal Code"	John Ainsworth	Eddie Robson	Seventh Doctor (Benny)	January 2010
7	"The Suffering"	Lisa Bowerman	Jacqueline Rayner	First Doctor (Steven Taylor, Vicki)	February 2010
8	"The Emperor of Eternity"	Lisa Bowerman	Nigel Robinson	Second Doctor (Jamie McCrimmon, Victoria Waterfield)	March 2010
9	"Shadow of the Past"	Lisa Bowerman	Simon Guerrier	Third Doctor, The Brigadier (Liz Shaw)	April 2010
10	"The Time Vampire"	Nigel Fairs	Nigel Fairs	Fourth Doctor (Leela, K9)	May 2010
11	"Night's Black Agents"	Lisa Bowerman	Marty Ross	Sixth Doctor (Jamie McCrimmon)	May 2010
12	"Solitaire"	Nicholas Briggs	John Dorney	Eighth Doctor, Celestial Toymaker (Charley Pollard)	June 2010

==== Series 5 (2010–2011) ====
No.	Title	Directed by	Written by	Featuring	Released
1	"The Guardian of the Solar System"	Lisa Bowerman	Simon Guerrier	First Doctor, Steven Taylor, Mavic Chen (Sara Kingdom)	July 2010
2	"Echoes of Grey"	Lisa Bowerman	John Dorney	Second Doctor, Jamie McCrimmon (Zoe Heriot)	August 2010
3	"Find and Replace"	Lisa Bowerman	Paul Magrs	Third Doctor, Benton (Jo Grant, Iris Wildthyme)	September 2010
4	"The Invasion of E-Space"	Lisa Bowerman	Andrew Smith	Fourth Doctor, Adric (Romana II)	October 2010
5	"A Town Called Fortune"	Lisa Bowerman	Paul Sutton	Sixth Doctor (Evelyn Smythe)	November 2010
6	"Quinnis"	Lisa Bowerman	Marc Platt	First Doctor (Susan Foreman)	December 2010
7	"Peri and the Piscon Paradox"	John Ainsworth	Nev Fountain	Fifth Doctor (Sixth Doctor, Peri Brown)	January 2011
8	"The Perpetual Bond"	Lisa Bowerman	Simon Guerrier	First Doctor (Steven Taylor, Oliver Harper)	February 2011
9	"The Forbidden Time"	Lisa Bowerman	David Lock	Second Doctor, Ben (Polly, Jamie McCrimmon)	March 2011
10	"The Sentinels of the New Dawn"	Lisa Bowerman	Paul Finch	Third Doctor (Liz Shaw)	April 2011
11	"Ferril's Folly"	Lisa Bowerman	Peter Anghelides	Fourth Doctor (Romana I)	May 2011
12	"The Cold Equations"	Lisa Bowerman	Simon Guerrier	First Doctor (Steven Taylor, Oliver Harper)	June 2011

==== Specials (2011) ====
No.	Title	Directed by	Written by	Featuring	Released
1	"The Three Companions"	Lisa Bowerman	Marc Platt	Second Doctor, Third Doctor, Ben, Jamie McCrimmon (Polly, The Brigadier, Brewster)	August 2011
2	"The Mists of Time"	Lisa Bowerman	Jonathan Morris	Third Doctor (Jo Grant)	August 2011
3	"Freakshow"	Lisa Bowerman	Mark Morris	Fifth Doctor, Tegan (Turlough)	August 2011

==== Series 6 (2011–2012) ====
No.	Title	Directed by	Written by	Featuring	Released
1	"Tales from the Vault"	Lisa Bowerman	Jonathan Morris	First Doctor, Second Doctor, Third Doctor, Fourth Doctor, Jamie McCrimmon, Dodo Chaplet (Jo Grant, Romana I, Zoe Heriot, Steven Taylor)	July 2011
2	"The Rocket Men"	Lisa Bowerman	John Dorney	First Doctor, Barbara Wright, Vicki (Ian Chesterton)	August 2011
3	"The Memory Cheats"	Lisa Bowerman	Simon Guerrier	Second Doctor, Jamie McCrimmon (Zoe Heriot)	September 2011
4	"The Many Deaths of Jo Grant"	Lisa Bowerman	Mark Wright, Cavan Scott	Third Doctor, The Brigadier (Jo Grant)	October 2011
5	"The First Wave"	Lisa Bowerman	Simon Guerrier	First Doctor, Vardans (Steven Taylor, Oliver Harper)	November 2011
6	"Beyond the Ultimate Adventure"	Jason Haigh-Ellery	Terrance Dicks	Sixth Doctor, Rutans, Raston Warrior (Crystal, Jason, Sixth Doctor)	December 2011
7	"The Anachronauts"	Ken Bentley	Simon Guerrier	First Doctor (Steven Taylor, Sara Kingdom)	January 2012
8	"The Selachian Gambit"	Lisa Bowerman	Steve Lyons	Second Doctor, Ben (Polly, Jamie McCrimmon)	February 2012
9	"Binary"	Lisa Bowerman	Eddie Robson	Third Doctor (Liz Shaw)	March 2012
10	"The Wanderer"	Lisa Bowerman	Richard Dinnick	First Doctor, Susan Foreman, Barbara Wright (Ian Chesterton)	April 2012
11	"The Jigsaw War"	Lisa Bowerman	Eddie Robson	Second Doctor (Jamie McCrimmon)	May 2012
12	"The Rings of Ikiria"	Ken Bentley	Richard Dinnick	Third Doctor, The Brigadier, Benton (Mike Yates)	June 2012

==== Special (2012) ====
No.	Title	Directed by	Written by	Featuring	Released
1	"The Revenants"	Lisa Bowerman	Ian Potter	First Doctor, Barbara (Ian)	May 2012

==== Series 7 (2012–2013) ====
No.	Title	Directed by	Written by	Featuring	Released
1	"The Time Museum"	Lisa Bowerman	James Goss	First Doctor, Barbara (Ian)	July 2012
2	"The Uncertainty Principle"	Lisa Bowerman	Simon Guerrier	Second Doctor, Jamie McCrimmon (Zoe Heriot)	August 2012
3	"Project: Nirvana"	Ken Bentley	Mark Wright, Cavan Scott	(Seventh Doctor, Lysandra Aristedes, Sally)	September 2012
4	"The Last Post"	Lisa Bowerman	James Goss	Third Doctor, The Brigadier (Liz Shaw)	October 2012
5	"Return of the Rocket Men"	Lisa Bowerman	Matt Fitton	First Doctor, Dodo (Steven)	November 2012
6	"The Child"	Nigel Fairs	Nigel Fairs	Fourth Doctor (Leela)	December 2012
7	"The Flames of Cadiz"	Lisa Bowerman	Marc Platt	First Doctor, Barbara (Ian, Susan)	January 2013
8	"House of Cards"	Lisa Bowerman	Steve Lyons	Second Doctor, Ben (Jamie, Polly)	February 2013
9	"The Scorchies"	Ken Bentley	James Goss	Third Doctor (Jo)	March 2013
10	"The Library of Alexandria"	Lisa Bowerman	Simon Guerrier	First Doctor, Barbara, Susan (Ian)	April 2013
11	"The Apocalypse Mirror"	Lisa Bowerman	Eddie Robson	Second Doctor (Jamie, Zoe)	May 2013
12	"Council of War"	Lisa Bowerman	Simon Barnard and Paul Morris	Third Doctor, The Brigadier (John Benton)	June 2013

==== Series 8 (2013–2014) ====
No.	Title	Directed by	Written by	Featuring	Released
1	"Mastermind"	Ken Bentley	Jonathan Morris	– (The Master)	July 2013
2	"The Alchemists"	Lisa Bowerman	Ian Potter	First Doctor (Susan)	August 2013
3	"Upstairs"	Lisa Bowerman	Mat Coward	First Doctor (Vicki, Steven)	September 2013
4	"Ghost in the Machine"	Louise Jameson	Jonathan Morris	Third Doctor (Jo Grant)	October 2013
5	"The Beginning"	Lisa Bowerman	Marc Platt	First Doctor, Quadrigger Stoyn (Susan Foreman)	November 2013
6	"The Dying Light"	Lisa Bowerman	Nick Wallace	Second Doctor, Quadrigger Stoyn (Jamie McCrimmon, Zoe Heriot)	December 2013
7	"Luna Romana"	Lisa Bowerman	Matt Fitton	Fourth Doctor, Romana I, Quadrigger Stoyn (Romana II, Romana III)	January 2014
8	"The Sleeping City"	Lisa Bowerman	Ian Potter	First Doctor, Barbara, Vicki (Ian Chesterton)	February 2014
9	"Starborn"	Lisa Bowerman	Jacqueline Rayner	First Doctor, Barbara, Ian (Vicki)	March 2014
10	"The War to End All Wars"	Lisa Bowerman	Simon Guerrier	First Doctor, Dodo Chaplet (Steven Taylor)	April 2014
11	"The Elixir of Doom"	Lisa Bowerman	Paul Magrs	Third Doctor, The Eighth Doctor (Jo Grant, Iris Wildthyme)	May 2014
12	"Second Chances"	Lisa Bowerman	John Dorney	Second Doctor, Jamie McCrimmon (Zoe Heriot)	June 2014

==== Series 9: The First Doctor Volume 1 (2015) ====
No.	Title	Directed by	Written by	Featuring	Released
1	"The Sleeping Blood"	Lisa Bowerman	Martin Day	First Doctor (Susan Foreman)	June 2015
2	"The Unwinding World"	Lisa Bowerman	Ian Potter	First Doctor, Ian, Barbara (Vicki)	June 2015
3	"The Founding Fathers"	Lisa Bowerman	Simon Guerrier	First Doctor, Vicki (Steven Taylor)	June 2015
4	"The Locked Room"	Lisa Bowerman	Simon Guerrier	First Doctor, Vicki (Steven Taylor)	June 2015

==== Series 10: The Second Doctor Volume 1 (2016) ====
No.	Title	Directed by	Written by	Featuring	Released
1	"The Mouthless Dead"	Lisa Bowerman	John Pritchard	Second Doctor (Ben, Polly, Jamie)	June 2016
2	"The Story of Extinction"	Lisa Bowerman	Ian Atkins	Second Doctor (Jamie, Victoria)	June 2016
3	"The Integral"	Lisa Bowerman	David Bartlett	Second Doctor (Jamie, Zoe)	June 2016
4	"The Edge"	Lisa Bowerman	Rob Nisbet	Second Doctor, Zoe (Jamie)	June 2016

==== Series 11: The First Doctor Volume 2 (2017) ====
No.	Title	Directed by	Written by	Featuring	Released
1	"Fields of Terror"	Lisa Bowerman	John Pritchard	First Doctor, Steven (Vicki)	June 2017
2	"Across the Darkened City"	Lisa Bowerman	David Bartlett	First Doctor, Vicki, Daleks (Steven)	June 2017
3	"Bonfires of the Vanities"	Lisa Bowerman	Una McCormack	First Doctor (Polly, Ben)	June 2017
4	"The Plague of Dreams"	Lisa Bowerman	Guy Adams	First Doctor (Polly, Ben)	June 2017

==== Series 12: The Second Doctor Volume 2 (2018) ====
No.	Title	Directed by	Written by	Featuring	Released
1	"The Curator's Egg"	Lisa Bowerman	Julian Richards	Second Doctor, (Polly, Ben)	June 2018
2	"Dumb Waiter"	Lisa Bowerman	Rob Nisbet	Second Doctor, Victoria (Jamie, Leela)	June 2018
3	"The Iron Maid"	Lisa Bowerman	John Pritchard	Second Doctor (Jamie, Zoe)	June 2018
4	"The Tactics of Defeat"	Helen Goldwyn	Tony Jones	Second Doctor (Jamie, Zoe)	June 2018

==== Series 13: The First Doctor Volume 3 (2019) ====
No.	Title	Directed by	Written by	Featuring	Released
1	"E is for..."	Lisa Bowerman	Julian Richards	First Doctor, Ian, Barbara (Susan)	September 2019
2	"Daybreak"	Lisa Bowerman	John Prichard	First Doctor (Vicki)	September 2019
3	"The Vardan Invasion of Mirth"	Lisa Bowerman	Paul Morris and Ian Atkins	First Doctor (Steven)	September 2019
4	"The Crumbling Magician"	Lisa Bowerman	Guy Adams	First Doctor (Polly)	September 2019

==== Series 14: The Second Doctor Volume 3 (2022) ====
No.	Title	Directed by	Written by	Featuring	Released
1	"The Death of the Daleks"	Lisa Bowerman	George Mann	Second Doctor (Jamie, Zoe)	April 2022
2	"The Phantom Piper"	Lisa Bowerman	Martin Day	Second Doctor (Jamie, Zoe)	April 2022
3	"The Prints of Denmark"	Nigel Fairs	Paul Morris	Second Doctor (Jamie, Zoe)	April 2022
4	"The Deepest Tragedian"	Nigel Fairs	Penelope Faith	Second Doctor (Jamie, Zoe)	April 2022

==== Series 15: Families (2025) ====
No.	Title	Directed by	Written by	Featuring	Released
1	"The Temple of Light"	Lisa Bowerman	Jonathan Morris	First Doctor, Ian, Barbara (Vicki)	April 2025
2	"Stardust and Ashes"	Lisa Bowerman	Ian Potter	First Doctor (Susan)	April 2025
3	"The White Ship"	Lisa Bowerman	Paul Morris	First Doctor (Steven)	April 2025
4	"The Y Factor"	Lisa Bowerman	Christopher Cooper	First Doctor (Dodo)	April 2025

==== Specials: The Legacy of Time (2026) ====
No.	Title	Directed by	Written by	Featuring	Released
1	"The Kraken of Hagwell"	Nicholas Briggs	Barbara Hambly	First Doctor, the Brigadier, the Master, Tenth Doctor	February 2026
2	"The Heartless Sea"	Nicholas Briggs	Simon Guerrier	Second Doctor, Harry Sullivan, Naomi Cross, First Doctor, Tenth Doctor	February 2026

=== The Early Adventures (2014–2021) ===
==== Series 1 (2014) ====
No.	Serial title	Episode titles	Directed by	Written by	Featuring	Released
1	Domain of the Voord	"The Floating City"	Ken Bentley	Andrew Smith	First Doctor, Susan, Ian, Barbara, Voord	September 2014
1	Domain of the Voord	"Return to Terror"	Ken Bentley	Andrew Smith	First Doctor, Susan, Ian, Barbara, Voord	September 2014
1	Domain of the Voord	"Behind the Mask"	Ken Bentley	Andrew Smith	First Doctor, Susan, Ian, Barbara, Voord	September 2014
1	Domain of the Voord	"Fightback"	Ken Bentley	Andrew Smith	First Doctor, Susan, Ian, Barbara, Voord	September 2014
2	The Doctor's Tale	"The Lord of Misrule"	Ken Bentley	Marc Platt	First Doctor, Ian, Barbara, Vicki	October 2014
2	The Doctor's Tale	"The White Hart"	Ken Bentley	Marc Platt	First Doctor, Ian, Barbara, Vicki	October 2014
2	The Doctor's Tale	"Sanctuary"	Ken Bentley	Marc Platt	First Doctor, Ian, Barbara, Vicki	October 2014
2	The Doctor's Tale	"The Empty Crown"	Ken Bentley	Marc Platt	First Doctor, Ian, Barbara, Vicki	October 2014
3	The Bounty of Ceres	"The Hostile Planet"	Lisa Bowerman	Ian Potter	First Doctor, Vicki, Steven	November 2014
3	The Bounty of Ceres	"The Outer Edge"	Lisa Bowerman	Ian Potter	First Doctor, Vicki, Steven	November 2014
3	The Bounty of Ceres	"An Otherworldly Intelligence"	Lisa Bowerman	Ian Potter	First Doctor, Vicki, Steven	November 2014
3	The Bounty of Ceres	"The Coldest Mind"	Lisa Bowerman	Ian Potter	First Doctor, Vicki, Steven	November 2014
4	An Ordinary Life	"An Ordinary Life"	Ken Bentley	Matt Fitton	First Doctor, Steven, Sara	December 2014
4	An Ordinary Life	"The Unalike"	Ken Bentley	Matt Fitton	First Doctor, Steven, Sara	December 2014
4	An Ordinary Life	"The Sleeping Army"	Ken Bentley	Matt Fitton	First Doctor, Steven, Sara	December 2014
4	An Ordinary Life	"The Enemy Without"	Ken Bentley	Matt Fitton	First Doctor, Steven, Sara	December 2014

==== Series 2 (2015–2016) ====
No.	Title	Directed by	Written by	Featuring	Released
1	"The Yes Men"	Lisa Bowerman	Simon Guerrier	Second Doctor, Polly, Ben, Jamie	September 2015
2	"The Forsaken"	Lisa Bowerman	Justin Richards	Second Doctor, Polly, Ben, Jamie	October 2015
3	"The Black Hole"	Lisa Bowerman	Simon Guerrier	Second Doctor, Jamie, Victoria, the Monk	November 2015
4	"The Isos Network"	Nicholas Briggs	Nicholas Briggs	Second Doctor, Jamie, Zoe, Cybermen	January 2016

==== Series 3 (2016) ====
No.	Serial title	Episode titles	Directed by	Written by	Featuring	Released
1	The Age of Endurance	"Ship of Death"	Ken Bentley	Nick Wallace	First Doctor, Susan, Ian, Barbara	September 2016
1	The Age of Endurance	"Hunters in the Breach"	Ken Bentley	Nick Wallace	First Doctor, Susan, Ian, Barbara	September 2016
1	The Age of Endurance	"A Fight for Survival"	Ken Bentley	Nick Wallace	First Doctor, Susan, Ian, Barbara	September 2016
1	The Age of Endurance	"The End of Endurance"	Ken Bentley	Nick Wallace	First Doctor, Susan, Ian, Barbara	September 2016
2	The Fifth Traveller	"Hunted"	Lisa Bowerman	Philip Lawrence	First Doctor, Ian, Barbara, Vicki, Jospa	October 2016
2	The Fifth Traveller	"Enemy in the Dark"	Lisa Bowerman	Philip Lawrence	First Doctor, Ian, Barbara, Vicki, Jospa	October 2016
2	The Fifth Traveller	"The Sleeping Army"	Lisa Bowerman	Philip Lawrence	First Doctor, Ian, Barbara, Vicki, Jospa	October 2016
2	The Fifth Traveller	"The Boy"	Lisa Bowerman	Philip Lawrence	First Doctor, Ian, Barbara, Vicki, Jospa	October 2016
3	The Ravelli Conspiracy	"A Friend in Need"	Lisa Bowerman	Robert Khan & Tom Salinsky	First Doctor, Vicki, Steven	November 2016
3	The Ravelli Conspiracy	"A Friend in Deed"	Lisa Bowerman	Robert Khan & Tom Salinsky	First Doctor, Vicki, Steven	November 2016
3	The Ravelli Conspiracy	"With Friends Like These..."	Lisa Bowerman	Robert Khan & Tom Salinsky	First Doctor, Vicki, Steven	November 2016
3	The Ravelli Conspiracy	"Who Needs Enemies"	Lisa Bowerman	Robert Khan & Tom Salinsky	First Doctor, Vicki, Steven	November 2016
4	The Sontarans	"The Sontarans"	Lisa Bowerman	Simon Guerrier	First Doctor, Steven, Sara, Sontarans	December 2016
4	The Sontarans	"The Descent"	Lisa Bowerman	Simon Guerrier	First Doctor, Steven, Sara, Sontarans	December 2016
4	The Sontarans	"The Blind City"	Lisa Bowerman	Simon Guerrier	First Doctor, Steven, Sara, Sontarans	December 2016
4	The Sontarans	"The Rule of War"	Lisa Bowerman	Simon Guerrier	First Doctor, Steven, Sara, Sontarans	December 2016

==== Series 4 (2017) ====
No.	Title	Directed by	Written by	Featuring	Released
1	"The Night Witches"	Helen Goldwyn	Roland Moore	Second Doctor, Polly, Ben, Jamie	September 2017
2	"The Outliers"	Lisa Bowerman	Simon Guerrier	Second Doctor, Polly, Ben, Jamie	October 2017
3	"The Morton Legacy"	Lisa Bowerman	Justin Richards	Second Doctor, Polly, Ben, Jamie	November 2017
4	"The Wreck of the World"	Lisa Bowerman	Timothy X Atack	Second Doctor, Jamie, Zoe	December 2017

==== Series 5 (2018) ====
No.	Serial title	Episode titles	Directed by	Written by	Featuring	Released
1	The Dalek Occupation of Winter	"The Chosen Few"	Lisa Bowerman	David K Barnes	First Doctor, Vicki, Steven, Daleks	September 2018
1	The Dalek Occupation of Winter	"Keep Your Enemies Close"	Lisa Bowerman	David K Barnes	First Doctor, Vicki, Steven, Daleks	September 2018
1	The Dalek Occupation of Winter	"The Blood of the Young"	Lisa Bowerman	David K Barnes	First Doctor, Vicki, Steven, Daleks	September 2018
1	The Dalek Occupation of Winter	"A Spark to Light a Flame"	Lisa Bowerman	David K Barnes	First Doctor, Vicki, Steven, Daleks	September 2018
2	An Ideal World	"The Weather Makers"	Lisa Bowerman	Ian Potter	First Doctor, Vicki, Steven	October 2018
2	An Ideal World	"The Life Below"	Lisa Bowerman	Ian Potter	First Doctor, Vicki, Steven	October 2018
2	An Ideal World	"A World in Revolt"	Lisa Bowerman	Ian Potter	First Doctor, Vicki, Steven	October 2018
2	An Ideal World	"A Fight for the Future"	Lisa Bowerman	Ian Potter	First Doctor, Vicki, Steven	October 2018
3	Entanglement	"The Wall of Death"	Lisa Bowerman	Robert Khan & Thomas Salinsky	First Doctor, Vicki, Steven	November 2018
3	Entanglement	"Photographic Evidence"	Lisa Bowerman	Robert Khan & Thomas Salinsky	First Doctor, Vicki, Steven	November 2018
3	Entanglement	"The Hour of Voting"	Lisa Bowerman	Robert Khan & Thomas Salinsky	First Doctor, Vicki, Steven	November 2018
3	Entanglement	"The Entanglement Machine"	Lisa Bowerman	Robert Khan & Thomas Salinsky	First Doctor, Vicki, Steven	November 2018
4	The Crash of the UK-201	"Return to Yesterday"	Lisa Bowerman	Jonathan Morris	First Doctor, Vicki, Steven	December 2018
4	The Crash of the UK-201	"The Road Not Taken"	Lisa Bowerman	Jonathan Morris	First Doctor, Vicki, Steven	December 2018
4	The Crash of the UK-201	"Bid Time Return"	Lisa Bowerman	Jonathan Morris	First Doctor, Vicki, Steven	December 2018
4	The Crash of the UK-201	"The Crash"	Lisa Bowerman	Jonathan Morris	First Doctor, Vicki, Steven	December 2018

==== Series 6 (2019) ====
No.	Title	Directed by	Written by	Featuring	Released
1	"The Home Guard"	Lisa Bowerman	Simon Guerrier	Second Doctor, Polly, Jamie, Ben, The Master	November 2019
2	"Daughter of the Gods"	Lisa Bowerman	David K Barnes	First Doctor, Second Doctor, Zoe, Jamie, Katarina, Steven	November 2019

==== Series 7 (2021) ====
No.	Serial title	Episode titles	Directed by	Written by	Featuring	Released
1	After the Daleks	"A New Life"	Lisa Bowerman	Roland Moore	Susan, David Campbell, Jenny Chaplin, Daleks	August 2021
1	After the Daleks	"The Balance of Power"	Lisa Bowerman	Roland Moore	Susan, David Campbell, Jenny Chaplin, Daleks	August 2021
1	After the Daleks	"Salvation of the Robomen"	Lisa Bowerman	Roland Moore	Susan, David Campbell, Jenny Chaplin, Daleks	August 2021
1	After the Daleks	"Susan's Choice"	Lisa Bowerman	Roland Moore	Susan, David Campbell, Jenny Chaplin, Daleks	August 2021
2	The Secrets of Det-Sen	"The Abominable Snowmen"	Lisa Bowerman	Andy Frankham-Allen	First Doctor, Steven, Dodo, Yeti	August 2021
2	The Secrets of Det-Sen	"Guru Rinpoche Day"	Lisa Bowerman	Andy Frankham-Allen	First Doctor, Steven, Dodo, Yeti	August 2021
2	The Secrets of Det-Sen	"The Bandits"	Lisa Bowerman	Andy Frankham-Allen	First Doctor, Steven, Dodo, Yeti	August 2021
2	The Secrets of Det-Sen	"The Ghanta of Det-Sen"	Lisa Bowerman	Andy Frankham-Allen	First Doctor, Steven, Dodo, Yeti	August 2021

=== The Lost Stories (2009–present) ===
==== Series 1 (2009–2010) ====
No.	Title	Directed by	Written by	Featuring	Released
1	"The Nightmare Fair"	John Ainsworth	Graham Williams	Sixth Doctor, Peri, Celestial Toymaker	November 2009
2	"Mission to Magnus"	Lisa Bowerman	Philip Martin	Sixth Doctor, Peri, Ice Warriors, Sil	December 2009
3	"Leviathan"	Ken Bentley	Brian Finch and Paul Finch	Sixth Doctor, Peri	January 2010
4	"The Hollows of Time"	John Ainsworth	Christopher H. Bidmead	Sixth Doctor, Peri, Tractators	February 2010
5	"Paradise 5"	Barnaby Edwards	P.J. Hammond and Andy Lane	Sixth Doctor, Peri, Cherubs, Elohim	March 2010
6	"Point of Entry"	John Ainsworth	Barbara Clegg and Marc Platt	Sixth Doctor, Peri, Omnim	April 2010
7	"The Song of Megaptera"	John Ainsworth	Pat Mills	Sixth Doctor, Peri	May 2010
8	"The Macros"	John Ainsworth	Ingrid Pitt and Tony Rudlin	Sixth Doctor, Peri	June 2010

==== Series 2 (2010–2011) ====
No.	Title	Directed by	Written by	Featuring	Released
1	The First Doctor Boxset "Farewell, Great Macedon" "The Fragile Yellow Arc of Fragrance"	Lisa Bowerman; John Ainsworth	Moris Farhi, adapted by Nigel Robinson	First Doctor, Susan Foreman, Ian Chesterton, Barbara Wright	November 2010
2	The Second Doctor Boxset "Prison in Space" "The Destroyers"	Lisa Bowerman	Dick Sharples & Terry Nation, adapted by Simon Guerrier, Nicholas Briggs & John Dorney	Second Doctor, Jamie McCrimmon, Zoe Heriot, Sara Kingdom, Daleks	December 2010
3	"Thin Ice"	Ken Bentley	Marc Platt	Seventh Doctor, Ace, Ice Warriors	April 2011
4	"Crime of the Century"	Ken Bentley	Andrew Cartmel	Seventh Doctor, Ace, Raine	May 2011
5	"Animal"	Ken Bentley	Andrew Cartmel	Seventh Doctor, Ace, Raine, Brigadier Bambera	June 2011
6	"Earth Aid"	Ken Bentley	Ben Aaronovitch & Andrew Cartmel	Seventh Doctor, Ace, Raine	July 2011

==== Fourth Doctor Lost Stories (2012) ====
No.	Title	Directed by	Written by	Featuring	Released
–	The Fourth Doctor Boxset "The Foe from the Future" "The Valley of Death"	Ken Bentley	Robert Banks Stewart, John Dorney, Philip Hinchcliffe and Jonathan Morris	Fourth Doctor, Leela	January 2012

==== Series 3 (2011–2012) ====
No.	Title	Directed by	Written by	Featuring	Released
1	"The Elite"	Ken Bentley	Barbara Clegg and John Dorney	Fifth Doctor, Tegan, Nyssa, Dalek	October 2011
2	"Hexagora"	Ken Bentley	Paul Finch, from a story by Peter Ling & Hazel Adair	Fifth Doctor, Tegan, Nyssa	November 2011
3	"The Children of Seth"	Ken Bentley	Christopher Bailey and Marc Platt	Fifth Doctor, Tegan, Nyssa	December 2011
4	"The Guardians of Prophecy"	Ken Bentley	Johnny Byrne and Jonathan Morris	Sixth Doctor, Peri, Melkurs	May 2012
5	"Power Play"	Ken Bentley	Gary Hopkins	Sixth Doctor, Peri, Victoria	June 2012
6	"The First Sontarans"	Ken Bentley	Andrew Smith	Sixth Doctor, Peri, Sontarans, Rutans	July 2012
7	"The Masters of Luxor"	Lisa Bowerman	Anthony Coburn, adapted by Nigel Robinson	First Doctor, Susan Foreman, Ian Chesterton, Barbara Wright	August 2012
8	"The Rosemariners"	Lisa Bowerman	Donald Tosh	Second Doctor, Jamie McCrimmon, Zoe Heriot	September 2012

==== Series 4 (2013) ====
No.	Title	Directed by	Written by	Featuring	Released
1	"The Dark Planet"	Ken Bentley	Brian Hayles, adapted by Matt Fitton	First Doctor, Vicki, Ian Chesterton, Barbara Wright	September 2013
2	"The Queen of Time"	Lisa Bowerman	Brian Hayles, adapted by Catherine Harvey	Second Doctor, Jamie McCrimmon, Zoe Heriot, Hecuba	October 2013
3	"Lords of the Red Planet"	Lisa Bowerman	Brian Hayles, adapted by John Dorney	Second Doctor, Jamie McCrimmon, Zoe Heriot, Ice Warriors	November 2013
4	"The Mega"	Ken Bentley	Bill Strutton, adapted by Simon Guerrier	Third Doctor, Jo Grant, Mike Yates	December 2013

==== Series 5 (2019) ====
No.	Title	Directed by	Written by	Featuring	Released
1	"Nightmare Country"	Ken Bentley	Stephen Gallagher	Fifth Doctor, Tegan, Turlough	November 2019
2	"The Ultimate Evil"	Helen Goldwyn	Wally K. Daly	Sixth Doctor, Peri	November 2019

==== Series 6 (2021) ====
No.	Title	Directed by	Written by	Featuring	Released
1	"Return of the Cybermen"	Nicholas Briggs	Gerry Davis, adapted by John Dorney	Fourth Doctor, Harry Sullivan, Sarah Jane Smith	March 2021
2	"The Doomsday Contract"	Nicholas Briggs	John Lloyd, adapted by Nev Fountain	Fourth Doctor, Romana II and K9 Mk 2	March 2021

==== Special (2022) ====
No.	Title	Directed by	Written by	Featuring	Released
1	"Mind of the Hodiac"	Scott Handcock	Russell T Davies and Scott Handcock	Sixth Doctor, Mel Bush	March 2022

==== Series 7 (2023) ====
No.	Title	Directed by	Written by	Featuring	Released
1	"Daleks! Genesis of Terror"	Samuel Clemens	Terry Nation, additional dialogue by Simon Guerrier	Fourth Doctor, Harry Sullivan, Sarah Jane Smith, Davros, Daleks	May 2023
2	"Doctor Who and The Ark"	Samuel Clemens	John Lucarotti, adapted by Jonathan Morris	Fourth Doctor, Harry Sullivan, Sarah Jane Smith	June 2023

==== Series 8 (2024) ====
No.	Title	Directed by	Written by	Featuring	Released
1	"Operation Werewolf"	David O'Mahony	Douglas Camfield & Robert Kitts, Adapted by Jonathan Morris	Second Doctor, Jamie McCrimmon, Zoe Heriot	July 2024
2	"Deathworld"	David O'Mahony	Bob Baker & Dave Martin, adapted by John Dorney	Third Doctor, Second Doctor, First Doctor, Jo Grant, Brigadier Lethbridge-Stewart, Jamie McCrimmon	August 2024

==== Series 9 (2025) ====
No.	Title	Directed by	Written by	Featuring	Released
1	"Genesis of the Cybermen"	David O'Mahony	Gerry Davis, Adapted by David K. Barnes	Fifth Doctor, Tegan, Nyssa, Adric, Cybermen	March 2025
2	"Alixion"	David O'Mahony	Robin Mukherjee	Seventh Doctor, Ace	September 2025

=== The Monthly Adventures (1999–2021) ===
Doctor Who: The Monthly Adventures (previously known as the "Main Range") is a series of full-cast audiobook adventures based on the British science fiction television programme Doctor Who, produced by Nicholas Briggs and Big Finish Productions and starring one of the original actors to play The Doctor on television in the classic era of the programme. By 2018 the range featured the Fifth, Sixth and Seventh Doctors, with a pattern of thirteen releases per year, one every month with two in September or December. In May 2020, Big Finish announced that the Monthly Range would conclude with its 275th issue in March 2021, to be replaced with regular releases of each Doctor in their own boxsets throughout the year from January 2022.

Big Finish Productions began producing audio dramas featuring the Fifth, Sixth, and Seventh Doctors, starting with The Sirens of Time in July 1999. This continued through to 2000, and from 2001 to 2007, the main range also included releases featuring the Eighth Doctor with his companions Charley Pollard and C'rizz, but these were ended due to the simultaneously running Eighth Doctor Adventures, which ran from 2006 to 2011 and featured companion Lucie Miller. From 2008 to late 2011, only one Eighth Doctor release was produced for the main range: The Company of Friends, featuring companions from other media to the audio plays, and the historical figure Mary Shelley. The Eighth Doctor returned to the main range in a trilogy of adventures with Mary Shelley in October 2011.

=== The New Adventures of Bernice Summerfield (2014–present) ===
==== Volume 1 (2014) ====
No.	Title	Directed by	Written by	Featuring	Released
1	"The Revolution"	Scott Handcock	Nev Fountain	Seventh Doctor	June 2014
2	"Good Night, Sweet Ladies"	Scott Handcock	Una McCormack	–	June 2014
3	"Random Ghosts"	Scott Handcock	Guy Adams	Ace	June 2014
4	"The Lights of Skaro"	Scott Handcock	James Goss	Seventh Doctor, Ace	June 2014

==== Volume 2: The Triumph of Sutekh (2015) ====
No.	Title	Directed by	Written by	Featuring	Released
1	"The Pyramid of Sutekh"	Scott Handcock	Guy Adams	Seventh Doctor, Ace	June 2015
2	"The Vaults of Osiris"	Scott Handcock	Justin Richards	Seventh Doctor, Ace	June 2015
3	"The Eye of Horus"	Scott Handcock	James Goss	Seventh Doctor, Ace	June 2015
4	"The Tears of Isis"	Scott Handcock	Una McCormack	Seventh Doctor, Ace	June 2015

==== Volume 3: The Unbound Universe (2016) ====
No.	Title	Directed by	Written by	Featuring	Released
1	"The Library in the Body"	Scott Handcock	James Goss	The Doctor ( Unbound)	August 2016
2	"Planet X"	Scott Handcock	Guy Adams	The Doctor (Unbound)	August 2016
3	"The Very Dark Thing"	Scott Handcock	Una McCormack	The Doctor (Unbound)	August 2016
4	"The Emporium at the End"	Scott Handcock	Emma Reeves	The Doctor (Unbound), The Master (Unbound)	August 2016

==== Volume 4: The Ruler of the Universe (2017) ====
No.	Title	Directed by	Written by	Featuring	Released
1	"The City and the Clock"	Scott Handcock	Guy Adams	The Doctor (Unbound)	September 2017
2	"Asking for a Friend"	Scott Handcock	James Goss	The Doctor (Unbound)	September 2017
3	"Truant"	Scott Handcock	Guy Adams	The Doctor (Unbound)	September 2017
4	"The True Saviour of the Universe"	Scott Handcock	James Goss	The Doctor (Unbound), The Master (Unbound)	September 2017

==== Volume 5: Buried Memories (2019) ====
No.	Title	Directed by	Written by	Featuring	Released
1	"Pride of the Lampian"	Scott Handcock	Alyson Leeds	The Doctor (Unbound)	September 2019
2	"Clear History"	Scott Handcock	Doris V Sutherland	The Doctor (Unbound)	September 2019
3	"Dead and Breakfast"	Scott Handcock	April McCaffrey	The Doctor (Unbound)	September 2019
4	"Burrowed Time"	Scott Handcock	Lani Woodward	The Doctor (Unbound)	September 2019

==== Volume 6: Lost in Translation (2020) ====
No.	Title	Directed by	Written by	Featuring	Released
1	"Have I Told You Lately?"	Scott Handcock	Tim Foley	The Doctor (Unbound)	September 2020
2	"The Undying Truth"	Scott Handcock	JA Prentice	The Doctor (Unbound)	September 2020
3	"Inertia"	Scott Handcock	James Goss	The Doctor (Unbound)	September 2020
4	"Gallifrey"	Scott Handcock	Guy Adams & AK Benedict	The Doctor (Unbound)	September 2020

==== Volume 7: Blood & Steel (2022) ====
No.	Title	Directed by	Written by	Featuring	Released
1	"Wilkommen"	Scott Handcock	James Goss	The Doctor (Unbound), Cybermen	September 2022
2	"Wulf"	Scott Handcock	Aaron Lamont	The Doctor (Unbound)	September 2022
3	"Ubermensch"	Scott Handcock	Rochana Patel	The Doctor (Unbound)	September 2022
4	"Auf Wiedersehen"	Scott Handcock	Victoria Saxton	The Doctor (Unbound)	September 2022

==== Volume 8: The Eternity Club (2024) ====
No.	Title	Directed by	Written by	Featuring	Released
Part 1
1	"The Armageddon Chair"	David O'Mahony	James Goss	Bernice Summerfield, Secretary Pym, The Oldest, Starll	September 2024
2	"Triumph of the Drahvin"	David O'Mahony	James Goss	Bernice Summerfield, Secretary Pym, The Oldest, Starll	September 2024
Part 2
3	"Rhubarb"	David O'Mahony	Tim Foley	Bernice Summerfield, Secretary Pym, The Oldest, Starll	October 2024
4	"Please Retain Your Ticket for the Cloakroom"	David O'Mahony	Tim Foley	Bernice Summerfield, Secretary Pym, The Oldest, Starll	October 2024
Part 3
5	"The Terrible Shame of a Tree"	David O'Mahony	James Goss	Bernice Summerfield, Secretary Pym, The Oldest, Alkaran, Siras	November 2024
6	"Mr Pym has an Adventure"	David O'Mahony	James Goss	Bernice Summerfield, Secretary Pym, The Oldest, Alkaran, Siras	November 2024
Part 4
7	"Sanctuary"	David O'Mahony	Tim Foley	Bernice Summerfield, Secretary Pym, The Oldest	December 2024
8	"Liturgy of Death"	David O'Mahony	Tim Foley	Bernice Summerfield, Secretary Pym, The Oldest	December 2024

==== Volume 9: The Dalek Eternity (2025) ====
No.	Title	Directed by	Written by	Featuring	Released
Part 1
1	"The Lonely Bomb"	Scott Handcock	James Goss	Bernice Summerfield, Daleks	September 2025
2	"Satrap"	Scott Handcock	Felicia Baker	Bernice Summerfield, Daleks	September 2025
Part 2
3	"The Winner’s Tale"	Scott Handcock	Alex Hewitt	Bernice Summerfield, Daleks	October 2025
4	"Oversoul"	Scott Handcock	Melissa F. Olson	Bernice Summerfield, Daleks	October 2025
Part 3
5	"Quisling"	Scott Handcock	Sophia McDougall	Bernice Summerfield, Daleks	November 2025
6	"We Don’t Talk About Mavic Chen"	Scott Handcock	Tim Foley	Bernice Summerfield, Daleks	November 2025
Part 4
7	"Vizier"	Scott Handcock	Patrick O'Connor	Bernice Summerfield, Daleks	December 2025
8	"Emperor"	Scott Handcock	Ash Darby	Bernice Summerfield, Daleks	December 2025

=== The Novel Adaptations (2012–present) ===
In 2012 Big Finish began producing adaptations of select novels from the Virgin New Adventures and Virgin Missing Adventures novel ranges.

No.	Title	Directed by	Written by	Featuring	Released
1	"Love and War"	Gary Russell	Paul Cornell, adapted by Jacqueline Rayner	Seventh Doctor, Ace, Bernice Summerfield	October 2012
2	"The Highest Science"	Scott Handcock	Gareth Roberts, adapted by Jacqueline Rayner	Seventh Doctor, Benny	December 2014
3	"The Romance of Crime"	Nicholas Briggs	Gareth Roberts, adapted by John Dorney	Fourth Doctor, Romana II, K9	January 2015
4	"The English Way of Death"	Nicholas Briggs	Gareth Roberts, adapted by John Dorney	Fourth Doctor, Romana II, K9	January 2015
5	"The Well-Mannered War"	Ken Bentley	Gareth Roberts, adapted by John Dorney	Fourth Doctor, Romana II, K9	April 2015
6	"Damaged Goods"	Ken Bentley	Russell T Davies, adapted by Jonathan Morris	Seventh Doctor, Chris Cwej, Roz Forrester	April 2015
7	"Theatre of War"	Scott Handcock	Justin Richards	Seventh Doctor, Ace, Benny	December 2015
8	"All-Consuming Fire"	Scott Handcock	Andy Lane, adapted by Guy Adams	Seventh Doctor, Ace, Benny	December 2015
9	"Nightshade"	Scott Handcock	Mark Gatiss, adapted by Kyle C. Szikora	Seventh Doctor, Ace	April 2016
10	"Original Sin"	Ken Bentley	Andy Lane, adapted by John Dorney	Seventh Doctor, Benny, Chris, Roz	December 2016
11	"Cold Fusion"	Jamie Anderson	Lance Parkin	Fifth Doctor, Seventh Doctor, Adric, Nyssa, Tegan Jovanka, Chris, Roz	December 2016
12	"Goth Opera"	David O'Mahony	Paul Cornell, adapted by Lizbeth Myles	Fifth Doctor, Nyssa, Tegan, Rassilon	July 2024

=== Philip Hinchcliffe Presents (2014–2021) ===
No.	Title	Directed by	Written by	Featuring	Released
1	"The Ghosts of Gralstead" "The Devil's Armada"	Ken Bentley	Philip Hinchcliffe, adapted by Marc Platt	Fourth Doctor, Leela	September 2014
2	"The Genesis Chamber"	Ken Bentley	Philip Hinchcliffe, adapted by Marc Platt	Fourth Doctor, Leela	September 2016
3	"The Helm of Awe"	Ken Bentley	Philip Hinchcliffe, adapted by Marc Platt	Fourth Doctor, Leela	March 2017
4	"The God of Phantoms"	Ken Bentley	Philip Hinchcliffe, adapted by Marc Platt	Fourth Doctor, Leela	August 2021

=== Short Trips (2009–present) ===
The person in brackets in the "Featuring" column is who the story is read by.

==== Single Short Trips (2009–2021) ====
The releases listed below were single releases made available by Big Finish as subscriber and magazine exclusives and podcasts. Starting from September 2016, Big Finish is releasing these exclusives to general customers under the banner, Short Trips Rarities. There will be at least a two-year delay between a story's subscriber exclusive release and its wider general release, in order to still keep these an incentive to subscribers of the main range.

Title	Read by	Written by	Featuring	Released
"One Small Step"	Nicholas Briggs	Nicholas Briggs	Second Doctor, Jamie McCrimmon, Zoe Heriot	January 2009
"Museum Peace"	Nicholas Briggs	James Swallow	Eighth Doctor, Kalendorf	November 2009 (MR 128)
"The Doctor's First XI"	Stephen Critchlow	Ian Atkins	Fourth Doctor, Romana I	March 2010 (MR 132)
"The Switching"	Duncan Wisbey	Simon Guerrier	Third Doctor, Jo Grant, The Brigadier, Mike Yates, Sergeant Benton	June 2010 (MR 135)
"Lepidoptery for Beginners"	Duncan Wisbey	John Dorney	Second Doctor, Jamie, Zoe	September 2010 (MR 138 & MR 139)
"The Little Drummer Boy"	Beth Chalmers	Eddie Robson	First Doctor, Steven Taylor, Sara Kingdom	December 2010 (MR 142)
"Sound the Siren And I'll Come To You Comrade"	Stephen Critchlow	John Pritchard	Fourth Doctor, Leela	March 2011 (MR 145)
"Twilight's End"	Beth Chalmers	Cavan Scott; Mark Wright	Seventh Doctor, Nimrod	June 2011 (MR 148)
"Neptune"	Beth Chalmers	Richard Dinnick	Third Doctor, Sarah Jane	September 2011 (MR 151 & MR 152)
"Lant Land"	Duncan Wisbey	Jonathan Morris	Fifth Doctor, Tegan, Turlough	December 2011 (MR 155)
"Breadcrumbs"	John Banks	James Moran	Fourth Doctor, Romana II	March 2012 (MR 158)
"Intuition"	Stephen Critchlow	Rob Nisbet	Sixth Doctor, Mel	June 2012 (MR 161)
"A Room With No View"	Stephen Critchlow	David Bartlett	Fifth Doctor, Peri	September 2012 (MR 164 & MR 165)
"Only Connect"	John Banks	Andy Lane	Fourth Doctor, Sarah Jane	December 2012 (MR 168)
"The Young Lions"	Stephen Critchlow	Alice Cavender	Eighth Doctor, Lucie	March 2013 (MR 171)
"Crystal Ball"	Stephen Critchlow	Rob Nisbet	Seventh Doctor, Ace	June 2013 (MR 174)
"Methuselah"	John Banks	George Mann	Fifth Doctor, Peri	September 2013 (MR 177 & MR 178)
"Tweaker"	John Banks	Dan Abnett	Fifth Doctor, Nyssa	December 2013 (MR 181)
"The Piltdown Men"	Hugh Ross	Paul Dale Smith	Second Doctor	March 2014 (MR 184)
"Late Night Shopping"	Hugh Ross	Matt Fitton	Eighth Doctor, Lucie	June 2014 (MR 187)
"Waiting for Gadot"	Hugh Ross	John Dorney	Third Doctor, Fourth Doctor, Jo	September 2014 (MR 190 & MR 191)
"A Home From Home"	Stephen Critchlow	Nick Wallace	Third Doctor, Liz, Benton	December 2014 (MR 194)
"String Theory"	Stephen Critchlow	Kini Brown	Fourth Doctor, Leela	March 2015 (MR 197)
"Sphinx Lightning"	Stephen Critchlow	John Pritchard	Third Doctor, Jo	June 2015 (MR 200)
"The Warren Legacy"	Stephen Critchlow	Julian Richards	Fourth Doctor, Romana I	September 2015 (MR 203 & MR 204)
"The Toy"	Sarah Sutton	Nigel Fairs	Fifth Doctor, Nyssa, Tegan, Adric	October 2015 (Issues 4 & 5 of The Complete History)
"The Caves of Erith"	Stephen Critchlow	Alice Cavender	Eighth Doctor, Lucie	December 2015 (MR 207)
"The Horror at Bletchington Station"	Stephen Critchlow	Chris Wing	First Doctor, Dodo	March 2016 (MR 210)
"The Monkey House"	Stephen Critchlow	Nic Ford	Fifth Doctor, Tegan, Turlough, Nyssa	June 2016 (MR 213)
"The Shrine of Sorrows"	Stephen Critchlow	Julian Richards	Seventh Doctor, Ace	September 2016 (MR 216)
"The Christmas Dimension"	Stephen Critchlow	Rob Nisbet	Third Doctor, Liz, Benton	December 2016 (MR 219 & MR 220)
"Collector's Item"	Stephen Critchlow	Paul J Salmanoff	Fourth Doctor, Sarah	March 2017 (MR 223)
"The Horror of Hy-Brasil"	Stephen Critchlow	Russell McGee	Second Doctor, Jamie, Zoe	June 2017 (MR 226)
"Helmstone"	Stephen Critchlow	Tony Jones	First Doctor, Steven	September 2017 (MR 229 & MR 230)
"The Night Before Christmas"	Stephen Critchlow	Nic Ford	Seventh Doctor	December 2017 (MR 233)
"Mission Improbable"	Stephen Critchlow	Chris Wing	Sixth Doctor, Evelyn Smythe	March 2018 (MR 236)
"Taken For Granted"	Stephen Critchlow	Ian Hidewell	Third Doctor, Jo Grant, Benton	June 2018 (MR 239)
"The Smallest Battle"	Stephen Critchlow	Stephen Osbourne	Fourth Doctor, Leela	September 2018 (MR 242)
"Tuesday"	Stephen Critchlow	Tony Jones	Eighth Doctor, Harry Sullivan	December 2018 (MR 245 & MR 246)
"Loud and Proud"	Stephen Critchlow	Andrew Allen	Sixth Doctor, Mel	March 2019 (MR 249)
"Still Life"	Stephen Critchlow	Max Curtis	Third Doctor, Jo Grant	June 2019 (MR 252)
"An Ocean of Sawdust"	Stephen Critchlow	Paul Starkey	Eighth Doctor	September 2019 (MR 255 & MR 256)
"A Song For Running"	Stephen Critchlow	Fio Trethewey	Twelfth Doctor	December 2019 (MR 259)
"Not Forgotten"	Stephen Critchlow	Benjamin Holland-Smith	Sixth Doctor, Peri	March 2020 (MR 262)
"Home Again, Home Again"	Stephen Critchlow	Felecia Barker	First Doctor, Susan, Barbara, Ian	June 2020 (MR 265)
"The Beast of Muir"	John Banks	Nicole Petit	Fourth Doctor, Leela	September 2020 (MR 268)
"Crime at the Cinema"	John Banks	MH Norris	Third Doctor, Sarah Jane Smith	December 2020 (MR 271 & MR 272)
"Soul Music"	John Banks	Victoria Saxton	Tenth Doctor	March 2021 (MR 275)

==== Paul Spragg Memorial Short Trips (2016–present) ====
The annual Paul Spragg Memorial Short Trip will continue to be released individually.

No.	Title	Directed by	Written by	Featuring	Released
6X	"Forever Fallen"	Neil Gardner	Joshua Wanisko	Seventh Doctor, Ace (Nicholas Briggs)	December 2016
7X	"Landbound"	Neil Gardner	Selim Ulug	Third Doctor (Nicholas Briggs)	December 2017
8X	"The Last Day at Work"	Alfie Shaw	Harry Draper	Second Doctor, Jamie (Nicholas Briggs)	December 2018
9X	"The Best Laid Plans"	Nicholas Briggs	Ben Tedds	Twelfth Doctor (Jacob Dudman)	December 2019
10X	"Free Speech"	Nicholas Briggs	Eugenie Pusenjak	Tenth Doctor (Jacob Dudman)	December 2020
11X	"The Lichyrwick Abomination"	Nicholas Briggs	Joe Vevers	Ninth Doctor, Malcolm (Jacob Dudman)	December 2021
12X	"The World Tree"	TBD	Nick Slawicz	Eleventh Doctor, Nora (Lisa Bowerman)	December 2022
13X23	"The Hoxteth Time Capsule"	TBD	Paul Davis	Sixth Doctor, George (Colin Baker)	December 2023
13X24	"War Stories"	TBD	Patrick Ross	Twelfth Doctor, Bill Potts (Alan Cox)	December 2024
14X	"The Wednesday That Wasn't"	TBD	Luke Hollands	Thirteenth Doctor, Graham, Yasmin, Ryan (Clare Corbett)	December 2025
14X26	"The Underwater Prison"	Peter Anghelides	Daniel Tout	First Doctor (Stephen Noonan)	December 2026

==== Volume 1 (2010) ====
No.	Title	Directed by	Written by	Featuring	Released
1	"Rise and Fall"	Nicholas Briggs, Ken Bentley	George Mann	First Doctor, Susan, Ian, Barbara (William Russell)	November 2010
2	"A Stain of Red in the Sand"	Nicholas Briggs, Ken Bentley	David A McEwan	Second Doctor, Zoe (David Troughton)	November 2010
3	"A True Gentleman"	Nicholas Briggs, Ken Bentley	Jamie Hailstone	Third Doctor (Katy Manning)	November 2010
4	"Death-Dealer"	Nicholas Briggs, Ken Bentley	Damian Sawyer	Fourth Doctor, Leela (Louise Jameson)	November 2010
5	"The Deep"	Nicholas Briggs, Ken Bentley	Ally Kennen	Fifth Doctor, Nyssa (Peter Davison)	November 2010
6	"The Wings of a Butterfly"	Nicholas Briggs, Ken Bentley	Colin Baker	Sixth Doctor (Colin Baker)	November 2010
7	"Police and Shreeves"	Nicholas Briggs, Ken Bentley	Adam Smith	Seventh Doctor, Ace (Sophie Aldred)	November 2010
8	"Running Out of Time"	Nicholas Briggs, Ken Bentley	Dorothy Koomson	Eighth Doctor (India Fisher)	November 2010

==== Volume 2 (2011) ====
No.	Title	Directed by	Written by	Featuring	Released
1	"1963"	Nicholas Briggs, Ken Bentley	Niall Boyce	First Doctor, Ian, Barbara, Vicki (William Russell)	February 2011
2	"The Way Forwards"	Nicholas Briggs, Ken Bentley	Steve Case	Second Doctor, Victoria (David Troughton)	February 2011
3	"Walls of Confinement"	Nicholas Briggs, Ken Bentley	Lawrence Conquest	Third Doctor, Liz, the Brigadier (Katy Manning)	February 2011
4	"Chain Reaction"	Nicholas Briggs, Ken Bentley	Darren Goldsmith	Fourth Doctor, Sarah Jane (Louise Jameson)	February 2011
5	"Sock-Pig"	Nicholas Briggs, Ken Bentley	Sharon Cobb & Iain Keiller	Fifth Doctor (Peter Davison)	February 2011
6	"The Doctor's Coat"	Nicholas Briggs, Ken Bentley	John Bromley	Sixth Doctor (Colin Baker)	February 2011
7	"Critical Mass"	Nicholas Briggs, Ken Bentley	James Moran	Seventh Doctor, Ace (Sophie Aldred)	February 2011
8	"Letting Go"	Nicholas Briggs, Ken Bentley	Simon Guerrier	Eighth Doctor, Charley (India Fisher)	February 2011

==== Volume 3 (2011) ====
No.	Title	Directed by	Written by	Featuring	Released
1	"Seven to One"	Nicholas Briggs, Ken Bentley	Simon Paul Miller	First Doctor, Second Doctor, Third Doctor, Fourth Doctor, Fifth Doctor, Sixth Doctor, Seventh Doctor (Nicholas Briggs, William Russell)	May 2011
2	"The Five Dimensional Man"	Nicholas Briggs, Ken Bentley	Kate Orman	Second Doctor, Zoe, Jamie (David Troughton)	May 2011
3	"Pop Up"	Nicholas Briggs, Ken Bentley	Dave Curran	Third Doctor, Jo (Katy Manning)	May 2011
4	"The Wondrous Box"	Nicholas Briggs, Ken Bentley	Juliet Boyd	Fourth Doctor, Sarah Jane (Louise Jameson)	May 2011
5	"Wet Walls"	Nicholas Briggs, Ken Bentley	Mathilde Madden	Fifth Doctor, Peri (Peter Davison)	May 2011
6	"Murmurs of Earth"	Nicholas Briggs, Ken Bentley	Michael Deacon, Jamie Middleton & Chris Wraight	Sixth Doctor, Peri (Colin Baker)	May 2011
7	"The Riparian Ripper"	Nicholas Briggs, Ken Bentley	Andrew Cartmel	Seventh Doctor, Ace (Sophie Aldred)	May 2011
8	"All the Fun of the Fair"	Nicholas Briggs, Ken Bentley	Bev Conway	Eighth Doctor, Lucie (India Fisher)	May 2011

==== Volume 4 (2011) ====
No.	Title	Directed by	Written by	Featuring	Released
1	"A Star is Born"	Nicholas Briggs, Ken Bentley	Richard Dinnick	First Doctor, Susan, Barbara, Ian (William Russell)	August 2011
2	"Penny Wise, Pound Foolish"	Nicholas Briggs, Ken Bentley	Foster Marks	Second Doctor, Jamie, Zoe (David Troughton)	August 2011
3	"Lost in the Wakefield Triangle"	Nicholas Briggs, Ken Bentley	Vin Marsden Hendrick	Third Doctor, Jo (Katy Manning)	August 2011
4	"The Old Rogue"	Nicholas Briggs, Ken Bentley	John Grindrod	Second Doctor, Fourth Doctor, Jamie, Romana II, K9 (Louise Jameson)	August 2011
5	"The Lions of Trafalgar"	Nicholas Briggs, Ken Bentley	Jason Arnopp	Fifth Doctor, Nyssa, Tegan (Peter Davison)	August 2011
6	"To Cut a Blade of Grass"	Nicholas Briggs, Ken Bentley	Cindy Garland	Sixth Doctor, Peri (Colin Baker)	August 2011
7	"The Shadow Trader"	Nicholas Briggs, Ken Bentley	Charles Williams	Seventh Doctor, Ace (Sophie Aldred)	August 2011
8	"Quantum Heresy"	Nicholas Briggs, Ken Bentley	Avril Naude	Eighth Doctor (India Fisher)	August 2011

==== Series 5 (2015) ====
No.	Title	Directed by	Written by	Featuring	Released
1	"Flywheel Revolution"	Lisa Bowerman	Dale Smith	First Doctor (Peter Purves)	January 2015
2	"Little Doctors"	Lisa Bowerman	Philip Lawrence	Second Doctor, Jamie, Zoe (Frazer Hines)	February 2015
3	"Time Tunnel"	Lisa Bowerman	Nigel Fairs	Third Doctor, Jo, the Brigadier, Sergeant Benton, Mike Yates (Katy Manning)	March 2015
4	"The Ghost Trap"	Lisa Bowerman	Nick Wallace	Fourth Doctor, Leela (Louise Jameson)	April 2015
5	"The King of the Dead"	Lisa Bowerman	Ian Atkins	Fifth Doctor, Nyssa, Tegan (Sarah Sutton)	May 2015
6	"The Shadows of Serenity"	Lisa Bowerman	Nigel Robinson	Sixth Doctor, Peri (Nicola Bryant)	June 2015
7	"Dark Convoy"	Lisa Bowerman	Mark B Oliver	Seventh Doctor, Ace (Sophie Aldred)	July 2015
8	"Foreshadowing"	Lisa Bowerman	Julian Richards	Eighth Doctor, Charley, Mike Yates (India Fisher)	August 2015
9	"Etheria"	Lisa Bowerman	Nick Wallace	First Doctor, Vicki, Steven (Peter Purves)	September 2015
10	"The Way of the Empty Hand"	Lisa Bowerman	Julian Richards	Second Doctor, Jamie, Zoe (Frazer Hines)	October 2015
11	"The Other Woman"	Lisa Bowerman	Philip Lawrence	Third Doctor, Jo, the Brigadier (Katy Manning)	November 2015
12	"Black Dog"	Lisa Bowerman	Dale Smith	Fourth Doctor, Leela (Louise Jameson)	December 2015

==== Series 6 (2016) ====
No.	Title	Directed by	Written by	Featuring	Released
1	"Gardens of the Dead"	Lisa Bowerman	Jenny T Colgan	Fifth Doctor, Nyssa, Tegan, Turlough (Mark Strickson)	January 2016
2	"Prime Winner"	Lisa Bowerman	Nigel Fairs	Sixth Doctor, Peri (Nicola Bryant)	February 2016
3	"Washington Burns"	Lisa Bowerman	Julian Richards	Seventh Doctor, Ace (Sophie Aldred)	March 2016
4	"The Curse of the Fugue"	Lisa Bowerman	Alice Cavender	Eighth Doctor, Lucie (Sheridan Smith)	April 2016
5	"This Sporting Life"	Lisa Bowerman	Una McCormack	First Doctor, Steven, Dodo (Peter Purves)	May 2016
6	"Lost and Found"	Lisa Bowerman	Penelope Faith	Second Doctor, Polly, Ben (Anneke Wills)	June 2016
7	"The Blame Game"	Lisa Bowerman	Ian Atkins	Third Doctor, Liz, the Monk (Rufus Hound)	July 2016
8	"Damascus"	Lisa Bowerman	Jonathan Barnes	Third Doctor, Jo (Tim Treloar)	August 2016
9	"A Full Life"	Lisa Bowerman	Joseph Lidster	Fourth Doctor, Romana II, K9, Adric (Matthew Waterhouse)	September 2016
10	"Rulebook"	Lisa Bowerman	Tony Jones	Fifth Doctor, Peri (Nicola Bryant)	October 2016
11	"The Man Who Wasn't There"	Lisa Bowerman	Ian Atkins	Eighth Doctor, Charley (India Fisher)	November 2016
12	"The Hesitation Deviation"	Lisa Bowerman	James Goss	Seventh Doctor, Benny (Lisa Bowerman)	December 2016

==== Series 7 (2017) ====
No.	Title	Directed by	Written by	Featuring	Released
1	"The World Beyond the Trees"	Lisa Bowerman	Jonathan Barnes	Eighth Doctor, Molly O'Sullivan, Liv Chenka (Nicola Walker)	January 2017
2	"Gardeners' Worlds"	Lisa Bowerman	George Mann	Third Doctor, Jo (Tim Treloar)	February 2017
3	"The Jago and Litefoot Revival Act One"	Lisa Bowerman	Jonathan Barnes	Tenth Doctor, Eleventh Doctor, Jago & Litefoot (Christopher Benjamin & Trevor Baxter)	March 2017
4	"The Jago and Litefoot Revival Act Two"	Lisa Bowerman	Jonathan Barnes	Tenth Doctor, Eleventh Doctor, Jago & Litefoot (Christopher Benjamin & Trevor Baxter)	April 2017
5	"Falling"	Lisa Bowerman	Jonathan Barnes	First Doctor, Polly, Ben (Anneke Wills)	May 2017
6	"How to Win Planets and Influence People"	Lisa Bowerman	James Goss	Fourth Doctor, Sarah Jane & Harry Sullivan (Rufus Hound)	June 2017
7	"Flashpoint"	Lisa Bowerman	Andrew Smith	Eighth Doctor, Lucie Miller (Sheridan Smith)	July 2017
8	"The British Invasion"	Lisa Bowerman	Ian Potter	Second Doctor, Jamie & Zoe (Wendy Padbury)	August 2017
9	"A Heart on Both Sides"	Lisa Bowerman	Rob Nisbet	Eighth Doctor, Nyssa (Sarah Sutton)	September 2017
10	"All Hands on Deck"	Lisa Bowerman	Eddie Robson	Eighth Doctor, Susan (Carole Ann Ford)	October 2017
11	"The Ingenious Gentleman Adric of Alzarius"	Lisa Bowerman	Julian Richards	Fifth Doctor, Adric, Nyssa, Tegan (Matthew Waterhouse)	November 2017
12	"O Tannenbaum"	Lisa Bowerman	Anthony Keetch	First Doctor, Steven (Peter Purves)	December 2017

==== Series 8 (2018) ====
No.	Title	Directed by	Written by	Featuring	Released
1	"The Authentic Experience"	Lisa Bowerman	Dan Starkey	Sixth Doctor, Peri (Nicola Bryant)	January 2018
2	"Mel-Evolent"	Helen Goldwyn	Simon A. Forward	Sixth Doctor, Mel (Bonnie Langford)	February 2018
3	"The Turn of the Screw"	Lisa Bowerman	Eddie Robson	Eighth Doctor, Charlie Sato (Yee Jee Tso)	March 2018
4	"Erasure"	Gary Russell	Gary Russell	Fourth Doctor, Adric, Narvin (Sean Carlsen)	April 2018
5	"Trap For Fools"	Lisa Bowerman	Stephen Fewell	Fifth Doctor, Turlough (Mark Strickson)	May 2018
6	"The Siege of Big Ben"	Lisa Bowerman	Joseph Lidster	Meta-Crisis Doctor, Jackie (Camille Coduri)	June 2018
7	"The Darkened Earth"	Lisa Bowerman	John Pritchard	Sixth Doctor, Constance (Miranda Raison)	July 2018
8	"Flight into Hull"	Lisa Bowerman	Joseph Lidster	Meta-Crisis Doctor, Jackie (Camille Coduri)	August 2018
9	"A Small Semblance Of Home"	Lisa Bowerman	Paul Phipps	First Doctor, Susan, Ian, Barbara (Carole Ann Ford)	September 2018
10	"I Am the Master"	Lisa Bowerman	Geoffrey Beevers	Fourth Doctor, The Master (Geoffrey Beevers)	October 2018
11	"The Mistpuddle Murders"	Lisa Bowerman	Simon A Forward	Fifth Doctor, Nyssa, Tegan (Sarah Sutton)	November 2018
12	"The Devil's Footprints"	Helen Goldwyn	Penelope Faith	Seventh Doctor, Mel (Bonnie Langford)	December 2018

==== Series 9 (2019) ====
No.	Title	Directed by	Written by	Featuring	Released
1	"The Revisionists"	Lisa Bowerman	Andy Frankham-Allen	Fourth Doctor, Leela, The Brigadier (Louise Jameson)	January 2019
2	"The Astrea Conspiracy"	Nicholas Briggs	Lizbeth Myles	Twelfth Doctor, Aphra Behn (Neve McIntosh)	February 2019
3	"Doctors and Dragons"	Lisa Bowerman	Alfie Shaw	Seventh Doctor, Reya (Sophie Aldred)	March 2019
4	"Year of the Drex Olympics"	Lisa Bowerman	Paul Ebbs	Second Doctor, Jamie, Victoria (Frazer Hines)	April 2019
5	"Under ODIN's Eye"	Helen Goldwyn	Alice Cavender	Sixth Doctor, Peri (Nicola Bryant)	May 2019
6	"The Same Face"	Nicholas Briggs	Julian Richards	Third Doctor, Jo (Katy Manning)	June 2019
7	"Battle Scars"	Alfie Shaw	Selim Ulug	Ninth Doctor (Nicholas Briggs)	July 2019
8	"#HarrySullivan"	Lisa Bowerman	Eddie Robson	Fourth Doctor, Harry, Sarah Jane (Louise Jameson)	August 2019
9	"Dead Media"	Nicholas Briggs	John Richards	Twelfth Doctor (Jacob Dudman)	September 2019
10	"The Second Oldest Question"	Lisa Bowerman	Carrie Thompson	Fifth Doctor, Nyssa (Sarah Sutton)	October 2019
11	"Hall of the Ten Thousand"	Lisa Bowerman	Jaine Fenn	Eighth Doctor, Charley (India Fisher)	November 2019
12	"Peace in Our Time"	Lisa Bowerman	Una McCormack	First Doctor, Steven (Peter Purves)	December 2019

==== Series 10 (2020) ====
No.	Title	Directed by	Written by	Featuring	Released
1	"The Infinite Today"	Nicholas Briggs	Sharon Bidwell	Eleventh Doctor, Jo (Katy Manning)	January 2020
2	"Deleted Scenes"	Lisa Bowerman	Angus Dunican	Second Doctor, Jamie (Frazer Hines)	February 2020
3	"Decline of the Ancient Mariner"	Nicholas Briggs	Rob Nisbet	Third Doctor, Sarah Jane (Mark Reynolds)	March 2020
4	"Dead Woman Walking"	Lisa Bowerman	Roland Moore	Seventh Doctor, Ace (Sophie Aldred)	April 2020
5	"Regeneration Impossible"	Nicholas Briggs	Alfie Shaw	Eleventh Doctor, Twelfth Doctor (Jacob Dudman)	May 2020
6	"Out of the Deep"	Lisa Bowerman	John Pritchard	First Doctor, Steven (Peter Purves)	June 2020
7	"Downward Spiral"	Lisa Bowerman	Alan Flanagan	Fifth Doctor, Nyssa (Sarah Sutton)	July 2020
8	"These Stolen Hours"	Lisa Bowerman	Grace Knight	Sixth Doctor, Charley (India Fisher)	August 2020
9	"Her Own Bootstraps"	Nicholas Briggs	Amy Veeres	Ninth Doctor (Jacob Dudman)	September 2020
10	"The Meaning of Red"	Helen Goldwyn	Rod Brown	Fifth Doctor, Peri (Nicola Byrant)	October 2020
11	"Blue Boxes"	Nicholas Briggs	Erin Horakova	Third Doctor, Liz (Mark Reynolds)	November 2020
12	"The Shattered Hour Glass"	Nicholas Briggs	Robert Napton	Tenth Doctor (Neve McIntosh)	December 2020

==== Volume 11 (2022) ====
In November 2020, it was announced that the Short Trips range would return to the audio anthology format. It consists of 6 episodes.

No.	Title	Directed by	Written by	Featuring	Released
1	"Rearguard"	Scott Handcock	Alfie Shaw	Eleventh Doctor, Sontarans (Dan Starkey & Jacob Dudman)	February 2022
2	"Messages from the Dead"	Lisa Bowerman	Rochana Patel	Fourth Doctor, Adric (Matthew Waterhouse)	February 2022
3	"The Threshold"	Scott Handcock	Felecia Barker	Third Doctor, The Master (Jon Culshaw)	February 2022
4	"Death Will Not Part Us"	Scott Handcock	Alfie Shaw	Eighth Doctor (Adèle Anderson)	February 2022
5	"Fear of Flying"	Lisa Bowerman	Paul F Verhoeven	Tenth Doctor (Ayesha Antoine)	February 2022
6	"Inside Story"	Lisa Bowerman	Ben Tedds	Seventh Doctor (Sophie Aldred)	February 2022

==== Volume 12 (2023) ====
No.	Title	Directed by	Written by	Featuring	Released
1	"Salvage"	Scott Handcock	Max Curtis	Eighth Doctor, Bliss (Adèle Anderson)	February 2023
2	"AWOL"	Scott Handcock	Angus Dunican	Third Doctor, The Brigadier (Jon Culshaw)	February 2023
3	"The Three Flames"	Scott Handcock	Fio Trethewey	Twelfth Doctor (Dan Starkey)	February 2023
4	"Identity Check"	Scott Handcock	Eugenie Pusenjak	Ninth Doctor, Rose Tyler (Jacob Dudman)	February 2023
5	"Table for Two, Dinner for One"	Lisa Bowerman	Jennah Dean	Tenth Doctor (Ayesha Antoine)	February 2023
6	"The Galois Group"	Scott Handcock	Felecia Barker	Eleventh Doctor, Valarie (Safiyya Ingar)	February 2023

==== Volume 13: Tales from the Vortex (2025) ====
No.	Title	Directed by	Written by	Featuring	Released
1	"Dark Watchers of California"	Lisa Bowerman	Riley Silverman	Twelfth Doctor, Bill	February 2025
2	"When I say run..."	Lisa Bowerman	Ben Tedds	Tenth Doctor, You	February 2025
3	"Rise of the Eukaryans"	Lisa Bowerman	Daniel Hardcastle	Eleventh Doctor	February 2025
4	"Ahead of Time"	Lisa Bowerman	Paul Booth	Eighth Doctor, Charley	February 2025
5	"Emerald Isle"	Lisa Bowerman	Christian Markham	Seventh Doctor, Ace	February 2025
6	"Dark is the Devil that Walks"	Lisa Bowerman	Mags L Halliday	Fifth Doctor, Tegan, Turlough	February 2025

==== Specials: A Feast of Steven (2025) ====
No.	Title	Directed by	Written by	Featuring	Released
1	"A Forest of All Seasons"	John Ainsworth	Jacqueline Rayner	First Doctor, Steven, Vicki (Peter Purves)	June 2025
2	"The Doctor's Gambit"	John Ainsworth	Jacqueline Rayner	First Doctor, Steven, Dodo (Peter Purves)	June 2025

==== Volume 14: Impeccable and Other Stories (2026) ====
No.	Title	Directed by	Written by	Featuring	Released
1	"Impeccable"	Jason Haigh-Ellery	Georgia Cook	The Master (Eric Roberts)	February 2026
2	"Hard Feelings"	Nicholas Briggs	Philip Lawrence	Fifth Doctor, Nyssa (Sarah Sutton, Nicholas Briggs)	February 2026
3	"Cut-Out"	Lisa Bowerman	Dominick Polion	Multiple Doctors (Duncan Wisbey)	February 2026
4	"Bring Me the Head of Dorium Maldovar"	Lisa Bowerman	Nick Slawicz	Twelfth Doctor, Dorium Maldovar (Peter Forbes)	February 2026
5	"The Tip of the Mind"	Lisa Bowerman	Peter Anghelides	Third Doctor, Zoe Herriot (Lisa Bowerman)	February 2026
6	"Is Anybody There?"	Lisa Bowerman	Benjamin Mackenzie	Ninth Doctor (Bronté Barbé)	February 2026

==== Series 15 (2027) ====
No.	Title	Directed by	Written by	Featuring	Released
1	"Who the Dickens...?"	Lisa Bowerman	Juliet E. McKenna	Third Doctor, Jo (Tim Treloar)	January 2027
2	"Piccadilly Circus"	Peter Anghelides	Joseph Lidster	Susan (Carole Ann Ford)	February 2027
3	"The Cat with Two Lives"	Peter Anghelides	Luke Hollands	Thirteenth Doctor, Yaz (Clare Corbett)	March 2027
4	TBA	TBD	TBD	TBA	April 2027
5	TBA	TBD	TBD	TBA	May 2027
6	TBA	TBD	TBD	TBA	June 2027
7	TBA	TBD	TBD	TBA	July 2027
8	TBA	TBD	TBD	TBA	August 2027
9	TBA	TBD	TBD	TBA	September 2027
10	TBA	TBD	TBD	TBA	October 2027
11	TBA	TBD	TBD	TBA	November 2027

=== The Stageplays (2008) ===
No.	Title	Directed by	Written by	Featuring	Released
1	"The Ultimate Adventure"	Jason Haigh-Ellery	Terrance Dicks	Sixth Doctor, Daleks, Cybermen	September 2008
2	"Seven Keys to Doomsday"	John Ainsworth	Terrance Dicks	Trevor Martin, Daleks	October 2008
3	"The Curse of the Daleks"	Nicholas Briggs	David Whitaker & Terry Nation	Daleks	November 2008

=== Unbound (2003–present) ===
==== Original series (2003–2008) ====
No.	Title	Directed by	Written by	Featuring	Released
1	"Auld Mortality"	Nicholas Briggs	Marc Platt	Alternative First Doctor (Geoffrey Bayldon), Susan Foreman	May 2003
2	"Sympathy for the Devil"	Gary Russell	Jonathan Clements	Alternative Third Doctor (David Warner), The Brigadier, The Master	June 2003
3	"Full Fathom Five"	Jason Haigh-Ellery	David Bishop	Alternative Doctor (David Collings), Ruth, Alternative New Doctor (Ian Brooker, uncredited)	July 2003
4	"He Jests at Scars..."	Gary Russell	Gary Russell	The Valeyard, Mel	August 2003
5	"Deadline"	Nicholas Briggs	Robert Shearman	Martin Bannister (Derek Jacobi), Philip, Barbara, Amy/Susan	September 2003
6	"Exile"	Nicholas Briggs	Nicholas Briggs	The Previous Doctor (Nicholas Briggs), Alternative Third Doctor (Arabella Weir)	September 2003
7	"A Storm of Angels"	John Ainsworth	Marc Platt	Alternative First Doctor (Geoffrey Bayldon), Susan Foreman	January 2005
8	"Masters of War"	Jason Haigh-Ellery	Eddie Robson	Alternative Third Doctor (David Warner), The Brigadier, Davros, Daleks, Thals	December 2008

==== Doctor of War (2022) ====
No.	Title	Directed by	Written by	Featuring	Released
Genesis
1	"Dust Devil"	Barnaby Kay	John Dorney	The Doctor of War (Colin Baker), Fourth Doctor, Sarah Jane Smith, Harry Sullivan, Peri Brown, Narvin	April 2022
2	"Aftershocks"	Barnaby Kay	Lou Morgan	The Doctor of War, The Master, Narvin	April 2022
3	"The Difference Office"	Barnaby Kay	James Kettle	The Doctor of War, Romana, Daleks, Kraals	April 2022
Destiny
1	"Who Am I?"	Barnaby Kay	Nigel Fairs	The Doctor of War, The Master	September 2022
2	"Time Killers"	Barnaby Kay	Lizzie Hopley	The Doctor of War, The Master	September 2022
3	"The Key to Key to Time"	Barnaby Kay	Tim Foley	The Doctor of War, The White Guardian	September 2022

==== The First Doctor Unbound (2025–present) ====
No.	Title	Directed by	Written by	Featuring	Released
1	"Knights of the Round TARDIS"	David O’Mahony	LR Hay	First Doctor, Susan, Ian, Barbara	September 2025
2	"Return to Marinus"	David O’Mahony	Jonathan Morris	First Doctor, Susan, Ian, Barbara, Daleks	January 2026
3	TBA	David O’Mahony	N/A	First Doctor, Susan, Ian, Barbara	May 2027

== Special releases ==
=== Excelis (2002) ===
No.	Title	Directed by	Written by	Featuring	Released
1	"Excelis Dawns"	Gary Russell	Paul Magrs	Fifth Doctor, Iris Wildthyme	February 2002
2	"Excelis Rising"	Edward Salt	David A. McIntee	Sixth Doctor	April 2002
3	"Excelis Decays"	Gary Russell	Craig Hinton	Seventh Doctor	June 2002

A fourth audio play in the Excelis saga, The Plague Herds of Excelis, was released in July 2002 to conclude the saga. This audio play features former companion of the Doctor Bernice Summerfield, alongside the returning Iris Wildthyme from Excelis Dawns.

=== Shada (2003) ===
No.	Title	Directed by	Written by	Featuring	Released
–	"Shada"	Nicholas Pegg	Douglas Adams	Eighth Doctor, Romana II, K9	December 2003

=== The Veiled Leopard (2006) ===
No.	Title	Directed by	Written by	Featuring	Released
–	"The Veiled Leopard"	Gary Russell	Iain McLaughlin and Claire Bartlett	Peri, Erimem, Ace, Hex	March 2006

=== The Four Doctors (2010) ===
No.	Title	Directed by	Written by	Featuring	Released
–	"The Four Doctors"	Nicholas Briggs and Ken Bentley	Peter Anghelides	Fifth Doctor, Sixth Doctor, Seventh Doctor, Eighth Doctor, Daleks	December 2010

=== The Five Companions (2011) ===
No.	Title	Directed by	Written by	Featuring	Released
–	"The Five Companions"	Ken Bentley	Eddie Robson	Fifth Doctor, Ian, Polly, Steven, Sara, Nyssa, Daleks, Sontarans	December 2011

=== The Light at the End (2013) ===
No.	Title	Directed by	Written by	Featuring	Released
–	"The Light at the End"	Nicholas Briggs	Nicholas Briggs	First Doctor, Second Doctor, Third Doctor, Fourth Doctor, Fifth Doctor, Sixth Doctor, Seventh Doctor, Eighth Doctor, Leela, Nyssa, Peri, Ace, Charley, the Master, Ian, Susan, Vicki, Steven, Sara, Polly, Jamie, Zoe, Jo, Tegan, Turlough	October 2013

=== Classic Doctors, New Monsters (2016–present) ===
==== Volume 1 (2016) ====
No.	Title	Directed by	Written by	Featuring	Released
1	"Fallen Angels"	Barnaby Edwards	Phil Mulryne	Fifth Doctor, Weeping Angels	July 2016
The Fifth Doctor, allied with a pair of teachers who were originally on their honeymoon in 2016, must save Michaelangelo from the Order of the Angels in the fifteenth century.
2	"Judoon in Chains"	Barnaby Edwards	Simon Barnard and Paul Morris	Sixth Doctor, Judoon	July 2016
The Sixth Doctor defends Captain Kybo of the Judoon on charges of desertion in a Victorian-era courthouse.
3	"Harvest of the Sycorax"	Barnaby Edwards	James Goss	Seventh Doctor, Sycorax	July 2016
The Seventh Doctor and his new allies fight to prevent the Sycorax from taking control of a space station that has access to blood samples from the entire human race.
4	"The Sontaran Ordeal"	Barnaby Edwards	Andrew Smith	Eighth Doctor, Sontarans	July 2016
When a planet's history is corrupted by the Time War, the Eighth Doctor must stop the Sontarans from mounting an invasion of a decimated world.

==== Volume 2 (2017) ====
No.	Title	Directed by	Written by	Featuring	Released
1	"Night of the Vashta Nerada"	Barnaby Edwards	John Dorney	Fourth Doctor, Vashta Nerada	July 2017
Seeking a holiday after the departure of his last companion, the Fourth Doctor visits the planet-sized theme park Funworld, but discovers that its first visitors are under threat from the local Vashta Nerada.
2	"Empire of the Racnoss"	Barnaby Edwards	Scott Handcock	Fifth Doctor, Racnoss	July 2017
The Fifth Doctor is drawn into the distant past and becomes caught up in the war against the Racnoss.
3	"The Carrionite Curse"	Barnaby Edwards	Simon Guerrier	Sixth Doctor, Carrionites	July 2017
A visit to a seemingly peaceful village in the 1980s pits the Sixth Doctor against the Carrionites.
4	"Day of the Vashta Nerada"	Barnaby Edwards	Matt Fitton	Eighth Doctor, Vashta Nerada	July 2017
A Time Lord experiment to weaponise the Vashta Nerada goes horribly wrong, and the Eighth Doctor races against time to save whatever survivors he can find.

==== Volume 3: The Stuff of Nightmares (2022) ====
No.	Title	Directed by	Written by	Featuring	Released
1	"The House That Hoxx Built"	Barnaby Edwards	Tim Foley	Third Doctor, Sarah Jane Smith, Hoxx of Balhoon	July 2022
2	"The Tivolian Who Knew Too Much"	Barnaby Edwards	Robert Valentine	Fourth Doctor, Leela, Tivolian	July 2022
3	"Together in Eclectic Dreams"	Barnaby Edwards	Roy Gill	Sixth Doctor, Eighth Doctor, Mari, Kantrofarri	July 2022
4	"If I Should Die Before I Wake"	Barnaby Edwards	John Dorney, Jacqueline Rayner	Eighth Doctor, Charley Pollard, Kantrofarri	July 2022

==== Volume 4: Broken Memories (2024) ====
No.	Title	Directed by	Written by	Featuring	Released
1	"Invasion of the Body Stealers"	Barnaby Edwards	Jonathan Morris	Fourth Doctor, Sarah Jane Smith, Harmony Shoal	March 2024
2	"The Queen of Clocks"	Barnaby Edwards	Jacqueline Rayner	Sixth Doctor, Mel Bush, Clockwork Droids	March 2024
3	"The Silent Priest"	Barnaby Edwards	David K Barnes	Eighth Doctor, The Silence	March 2024
4	"The Silent City"	Barnaby Edwards	David K Barnes	Seventh Doctor, The Silence	March 2024

==== Volume 5: Faithful Friends (2025) ====
No.	Title	Directed by	Written by	Featuring	Released
1	"The Krillitane Feint"	Barnaby Edwards	John Dorney	Second Doctor, Jamie McCrimmon, Zoe Heriot, Krillitanes	January 2025
2	"The Dying Breed"	Barnaby Edwards	Tim Foley	Fourth Doctor, Leela, K-9, Lupari	January 2025
3	"The Krillitane Relic"	Barnaby Edwards	John Dorney	Seventh Doctor, Ray, Zoe Heriot, Krillitanes	January 2025
4	"Five Hundred Ways to Leave Your Lover"	Barnaby Edwards	Tim Foley	Eighth Doctor, Monks	January 2025

=== The Comic Strip Adaptations (2019) ===
No.	Title	Directed by	Written by	Featuring	Released
1	"Doctor Who and the Iron Legion"	Nicholas Briggs	Pat Mills, John Wagner and Dave Gibbons, adapted by Alan Barnes	Fourth Doctor	March 2019
2	"Doctor Who and the Star Beast"	Nicholas Briggs	Pat Mills, John Wagner and Dave Gibbons, adapted by Alan Barnes	Fourth Doctor, Sharon, Beep the Meep	March 2019

=== The Legacy of Time (2019) ===
No.	Title	Directed by	Written by	Featuring	Released
1	"Lies in Ruins"	Ken Bentley	James Goss	Eighth Doctor, Bernice Summerfield, River Song	July 2019
2	"The Split Infinitive"	Ken Bentley	John Dorney	Seventh Doctor, Ace, Counter Measures	July 2019
3	"The Sacrifice of Jo Grant"	Ken Bentley	Guy Adams	Third Doctor, Jo Grant, Kate Stewart, Osgood, UNIT	July 2019
4	"Relative Time"	Ken Bentley	Matt Fitton	Fifth Doctor, Jenny	July 2019
5	"The Avenues of Possibility"	Ken Bentley	Jonathan Morris	Sixth Doctor, Charley Pollard, DI Patricia Menzies	July 2019
6	"Collision Course"	Ken Bentley	Guy Adams	Fourth Doctor, Leela, Romana	July 2019

=== Peladon (2022) ===
No.	Title	Directed by	Written by	Featuring	Released
1	"The Ordeal of Peladon"	Barnaby Kay	Jonathan Barnes & Robert Valentine	King Peladon	January 2022
2	"The Poison of Peladon"	Barnaby Kay	Lizzie Hopley	River Song, King Peladon	January 2022
3	"The Death of Peladon"	Barnaby Kay	Mark Wright	Sixth Doctor, Mel, King Peladon	January 2022
4	"The Truth of Peladon"	Barnaby Kay	Tim Foley	Eighth Doctor, King Peladon	January 2022

=== Sontarans vs Rutans (2024) ===
No.	Title	Directed by	Written by	Featuring	Released
1	"The Battle of Giant's Causeway"	Ken Bentley	Lizzie Hopley	Eighth Doctor, Charley, C'rizz, Sontarans, Rutans	January 2024
2	"The Children of the Future"	Ken Bentley	Tim Foley	Third Doctor, Sarah Jane, The Brigadier, Sontarans, Rutans	February 2024
3	"Born to Die"	Ken Bentley	Tiegan Byrne	Sixth Doctor, Charley, Sontarans, Rutans	March 2024
4	"In Name Only"	Ken Bentley	John Dorney	War Doctor, Sontarans, Rutans	April 2024

=== The Sirens of Time Redux (2024) ===
No.	Title	Directed by	Written by	Featuring	Released
–	"The Sirens of Time Redux"	Nicholas Briggs	Nicholas Briggs	Fifth Doctor, Sixth Doctor, Seventh Doctor, Time Lords	November 2024

=== Halloween (2025–present) ===
==== Sea Smoke and Other Stories (2025) ====
No.	Title	Directed by	Written by	Featuring	Released
1	"Sea Smoke"	Ken Bentley	Jonathan Sims	First Doctor, Dodo Chaplet	October 2025
2	"Party Favours"	Helen Goldwyn	Georgia Cook	Kate Stewart, Osgood	October 2025
3	"Bramble King"	Steven Kavuma	Noga Flaishon	Eighth Doctor, Audacity Montague	October 2025
4	"Merlin's Trap"	Samuel Clemens	Hannah Kennedy	Twelfth Doctor	October 2025

==== Doctor, Doctor, Doctor and Other Stories (2026) ====
No.	Title	Directed by	Written by	Featuring	Released
1	"Doctor, Doctor, Doctor"	Samuel Clemens, Barnaby Edwards, Ken Bentley	Stewart Pringle and Lauren Mooney	Seventh Doctor	October 2026
2	"The Song of the Reed Man"	Samuel Clemens, Barnaby Edwards, Ken Bentley	Katherine White	Third Doctor, Jo Jones	October 2026
3	"Office Space"	Samuel Clemens, Barnaby Edwards, Ken Bentley	Georgia Cook and Fio Trethewey	UNIT	October 2026
4	"Overworked"	Samuel Clemens, Barnaby Edwards, Ken Bentley	Hannah Kennedy	Fifth Doctor, Nyssa	October 2026

=== Christmas (2025–present) ===
==== It's A Wonderful War and Other Stories (2025) ====
No.	Title	Directed by	Written by	Featuring	Released
1	"Unholy Night"	Jonathan S Powell	Noga Flaishon	Missy	December 2025
2	"Legacy of Blood"	Jonathan S Powell	Julian Richards	Sixth Doctor, Leela	December 2025
3	"Presents of Mind"	Jonathan S Powell	Mark Wright	Sarah Jane Smith, Harry Sullivan, K9	December 2025
4	"It's a Wonderful War"	Jonathan S Powell	Jonathan S Powell	Eighth Doctor, Daleks	December 2025

==== Out of the Dark and Other Stories (2026) ====
No.	Title	Directed by	Written by	Featuring	Released
1	"Merry Christmas, Mr Chimbly"	Jonathan S Powell	John Dorney	Fifth Doctor, Tegan Jovanka, Nyssa	December 2026
2	"From the Realms of Glory"	Jonathan S Powell	Hannah Kennedy	River Song	December 2026
3	"Out of the Dark"	Jonathan S Powell	Jonathan S Powell	Seventh Doctor, Ace	December 2026
4	"And Tiny Tim, Who Did Not Die"	Jonathan S Powell	James Goss	Eleventh Doctor, Bernice Summerfield	December 2026

=== Rutans vs Sontarans (2026) ===
No.	Title	Directed by	Written by	Featuring	Released
1	"Betrayal at the House of Sontar"	Ken Bentley	John Dorney	Fugitive Doctor, Sontarans	April 2026
2	"Rendition"	Ken Bentley	Tim Foley	Second Doctor, Eighth Doctor, Jamie McCrimmon, Zoe Heriot, Rutans, Sontarans	May 2026
3	"Grave Moon"	Ken Bentley	Lizzie Hopley	Sixth Doctor, Eighth Doctor, Peri Brown, Rutans, Sontarans	June 2026
4	"Peace at Last"	Ken Bentley	Tim Foley	Eighth Doctor, Charley Pollard, C'rizz	July 2026

== See also ==
- Big Finish Productions
- Doctor Who spin-offs
