= Doctor Who: The Companion Chronicles =

Sci-fi audio series, from 2007

The Companion Chronicles is a sci-fi audio series produced by Big Finish, detailing adventures usually featuring the Doctor, as told by various former companions of his, with only one further voice actor taking part in the narration. It began in 2007 as a mini-series of four stories about adventures of the first four Doctors (none of whom appeared in regular Big Finish audio plays, as William Hartnell, Patrick Troughton and Jon Pertwee died before they began and Tom Baker had declined to participate at that time), but its popularity ensured that it returned for a second mini-series, and then in July 2008 releases became monthly. The monthly series of Companion Chronicles ended in June 2014 but the range has continued with box set releases, focusing on adventures concerning the First and Second Doctors as narrated by their surviving companions.

== Episodes ==
The character in brackets in the "Featuring" column is who the story is told by.

=== Series 1 (2007) ===
No.	Title	Directed by	Written by	Featuring	Released
1	"Frostfire"	Mark J Thompson	Marc Platt	First Doctor, Steven Taylor (Vicki)	February 2007
2	"Fear of the Daleks"	Mark J Thompson	Patrick Chapman	Second Doctor, Jamie McCrimmon, Daleks (Zoe Heriot)	February 2007
3	"The Blue Tooth"	Mark J Thompson	Nigel Fairs	Third Doctor, The Brigadier, Benton, Mike Yates, Cybermen (Liz Shaw)	February 2007
4	"The Beautiful People"	Mark J Thompson	Jonathan Morris	Fourth Doctor, K9 (Romana II)	February 2007

=== Series 2 (2007–08) ===
No.	Title	Directed by	Written by	Featuring	Released
1	"Mother Russia"	Nigel Fairs	Marc Platt	First Doctor, Dodo Chaplet (Steven Taylor)	October 2007
2	"Helicon Prime"	Nigel Fairs	Jake Elliot	Second Doctor (Jamie McCrimmon)	November 2007
3	"Old Soldiers"	Nigel Fairs	James Swallow	Third Doctor (The Brigadier)	December 2007
4	"The Catalyst"	Nigel Fairs	Nigel Fairs	Fourth Doctor (Leela)	January 2008

=== Series 3 (2008–09) ===
No.	Title	Directed by	Written by	Featuring	Released
1	"Here There Be Monsters"	Lisa Bowerman	Andy Lane	First Doctor, Ian Chesterton, Barbara Wright (Susan Foreman)	July 2008
2	"The Great Space Elevator"	Nigel Fairs	Jonathan Morris	Second Doctor, Jamie McCrimmon (Victoria Waterfield)	August 2008
3	"The Doll of Death"	Lisa Bowerman	Marc Platt	Third Doctor, The Brigadier, Benton, Mike Yates (Jo Grant)	September 2008
4	"Empathy Games"	Nigel Fairs	Nigel Fairs	Fourth Doctor (Leela)	October 2008
5	"Home Truths"	Lisa Bowerman	Simon Guerrier	First Doctor, Steven Taylor (Sara Kingdom)	November 2008
6	"The Darkening Eye"	Ken Bentley	Stewart Sheargold	Fifth Doctor, Tegan, Adric, Dar Traders (Nyssa)	December 2008
7	"The Transit of Venus"	Nigel Fairs	Jacqueline Rayner	First Doctor, Susan Foreman, Barbara Wright (Ian Chesterton)	January 2009
8	"The Prisoner's Dilemma"	Lisa Bowerman	Simon Guerrier	Seventh Doctor (Ace)	February 2009
9	"Resistance"	Lisa Bowerman	Steve Lyons	Second Doctor, Ben, Jamie McCrimmon (Polly)	March 2009
10	"The Magician's Oath"	Nigel Fairs	Scott Handcock	Third Doctor, Jo Grant, The Brigadier, Benton (Mike Yates)	April 2009
11	"The Mahogany Murderers"	Lisa Bowerman	Andy Lane	Dr. Tulp (Jago, Litefoot)	May 2009
12	"Stealers from Saiph"	Lisa Bowerman	Nigel Robinson	Fourth Doctor (Romana I)	June 2009

=== Series 4 (2009–10) ===
No.	Title	Directed by	Written by	Featuring	Released
1	"The Drowned World"	Lisa Bowerman	Simon Guerrier	First Doctor, Steven Taylor (Sara Kingdom)	July 2009
2	"The Glorious Revolution"	Nigel Fairs	Jonathan Morris	Second Doctor, Zoe Heriot (Jamie McCrimmon)	August 2009
3	"The Prisoner of Peladon"	Nicola Bryant	Mark Wright, Cavan Scott	Third Doctor, Ice Warriors, Alpha Centauri (King Peladon)	September 2009
4	"The Pyralis Effect"	Lisa Bowerman	George Mann	Fourth Doctor (Romana II)	October 2009
5	"Ringpullworld"	Neil Roberts	Paul Magrs	Fifth Doctor, Tegan, Huxley (Turlough)	November 2009
6	"Bernice Summerfield and the Criminal Code"	John Ainsworth	Eddie Robson	Seventh Doctor (Benny)	January 2010
7	"The Suffering"	Lisa Bowerman	Jacqueline Rayner	First Doctor (Steven Taylor, Vicki)	February 2010
8	"The Emperor of Eternity"	Lisa Bowerman	Nigel Robinson	Second Doctor (Jamie McCrimmon, Victoria Waterfield)	March 2010
9	"Shadow of the Past"	Lisa Bowerman	Simon Guerrier	Third Doctor, The Brigadier (Liz Shaw)	April 2010
10	"The Time Vampire"	Nigel Fairs	Nigel Fairs	Fourth Doctor (Leela, K9)	May 2010
11	"Night's Black Agents"	Lisa Bowerman	Marty Ross	Sixth Doctor (Jamie McCrimmon)	May 2010
12	"Solitaire"	Nicholas Briggs	John Dorney	Eighth Doctor, Celestial Toymaker (Charley Pollard)	June 2010

=== Series 5 (2010–11) ===
No.	Title	Directed by	Written by	Featuring	Released
1	"The Guardian of the Solar System"	Lisa Bowerman	Simon Guerrier	First Doctor, Steven Taylor, Mavic Chen (Sara Kingdom)	July 2010
2	"Echoes of Grey"	Lisa Bowerman	John Dorney	Second Doctor, Jamie McCrimmon (Zoe Heriot)	August 2010
3	"Find and Replace"	Lisa Bowerman	Paul Magrs	Third Doctor, Benton (Jo Grant, Iris Wildthyme)	September 2010
4	"The Invasion of E-Space"	Lisa Bowerman	Andrew Smith	Fourth Doctor, Adric (Romana II)	October 2010
5	"A Town Called Fortune"	Lisa Bowerman	Paul Sutton	Sixth Doctor (Evelyn Smythe)	November 2010
6	"Quinnis"	Lisa Bowerman	Marc Platt	First Doctor (Susan Foreman)	December 2010
7	"Peri and the Piscon Paradox"	John Ainsworth	Nev Fountain	Fifth Doctor (Sixth Doctor, Peri Brown)	January 2011
8	"The Perpetual Bond"	Lisa Bowerman	Simon Guerrier	First Doctor (Steven Taylor, Oliver Harper)	February 2011
9	"The Forbidden Time"	Lisa Bowerman	David Lock	Second Doctor, Ben (Polly, Jamie McCrimmon)	March 2011
10	"The Sentinels of the New Dawn"	Lisa Bowerman	Paul Finch	Third Doctor (Liz Shaw)	April 2011
11	"Ferril's Folly"	Lisa Bowerman	Peter Anghelides	Fourth Doctor (Romana I)	May 2011
12	"The Cold Equations"	Lisa Bowerman	Simon Guerrier	First Doctor (Steven Taylor, Oliver Harper)	June 2011

=== Specials (2011) ===
No.	Title	Directed by	Written by	Featuring	Released
1	"The Three Companions"	Lisa Bowerman	Marc Platt	Second Doctor, Third Doctor, Ben, Jamie McCrimmon (Polly, The Brigadier, Brewster)	August 2011
2	"The Mists of Time"	Lisa Bowerman	Jonathan Morris	Third Doctor (Jo Grant)	August 2011
3	"Freakshow"	Lisa Bowerman	Mark Morris	Fifth Doctor, Tegan (Turlough)	August 2011

=== Series 6 (2011–12) ===
No.	Title	Directed by	Written by	Featuring	Released
1	"Tales from the Vault"	Lisa Bowerman	Jonathan Morris	First Doctor, Second Doctor, Third Doctor, Fourth Doctor, Jamie McCrimmon, Dodo Chaplet (Jo Grant, Romana I, Zoe Heriot, Steven Taylor)	July 2011
2	"The Rocket Men"	Lisa Bowerman	John Dorney	First Doctor, Barbara Wright, Vicki (Ian Chesterton)	August 2011
3	"The Memory Cheats"	Lisa Bowerman	Simon Guerrier	Second Doctor, Jamie McCrimmon (Zoe Heriot)	September 2011
4	"The Many Deaths of Jo Grant"	Lisa Bowerman	Mark Wright, Cavan Scott	Third Doctor, The Brigadier (Jo Grant)	October 2011
5	"The First Wave"	Lisa Bowerman	Simon Guerrier	First Doctor, Vardans (Steven Taylor, Oliver Harper)	November 2011
6	"Beyond the Ultimate Adventure"	Jason Haigh-Ellery	Terrance Dicks	Sixth Doctor, Rutans, Raston Warrior (Crystal, Jason, Sixth Doctor)	December 2011
7	"The Anachronauts"	Ken Bentley	Simon Guerrier	First Doctor (Steven Taylor, Sara Kingdom)	January 2012
8	"The Selachian Gambit"	Lisa Bowerman	Steve Lyons	Second Doctor, Ben (Polly, Jamie McCrimmon)	February 2012
9	"Binary"	Lisa Bowerman	Eddie Robson	Third Doctor (Liz Shaw)	March 2012
10	"The Wanderer"	Lisa Bowerman	Richard Dinnick	First Doctor, Susan Foreman, Barbara Wright (Ian Chesterton)	April 2012
11	"The Jigsaw War"	Lisa Bowerman	Eddie Robson	Second Doctor (Jamie McCrimmon)	May 2012
12	"The Rings of Ikiria"	Ken Bentley	Richard Dinnick	Third Doctor, The Brigadier, Benton (Mike Yates)	June 2012

=== Special (2012) ===
No.	Title	Directed by	Written by	Featuring	Released
1	"The Revenants"	Lisa Bowerman	Ian Potter	First Doctor, Barbara (Ian)	May 2012

=== Series 7 (2012–13) ===
No.	Title	Directed by	Written by	Featuring	Released
1	"The Time Museum"	Lisa Bowerman	James Goss	First Doctor, Barbara (Ian)	July 2012
2	"The Uncertainty Principle"	Lisa Bowerman	Simon Guerrier	Second Doctor, Jamie McCrimmon (Zoe Heriot)	August 2012
3	"Project: Nirvana"	Ken Bentley	Mark Wright, Cavan Scott	(Seventh Doctor, Lysandra Aristedes, Sally)	September 2012
4	"The Last Post"	Lisa Bowerman	James Goss	Third Doctor, The Brigadier (Liz Shaw)	October 2012
5	"Return of the Rocket Men"	Lisa Bowerman	Matt Fitton	First Doctor, Dodo (Steven)	November 2012
6	"The Child"	Nigel Fairs	Nigel Fairs	Fourth Doctor (Leela)	December 2012
7	"The Flames of Cadiz"	Lisa Bowerman	Marc Platt	First Doctor, Barbara (Ian, Susan)	January 2013
8	"House of Cards"	Lisa Bowerman	Steve Lyons	Second Doctor, Ben (Jamie, Polly)	February 2013
9	"The Scorchies"	Ken Bentley	James Goss	Third Doctor (Jo)	March 2013
10	"The Library of Alexandria"	Lisa Bowerman	Simon Guerrier	First Doctor, Barbara, Susan (Ian)	April 2013
11	"The Apocalypse Mirror"	Lisa Bowerman	Eddie Robson	Second Doctor (Jamie, Zoe)	May 2013
12	"Council of War"	Lisa Bowerman	Simon Barnard and Paul Morris	Third Doctor, The Brigadier (John Benton)	June 2013

=== Series 8 (2013–14) ===
No.	Title	Directed by	Written by	Featuring	Released
1	"Mastermind"	Ken Bentley	Jonathan Morris	– (The Master)	July 2013
2	"The Alchemists"	Lisa Bowerman	Ian Potter	First Doctor (Susan)	August 2013
3	"Upstairs"	Lisa Bowerman	Mat Coward	First Doctor (Vicki, Steven)	September 2013
4	"Ghost in the Machine"	Louise Jameson	Jonathan Morris	Third Doctor (Jo Grant)	October 2013
5	"The Beginning"	Lisa Bowerman	Marc Platt	First Doctor, Quadrigger Stoyn (Susan Foreman)	November 2013
6	"The Dying Light"	Lisa Bowerman	Nick Wallace	Second Doctor, Quadrigger Stoyn (Jamie McCrimmon, Zoe Heriot)	December 2013
7	"Luna Romana"	Lisa Bowerman	Matt Fitton	Fourth Doctor, Romana I, Quadrigger Stoyn (Romana II, Romana III)	January 2014
8	"The Sleeping City"	Lisa Bowerman	Ian Potter	First Doctor, Barbara, Vicki (Ian Chesterton)	February 2014
9	"Starborn"	Lisa Bowerman	Jacqueline Rayner	First Doctor, Barbara, Ian (Vicki)	March 2014
10	"The War to End All Wars"	Lisa Bowerman	Simon Guerrier	First Doctor, Dodo Chaplet (Steven Taylor)	April 2014
11	"The Elixir of Doom"	Lisa Bowerman	Paul Magrs	Third Doctor, The Eighth Doctor (Jo Grant, Iris Wildthyme)	May 2014
12	"Second Chances"	Lisa Bowerman	John Dorney	Second Doctor, Jamie McCrimmon (Zoe Heriot)	June 2014

=== Series 9: The First Doctor Volume 1 (2015) ===
No.	Title	Directed by	Written by	Featuring	Released
1	"The Sleeping Blood"	Lisa Bowerman	Martin Day	First Doctor (Susan Foreman)	June 2015
2	"The Unwinding World"	Lisa Bowerman	Ian Potter	First Doctor, Ian, Barbara (Vicki)	June 2015
3	"The Founding Fathers"	Lisa Bowerman	Simon Guerrier	First Doctor, Vicki (Steven Taylor)	June 2015
4	"The Locked Room"	Lisa Bowerman	Simon Guerrier	First Doctor, Vicki (Steven Taylor)	June 2015

=== Series 10: The Second Doctor Volume 1 (2016) ===
No.	Title	Directed by	Written by	Featuring	Released
1	"The Mouthless Dead"	Lisa Bowerman	John Pritchard	Second Doctor (Ben, Polly, Jamie)	June 2016
2	"The Story of Extinction"	Lisa Bowerman	Ian Atkins	Second Doctor (Jamie, Victoria)	June 2016
3	"The Integral"	Lisa Bowerman	David Bartlett	Second Doctor (Jamie, Zoe)	June 2016
4	"The Edge"	Lisa Bowerman	Rob Nisbet	Second Doctor, Zoe (Jamie)	June 2016

=== Series 11: The First Doctor Volume 2 (2017) ===
No.	Title	Directed by	Written by	Featuring	Released
1	"Fields of Terror"	Lisa Bowerman	John Pritchard	First Doctor, Steven (Vicki)	June 2017
2	"Across the Darkened City"	Lisa Bowerman	David Bartlett	First Doctor, Vicki, Daleks (Steven)	June 2017
3	"Bonfires of the Vanities"	Lisa Bowerman	Una McCormack	First Doctor (Polly, Ben)	June 2017
4	"The Plague of Dreams"	Lisa Bowerman	Guy Adams	First Doctor (Polly, Ben)	June 2017

=== Series 12: The Second Doctor Volume 2 (2018) ===
No.	Title	Directed by	Written by	Featuring	Released
1	"The Curator's Egg"	Lisa Bowerman	Julian Richards	Second Doctor, (Polly, Ben)	June 2018
2	"Dumb Waiter"	Lisa Bowerman	Rob Nisbet	Second Doctor, Victoria (Jamie, Leela)	June 2018
3	"The Iron Maid"	Lisa Bowerman	John Pritchard	Second Doctor (Jamie, Zoe)	June 2018
4	"The Tactics of Defeat"	Helen Goldwyn	Tony Jones	Second Doctor (Jamie, Zoe)	June 2018

=== Series 13: The First Doctor Volume 3 (2019) ===
No.	Title	Directed by	Written by	Featuring	Released
1	"E is for..."	Lisa Bowerman	Julian Richards	First Doctor, Ian, Barbara (Susan)	September 2019
2	"Daybreak"	Lisa Bowerman	John Prichard	First Doctor (Vicki)	September 2019
3	"The Vardan Invasion of Mirth"	Lisa Bowerman	Paul Morris and Ian Atkins	First Doctor (Steven)	September 2019
4	"The Crumbling Magician"	Lisa Bowerman	Guy Adams	First Doctor (Polly)	September 2019

=== Series 14: The Second Doctor Volume 3 (2022) ===
No.	Title	Directed by	Written by	Featuring	Released
1	"The Death of the Daleks"	Lisa Bowerman	George Mann	Second Doctor (Jamie, Zoe)	April 2022
2	"The Phantom Piper"	Lisa Bowerman	Martin Day	Second Doctor (Jamie, Zoe)	April 2022
3	"The Prints of Denmark"	Nigel Fairs	Paul Morris	Second Doctor (Jamie, Zoe)	April 2022
4	"The Deepest Tragedian"	Nigel Fairs	Penelope Faith	Second Doctor (Jamie, Zoe)	April 2022

=== Series 15: Families (2025) ===
No.	Title	Directed by	Written by	Featuring	Released
1	"The Temple of Light"	Lisa Bowerman	Jonathan Morris	First Doctor, Ian, Barbara (Vicki)	April 2025
2	"Stardust and Ashes"	Lisa Bowerman	Ian Potter	First Doctor (Susan)	April 2025
3	"The White Ship"	Lisa Bowerman	Paul Morris	First Doctor (Steven)	April 2025
4	"The Y Factor"	Lisa Bowerman	Christopher Cooper	First Doctor (Dodo)	April 2025

=== Specials: The Legacy of Time (2026) ===
No.	Title	Directed by	Written by	Featuring	Released
1	"The Kraken of Hagwell"	Nicholas Briggs	Barbara Hambly	First Doctor, the Brigadier, the Master, Tenth Doctor	February 2026
2	"The Heartless Sea"	Nicholas Briggs	Simon Guerrier	Second Doctor, Harry Sullivan, Naomi Cross, First Doctor, Tenth Doctor	February 2026

== Awards and nominations ==
Name of the award ceremony, year presented, category, nominee(s) of the award, and the result of the nomination
Award ceremony	Year	Category	Work(s)	Result	Ref.
Scribe Awards	2012	Best Audio	The Many Deaths of Jo Grant	Nominated	
Scribe Awards	2013	Best Audio	Project: Nirvana	Nominated	
Scribe Awards	2017	Best Audio	The Mouthless Dead	Nominated	
Scribe Awards	2018	Best Audio	Across the Darkened City	Nominated	
Scribe Awards	2020	Best Audio	Daybreak	Nominated	
