= Just War (novel) =

1996 novel by Lance Parkin

- Author: Lance Parkin
- Cover artist: Nick Spender
- Series: Doctor Who book: Virgin New Adventures
- Release number: 46
- Subject: Featuring: Seventh Doctor; Benny, Chris, Roz
- Publisher: Virgin Books
- Publication date: January 1996
- Pages: 272
- ISBN: 0-426-20463-8
- Preceded by: Shakedown
- Followed by: Warchild

Just War is a novel by Lance Parkin from the Virgin New Adventures. The New Adventures were based on the long-running British science fiction television series Doctor Who. The novel featured the characters of the Seventh Doctor, Bernice Summerfield (known as Benny), Chris Cwej and Roz Forrester.

The story is set in Nazi Germany-occupied Guernsey, an example of invasion literature.

== Plot ==
The Doctor and his companions land in German-occupied Guernsey in 1941, where the Nazis are pursuing a top-secret weapon – indirectly inspired by the Doctor himself after a passing conversation years earlier with a German scientist – which could change the course of the war.

== Continuity ==
The novel features a predecessor to UNIT called "LONGBOW". In a thread on the Usenet group rec.arts.drwho as to what this stood for, Parkin admitted he had only got as far as "League Of Nations Global..." He accepted Chris Schumacher's suggestion of "League Of Nations Global Bizarre Occurrences Watch".

== Writing and development ==
Parkin had recently completed an MA and his dissertation thesis was on postcolonial literature. The novel echoes that by showing reversals of familiar colonial perspectives. Parkin used several Xhosa words to reflect the background of the character of Roz Forrester. The novel is a historical story, which the range editor Rebecca Levene warned Parkin was more of a challenge to write.

This was Parkin’s first professional writing work. Levene described it as "one of the best first books we ever got from a writer".

The cover was by Nick Spender. He had previously done covers for some Target Doctor Who novelisations. Mark Jones was also considered for the cover, but not chosen.

== Audio adaptation ==
Just War

Big Finish Productions audio drama
- Series: Bernice Summerfield
- Release no.: 5
- Featuring: Bernice Summerfield
- Written by: Lance Parkin adapted by Jac Rayner
- Directed by: Gary Russell
- Produced by: Gary Russell
- Executive producer: Jason Haigh-Ellery
- Length: 1 hr 50 mins
- Release date: August 1999

In 1999, Just War was adapted by Big Finish Productions into an audio drama starring Lisa Bowerman as Bernice. The plot was changed to fit in with the run of Bernice audio dramas. Big Finish had begun by adapting New Adventure novels from the period after Virgin lost its licence to publish Doctor Who stories and the series turned its focus to Benny. Big Finish also had no Doctor Who licence at the time, but they decided to dramatise two Doctor Who New Adventures, adapting them to remove the Doctor Who references. Thus, the audio adaptation achieves time travel through the use of Benny's Time Rings. The Doctor, Chris and Roz are removed from the narrative, with Jason Kane's role replacing some elements of the parts played by the Doctor and Chris from the novel.

The adaptation was written by Jacqueline Rayner, who adapted most of this first series of Benny audios.

=== Cast ===
- Bernice Summerfield — Lisa Bowerman
- Jason Kane — Stephen Fewell
- Oberst Oskar Steinmann — Michael Wade
- Standardtenfuhrer Joachim Wolff — Mark Gatiss
- Ma Doras — Maggie Stables
- Nurse Rosa Kitzel — Nicky Golding
- Private Franz Hutter — Anthony Keetch
- Private Gerhard Flur — Simon Moore
