= Jacqueline Rayner =

British author

Jacqueline Rayner is a British author, best known for her work with the licensed fiction based on the long-running British science fiction television series Doctor Who.

== Biography ==
Her first professional writing credit came when she adapted Paul Cornell's Virgin New Adventure novel Oh No It Isn't! for the audio format, the first release by Big Finish. (The novel featured the character of Bernice Summerfield and was part of a spin-off series from Doctor Who.) She went on to do five of the six Bernice Summerfield audio adaptations and further work for Big Finish before going to work for BBC Books on their Doctor Who lines.

Her first novels came in 2001, with the Eighth Doctor Adventures novel EarthWorld for BBC Books and the Bernice Summerfield novel The Squire's Crystal for Big Finish. Rayner has written several other Doctor Who spin-offs and was also for a period the executive producer for the BBC on the Big Finish range of Doctor Who audio dramas. She has also contributed to the audio range as a writer. In all, her Doctor Who and related work (Bernice Summerfield stories), consists of five novels, a number of short stories and four original audio plays.

Rayner has edited several anthologies of Doctor Who short stories, mainly for Big Finish, and done work for Doctor Who Magazine. Beyond Doctor Who, her work includes the children's television tie-in book Horses Like Blaze.

With the start of the new television series of Doctor Who in 2005 and a shift in the BBC's Doctor Who related book output, Rayner has become, along with Justin Richards and Stephen Cole, one of the regular authors of the BBC's New Series Adventures. She has also abridged several of the books to be made into audiobooks.

Rayner was a member of the original Time Team of Doctor Who Magazine.

== Selected works ==
- Bernice Summerfield: Oh No It Isn't! (1998) – audio play (based on the novel by Paul Cornell)
- Bernice Summerfield: Walking to Babylon (1998) – audio play (based on the novel by Kate Orman)
- Bernice Summerfield: Birthright (1999) – audio play (based on the novel by Nigel Robinson)
- Bernice Summerfield: Just War (1999) – audio play (based on the novel by Lance Parkin)
- Bernice Summerfield: Making Myths (1999) – audio play
- Bernice Summerfield: Dragons' Wrath (2000) – audio play (based on the novel by Justin Richards)
- Doctor Who: The Marian Conspiracy (2000) – audio play
- Doctor Who: EarthWorld (2001)
- Pet Rescue: Horses Like Blaze (2001)
- Bernice Summerfield: The Squire's Crystal (2001)
- Doctor Who: Wolfsbane (2001)
- Bernice Summerfield: The Glass Prison (2002)
- Doctor Who: Doctor Who and the Pirates: Or the Lass That Lost a Sailor (2003) – audio play
- Professor Bernice Summerfield and the Grel Escape (2004) – audio play
- Doctor Who: Winner Takes All (2005)
- Professor Bernice Summerfield and the Kingdom of the Blind (2005) – audio play
- Doctor Who: The Stone Rose (2006)
- Doctor Who: The Last Dodo (2007)
- Doctor Who: 100 BC (2007) – audio play
- Doctor Who: The Doomwood Curse (2008) – audio play
- Doctor Who: The Pictures of Emptiness (The Darksmith Legacy Book 8) (2009)
- Doctor Who: The Transit of Venus (2009) – audio play
- Doctor Who: The Suffering (2010) – audio play
- Bernice Summerfield: The Temple of Questions (2011) – audio play
- Doctor Who: Love and War (2012) – audio play (based on the novel by Paul Cornell)
- Doctor Who: Magic of the Angels (2012)
- Doctor Who: Step Back in Time (2012) – with Richard Dungworth
- Bernice Summerfield: Many Happy Returns (2012) – audio play (with Xanna Eve Chown, Stephen Cole, Paul Cornell, Stephen Fewell, Simon Guerrier, Scott Handcock, Rebecca Levene, Justin Richards, Miles Richardson, Eddie Robson and Dave Stone)
- Doctor Who: Starborn (2014) – audio play
- Doctor Who: The Highest Science (2014) – audio play (based on the novel by Gareth Roberts)
