= Scott Handcock =

English writer, director and producer

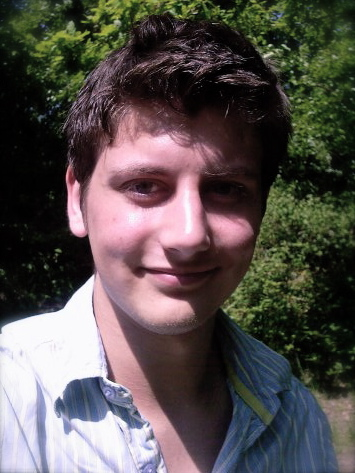
- Handcock in 2008
- Born: 8 November 1984 (age 40); Birmingham, England
- Occupation(s): Writer, director, producer

Scott Handcock (born 8 November 1984) is an English writer, director and producer who has been involved in a number of audio plays for Big Finish Productions. After sixteen years with the company, it was announced in 2022 that Handcock would leave his role at Big Finish and join television production company Bad Wolf as the script editor for the British science fiction TV series Doctor Who, beginning with the show's fourteenth series.

Previously, Handcock worked for BBC Wales as a production runner on the third and fourth series of Doctor Who Confidential, the animated Doctor Who adventure The Infinite Quest, and the second series of The Sarah Jane Adventures and as production secretary for the sixth series of Doctor Who. With Big Finish, he served as producer for series such as The Confessions of Dorian Gray, Gallifrey and The War Master, as well as a variety Doctor Who releases.

== Writing credits ==
=== Audio drama ===
- Dark Shadows: The Book of Temptation (released September 2006)
- Bernice Summerfield: The Oracle of Delphi (released November 2006)
- Dark Shadows: The Christmas Presence (released January 2007)
- Dark Shadows: The Skin Walkers (released November 2008)
- Doctor Who: The Magician's Oath (released April 2009)
- Gallifrey: Annihilation with Gary Russell (released March 2011)
- Bernice Summerfield: Judgement Day (released September 2011)
- Dark Shadows: Speak No Evil (released August 2012)
- Bernice Summerfield: Shades of Gray (released September 2012)
- Bernice Summerfield: Many Happy Returns with Xanna Eve Chown, Stephen Cole, Paul Cornell, Stephen Fewell, Simon Guerrier, Rebecca Levene, Jacqueline Rayner, Justin Richards, Miles Richardson, Eddie Robson and Dave Stone (released November 2012)
- The Confessions of Dorian Gray: The Heart That Lives Alone (released November 2012)
- The Confessions of Dorian Gray: Running Away With You (released August 2013)
- Gallifrey: Extermination (released October 2013)
- Bernice Summerfield: In Living Memory with Gary Russell (released December 2013)
- The Confessions of Dorian Gray: Displacement Activity (released November 2014)
- The Confessions of Dorian Gray: The Darkest Hour (released November 2014)
- Gallifrey: Intervention Earth with David Llewellyn (released February 2015)
- Iris Wildthyme: An Extraterrestrial Werewolf in Belgium (released August 2015)
- Doctor Who: Mind of the Hodiac with Russell T Davies (released March 2022)

=== Audiobooks ===
- Dark Shadows: The Skin Walkers (released November 2008)
- Doctor Who: The Magician's Oath (released April 2009)
- Doctor Who: The Rising Night (released July 2009)
- The Sarah Jane Adventures: The Shadow People (released October 2009)
- Doctor Who: Snake Bite (released December 2012)

=== Short stories ===
- Attachments in Short Trips: Snapshots (2007; edited by Joseph Lidster)
- They Fell in Short Trips: The Ghosts of Christmas (2007; edited by Cavan Scott & Mark Wright)
- The Midnight Washerwomen in Iris: Abroad (Obverse Books 2010, edited by Paul Magrs and Stuart Douglas
- Platform Alteration in The Obverse Book of Ghosts (Obverse Books 2010, edited by Cavan Scott

== Acting credits ==
- The Oracle of Delphi (released November 2006) Plato
- I, Davros: Innocence (released September 2006) Kaled Officer
- I, Davros: Guilt (released December 2006) Thal Saboteur/Castan/Computer Voice
- Iris Wildthyme 2.1: The Sound of Fear (released February 2009) Mohanalee
- Iris Wildthyme 2.2: Land of Wonder (released March 2009) The White Rabbit
- Iris Wildthyme 2.3: The Two Irises (released April 2009) Barry
- Iris Wildthyme and the Claws of Santa (released November 2009) Alfredo
- Gallifrey: Reborn (released March 2011) Jevon
- Gallifrey: Disassembled (released March 2011) Jevon
- Gallifrey: Annihilation (released March 2011) Vekken
- Gallifrey: Forever (released March 2011) Jevon
- Doctor Who: Love and War (released October 2012) Piers Gavenal

Handcock is also credited as an extra on miscellaneous Big Finish audio dramas.

== Television credits ==
- Doctor Who Confidential, series 3–4 (2007–08) – production runner
- That Life (2007) – production runner
- Doctor Who: The Infinite Quest (2007) – production runner
- The Sarah Jane Adventures, series 2 (2008) – production runner
- Doctor Who, series 6 (2011) – production secretary
