= List of Doctor Who anthologies =

Since 2009, BBC Books have published several short story anthologies based on the TV series Doctor Who. Unlike their novels and audiobooks, which are published under the title of New Series Adventures, or their previous short story range Short Trips (1998–2000), these books are not considered part of a series, but are published irregularly and generally as stand-alones.

Previously, BBC had licensed out the rights to produce original prose fiction based on Doctor Who twice: to Virgin Publishing from 1994 to 1997, who published short story collections under the title Decalog; and to Big Finish Productions (better known for producing audio plays based on Doctor Who since 1999) from 2002 to 2009, who published their own line also titled Short Trips.

== The Doctor Who Stories (2009) ==
A book containing fourteen stories, with one of each previously appearing in each fourteen volumes of the Doctor Who Files series (published by BBC Children's Books), and another, previously unpublished, story.

== Tales of Trenzalore: The Eleventh Doctor's Last Stand (2014) ==
All these stories take place during the Eleventh Doctor's centuries-long defence of the town of Christmas on the planet Trenzalore, as depicted in the 2013 Christmas special "The Time of the Doctor".

Title	Plot	Enemy	Author
"Let it Snow"		Ice Warriors	Justin Richards
"An Apple a Day..."		Krynoid	George Mann
"Strangers in the Outland"		Autons	Paul Finch
"The Dreaming"	Aliganza Torp meets a sepulchral undertaker in a dark place who questions him about his name as well as the Doctor's. The undertaker explains that the Doctor thinks so little of him because he won't reveal his name. Then he tells Aliganza to hold out his hand.	the Mara, the Krotons	Mark Morris

== The Shakespeare Notebooks (2014) ==
Following the Tenth Doctor's encounter with William Shakespeare as depicted in the 2007 episode "The Shakespeare Code", this anthology is presented as a series of found documents, mostly alternative drafts to or author's notes about Shakespeare's plays, that demonstrate encounters with or visions of the Doctor.

All stories were written (without individual authorship being given) by James Goss, Julian Richards, Justin Richards and Matthew Sweet.

Title	Plot	Featuring	References
"Notes on a Play"		Eleventh Doctor	Hamlet
"Exits and Entrances"		Seventh Doctor	As You Like It
"The True Tragedy of Macbeth"	The Doctor and companions unwittingly take the place of the three witches in informing Macbeth and Banquo about their futures.	Second Doctor, Jamie, Zoe	Macbeth
"Cymbeline"		Eleventh Doctor	Cymbeline
"Diary Extract"	The Doctor sits in on a meeting between Shakespeare and Richard Burbage, giving his advice on their next play.	Fifth Doctor	Twelfth Night
"The Dream"		First Doctor	A Midsummer Night's Dream
"A Prologue"		War Doctor	the prologue to Henry V
"The True and Most Excellent Comedie of Romeo and Juliet"	The Doctor and friends try to help Romeo and Juliet fake their deaths without killing themselves.	Eleventh Doctor, Amy, Rory	Romeo and Juliet
"The Tempest - A Work in Progress"		Tenth Doctor	The Tempest
"Exit, by Another Means"		-	The Winter's Tale
"The Winter's Tale"		Eleventh Doctor	The Winter's Tale
"Antony and Cleopatra"		the Mara	Antony and Cleopatra
"Troilus and Cressida"	The Doctor returns to Troy to help bring about the end of the Trojan War.	First Doctor	Troilus and Cressida
"Pericles"		Romana I	Pericles, Prince of Tyre
"Coriolanus"		-	Coriolanus
"Master Faustus"	Christopher Marlowe receives a visit on the eve of his murder from a traveller in time who offers to help him change his future.	the Master	Faustus, the Last Night
"The Sonnets"	A series of sonnets describing the Doctor in different incarnations or during different adventures.	several Doctors	Shakespeare's sonnets
"As You Like It"		Sixth Doctor, Peri	As You Like It
"Double Falsehood"	The Doctor takes Alexander Pope and Lewis Theobald back to Shakespeare's time to see an original performance of a play recently resurfaced in Theobald's possession of which Pope is critical.	Ninth Doctor	Double Falsehood
"Hamlet"	The Doctor interrupts Hamlet's famous graveside speech to retrieve a skull he believes is a Fendahl.	Fourth Doctor	Hamlet
"Timon of Athens"		"Axonia"	Timon of Athens
"Hamlet's Soliloquy"	The Doctor helps Shakespeare write Hamlet's "To be, or not to be" speech, offering critiques along the way.	Fourth Doctor	Hamlet
"Academic Notes"		Sixth Doctor	Julius Caesar
"Ye Unearthly Childe"	A retelling of "An Unearthly Child", the very first episode of Doctor Who.	First Doctor, Susan, Ian, Barbara	
"Appendix - The Last Will"		Tenth Doctor, Donna	

== Time Trips (2015) ==
These stories were first published as a series of e-books, appearing every month or so in 2014. The hardcover collected edition features an additional, original story printed on the dust jacket.

Title	Plot	Featuring	Author
"The Death Pit"	Hotel receptionist Bryony notices guests keep disappearing, and can't find anyone interested in helping her investigate until the Doctor, trying to find Chicago, shows up.	Fourth Doctor	A. L. Kennedy
"Into the Nowhere"	To the Doctor's delight and Clara's astonishment, they land on a planet that's truly unknown—it's not on any maps, and it has no name. What could be so terrible that its existence has been erased?	Eleventh Doctor, Clara	Jenny Colgan
"Keeping Up with the Joneses"	The Doctor needs time to repair the TARDIS after hitting a temporal mine, but somehow finds himself inside a Welsh bed and breakfast run by a strangely familiar-looking Christina. The TARDIS seems to have enveloped Christina's entire town—and something else is trapped inside with it.	Tenth Doctor	Nick Harkaway
"Salt of the Earth"	Before their vacation on an Australian salt lake can get rolling, the Doctor and Jo find themselves looking into mysterious sculptures made of salt that look an awful lot like real people, in great pain.	Third Doctor, Jo	Trudi Canavan
"A Handful of Stardust"	When the Doctor discovers John Dee and his assistant have come across a "great disturbance in the cosmos" in 1572, he realizes they are all in terrible danger, not helped by the appearance of Dee's new associate claiming the academic rank of Master.	Sixth Doctor, Peri	Jake Arnott
"The Bog Warrior"	To guarantee peace, Prince Zircon has to choose a bride from the Bog People, dead men and women who have been resurrected, but he's in love with the enslaved Princess Ash, whose parents were deposed by the current Queen.	Tenth Doctor	Cecelia Ahern
"The Loneliness of the Long-Distance Time Traveller"	Struggling to get back to UNIT HQ, his body being destroyed by radiation, the Doctor arrives in the perfect village, where everyone is happy. But where is he really?	Third Doctor	Joanne Harris
"The Anti-Hero"	The Doctor is keen to explore the ancient Musaeum of Alexandria, and Zoe is keen to correct the advanced but outdated science of the era. An encounter with the legendary inventor Hero may turn out not to be a friendly visit, however.	Second Doctor, Jamie, Zoe	Stella Duffy
"The Long Way Down"	When the Doctor tries to install a flower box on the TARDIS while in flight, Clara must determine how to make the most of a split-second decision.	Twelfth Doctor, Clara	Jenny Colgan

== The Scientific Secrets of Doctor Who (2015) ==
A guide to some scientific elements of the Doctor Who universe, this volume featured a short story accompanying each chapter.

Title	Plot	Featuring	Author	Concept
"Sunset Over Venus"		Twelfth Doctor, Clara	Mark Wright	"Alien Life and Other Worlds"
"The Lost Generation"		Fourth Doctor, Sarah Jane	George Mann	space travel
"The Room with All the Doors"	Trapped in an endless series of empty rooms, the Doctor and the narrator must try to guess how and why they are there.	Second Doctor	James Goss	the multiverse
"The Hungry Night"		Ninth Doctor	Jonathan Morris	the TARDIS's energy source
"All the Empty Towers"	When the TARDIS lands in Blackpool in 2089 instead of 2015, the Doctor and Clara get a glimpse of what the planet's future holds.	Twelfth Doctor, Clara	Jenny Colgan	the future of the Earth
"Rewriting History"	When the Doctor leaves Martha with only a sock, she receives a visit from her future self, warning her to end her travels in time...	Tenth Doctor, Martha	James Swallow	the laws of time
"Silver Mosquitoes"		Twelfth Doctor, Clara	LM Myles	the practicalities of time travel
"In Search of Lost Time"		Eleventh Doctor	Una McCormack	time and memory
"Natural Regression"	Forced to land during the Last Great Time War, the Doctor meets a stranded group of scientists.	Eighth Doctor	Justin Richards	"What is a Time War?"
"Potential Energy"		Sixth Doctor, Peri	Jacqueline Rayner	"The History of Earth"
"The Arboreals"		First Doctor, Susan	Marc Platt	evolution
"The Piper"		Third Doctor, Jo	Mark Morris	"Man and Machine"
"The Girl Who Stole the Stars"		Seventh Doctor, Ace, Raine	Andrew Cartmel	artificial intelligence
"The Mercy Seats"		Twelfth Doctor	David Llewellyn	"Entropy and Death"
"The Constant Doctor"	The Doctor takes his friends to watch a re-enactment of a time he saved a planet, while they discuss how little they know about his recent change.	Fifth Doctor, Adric, Nyssa, Tegan; Twelfth Doctor	Andrew Smith	regeneration

== The Legends of Ashildr (2015) ==
Stories of Ashildr, the woman who lived, in the many years between the Doctor's first two encounters with her in "The Girl Who Died" and "The Woman Who Lived". Authors are Justin Richards, James Goss, David Llewellyn and Jenny Colgan.

== The Legends of River Song (2016) ==
Five stories featuring the adventures of River Song, the Doctor's time-travelling wife, both with and without the Doctor. The stories' authors are Jenny Colgan, Jacqueline Rayner, Steve Lyons, Guy Adams and Andy Lane.

== Twelve Doctors of Christmas (2016) ==
Title	Plot	Featuring	Author
"All I Want for Christmas"		First Doctor, Barbara, Ian and Vicki	Jacqueline Rayner
"A Comedy of Terrors"		Second Doctor, Jamie and Zoe	Colin Brake
"The Christmas Inversion"		Third Doctor, Jo, Yates, Jackie Tyler	Jacqueline Rayner
"Three Wise Men"		Fourth Doctor	Richard Dungworth
"Sontar's Little Helpers"		Fifth Doctor, Tegan and Turlough	Mike Tucker
"Fairy Tale of New New York"		Sixth Doctor, Mel	Gary Russell
"The Grotto"		Seventh Doctor, Ace	Mike Tucker
"Ghost of Christmas Past"		Eighth Doctor	Scott Handcock
"The Red Bicycle"		Ninth Doctor, Rose	Gary Russell
"Loose Wire"		Tenth Doctor	Richard Dungworth
"The Gift"		Eleventh Doctor	Scott Handcock
"The Persistence of Memory"		Twelfth Doctor, the Monk	Colin Brake

== The American Adventures (2016) ==
Six stories, all written by Justin Richards, depicting adventures the Twelfth Doctor takes between his travels with Clara Oswald, and all taking place in the United States at various points in the nineteenth, twentieth and twenty-first centuries.

== Myths and Legends (2017) ==
Stories based on Greek myths, presented as a collection of myths from many worlds in a Time Lord archive. All stories were written by Richard Dinnick.

Title	"Based on"	Plot	Featuring
"The Mondas Touch"	"the story of King Midas"		the Twelfth Doctor, Cybermen
"The Terrible Manussa"	"the story of Medusa"		the Sixth Doctor, the Mara
"The Unwanted Gift of Prophecy"	"the story of the Cumaean Sybil"		Harold Saxon, Lucy Saxon, the Master
"The Evil and the Deep Black Sky"	"the story of Cylla and Charybdis"		Omega
"Jorus and the Voganauts"	"the Argonauts' encounter with the clashing rocks of Symplegades"		Rassilon, Vogans
"The Vardon Horse"	"the story of the Wooden Horse of Troy"		the First Doctor, the Xeraphin
"Defiance of the New Bloods"	"the story of Prometheus"		Sontarans
"The Kingdom of the Blind"	"the Argonauts' escape from the Cyclops"		the Jagaroth
"The Labyrinthine Web"	"the story of Theseus and the Minotaur"		the Racnoss
"The Angels of Vengeance"	"the story of the three Furies and Orestes"		Weeping Angels
"The Jeopardy of Solar Proximity"	"the story of Daedalus and Icarus"		Ice Warriors
"The Multi-Faceted War"	"the story of Hercules and the Hydra"		Time Lords and Great Vampires
"the Enigma of Sisterhood"	"the lesser-known second riddle of the Sphinx"		Osirans
"Pandoric's Box"	"the story of Pandora"		Rassilon, the Moment

== Tales of Terror (2017) ==
Promoted as Hallowe'en stories, they focus on aspects of monsters and horror.

Title	Plot	Featuring	Monster	Author
"Murder in the Dark"	A party at a mansion is not what it seems when the boys and girls are taken away to partake in traditional games with a gruesome twist...	First Doctor, Steven, Dodo	the Celestial Toymaker	Jacqueline Rayner
"Something at the Door"	When the Doctor's companions find a Ouija board in a hidden room in the TARDIS, it opens the door to more than they expected...	Second Doctor, Polly, Ben, Jamie		Mike Tucker
"The Monster in the Woods"		Third Doctor, Jo, the Brigadier	a Dalek	Paul Magrs
"Toil and Trouble"		Fourth Doctor, Sarah Jane, Harry	Carrionites	Richard Dungworth
"Mark of the Medusa"		Fifth Doctor, Tegan, Turlough, Kamelion		Mike Tucker
"Trick or Treat"		Sixth Doctor	the Celestial Toymaker	Jacqueline Rayner
"The Living Image"		Seventh Doctor, Ace		Scott Handcock
"Organism 96"		Eighth Doctor		Paul Magrs
"The Patchwork Pierrot"		Ninth Doctor	a Cyberman	Scott Handcock
"Blood Will Out"		Tenth Doctor, Donna	the Family of Blood	Richard Dungworth
"The Mist of Sorrow"		Eleventh Doctor	the Weeping Angels	Craig Donaghy
"Baby Sleepy Face"		Twelfth Doctor		Craig Donaghy

== The Missy Chronicles (2018) ==
These stories tell of Missy's adventures mostly outside of those where her path crosses with the Doctor's.

Title	Plot	Featuring	Author
"Dismemberment"	Missy returns to the club where she always goes after regenerating, only to find it doesn't allow female members.		James Goss
"Lords and Masters"	Missy is sent on a mission by the Time Lords to stop scientists investigating time travel.	The General (from "The Day of the Doctor" and "Hell Bent")	Cavan Scott
"Teddy Sparkles Must Die!"			Paul Magrs
"The Liar, the Glitch and the War Zone"		Thirteenth Doctor	Peter Anghelides
"Girl Power!"	From inside the Vault, Missy tries to rally the women of history using social media.	Twelfth Doctor	Jacqueline Rayner
"Alit in Underland"	Faced with an uncertain future among Cybermen and her past self, and trying to redeem herself, Missy must decide her next move.	the "Harold Saxon" Master	Richard Dinnick

== Twelve Angels Weeping (2018) ==
Stories featuring monsters from the series, themed around the countdown of "The Twelve Days of Christmas". The anthology was written by Dave Rudden.

Title	Plot	Featuring
"Halfway Into the Dark"		
"Grey Matter"		Twelfth Doctor, Weeping Angels
"Red Planet"		Fourth Doctor, Leela, Ice Warriors
"Celestial Intervention — A Gallifreyan Noir"		
"Ghost in the Machine"		Sixth Doctor, Peri, Cybermen
"Student Bodies"		the Silence
"A Soldier's Education"		Sontarans
"The Red-Eyed League"		Madame Vastra, Jenny Flint, and Strax
"The Heist"		Ood
"The King in Glass"		Eleventh Doctor, Zygons
"The Third Wise Man"		War Doctor, Daleks, Davros
"The Rhino of Twenty-Three Strand Street"		Thirteenth Doctor, Judoon
"Anything You Can Do"		the Doctor, the Master

== The Target Storybook (2019) ==
These stories are explicitly meant to be linked to televised stories through in-universe elements and characters.

Title	Author	Featuring	Plot	Links
"Gatecrashers"	Joy Wilkinson	Thirteenth Doctor, Ryan, Yasmin, Graham	Team TARDIS come across a world where every room is separate—and every person.	The story takes place right after the episode "The Witchfinders" (also written by Wilkinson).
"Journey Out of Terror"	Simon Guerrier	First Doctor, Ian, Barbara	When they get separated from Vicki, the Doctor, Ian and Barbara resort to the TARDIS's telepathic circuits to try to get back to her.	Takes place during The Chase, after the events of the episode "Journey Into Terror".
"Save Yourself"	Terrance Dicks	Second Doctor, the War Lord	Captured and put on trial by the Time Lords, the Doctor is given hope of escape if he performs secret missions for them.	Follows on the Doctor's trial in The War Games, which also introduced the War Lord.
"The Clean Air Act"	Matthew Sweet	Third Doctor, Jo, the Brigadier, Benton, Yates	UNIT investigates a neighbourhood where one family escaped unscathed from a mysterious and sudden absence of air.	Parts of the story are told through excerpts from Sir Charles Grover's book Last Chance for Man (and the Doctor declines to write its foreword); the book and Sir Charles feature in Invasion of the Dinosaurs.
"Punting"	Susie Day	Fourth Doctor, Romana II	The Doctor and Romana are trapped in the Time Vortex while punting at Cambridge.	Explains what happened to the Fourth Doctor during the events of "The Five Doctors" (in that story, his scenes are created purely from unused footage from the incomplete serial Shada).
"The Dark River"	Matthew Waterhouse	Adric, Nyssa	When the Doctor asks Adric and Nyssa to move his TARDIS, they accidentally land in the American South and journey with an escaped slave to recover the TARDIS.	Takes place during The Visitation. Waterhouse portrayed Adric onscreen.
"Interstitial Insecurity"	Colin Baker	Sixth Doctor, the Valeyard	The Doctor journeys inside the Matrix to prepare his defence, where his host shows him evidence from past and future experiences.	Takes place during The Trial of a Time Lord serial, between Mindwarp and Terror of the Vervoids. Baker portrayed the Sixth Doctor onscreen.
"The Slyther of Shoreditch"	Mike Tucker	Seventh Doctor	In 1963 London to retrieve the Hand of Omega, the Doctor is approached by a Time Lord who warns him that the Daleks have brought a modified Slyther from Skaro to help in their search.	This takes place during Remembrance of the Daleks. The Time Lord messenger is the one seen at the beginning of Genesis of the Daleks.
"We Can't Stop What's Coming"	Steve Cole	Eighth Doctor, Fitz, Trix	A team of accountants sent on a hunting mission find the time-travel tech they're testing has a more sinister purpose.	Fitz and Trix are companions in the Eighth Doctor Adventures series of novels (when the show was off the air). Hints are made to the upcoming Last Great Time War, which the Eighth Doctor experiences in his second onscreen appearance, "The Night of the Doctor".
"Decoy"	George Mann	War Doctor, Rassilon	When Rassilon creates an Auton duplicate of the Doctor to promote his own missions, the Doctor takes matters into his own hands.	The War Doctor appears in "The Day of the Doctor". His and Rassilon's difficulty working together are glimpsed in "The End of Time" and "Hell Bent".
"Grounded"	Una McCormack	Clive Finch	Clive takes a break from his research into the Doctor when he and his son Ben are called to help with a mysterious alien signal.	Clive and his research on the Doctor help Rose Tyler find the Ninth Doctor in the new series' first episode, "Rose".
"The Turning of the Tide"	Jenny Colgan	Meta-Crisis Tenth Doctor, Rose	Rose must decide how to proceed when a robot worm asks for the Doctor's help—in the wrong universe.	The half-human Doctor duplicate settles with Rose in a parallel universe in "Journey's End".
"Citation Needed"	Jacqueline Rayner	The Encyclopedia Gallifreya, always recording and uploading the Doctor's adventures, unexpectedly becomes sentient when Clara spills one of its bottles. It sees the Doctor regenerate twice, questions its own purpose, and suffers an attack from Tzim-Sha and the Ux.		The Encyclopedia is seen in "Journey to the Centre of the TARDIS". Tzim-Sha and the Ux feature in "The Battle of Ranskoor Av Kolos".
"Pain Management"	Beverly Sanford	Twelfth Doctor, Bill, Nardole, Missy		
"Letters from the Front"	Vinay Patel			Features characters from "Demons of the Punjab", also written by Patel.

== Star Tales (2019) ==
Stories where the Doctor encounters famous figures from Earth's history, based on the Doctor's propensity to name-drop.

Title	Author	Featuring	Plot
"Chasing the Dawn"	Jenny T Colgan	Eleventh Doctor, Amelia Earhart	
"That's All Right, Mama"	Paul Magrs	Thirteenth Doctor, Elvis Presley	
"Einstein and the Doctor"	Jo Cotterill	Thirteenth Doctor, Albert Einstein, Fourth Doctor	
"Who-Dini?"	Steve Cole	Thirteenth Doctor, Harry Houdini, Twelfth Doctor	
"The Pythagoras Problem"	Trevor Baxendale	Thirteenth Doctor, Pythagoras	
"Mission of the KaaDak"	Mike Tucker	Thirteenth Doctor, Audrey Hepburn	

== The Wintertime Paradox (2020) ==
A second Christmas-themed anthology by author Dave Rudden. An additional linking story, "Canaries", first released online and included in the e-book version, tied into the Time Lord Victorious multimedia storyline.

Title	Plot	Featuring
"He's Behind You"		Tenth Doctor, Rose Tyler
"Father of the Daleks"		Davros, the Doctor (multiple including Eleventh)
"Inflicting Christmas"		Twelfth Doctor, Bill Potts
"For the Girl Who Has Everything"		Petronella Osgood
"Visiting Hours"		Rory Williams, River Song
"We Will Feed You to the Trees"		Seventh Doctor
"Christmas with the Plasmavores"		Plasmavores
"A Girl Called Doubt"		Cybermen, Fifth Doctor
"A Perfect Christmas"		Madame Vastra, Jenny Flint, and Strax
"Missing Habitas Frond"		Missy
"A Day to Yourselves"		Ninth Doctor
"The Paradox Moon"		Thirteenth Doctor, Shadow Architect
