= David Bailey (writer) =

British editor and author

David Bailey is a British editor and author whose published output to date comprises a combination of short stories, audio dramas and magazine articles.

== Biography ==
Both before and since being professionally published, Bailey contributed to a number of Doctor Who fanzines in writing and editorial capacities, including Matrix, Silver Carrier and Cottage Under Siege.

As an editor, he worked for the British magazine publisher Titan from 1997 to 2000 during which time he edited their Simpsons and Xena, Warrior Princess titles among others.

His first professionally published writing was a number of articles for the magazine Cult Times, starting in 1996. Since that time, he has contributed articles to a wide range of factual publications, including consumer guides and television listing magazines.

Subsequently, he co-authored a number of guidebooks to television series such as Friends and Frasier. These were produced by Virgin Publishing.

The body of David Bailey's fiction writing, both audio and prose, has been produced for Big Finish Productions' range of Doctor Who and Doctor Who derived materials.

In 2011, he decided to start writing under the pen name of David Bryher as his real name meant that he was hard to find on Google.

== Published fiction ==
In print, Bailey has contributed to several of Big Finish's Short Trips range of short story collections, and edited one of them.

- The Canvey Angels in Short Trips: Companions, 2003, edited by Jacqueline Rayner
- Soul Mate in Short Trips: A Universe of Terrors, 2003, edited by John Binns
- Syntax in Short Trips: Life Science, 2004, edited by John Binns
- Telling Tales in Short Trips: Seven Deadly Sins, edited by Bailey

== Audio ==
In audio, he has written four dramas for the company's Bernice Summerfield range, which continues the story of the character originally created as a companion for The Doctor in Virgin Publishing's New Adventures series.

- The Secret of Cassandra (2000)
- The Skymines of Karthos (2001)
- The Poison Seas (2003)
- The Heart's Desire (2005) (co-written with Neil Corry).

== Other work ==
He occasionally writes for Doctor Who Magazine.

He wrote the scripts for the Doctor Who video game, The Eternity Clock.
