= Doctor Who and the Pirates =

2003 Doctor Who audio drama

Doctor Who and the Pirates or The Lass That Lost A Sailor

Big Finish Productions audio drama
- Series: Doctor Who
- Release no.: 43
- Featuring: Sixth Doctor; Evelyn Smythe
- Written by: Jacqueline Rayner
- Directed by: Barnaby Edwards
- Produced by: Gary Russell; Jason Haigh-Ellery
- Executive producer: Jacqueline Rayner
- Production code: 7CH
- Length: 1 hr 40 mins
- Release date: April 2003
- Preceded by: Jubilee
- Followed by: Real Time

Doctor Who and the Pirates, or The Lass That Lost a Sailor, is a Big Finish Productions audio drama based on the long-running British science fiction television series Doctor Who. It is the first musical story in the series' history.

== Plot ==
Evelyn begins telling a story to one of her students, Sally, about a 19th century sea adventure she has taken with the Doctor. Pirates boarded their ship in the Caribbean Sea. The Doctor arrives and helps Evelyn tell the story, punctuating the narrative with frequent songs set to the tunes of Gilbert and Sullivan songs. In the story they travel to the Ruby Islands (where precious gems are buried) together with their crew and the pirates. Evelyn is profoundly upset when she is unable to stop the murderous pirate captain, Red Jasper, from beating a cabin boy to death. The crew and their incompetent skipper, Captain Swan, with the help of the Doctor, capture the pirate ship, stranding the pirates with a fake treasure map.

The Doctor and Evelyn return to the TARDIS, and, still shaken, she returns home, loath to witness further terrifying occurrences. There, however, she finds a suicide note from Sally, who is grieving someone dear to her who has been killed in a car accident; Sally blames herself, because she was driving the vehicle. To help her student Evelyn and the Doctor to travel back in time to dissuade Sally from killing herself, showing her that she is loved.

== Cast ==
- The Doctor — Colin Baker
- Evelyn Smythe — Maggie Stables
- Jem — Dan Barratt
- Sally — Helen Goldwyn
- Red Jasper — Bill Oddie
- Swan — Nicholas Pegg
- Merryweather — Mark Siney
- Mate/Sailor/Pirate — Timothy Sutton

== Music ==
The songs use substituted lyrics to tunes from various Gilbert and Sullivan operas. The Doctor sings: "I am the very model of a Gallifreyan buccaneer" a pastiche of the "Major-General's Song". Other Gilbert and Sullivan song pastiches include "An assassin's lot is not a happy one", based on the "A Policeman's Lot Is Not a happy one", from The Pirates of Penzance, and "I'm Jasper's man", to the tune of "I am so proud" from The Mikado. Music from more of the Savoy operas is used elsewhere in it, such as one of the pirates humming "Rising Early in the Morning" from The Gondoliers.

== Critical reaction ==
A reviewer for Metro wrote that Baker "has a marvellous singing voice." A reviewer for Doctor Who TV selected the episode as one of the best audio dramas in its season. In a 50th Anniversary review, Tor.com selected the episode for its list of "excellent ones".
