= Nick Wallace =

British novelist and short story writer

Nick Wallace (born 1972) is a novelist and short story writer based in Tunbridge Wells, best known for his work in Doctor Who spin-offs.

== Biography ==
Wallace works in media consultancy in London, advising on script development and programme acquisition for broadcasters and production companies worldwide. His first published work was the short story Five Dimensional Thinking in the Big Finish Productions Bernice Summerfield short story collection, Life During Wartime (Big Finish Productions, 2003), edited by Paul Cornell. The short story UNIT Christmas Parties: First Christmas followed in the Short Trips collection A Christmas Treasury (Big Finish Productions, 2004), also edited by Paul Cornell.

Wallace's first novel, Fear Itself was published in 2005. The novel, which Wallace says was inspired by Ian Rankin’s Inspector Rebus novels, has had a positive reception from reviewers and fans alike. Fear Itself is the only BBC novel to date featuring solely the Eighth Doctor not to be published as part of the ongoing Eighth Doctor Adventures line; instead, it was published as a Past Doctor Adventure. This means that whilst Wallace's novel was the last book to feature the Eighth Doctor, it is set at an earlier point in the Doctor's life than Lance Parkin's The Gallifrey Chronicles, which is the last Eighth Doctor Adventure.

He is the editor of the 2006 short story collection Collected Works, another in the Bernice Summerfield range produced by Big Finish. His first audio play, The Judas Gift, was released in 2007.

== Bibliography ==
=== Novels ===
- Fear Itself (BBC, 2005)

=== Novellas ===
- The Irredeemable Love (in Miss Wildthyme and Friends Investigate, Obverse Books, 2010)

=== Short stories ===
- Five Dimensional Thinking (in Life During Wartime (Big Finish Productions, 2003)
- UNIT Christmas Parties: First Christmas (in A Christmas Treasury, Big Finish Productions, 2004)

=== As editor ===
- Collected Works (Big Finish Productions, 2006)

=== Audio plays ===
- Bernice Summerfield: The Judas Gift, (Big Finish Productions, 2007)
- Bernice Summerfield: Glory Days, (Big Finish Productions, 2009)
- Blake's 7: Kerr, (Big Finish Productions, 2013)
- Doctor Who: The Dying Light, (Big Finish Productions, 2013)
- The Worlds of Doctor Who: Second Sight, (with Justin Richards; Big Finish Productions, 2014)
- Doctor Who: A Home From Home, (Big Finish Productions, 2014)
- Doctor Who: The Ghost Trap, (Big Finish Productions, 2015)
- Doctor Who: Etheria, (Big Finish Productions, 2015)
- Doctor Who: The Age of Endurance, (Big Finish Productions, 2016)
