= Oh No It Isn't! =

1997 novel by Paul Cornell

- Author: Paul Cornell
- Cover artist: Jon Sullivan
- Series: Doctor Who book: The New Adventures
- Release number: 1
- Subject: Featuring: Bernice Summerfield
- Publisher: Virgin Books
- Publication date: May 1997
- ISBN: 0426205073
- Preceded by: The Dying Days
- Followed by: Dragons' Wrath

Oh No It Isn't! is a novel published in 1997 by Paul Cornell from the Virgin New Adventures featuring the fictional archaeologist Bernice Summerfield.

== Writing and development ==
The New Adventures were a series of novels based on the long-running British science fiction television series Doctor Who, made by the BBC. They had originally been licensed Doctor Who stories, but in the wake of the return of Doctor Who to television screens with the 1996 movie, the BBC did not renew publisher Virgin Books' licence.

Virgin had for some time planned for a spin-off series based on the characters and settings created in the Doctor Who New Adventures. With the licence gone, they continued the monthly release schedule of the New Adventures, but switched to stories featuring the character of Bernice Summerfield (known as Benny), beginning with Oh No It Isn't!. The author, Paul Cornell, had originally created Benny as a companion for the Doctor. He attended a mid-July 1996 meeting at Virgin with the New Adventures editorial team and several regular authors for the line to plan the basics of the Benny books.

Benny appeared regularly in the Doctor Who New Adventures for a period, before ceasing travelling with the Doctor in another Cornell-penned work, Happy Endings. She was re-introduced as a regular character in the last Doctor Who New Adventure, The Dying Days by Lance Parkin, who had also been at the Benny books planning meeting, which led into Oh No It Isn't!.

Oh No It Isn't! also provided the initial set-up and background to the Benny-led New Adventures that followed, including re-introducing the Doctor's pet cat Wolsey (originally from Cornell's New Adventure Human Nature) and the artificial intelligence known as God (originally from the New Adventure The Also People). The book also introduces the alien race the Grel, who would re-appear in later Benny stories. The cover features Benny and Wolsey, and was by Jon Sullivan.

The novel title and content reference the traditions of pantomime, reflecting Cornell's interest in traditional conceptions and icons of Englishness. Englishness and whimsy were intended to be part of the Benny book series.

== Plot ==
Bernice Summerfield's investigation into the lost civilisation of Perfection takes a turn for the strange when her cat Wolsey turns into the pantomime character Puss in Boots.

== Audio adaptation ==
Oh No It Isn't!

Big Finish Productions audio drama
- Series: Bernice Summerfield
- Release no.: 1
- Featuring: Bernice Summerfield
- Written by: Paul Cornell adapted by Jac Rayner
- Directed by: Nicholas Briggs
- Produced by: Gary Russell
- Executive producer: Jason Haigh-Ellery
- Length: 1 hr 50 mins
- Release date: September 1998

In 1998, Oh No It Isn't! was adapted by Big Finish Productions into an audio drama starring Lisa Bowerman as Bernice. This was the debut release by Big Finish, who started with a series of Bernice Summerfield-led adaptations of New Adventure novels before later obtaining a licence to do original Doctor Who stories.

Cornell was asked to do the adaptation but was too busy, instead suggesting his then girlfriend Jacqueline Rayner could do it. Rayner went on to write all but one of Big Finish's New Adventure adaptations.

The audio drama also features actor Nicholas Courtney who is better known for playing the recurring character of Brigadier Lethbridge-Stewart in the television series Doctor Who.

=== Cast ===
- Bernice Summerfield — Lisa Bowerman
- Wolsey the Cat — Nicholas Courtney
- Jayne Waspo/Bitchy — Jo Castleton
- Michael Doran/Cute — Jonathan Brüün
- Captain Balsam/King Rupert — Colin McIntyre
- Lt Prince/Prince Charming — Nicholas Briggs
- Professor Candy/Dame Candy — James Campbell
- The Grand Vizier — Mark Gatiss
- The Grel Master — Alistair Lock
