= Lance Parkin =

British author

Lance Parkin is a British author. He is best known for writing fiction and reference books for television series, in particular Doctor Who (and spin-offs including the Virgin New Adventures and Faction Paradox) and as a storyliner on Emmerdale.

== Doctor Who ==
Parkin first became known in Doctor Who fan circles, writing both criticism and fan fiction. His most notable work was for Seventh Door Fanzines, including the novella Snare in the Odyssey series (which he edited for a period) and 1994's The Doctor Who Chronology, a detailed timeline of events in the Doctor Who universe. The Odyssey series later included novellas by Parkin's then-girlfriend Cassandra May and his later protégé Mark Clapham.

Parkin's first professional novel, Just War, published in 1996, for Virgin's New Adventures series of original fiction Doctor Who novels. This was followed by A History of the Universe (a re-working of his Chronology) and a second novel, Cold Fusion, for Virgin's Missing Adventures series.

Virgin lost the licence to publish Doctor Who fiction, and Parkin landed the job of writing the last New Adventure to feature the character of the Doctor, 1997's The Dying Days. This was also the only Virgin novel to feature the eighth incarnation of the Doctor, played in the 1996 Doctor Who television movie by Paul McGann. The Virgin Who books went out of print with the loss of the Doctor Who licence and The Dying Days. The New Adventures continued without the Doctor Who label and Parkin returned to the series with 1998's Beige Planet Mars, written with Mark Clapham.

Parkin continued writing official Doctor Who prose fiction for BBC Books, including a number of event books, including the 35th anniversary celebration The Infinity Doctors. The Dying Days became the first of several Virgin Doctor Who books to be re-worked as e-books for the BBC's Doctor Who website. He wrote the last in BBC series of eighth Doctor novel adventures, The Gallifrey Chronicles (2005). In 2006 he updated A History of the Universe for Mad Norwegian with AHistory: An Unauthorized History of the Doctor Who Universe. In June 2008 it was announced that he would write a New Series Adventures novel, The Eyeless, starring the Tenth Doctor alone for release on Boxing Day 2008.

A trademark of Parkin's Doctor Who novels is the inclusion of a character written as if played by Ian Richardson, beginning with Oscar Steinmann in Just War. Parkin has said "I’m sure there was a very good reason for that at one point, but if there is, I’ve forgotten it".

== Other works ==
Around 1999, Parkin joined Virgin alumni Rebecca Levene and Gareth Roberts to work on the production team of television soap Emmerdale. He also once appeared as an extra in the series. Though he never scripted episodes for television, he later wrote both non-fiction (including 30 Years of Emmerdale) and fiction (Mandy's Secret Diary, Their Finest Hour) connected to the series. He has not worked in TV since leaving Emmerdale.

Parkin also writes non-fiction, including guides to Star Trek (Beyond the Final Frontier) and Philip Pullman's His Dark Materials series (Dark Matters: An Unofficial and Unauthorised Guide to Philip Pullman's 'Dark Materials' Trilogy), both written with long-time friend Mark Jones, and Secret Identities: An Unofficial and Unauthorised Guide to Alias with Mark Clapham.

This was followed by Miranda, a comic based on a character in his Doctor Who novel Father Time. The comic was published through Comeuppance Comics, an independent comic company that shut down after three issues. With Parkin's permission, Miranda was killed off in the Doctor Who book Sometime Never... by Justin Richards.

Parkin also wrote The Winning Side, the first in the Time Hunter novella series, a spin-off from Telos Publishing's line of official Doctor Who novellas, and Warlords of Utopia, the third in Mad Norwegian Press's Faction Paradox series of novels.

Parkin had a regular column, "Beige Planet Lance" in the Doctor Who fanzine Enlightenment, which was published by the Doctor Who Information Network.

In 2014, he published a biography of comics writer Alan Moore, entitled Magic Words.

== Selected bibliography ==
=== Doctor Who and related works ===
- Virgin New Adventures/Virgin Missing Adventures:
  - Just War (1996; featuring the Seventh Doctor)
  - Cold Fusion (1996; featuring the Fifth and Seventh Doctors)
  - The Dying Days (1997; featuring the Eighth Doctor)
  - Beige Planet Mars (with Mark Clapham, 1998; featuring Bernice Summerfield)
- BBC Books' Doctor Who series:
  - The Infinity Doctors (1998; featuring an unspecified Doctor)
  - Father Time (2001; featuring the Eighth Doctor)
  - Trading Futures (2002; featuring the Eighth Doctor)
  - The Gallifrey Chronicles (2005; the last novel in the regular series featuring the Eighth Doctor)
  - The Eyeless (December 2008; featuring the Tenth Doctor)
- Big Finish Productions:
  - Just War (1999; Bernice Summerfield audio by Jacqueline Rayner, based on the novel by Lance Parkin)
  - The Extinction Event (2001; Bernice Summerfield audio)
  - Primeval (2001; Doctor Who audio featuring the Fifth Doctor)
  - Davros (2003; Doctor Who audio featuring the Sixth Doctor)
  - The Big Hunt (2004; Bernice Summerfield novel)
  - I, Davros: Corruption (2006; third title in I, Davros audio miniseries)
  - The Company of Friends: Benny's Story (2009; Doctor Who audio featuring the Eighth Doctor & Bernice Summerfield)
  - Venus Mantrap (2009; Bernice Summerfield audio; with Mark Clapham)
- Other Doctor Who related works:
  - A History of the Universe (1996; reference book published by Virgin)
  - Cyberon (2000; BBV Productions direct-to-video film)
  - The Winning Side (2003; Telos Publishing Time Hunter novella)
  - Warlords of Utopia (2004; Mad Norwegian Press Faction Paradox novel)
  - AHistory: An Unofficial History of the Doctor Who Universe (Released 2006; revised and vastly expanded version of A History of the Universe; re-released in 2007 and 2012. Mad Norwegian Press)

=== Other works ===
- Mandy’s Secret Diary (2000; Emmerdale novel)
- Emmerdale: Their Finest Hour (2001; novel)
- Alan Moore (Pocket Essentials: Comics) (2001)
- 30 Years of Emmerdale (2002; reference work)
- Beyond the Final Frontier (with Mark Jones, 2003; unauthorised guide to Star Trek)
- Secret Identities: An Unofficial and Unauthorised Guide to Alias (with Mark Clapham, 2003)
- Dark Matters: The Unofficial and Unauthorised to Philip Pullman's International Bestselling 'His Dark Materials' Trilogy (with Mark Jones, 2007)
- "Ichabod" (co-created by H. Christian Vang, published in issue two of Kaliber Comics, December 2011)
- Magic Words: The Extraordinary Life of Alan Moore (2014)
