= Maggie Stables =

British actress

Margaret Helen Stables (1932-2014) was a British actress who played the part of the companion Evelyn Smythe in a range of audio dramas by Big Finish Productions based on the BBC television series Doctor Who.

== Career ==
Stables began acting as a second career after retiring from a long-held position as a French teacher. After some experience in musical theatre, in 1991 she acted in a production of Jane Eyre, with Nicholas Briggs. This led to Briggs' later casting Stables as Ruthley in Big Finish's first Doctor Who play, The Sirens of Time, and as Evelyn the following year.

Stables appeared in several Big Finish audio roles beyond Evelyn. In addition to Ruthley, Stables appeared in Zagreus as the Great Mother, in Sarah Jane Smith: The TAO Connection as Mrs Lythe, and the Bernice Summerfield audio drama Just War as Ma Doras. Stables also portrayed Evelyn Smythe in the webcast Doctor Who story Real Time. Stables was a justice of the peace from 1971 to 2003, sitting in both the Edmonton and Haringey Petty sessions.

== Last years and death ==
Stables retired from acting in 2013 due to a long-term illness. She died in her sleep, on 26 September 2014.
