= The Highest Science =

1993 novel by Gareth Roberts

- Author: Gareth Roberts
- Cover artist: Peter Elson
- Series: Doctor Who book: Virgin New Adventures
- Release number: 11
- Subject: Featuring: Seventh Doctor; Bernice
- Publisher: Virgin Books
- Publication date: February 1993
- ISBN: 0-426-20377-1
- Preceded by: Transit
- Followed by: The Pit

The Highest Science is an original novel written by Gareth Roberts and based on the long-running British science fiction television series Doctor Who. It features the Seventh Doctor and Bernice and the first appearance of the recurring monsters, the Chelonians. A prelude to the novel, also penned by Roberts, appeared in Doctor Who Magazine #196.

The novel was going to be adapted into the 2009 Doctor Who Easter special, making this story, like Human Nature, an early "version" of a canonical television story; the concept was continually altered, however, resulting in "Planet of the Dead". The Chelonians were mentioned onscreen in the episode "The Pandorica Opens" as one of the Doctor's enemy species who have banded together to defeat him, suggesting that the events of the novel (like those of the television-acknowledged novel The Monsters Inside) have in fact happened.

== Chelonians ==
This novel sees the first appearance of the Chelonians, a race of cybernetic humanoid tortoises. They returned in Zamper and also featured in the Fourth Doctor missing adventure The Well-Mannered War, as well as in the short stories The Hungry Bomb, Fegovy, and The Body Bank, all by Gareth Roberts and published in, respectively, the Doctor Who Magazine Yearbook 1995, the anthology Decalog 3: Consequences, and the Doctor Who Storybook 2008. They are also mentioned in the New Adventures books Oh No It Isn't! and Beyond the Sun, featuring Bernice Summerfield. River Song listed the Chelonians amongst the races with fleets orbiting Earth in "The Pandorica Opens". The Chelonians are war-like, hermaphroditic and lay eggs. They have cybernetic enhancements that include X-ray vision and improved hearing, but this advanced state of technology often causes them to consider human-beings as a form of parasite to be removed.

Contrary to how they are depicted on the dust jacket art to this book and Zamper, they walk on all fours.

== Audio Adaptation ==
In December 2014 Big Finish Productions released an audio adaptation of the novel.
