= The Pit (Penswick novel) =

1993 novel by Neil Penswick

- Author: Neil Penswick
- Cover artist: Peter Elson
- Series: Doctor Who book: Virgin New Adventures
- Release number: 12
- Subject: Featuring: Seventh Doctor; Bernice
- Publisher: Virgin Books
- Publication date: March 1993
- ISBN: 0-426-20378-X
- Preceded by: The Highest Science
- Followed by: Deceit

The Pit is an original novel written by Neil Penswick and based on the long-running British science fiction television series Doctor Who. It features the Seventh Doctor and Bernice. A prelude to the novel, also penned by Penswick, appeared in Doctor Who Magazine #197.

== Synopsis ==
In an attempt to lighten the Doctor's mood, his companion Bernice suggests an investigation of a planetary system of seven planets that had seemingly vanished. The TARDIS materializes on the worst of the seven and the two are assailed by multiple types of threats. The Doctor is thrown into another universe entirely. Bernice soon realizes the source of the dangers come from the Doctor's own past.
