= Patrick Chapman =

Irish poet, writer and screenwriter

- Born: 1968 (age 57–58); Ireland
- Website: www.patrickchapman.net

Patrick Chapman (born 1968) is an Irish poet, writer and screenwriter.

Chapman's first published work was Jazztown, released in 1991 by Raven Arts Press. This was followed five years later by The New Pornography, a collection of poems described as "darkly humorous" by The Irish Times. His story collection, The Wow Signal (Bluechrome Publishing ISBN 9781904781752) was published in 2007. He also wrote the Doctor Who audio drama, "Fear of the Daleks" (Big Finish, 2007).

Based on his own published story of the same name, he wrote the short drama film Burning The Bed, which starred Gina McKee and Aidan Gillen. Burning The Bed was a prizewinner at the 2004 Worldfest film festival in Houston, Texas and was also named Best Narrative Short at the DeadCENTER Film Festival in Oklahoma City, Oklahoma.

Chapman has also written five episodes of the children's television series, Garth and Bev, for Kavaleer Productions. This aired on RTÉ in 2009 and Cbeebies in 2010, and has worldwide distribution.

Chapman is the co-founder, along with writer Philip Casey, of irishliteraryrevival.com, which seeks to create "a place where readers could find books no longer available elsewhere, and where writers could get a new audience for their texts, while stimulating interest in their work as a whole" and where all the books are placed on the site under a Creative Commons License.

== Bibliography ==
=== Poetry collections ===
His poetry collections include:

- Jazztown, (Raven Arts Press, 1991 ISBN 9781851860661)
- The New Pornography (Salmon Poetry, 1996 ISBN 9781897648773)
- Breaking Hearts And Traffic Lights (Salmon Poetry, 2007 ISBN 9781903392645)
- A Shopping Mall on Mars, (BlazeVOX, 2008 ISBN 9781934289624)
- The Darwin Vampires, (Salmon Poetry, 2010 ISBN 9781907056307)
- A Promiscuity of Spines: New & Selected Poems, (Salmon Poetry, 2012 ISBN 9781908836144)
- Slow Clocks of Decay, (Salmon Poetry, 2016 ISBN 9781910669426)

=== Stories ===
- The Wow Signal (Bluechrome, 2007)
- The Negative Cutter (Arlen House, 2014)

=== Film ===
- Burning the Bed (Songway Films/Fantastic Films, 2003), starring Gina McKee and Aidan Gillen

=== Audio Play ===
- "Doctor Who: Fear of the Daleks" (Big Finish, 2007)

=== Television ===
- "Garth and Bev" Five episodes (Kavaleer Productions, 2009/2010)
- "Wildernuts" Six episodes (Kavaleer Productions, 2013)
- "Bubble Bath Bay" Two episodes (Telegael/Cuan/Essential, 2014)
