= Bernice Summerfield =

Character in the Virgin New Adventures series of books

- Doctor Who character
- Bernice Summerfield portrayed by Lisa Bowerman in a promotional photo for Big Finish Productions
- First appearance: Love and War
- Created by: Paul Cornell
- Portrayed by: Lisa Bowerman (voice)

In-universe information
- Species: Human
- Affiliation: Seventh Doctor; Eighth Doctor; Twelfth Doctor; Alt Third Doctor (Unbound); St. Oscar's University, Dellah; The Braxiatel Collection
- Home: Beta Caprisis
- Home era: 26th century

Professor Bernice Surprise Summerfield, or simply Benny, is a fictional character created by author Paul Cornell as a new companion of the Seventh Doctor in Virgin Publishing's range of original full-length Doctor Who novels, the New Adventures. The New Adventures were licensed novels carrying on from where the Doctor Who television series had left off, featuring a number of writers that previously worked on the series, along with several new to the franchise. Summerfield was introduced in Cornell's novel Love and War in 1992, the first companion character original to the series.

Bernice would later go on to take the lead role of the New Adventures book series, upon Virgin Publishing losing access to the Doctor Who licence, in favour of the BBC's in-house publisher BBC Books. Having left the role as companion to the Doctor, the first of this spinoff soft-reboot was the story Oh No It Isn't! in 1997, also by her creator Paul Cornell. This was possible because an unusual contract on Virgin Publishing's front gave character rights to their creators as long as they could be used in future novels by the company, instead of control defaulting to Virgin or the BBC themselves. This marked Summerfield as the first companion to have a full series of licensed spinoff material.

Big Finish Productions would later take an interest in Benny, as their initial attempt to obtain the licence for official Doctor Who audio drama was rejected. In 1998, Big Finish made their first release, an adaptation of Cornell's Oh No It Isn't! done by Jacqueline Rayner for the new self-titled Bernice Summerfield audio range. As her personal debut in a performed medium, Summerfield would be portrayed by British actress Lisa Bowerman, who would continue the role into the modern day. After Oh No It Isn't!, Big Finish would produce five more adaptations of New Adventures novels Bernice appeared in. While Oh No It Isn't!, Beyond the Sun, Walking to Babylon, and Dragons' Wrath were all part of the Summerfield-led spinoff New Adventures, Birthright and Just War were versions of stories from the original Seventh Doctor range, heavily edited to remove the Doctor, Ace, Chris Cwej, and Roz Forrester, Bernice herself and her ex-husband Jason Kane filling their roles instead.

Towards the tail end of the first series of Bernice Summerfield, the final New Adventures novel, Twilight of the Gods, was released, marking the end of work by Virgin Publishing relating to Doctor Who media. Bernice's story would continue after a short time-skip, however, when Big Finish began producing original works in the Bernice Summerfield series, continuing their Bowerman-led audio dramas, in addition to their own books, taking the form of concurrent novels and anthologies, making her officially the lead of a multimedia franchise.

Over the years, Benny would make guest appearances in the mainline Doctor Who ranges, as well as other spinoffs later on, and have occasional crossover encounters with exclusive Doctor Who monsters such as the Daleks and Cybermen. These were rare, however, as the original Bernice Summerfield range was not allowed to even directly reference most material originating from the television series. These stories would follow her life events uninterrupted, story arcs always having direct transitions even when the rest of the cast changed, until the range concluded its main story with the boxset Missing Persons.

In 2014, Bernice Summerfield was rebooted with a time-skip, starting the audio drama series The New Adventures of Bernice Summerfield, now directly under the Doctor Who branding and allowing full crossover with the rest of the franchise. The first two series had her reuniting with the Seventh Doctor and Ace, the third series through to the seventh starring her opposite David Warner's alternative 'Unbound' third Doctor. The pairing was together up until past David Warner's death, the final boxset Blood and Steel and their appearance in the Dark Gallifrey series being released posthumously. Breaks between boxset releases were often filled by official audiobooks of the previously released Big Finish novels, narrated by Lisa Bowerman.

In 2024, Bernice was given another soft-reboot. Starting with The Eternity Club 1, it takes place after yet another time-skip, with a new, full supporting cast. Instead of boxsets, the series would continue as single-disc releases with two shorter audios per part of each four-part series. As she was fully independent of the Doctor again, with the release of The Dalek Eternity 1 in 2025, Bernice's audios quietly dropped The New Adventures from their titles. While officially part of the same series as before, directly continuing from The Eternity Club, and still containing the Doctor Who branding and licenses, promotion and cover art once again became simply Bernice Summerfield.

Official image of Bernice Summerfield, as used on the Bernice Summerfield Inside Story book, published October 2007

Big Finish has stated that Bernice Summerfield's audios unofficially hold the record for longest-running female-led science fiction audio series, as well as longest running female-led audio series. This would also have made her hold the title of longest-running science fiction audio series as a whole, however the official Guinness World Record is held by the Doctor Who: The Monthly Adventures due to her aforementioned brand reboot in 2014. Both of these statements are contestable however, as Ruby the Galactic Gumshoe by the ZBS Foundation has been running sporadically since 1982 and had a release in 2025, with no brand changes.

== Books ==
=== Doctor Who – The New Adventures ===
- Love and War by Paul Cornell
- Transit by Ben Aaronovitch
- The Highest Science by Gareth Roberts
- The Pit by Neil Penswick
- Deceit by Peter Darvill-Evans
- Lucifer Rising by Andy Lane and Jim Mortimore
- White Darkness by David A McIntee
- Shadowmind by Christopher Bulis
- Birthright by Nigel Robinson
- Blood Heat by Jim Mortimore
- The Dimension Riders by Daniel Blythe
- The Left-Handed Hummingbird by Kate Orman
- Conundrum by Steve Lyons
- No Future by Paul Cornell
- Tragedy Day by Gareth Roberts
- Legacy by Gary Russell
- Theatre of War by Justin Richards
- All-Consuming Fire by Andy Lane
- Blood Harvest by Terrance Dicks
- Strange England by Simon Messingham
- First Frontier by David A McIntee
- St Anthony's Fire by Mark Gatiss
- Falls the Shadow by Daniel O'Mahony
- Parasite by Jim Mortimore
- Warlock by Andrew Cartmel
- Set Piece by Kate Orman
- Infinite Requiem by Daniel Blythe
- Sanctuary by David A McIntee
- Human Nature by Paul Cornell
- Original Sin by Andy Lane
- Sky Pirates! by Dave Stone
- Zamper by Gareth Roberts
- Toy Soldiers by Paul Leonard
- Head Games by Steve Lyons
- The Also People by Ben Aaronovitch
- Shakedown by Terrance Dicks
- Just War by Lance Parkin
- Warchild by Andrew Cartmel
- Sleepy by Kate Orman
- Death and Diplomacy by Dave Stone
- Happy Endings by Paul Cornell
- Return of the Living Dad by Kate Orman
- Eternity Weeps by Jim Mortimore
- The Dying Days by Lance Parkin

=== The New Adventures ===
- Oh No It Isn't! by Paul Cornell
- Dragons' Wrath by Justin Richards
- Beyond the Sun by Matt Jones
- Ship of Fools by Dave Stone
- Down by Lawrence Miles
- Deadfall by Gary Russell
- Ghost Devices by Simon Bucher-Jones
- Mean Streets by Terrance Dicks
- Tempest by Christopher Bulis
- Walking to Babylon by Kate Orman
- Oblivion by Dave Stone
- The Medusa Effect by Justin Richards
- Dry Pilgrimage by Paul Leonard and Nick Walters
- The Sword of Forever by Jim Mortimore
- Another Girl, Another Planet by Martin Day and Len Beech
- Beige Planet Mars by Lance Parkin and Mark Clapham
- Where Angels Fear by Rebecca Levene and Simon Winstone
- The Mary-Sue Extrusion by Dave Stone
- Dead Romance by Lawrence Miles (Bernice Summerfield does not appear)
- Tears of the Oracle by Justin Richards
- Return to the Fractured Planet by Dave Stone
- The Joy Device by Justin Richards
- Twilight of the Gods by Mark Clapham and Jon de Burgh Miller

=== Big Finish paperback novels ===
- The Doomsday Manuscript by Justin Richards
- The Gods of the Underworld by Stephen Cole
- The Squire's Crystal by Jacqueline Rayner
- The Infernal Nexus by Dave Stone
- The Glass Prison by Jacqueline Rayner

=== Big Finish hardcover novels ===
- The Big Hunt by Lance Parkin
- The Tree of Life by Mark Michalowski
- Genius Loci by Ben Aaronovitch
- The Two Jasons by Dave Stone
- Terra Incognita by Ben Aaronovitch — originally announced in 2007, this novel remains unpublished save for an extract in Missing Adventures
- The Weather on Versimmon by Matthew Griffiths
- The Slender-Fingered Cats of Bubastis by Xanna Eve Chown
- Filthy Lucre by James Parsons and Andrew Stirling-Brown
- Adorable Illusion by Gary Russell

=== Big Finish novellas ===
Each volume comprises a collection of three novellas.

- A Life in Pieces by Dave Stone, Paul Sutton and Joseph Lidster
- Parallel Lives by Rebecca Levene, Stewart Sheargold and Dave Stone, with linking material by Simon Guerrier
- Old Friends by Jonathan Clements, Marc Platt and Pete Kempshall
- Nobody's Children by Kate Orman, Jonathan Blum and Philip Purser-Hallard
- The Vampire Curse by Mags L Halliday, Kelly Hale and Philip Purser-Hallard

=== Big Finish anthologies ===
- The Dead Men Diaries, edited by Paul Cornell
- A Life of Surprises, edited by Paul Cornell
- Life During Wartime, edited by Paul Cornell
- A Life Worth Living, edited by Simon Guerrier
- Something Changed, edited by Simon Guerrier
- Collected Works, edited by Nick Wallace
- Missing Adventures, edited by Rebecca Levene
- Secret Histories, edited by Mark Clapham
- Present Danger, edited by Eddie Robson
- True Stories (2017), edited by Xanna Eve Chown
- In Time (2018), edited by Xanna Eve Chown
- The Christmas Collection (2020), edited by Xanna Eve Chown

=== Short Trips ===
Bernice also appears in a number of Doctor Who short stories, mostly set during her travels with the Doctor.

- "The Trials of Tara" by Paul Cornell (Decalog 2: Lost Property)
- "Continuity Errors" by Steven Moffat (Decalog 3: Consequences)
- "The Judgement of Solomon" by Lawrence Miles (Decalog 5: Wonders)
- "Virgin Lands" by Sarah Groenewegen (Short Trips: Zodiac)
- "Of the Mermaid and Jupiter" by Ian Mond & Danny Heap (Short Trips: Past Tense)
- "Cold War" by Rebecca Levene (Short Trips: Steel Skies)
- "...Be Forgot" by Cavan Scott and Mark Wright (Short Trips: A Christmas Treasury) – set during Big Finish's Bernice audio series
- "Too Rich for My Blood" by Rebecca Levene (Short Trips: Seven Deadly Sins)
- "How You Get There" by Simon Guerrier (Short Trips: A Day in the Life)
- "Larkspur" by Mark Stevens (Short Trips: Transmissions)

=== New Series Adventures ===
Bernice appears in one of the New Series Adventures with the Twelfth Doctor (the novel was originally planned for River Song, but plans for the 2015 Christmas special The Husbands of River Song prompted Russell to use Benny instead).

- Big Bang Generation by Gary Russell

== Audio plays ==
=== Cast and characters ===
List indicator

This section includes characters who will appear or have appeared in at least one season.

- A green cell indicates the actor is a main cast member.
- A red cell indicates the actor is a recurring cast member.
- A light blue cell indicates the actor is a guest or special guest cast member.

Actor	Character	Appearances																						
Actor	Character	Bernice Summerfield											Boxsets						The New Adventures					
Actor	Character	S1	S2	S3	S4	S5	S6	S7	S8	S9	S10	S11	1	2	3	4	5	6	S1	S2	S3	S4	S5	S6
Lisa Bowerman	Bernice Summerfield	✓	✓	✓	✓	✓	✓	✓	✓	✓	✓	✓	✓	✓	✓	✓	✓	✓	✓	✓	✓	✓	✓	✓
Stephen Fewell	Jason Kane	✓		✓	✓	✓	✓	✓	✓									✓						
Miles Richardson	Irving Braxiatel		✓	✓	✓		✓	✓	✓		✓	✓	✓	✓	✓	✓	✓	✓						
Harry Myers	Adrian Wall		✓	✓	✓	✓		✓	✓		✓	✓												
Stephen Wickham	Joseph			✓	✓	✓	✓	✓	✓			✓												
Louise Faulkner	Bev Tarrant				✓			✓	✓		✓	✓												
Thomas Grant	Peter Summerfield						✓		✓	✓	✓	✓		✓	✓	✓	✓							
Ayesha Antoine	Ruth Leonidas												✓	✓	✓	✓	✓	✓						
David Ames	Jack McSpringheel												✓	✓	✓	✓	✓							
Sylvester McCoy	The Doctor								✓										✓	✓				
David Warner	The Doctor																	✓			✓	✓	✓	✓
Sophie Aldred	Ace																		✓	✓				
Mark Gatiss	The Master																				✓	✓		

=== Bernice Summerfield ===
==== Season 1 (1998–2000) ====
The first season of Bernice Summerfield audio plays are all adaptations of New Adventures novels originally published by Virgin Publishing. Each of the plays spans two CDs, except for Dragon's Wrath, which was issued on a single CD.

The plays deviate from the original novels, in terms of plot and characters, to varying degrees. This is particularly evident with the productions of Birthright and Just War, both of which were originally Doctor Who novels. These changes were necessary because, at the time of their production, Big Finish Productions weren't licensed to produce Doctor Who audio plays.

Actor and photographer Lisa Bowerman was cast in the role of Bernice Summerfield. Bowerman had previously appeared in the Doctor Who story Survival (1989). The first series also co-starred Stephen Fewell as Jason Kane. A variety of actors familiar to Doctor Who fans played guest roles in many of the plays, including Colin Baker, Sophie Aldred, Nicholas Courtney, Elisabeth Sladen, Anneke Wills and Richard Franklin.

No.	Title	Directed by	Written by	Featuring	Released
1	"Oh No It Isn't!"	Nicholas Briggs	Paul Cornell	Wolsey, Grel	September 1998
Bernice Summerfield's investigation into the lost civilisation of Perfection takes a turn for the strange when her cat Wolsey turns into the pantomime character Puss in Boots.
2	"Beyond the Sun"	Gary Russell	Matt Jones	Jason Kane	September 1998
Bernice Summerfield takes her two students Emile and Tameka on a field trip, but when her ex-husband Jason turns up, they all become embroiled with the dangerous super-weapon of a lost civilisation.
3	"Walking to Babylon"	Gary Russell	Kate Orman	Jason Kane, John Lafayette	November 1998
Bernice Summerfield travels back in time to ancient Babylon to try to prevent the powerful race known only as the People from destroying the city with a singularity bomb.
4	"Birthright"	Nicholas Briggs	Nigel Robinson	Jason Kane, John Lafayette	February 1999
After the TARDIS malfunctions and then explodes, the Doctor's companions find themselves in two different time zones.
5	"Just War"	Nicholas Briggs	Lance Parkin	Jason Kane	August 1999
The Doctor and his companions land in German-occupied Guernsey in 1941 where the Nazis are pursuing a top-secret weapon which could change the course of the war.
6	"Dragons' Wrath"	Edward Salt	Justin Richards	–	September 2000
Bernice meets the Time Lord Irving Braxiatel and soon becomes involved in the hunt for a jewel thief who is after a rare artefact.

==== Season 2 (2000–01) ====
For the second season of Bernice Summerfield audio plays, Big Finish Productions experimented by developing ongoing character arcs that alternated between two different mediums—the audio plays and novels. Fans who did not collect the novels were initially confused to discover that Benny was pregnant during the final audio play of the season, The Skymines of Karthos. The pregnancy was explained in the novel The Squire's Crystal by Jacqueline Rayner.

The run of plays from the second season onwards take part in what has become known as the Collection continuity, as they are set primarily on the Braxiatel Collection, a combined museum and university located on the planetoid KS-159. A number of regular characters are introduced, most notably Irving Braxiatel. First referenced in the 1979 Doctor Who story City of Death (written by Douglas Adams and Graham Williams), Braxiatel first appeared in person in the New Adventures novel Theatre of War.

No.	Title	Directed by	Written by	Featuring	Released
1	"The Secret of Cassandra"	Gary Russell	David Bailey	–	December 2000
On the Earth colony Chosan, Bernice finds herself caught up in war between two nations. Close to death, she is rescued by the captain of the Cassandra only to find herself in even more danger.
2	"The Stone's Lament"	Ed Salt	Mike Tucker	Adrian	May 2001
Reclusive billionaire, Bratheen Traloor, has invited Bernice to examine a mysterious artefact but is there another reason for his interest in the archaeologist?
3	"The Extinction Event"	Gary Russell	Lance Parkin	Brax	July 2001
Only one object survived the destruction of the planet Halstead - a harp. Bernice visits an auction house to buy the Halstead Harp but finds that someone else also has an interest in it - and they're willing to kill...
4	"The Skymines of Karthos"	Ed Salt	David Bailey	Brax	September 2001
Caitlin Peters, a friend of Bernice's, disappears on the mining colony of Karthos. When Bernice visits the planet, she finds herself under attack from a race of vicious alien creatures.

==== Season 3 (2002–03) ====
Whereas the previous seasons had focused primarily on the character of Bernice Summerfield, Big Finish used the third season as an opportunity to introduce an ensemble feel to the productions. This is most evident in The Green-Eyed Monsters and The Mirror Effect where the characters Jason Kane, Adrian Wall and Irving Braxiatel are significantly developed. The latter, in particular, suggests that Braxiatel has a darker, more mysterious past than the audience has previously been led to believe.

The other two plays that comprise the third season focus more specifically on Bernice. The Greatest Shop in the Galaxy remains the most light-hearted play of the season, while The Dance of the Dead reintroduces the Ice Warriors from Doctor Who.

While not officially part of the third season (at least as far as the numbering is concerned), the Bernice Summerfield audio play The Plague Herds of Excelis (the fourth play in Big Finish's Excelis series; the first three plays fall under the Doctor Who umbrella) takes place between The Green-Eyed Monsters and The Dance of the Dead. Chronologically, the short story anthology A Life of Surprises also falls within this gap.

No.	Title	Directed by	Written by	Featuring	Released
1	"The Greatest Shop in the Galaxy"	Alistair Lock	Paul Ebbs	Joseph	February 2002
Bernice visits the Gigamarket to buy shoes but, typically for her, ends up facing time anomalies and rampaging monsters.
2	"The Green-Eyed Monsters"	Gary Russell	Dave Stone	Jason, Adrian, Peter	June 2002
Bernice gets caught up in the machinations of psychotic Lady Ashantra du Lac as Jason and Adrian try to babysit Peter.
–	"The Plague Herds of Excelis"	John Ainsworth	Stephen Cole	Iris Wildthyme	July 2002
Bernice Summerfield travels to the ruined world of Artaris where she meets a mysterious traveller in time and space known only as … Iris Wildthyme.
3	"The Dance of the Dead"	Edward Salt	Stephen Cole	Ice Warriors	October 2002
Bernice finds herself hungover on a space cruiser. Suddenly, explosions rock the ship and she has to join forces with Ice Warriors and a bored steward in order to survive.
4	"The Mirror Effect"	Gary Russell	Stewart Sheargold	Brax, Jason, Adrian, Joseph	March 2003
Inside the derelict remains of an old mining station, there's a mirror. And inside the mirror, trapped with distorted versions of her friends, is Bernice Summerfield.

==== Season 4 (2003–04) ====
The fourth season was unofficially dubbed the "classic Who monsters" season, with each play featuring an alien adversary that previously appeared in the Doctor Who television series. The Bellotron Incident predominantly features the Rutan Host (their major enemies, the Sontarans, are also referred to but don't actually appear), The Draconian Rage features the Draconians, The Poison Seas casts a more sympathetic light on the Sea Devils, while Death and the Daleks (the first double CD release in the series since Just War) sees the first appearance of the Daleks within the Bernice Summerfield series. Prior to its release, Death and the Daleks was entitled The Axis of Evil to keep the appearance of the Daleks a secret.

Big Finish also published an anthology of short stories, entitled Life During Wartime, that was specially written as a prelude to the Death and the Daleks audio play. Paul Cornell, the anthology's editor, described Life During Wartime as "a novel written by multiple authors". Each of the collection's stories are told in chronological order, detailing events that occur when the Collection is occupied by a powerful alien force. The anthology ends on a cliff-hanger that is resolved in Death and the Daleks.

No.	Title	Directed by	Written by	Featuring	Released
1	"The Bellotron Incident"	Gary Russell	Mike Tucker	Bev, Brax, Joseph, Rutans	April 2003
On the primitive planet of Bellotron, Bernice finds herself caught up in the Sontaran/Rutan conflict.
2	"The Draconian Rage"	Edward Salt	Trevor Baxendale	Brax, Draconians	August 2003
Bernice has been invited to the heart of the Draconian Empire to investigate why twenty million of their race have committed suicide as part of an ancient ritual. Soon, she discovers that the event is related to something that happened in her past.
3	"The Poison Seas"	Edward Salt	David Bailey	Brax, Sea Devils	September 2003
Bernice returns to the planet Chosan to help a Sea Devil colony who are under threat from terrorists. She soon realises that the colony, and the entire planet, is actually in danger from something far worse.
4	"Death and the Daleks"	Gary Russell	Paul Cornell	Brax, Jason, Adrian, Joseph, Bev, Isaac, Fifth Axis, Daleks	January 2004
The Braxiatel Collection has been occupied by the Fifth Axis. Shortly after the events depicted in Life During Wartime Bernice discovered that the Axis was actually being controlled by the Daleks. She must return to the planet Heaven to rescue her father and overthrow the Daleks.

==== Season 5 (2004–05) ====
The previous season's tradition of using classic monsters continues into the fifth season, with the Grel (previously heard in Oh No It Isn't!) returning in The Grel Escape, a knowing pastiche of The Chase. The Bone of Contention features the Galyari, who appeared in the Doctor Who audio play The Sandman, while the title and plot of The Relics of Jegg-Sau was inspired by a 1970s Doctor Who licensed jigsaw puzzle that depicted a scene with giant robots identical to the one that appeared in Robot.

The Masquerade of Death brings the fifth season to a close in a dark and surreal fashion.

No.	Title	Directed by	Written by	Featuring	Released
1	"The Grel Escape"	Gary Russell	Jacqueline Rayner	Jason, Peter, Joseph, The Grel	July 2004
The fact-obsessed Grel chase Peter throughout time and space after he manages to use Bernice and Jason's Time Rings.
2	"The Bone of Contention"	Edward Salt	Simon A. Forward	The Galyari	August 2004
Bernice visits the home of the Galyari to recover an artefact for the Perloran government. The job is complicated when a young Galyari latches onto her.
3	"The Relics of Jegg-Sau"	Edward Salt	Stephen Cole	K1	November 2004
Bernice visits the failed colony of Jegg-Sau in search of long-lost treasure. But the planet isn't as lifeless as everyone believes...
4	"The Masquerade of Death"	John Ainsworth	Stewart Sheargold	Adrian	March 2005
Bernice and Adrian find themselves trapped in a theatrical world where nobody is who they seem to be.

==== Season 6 (2005–06) ====
By the end of The Crystal of Cantus, the true dark and manipulative nature of Braxiatel was revealed and he left the Collection. Its future is now uncertain, with the Draconians claiming they own the planetoid on what it is based. The entire series was directed by Gary Russell.

No.	Title	Directed by	Written by	Featuring	Released
1	"The Heart's Desire"	Gary Russell	David Bailey & Neil Corry	Eternals	June 2005
Bernice visits Marlowe's World to try and stop a pulsar that threatens to destroy the Braxiatel Collection. There she meets some ancient beings who can grant her every wish.
2	"The Kingdom of the Blind"	Gary Russell	Jacqueline Rayner	Jason, Monoids	July 2005
While asleep, Bernice hears a voice in her head which leads her to a strange planet where a race of one-eyed monsters keep a slave race subdued by mutilating them.
3	"The Lost Museum"	Gary Russell	Simon Guerrier	Jason	September 2005
4	"The Goddess Quandary"	Gary Russell	Andy Russell	Keri	February 2006
Bernice visits the unstable planet Etheria to help a group of monks verify their claim to have found the last resting place of a mighty warlord. Soon she finds herself under threat from both the planet, its inhabitants and even from an old friend.
5	"The Crystal of Cantus"	Gary Russell	Joseph Lidster	Brax, Jason, Joseph, Peter	June 2006
Bernice, Jason and Irving Braxiatel visit the planet of Cantus to locate its fabled Crystal. There, they unearth what seems to be a tomb of Cybermen. When even that isn't what it first appears to be, Bernice discovers that she can no longer trust one of her oldest friends.

==== Season 7 (2006) ====
The seventh season follows the staff of the Collection as they attempt to keep things running smoothly in Braxiatel's absence. Collected Works and Old Friends, two books published during this season's run, also develop the running plots that planetoid KS-159 is under threat from the Draconians and Mim, and that the Collection itself is falling apart literally as well as figuratively without Braxiatel at its helm.

No.	Title	Directed by	Written by	Featuring	Released
1	"The Tartarus Gate"	Gary Russell	Stewart Sheargold	Jason, Joseph	July 2006
Bernice has been removed from time and space and even though the Collection has problems of its own, Jason is doing his best to find her. He receives information that she is on the planet Cerebus Iera, a world that is said to be linked to the gateway to Hell.
2	"Timeless Passages"	Gary Russell	Daniel O'Mahony	–	August 2006
For years the great Labyrinth of Kerykeion has been home to one of the largest libraries of human incunabula in the galaxy. Here, otherwise lost volumes are all carefully preserved. From tomorrow, it is under new management. Professor Bernice Summerfield is sent to acquire some of the rarest books for the Braxiatel Collection before the new corporate owners bulldoze their way in. She is hoping for a quiet time searching the archives. Some chance. Soon she is investigating a horrible murder and is caught up in a last-ditch scheme to save the entire library. There is a vicious, insane killer cyborg on Benny's heels. And then ancient subterranean powers begin to stir.
3	"The Worst Thing in the World"	Ed Salt	Dave Stone	Jason	September 2006
The Drome was set ↵Now Benny finds herself in a desperate fight for her life. A fight so desperate that she will be forced to do something she has never done before, a horror that she never imagined she could bring herself to commit. The worst thing in the world.
4	"Summer of Love"	Ed Salt	Simon Guerrier	Jason, Bev, Adrian, Doggles, Joseph, Hass	October 2006
It's the hottest summer the Braxiatel Collection has ever seen, and as neighbouring aliens try to take advantage of the weakened state of affairs, the inhabitants find themselves with only one thing on their mind - sex.
5	"The Oracle of Delphi"	Ed Salt	Scott Handcock	Jason	November 2006
Arriving in Athens in 430BCE, Bernice and Jason soon find themselves encountering a mysterious cult, the war with the Spartans, a threat to all of time and a man called Socrates.
6	"The Empire State"	Ed Salt	Eddie Robson	Jason, Maggie, Brax	December 2006

==== Season 8 (2007–08) ====
In the eighth season, Braxiatel returns to the Collection, which is threatened by crossfire and politics in the war between the Draconians and Mim. The war comes to an unexpected conclusion shortly after his return, and several regular characters pay a heavy price for realising too late that Braxiatel himself is the real threat. The season ends with Benny cutting her ties to the Collection and Braxiatel, and going on the run with her son Peter. The books The Two Jasons and Nobody's Children also fit into this season's arc.

No.	Title	Directed by	Written by	Featuring	Released
1	"The Tub Full of Cats"	Ed Salt	Daniel O'Mahony	Maggie, Brax, the Mim	February 2007
As the Braxiatel Collection faces destruction, Bernice returns with its founder, Irving Braxiatel... on a ship piloted by a crew of cats.
2	"The Judas Gift"	Ed Salt	Nick Wallace	Bev, Adrian, Brax, Doggles, Joseph, Hass, the Mim, Draconians	April 2007
he Collection is caught up in the war between the Draconians and the Mim. As Bev tries to ensure they stay neutral, it becomes apparent that the Draconian Ambassador may have other motives for seeing her...
3	"Freedom of Information"	Ed Salt	Eddie Robson	Adrian, Brax, Doggles, Joseph, Hass, Jason, the Mim, Draconians	June 2007
4	"The End of the World"	Lisa Bowerman	Dave Stone	Jason, Brax, Adrian	September 2007
Jason Kane is on a quest to finally discover the truth about Irving Braxiatel. What he discovers will change the lives of everyone around him forever.
5	"The Final Amendment"	Gary Russell	Joseph Lidster	Kadiatu	October 2007
Benny meets up with an old friend...
6	"The Wake"	Gary Russell	Simon Guerrier	Peter, Brax, Adrian, Bev, Doggles, Joseph, Hass	January 2008
Benny looks back on her life, following the devastating events of The End of the World

==== Season 9 (2008) ====
The ninth season is a much looser collection of stories, following Bernice and her son Peter as Benny searches for work away from the Collection.

No.	Title	Directed by	Written by	Featuring	Released
1	"Beyond the Sea"	Toby Longworth	Eddie Robson	Peter	June 2008
2	"The Adolescence of Time"	Lisa Bowerman	Lawrence Miles	Peter	July 2008
Bernice and Peter find themselves on Earth... after events have started to lead to the extinction of the dinosaurs.
3	"The Adventure of the Diogenes Damsel"	Nigel Fairs	Jim Smith	Mycroft, Straxus, Cwejen	August 2008
Bernice finds herself marooned in Victorian London where she seeks the help of Mycroft Holmes.
4	"The Diet of Worms"	Toby Longworth	Matthew Sweet	Peter	September 2008
Bernice applies for a job at the Depository - a place where all the great literary achievements of the human race are stored.

==== Season 10 (2009) ====
The entire series was directed by John Ainsworth.

No.	Title	Directed by	Written by	Featuring	Released
1	"Glory Days"	John Ainsworth	Nick Wallace	Peter, Bev, Adrian, Brax	June 2009
2	"Absence"	John Ainsworth	Daniel O'Mahony	Peter	July 2009
3	"Venus Mantrap"	John Ainsworth	Mark Clapham & Lance Parkin	Adrian, Peter	August 2009
Bernice travels to Venus to obtain the secret publishing royalties of her deceased husband Jason Kane and becomes embroiled in the politics of Venus' twin artificial moons, Eros and Thanatos.
4	"Secret Origins"	John Ainsworth	Eddie Robson	Peter, Robyn, Brax	September 2009
Bernice's son, Peter, is kidnapped by the seemingly immortal Mr. Frost. Bernice travels to the ruined city of Buenos Aires to rescue Peter.

==== Season 11 (2010) ====
The entire series was again directed by John Ainsworth. The animated short Dead and Buried, released online for free, acted as a prelude to this series.

No.	Title	Directed by	Written by	Featuring	Released
1	"Resurrecting the Past"	John Ainsworth	Eddie Robson	Peter, Brax, Bev, Adrian, Robyn, Doggles, Joseph, Hass	September 2010
Braxiatel's plans seem to be coming to fruition. As Adrian and Peter search for a missing Bernice, Robyn and Bev must investigate to find why Benny has been so important to Braxiatel for so long...
2	"Escaping the Future"	John Ainsworth	Eddie Robson	Peter, Brax, Bev, Adrian, Doggles, Joseph, Hass	October 2010
The galaxy is in turmoil. As Bernice's friends fight to keep the Deindum at bay, can Bernice and Peter find out who they are, and how to stop them?
3	"Year Zero"	John Ainsworth	Jonathan Clements	–	November 2010
Bernice is trapped on a planet where archeology is illegal. To return home she must break the law to find out what happened in Year Zero.
4	"Dead Man's Switch"	John Ainsworth	John Dorney & Richard Dinnick	–	December 2010
Benny continues to fight to get home, but what is so important about the world of Zordin? What is trying to escape from there?

==== Boxset 1: Epoch (2011) ====
No.	Title	Directed by	Written by	Featuring	Released
1	"The Kraken's Lament"	Gary Russell	Mark Wright	Acanthus, Jack	September 2011
2	"The Temple of Questions"	Gary Russell	Jacqueline Rayner	Ruth, Leonidas, Jack, Heskith	September 2011
3	"Private Enemy No. 1"	Gary Russell	Tony Lee	Ruth, Leonidas, Heskith, the Epoch	September 2011
4	"Judgement Day"	Gary Russell	Scott Handcock	Ruth, Jack, the Epoch, Brax	September 2011

==== Boxset 2: Road Trip (2012) ====
No.	Title	Directed by	Written by	Featuring	Released
1	"Brand Management"	Gary Russell	Christopher Cooper	Ruth	February 2012
2	"Bad Habits"	Gary Russell	Simon Barnard and Paul Morris	Ruth	February 2012
3	"Paradise Frost"	Scott Handcock	David Llewellyn	Ruth, Brax, Peter, Jack	February 2012

==== Boxset 3: Legion (2012) ====
No.	Title	Directed by	Written by	Featuring	Released
1	"Vesuvius Falling"	Gary Russell	Tony Lee	Peter, Ruth, Jack, Brax	September 2012
2	"Shades of Gray"	Scott Handcock	Scott Handcock	Ruth, Jack, Dorian	September 2012
3	"Everybody Loves Irving"	Gary Russell	Miles Richardson	Brax, Peter, Ruth, Jack	September 2012

==== Boxset 4: New Frontiers (2013) ====
No.	Title	Directed by	Written by	Featuring	Released
1	"A Handful of Dust"	Gary Russell	Xanna Eve Chown	Peter, Ruth, Jack	April 2013
2	"HMS Surprise"	Scott Handcock	Alexander Vlahos	Peter, Jack	April 2013
3	"The Curse of Fenman"	Gary Russell	Gary Russell	Peter, Ruth, Jack, Brax, Fenman	April 2013

==== Boxset 5: Missing Persons (2013) ====
No.	Title	Directed by	Written by	Featuring	Released
1	"Big Dig"	Gary Russell and Scott Handcock	Hamish Steele	Ruth, Jack, The Epoch	December 2013
2	"The Revenant's Carnival"	Gary Russell and Scott Handcock	Martin Day	Peter	December 2013
3	"The Brimstone Kid"	Gary Russell and Scott Handcock	David Llewellyn	Brax	December 2013
4	"The Winning Side"	Gary Russell and Scott Handcock	James Goss	The Epoch	December 2013
5	"In Living Memory"	Gary Russell and Scott Handcock	Gary Russell and Scott Handcock	Peter, Ruth, Jack, Brax, The Epoch	December 2013

==== Boxset 6: The Story So Far (2018) ====
No.	Title	Directed by	Written by	Featuring	Released
Volume 1
1	"Ever After Happy"	Scott Handcock	James Goss	–	September 2018
2	"The Grel Invasion of Earth"	Scott Handcock	Jacqueline Rayner	Jason Kane, The Grel	September 2018
3	"Braxiatel in Love"	Scott Handcock	Simon Guerrier	Brax	September 2018
Volume 2
1	"Every Dark Thought"	Scott Handcock	Eddie Robson	Valeyard	September 2018
2	"Empress of the Drahvins"	Scott Handcock	David Llewellyn	Drahvins, Ruth	September 2018
3	"The Angel of History"	Scott Handcock	Una McCormack	The Doctor (Unbound)	September 2018

==== Specials ====
Title	Directed by	Written by	Featuring	Released
Buried Treasures	Jason Haigh-Ellery, Gary Russell	Jacqueline Rayner, Paul Cornell	Keri	August 1999
"Silver Lining"	Gary Russell	Colin Brake	Cybermen	December 2004
"Many Happy Returns"	John Ainsworth, Scott Handcock, Gary Russell	Xanna Eve Chown, Stephen Cole, Paul Cornell, Stephen Fewell, Simon Guerrier, Scott Handcock, Rebecca Levene, Jacqueline Rayner, Justin Richards, Miles Richardson, Eddie Robson, Dave Stone	Joseph, Brax, Adrian, Bev, Peter, Ruth, Jack, Leonidas, Iris, Panda, Seventh Doctor	November 2012

=== The New Adventures of Bernice Summerfield ===
Following the conclusion of the Bernice Summerfield box set range, a new range starring Lisa Bowerman as Bernice Summerfield alongside Sylvester McCoy as the Doctor entitled The New Adventures of Bernice Summerfield was launched.

==== Volume 1 (2014) ====
No.	Title	Directed by	Written by	Featuring	Released
1	"The Revolution"	Scott Handcock	Nev Fountain	Seventh Doctor	June 2014
2	"Good Night, Sweet Ladies"	Scott Handcock	Una McCormack	–	June 2014
3	"Random Ghosts"	Scott Handcock	Guy Adams	Ace	June 2014
4	"The Lights of Skaro"	Scott Handcock	James Goss	Seventh Doctor, Ace	June 2014

==== Volume 2: The Triumph of Sutekh (2015) ====
No.	Title	Directed by	Written by	Featuring	Released
1	"The Pyramid of Sutekh"	Scott Handcock	Guy Adams	Seventh Doctor, Ace	June 2015
2	"The Vaults of Osiris"	Scott Handcock	Justin Richards	Seventh Doctor, Ace	June 2015
3	"The Eye of Horus"	Scott Handcock	James Goss	Seventh Doctor, Ace	June 2015
4	"The Tears of Isis"	Scott Handcock	Una McCormack	Seventh Doctor, Ace	June 2015

==== Volume 3: The Unbound Universe (2016) ====
Bernice Summerfield in a series of adventures with a version of the Doctor from the Unbound series, played by David Warner. Mark Gatiss returns as a version of the Master from the same series, appearing in The Emporium at the End and The True Savior of the Universe, as well as a brief appearance in a flashback in The Library in the Body.

No.	Title	Directed by	Written by	Featuring	Released
1	"The Library in the Body"	Scott Handcock	James Goss	The Doctor ( Unbound)	August 2016
2	"Planet X"	Scott Handcock	Guy Adams	The Doctor (Unbound)	August 2016
3	"The Very Dark Thing"	Scott Handcock	Una McCormack	The Doctor (Unbound)	August 2016
4	"The Emporium at the End"	Scott Handcock	Emma Reeves	The Doctor (Unbound), The Master (Unbound)	August 2016

==== Volume 4: Ruler of the Universe (2017) ====
No.	Title	Directed by	Written by	Featuring	Released
1	"The City and the Clock"	Scott Handcock	Guy Adams	The Doctor (Unbound)	September 2017
2	"Asking for a Friend"	Scott Handcock	James Goss	The Doctor (Unbound)	September 2017
3	"Truant"	Scott Handcock	Guy Adams	The Doctor (Unbound)	September 2017
4	"The True Saviour of the Universe"	Scott Handcock	James Goss	The Doctor (Unbound), The Master (Unbound)	September 2017

==== Volume 5: Buried Memories (2019) ====
No.	Title	Directed by	Written by	Featuring	Released
1	"Pride of the Lampian"	Scott Handcock	Alyson Leeds	The Doctor (Unbound)	September 2019
2	"Clear History"	Scott Handcock	Doris V Sutherland	The Doctor (Unbound)	September 2019
3	"Dead and Breakfast"	Scott Handcock	April McCaffrey	The Doctor (Unbound)	September 2019
4	"Burrowed Time"	Scott Handcock	Lani Woodward	The Doctor (Unbound)	September 2019

==== Volume 6: Lost in Translation (2020) ====
No.	Title	Directed by	Written by	Featuring	Released
1	"Have I Told You Lately?"	Scott Handcock	Tim Foley	The Doctor (Unbound)	September 2020
2	"The Undying Truth"	Scott Handcock	JA Prentice	The Doctor (Unbound)	September 2020
3	"Inertia"	Scott Handcock	James Goss	The Doctor (Unbound)	September 2020
4	"Gallifrey"	Scott Handcock	Guy Adams & AK Benedict	The Doctor (Unbound)	September 2020

==== Volume 7: Blood & Steel (2022) ====
David Warner died on 24 July 2022. Recording of the series had been completed and was released posthumously.

No.	Title	Directed by	Written by	Featuring	Released
1	"Wilkommen"	Scott Handcock	James Goss	The Doctor (Unbound), Cybermen	September 2022
2	"Wulf"	Scott Handcock	Aaron Lamont	The Doctor (Unbound)	September 2022
3	"Ubermensch"	Scott Handcock	Rochana Patel	The Doctor (Unbound)	September 2022
4	"Auf Wiedersehen"	Scott Handcock	Victoria Saxton	The Doctor (Unbound)	September 2022

==== Volume 8: The Eternity Club (2024) ====
No.	Title	Directed by	Written by	Featuring	Released
Part 1
1	"The Armageddon Chair"	David O'Mahony	James Goss	Bernice Summerfield, Secretary Pym, The Oldest, Starll	September 2024
2	"Triumph of the Drahvin"	David O'Mahony	James Goss	Bernice Summerfield, Secretary Pym, The Oldest, Starll	September 2024
Part 2
3	"Rhubarb"	David O'Mahony	Tim Foley	Bernice Summerfield, Secretary Pym, The Oldest, Starll	October 2024
4	"Please Retain Your Ticket for the Cloakroom"	David O'Mahony	Tim Foley	Bernice Summerfield, Secretary Pym, The Oldest, Starll	October 2024
Part 3
5	"The Terrible Shame of a Tree"	David O'Mahony	James Goss	Bernice Summerfield, Secretary Pym, The Oldest, Alkaran, Siras	November 2024
6	"Mr Pym has an Adventure"	David O'Mahony	James Goss	Bernice Summerfield, Secretary Pym, The Oldest, Alkaran, Siras	November 2024
Part 4
7	"Sanctuary"	David O'Mahony	Tim Foley	Bernice Summerfield, Secretary Pym, The Oldest	December 2024
8	"Liturgy of Death"	David O'Mahony	Tim Foley	Bernice Summerfield, Secretary Pym, The Oldest	December 2024

==== Volume 9: The Dalek Eternity (2025) ====
No.	Title	Directed by	Written by	Featuring	Released
Part 1
1	"The Lonely Bomb"	Scott Handcock	James Goss	Bernice Summerfield, Daleks	September 2025
2	"Satrap"	Scott Handcock	Felicia Baker	Bernice Summerfield, Daleks	September 2025
Part 2
3	"The Winner’s Tale"	Scott Handcock	Alex Hewitt	Bernice Summerfield, Daleks	October 2025
4	"Oversoul"	Scott Handcock	Melissa F. Olson	Bernice Summerfield, Daleks	October 2025
Part 3
5	"Quisling"	Scott Handcock	Sophia McDougall	Bernice Summerfield, Daleks	November 2025
6	"We Don’t Talk About Mavic Chen"	Scott Handcock	Tim Foley	Bernice Summerfield, Daleks	November 2025
Part 4
7	"Vizier"	Scott Handcock	Patrick O'Connor	Bernice Summerfield, Daleks	December 2025
8	"Emperor"	Scott Handcock	Ash Darby	Bernice Summerfield, Daleks	December 2025

=== Other audio play appearances ===
- "The Shadow of the Scourge"
- "The Dark Flame"
- The Company of Friends: "Benny's Story"
- "Bernice Summerfield and the Criminal Code"
- "Love and War"
- "The Highest Science"
- "Theatre of War"
- "All-Consuming Fire"
- "Original Sin"
- "Short Trips: The Hesitation Deviation"
- "The Worlds of Big Finish: The Phantom Wreck"
- "The Eighth of March: The Big Blue Book"

== See also ==
- Doctor Who spin-offs
