= Steve Bowkett =

English writer and hypnotherapist

Steve Bowkett is a writer and hypnotherapist. Born and raised in South Wales he moved to Leicestershire with his family in the Sixties. He writes children's fiction and poetry and wrote three adult horror novels under the pseudonym of Ben Leech. He has also published a number of educational books in the areas of creativity, thinking skills, creative writing, emotional resourcefulness and spirituality. To date Steve has published over fifty-five titles plus numerous short stories and poems.

Steve is also the Editor of The National Association of Writers' Group's Link Magazine.
