= Simon Guerrier =

British science fiction author and dramatist

- Education: University of Reading
- Occupations: Short story writer, novelist, editor
- Writing career
- Period: 2002 – present
- Genre: Science fiction
- Website: 0tralala.blogspot.com

Simon Guerrier (born June 1976) is a British science fiction author and dramatist, closely associated with the fictional universe of Doctor Who and its spinoffs. Although he has written three Doctor Who novels, for the BBC Books range, his work has mostly been for Big Finish Productions' audio drama and book ranges. Guerrier has also written tie-in books for the Being Human and Primeval television series and co-authored a reference book for the Buffy the Vampire Slayer television series.

== Work ==
Guerrier's earliest published fiction appeared in Zodiac, the first of Big Finish's Short Trips range of Doctor Who short story anthologies. To date, his work has appeared in the majority of the Short Trips collections. He has also edited three volumes in the series, The History of Christmas, Time Signature and How the Doctor Changed My Life. The second of these takes as its starting-point Guerrier's short story An Overture Too Early in The Muses. The third anthology featured stories entirely by previously unpublished writers.

After contributing two stories to the anthology Life During Wartime in Big Finish's Bernice Summerfield range of books and audio dramas, Guerrier was invited to edit the subsequent year's short story collection, A Life Worth Living, and the novella collection Parallel Lives. After contributing two audio dramas to the series, Guerrier became the producer of the Bernice Summerfield range of plays and books, a post he held between January 2006 and June 2007.

His other Doctor Who work includes the audio dramas, The Settling and The Judgement of Isskar, in Big Finish's Doctor Who audio range, three Companion Chronicles and a contribution to the UNIT spinoff series. He created the spin-off Graceless, which aired on BBC Radio 4 Extra. He has also written a play in Big Finish's Sapphire and Steel range.

== Style ==
Guerrier's work is characterised by character-driven humour and by an interest in unifying the continuity of the various Big Finish ranges through multiple references and reappearances of characters. As editor he has been a strong promoter of the work of various script writers from the Seventh Doctor era of the Doctor Who television series.

== Bibliography ==
=== Doctor Who novels ===
- The Time Travellers (2005), ISBN 0-563-48633-3.
- The Pirate Loop (2007), ISBN 1-846-07347-2.
- The Slitheen Excursion (2009), ISBN 978-184607640-4.

=== Primeval novels ===
- Fire and Water (2009) (ISBN 1845766954)

=== Being Human novels ===
- The Road (2010), ISBN 9780091914172.

=== Sherlock Holmes novels ===
- The Great War (2021) ISBN 1789096944.

=== Doctor Who short stories ===
- "Libra: The Switching: in Short Trips: Zodiac (2002; edited by Jacqueline Rayner), ISBN 1-84435-006-1.
- 'Curriculum Vitae" in Short Trips: Companions, (2003; edited by Rayner), ISBN 1-84435-007-X.
- "Euterpe: An Overture Too Early" in Short Trips: The Muses, (2003; edited by Rayner), ISBN 1-84435-009-6}. Also Reprinted in Short Trips: Time Signature (2006; edited by Guerrier), ISBN 1-84435-235-8.
- "A Good Life" in Short Trips: Steel Skies (2003; edited by John Binns), ISBN 1-84435-045-2.
- "The Immortals" in Short Trips: Past Tense (2004; edited by Ian Farrington), ISBN 1-84435-046-0.
- "Categorical Imperative" in Short Trips: Monsters (2004; edited by Farrington), ISBN 1-84435-110-6.
- "Last Christmas" in Short Trips: A Christmas Treasury (2004; edited by Paul Cornell), ISBN 1-84435-112-2.
- "How You Get There" in Short Trips: A Day in the Life (2005; edited by Farrington), ISBN 1-84435-147-5.
- "Christmas on the Moon" in Short Trips: The History of Christmas (2005; edited by Guerrier), ISBN 1-84435-149-1.
- "Incongruous Details" in Short Trips: The Centenarian (2006; edited by Farrington), ISBN 1-84435-191-2.
- "DS Al Fine" in Short Trips: Time Signature (2006; edited by Guerrier), ISBN 1-84435-235-8.
- "The Best Joke I Ever Told" and "The Eighth Wonder of the World" in Short Trips: Dalek Empire (2006; edited by Nicholas Briggs), ISBN 1-84435-150-5.
- "There's Something About Mary" in Short Trips: Snapshots (2007; edited by Joseph Lidster), ISBN 1-84435-267-6.
- "Great Escapes" in Short Trips: Defining Patterns (2008; edited by Farrington), ISBN 978-1-84435-268-5.
- "Do You Smell Carrots?" in Short Trips: Christmas Around the World (2008; edited by Xanna Eve Chown), ISBN 978-1-84435-342-2.
- "Pass It On" in Short Trips: Indefinable Magic (2009; edited by Neil Corry), ISBN 978-1-84435-384-2.
- "Journey Out of Terror" in The Target Storybook (2019), ISBN 978-1785944741.

=== Doctor Who comic strips ===
- The Secret Army
- The Good Old Days

=== Bernice Summerfield short stories ===
- The Birthday Party and Speaking Out in Life During Wartime (2003; edited by Cornell), ISBN 1-84435-062-2.
- Inappropriate Laughter and After Life in Something Changed (2005; edited by Guerrier), ISBN 1-84435-153-X.
- Six Impossible Things in Present Danger (2010, edited by Eddie Robson), ISBN 978-1-84435-525-9.
- Benny and the Grieving Man in In Time (2018, edited by Xanna Eve Chown), ISBN 978-1-78703-612-3.
- Santa Benny at the Bottom of the Sea in The Christmas Collection (2020, audiobook edited by Chown), ISBN 978-1-83868-284-2.

=== As editor ===
- A Life Worth Living (2004), ISBN 1-84435-109-2.
- Short Trips: The History of Christmas (2005), ISBN 1-84435-149-1.
- Parallel Lives (2005), ISBN 1-84435-154-8.
- Something Changed (2005), ISBN 1-84435-153-X.
- Short Trips: Time Signature (2006), ISBN 1-84435-235-8.
- Old Friends (2006), ISBN 1-84435-242-0.
- Short Trips: Dalek Empire (2006), ISBN 1-84435-150-5.
- Short Trips: How the Doctor Changed My Life (2009), ISBN 978-1-84435-341-5.

=== Reference books ===
- Buffy the Vampire Slayer: Slayer Stats: The Complete Infographic Guide to All Things Buffy (2018; with Steve O'Brien), ISBN 978-1683830566.

== Audio Productions ==
=== Doctor Who audio drama ===
- The Settling (2006; featuring the Seventh Doctor, Ace and Hex)
- The Judgement of Isskar (2009; featuring the Fifth Doctor)
- The Mega (2013; featuring the Third Doctor)
- The Yes Men (2015; featuring the Second Doctor)
- The Black Hole (2015; featuring the Second Doctor)
- The Sontarans (2016; featuring the First Doctor)
- The Outliers (2017; featuring the Second Doctor)
- The Home Guard (2019; featuring the Second Doctor)
- The Bookshop at the End of the World (part of Shadow of the Daleks 1) (2020; featuring the Fifth Doctor)
- Wicked Sisters (2020; featuring the Fifth Doctor)

=== Doctor Who audio novels ===
- Scourge of the Cybermen (2021)

=== Doctor Who Companion Chronicles ===
- Home Truths (2008; featuring Sara Kingdom)
- The Prisoner's Dilemma (2009; featuring Ace and Zara)
- The Drowned World (2009; featuring Sara Kingdom)
- Shadow of the Past (2010; featuring Liz Shaw)
- The Guardian of the Solar System (2010; featuring Sara Kingdom)
- The Perpetual Bond (2011; featuring Steven Taylor & Oliver Harper)
- The Cold Equations (2011; featuring Steven Taylor & Oliver Harper)
- The Memory Cheats (2011; featuring Zoe Heriot)
- The First Wave (2011; featuring Steven Taylor & Oliver Harper)
- The Anachronauts (2012; featuring Steven Taylor & Sara Kingdom)
- The Uncertainty Principle (2012; featuring Zoe Heriot)
- The Library of Alexandria (2013; featuring Ian Chesterton)
- The War to End All Wars (2014; featuring Steven Taylor)
- The Founding Fathers and The Locked Room (2015; featuring Steven Taylor)
- The Heartless Sea (2026; featuring Harry Sullivan)

=== Doctor Who Short Trips ===
- Letting Go (2011)
- The Switching (2017)
- Lesser Evils (2020)

=== Bernice Summerfield audio dramas ===
- The Lost Museum (2005)
- Summer of Love (2006)
- The Wake (2007)
- Braxiatel in Love (2018)

=== Blake's 7 audio drama ===
- The Dust Run and The Trial (2009)
- The Turing Test (2012)
- The Magnificent Four (2012)
- Logic (2013)
- Spy (2014)
- President (2014)
- Remnants (2015)
- No Name (2022)

=== Other Big Finish audio dramas ===
- UNIT: The Coup (2004)
- Sapphire and Steel: The School (2006)
- Iris Wildthyme: The Two Irises (2009)
- Robin Hood: The Siege (2009)
- Graceless (2010–2017)
- Dark Shadows: The Creeping Fog (2011)
- Dan Dare: Reign of the Robots (2017)
- Susan's War: The Uncertain Shore (2020)
