= Nigel Robinson =

English author

Nigel Robinson is an English author, known for such works as the First Contact series. Nigel was born in Preston, Lancashire and attended St Thomas More school. Robinson's first published book was The Tolkien Quiz Book in 1981, co-written with Linda Wilson. This was followed by a series of three Doctor Who quiz books and a crossword book between 1981 and 1985. In the late 1980s he was the editor of Target Books' range of Doctor Who tie-ins and novelisations, also contributing to the range as a writer.

He later wrote an original Doctor Who novel, Timewyrm: Apocalypse, for the New Adventures series for Virgin Publishing, which had purchased Target in 1989 shortly after Robinson had left the company. He also wrote the New Adventure Birthright, published in 1993.

In the 1990s, Robinson wrote novelisations of episodes of The Tomorrow People, The Young Indiana Jones Chronicles and Baywatch and the film Free Willy. Between 1994 and 1995, he wrote a series of children's horror novels Remember Me..., All Shook Up, Dream Lover, Rave On, Bad Moon Rising, Symphony of Terror and Demon Brood. In 1996 he continued to write the Luke Cannon Show Jumping Mysteries series, containing four books, namely The Piebald Princess, The Chestnut Chase, The Black Mare of Devils Hill and the last in the series, Decision Day for the Dapple Grey. By 1997 he had also penned a trilogy science fiction novels First Contact, Second Nature and Third Degree.

His most recent work was another quiz book, this time to tie in with the film The Chronicles of Narnia: The Lion, the Witch and the Wardrobe.
