= Eddie Robson =

British writer and novelist (born 1978)

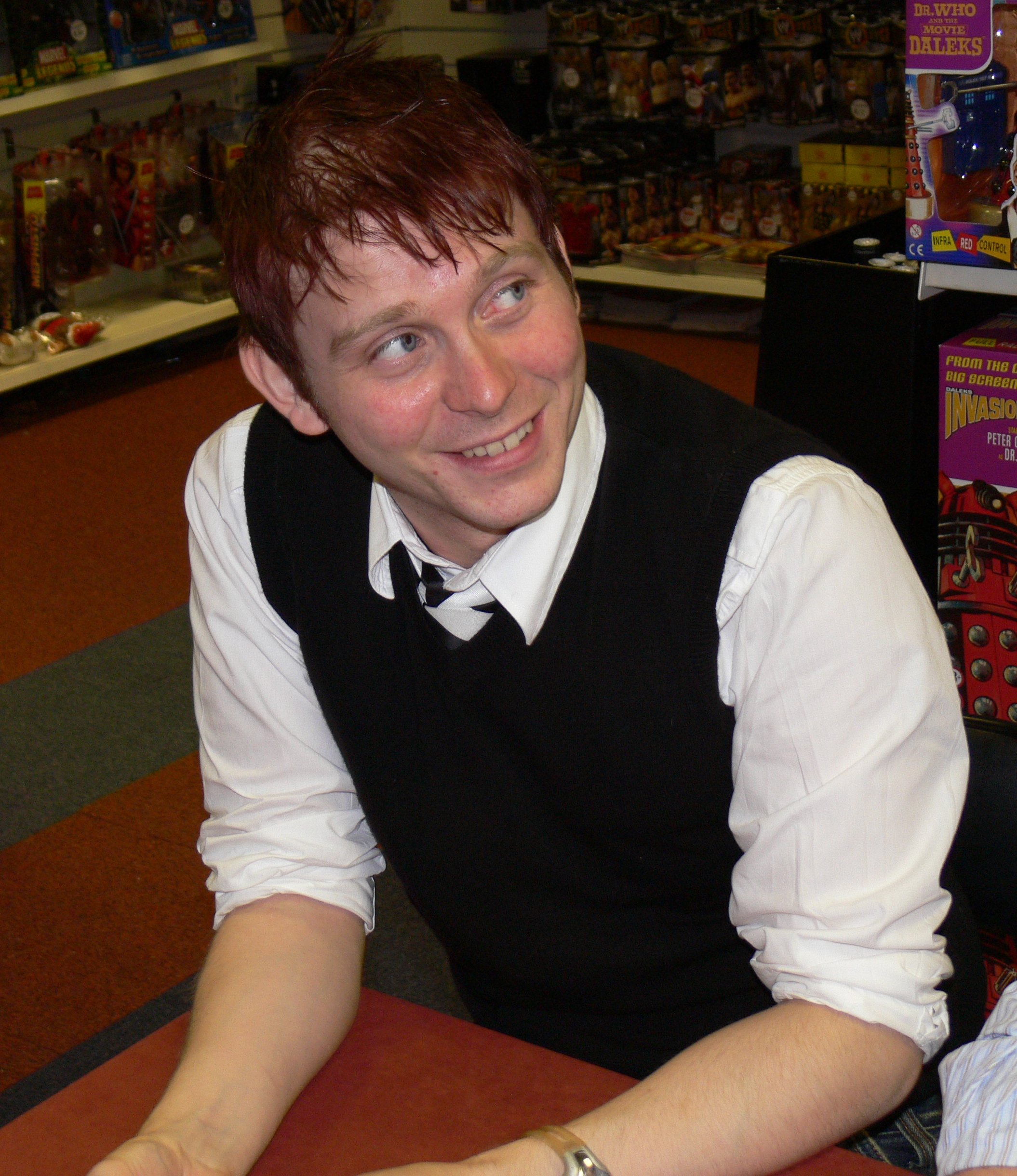
- Photo by Tim Drury.
- Born: 20 December 1978 (age 47); York, England
- Occupations: Screenwriter, novelist, playwright, journalist, comedian
- Writing career
- Period: 2000–
- Genres: Science fiction, comedy

Eddie Robson (born 20 December 1978) is a British writer, best known for his sitcom Welcome to Our Village, Please Invade Carefully and his work on a variety of spin-offs from the BBC Television series Doctor Who. He has written books, comics, short stories, and for television and theatre, and has worked as a freelance journalist for various science fiction magazines. He is married and lives in Lancaster.

== Writing career ==
Robson's comedy writing career began in 2008 with material for Look Away Now. Since then his work has featured on That Mitchell and Webb Sound, Tilt, Play and Record, Newsjack, Recorded For Training Purposes and The Headset Set. The pilot episode of his sitcom Welcome To Our Village, Please Invade Carefully was broadcast on BBC Radio 2 on 5 July 2012. It starred Katherine Parkinson and Julian Rhind-Tutt. The Radio Times called it "the sitcom success story of 2012..." It became a full series, aired on BBC Radio 2 starting in March 2013, with Hattie Morahan replacing Katherine Parkinson.

=== Doctor Who ===
His Doctor Who work includes the BBC 7 radio plays Phobos, Human Resources and Grand Theft Cosmos, the CD releases Memory Lane, The Condemned, The Raincloud Man and The Eight Truths, and several short stories for Big Finish's Doctor Who anthologies, Short Trips. He has contributed Doctor Who comic strips to Doctor Who Adventures and IDW.

Between 2007 and 2009, Robson was the producer of Big Finish's Bernice Summerfield range of products, and has contributed audio plays to the series. He has also written audio plays for other Big Finish ranges such as The Diary Of River Song, Blake's 7: The Liberator Chronicles.

=== Books, comics and theatre ===
Apart from Doctor Who, Robson has also written other comic strips including ones for 2000 AD, Transformers: Prime, Teenage Mutant Ninja Turtles, Captain America: Living Legend (with Andy Diggle).

Robson has also written books on film noir and the Coen Brothers for Virgin Publishing, the Doctor Who episode guide Who's Next with co-authors Mark Clapham and Jim Smith, and an illustrated adaptation of Bram Stoker's Dracula. He has written three children's books mixing fiction and tips for Fortnite.

Robson has worked with the Duke's Theatre on several productions including writing their 2015 Christmas show, Beauty and the Beast. In 2015, his debut novel Tomorrow Never Knows was published by Snowbooks. His second novel, Hearts of Oak, was published by Tor.com in 2020.

=== Television ===
Robson is a prolific writer of children's television, with credits including Sarah & Duck (2015–16), Class Dismissed (2016) and Tish-Tash (2021). Other television work included episodes of the long running soap Hollyoaks (2014–2015), and the Chinese version of AMC's Humans, 你好，安怡 / Nǐ hǎo, ān yí (Hello An Yi), produced by Endemol Shine China and Croton Media. The show was broadcast on Tencent Video and iQiyi on February 19, 2021.

== Bibliography ==
=== Books ===
Fiction

- Tomorrow Never Knows (2015)
- Hearts of Oak (2020)
- Drunk on All Your Strange New Words (2022)

Non-fiction

- Coen Brothers (2003)
- Who's Next (2005) (with Mark Clapham and Jim Smith)
- Film Noir (2005)
- The Art of Sean Phillips (2013) (with Sean Phillips)

Children's

- Dracula (2009) (with Nicola L. Robinson)
- Secrets of a Fortnite Fan (2021) (with Oscar Herrero)
- Secrets of a Fortnite Fan: Last Squad Standing (2021) (with Oscar Herrero)
- Secrets of a Fortnite Fan: Llama Drama (2021) (with Oscar Herrero)

=== Short stories ===
- Doctor Who
  - The Little Drummer Boy (2003), in Short Trips: Companions
  - The Juror's Story (2004), in Short Trips: Repercussions
  - Visiting Hours (2005), in Short Trips: A Day in the Life
  - Mercury (2005), in Short Trips: The Solar System
  - Not in My Back Yard (2005), in Short Trips: The History of Christmas
  - The Avant Guardian (2006), in Short Trips: Time Signature
  - Remain in Light (2007), in Short Trips: Snapshots
  - Decorative Purposes (2007) in Short Trips: The Ghosts of Christmas
  - Interesting Times (2008) in Short Trips: Christmas Around the World
  - The Power Supply (2009) in Short Trips: Indefinable Magic
- Bernice Summerfield
  - The Light that Never Dies (2000), in The Dead Men Diaries
  - Against Gardens (2004), in A Life Worth Living
  - Match of the Deity (2006), in Something Changed
  - The Two-Level Effect (2006), in Collected Works
  - Thirty Love (2007), in Missing Adventures
  - The Firing Squad (2009), in Secret Histories
- Iris Wildthyme
  - Gimme Shelter (2013), in Iris: Fifteen
  - The Mystery of the Drowned Bird (2012), in The Casebook of the Manleigh Halt Irregulars

== Scriptwriting Credits ==
=== Big Finish ===
- Doctor Who
  - Memory Lane (2006)
  - Phobos (2007)
  - Human Resources (2007)
  - I.D. (2007)
  - Urgent Calls (2007)
  - The Condemned (2008)
  - Grand Theft Cosmos (2008)
  - The Raincloud Man (2008)
  - Masters of War (2008)
  - The Eight Truths/Worldwide Web (2009)
  - Situation Vacant (2010)
  - Prisoner of the Sun (2010)
  - Industrial Evolution (2011)
  - The Five Companions (2011)
  - Binary (2012)
  - The Jupiter Conjunction (2012)
  - The Jigsaw War (2012)
  - The Apocalypse Mirror (2013)
  - 1963: Fanfare for the Common Men (2013)
  - The Secret History (2015)
  - Repeat Offender (2016)
  - The Blood Furnace (2017)
  - Time in Office (2017)
  - Power Game (2019)
  - Intelligence for War (2023)
- Short Trips
  - All Hands On Deck (2017)
  - The Turn Of The Screw (2018)
  - #HarrySullivan (2020)
- Bernice Summerfield
  - The Empire State (2006)
  - Freedom of Information (2007)
  - Beyond the Sea (2008)
  - Secret Origins (2009)
  - Resurrecting the Past (2010)
  - Escaping the Future (2010)
  - Every Dark Thought (2018), in The Story So Far, Volume 2
- River Song
  - The Lifeboat and the Deathboat (2018), in The Diary Of River Song, Series 5
- Susan's War
  - Sphere of Influence (2020)
- Blake's 7
  - False Positive (2012), in The Liberator Chronicles, Volume 2
  - Disorder (2014), in The Liberator Chronicles Volume 7

=== Radio & Audio ===
- Welcome To Our Village, Please Invade Carefully (BBC Radio 2/BBC Radio 4, 11 episodes, 2012–14)
- Adulting (Guardian podcast, 6 episodes, 2017)
- The Space Programme (Fun Kids Radio, 20 episodes, 2020)
- Car Crash (Audible Originals, 10 Episodes, 2021)

=== Television ===
- Hollyoaks (2 episodes, 2014–15)
- Sarah & Duck (6 episodes, 2015–17)
- Class Dismissed (1 episode, 2016)
- The Amazing World Of Gumball (1 episode, 2017)
- Floogals (2 episodes, 2018)
- Dr Panda (16 episodes, 2017–21)
- Humans (3 episodes, 2021)
- P. King Duckling (2 episodes, 2021)
- Tish Tash (8 episodes, 2021)
