= Lisa Bowerman =

British actress (born 1962)

- Born: 1 February 1962 (age 64); Upton-upon-Severn, Worcestershire, England
- Occupation: Actress
- Years active: 1986–present
- Known for: Casualty; Doctor Who
- Partner: David Warner (2006–2022; his death)

Lisa Bowerman (born 1 February 1962) is a British actress. She is best known for portraying Sandra Mute, the paramedic, in the first two series of the BBC One medical drama Casualty, and Doctor Who companion Professor Bernice Summerfield in the long running audio series of the same name and many related audio dramas for Big Finish Productions productions, as well as directing many series for the company.

== Career ==
Bowerman trained at the Bristol Old Vic Theatre School and was a regular in the first two series of BBC medical drama Casualty playing Sandra Mute, the show's first female paramedic. Her other television work includes: Dodgem, The Count of Solar, Grange Hill, The Vision Thing, Doctors, McCallum, Bad Girls and Night and Day. In 2007 she guest-starred as the home secretary's PA in Spooks, and returned to Casualty for a one-episode cameo role as a patient. In 2011 and 2012, she appeared in five episodes of Coronation Street as solicitor Jennifer Lingwood and more recently guested in the ITV/Disney+ drama The Stolen Girl

In July 2014 Bowerman directed episodes 1 and 2 of the audio drama series Osiris by Everybodyelse Productions. In 2018 she directed The Coming of the Martians (also known as The War of The Worlds), starring Colin Morgan, Nigel Lindsay and Ronald Pickup, for Sherwood Sound Studios. She has also directed When Michael Met Benny, a podcast drama as well as an adaptations of Charles Dickens's The Chimes (starring Toby Jones), The Cricket on the Hearth with a casting including Graham Fellows and The Haunted Man starring Paterson Joseph, all for Average Romp Productions.

Bowerman has recorded plays for BBC Radios 3 & 4, and has worked extensively in theatre. She plays the role of Julianne Wright in The Archers.

=== Doctor Who and Bernice Summerfield ===
Bowerman has had a connection with the British science fiction television series Doctor Who—and its assorted spinoffs—since 1989. For the BBC, she played the role of Karra in Survival (the final serial in the original run of Doctor Who in 1989), and voiced Saruba Velak in Dreamland (a 2009 animated serial connected to the revived series). In November 2013 she appeared in the one-off 50th anniversary comedy homage The Five(ish) Doctors Reboot.

Since 1998, Bowerman has played companion Bernice Summerfield in the Big Finish Productions series of the same name. She appeared in six Bernice Summerfield/ Doctor Who audio plays opposite Sylvester McCoy as the Seventh Doctor and Sophie Aldred as Ace, as well as four boxed sets opposite her partner David Warner as the 'Unbound Doctor'; she has starred in over 150 audio plays and audiobooks based solely on Bernice. It is now acknowledged as the longest running female led drama series in any medium. Bowerman has also either directed or played supporting roles in numerous other Big Finish audio series: the latter roles have included Ruby in the Sapphire & Steel stories "Water Like a Stone", "Cruel Immortality" and "Second Sight", Murash in "I, Davros: Guilt" and Ellie in 14 series of Jago & Litefoot starring Trevor Baxter and Christopher Benjamin.

== Filmography ==
=== Television ===
Year	Title	Role	Notes
1986–1987	Casualty	Sandra Mute	15 episodes
1989	Doctor Who	Karra	Survival, 3 episodes
1990	EastEnders	Policewoman	Episode: "1.536"
1991	Dodgem	Miss Baker	2 episodes
1992	Grange Hill	Photographer	Episode: "#15.5"
1992	Screen Two	Maid	Episode: "The Count of Solar"
1993	Seekers	Stable Girl	
1993	Screenplay	Miss Anderson	Episode: "The Vision Thing"
1997	McCallum	Nurse	Episode: "Touch"
2001	2020, History of the Future	Dr. Simons	Episode: "#1.1"
2003	Night and Day	Dr O'Hara	4 episodes
2004	Bad Girls	Doctor	Episode: "#6.7"
2007	Casualty	Mrs Lowe	Episode: "Core Values"
2007	Spooks	Maggie Dibden	Episode: "The Virus: Part 2"
2007	Doctors	Val Thornton	Episode: "Acting Up"
2009	Dreamland	Saruba Velak	Voice; 3 episodes
2010	Doctors	Cynthia Tompkins	Episode: "Sonata"
2011–2012	Coronation Street	Jennifer Lingwood	5 episodes
2013	The Five(ish) Doctors Reboot	Lisa Bowerman	
2014	Hollyoaks	Forensics Officer	Episode: "#1.13846"
2017	Doctors	Dr Claire Jayratnum	2 episodes
2017	The Magical Music Box	Spider	Voice; Episode: "House of Terrors"
2017	The Magical Music Box	Valkyrie/Dr. Roberts	Voice; Episode: "The Valkyries"
2018	The Self Tapers	Tilly Millington-Marriner	Episode: "#1.5"
2019	The Magical Music Box	Nicole	Voice; Episode: "In the Spotlight"
2020	Gentrification	Tilly	All 9 episodes
2020	The Little Back Street in Salford	Olive Shapley	
2025	The Stolen Girl	Maria Blix	3 episodes
