= Stephen Fewell =

British actor

- Occupation: Actor
- Years active: 2004–present

Stephen Fewell is a British actor who portrays Jason Kane in the audio adventures of Bernice Summerfield. He has also appeared in classical theatre, in various Doctor Who audio productions, an episode of the 2005 Channel 4 drama The Courtroom, Headlong Theatre's production of Paradise Lost at the Hackney Empire and in the musical play ENRON at the Royal Court and in the West End.

== Career ==
He has written short stories: three for Doctor Who and one for Bernice Summerfield anthologies.

He originated the role of Charrington in the original Headlong Theatre production of George Orwell's 1984.

In September and October 2012, he played Alan Turing at The English Theatre Frankfurt in Hugh Whitemore's biographical play Breaking the Code.

In 2019 he played the Scofield/McKellen role of Pierre in Venice Preserv'd for the RSC and he appeared as Pope Clement V in the History Channel Knight's Templar drama Knightfall.

Also in 2019, he appeared as Grey in the Netflix film The King.

He is also known as founder and chair of the James Menzies-Kitchin Trust, which has launched the careers of many leading UK theatre directors, including; Thea Sharrock, Polly Findlay, Bijan Sheibani, Joe Hill-Gibbins, and Natalie Abrahami.

In 2022 he appeared in Patriots at the Almeida Theatre.

== Filmography ==
Year	Title	Role	Notes
2004	The Courtroom	Dennis Walton	2 episodes
2019	Knightfall	Archbishop Raymond DeGoth	6 episodes
2019	The King	Grey	Film
2021	The Girlfriend Experience	Physician	Episode: "Mirrors"
2022	Blood, Sex & Royalty	Thomas Cromwell	2 episodes
