= Rebecca Levene =

British author and editor

Rebecca Levene is a British author and editor. She is the author of The Hollow Gods fantasy novel series. In the 1990s, she was an editor at Virgin Books, including notably of the New Adventures series.

== Biography ==
Levene had a sitcom optioned, but never produced by the BBC.

Her first novel, Where Angels Fear, was co-written with Simon Winstone, her deputy and successor on the New Adventures. More recently, she has written for publisher Black Flame, including a Strontium Dog novel Bad Timing and a Final Destination novel End of the Line.

In 2014, she published Smiler's Fair, the first in a fantasy series The Hollow Gods published by Hodder & Stoughton. The second novel in the series The Hunter's Kind was published in July 2015, followed by The Sun's Domain.

She worked on the storyline and script for the Zombies, Run! smart phone app.

== Bibliography ==
Books authored include:

- Bernice Summerfield New Adventures
  - Where Angels Fear, with Simon Winstone
- Black Flame:
  - 2000 AD:
    - Strontium Dog: Bad Timing (June 2004, ISBN 1-84416-110-2)
    - Rogue Trooper: The Quartz Massacre (January 2006, ISBN 1-84416-110-2)
  - Final Destination:
    - End of the Line (June 2005 ISBN 1-84416-176-5)
- Abaddon Books:
  - The Afterblight Chronicles: Kill or Cure (April 2007, ISBN 1-905437-32-3)
  - Tomes of the Dead: Anno Mortis (November 2008, ISBN 1-905437-85-4)
  - The Infernal Game: Cold Warriors (February 2010, ISBN 1-906735-36-0)
  - The Infernal Game: Ghost Dance (July 2010, ISBN 1-906735-38-7)
- Hodder & Stoughton:
  - The Hollow Gods series (3 so far):
    - Smiler's Fair (July 2014, ISBN 978-1-4447-5368-4)
    - The Hunter's Kind (July 2015, ISBN 978-1-4447-5375-2)
    - The Sun's Devices (October 2020, ISBN 978-1-4447-5379-0)
- Poker for Beginners (2006, ISBN 1-84597-275-9)
- With Magnus Anderson, Grand Thieves & Tomb Raiders (2012, ISBN 978-1845137045)
