= Lizzie Hopley =

British actress and writer

Lizzie Hopley is a British actress and writer born in Liverpool who trained at Manchester University and RADA.

== Acting work ==
Hopley starred alongside Jack Whitehall, Lucy Hale and Anjelica Huston in Legacy; alongside Keira Knightley and Ben Whishaw in Black Doves, and in the Steve McQueen directed film Blitz (2024); Her credits include The Reckoning (BBC/ITV), The Crown (Netflix), Time (BBC), The Devil's Hour (Amazon Studios), Brassic, Soulmates (Amazon AMC), The Long Song (BBC/Heyday Films), Little Boy Blue (ITV), Luther (BBC), Cary Fukunaga's Jane Eyre, Pierrepoint with Timothy Spall, The Thirteenth Tale with Vanessa Redgrave, The Suspicions of Mr Whicher (ITV), Any Human Heart (C4), The Day of the Triffids (BBC) with Eddie Izzard and Randall & Hopkirk (Deceased).and starred in the Jimmy Carr and Dawson Bros co-written comedy feature film Fackham Hall (2026).

She can currently be seen as Margaret Thatcher in Shut Out the Light's feature documentary Iron Ladies about the women who maintained the 1884/85 Miners' Strike and will appear in a reimagined version of Romeo and Juliet at the New Vic Theatre in Newcastle-under-Lyme during September and October 2026.

Theatre work includes Caryl Churchill's Far Away in 2025 and the Globe Theatre's 2024 summer season of The Taming of the Shrew and Anne Odeke's debut play Princess Essex. Hopley appeared as Margaret Thatcher in The Audience, written by Peter Morgan (2019). Other theatre work includes The Roaring Girl, Arden of Faversham and The White Devil for the Royal Shakespeare Company (RSC), the original cast of Cheek by Jowl's world tour of 'Tis Pity She's a Whore, Kate in the AFTLS's 2018 US tour of The Taming of the Shrew and Ang in the No. 1 tour of Mike Leigh's Abigail's Party.

As an associate learning practitioner with the RSC, Hopley delivers workshops across the UK, US, China, Japan, South Korea, Malta and Cayman Islands and provides content for their online learning programme. She gives practical tutorials at the British American Drama Academy and designed a professional development course for Guildford School of Acting where she taught as an associate. She has delivered the practical sessions for the annual Shakespeare Foundation Certificate at Oxford University since 2011.

== As a writer ==
Hopley's sitcom pilot, Green, won Pozzitive Television's Funny Dot Comp 2021. In 2021, she won the Scribe Award for the audio play The Curse of Lady Macbeth. Her debut one-woman play Pramface explored the consequences of reality television and labelling people as chavs, and won the Plat Du Jour at the Edinburgh Festival Fringe in 2007.

Her radio plays include The Cenci Family, which starred Sally Hawkins and Daniel Evans for BBC Radio 4, The Elizabethan Beauty Law (starring Annette Badland as Elizabeth I of England) and Salome (starring Florence Hoath and Kenneth Cranham) for BBC Radio 3.

She was commissioned to write Killing Clovis Dardentor, an updated film adaptation of Jules Verne's Clovis Dardentor. She also wrote "Jam", a short film starring Stephen Fry, Annette Badland, Frank Skinner, Paul Daniels and Debbie McGee.

== Big Finish Productions ==
Hopley has written and appeared in over 90 audio plays based on the BBC science fiction television series Doctor Who. Her first appearance was as the Eighth Doctor’s companion Gemma Griffin in Terror Firma. She also portrayed Yarvell, the sister of Davros, in the I, Davros mini-series and was the voice of the TARDIS in audiobook Doctor Who: I, TARDIS : Memoirs of an Impossible Blue Box by Steve Cole.

In 2007 she voiced the Mantasphid Queen in the Doctor Who animated adventure The Infinite Quest, starring David Tenant and Freema Agyeman.

As a writer and actress, her work for Big Finish Productions includes:

- Dark Gallifrey: Master! (starring Eric Roberts) - writer & actress
- Terror Firma – actress
- Night Thoughts – actress
- The Goddess Quandary - actress
- Scorpius - actress
- Fear – actress
- Conversion - actress
- Telos - actress
- Wildthyme at Large - actress
- The Devil in Ms Wildthyme - actress
- I, Davros - actress
- Land of Wonder - actress
- Dark Shadows: Kingdom of the Dead - actress
- Short Trips: The Centenarian - writer
- Short Trips: Snapshots - writer
- Short Trips: Defining Patterns - writer
- Dark Shadows: The Carrion Queen - writer and actress
- Torchwood: The Dying Room - writer
- Class (Big Finish series) Volume 4: The Creeper - writer and actress
- Time Lord Victorious: Mutually Assured Destruction - writer
- The Tenth Doctor & River Song: Precious Annihilation - writer
- Doctor Who: Dalek Universe 3: The First Son - writer
- Doctor Who: The Tenth Doctor and River Song - writer
- Doctor Who: The Eleven (starring Mark Bonnar) - writer
- Doctor Who: The Ninth Doctor Adventures: Lost Warriors - The Curse of Lady Macbeth (Scribe Award Winner 2021) - writer
- Torchwood: Sonny - writer
- Doctor Who: The First Doctor Adventures: The Miniaturist (starring Annette Badland) - writer
- The War Master: Self-Defence, His Greatest Trick & The Shadow Master (all starring Sir Derek Jacobi) - writer
- The Diary of River Song: Beauty on the Inside - writer
- The Diary of River Song: The Wife of River Song - writer
- Doctor Who: The Ninth Doctor Adventures: The Colour of Terror (starring Frank Skinner) - writer
