= List of The Worlds of Doctor Who audio plays by Big Finish =

This is a list of audio productions based on spin offs from the long-running British science fiction television series Doctor Who produced by Big Finish Productions, released under the title The Worlds of Doctor Who.

== Ranges ==
=== Call Me Master (2025–present) ===
On 23 April 2022, Big Finish announced two box sets starring Sacha Dhawan as his incarnation of the Master. Alongside The Fugitive Doctor Adventures, it is the first Big Finish Doctor Who production to be based upon the Chris Chibnall era.

==== Series 1: Inner Demons (2025) ====
No.	Title	Directed by	Written by	Featuring	Released
1	"Self-Help"	Helen Goldwyn	Robert Valentine	The Master	February 2025
2	"The Clockwork Swan"	Helen Goldwyn	Georgia Cook	The Master	February 2025
3	"The Good Life"	Helen Goldwyn	Una McCormack	The Master	February 2025

==== Series 2: Monsters (2025) ====
No.	Title	Directed by	Written by	Featuring	Released
1	"The Craft of Corruption"	Jonathan S Powell	Alison Winter	The Master	September 2025
2	"The Ideal Quarry"	Jonathan S Powell	Jody Houser	The Master	September 2025
3	"Reformation"	Jonathan S Powell	Lisa McMullin	The Master	September 2025

=== Class (2018–2023) ===
==== Volume 1 (2018) ====
No.	Title	Directed by	Written by	Featuring	Released
1	"Gifted"	Scott Handcock	Roy Gill	Ram, April	August 2018
2	"Life Experience"	Scott Handcock	Jenny T Colgan	Ram, Tanya	August 2018
3	"Tell Me You Love Me"	Scott Handcock	Scott Handcock	Charlie, Matteusz, Miss Quill	August 2018

==== Volume 2 (2018) ====
No.	Title	Directed by	Written by	Featuring	Released
1	"Everyone Loves Reagan"	Scott Handcock	Tim Foley	Ram, April, Tanya	August 2018
2	"Now You Know..."	Scott Handcock	Tim Leng	Tanya, Matteusz	August 2018
3	"In Remembrance"	Scott Handcock	Guy Adams	Charlie, Miss Quill, Ace, Daleks	August 2018

==== Volume 3 (2020) ====
No.	Title	Directed by	Written by	Featuring	Released
1	"The Soers' Ditch"	Scott Handcock	Carl Rowens	Charlie, April, Ram, Matteusz	April 2020
2	"Catfish"	Scott Handcock	Kate Thorman	Tanya, Charlie, April, Ram, Matteusz	April 2020
3	"Sweet Nothings"	Scott Handcock	Michael Dennis	Miss Quill, Charlie, Matteusz	April 2020

==== Volume 4 (2020) ====
No.	Title	Directed by	Written by	Featuring	Released
1	"Mock"	Scott Handcock	Alfie Shaw	Charlie, Miss Quill	April 2020
2	"The Creeper"	Scott Handcock	Lizzie Hopley	Matteusz, April, Charlie, Miss Quill	April 2020
3	"The Queen of Rhodia"	Scott Handcock	Blair Mowat	Charlie, Miss Quill	April 2020

==== Secret Diary of a Rhodian Prince (2023) ====
No.	Title	Directed by	Written by	Featuring	Released
–	"Secret Diary of a Rhodian Prince"	Scott Handcock	Blair Mowat	Charlie, Matteusz	January 2023

=== Counter-Measures (2012–2020) ===
Continuing the story of several characters from the serial Remembrance of the Daleks (1988), the British government establishes a new organization called Counter-Measures to investigate reports of advanced technology, the supernatural and alien sightings.

==== Series 1 (2012) ====
No.	Title	Directed by	Written by	Featuring	Released
1	"Threshold"	Ken Bentley	Paul Finch	–	July 2012
2	"Artificial Intelligence"	Ken Bentley	Matt Fitton	Julian St Stephen, Broderick	July 2012
3	"The Pelage Project"	Ken Bentley	Ian Potter	–	July 2012
4	"State of Emergency"	Ken Bentley	Justin Richards	Julian St Stephen	July 2012

==== Series 2 (2013) ====
No.	Title	Directed by	Written by	Featuring	Released
1	"Manhunt"	Ken Bentley	Matt Fitton	Emma, Templeton, West	July 2013
2	"The Fifth Citadel"	Ken Bentley	James Goss	Templeton	July 2013
3	"Peshka"	Ken Bentley	Cavan Scott & Mark Wright	Shurik	July 2013
4	"Sins of the Fathers"	Ken Bentley	John Dorney	Emma, Templeton	July 2013

==== Series 3 (2014) ====
No.	Title	Directed by	Written by	Featuring	Released
1	"Changing of the Guard"	Ken Bentley	Matt Fitton	Templeton, Heaton	July 2014
2	"The Concrete Cage"	Ken Bentley	Justin Richards	–	July 2014
3	"The Forgotten Village"	Ken Bentley	Ken Bentley	–	July 2014
4	"Unto the Breach"	Ken Bentley	John Dorney	Templeton	July 2014

==== Series 4 (2015) ====
No.	Title	Directed by	Written by	Featuring	Released
1	"New Horizons"	Ken Bentley	Mark Wright	Templeton, Captain	July 2015
2	"The Keep"	Ken Bentley	Ken Bentley	Templeton, Heaton, Captain, West, Broderick, Shurik	July 2015
3	"Rise and Shine"	Ken Bentley	John Dorney	Templeton, Heaton	July 2015
4	"Clean Sweep"	Ken Bentley	Matt Fitton	Heaton	July 2015

==== Specials (2016) ====
No.	Title	Directed by	Written by	Featuring	Released
1	"Who Killed Toby Kinsella?"	Ken Bentley	John Dorney	Mikhail	July 2016
2	"The Dead Don't Rise"	Ken Bentley	Ken Bentley	Mikhail	July 2016

==== The New Counter-Measures: Series 1 (2016) ====
No.	Title	Directed by	Written by	Featuring	Released
1	"Nothing to See Here"	Ken Bentley	Guy Adams	–	December 2016
2	"Troubled Waters"	Ken Bentley	Ian Potter	–	December 2016
3	"The Phoenix Strain"	Ken Bentley	Christopher Hatherall	–	December 2016
4	"A Gamble with Time"	Ken Bentley	John Dorney	Suzanne Clare	December 2016

==== The New Counter-Measures: Series 2 (2017) ====
No.	Title	Directed by	Written by	Featuring	Released
1	"The Splintered Man"	Ken Bentley	Roland Moore	–	December 2017
2	"The Ship of the Sleepwalkers"	Ken Bentley	Christopher Hatherall	–	December 2017
3	"My Enemy's Enemy"	Ken Bentley	Robert Khan and Tom Salinsky	Suzanne Clare	December 2017
4	"Time of the Intelligence"	Ken Bentley	Andy Frankham-Allen	Edward Travers, Great Intelligence	December 2017

==== The New Counter-Measures: Series 3 (2019–2020) ====
No.	Title	Directed by	Written by	Featuring	Released
1	"The Hollow King"	Ken Bentley	Ian Potter	–	January 2019
2	"The Movellan Manoeuvre"	Ken Bentley	John Dorney	Suzanne Clare, Movellans	April 2020
3	"The Dalek Gambit"	Ken Bentley	Roland Moore	Suzanne Clare, Movellans, Daleks	April 2020

=== Cyberman (2005–2009) ===
==== Series 1 (2005) ====
No.	Title	Directed by	Written by	Featuring	Released
1	"Scorpius"	Nicholas Briggs	Nicholas Briggs	Paul, Karen, Liam, Samantha, Cybermen, Cyber-Planner	September 2005
2	"Fear"	Nicholas Briggs	Nicholas Briggs	Paul, Karen, Liam, Samantha, Cybermen, Cyber-Planner	October 2005
3	"Conversion"	Nicholas Briggs	Nicholas Briggs	Paul, Karen, Liam, Samantha, Cybermen, Cyber-Planner	November 2005
4	"Telos"	Nicholas Briggs	Nicholas Briggs	Paul, Karen, Liam, Samantha, Cybermen, Cyber-Planner	January 2006

==== Series 2 (2009) ====
No.	Title	Directed by	Written by	Featuring	Released
1	"Outsiders"	Nicholas Briggs	James Swallow	Samantha, Liam, Paul, Cybermen	December 2009
2	"Terror"	Nicholas Briggs	James Swallow	Samantha, Liam, Paul, Cybermen	December 2009
3	"Machines"	Nicholas Briggs	James Swallow	Samantha, Liam, Paul, Cybermen	December 2009
4	"Extinction"	Nicholas Briggs	James Swallow	Samantha, Liam, Paul, Cybermen	December 2009

=== Dalek Empire (2001–2008) ===
==== Series 1 (2001) ====
No.	Title	Directed by	Written by	Featuring	Released
1	"Invasion of the Daleks"	Nicholas Briggs	Nicholas Briggs	Gordon Pellan	June 2001
2	"The Human Factor"	Nicholas Briggs	Nicholas Briggs	Gordon Pellan	August 2001
3	"Death to the Daleks!"	Nicholas Briggs	Nicholas Briggs	Mirana	October 2001
4	"Project Infinity"	Nicholas Briggs	Nicholas Briggs	Mirana, Seer of Yaldos	December 2001

==== Series 2 (2003) ====
No.	Title	Directed by	Written by	Featuring	Released
1	"Dalek War: Chapter One"	Nicholas Briggs	Nicholas Briggs	Mirana, Haredew, Tarkov	January 2003
2	"Dalek War: Chapter Two"	Nicholas Briggs	Nicholas Briggs	Mirana, Haredew, Tarkov, Morli	February 2003
3	"Dalek War: Chapter Three"	Nicholas Briggs	Nicholas Briggs	Mirana, Haredew, Tarkov, Morli	March 2003
4	"Dalek War: Chapter Four"	Nicholas Briggs	Nicholas Briggs	Haredew, Tarkov	April 2003

==== Series 3 (2004) ====
No.	Title	Directed by	Written by	Featuring	Released
1	"The Exterminators"	Nicholas Briggs	Nicholas Briggs	Frey, Kaymee, Culver, Susan	May 2004
2	"The Healers"	Nicholas Briggs	Nicholas Briggs	Frey, Kaymee, Culver, Susan	June 2004
3	"The Survivors"	Nicholas Briggs	Nicholas Briggs	Frey, Kaymee, Culver, Amur Tarkov, Susan	July 2004
4	"The Demons"	Nicholas Briggs	Nicholas Briggs	Amur, Frey, Culver, Susan	August 2004
5	"The Warriors"	Nicholas Briggs	Nicholas Briggs	Frey, Kaymee, Culver, Elaria, Susan	September 2004
6	"The Future"	Nicholas Briggs	Nicholas Briggs	Frey, Kaymee, Haredew, Culver, Elaria, Susan	October 2004

==== Series 4 (2007–2008) ====
No.	Title	Directed by	Written by	Featuring	Released
1	"The Fearless: Part One"	Nicholas Briggs	Nicholas Briggs	Susan	October 2007
2	"The Fearless: Part Two"	Nicholas Briggs	Nicholas Briggs	Susan	November 2007
3	"The Fearless: Part Three"	Nicholas Briggs	Nicholas Briggs	Susan	December 2007
4	"The Fearless: Part Four"	Nicholas Briggs	Nicholas Briggs	–	January 2008

=== Doom's Day (2023) ===
The Doom's Day range is a multi-platform story, with further stories set for release by other production companies.

No.	Title	Directed by	Written by	Featuring	Released
1	"Dawn of an Everlasting Peace"	John Ainsworth	Jacqueline Rayner	–	September 2023
2	"A Date with Destiny"	John Ainsworth	Robert Valentine	Jackie Tyler	September 2023
3	"The Howling Wolves of Xan-Phear"	John Ainsworth	Simon Clark	Silence	September 2023
4	"The Crowd"	John Ainsworth	Lizzie Hopley	Eighth Doctor, Charley Pollard	September 2023

=== Gallifrey (2004–present) ===
==== Series 1 (2004) ====
No.	Title	Directed by	Written by	Featuring	Released
1	"Weapon of Choice"	Gary Russell	Alan Barnes	Romana II, Leela, K9 I & II, Braxiatel, Narvin, Torvald, Darkel, Arkadian, Free Time	March 2004
2	"Square One"	Gary Russell	Stephen Cole	Romana II, Leela, K9 I & II, Braxiatel, Narvin, Free Time	April 2004
3	"The Inquiry"	Gary Russell	Justin Richards	Romana II, Leela, K9 I & II, Braxiatel, Narvin, Darkel, Torvald	April 2004
4	"A Blind Eye"	Gary Russell	Alan Barnes	Romana II, Leela, K9 II, Narvin, Torvald, Arkadian	May 2004

==== Series 2 (2005) ====
No.	Title	Directed by	Written by	Featuring	Released
1	"Lies"	Gary Russell	Gary Russell	Romana II & I, Leela, K9 I & II, Braxiatel, Narvin, Darkel, Andred, Wynter, Pandora, Free Time	April 2005
2	"Spirit"	Gary Russell	Stephen Cole	Romana II, Leela, Braxiatel, Narvin, Darkel, Wynter, Hallan	May 2005
3	"Pandora"	Gary Russell	Justin Richards	Romana II, Leela, K9 I & II, Braxiatel, Narvin, Darkel, Wynter, Andred, Hallan, Valyes, Pandora	June 2005
4	"Insurgency"	Gary Russell	Steve Lyons	Romana II, Leela, K9 I & II, Narvin, Darkel, Andred, Valyes	July 2005
5	"Imperiatrix"	Gary Russell	Stewart Sheargold	Romana II & I, Leela, K9 I & II, Narvin, Darkel, Hallan, Pandora	August 2005

==== Series 3 (2006) ====
No.	Title	Directed by	Written by	Featuring	Released
1	"Fractures"	Gary Russell	Stephen Cole	Romana II, Leela, K9 II, Pandora, Darkel, Narvin, Valyes, Matthias, Hallan, Annos, Janartis, Elbon, Henzil	May 2006
2	"Warfare"	Gary Russell	Stewart Sheargold	Romana II, Leela, K9 II, Pandora, Darkel, Narvin, Valyes, Matthias, Hallan, Annos, Janartis, Elbon	June 2006
3	"Appropriation"	Gary Russell	Paul Sutton	Romana II, Leela, K9 II, Darkel, Narvin, Valyes, Matthias, Henzil, Annos, Janartis	July 2006
4	"Mindbomb"	Gary Russell	Justin Richards	Romana II, Leela, K9 II, Darkel, Braxiatel, Narvin, Valyes, Matthias, Henzil, Annos, Janartis, Elbon	July 2006
5	"Panacea"	Gary Russell	Alan Barnes	Romana II, Leela, K9 II, Braxiatel, Narvin, Valyes, Matthias, Arkadian, Henzil, Annos, Janartis, Elbon	August 2006

==== Series 4 (2011) ====
No.	Title	Directed by	Written by	Featuring	Released
1	"Reborn"	Gary Russell	Gary Hopkins	Romana II, Leela, K9 II, Braxiatel, Narvin; Alternative Romana I, Vansell	March 2011
2	"Disassembled"	Gary Russell	Justin Richards	Romana II, Leela, K9 II, Braxiatel, Narvin; Alternative Romana II, Leela, Burner Doctor, Vansell, Andred	March 2011
3	"Annihilation"	Gary Russell	Scott Handcock & Gary Russell	Romana II, Leela, K9 II, Narvin; Alternative Borusa, Torvald	March 2011
4	"Forever"	Gary Russell	David Wise	Romana II, Leela, K9 II, Braxiatel, Narvin; Alternative Romana II, Narvin, Valyes, Vansell	March 2011

==== Series 5 (2013) ====
No.	Title	Directed by	Written by	Featuring	Released
1	"Emancipation"	Gary Russell	James Peaty	Romana II, Leela, Narvin; Alternative Slyne, Lukas, Kavil, Valyes, Matthias, Rahvon	February 2013
2	"Evolution"	Gary Russell	Una McCormack	Romana II, Leela, Narvin; Alternative Slyne, Lukas, Kavil	February 2013
3	"Arbitration"	Gary Russell	David Llewellyn	Romana II, Leela, Narvin; Alternative Kavil, Slyne, Braxiatel, Matthias, Andred, Rahvon	February 2013

==== Series 6 (2013) ====
No.	Title	Directed by	Written by	Featuring	Released
1	"Extermination"	Gary Russell	Scott Handcock	Romana II, Leela, Narvin, Daleks; Alternative Slyne, Lukas, Rahvon, Braxiatel, Andred	October 2013
2	"Renaissance"	Gary Russell	James Goss	Romana II, Leela, Narvin, Trey	October 2013
3	"Ascension"	Gary Russell	Justin Richards	Romana II, Leela, Narvin, Trey, K9 II, Valyes, Matthias, Slyne, Daleks	October 2013

==== Series 7 (2015) ====
No.	Title	Directed by	Written by	Featuring	Released
–	"Intervention Earth"	Scott Handcock	Scott Handcock & David Llewellyn	Romana III, Ace, Narvin, Omega, Lukas	February 2015

==== Series 8 (2016) ====
No.	Title	Directed by	Written by	Featuring	Released
–	"Enemy Lines"	Scott Handcock	David Llewellyn	Romana II, Leela, Ace, Narvin, Braxiatel	May 2016

==== Series 9: Time War – Volume 1 (2018) ====
No.	Title	Directed by	Written by	Featuring	Released
1	"Celestial Intervention"	Scott Handcock	David Llewellyn	Romana II, Leela, Narvin, Livia, Trave, Ace, Braxiatel	February 2018
2	"Soldier Obscura"	Scott Handcock	Tim Foley	Ace, Braxiatel, Daleks, Romana II, Narvin	February 2018
3	"The Devil You Know"	Scott Handcock	Scott Handcock	Leela, the Master, Romana II, Narvin	February 2018
4	"Desperate Measures"	Scott Handcock	Matt Fitton	Romana II, Narvin, Livia, Trave, Braxiatel, Daleks, Dalek Emperor, Rassilon	February 2018

==== Series 10: Time War – Volume 2 (2019) ====
No.	Title	Directed by	Written by	Featuring	Released
1	"Havoc"	Scott Handcock	David Llewellyn	Romana II, Narvin, Rassilon, Livia, Mantus, Trave	March 2019
2	"Partisans"	Scott Handcock	Una McCormack	Romana II, Narvin, Eris, Livia, Mantus	March 2019
3	"Collateral"	Scott Handcock	Lisa McMullin	Romana II, Narvin, Eris, Rassilon, Livia, Mantus	March 2019
4	"Assassins"	Scott Handcock	Matt Fitton	Romana II, Narvin, Rassilon, Livia, Mantus	March 2019

==== Series 11: Time War – Volume 3 (2020) ====
No.	Title	Directed by	Written by	Featuring	Released
1	"Hostiles"	Scott Handcock	David Llewellyn	Romana II, Narvin	February 2020
2	"Nevernor"	Scott Handcock	Lou Morgan	Romana II, Narvin	February 2020
3	"Mother Tongue"	Scott Handcock	Helen Goldwyn	Leela	February 2020
4	"Unity"	Scott Handcock	David Llewellyn	Romana II, Daleks	February 2020

==== Series 12: Time War – Volume 4 (2021) ====
No.	Title	Directed by	Written by	Featuring	Released
1	"Deception"	Scott Handcock	Lisa McMullin	Leela, Narvin, Rassilon, Livia, Mantus	February 2021
2	"Dissolution"	Scott Handcock	Lou Morgan	Narvin, Rayo, Daleks	February 2021
3	"Beyond"	Scott Handcock	David Llewellyn	Romana II, Braxiatel, Ravenous	February 2021
4	"Homecoming"	Scott Handcock	Matt Fitton	Romana II, Leela, Narvin, Braxiatel, Rassilon, Livia, Mantus, Daleks	February 2021

==== Series 13: War Room 1: Allegiance (2022) ====
No.	Title	Directed by	Written by	Featuring	Released
1	"The Last Days of Freme"	Samuel Clemens	Lou Morgan	Leela, The General, Ollistra, Veklin, Rassilon	August 2022
2	"The Passenger"	Samuel Clemens	David Llewellyn	Leela, The General, Ollistra, Veklin, Rasmus, Rassilon	August 2022
3	"Collateral Victim"	Samuel Clemens	Alfie Shaw	Leela, Rasmus, Veklin, Ollistra	August 2022
4	"The First Days of Phaidon"	Samuel Clemens	Fio Trethewey	Leela, The General, Rasmus, Ollistra, Veklin, Narvin, Daleks	August 2022

==== Series 14: War Room 2: Manoeuvres (2023) ====
No.	Title	Directed by	Written by	Featuring	Released
1	"Collaborators"	Samuel Clemens	Katharine Armitage	Leela	September 2023
2	"Remnants"	Samuel Clemens	Georgia Cook	Rasmus, the General, Veklin, Daleks	September 2023
3	"Transference"	Samuel Clemens	Fio Trethewey	Leela, Ollistra, Narvin	September 2023
4	"Ambition’s Debt"	Samuel Clemens	Katharine Armitage	Daleks	September 2023

==== Echoes Through Eternity (2024) ====
No.	Title	Directed by	Written by	Featuring	Released
1	"Damned If You Do"	Seán Carlsen	Gary Russell	Narvin	November 2024
2	"The Questing Beast"	Miles Richardson	Fio Trethewey & Georgia Cook	Brax	November 2024
3	"In Search of Lost Time"	Sophie Aldred	Una McCormack	Ace	November 2024
4	"Damned If You Don't"	Seán Carlsen	Gary Russell	Narvin	November 2024

==== Series 15: War Room 3: Loyalties (2026) ====
No.	Title	Directed by	Written by	Featuring	Released
1	"Propaganda"	Samuel Clemens	Georgia Cook	Leela, Rassilon, The General, Rasmus, Ollistra, Veklin	June 2026
2	"Resistance"	Samuel Clemens	Katharine Armitage	Leela, Narvin, Veklin, Ollistra, Rasmus, Eris	June 2026
3	"Hope"	Samuel Clemens	Fio Trethewey	Leela, Romana II, Rassilon, Rasmus, Ollistra	June 2026
4	"Eye for an Eye"	Samuel Clemens	Matt Fitton	Leela, Rassilon, The General, Ollistra, Veklin	June 2026

==== Series 16: War Room 4 (2027) ====
No.	Title	Directed by	Written by	Featuring	Released
1	TBA	TBD	TBD	TBA	March 2027
2	TBA	TBD	TBD	TBA	March 2027
3	TBA	TBD	TBD	TBA	March 2027
4	TBA	TBD	TBD	TBA	March 2027

=== Dark Gallifrey (2024–present) ===
==== Series 1: Morbius (2024) ====
No.	Title	Directed by	Written by	Featuring	Released
1	"Part 1"	Samuel Clemens	Tim Foley	Morbius	April 2024
2	"Part 2"	Samuel Clemens	Tim Foley	Morbius	May 2024
3	"Part 3"	Samuel Clemens	Tim Foley	Morbius, Fourth Doctor	June 2024

==== Series 2: The War Master (2024) ====
No.	Title	Directed by	Written by	Featuring	Released
1	"Part 1"	Scott Handcock	James Goss	Unbound Doctor, Bernice Summerfield	July 2024
2	"Part 2"	Scott Handcock	James Goss	War Master, Bernice Summerfield, Captain John Hart	August 2024
3	"Part 3"	Scott Handcock	James Goss	War Master, War Doctor, Bernice Summerfield, Captain John Hart	September 2024

==== Series 3: Missy (2025) ====
No.	Title	Directed by	Written by	Featuring	Released
1	"Part 1"	John Ainsworth	Rochana Patel	Missy	April 2025
2	"Part 2"	John Ainsworth	Rochana Patel	Missy, Seventh Doctor	May 2025
3	"Part 3"	John Ainsworth	Rochana Patel	Missy, The Six	June 2025

==== Series 4: Master! (2025) ====
No.	Title	Directed by	Written by	Featuring	Released
1	"Part 1"	Jason Haigh-Ellery & Steven Kavuma	Lizzie Hopley	The Master, Eighth Doctor	July 2025
2	"Part 2"	Steven Kavuma	Lizzie Hopley	The Master	August 2025
3	"Part 3"	Steven Kavuma	Lizzie Hopley	The Master, Eighth Doctor	September 2025

==== Series 5: The Meddling Monks (2026) ====
No.	Title	Directed by	Written by	Featuring	Released
1	"Part 1"	Jonathan S Powell	John Dorney	The Monk, The Nun	April 2026
2	"Part 2"	Jonathan S Powell	John Dorney	The Monk, The Nun	May 2026
3	"Part 3"	Jonathan S Powell	John Dorney	The Monk, The Nun, Sixth Doctor	June 2026

==== Series 6: The Decayed Master (2026) ====
No.	Title	Directed by	Written by	Featuring	Released
1	"Part 1"	Helen Goldwyn	Lauren Mooney and Stewart Pringle	Decayed Master	July 2026
2	"Part 2"	Helen Goldwyn	Lauren Mooney and Stewart Pringle	Decayed Master	August 2026
3	"Part 3"	Helen Goldwyn	Lauren Mooney and Stewart Pringle	Decayed Master, Third Doctor	September 2026

==== Series 7 (2027) ====
No.	Title	Directed by	Written by	Featuring	Released
1	TBA	TBD	TBD	TBA	April 2027
2	TBA	TBD	TBD	TBA	May 2027
3	TBA	TBD	TBD	TBA	June 2027

==== Series 8 (2027) ====
No.	Title	Directed by	Written by	Featuring	Released
1	TBA	TBD	TBD	TBA	July 2027
2	TBA	TBD	TBD	TBA	August 2027
3	TBA	TBD	TBD	TBA	September 2027

=== I, Davros (2006–2012) ===
==== Series 1 (2006) ====
No.	Title	Directed by	Written by	Featuring	Released
1	"Innocence"	Gary Russell	Gary Hopkins	Davros, Calcula, Yarvell, Magrantine, Thals, Daleks	September 2006
2	"Purity"	Gary Russell	James Parsons & Andrew Stirling-Brown	Davros, Calcula, Yarvell, Magrantine, the Supremo, Thals, Daleks	October 2006
3	"Corruption"	Gary Russell	Lance Parkin	Davros, Calcula, Shan, the Supremo, Ral, Thals, Daleks	November 2006
4	"Guilt"	Gary Russell	Scott Alan Woodard	Davros, Nyder, the Supremo, Ral, Calcula, Thals, Daleks	December 2006

==== Special (2012) ====
No.	Title	Directed by	Written by	Featuring	Released
–	"The Davros Mission"	Nicholas Briggs	Nicholas Briggs	Davros, Daleks	January 2012

=== Jago & Litefoot (2010–2021) ===
==== Series 1 (2010) ====
Series 1 comprised 4 episodes and was released in 2010. It featured the return of Sgt Quick (previously PC Quick), who appeared in The Talons of Weng-Chiang, and the character of Lisa Bowerman's Ellie Higson, a barmaid acquaintance of the pair who had previously featured in The Mahogany Murderers. The series's main antagonist was the mysterious Dr. Tulp, who was previously also mentioned in The Mahogany Murderers.

No.	Title	Directed by	Written by	Featuring	Released
1	"The Bloodless Soldier"	Lisa Bowerman	Justin Richards	Ellie, Quick, Tulp	June 2010
2	"The Bellova Devil"	Lisa Bowerman	Alan Barnes	Ellie, Quick, Sacker, Tulp	June 2010
3	"The Spirit Trap"	John Ainsworth	Jonathan Morris	Ellie	June 2010
4	"The Similarity Engine"	Lisa Bowerman	Andy Lane	Ellie, Quick, Tulp	June 2010

==== Series 2 (2011) ====
Series 2 comprised 4 episodes and was released in January 2011. The series' main antagonist was the vampiric Gabriel Sanders (David Collings)

No.	Title	Directed by	Written by	Featuring	Released
1	"Litefoot and Sanders"	Lisa Bowerman	Justin Richards	Ellie, Quick, Sanders	January 2011
2	"The Necropolis Express"	Lisa Bowerman	Mark Morris	Ellie, Sanders	January 2011
3	"The Theatre of Dreams"	Lisa Bowerman	Jonathan Morris	Ellie, Quick, Sacker, Sanders	January 2011
4	"The Ruthven Inheritance"	Lisa Bowerman	Andy Lane	Ellie, Sacker, Sanders, Leela	January 2011

==== Series 3 (2011) ====
Series 3 was released in June 2011, and featured the return of Louise Jameson's Leela. The season was described by director Lisa Bowerman as resembling a Victorian version of Sapphire and Steel. The series' main antagonist was the mysterious Professor Payne, whose "time breaks" were wreaking havoc all over the country.

No.	Title	Directed by	Written by	Featuring	Released
1	"Dead Men's Tales"	Lisa Bowerman	Justin Richards	Leela, Ellie, Quick	June 2011
2	"The Man at the End of the Garden"	Lisa Bowerman	Matthew Sweet	Leela, Ellie, Quick	June 2011
3	"Swan Song"	Lisa Bowerman	John Dorney	Leela, Payne	June 2011
4	"Chronoclasm"	Lisa Bowerman	Andy Lane	Leela, Ellie, Quick, Payne, Sixth Doctor	June 2011

==== Series 4 (2012) ====
Series 4 was released in March 2012, and guest starred Louise Jameson as Leela and Colin Baker as "Professor Claudius Dark". Its main villains were Mr Kempston and Mr Hardwick, who were pursuing Dark.

No.	Title	Directed by	Written by	Featuring	Released
1	"Jago in Love"	Lisa Bowerman	Nigel Fairs	Leela, Ellie, Quick, Abigail, Sixth Doctor, Kempston, Hardwick	March 2012
2	"Beautiful Things"	Lisa Bowerman	John Dorney	Leela, Ellie, Quick, Sixth Doctor, Kempston, Hardwick	March 2012
3	"The Lonely Clock"	Lisa Bowerman	Matthew Sweet	Leela, Ellie, Sixth Doctor, Kempston, Hardwick	March 2012
4	"The Hourglass Killers"	Lisa Bowerman	Justin Richards	Leela, Sixth Doctor, Ellie, Quick, Abigail, Kempston, Hardwick	March 2012

==== The Voyages of Jago & Litefoot (2012) ====
Following the fourth series, these two one-off stories depicted Jago and Litefoot taking a couple of trips in the TARDIS with the Sixth Doctor. The stories concluded with the Doctor apparently returning the two to the Red Tavern before departing to investigate a temporal surge that threw the TARDIS off-course, only for Jago and Litefoot to learn after the Doctor's departure that he has actually left them in 1968 rather than their home time.

No.	Title	Directed by	Written by	Featuring	Released
1	"Voyage to Venus"	Ken Bentley	Jonathan Morris	Sixth Doctor	October 2012
2	"Voyage to the New World"	Ken Bentley	Matthew Sweet	Sixth Doctor, Wanchese	December 2012

==== Series 5 (2013) ====
Series 5 was released in March 2013. Following Voyage to the New World, it was set in the 1960s. It also featured return of Magnus Greel and Mr Sin, main villain of The Talons of Weng-Chiang, who were resurrected by the series' main antagonist, Guinevere Godiva.

No.	Title	Directed by	Written by	Featuring	Released
1	"The Age of Revolution"	Lisa Bowerman	Jonathan Morris	Ellie, Dave, Godiva, Aubrey	March 2013
2	"The Case of the Gluttonous Guru"	Lisa Bowerman	Marc Platt	Ellie, Dave, Godiva, Aubrey	March 2013
3	"The Bloodchild Codex"	Lisa Bowerman	Colin Brake	Ellie, Dave, Godiva	March 2013
4	"The Final Act"	Lisa Bowerman	Justin Richards	Ellie, Dave, Magnus Greel, Mr Sin, Godiva, Aubrey	March 2013

==== Series 6 (2013) ====
Series 6 was released in September 2013 and set back in the 1890s. Its primary antagonist was the Colonel, portrayed by Geoffrey Whitehead.

No.	Title	Directed by	Written by	Featuring	Released
1	"The Skeleton Quay"	Lisa Bowerman	Jonathan Morris	The Colonel	September 2013
2	"Return of the Repressed"	Lisa Bowerman	Matthew Sweet	–	September 2013
3	"Military Intelligence"	Lisa Bowerman	George Mann	Ellie, Quick, the Colonel, Agatha	September 2013
4	"The Trial of George Litefoot"	Lisa Bowerman	Justin Richards	Ellie, Quick, the Colonel, Agatha	September 2013

==== Series 7 (2014) ====
Series 7 was released in April 2014. It followed Jago and Litefoot's lives as fugitives from the law.

No.	Title	Directed by	Written by	Featuring	Released
1	"The Monstrous Menagerie"	Lisa Bowerman	Jonathan Morris	Ellie, Quick, Abberline, Patsy	April 2014
2	"The Night of 1000 Stars"	Lisa Bowerman	James Goss	Ellie, "Leela"	April 2014
3	"Murder at Moorsey Manor"	Lisa Bowerman	Simon Barnard & Paul Morris	Abberline	April 2014
4	"The Wax Princess"	Lisa Bowerman	Justin Richards	Ellie, Quick, Abberline, Patsy	April 2014

==== Series 8 (2014) ====
No.	Title	Directed by	Written by	Featuring	Released
1	"Encore of the Scorchies"	Lisa Bowerman	James Goss	Ellie, Scorchies	October 2014
2	"The Backwards Men"	Lisa Bowerman	Andy Lane	Ellie, Quick	October 2014
3	"Jago & Litefoot & Patsy"	Lisa Bowerman	Simon Barnard & Paul Morris	Ellie, Quick, Patsy, Darkling Façade	October 2014
4	"Higson & Quick"	Lisa Bowerman	Justin Richards	Ellie, Quick, Patsy, Darkling Façade	October 2014

==== Series 9 (2015) ====
It featured Jago & Litefoot's travel on a cruise. An actor Jamie Newall, who played Aubrey in series 5, played another version of Aubrey in series 8.

No.	Title	Directed by	Written by	Featuring	Released
1	"The Flying Frenchmen"	Lisa Bowerman	Jonathan Morris	Ellie, Quick, Aubrey, Fowler, Mercer, Isobelle	April 2015
2	"The Devil's Dicemen"	Lisa Bowerman	Justin Richards	Aubrey, Betterman, Tibbs	April 2015
3	"Island of Death"	Lisa Bowerman	Simon Barnard & Paul Morris	Isobelle, Aubrey, Tibbs	April 2015
4	"Return of the Nightmare"	Lisa Bowerman	Justin Richards	Ellie, Quick, Aubrey, Fowler, Mercer, Isobelle	April 2015

==== Series 10 (2015) ====
Series 10 was released in 2015, and featured Jago & Litefoot back in London after their cruise. The series' main antagonist was the obsessive Carruthers Summerton.

No.	Title	Directed by	Written by	Featuring	Released
1	"The Case of the Missing Gasogene"	Lisa Bowerman	Simon Barnard & Paul Morris	Ellie, Quick, Summerton	October 2015
2	"The Year of the Bat"	Lisa Bowerman	Jonathan Morris	Ellie, Quick	October 2015
3	"The Mourning After"	Lisa Bowerman	James Goss	Ellie, Quick, Betterman, Summerton	October 2015
4	"The Museum of Curiosities"	Lisa Bowerman	Justin Richards	Ellie, Quick, Betterman, Summerton	October 2015

==== Jago & Litefoot & Strax (2015) ====
This was a one-off special featuring the revived series character, Strax, the Sontaran. It features the usual cast and Dan Starkey as Strax, reprising his role from the TV series. It follows series 10 and was released in November 2015.

No.	Title	Directed by	Written by	Featuring	Released
–	"The Haunting"	Lisa Bowerman	Justin Richards	Ellie, Quick, Strax	November 2015

==== Series 11 (2016) ====
Big Finish released an eleventh series of Jago & Litefoot in April 2016, featuring Geoffrey Beevers as the Master.

No.	Title	Directed by	Written by	Featuring	Released
1	"Jago & Son"	Lisa Bowerman	Nigel Fairs	Ellie, Quick, the Master	April 2016
2	"Maurice"	Lisa Bowerman	Matthew Sweet	Ellie, Quick, the Master	April 2016
3	"The Woman in White"	Lisa Bowerman	Simon Barnard & Paul Morris	Ellie, Quick, the Master	April 2016
4	"Masterpiece"	Lisa Bowerman	Justin Richards	Ellie, Quick, the Master, Sixth Doctor	April 2016

==== Series 12 (2016) ====
Big Finish announced that there would be a twelfth series of Jago & Litefoot, it was released in October 2016.

No.	Title	Directed by	Written by	Featuring	Released
1	"Picture This"	Lisa Bowerman	Justin Richards	Ellie, Quick, the Old One, Ravener	October 2016
2	"The Flickermen"	Lisa Bowerman	Simon Barnard & Paul Morris	Ellie, Quick, the Old One, Ravener, Paul	October 2016
3	"School of Blood"	Lisa Bowerman	Paul Morris	Ellie, Quick, the Old One, Ravener, Paul	October 2016
4	"Warm Blood"	Lisa Bowerman	Justin Richards	Ellie, Quick, the Old One, Ravener	October 2016

==== Series 13 (2017) ====
Big Finish announced that there would be a thirteenth series of Jago & Litefoot, it was released in April 2017.

No.	Title	Directed by	Written by	Featuring	Released
1	"The Stuff of Nightmares"	Lisa Bowerman	Paul Morris	Ellie, Quick	April 2017
2	"Chapel of Night"	Lisa Bowerman	Jonathan Barnes	Ellie, Quick, Angelica	April 2017
3	"How the Other Half Lives"	Lisa Bowerman	Matthew Sweet	Ellie, Quick, Betterman, Aubrey	April 2017
4	"Too Much Reality"	Lisa Bowerman	Justin Richards	Ellie, Quick, Betterman, Aubrey, Angelica	April 2017

==== Special (2018) ====
Following Baxter's death in July 2017, Big Finish announced the release of a single episode to close the series, using archived recordings of Baxter's performances to round out the story.

No.	Title	Directed by	Written by	Featuring	Released
1	"Jago & Litefoot Forever"	Lisa Bowerman	Paul Morris	Ellie, Quick, Leela, Sixth Doctor, Queen Victoria	May 2018

==== Series 14 (2021) ====
A fourteenth series was announced in the format of audiobooks adapting episodes originally planned before Baxter's death.

No.	Title	Directed by	Written by	Featuring	Released
1	"The Red Hand"	Lisa Bowerman	Simon Barnard and Paul Morris, adapted by Paul Morris	Ellie, Inspector Quick	June 2021
2	"The Laughing Policeman"	Lisa Bowerman	Jonathan Barnes, adapted by Julian Richards	Ellie	June 2021
3	"The Corridors of Power"	Lisa Bowerman	Paul Morris	The Eminence	June 2021
4	"A Command Performance"	Lisa Bowerman	Justin Richards and Julian Richards, adapted by Julian Richards	The Eminence	June 2021

==== Awards and nominations ====
Name of the award ceremony, year presented, category, nominee(s) of the award, and the result of the nomination
Award ceremony	Year	Category	Work(s)	Result	Ref.
BBC Audio Drama Awards	2015	Best Online or Non-Broadcast Drama	Encore of the Scorchies	Longlisted	

=== The Lives of Captain Jack (2017–2020) ===
==== Volume 1 (2017) ====
No.	Title	Directed by	Written by	Featuring	Released
1	"The Year After I Died"	Scott Handcock	Guy Adams	–	June 2017
2	"Wednesdays For Beginners"	Scott Handcock	James Goss	Jackie Tyler	June 2017
3	"One Enchanted Evening"	Scott Handcock	James Goss	Alonso Frame	June 2017
4	"Month 25"	Scott Handcock	Guy Adams	–	June 2017

==== Volume 2 (2019) ====
No.	Title	Directed by	Written by	Featuring	Released
1	"Piece of Mind"	Scott Handcock	James Goss	Sixth Doctor	June 2019
2	"What Have I Done?"	Scott Handcock	Guy Adams	–	June 2019
3	"Driving Miss Wells"	Scott Handcock	James Goss	Trinity Wells	June 2019

==== Volume 3 (2020) ====
No.	Title	Directed by	Written by	Featuring	Released
1	"Crush"	Scott Handcock	Guy Adams	Jackie Tyler	March 2020
2	"Mighty and Despair"	Scott Handcock	Tim Foley	–	March 2020
3	"R&J"	Scott Handcock	James Goss	River Song	March 2020

=== Missy (2019–present) ===
==== Series 1 (2019) ====
No.	Title	Directed by	Written by	Featuring	Released
1	"A Spoonful of Mayhem"	Ken Bentley	Roy Gill	Oliver, Lucy	February 2019
2	"Divorced, Beheaded, Regenerated"	Ken Bentley	John Dorney	The Monk	February 2019
3	"The Broken Clock"	Ken Bentley	Nev Fountain	–	February 2019
4	"The Belly of the Beast"	Ken Bentley	Jonathan Morris	–	February 2019

==== Series 2 (2020) ====
No.	Title	Directed by	Written by	Featuring	Released
1	"The Lumiat"	Ken Bentley	Lisa McMullin	-	July 2020
2	"Brimstone and Terror"	Ken Bentley	Roy Gill	Strax, Oliver, Lucy	July 2020
3	"Treason and Plot"	Ken Bentley	Gemma Arrowsmith	Guy Fawkes, The Monk	July 2020
4	"Too Many Masters"	Ken Bentley	John Dorney	The Monk, Ogrons	July 2020

==== Series 3: Missy and the Monk (2021) ====
No.	Title	Directed by	Written by	Featuring	Released
1	"Body and Soulless"	Ken Bentley	James Goss	The Monk	September 2021
2	"War Seed"	Ken Bentley	Johnny Candon	The Monk	September 2021
3	"Two Monks, One Mistress"	Ken Bentley	James Kettle	The Monk, The Nun	September 2021

==== Series 4: Bad Influence (2024) ====
No.	Title	Directed by	Written by	Featuring	Released
1	"Missy and The Time Assassin"	Ken Bentley	David Quantick	–	April 2024
2	"Bad Apple Brigade"	Ken Bentley	Freddie Valdosta	–	April 2024
3	"The Baron Robbers"	Ken Bentley	Lou Morgan	–	April 2024

=== The Paternoster Gang (2019–present) ===
==== Heritage (2019–2020) ====
No.	Title	Directed by	Written by	Featuring	Released
Volume 1
1	"The Cars That Ate London!"	Ken Bentley	Jonathan Morris	–	June 2019
2	"A Photograph to Remember"	Ken Bentley	Roy Gill	Stonn, Bloomsbury Bunch	June 2019
3	"The Ghosts of Greenwich"	Ken Bentley	Paul Morris	–	June 2019
Volume 2
4	"Dining with Death"	Ken Bentley	Dan Starkey	–	October 2019
5	"The Screaming Ceiling"	Ken Bentley	Guy Adams	Thomas Carnacki	October 2019
6	"Spring-Heeled Jack"	Ken Bentley	Gemma Arrowsmith	Spring-Heeled Jack	October 2019
Volume 3
7	"Family Matters"	Ken Bentley	Lisa McMullin	–	May 2020
8	"Whatever Remains"	Ken Bentley	Robert Valentine	–	May 2020
9	"Truth and Bone"	Ken Bentley	Roy Gill	Stonn, Tom Foster	May 2020
Volume 4
10	"Merry Christmas Mr Jago"	Ken Bentley	Paul Morris	Henry Gordon Jago	October 2020
11	"The Ghost Writers"	Ken Bentley	Roy Gill	–	October 2020
12	"Rulers of Earth"	Ken Bentley	Matt Fitton	–	October 2020

==== Trespassers (2023–2025) ====
No.	Title	Directed by	Written by	Featuring	Released
Volume 1: Rogues Gallery
1	"The Ghost and the Potato Man"	Ken Bentley	Barnaby Kay	–	October 2023
2	"Symmetry of Death"	Ken Bentley	Dan Starkey	–	October 2023
3	"Till Death Us Do Part"	Ken Bentley	Lisa McMullin	Eighth Doctor	October 2023
Volume 2: The Casebook of Paternoster Row
4	"Anne of a Thousand Light Years"	Ken Bentley	James Kettle	Fourth Doctor	April 2024
5	"Pater Noster"	Ken Bentley	Gary Russell	–	April 2024
6	"The Gentlemen Thieves"	Ken Bentley	Lauren Mooney, Stewart Pringle	–	April 2024
Volume 3: No Place Like Home
7	"Doppelgängers"	Ken Bentley	Ken Bentley	-	December 2024
8	"Jellyfish!"	Ken Bentley	Neve McIntosh, Dan Starkey	-	December 2024
9	"The Houseguest"	Ken Bentley	Matt Fitton	Second Doctor	December 2024
Volume 4: Last Stand
10	"I Married a Zygon"	Ken Bentley	Alan Ronald	-	March 2025
11	"A Passion for Fashion"	Ken Bentley	Helen Goldwyn	-	March 2025
12	"The Final Problem"	Ken Bentley	Lauren Mooney & Stewart Pringle	Eighth Doctor	March 2025

==== The Misplaced World (2026) ====
No.	Title	Directed by	Written by	Featuring	Released
–	"The Misplaced World"	Ken Bentley	Neve McIntosh and Dan Starkey	Eighth Doctor	December 2026

=== Planet Krynoid (2025–present) ===
==== Series 1: Nightfall (2025) ====
No.	Title	Directed by	Written by	Featuring	Released
1	"Sunlight"	Jonathan S Powell	Jonathan Morris	Governor Hodan, Eighth Doctor, Krynoids	April 2025
2	"Sunset"	Jonathan S Powell	Jonathan S Powell	Governor Hodan, Eighth Doctor, Krynoids	April 2025
3	"Darkness"	Jonathan S Powell	Chris Chapman	Krynoids	April 2025

==== Series 2: Survivors (2026) ====
No.	Title	Directed by	Written by	Featuring	Released
1	"The Hunt"	Jonathan S Powell	Jonathan Morris	Eighth Doctor, Liv Chenka, Krynoids	June 2026
2	"The Harrow"	Jonathan S Powell	Georgia Cook	Eighth Doctor, Liv Chenka, Krynoids	June 2026
3	"The Harvest"	Jonathan S Powell	Jonathan Morris	Eighth Doctor, Liv Chenka, Krynoids	June 2026

=== River Song (2015–present) ===
==== The Diary of River Song (2015–2023) ====
===== Series 1 (2015) =====
No.	Title	Directed by	Written by	Featuring	Released
1	"The Boundless Sea"	Ken Bentley	Jenny T Colgan	Bertie Potts	December 2015
2	"I Went to a Marvellous Party"	Ken Bentley	Justin Richards	Bertie Potts, Mr. Song	December 2015
3	"Signs"	Ken Bentley	James Goss	Mr. Song	December 2015
4	"The Rulers of the Universe"	Ken Bentley	Matt Fitton	Eighth Doctor, Bertie Potts	December 2015

===== Series 2 (2016) =====
No.	Title	Directed by	Written by	Featuring	Released
1	"The Unknown"	Ken Bentley	Guy Adams	Seventh Doctor	December 2016
2	"Five Twenty-Nine"	Ken Bentley	John Dorney	Rachel Burrows	December 2016
3	"World Enough and Time"	Ken Bentley	James Goss	Sixth Doctor	December 2016
4	"The Eye of the Storm"	Ken Bentley	Matt Fitton	Sixth Doctor, Seventh Doctor, Rachel Burrows	December 2016

===== Series 3 (2018) =====
No.	Title	Directed by	Written by	Featuring	Released
1	"The Lady in the Lake"	Ken Bentley	Nev Fountain	Fifth Doctor, Brooke	January 2018
2	"A Requiem for the Doctor"	Ken Bentley	Jacqueline Rayner	Fifth Doctor, Brooke	January 2018
3	"My Dinner with Andrew"	Ken Bentley	John Dorney	Fifth Doctor, Brooke, Madame Kovarian	January 2018
4	"The Furies"	Ken Bentley	Matt Fitton	Fifth Doctor, Brooke, Madame Kovarian	January 2018

===== Series 4 (2018) =====
No.	Title	Directed by	Written by	Featuring	Released
1	"Time in a Bottle"	Ken Bentley	Emma Reeves and Matt Fitton	Spod, Gammarae, Dante	September 2018
2	"Kings of Infinite Space"	Ken Bentley	Donald McLeary	Spod, Gammarae, Dante	September 2018
3	"Whodunnit?"	Ken Bentley	Matt Fitton	Dante, Franz Kafka	September 2018
4	"Someone I Once Knew"	Ken Bentley	John Dorney	Fourth Doctor, Dante, Gammarae	September 2018

===== Series 5 (2019) =====
No.	Title	Directed by	Written by	Featuring	Released
1	"The Bekdel Test"	Ken Bentley	Jonathan Morris	Missy	January 2019
2	"Animal Instinct"	Ken Bentley	Roy Gill	Luke Sullieman, The Decayed Master	January 2019
3	"The Lifeboat and the Deathboat"	Ken Bentley & Jason Haigh-Ellery	Eddie Robson	The Morphant Master	January 2019
4	"Concealed Weapon"	Ken Bentley	Scott Handcock	The War Master	January 2019

===== Series 6 (2019) =====
No.	Title	Directed by	Written by	Featuring	Released
1	"An Unearthly Woman"	Ken Bentley	Matt Fitton	First Doctor, Susan Foreman, Ian Chesterton, Barbara Wright (An Unearthly Child)	August 2019
2	"The Web of Time"	Ken Bentley	John Dorney	Captain Knight, Yeti, The Great Intelligence (The Web of Fear)	August 2019
3	"Peepshow"	Ken Bentley	Guy Adams	Third Doctor, Ogrons, Sontarans, Drashigs (Carnival of Monsters)	August 2019
4	"The Talents of Greel"	Ken Bentley	Paul Morris	Henry Gordon Jago, Weng-Chiang (The Talons of Weng-Chiang)	August 2019

===== Series 7 (2020) =====
No.	Title	Directed by	Written by	Featuring	Released
1	"Colony of Strangers"	Ken Bentley	James Goss	–	January 2020
2	"Abbey of Heretics"	Ken Bentley	Lizbeth Myles	–	January 2020
3	"Barrister to the Stars"	Ken Bentley	James Kettle	–	January 2020
4	"Carnival of Angels"	Ken Bentley	Roy Gill	Luke Sullieman, Weeping Angels	January 2020

===== Series 8 (2021) =====
No.	Title	Directed by	Written by	Featuring	Released
1	"Slight Glimpses of Tomorrow"	Ken Bentley	James Goss	Rachel Burrows	January 2021
2	"A Brave New World"	Ken Bentley	Tracy Ann Baines	Tenth Doctor, Rachel Burrows	January 2021
3	"A Forever Home"	Ken Bentley	Alfie Shaw	K9	January 2021
4	"Queen of the Mechonoids"	Ken Bentley	Jonathan Morris	Anya Kingdom, Mark Seven, Mechonoids	January 2021

===== Series 9: New Recruit (2021) =====
No.	Title	Directed by	Written by	Featuring	Released
1	"The Blood Woods"	Ken Bentley	Lizbeth Myles	The Brigadier, Liz Shaw	October 2021
2	"Terror of the Suburbs"	Ken Bentley	James Kettle	Liz Shaw	October 2021
3	"Never Alone"	Ken Bentley	Helen Goldwyn	Liz Shaw	October 2021
4	"Rivers of Light"	Ken Bentley	Lisa McMullin	Third Doctor, The Brigadier, Liz Shaw, The Master	October 2021

===== Series 10: Two Rivers and a Firewall (2022) =====
No.	Title	Directed by	Written by	Featuring	Released
1	"The Two Rivers"	Ken Bentley	Tim Foley	–	August 2022
2	"Beauty on the Inside"	Ken Bentley	Lizzie Hopley	–	August 2022
3	"Black Friday"	Ken Bentley	Lauren Mooney and Stewart Pringle	Autons	August 2022
4	"Firewall"	Ken Bentley	Barnaby Kay	Proper Dave	August 2022

===== Series 11: Friend of the Family (2023) =====
No.	Title	Directed by	Written by	Featuring	Released
1	"The Rules of the House"	Ken Bentley	Tim Foley	–	January 2023
2	"The Key to the Door"	Ken Bentley	Tim Foley	–	January 2023
3	"The Bird from the Nest"	Ken Bentley	Tim Foley	–	January 2023
4	"The Isle on the Shore"	Ken Bentley	Tim Foley	–	January 2023

===== Series 12: The Orphan Quartet (2023) =====
No.	Title	Directed by	Written by	Featuring	Released
1	"The Excise Men"	David O'Mahony	Lou Morgan	–	August 2023
2	"Harvest of the Krotons"	David O'Mahony	James Goss	Jackie Tyler, Krotons	August 2023
3	"Dead Man Talking"	David O'Mahony	Tim Foley	–	August 2023
4	"The Wife of River Song"	David O'Mahony	Lizzie Hopley	Brooke	August 2023

==== The Death and Life of River Song (2024–present) ====
===== Series 1: Last Words (2024) =====
No.	Title	Directed by	Written by	Featuring	Released
1	"Apokalypsis"	Ken Bentley	Robert Valentine	-	August 2024
2	"Fate and Fatality"	Ken Bentley	Robert Valentine	-	August 2024
3	"The Black Hours"	Ken Bentley	Robert Valentine	-	August 2024
4	"Book of the Dead"	Ken Bentley	Robert Valentine	-	August 2024

===== Series 2: Ace and Tegan (2025) =====
No.	Title	Directed by	Written by	Featuring	Released
1	"Castaways"	Ken Bentley	James Moran	Dorothy 'Ace' McShane, Tegan Jovanka	March 2025
2	"Driftwood"	Ken Bentley	Roland Moore	Ace	March 2025
3	"Dead Rising"	Ken Bentley	Roland Moore	Tegan	March 2025
4	"The End is the Beginning is the End"	Ken Bentley	James Moran	Ace, Tegan	March 2025

===== Series 3: The Dissolution of Time (2025) =====
No.	Title	Directed by	Written by	Featuring	Released
1	"The Armageddon Game"	Ken Bentley	Rochana Patel	–	August 2025
2	"Anne Boleyn Must Die"	Ken Bentley	Rochana Patel	–	August 2025
3	"A Good Woman Goes to War"	Ken Bentley	Rochana Patel	–	August 2025
4	"The Schism Bloom"	Ken Bentley	Rochana Patel	–	August 2025

===== Series 4: War Widow (2026) =====
No.	Title	Directed by	Written by	Featuring	Released
1	"The Shape of Fear"	Ken Bentley	James Kettle	Eighth Doctor	September 2026
2	"Bad Timing"	Ken Bentley	Matt Fitton	Eighth Doctor, Daleks	September 2026
3	"Unchained Melodies"	Ken Bentley	Lisa McMullin	–	September 2026
4	"The Reality Director"	Ken Bentley	John Dorney	–	September 2026

===== Series 5: River and Rory (2027) =====
No.	Title	Directed by	Written by	Featuring	Released
1	"Bog Man"	Scott Handcock and Ken Bentley	Lizzie Hopley	Rory Williams	February 2027
2	"Life Lessons"	Scott Handcock and Ken Bentley	Karissa Hamilton-Bannis	Rory Williams	February 2027
3	"A Most Dangerous Game"	Scott Handcock and Ken Bentley	Robert Valentine	Rory Williams	February 2027
4	"The Tashpa Stone"	Scott Handcock and Ken Bentley	Shai Hussain and John Dorney	Rory Williams	February 2027

=== The Robots (2019–2023) ===
==== Series 1 (2019) ====
No.	Title	Directed by	Written by	Featuring	Released
1	"The Robots of Life"	Ken Bentley	Roland Moore	Kaldor Androids	December 2019
2	"The Sentient"	Ken Bentley	Robert Whitelock	Kaldor Androids	December 2019
3	"Love Me Not"	Ken Bentley	John Dorney	Kaldor Androids	December 2019

==== Series 2 (2020) ====
No.	Title	Directed by	Written by	Featuring	Released
1	"Robots of War"	Ken Bentley	Roland Moore	Sandminer Robots	July 2020
2	"Toos and Poul"	Ken Bentley	Andrew Smith	Toos, Poul, Sandminer Robots	July 2020
3	"Do No Harm"	Ken Bentley	Sarah Grochala	Sandminer Robots	July 2020

==== Series 3 (2020) ====
No.	Title	Directed by	Written by	Featuring	Released
1	"The Mystery of Sector 13"	Louise Jameson	Robert Whitelock	Kaldor Androids	December 2020
2	"Circuit Breaker"	Ken Bentley	Guy Adams	Lish Toos, Ander Poul, Kaldor Androids	December 2020
3	"A Matter of Conscience"	Louise Jameson	Lisa McMullin	Kaldor Androids	December 2020

==== Series 4 (2021) ====
No.	Title	Directed by	Written by	Featuring	Released
1	"Closed Loop"	Ken Bentley	Guy Adams	Toos, Poul, D84	June 2021
2	"Off Grid"	Ken Bentley	Sarah Grochala	Kaldor androids	June 2021
3	"The Janus Deception"	Ken Bentley	Robert Whitelock	Kaldor androids	June 2021

==== Series 5 (2022) ====
No.	Title	Directed by	Written by	Featuring	Released
1	"The Enhancement"	Ken Bentley	Aaron Douglas	Volar Crick, Graff Kirrin, Kaldor androids	May 2022
2	"Machines Like Us"	Ken Bentley	Phil Mulryne	Graff Kirrin, Kaldor Androids	May 2022
3	"Kaldor Nights"	Ken Bentley	Tim Foley	Vash Sorkov, Kaldor Androids	May 2022

==== Series 6 (2023) ====
No.	Title	Directed by	Written by	Featuring	Released
1	"Force of Nature"	Ken Bentley	Helen Goldwyn	Sorkov, Kirran, Kaldor androids	April 2023
2	"Face to Face"	Ken Bentley	John Dorney	–	April 2023
3	"The Final Hour"	Ken Bentley	Matt Fitton	Sorkov, Kirran, Eighth Doctor, Kaldor androids	April 2023

=== Rose Tyler (2019–present) ===
==== Volume 1: The Dimension Cannon (2019) ====
No.	Title	Directed by	Written by	Featuring	Released
1	"The Endless Night"	Helen Goldwyn	Jonathan Morris	Pete, Clive	September 2019
2	"The Flood"	Helen Goldwyn	Lisa McMullin	Pete, Clive	September 2019
3	"The Ghost Machines"	Helen Goldwyn	AK Benedict	Pete, Clive	September 2019
4	"The Last Party on Earth"	Helen Goldwyn	Matt Fitton	Jackie	September 2019

==== Volume 2: Other Worlds (2022) ====
No.	Title	Directed by	Written by	Featuring	Released
1	"Saltwater"	Helen Goldwyn	Alison Winter	Jackie, Clive	October 2022
2	"Now is the New Dark"	Helen Goldwyn	AK Benedict	Jackie, Clive	October 2022
3	"The Rogue Planet"	Helen Goldwyn	Emily Cook	Jackie, Clive	October 2022

==== Volume 3: Trapped (2023) ====
No.	Title	Directed by	Written by	Featuring	Released
1	"Sink or Swim"	Helen Goldwyn	Lizzie Hopley	Jackie, Danni	September 2023
2	"The Lower Road"	Helen Goldwyn	Tim Foley	Danni	September 2023
3	"The Good Samaritan"	Helen Goldwyn	Helen Goldwyn	Jackie, Danni	September 2023

=== Sarah Jane Smith (2002–2006) ===
==== Series 1 (2002) ====
No.	Title	Directed by	Written by	Featuring	Released
1	"Comeback"	Gary Russell	Terrance Dicks	Sarah Jane, Josh, Natalie	July 2002
2	"The TAO Connection"	Gary Russell	Barry Letts	Sarah Jane, Josh, Natalie	August 2002
3	"Test of Nerve"	Gary Russell	David Bishop	Sarah Jane, Josh, Natalie	September 2002
4	"Ghost Town"	Gary Russell	Rupert Laight	Sarah Jane, Josh	October 2002
5	"Mirror, Signal, Manoeuvre"	Gary Russell	Peter Anghelides	Sarah Jane, Josh, Natalie	November 2002

==== Series 2 (2006) ====
No.	Title	Directed by	Written by	Featuring	Released
1	"Buried Secrets"	John Ainsworth	David Bishop	Sarah Jane, Josh, Natalie, Will	January 2006
2	"Snow Blind"	John Ainsworth	David Bishop	Sarah Jane, Josh, Will	February 2006
3	"Fatal Consequences"	John Ainsworth	David Bishop	Sarah Jane, Josh, Will	March 2006
4	"Dreamland"	John Ainsworth	David Bishop	Sarah Jane, Josh, Natalie	April 2006

=== Susan's War (2020–present) ===
==== Series 1 (2020) ====
No.	Title	Directed by	Written by	Featuring	Released
1	"Sphere of Influence"	Lisa Bowerman	Eddie Robson	Sensorites, Ian Chesterton, Veklin	April 2020
2	"The Uncertain Shore"	Lisa Bowerman	Simon Guerrier	Veklin, Ogrons	April 2020
3	"Assets of War"	Lisa Bowerman	Lou Morgan	Veklin, Rasmus, Orrovix	April 2020
4	"The Shoreditch Intervention"	Lisa Bowerman	Alan Barnes	Eighth Doctor, Daleks	April 2020

==== Series 2: Family Ties (2024) ====
No.	Title	Directed by	Written by	Featuring	Released
1	"The Lost Son"	John Ainsworth	Sarah Cassidy	Alex Campbell	August 2024
2	"The Golden Child"	John Ainsworth	Peter Anghelides	War Doctor	August 2024

==== Series 3: Grandfather Time (2025) ====
No.	Title	Directed by	Written by	Featuring	Released
1	"The Last of the Kaleds"	John Ainsworth	David Llewellyn	War Doctor, Kaleds	March 2025
2	"The Voord Alliance"	John Ainsworth	Andrew Smith	War Doctor, the Voord	March 2025

=== UNIT (2004–present) ===
==== Series 1 (2004–2005) ====
No.	Title	Directed by	Written by	Featuring	Released
0	"The Coup"	Ian Farrington	Simon Guerrier	The Brigadier, Chaudhry, Currie, ICIS	November 2004
1	"Time Heals"	Jason Haigh-Ellery	Iain McLaughlin & Claire Bartlett	Chaudhry, Dalton, the Brigadier, Hoffman, Currie, ICIS	December 2004
2	"Snake Head"	John Ainsworth	Jonathan Clements	Chaudhry, Dalton, Hoffman	January 2005
3	"The Longest Night"	Edward Salt	Joseph Lidster	Chaudhry, Dalton, Hoffman, Currie, ICIS	March 2005
4	"The Wasting"	Nicola Bryant	Iain McLaughlin & Claire Bartlett	Chaudhry, the Brigadier, Currie, Brimmicombe-Wood, ICIS	June 2005

==== Special (2012) ====
No.	Title	Directed by	Written by	Featuring	Released
–	"Dominion"	Nicholas Briggs	Jason Arnopp & Nicholas Briggs	Seventh Doctor, Raine, Klein, the Master	October 2012

==== Brave New World (2022–2026) ====
No.	Title	Directed by	Written by	Featuring	Released
Volume 1: Seabird One
1	"Rogue State"	Scott Handcock	Robert Valentine	Brigadier Bambera, Sergeant Jean-Paul Savarin	July 2022
2	"Time Flies"	Scott Handcock	Alison Winter	Brigadier Bambera, Sergeant Jean-Paul Savarin, Dr Louise Rix	July 2022
3	"Dark Side of the Moon"	Scott Handcock	Alfie Shaw	Brigadier Bambera, Sergeant Jean-Paul Savarin, Dr Louise Rix	July 2022
Volume 2: Visitants
1	"The Frequency"	Scott Handcock	Tajinder Singh Hayer	Brigadier Bambera, Sergeant Jean-Paul Savarin, Dr Louise Rix	December 2022
2	"Haunt"	Scott Handcock	Lizzie Hopley	Brigadier Bambera, Sergeant Jean-Paul Savarin, Dr Louise Rix	December 2022
3	"The Last Line of Defence"	Scott Handcock	Robert Valentine	Brigadier Bambera, Sergeant Jean-Paul Savarin, Dr Louise Rix	December 2022
Volume 3: Fractures
1	"Kaiju"	Samuel Clemens	Robert Valentine	Brigadier Bambera, Sergeant Jean-Paul Savarin, Dr Louise Rix	June 2025
2	"Debrief"	Samuel Clemens	Alfie Shaw	Brigadier Bambera, Sergeant Jean-Paul Savarin, Dr Louise Rix	June 2025
3	"Shatterpoint"	Samuel Clemens	Mark Wright	Brigadier Bambera, Sergeant Jean-Paul Savarin, Dr Louise Rix	June 2025
Volume 4: Knightfall
1	"Deep Water"	Samuel Clemens	Georgia Cook	Brigadier Bambera, Sergeant Jean-Paul Savarin, Dr Louise Rix, Ancelyn	March 2026
2	"Storm Over Albion"	Samuel Clemens	Felicia Barker	Brigadier Bambera, Sergeant Jean-Paul Savarin, Dr Louise Rix, Ancelyn	March 2026
3	"Shining Armour"	Samuel Clemens	Robert Valentine	Brigadier Bambera, Sergeant Jean-Paul Savarin, Dr Louise Rix, Ancelyn	March 2026

==== Eras (2026) ====
No.	Title	Directed by	Written by	Featuring	Released
Volume 1: Hostile Universe
1	"Rise of the Valiant"	Samuel Clemens	Andrew Smith	The Brigadier, Harry Sullivan, Colonel Mace, Daleks	April 2026
2	"The Indigo Child"	Ken Bentley	Ken Bentley	Kate, Osgood	April 2026
3	"The Life and Death of Private Eddie Wise"	Jonathan S Powell	Hannah Kennedy	Sarah Jane, the Brigadier	April 2026
4	"Deadstar"	Helen Goldwyn	Jonathan S Powell	Mel Bush, the Vlinx, Kate	April 2026

=== UNIT: The New Series (2015–present) ===
==== Series 1: Extinction (2015) ====
No.	Title	Directed by	Written by	Featuring	Released
1	"Vanguard"	Ken Bentley	Matt Fitton	Kate, Osgood, Shindi, Josh, Nestene Consciousness, Autons	November 2015
2	"Earthfall"	Ken Bentley	Andrew Smith	Kate, Osgood, Shindi, Josh, Sam, Autons	November 2015
3	"Bridgehead"	Ken Bentley	Andrew Smith	Kate, Osgood, Shindi, Josh, Nestene Consciousness	November 2015
4	"Armageddon"	Ken Bentley	Matt Fitton	Kate, Osgood, Shindi, Josh, Sam, Nestene Consciousness	November 2015

==== Series 2: Shutdown (2016) ====
No.	Title	Directed by	Written by	Featuring	Released
1	"Power Cell"	Ken Bentley	Matt Fitton	Kate, Osgood, Josh	May 2016
2	"Death in Geneva"	Ken Bentley	Andrew Smith	Kate, Osgood, Josh, Sam, Tengobushi	May 2016
3	"The Battle of the Tower"	Ken Bentley	Andrew Smith	Kate, Osgood, Josh, Tengobushi	May 2016
4	"Ice Station Alpha"	Ken Bentley	Matt Fitton	Kate, Osgood, Josh, Sam, Tengobushi	May 2016

==== Series 3: Silenced (2016) ====
No.	Title	Directed by	Written by	Featuring	Released
1	"House of Silents"	Ken Bentley	Matt Fitton	Kate, Osgood, Josh, Shindi, Silents	November 2016
2	"Square One"	Ken Bentley	John Dorney	Kate, Osgood, Sam, Josh, Silents	November 2016
3	"Silent Majority"	Ken Bentley	John Dorney	Kate, Osgood, Sam, Josh, Silents	November 2016
4	"In Memory Alone"	Ken Bentley	Matt Fitton	Kate, Osgood, Sam, Josh, Shindi, Silents	November 2016

==== Series 4: Assembled (2017) ====
No.	Title	Directed by	Written by	Featuring	Released
1	"Call to Arms"	Ken Bentley	Matt Fitton	Kate, Osgood, Josh, John Benton, Mike Yates, Silurians	May 2017
2	"Tidal Wave"	Ken Bentley	Guy Adams	Kate, Osgood, Jo Jones, Sea Devils	May 2017
3	"Retrieval"	Ken Bentley	Guy Adams	Kate, Osgood, Josh, Sam, Silurians	May 2017
4	"United"	Ken Bentley	Matt Fitton	Kate, Osgood, Josh, Sam, John Benton, Mike Yates, Jo Jones, Silurians	May 2017

==== Series 5: Encounters (2017) ====
No.	Title	Directed by	Written by	Featuring	Released
1	"The Dalek Transaction"	Ken Bentley	Matt Fitton	Kate, Osgood, Josh, Shindi, Daleks	November 2017
2	"Invocation"	Ken Bentley	Roy Gill	Kate, Osgood, Josh, Shindi	November 2017
3	"The Sontaran Project"	Ken Bentley	Andrew Smith	Kate, Osgood, Shindi, Sontarans	November 2017
4	"False Negative"	Ken Bentley	John Dorney	Kate, Osgood, Josh, Shindi	November 2017

==== Series 6: Cyber-Reality (2018) ====
No.	Title	Directed by	Written by	Featuring	Released
1	"Game Theory"	Ken Bentley	Matt Fitton	Kate, Osgood, Sam, Josh, Shindi	May 2018
2	"Telepresence"	Ken Bentley	Guy Adams	Kate, Osgood, Josh, Shindi	May 2018
3	"Code Silver"	Ken Bentley	Guy Adams	Kate, Osgood, Sam, Josh, Shindi, Cybermen	May 2018
4	"Master of Worlds"	Ken Bentley	Matt Fitton	Kate, Osgood, Sam, Josh, Shindi, Cybermen, the Master	May 2018

==== Series 7: Revisitations (2018) ====
No.	Title	Directed by	Written by	Featuring	Released
1	"Hosts of the Wirrn - Part 1"	Ken Bentley	Chris Chapman	Kate, Osgood, Josh, Shindi, Wirrn	November 2018
2	"Hosts of the Wirrn - Part 2"	Ken Bentley	Chris Chapman	Kate, Osgood, Josh, Shindi, Wirrn	November 2018
3	"Breach of Trust"	Ken Bentley	David K Barnes	Kate, Osgood, Josh, Shindi	November 2018
4	"Open the Box"	Ken Bentley	Roy Gill	Kate, Osgood, Josh, Shindi, Chin Lee	November 2018

==== Series 8: Incursions (2019) ====
No.	Title	Directed by	Written by	Featuring	Released
1	"This Sleep of Death"	Ken Bentley	Jonathan Morris	Kate, Osgood, Josh, Sam, Static	April 2019
2	"Tempest"	Ken Bentley	Lisa McMullin	Kate, Osgood, Sam	April 2019
3	"The Power of River Song - Part 1"	Ken Bentley	Guy Adams	Kate, Osgood, Josh, Sam, River Song, Jacqui	April 2019
4	"The Power of River Song - Part 2"	Ken Bentley	Guy Adams	Kate, Osgood, Josh, Sam, River Song, Jacqui	April 2019

==== Nemesis 1: Between Two Worlds (2021) ====
No.	Title	Directed by	Written by	Featuring	Released
1	"The Enemy Beyond"	Ken Bentley	Andrew Smith	Kate, Osgood, The Eleven, Josh	November 2021
2	"Fire and Ice"	Ken Bentley	John Dorney	Kate, Osgood, Harry Sullivan, Naomi Cross, Ice Warriors, The Eleven	November 2021
3	"Eleven's Eleven"	Ken Bentley	Lisa McMullin	Kate, Osgood, The Eleven, Josh	November 2021
4	"The Curator's Gambit"	Ken Bentley	Andrew Smith	Kate, Osgood, The Eleven, The Curator, Harry Sullivan, Josh	November 2021

==== Nemesis 2: Agents of the Vulpreen (2022) ====
No.	Title	Directed by	Written by	Featuring	Released
1	"The Man From Gallifrey"	Ken Bentley	Andrew Smith	Kate, Osgood, the Eleven	March 2022
2	"Power of the Dominators"	Ken Bentley	Kenneth Grant	Kate, Osgood, Dominators, Quarks	March 2022
3	"The War Factory"	Ken Bentley	Lizzie Hopley	Kate, Osgood, Brigadier Winifred Bambera, the Eleven	March 2022
4	"Ten Minutes in Hell"	Ken Bentley	John Dorney	Kate, Osgood	March 2022

==== Nemesis 3: Objective – Earth (2022) ====
No.	Title	Directed by	Written by	Featuring	Released
1	"The Vulpreen Encounter"	Ken Bentley	Andrew Smith	Kate, Osgood, Jacqui	November 2022
2	"By Jacqui McGee"	Ken Bentley	Lisa McMullin	Kate, Osgood, Jacqui	November 2022
3	"Axos Unleashed"	Ken Bentley	Katharine Armitage	Kate, Osgood, Axos	November 2022
4	"Time of the Vulpreen"	Ken Bentley	Roland Moore	Kate, Osgood, The Eleven	November 2022

==== Nemesis 4: Masters of Time (2023) ====
No.	Title	Directed by	Written by	Featuring	Released
1	"One Way or Another"	Ken Bentley	John Dorney	Kate, Osgood	July 2023
2	"Traitor's Gate"	Ken Bentley	Sarah Grochala	Kate, Osgood	July 2023
3	"The Destiny Labyrinth"	Ken Bentley	Alison Winter	Kate, Osgood	July 2023
4	"True Nemesis"	Ken Bentley	Andrew Smith	Kate, Osgood, Missy	July 2023

=== The War Master (2017–present) ===
==== Series 1: Only the Good (2017) ====
No.	Title	Directed by	Written by	Featuring	Released
1	"Beneath the Viscoid"	Scott Handcock	Nicholas Briggs	Daleks	December 2017
2	"The Good Master"	Scott Handcock	Janine H Jones	Cole Jarnish, Daleks	December 2017
3	"The Sky Man"	Scott Handcock	James Goss	Cole Jarnish	December 2017
4	"The Heavenly Paradigm"	Scott Handcock	Guy Adams	Cole Jarnish	December 2017

==== Series 2: The Master of Callous (2018) ====
No.	Title	Directed by	Written by	Featuring	Released
1	"Call for the Dead"	Scott Handcock	James Goss	Ood, Martine King, Cassandra King	December 2018
2	"The Glittering Prize"	Scott Handcock	James Goss	Ood, Martine King, Cassandra King	December 2018
3	"The Persistence of Dreams"	Scott Handcock	Guy Adams	Ood, Martine King, Cassandra King	December 2018
4	"Sins of the Father"	Scott Handcock	Guy Adams	Ood, Narvin, Cassandra King	December 2018

==== Series 3: Rage of the Time Lords (2019) ====
No.	Title	Directed by	Written by	Featuring	Released
1	"The Survivor"	Scott Handcock	Tim Foley	Alice Pritchard	July 2019
2	"The Coney Island Chameleon"	Scott Handcock	David Llewellyn	Giuseppe Sabatini	July 2019
3	"The Missing Link"	Scott Handcock	Tim Foley	Eighth Doctor, Alice Pritchard	July 2019
4	"Darkness and Light"	Scott Handcock	David Llewellyn	Eighth Doctor	July 2019

==== Series 4: Anti-Genesis (2019) ====
No.	Title	Directed by	Written by	Featuring	Released
1	"From the Flames"	Scott Handcock	Nicholas Briggs	Narvin, Livia	December 2019
2	"The Master's Dalek Plan"	Scott Handcock	Alan Barnes	Narvin, Livia, Daleks	December 2019
3	"Shockwave"	Scott Handcock	Alan Barnes	Narvin, Livia, Daleks, The Master (Unbound)	December 2019
4	"He Who Wins"	Scott Handcock	Nicholas Briggs	Narvin, Livia, Daleks, The Master (Unbound)	December 2019

==== Series 5: Hearts of Darkness (2020) ====
No.	Title	Directed by	Written by	Featuring	Released
1	"The Edge of Redemption"	Scott Handcock	David Llewellyn	Narvin	October 2020
2	"The Scaramancer"	Scott Handcock	Lisa McMullin	–	October 2020
3	"The Castle of Kurnos 5"	Scott Handcock	David Llewellyn	Eighth Doctor	October 2020
4	"The Cognition Shift"	Scott Handcock	Lisa McMullin	Eighth Doctor	October 2020

==== Series 6: Killing Time (2021) ====
No.	Title	Directed by	Written by	Featuring	Released
1	"The Sincerest Form of Flattery"	Scott Handcock	James Goss	–	August 2021
2	"A Quiet Night In"	Scott Handcock	Lou Morgan	Jo Jones	August 2021
3	"The Orphan"	Scott Handcock	Lou Morgan	Nyssa	August 2021
4	"Unfinished Business"	Scott Handcock	James Goss	–	August 2021

==== Series 7: Self-Defence (2022) ====
No.	Title	Directed by	Written by	Featuring	Released
1	"The Forest of Penitence"	Scott Handcock	Lou Morgan	–	June 2022
2	"The Players"	Scott Handcock	Una McCormack	–	June 2022
3	"Boundaries"	Scott Handcock	Lizbeth Myles	Cole Jarnish	June 2022
4	"The Last Line"	Scott Handcock	Lizzie Hopley	Tenth Doctor	June 2022

==== Series 8: Escape from Reality (2022) ====
No.	Title	Directed by	Written by	Featuring	Released
1	"The Wrath of Medusa"	Scott Handcock	Rochana Patel	Daleks, Medusa, Perseus, Hecate	December 2022
2	"The Shadow Master"	Scott Handcock	Lizzie Hopley	The Shadow	December 2022
3	"The Adventure of the Deceased Doctor"	Scott Handcock	Alfie Shaw	Sherlock Holmes, Dr. Watson	December 2022
4	"The Master of Dorian Gray"	Scott Handcock	David Llewellyn	Dorian Gray	December 2022

==== Series 9: Solitary Confinement (2023) ====
No.	Title	Directed by	Written by	Featuring	Released
1	"The Walls of Absence"	Scott Handcock	James Goss	–	June 2023
2	"The Long Despair"	Scott Handcock	Tim Foley	–	June 2023
3	"The Life and Loves of Mr Alexander Bennett"	Scott Handcock	Alfie Shaw	–	June 2023
4	"The Kicker"	Scott Handcock	Trevor Baxendale	–	June 2023

==== Series 10: Rogue Encounters (2023) ====
No.	Title	Directed by	Written by	Featuring	Released
1	"Runtime"	Scott Handcock	Tim Foley	Daleks	December 2023
2	"Manhunt"	Scott Handcock	Rochana Patel	N/A	December 2023
3	"The Sublime Porte"	Scott Handcock	James Goss	Bilis Manger	December 2023
4	"Alone"	Scott Handcock	Scott Handcock	Professor Yana	December 2023

==== Series 11: Future Phantoms (2024) ====
No.	Title	Directed by	Written by	Featuring	Released
1	"His Close Companions"	Scott Handcock	Jonathan Barnes	TBA	November 2024
2	"The Foxglove Cylinders"	Scott Handcock	James Goss	TBA	November 2024
3	"The Sitter"	Scott Handcock	Lizzie Hopley	TBA	November 2024
4	"Signal and I’ll Come to You"	Scott Handcock	Tim Foley	TBA	November 2024

==== Series 12: His Greatest Trick (2025) ====
No.	Title	Directed by	Written by	Featuring	Released
1	"The Grievance Bureau"	Robert Valentine	Lizzie Hopley	TBA	October 2025
2	"Last Girl Standing"	Robert Valentine	Katherine Armitage	TBA	October 2025
3	"The Worst of All Evils"	Robert Valentine	Ian Winterton	TBA	October 2025
4	"The Blue Shift Ritual"	Robert Valentine	Adam Christopher	TBA	October 2025

==== Series 13: Deeds Without Name (2026) ====
No.	Title	Directed by	Written by	Featuring	Released
1	"The Unstately Home"	Jonathan S Powell	Alison Winter	TBA	October 2026
2	"Dead Man's Pulse"	Jonathan S Powell	Mark Bowsher	TBA	October 2026
3	"The Devil in the Detail"	Jonathan S Powell	David K. Barnes	TBA	October 2026
4	"In His Anecdotage"	Jonathan S Powell	Matthew Sweet	TBA	October 2026

==== Awards and nominations ====
Name of the award ceremony, year presented, category, nominee(s) of the award, and the result of the nomination
Award ceremony	Year	Category	Work(s)	Result	Ref.
BBC Audio Drama Awards	2019	Best Actor	Derek Jacobi (Beneath the Viscoid)	Shortlisted	
Scribe Awards	2019	Best Audio	The Master of Callous	Nominated	

=== Zygon Century (2025–2026) ===
==== Series 1: Infiltration (2025) ====
No.	Title	Directed by	Written by	Featuring	Released
1	"1901: The Unknowing Mirror"	Jonathan S Powell	Jonathan Barnes	Zygons	January 2025
2	"1935: The Miracle of Pendour Cove"	Jonathan S Powell	Lauren Mooney and Stewart Pringle	Zygons	January 2025
3	"1957: Double Agent"	Jonathan S Powell	Trevor Baxendale	Zygons, Second Doctor	January 2025

==== Series 2: Transformation (2026) ====
No.	Title	Directed by	Written by	Featuring	Released
1	"1922: The Black Cadre"	Jonathan S Powell	Jonathan Barnes	Zygons	April 2026
2	"1968: An Incident in Death Valley"	Jonathan S Powell	Lauren Mooney and Stewart Pringle	Zygons, the Master	April 2026
3	"1974: The Caldwell Restitution"	Jonathan S Powell	Ken Bentley	Zygons, Third Doctor	April 2026

== Special releases ==
=== The Churchill Years (2016–2018) ===
The Churchill Years was released from January 2016 through February 2018. It sees the return of Ian McNeice as Winston Churchill from the Eleventh Doctor era.

==== Volume 1 (2016) ====
No.	Title	Directed by	Written by	Featuring	Released
1	"The Oncoming Storm"	Ken Bentley	Phil Mulryne	Ninth Doctor	January 2016
2	"Hounded"	Ken Bentley	Alan Barnes	Tenth Doctor	January 2016
3	"Living History"	Ken Bentley	Justin Richards	Eleventh Doctor, Kazran Sardick	January 2016
4	"The Chartwell Metamorphosis"	Ken Bentley	Ken Bentley	Eleventh Doctor, Lily Arwell	January 2016

==== Volume 2 (2018) ====
No.	Title	Directed by	Written by	Featuring	Released
1	"Young Winston"	Ken Bentley	Paul Morris	Eleventh Doctor, Madame Vastra	February 2018
2	"Human Conflict"	Ken Bentley	Iain McLaughlin	Ninth Doctor	February 2018
3	"I Was Churchill's Double"	Ken Bentley	Alan Barnes	Ninth Doctor	February 2018
4	"Churchill Victorious"	Ken Bentley	Robert Khan and Tom Salinsky	Tenth Doctor	February 2018

=== Donna Noble: Kidnapped! (2020) ===
No.	Title	Directed by	Written by	Featuring	Released
1	"Out of this World"	Barnaby Edwards	Jacqueline Rayner	Sylvia Noble, Natalie Morrison	March 2020
2	"Spinvasion"	Barnaby Edwards	John Dorney	Natalie Morrison	March 2020
3	"The Sorcerer of Albion"	Barnaby Edwards	James Goss	Natalie Morrison	March 2020
4	"The Chiswick Cuckoos"	Barnaby Edwards	Matt Fitton	Sylvia Noble, Natalie Morrison, Josh Carter	March 2020

=== The Eighth of March (2019–present) ===
==== Series 1 (2019) ====
No.	Title	Directed by	Written by	Featuring	Released
1	"Emancipation"	Helen Goldwyn	Lisa McMullin	River Song, Leela	March 2019
2	"The Big Blue Book"	Helen Goldwyn	Lizzie Hopley	Ace, Bernice Summerfield	March 2019
3	"Inside Every Warrior"	Helen Goldwyn	Gemma Langford	Madame Vastra, Jenny Flint, Strax	March 2019
4	"Narcissus"	Helen Goldwyn	Sarah Grochala	Kate Stewart, Osgood	March 2019

==== Series 2: Protectors of Time (2022) ====
No.	Title	Directed by	Written by	Featuring	Released
1	"Stolen Futures"	Louise Jameson	Lizbeth Myles	Romana, K9	March 2022
2	"Prism"	Helen Goldwyn	Abigail Burdess	Lady Christina de Souza, Jenny, Noah	March 2022
3	"Turn of the Tides"	Helen Goldwyn	Nina Millns	Rani Chandra, Jo Jones, Jac	March 2022

==== Series 3: Strange Chemistry (2023) ====
No.	Title	Directed by	Written by	Featuring	Released
1	"A Ghost of Alchemy"	Helen Goldwyn	Louise Jameson	Leela, Fourth Doctor, Marie Curie	March 2023
2	"Fairies at the Bottom of the Garden"	Helen Goldwyn	Karissa Hamilton-Bannis	Missy, Young Amelia Pond	March 2023

=== Jenny – The Doctor's Daughter (2018–present) ===
==== Series 1 (2018) ====
No.	Title	Directed by	Written by	Featuring	Released
1	"Stolen Goods"	Barnaby Edwards	Matt Fitton	Jenny, Noah, COLT-5000, Garundel	June 2018
2	"Prisoner of the Ood"	Barnaby Edwards	John Dorney	Jenny, Noah, Ood	June 2018
3	"Neon Reign"	Barnaby Edwards	Christian Brassington	Jenny, Noah, COLT-5000	June 2018
4	"Zero Space"	Barnaby Edwards	Adrian Poynton	Jenny, Noah, COLT-5000, Tenth Doctor	June 2018

==== Series 2: Still Running (2021) ====
No.	Title	Directed by	Written by	Featuring	Released
1	"Inside the Maldovarium"	Barnaby Kay	Adrian Poynton	Jenny, Noah, Dorium Maldovar	November 2021
2	"Altered Status"	Barnaby Kay	Christian Brassington & Matt Fitton	Jenny, Noah, Cybermen	November 2021
3	"Calamity Jenny"	Barnaby Kay	John Dorney	Jenny, Noah	November 2021
4	"Her Own Worst Enemy"	Barnaby Kay	Lisa McMullin	Jenny, Noah	November 2021

==== Series 3: Saving Time (2024) ====
No.	Title	Directed by	Written by	Featuring	Released
1	"Florence O'Connor and the Sandwich of Doom"	Bethany Weimers	John Dorney	Jenny, Noah	October 2024
2	"A Beginner's Guide to Monsters (and How to Slay Them)"	Bethany Weimers	Rochana Patel	Jenny, Noah	October 2024
3	"Genesis of the Humans"	Bethany Weimers	Adrian Poynton	Jenny, Noah, Dorium Maldovar	October 2024
4	"Reboot"	Bethany Weimers	Lizzie Hopley	Jenny, Noah, Jexabel Glyce	October 2024

==== Series 4: Zero Chill (2027) ====
No.	Title	Directed by	Written by	Featuring	Released
1	"Relax"	Lisa Bowerman	Adrian Poynton	Jenny, Noah, Jexabel Glyce	June 2027
2	"Dancing in the Dark"	Lisa Bowerman	Daisy Aitkens	Jenny, Noah, Jexabel Glyce	June 2027
3	"Fast and Fuming"	Lisa Bowerman	Lisa McMullin	Jenny, Noah, Jexabel Glyce	June 2027

=== Lady Christina (2018–2021) ===
==== Series 1 (2018) ====
No.	Title	Directed by	Written by	Featuring	Released
1	"It Takes a Thief"	Helen Goldwyn	John Dorney	–	August 2018
2	"Skin Deep"	Helen Goldwyn	James Goss	Sylvia Noble	August 2018
3	"Portrait of a Lady"	Helen Goldwyn	Tim Dawson	UNIT, Sontarans	August 2018
4	"Death on the Mile"	Helen Goldwyn	Donald McLeary	UNIT, Slitheen	August 2018

==== Series 2 (2021) ====
No.	Title	Directed by	Written by	Featuring	Released
1	"The Wreck"	Helen Goldwyn	James Goss	-	July 2021
2	"Walkabout"	Helen Goldwyn	Sarah Grochala	UNIT	July 2021
3	"Long Shot"	Helen Goldwyn	John Dorney	UNIT	July 2021

=== The Lone Centurion (2021–2022) ===
==== Volume 1 (2021) ====
No.	Title	Directed by	Written by	Featuring	Released
1	"Gladiator"	Scott Handcock	David Llewellyn	Rory Williams	April 2021
2	"The Unwilling Assassin"	Scott Handcock	Sarah Ward	Rory	April 2021
3	"I, Rorius"	Scott Handcock	Jacqueline Rayner	Rory	April 2021

==== Volume 2: Camelot (2022) ====
No.	Title	Directed by	Written by	Featuring	Released
1	"The Once and Future Nurse"	Scott Handcock	Alfie Shaw	Rory, Lancelot, Merlin	February 2022
2	"The Glowing Warrior"	Scott Handcock	Tim Foley	Rory, Lancelot	February 2022
3	"The Last King of Camelot"	Scott Handcock	Kate Thorman	Rory, Merlin	February 2022

=== Master! (2021–present) ===
==== Series 1 (2021) ====
No.	Title	Directed by	Written by	Featuring	Released
1	"Faustian"	Jamie Anderson	Robert Valentine	Lilla Kreeg	March 2021
2	"Prey"	Jason Haigh-Ellery	Robert Whitelock	Vienna Salvatori, Lilla Kreeg	March 2021
3	"Vengeance"	Jamie Anderson	Matt Fitton	Vienna Salvatori, Lilla Kreeg, Daleks	March 2021

==== Series 2: Nemesis Express (2022) ====
No.	Title	Directed by	Written by	Featuring	Released
1	"Nemesis Express"	Jason Haigh-Ellery and Barnaby Kay	Robert Whitelock	Vienna Salvatori, Passion	October 2022
2	"Capture the Chronovore!"	Jason Haigh-Ellery and Barnaby Kay	Lizbeth Myles	Vienna Salvatori, Passion, Chronovore	October 2022
3	"Passion"	Jason Haigh-Ellery and Barnaby Kay	Robert Valentine	Vienna Salvatori, Passion	October 2022

==== Series 3: Planet Doom (2024) ====
No.	Title	Directed by	Written by	Featuring	Released
1	"Basilisk"	Jason Haigh-Ellery and Barnaby Kay	Robert Whitelock	Vienna Salvatori	February 2024
2	"Axos Rising"	Jason Haigh-Ellery and Barnaby Kay	Barnaby Kay	Vienna Salvatori, Axons	February 2024
3	"Hellbound"	Jason Haigh-Ellery and Barnaby Kay	Robert Valentine	Vienna Salvatori, Axons	February 2024

=== Masterful (2021) ===
No.	Title	Directed by	Written by	Featuring	Released
1	"Masterful"	Ken Bentley	James Goss	Nine incarnations of The Master, Kamelion, Jo Grant	January 2021
2	"Short Trips: I Am the Master"	Lisa Bowerman	Geoffrey Beevers	Beevers Master, Fourth Doctor	January 2021
3	"Short Trips: The Switching"	Nicholas Briggs	Simon Guerrier	Delgado Master, Third Doctor, Jo, the Brig, Yates, Benton	January 2021
4	"Terror of the Master"	Jon Culshaw	Trevor Baxendale	Third Doctor, the Master, UNIT	January 2021

=== Rani Takes on the World (2023) ===
==== Volume 1: Beyond Bannerman Road (2023) ====
No.	Title	Directed by	Written by	Featuring	Released
1	"Here Today"	Helen Goldwyn	Joseph Lidster	Rani Chandra, Clyde Langer	April 2023
2	"Destination: Wedding"	Helen Goldwyn	James Goss	Rani, Gita Chandra	April 2023
3	"The Witching Tree"	Helen Goldwyn	Lizzie Hopley	Rani, Clyde, Tyler Steele	April 2023

==== Volume 2: The Revenge of Wormwood (2023) ====
No.	Title	Directed by	Written by	Featuring	Released
1	"Time Schisms!"	Helen Goldwyn	Lizbeth Myles	Rani, Clyde, Luke Smith, Mrs Wormwood	December 2023
2	"The Star-Crossed Diversion"	Helen Goldwyn	Alison Winter	Rani, Clyde, the Bane	December 2023
3	"The Ghost of Bannerman Road"	Helen Goldwyn	Jonathan Morris	Rani, Clyde, Luke, Mrs Wormwood	December 2023

=== Smith and Sullivan: Reunited (2025) ===
No.	Title	Directed by	Written by	Featuring	Released
1	"The Caller"	Jonathan S Powell	Tim Foley	Sarah Jane Smith, Harry Sullivan, K9	June 2025
2	"Union of the Snake"	Jonathan S Powell	Roland Moore	Sarah Jane Smith, Harry Sullivan, K9	June 2025
3	"Blood Type"	Jonathan S Powell	Simon Guerrier	Sarah Jane Smith, Harry Sullivan, K9	June 2025

=== Space Security Service (2025–present) ===
==== Series 1: The Voord in London (2025) ====
No.	Title	Directed by	Written by	Featuring	Released
1	"The Voord in London"	Jonathan S Powell	LR Hay	Anya Kingdom, Mark Seven, the Voord	June 2025
2	"The Thal from G.R.A.C.E."	Jonathan S Powell	Felicia Barker	Anya Kingdom, Mark Seven, Thals	June 2025
3	"Allegiance"	Jonathan S Powell	Angus Dunican	Anya Kingdom, Mark Seven	June 2025

==== Series 2: Bret Vyon Lives! (2026) ====
No.	Title	Directed by	Written by	Featuring	Released
1	"The Man Inside"	Barnaby Kay	Simon Guerrier	Anya Kingdom, Daleks	July 2026
2	"The Wages of Death"	Barnaby Kay	David Llewellyn	Anya Kingdom, Mark Seven	July 2026
3	"The Sky is for Sale"	Barnaby Kay	James Kettle	Anya Kingdom	July 2026

=== Tales from New Earth (2018) ===
No.	Title	Directed by	Written by	Featuring	Released
1	"Escape from New New York"	Helen Goldwyn	Roy Gill	Devon, Hame	March 2018
2	"Death in the New Forest"	Helen Goldwyn	Roland Moore	Tenth Doctor, Devon, Sapling Vale	March 2018
3	"The Skies of New Earth"	Helen Goldwyn	Paul Morris	Tenth Doctor, Devon	March 2018
4	"The Cats of New Cairo"	Helen Goldwyn	Matt Fitton	Tenth Doctor, Devon, Hame	March 2018

=== Time War: Daleks vs Cybermen (2027) ===
No.	Title	Directed by	Written by	Featuring	Released
1	"Mission Parameters"	TBD	Nicholas Briggs	Daleks, Cybermen, War Doctor	March 2027
2	"Love Story"	TBD	Nicholas Briggs	Daleks, Cybermen, War Doctor	March 2027
3	"Dalek War Doctor"	TBD	Nicholas Briggs	Daleks, Cybermen, War Doctor	March 2027
4	"Activation"	TBD	Nicholas Briggs	Daleks, Cybermen, War Doctor	March 2027

=== The Worlds of Doctor Who (2014) ===
No.	Title	Directed by	Written by	Featuring	Released
1	"Mind Games"	Ken Bentley and Lisa Bowerman	Justin Richards	Jago & Litefoot	September 2014
2	"The Reesinger Process"	Ken Bentley and Lisa Bowerman	Justin Richards	Counter-Measures	September 2014
3	"The Screaming Skull"	Ken Bentley and Lisa Bowerman	Jonathan Morris	UNIT, Mike Yates	September 2014
4	"Second Sight"	Ken Bentley and Lisa Bowerman	Nick Wallace and Justin Richards	Sixth Doctor, Romana II, Leela	September 2014

=== The Year of Martha Jones (2021) ===
No.	Title	Directed by	Written by	Featuring	Released
1	"The Last Diner"	Scott Handcock	James Goss	Martha Jones, Francine Jones, Toclafane	December 2021
2	"Silver Medal"	Scott Handcock	Tim Foley	Martha Jones, Francine Jones, Toclafane	December 2021
3	"Deceived"	Scott Handcock	Matt Fitton	Martha Jones, Francine Jones, Toclafane	December 2021

== Other ranges ==
These ranges are related to Doctor Who, but are listed separately from The Worlds of Doctor Who.

=== Bernice Summerfield (1998–2018) ===
==== Season 1 (1998–2000) ====
No.	Title	Directed by	Written by	Featuring	Released
1	"Oh No It Isn't!"	Nicholas Briggs	Paul Cornell	Wolsey, Grel	September 1998
2	"Beyond the Sun"	Gary Russell	Matt Jones	Jason Kane	September 1998
3	"Walking to Babylon"	Gary Russell	Kate Orman	Jason Kane, John Lafayette	November 1998
4	"Birthright"	Nicholas Briggs	Nigel Robinson	Jason Kane, John Lafayette	February 1999
5	"Just War"	Nicholas Briggs	Lance Parkin	Jason Kane	August 1999
6	"Dragons' Wrath"	Edward Salt	Justin Richards	–	September 2000

==== Season 2 (2000–2001) ====
No.	Title	Directed by	Written by	Featuring	Released
1	"The Secret of Cassandra"	Gary Russell	David Bailey	–	December 2000
2	"The Stone's Lament"	Ed Salt	Mike Tucker	Adrian	May 2001
3	"The Extinction Event"	Gary Russell	Lance Parkin	Brax	July 2001
4	"The Skymines of Karthos"	Ed Salt	David Bailey	Brax	September 2001

==== Season 3 (2002–2003) ====
No.	Title	Directed by	Written by	Featuring	Released
1	"The Greatest Shop in the Galaxy"	Alistair Lock	Paul Ebbs	Joseph	February 2002
2	"The Green-Eyed Monsters"	Gary Russell	Dave Stone	Jason, Adrian, Peter	June 2002
–	"The Plague Herds of Excelis"	John Ainsworth	Stephen Cole	Iris Wildthyme	July 2002
3	"The Dance of the Dead"	Edward Salt	Stephen Cole	Ice Warriors	October 2002
4	"The Mirror Effect"	Gary Russell	Stewart Sheargold	Brax, Jason, Adrian, Joseph	March 2003

==== Season 4 (2003–2004) ====
No.	Title	Directed by	Written by	Featuring	Released
1	"The Bellotron Incident"	Gary Russell	Mike Tucker	Bev, Brax, Joseph, Rutans	April 2003
2	"The Draconian Rage"	Edward Salt	Trevor Baxendale	Brax, Draconians	August 2003
3	"The Poison Seas"	Edward Salt	David Bailey	Brax, Sea Devils	September 2003
4	"Death and the Daleks"	Gary Russell	Paul Cornell	Brax, Jason, Adrian, Joseph, Bev, Isaac, Fifth Axis, Daleks	January 2004

==== Season 5 (2004–2005) ====
No.	Title	Directed by	Written by	Featuring	Released
1	"The Grel Escape"	Gary Russell	Jacqueline Rayner	Jason, Peter, Joseph, The Grel	July 2004
2	"The Bone of Contention"	Edward Salt	Simon A. Forward	The Galyari	August 2004
3	"The Relics of Jegg-Sau"	Edward Salt	Stephen Cole	K1	November 2004
4	"The Masquerade of Death"	John Ainsworth	Stewart Sheargold	Adrian	March 2005

==== Season 6 (2005–2006) ====
No.	Title	Directed by	Written by	Featuring	Released
1	"The Heart's Desire"	Gary Russell	David Bailey & Neil Corry	Eternals	June 2005
2	"The Kingdom of the Blind"	Gary Russell	Jacqueline Rayner	Jason, Monoids	July 2005
3	"The Lost Museum"	Gary Russell	Simon Guerrier	Jason	September 2005
4	"The Goddess Quandary"	Gary Russell	Andy Russell	Keri	February 2006
5	"The Crystal of Cantus"	Gary Russell	Joseph Lidster	Brax, Jason, Joseph, Peter	June 2006

==== Season 7 (2006) ====
No.	Title	Directed by	Written by	Featuring	Released
1	"The Tartarus Gate"	Gary Russell	Stewart Sheargold	Jason, Joseph	July 2006
2	"Timeless Passages"	Gary Russell	Daniel O'Mahony	–	August 2006
3	"The Worst Thing in the World"	Ed Salt	Dave Stone	Jason	September 2006
4	"Summer of Love"	Ed Salt	Simon Guerrier	Jason, Bev, Adrian, Doggles, Joseph, Hass	October 2006
5	"The Oracle of Delphi"	Ed Salt	Scott Handcock	Jason	November 2006
6	"The Empire State"	Ed Salt	Eddie Robson	Jason, Maggie, Brax	December 2006

==== Season 8 (2007–2008) ====
No.	Title	Directed by	Written by	Featuring	Released
1	"The Tub Full of Cats"	Ed Salt	Daniel O'Mahony	Maggie, Brax, the Mim	February 2007
2	"The Judas Gift"	Ed Salt	Nick Wallace	Bev, Adrian, Brax, Doggles, Joseph, Hass, the Mim, Draconians	April 2007
3	"Freedom of Information"	Ed Salt	Eddie Robson	Adrian, Brax, Doggles, Joseph, Hass, Jason, the Mim, Draconians	June 2007
4	"The End of the World"	Lisa Bowerman	Dave Stone	Jason, Brax, Adrian	September 2007
5	"The Final Amendment"	Gary Russell	Joseph Lidster	Kadiatu	October 2007
6	"The Wake"	Gary Russell	Simon Guerrier	Peter, Brax, Adrian, Bev, Doggles, Joseph, Hass	January 2008

==== Season 9 (2008) ====
No.	Title	Directed by	Written by	Featuring	Released
1	"Beyond the Sea"	Toby Longworth	Eddie Robson	Peter	June 2008
2	"The Adolescence of Time"	Lisa Bowerman	Lawrence Miles	Peter	July 2008
3	"The Adventure of the Diogenes Damsel"	Nigel Fairs	Jim Smith	Mycroft, Straxus, Cwejen	August 2008
4	"The Diet of Worms"	Toby Longworth	Matthew Sweet	Peter	September 2008

==== Season 10 (2009) ====
No.	Title	Directed by	Written by	Featuring	Released
1	"Glory Days"	John Ainsworth	Nick Wallace	Peter, Bev, Adrian, Brax	June 2009
2	"Absence"	John Ainsworth	Daniel O'Mahony	Peter	July 2009
3	"Venus Mantrap"	John Ainsworth	Mark Clapham & Lance Parkin	Adrian, Peter	August 2009
4	"Secret Origins"	John Ainsworth	Eddie Robson	Peter, Robyn, Brax	September 2009

==== Season 11 (2010) ====
No.	Title	Directed by	Written by	Featuring	Released
1	"Resurrecting the Past"	John Ainsworth	Eddie Robson	Peter, Brax, Bev, Adrian, Robyn, Doggles, Joseph, Hass	September 2010
2	"Escaping the Future"	John Ainsworth	Eddie Robson	Peter, Brax, Bev, Adrian, Doggles, Joseph, Hass	October 2010
3	"Year Zero"	John Ainsworth	Jonathan Clements	–	November 2010
4	"Dead Man's Switch"	John Ainsworth	John Dorney & Richard Dinnick	–	December 2010

==== Boxset 1: Epoch (2011) ====
No.	Title	Directed by	Written by	Featuring	Released
1	"The Kraken's Lament"	Gary Russell	Mark Wright	Acanthus, Jack	September 2011
2	"The Temple of Questions"	Gary Russell	Jacqueline Rayner	Ruth, Leonidas, Jack, Heskith	September 2011
3	"Private Enemy No. 1"	Gary Russell	Tony Lee	Ruth, Leonidas, Heskith, the Epoch	September 2011
4	"Judgement Day"	Gary Russell	Scott Handcock	Ruth, Jack, the Epoch, Brax	September 2011

==== Boxset 2: Road Trip (2012) ====
No.	Title	Directed by	Written by	Featuring	Released
1	"Brand Management"	Gary Russell	Christopher Cooper	Ruth	February 2012
2	"Bad Habits"	Gary Russell	Simon Barnard and Paul Morris	Ruth	February 2012
3	"Paradise Frost"	Scott Handcock	David Llewellyn	Ruth, Brax, Peter, Jack	February 2012

==== Boxset 3: Legion (2012) ====
No.	Title	Directed by	Written by	Featuring	Released
1	"Vesuvius Falling"	Gary Russell	Tony Lee	Peter, Ruth, Jack, Brax	September 2012
2	"Shades of Gray"	Scott Handcock	Scott Handcock	Ruth, Jack, Dorian	September 2012
3	"Everybody Loves Irving"	Gary Russell	Miles Richardson	Brax, Peter, Ruth, Jack	September 2012

==== Boxset 4: New Frontiers (2013) ====
No.	Title	Directed by	Written by	Featuring	Released
1	"A Handful of Dust"	Gary Russell	Xanna Eve Chown	Peter, Ruth, Jack	April 2013
2	"HMS Surprise"	Scott Handcock	Alexander Vlahos	Peter, Jack	April 2013
3	"The Curse of Fenman"	Gary Russell	Gary Russell	Peter, Ruth, Jack, Brax, Fenman	April 2013

==== Boxset 5: Missing Persons (2013) ====
No.	Title	Directed by	Written by	Featuring	Released
1	"Big Dig"	Gary Russell and Scott Handcock	Hamish Steele	Ruth, Jack, The Epoch	December 2013
2	"The Revenant's Carnival"	Gary Russell and Scott Handcock	Martin Day	Peter	December 2013
3	"The Brimstone Kid"	Gary Russell and Scott Handcock	David Llewellyn	Brax	December 2013
4	"The Winning Side"	Gary Russell and Scott Handcock	James Goss	The Epoch	December 2013
5	"In Living Memory"	Gary Russell and Scott Handcock	Gary Russell and Scott Handcock	Peter, Ruth, Jack, Brax, The Epoch	December 2013

==== Boxset 6: The Story So Far (2018) ====
No.	Title	Directed by	Written by	Featuring	Released
Volume 1
1	"Ever After Happy"	Scott Handcock	James Goss	–	September 2018
2	"The Grel Invasion of Earth"	Scott Handcock	Jacqueline Rayner	Jason Kane, The Grel	September 2018
3	"Braxiatel in Love"	Scott Handcock	Simon Guerrier	Brax	September 2018
Volume 2
1	"Every Dark Thought"	Scott Handcock	Eddie Robson	Valeyard	September 2018
2	"Empress of the Drahvins"	Scott Handcock	David Llewellyn	Drahvins, Ruth	September 2018
3	"The Angel of History"	Scott Handcock	Una McCormack	The Doctor (Unbound)	September 2018

==== Specials (1998–2012) ====
Title	Directed by	Written by	Featuring	Released
Buried Treasures	Jason Haigh-Ellery, Gary Russell	Jacqueline Rayner, Paul Cornell	Keri	August 1999
"Silver Lining"	Gary Russell	Colin Brake	Cybermen	December 2004
"Many Happy Returns"	John Ainsworth, Scott Handcock, Gary Russell	Xanna Eve Chown, Stephen Cole, Paul Cornell, Stephen Fewell, Simon Guerrier, Scott Handcock, Rebecca Levene, Jacqueline Rayner, Justin Richards, Miles Richardson, Eddie Robson, Dave Stone	Joseph, Brax, Adrian, Bev, Peter, Ruth, Jack, Leonidas, Iris, Panda, Seventh Doctor	November 2012

=== Charlotte Pollard (2014–2017) ===
==== Series 1 (2014) ====
No.	Title	Directed by	Written by	Featuring	Released
1	"The Lamentation Cipher"	Nicholas Briggs	Jonathan Barnes	Charley, Robert Buchan, Rogue Viyran, Viyran Commander, Viyrans	May 2014
2	"The Shadow at the Edge of the World"	Nicholas Briggs	Jonathan Barnes	Charley, Viyrans	May 2014
3	"The Fall of the House of Pollard"	Nicholas Briggs	Matt Fitton	Charley, Richard Pollard, Louisa Pollard, Viyrans	May 2014
4	"The Viyran Solution"	Nicholas Briggs	Matt Fitton	Charley, Robert Buchan, Rogue Viyran, Viyran Commander, Viyrans	May 2014

==== Series 2 (2017) ====
No.	Title	Directed by	Written by	Featuring	Released
1	"Embankment Station"	Nicholas Briggs	Nicholas Briggs	Charley, Robert, Rogue Viyran, Identical Men	March 2017
2	"Ruffling"	Nicholas Briggs	Nicholas Briggs	Charley, Robert, Rogue Viyran, Identical Men	March 2017
3	"Seed of Chaos"	Nicholas Briggs	Nicholas Briggs	Charley, Robert, Rogue Viyran, Identical Men	March 2017
4	"The Destructive Quality of Life"	Nicholas Briggs	Nicholas Briggs	Charley, Robert, Rogue Viyran, Proto-Viyrans	March 2017

=== Graceless (2010–2017) ===
==== Series 1 (2010) ====
No.	Title	Directed by	Written by	Featuring	Released
1	"The Sphere"	Lisa Bowerman	Simon Guerrier	Abby, Zara, Marek	November 2010
2	"The Fog"	Lisa Bowerman	Simon Guerrier	Abby, Zara, Marek	November 2010
3	"The End"	Lisa Bowerman	Simon Guerrier	Abby, Zara, Marek, Persephone	November 2010

==== Series 2 (2012) ====
No.	Title	Directed by	Written by	Featuring	Released
1	"The Line"	Lisa Bowerman	Simon Guerrier	Abby, Zara, Marek	January 2012
2	"The Flood"	Lisa Bowerman	Simon Guerrier	Abby, Zara, Persephone	January 2012
3	"The Dark"	Lisa Bowerman	Simon Guerrier	Abby, Zara, Persephone, Marek	January 2012

==== Series 3 (2013) ====
No.	Title	Directed by	Written by	Featuring	Released
1	"The Edge"	Lisa Bowerman	Simon Guerrier	Abby, Zara	June 2013
2	"The Battle"	Lisa Bowerman	Simon Guerrier	Abby, Zara	June 2013
3	"Consequences"	Lisa Bowerman	Simon Guerrier	Abby, Zara, Marek	June 2013

==== Series 4 (2017) ====
No.	Title	Directed by	Written by	Featuring	Released
1	"The Bomb"	Lisa Bowerman	Simon Guerrier	Amy, Joy	January 2017
2	"The Room"	Lisa Bowerman	Simon Guerrier	Abby, Zara	January 2017
3	"The Ward"	Lisa Bowerman	Simon Guerrier	Abby, Zara	January 2017
4	"The Dance"	Lisa Bowerman	Simon Guerrier	Abby, Zara	January 2017

=== Iris Wildthyme (2005–2015) ===
==== Series 1 (2005) ====
No.	Title	Directed by	Written by	Featuring	Released
1	"Wildthyme at Large"	Gary Russell	Paul Magrs	Tom, Panda	November 2005
2	"The Devil in Ms Wildthyme"	Gary Russell	Stephen Cole	Tom, Panda	December 2005

==== Series 2 (2009) ====
No.	Title	Directed by	Written by	Featuring	Released
1	"The Sound of Fear"	Gary Russell	Mark Michalowski	Panda	February 2009
2	"Land of Wonder"	Gary Russell	Paul Magrs	Panda	March 2009
3	"The Two Irises"	Gary Russell	Simon Guerrier	Panda	April 2009
4	"The Panda Invasion"	Gary Russell	Mark Magrs	Panda	May 2009

==== Special (2009) ====
No.	Title	Directed by	Written by	Featuring	Released
–	"The Claws of Santa"	Gary Russell	Cavan Scott & Mark Wright	Panda, Mary	November 2009

==== Series 3 (2012) ====
No.	Title	Directed by	Written by	Featuring	Released
1	"The Iris Wildthyme Appreciation Society"	Gary Russell	Cavan Scott	Panda	August 2012
2	"Iris Rides Out"	Gary Russell	Guy Adams	Panda	August 2012
3	"Midwinter Murders"	Gary Russell	George Mann	Panda	August 2012

==== Series 4 (2013) ====
No.	Title	Directed by	Written by	Featuring	Released
1	"Whatever Happened to Iris Wildthyme?"	Gary Russell	Cavan Scott & Mark Wright	Panda	August 2013
2	"Iris at the Oche"	Gary Russell	Mark Wright	Panda	August 2013
3	"A Lift in Time"	Gary Russell	David Bryher	Panda	August 2013

==== Wildthyme Reloaded (2015) ====
No.	Title	Directed by	Written by	Featuring	Released
1	"Comeback of the Scorchies"	Scott Handcock	James Goss	Edwin Turner	August 2015
2	"Dark Side"	Scott Handcock	Nick Campbell	Edwin Turner	August 2015
3	"Oracle of the Supermarket"	Scott Handcock	Roy Gill	Edwin Turner	August 2015
4	"Murder at the Abbey"	Scott Handcock	Mark B. Oliver	Edwin Turner	August 2015
5	"The Slots of Giza"	Scott Handcock	Hamish Steele	Edwin Turner	August 2015
6	"High Spirits"	Scott Handcock	Cavan Scott	Edwin Turner	August 2015
7	"An Extraterrestrial Werewolf in Belgium"	Scott Handcock	Scott Handcock	Edwin Turner	August 2015
8	"Looking for a Friend"	Scott Handcock	Paul Magrs	Edwin Turner	August 2015

=== Torchwood (2015–present) ===
==== Monthly Range (2015–2026) ====
===== 2015 =====
No.	Title	Directed by	Written by	Featuring	Released
1	"The Conspiracy"	Scott Handcock	David Llewellyn	Jack Harkness	September 2015
2	"Fall to Earth"	Scott Handcock	James Goss	Ianto Jones	October 2015
3	"Forgotten Lives"	Scott Handcock	Emma Reeves	Gwen Cooper, Rhys Williams	November 2015
4	"One Rule"	Barnaby Edwards	Joseph Lidster	Yvonne Hartman, Gwen Cooper, (Note: Cameo appearance.) Andy Davidson	December 2015

===== 2016 =====
No.	Title	Directed by	Written by	Featuring	Released
5	"Uncanny Valley"	Neil Gardner	David Llewellyn	Jack Harkness	January 2016
6	"More Than This"	Scott Handcock	Guy Adams	Gwen Cooper, Andy Davidson	February 2016
7	"The Victorian Age"	Scott Handcock	AK Benedict	Jack Harkness, Queen Victoria	March 2016
8	"Zone 10"	Scott Handcock	David Llewellyn	Toshiko Sato	April 2016
9	"Ghost Mission"	Scott Handcock	James Goss	Andy Davidson, Norton Folgate	May 2016
10	"Moving Target"	Scott Handcock	Guy Adams	Suzie Costello	June 2016
11	"Broken"	Scott Handcock	Joseph Lidster	Jack Harkness, Ianto Jones	July 2016
12	"Made You Look"	Scott Handcock	Guy Adams	Gwen Cooper, Rhys Williams	August 2016

===== 2017 =====
No.	Title	Directed by	Written by	Featuring	Released
13	"Visiting Hours"	Scott Handcock	David Llewellyn	Rhys Williams, Brenda Williams	March 2017
14	"The Dollhouse"	Lisa Bowerman	Juno Dawson	Marlow Sweet, Charley Du Bujeau, Gabi Martinez	April 2017
15	"Corpse Day"	Scott Handcock	James Goss	Owen Harper, Andy Davidson	May 2017
16	"torchwood_cascade_CDrip.tor"	Scott Handcock	Scott Handcock	Toshiko Sato	June 2017
17	"The Office of Never Was"	Scott Handcock	James Goss	Ianto Jones	July 2017
18	"The Dying Room"	Scott Handcock	Lizzie Hopley	M LeDuc, Herr Grau	August 2017

===== 2018 =====
No.	Title	Directed by	Written by	Featuring	Released
19	"The Death of Captain Jack"	Scott Handcock	David Llewellyn	Jack Harkness, John Hart, Gwen Cooper, Ianto Jones, Rhys Williams, Andy Davidson, Queen Victoria	March 2018
20	"The Last Beacon"	Scott Handcock	Gareth David-Lloyd	Owen Harper, Ianto Jones	April 2018
21	"We Always Get Out Alive"	Scott Handcock	Guy Adams	Gwen Cooper, Rhys Williams	May 2018
22	"Goodbye Piccadilly"	Scott Handcock	James Goss	Andy Davidson, Norton Folgate	June 2018
23	"Instant Karma"	Lisa Bowerman	David Llewellyn, James Goss, Jonathan Morris	Toshiko Sato	July 2018
24	"Deadbeat Escape"	Scott Handcock	James Goss	Bilis Manger	August 2018

===== 2019 =====
No.	Title	Directed by	Written by	Featuring	Released
25	"Night of the Fendahl"	Scott Handcock	Tim Foley	Gwen Cooper, Fendahl	March 2019
26	"The Green Life"	Scott Handcock	David Llewellyn	Jack Harkness, Jo Jones	April 2019
27	"Sync"	Scott Handcock	Lisa McMullin	Suzie Costello, Margaret Blaine	May 2019
28	"Sargasso"	Scott Handcock	Christopher Cooper	Rhys Williams, Autons	June 2019
29	"Serenity"	Scott Handcock	James Moran	Jack Harkness, Ianto Jones	July 2019
30	"The Hope"	Scott Handcock	James Goss	Owen Harper, Andy Davidson	August 2019
31	"The Vigil"	Lisa Bowerman	Lou Morgan	Toshiko Sato	September 2019
32	"Smashed"	Scott Handcock	James Goss	Gwen Cooper	October 2019
33	"Dead Man's Switch"	Scott Handcock	David Llewellyn	Bilis Manger	November 2019
34	"Expectant"	Scott Handcock	Xanna Eve Chown	Jack Harkness, Ianto Jones	December 2019

===== 2020 =====
No.	Title	Directed by	Written by	Featuring	Released
35	"Fortitude"	Lisa Bowerman	James Goss	Queen Victoria	January 2020
36	"Dissected"	Scott Handcock	Tim Foley	Martha Jones, Gwen Cooper	February 2020
37	"Tropical Beach Sounds and Other Relaxing Seascapes #4"	Scott Handcock	Tim Foley	The Voice	April 2020
38	"Iceberg"	Scott Handcock	Grace Knight	Owen Harper	May 2020
39	"Dinner and a Show"	Scott Handcock	Gareth David-Lloyd	Ianto Jones, Toshiko Sato	June 2020
40	"Save Our Souls"	Lisa Bowerman	Scott Handcock	Queen Victoria	July 2020
41	"Red Base"	Lisa Bowerman	James Goss	Andy Davidson	August 2020
42	"Ex Machina"	Scott Handcock	Alfie Shaw	Ianto Jones	September 2020
43	"The Three Monkeys"	Scott Handcock	James Goss	Owen Harper, Andy Davidson	October 2020
44	"Rhys and Ianto's Excellent Barbecue"	Scott Handcock	Tim Foley	Ianto Jones, Rhys Williams	November 2020
45	"The Crown"	Lisa Bowerman	Jonathan Barnes	Queen Victoria	December 2020

===== 2021 =====
No.	Title	Directed by	Written by	Featuring	Released
46	"Coffee"	Scott Handcock	James Goss	Ianto Jones, Andy Davidson	January 2021
47	"Drive"	Lisa Bowerman	David Llewellyn	Toshiko Sato	February 2021
48	"Lease of Life"	Scott Handcock	Aaron Lamont	Owen Harper	March 2021
49	"Gooseberry"	Scott Handcock	James Goss	Owen Harper, Andy Davidson	April 2021
50	"Absent Friends"	Scott Handcock	James Goss	Jack Harkness, Ianto Jones, Tenth Doctor	N/A
51	"The Five People You Kill in Middlesbrough"	Scott Handcock	Yvonne Hartman (Note: Pseudonym for Tracy-Ann Oberman, Tim Foley & James Goss.)	Yvonne Hartman (Note: Parallel Earth variant.)	June 2021
52	"Madam, I'm"	Scott Handcock	James Goss	Norton Folgate, Lizbeth Hayhoe, Adam Smith	July 2021
53	"Empire of Shadows"	Scott Handcock	James Goss	Zachary Cross Flane	August 2021
54	"Curios"	Scott Handcock	James Goss	Bilis Manger	September 2021
55	"The Great Sontaran War"	Lisa Bowerman	James Goss	Ianto Jones, Major Kreg	October 2021
56	"The Red List"	Scott Handcock	James Goss	St John Colchester, Dorothy McShane	November 2021
57	"The Grey Mare"	Lisa Bowerman	Lauren Mooney, Stewart Pringle	Ianto Jones	December 2021

===== 2022 =====
No.	Title	Directed by	Written by	Featuring	Released
58	"Cadoc Point"	Lisa Bowerman	David Llewellyn	Andy Davidson	January 2022
59	"Sonny"	Lisa Bowerman	Lizzie Hopley	Rhys Williams, Brenda Williams	February 2022
50X	"The Black Knight"	Scott Handcock	Lizbeth Myles	Norton Folgate	March 2022
60	"Infidel Places"	Lisa Bowerman	Una McCormack	Queen Victoria	April 2022
61	"War Chest"	Samuel Clemens	Rossa McPhillips	Toshiko Sato	May 2022
62	"Dead Plates"	Lisa Bowerman	David Llewellyn	Bilis Manger	June 2022
63	"Restricted Items Archive: Entries 031-049"	Steven Kavuma	Maddie Wilson	Ianto Jones	July 2022
64	"Suckers"	Lisa Bowerman	Alexander Stewart	Toshiko Sato	August 2022
65X (Note: Released as a free exclusive download.)	"A Postcard from Mr. Colchester"	N/A	James Goss	St John Colchester	September 2022
65	"Death in Venice"	Steven Kavuma	James Goss	St John Colchester, Dorothy McShane	September 2022
66	"SUV"	Lisa Bowerman	Ash Darby	Ianto Jones, Toshiko Sato	October 2022
67	"The Lincolnshire Poacher"	Lisa Bowerman	Lauren Mooney, Stewart Pringle	Ianto Jones	November 2022
68	"The Empire Man"	Lisa Bowerman	Jonathan Barnes	Queen Victoria	December 2022

===== 2023 =====
No.	Title	Directed by	Written by	Featuring	Released
69	"Double – Part 1"	Barnaby Edwards	Guy Adams	Roberta Craven, Autons	January 2023
70	"Double – Part 2"	Barnaby Edwards	Guy Adams	Roberta Craven, Autons	January 2023
71	"The Last Love Song of Suzie Costello"	Steven Kavuma	Rafaella Marcus	Suzie Costello	February 2023
72	"The Thirst Trap"	David O'Mahony	Tom Price	Andy Davidson, Rhys Williams	March 2023
73	"Launch Date"	Lisa Bowerman	Aaron Lamont	Ianto Jones	April 2023
74	"Sigil"	Lisa Bowerman	Ash Darby	Bilis Manger (Note: This story was recorded prior to Murray Melvin's death on April 14, 2023. It was released posthumously.)	August 2023
75	"Dog Hop"	Bethany Weimers	Lauren Mooney, Stewart Pringle	Andy Davidson	September 2023
76	"Odyssey"	Lisa Bowerman	Patrick O’Connor	Ida Scott, Ood	October 2023
77	"Oodunnit"	Bethany Weimers	James Goss	Zachary Cross Flane, Ood	November 2023
78	"Oracle"	Lisa Bowerman	Ash Darby	Danny Bartock, Ood	December 2023

===== 2024 =====
No.	Title	Directed by	Written by	Featuring	Released
79	"Poppet"	Lisa Bowerman	Lauren Mooney, Stewart Pringle	Rhys Williams	January 2024
80X	"Another Postcard from Mr. Colchester"	N/A	James Goss	St John Colchester	February 2024
80	"Sabotage"	Lisa Bowerman	James Goss	St John Colchester, Dorothy McShane	February 2024
81	"Tube Strike"	David O'Mahony	Gareth David-Lloyd	Ianto Jones, Tommy Pierce	March 2024
82	"Missing Molly"	Lisa Bowerman	Gareth David-Lloyd	Ianto Jones	April 2024
83	"Disco"	Lisa Bowerman	Gareth David-Lloyd	Ianto Jones	May 2024
84	"The Restoration of Catherine"	Bethany Weimers	James Goss	Andy Davidson, Norton Folgate	June 2024
85	"Art Decadence"	Scott Handcock	Ash Darby	Sir Reginald Dellafield, A.C. Forster, Mara	July 2024
86	"End Game"	Scott Handcock	Tom Black	Toshiko Sato	August 2024
87	"The Hollow Choir"	Bethany Weimers	Helen Marshall, Malcolm Devlin	Rhys Williams	September 2024
88	"Widdershins"	Lisa Bowerman	Guy Adams	Iain	October 2024
89	"Bad Connection"	David O'Mahony	Aaron Lamont	Suzie Costello, Emlyn Crook	November 2024
90X	"A Christmas Card from Mr Colchester"	N/A	James Goss	St John Colchester	December 2024
90	"Reflect"	Lisa Bowerman	Joseph Lidster	St John Colchester, Dorothy McShane	December 2024

===== 2025 =====
No.	Title	Directed by	Written by	Featuring	Released
91	"Ianto's Inferno"	Lisa Bowerman	Roland Moore	Ianto Jones	January 2025
92	"Inseparable"	Lisa Bowerman	Helen Marshall, Malcolm Devlin	Yvonne Hartman, Tommy Pierce	February 2025
93	"Rictus"	Lisa Bowerman	James Goss	Princess Beatrice, Zygons	March 2025
94	"The Boy Who Never Laughed"	Scott Handcock	Joseph Lidster	Tyler Steele	May 2025
95	"Child Free"	David O'Mahony	Holly Robinson, George Fletcher	Suzie Costello	July 2025
96	"Salvage"	Lisa Bowerman	Gareth David-Lloyd	The SUV	September 2025
97	"The Flawless Man"	David O'Mahony	Lauren Mooney, Stewart Pringle	Andy Davidson	November 2025

===== 2026 =====
No.	Title	Directed by	Written by	Featuring	Released
98	"Everyone's Dead on Floor 3"	Scott Handcock	James Goss	Norton Folgate	January 2026
99	"Curtain"	Scott Handcock	James Goss	Bilis Manger	March 2026
100	"Fare Well"	Scott Handcock	Joseph Lidster	Ianto Jones, Tommy Pierce, Cybermen	May 2026

==== Special releases ====
===== Specials (2016–18) =====
No.	Title	Directed by	Written by	Featuring	Released
1	"The Torchwood Archive"	Scott Handcock	James Goss	Jack, Gwen, Ianto, Toshiko, Suzie, Rhys, Andy, Yvonne, Norton, Colchester, Alex, Queen Victoria	October 2016
2	"Outbreak"	Scott Handcock	Guy Adams, Emma Reeves, AK Benedict	Jack, Gwen, Ianto	November 2016
3	"Believe"	Scott Handcock	Guy Adams	Jack, Gwen, Ianto, Toshiko, Owen	April 2018

===== The Sins of Captain John (2020) =====
No.	Title	Directed by	Written by	Featuring	Released
1	"The Restored"	Scott Handcock	David Llewellyn	John, Jack	January 2020
2	"Escape from Nebazz"	Scott Handcock	David Llewellyn	John, Jack	January 2020
3	"Peach Blossom Heights"	Scott Handcock	David Llewellyn	John, Jack	January 2020
4	"Darker Purposes"	Scott Handcock	David Llewellyn	John, Jack	January 2020

===== Legacy (2027) =====
No.	Title	Directed by	Written by	Featuring	Released
Volume 1: The Living Will Fall
1	"Cornucopia"	Scott Handcock	Tim Foley	Norton, Orr, Colchester, Tyler, Yvonne, Andy, Ng, Dorothy McShane	September 2027
2	"Meet Lonely"	Scott Handcock	James Goss	Norton, Orr, Colchester, Tyler, Yvonne, Andy, Ng, Dorothy McShane	September 2027
3	"Yvonne Hartman's Ultimate Weapon"	Scott Handcock	Gareth David-Lloyd	Norton, Orr, Colchester, Tyler, Yvonne, Andy, Ng, Dorothy McShane	September 2027
4	"The Corn Mother"	Scott Handcock	William Carroll	Norton, Orr, Colchester, Tyler, Yvonne, Andy, Ng, Dorothy McShane	September 2027
5	"Hitler's Last Secret"	Scott Handcock	James Goss	Norton, Orr, Colchester, Tyler, Yvonne, Andy, Ng, Dorothy McShane	September 2027
6	"Pangea"	Scott Handcock	Ash Darby	Norton, Orr, Colchester, Tyler, Yvonne, Andy, Ng, Dorothy McShane	September 2027
Volume 2: The Dead Shall Rise
7	"Roberta's Gone to Iceland"	Scott Handcock	Guy Adams	Colchester, Ianto, Tyler, Roberta Craven, Yvonne, Rhys, Andy, Ng	October 2027
8	"What It Is to Lose"	Scott Handcock	Tim Foley	Colchester, Ianto, Tyler, Roberta Craven, Yvonne, Rhys, Andy, Ng	October 2027
9	"Viking Funeral"	Scott Handcock	Guy Adams	Colchester, Ianto, Tyler, Roberta Craven, Yvonne, Rhys, Andy, Ng	October 2027
10	"Hullaballoo"	Scott Handcock	Ash Darby	Colchester, Ianto, Tyler, Roberta Craven, Yvonne, Rhys, Andy, Ng	October 2027
11	"Torchwood's Last Stand"	Scott Handcock	Patrick O'Connor	Colchester, Ianto, Tyler, Roberta Craven, Yvonne, Rhys, Andy, Ng	October 2027
12	"Rainbow Bridge"	Scott Handcock	James Goss	Colchester, Ianto, Tyler, Roberta Craven, Yvonne, Rhys, Andy, Ng	October 2027

==== Torchwood One ====
===== Series 1: Before the Fall (2017) =====
No.	Title	Directed by	Written by	Featuring	Released
1	"New Girl"	Barnaby Edwards	Joseph Lidster	Yvonne, Ianto, Tommy	January 2017
2	"Through the Ruins"	Barnaby Edwards	Jenny T Colgan	Yvonne, Ianto, Tommy	January 2017
3	"Uprising"	Barnaby Edwards	Matt Fitton	Yvonne, Ianto, Tommy	January 2017

===== Series 2: Machines (2018) =====
No.	Title	Directed by	Written by	Featuring	Released
1	"The Law Machines"	Barnaby Edwards	Matt Fitton	Yvonne, Ianto, Tommy	July 2018
2	"Blind Summit"	Barnaby Edwards	Gareth David-Lloyd	Yvonne, Ianto, Tommy	July 2018
3	"9 to 5"	Barnaby Edwards	Tim Foley	Yvonne, Ianto, Tommy	July 2018

===== Series 3: Latter Days (2019) =====
No.	Title	Directed by	Written by	Featuring	Released
1	"Retirement Plan"	Barnaby Edwards	Gareth David-Lloyd	Yvonne, Ianto, Tommy	September 2019
2	"Locker 15"	Barnaby Edwards	Matt Fitton	Yvonne, Ianto, Tommy	September 2019
3	"The Rockery"	Barnaby Edwards	Tim Foley	Yvonne, Ianto, Tommy	September 2019

===== Series 4: Nightmares (2022) =====
No.	Title	Directed by	Written by	Featuring	Released
1	"My Guest Tonight"	Scott Handcock	Tim Foley	Yvonne, Ianto, Tommy	April 2022
2	"Lola"	Scott Handcock	Rochana Patel	Yvonne, Ianto, Tommy	April 2022
3	"Less Majesty"	Scott Handcock	James Goss	Yvonne, Ianto, Tommy	April 2022

===== Series 5: I Hate Mondays (2024) =====
No.	Title	Directed by	Written by	Featuring	Released
1	"Dinner for Yvonne"	Scott Handcock	James Goss (Note: From a story by James Goss and Joseph Lidster.)	Yvonne, Ianto, Tommy	May 2024
2	"By Royal Appointment"	Scott Handcock	James Goss	Yvonne, Ianto, Tommy	May 2024
3	"Nerves"	Scott Handcock	Joseph Lidster	Yvonne, Ianto, Tommy	May 2024

==== The Story Continues ====
===== Series 1: Aliens Among Us (2017–18) =====
No.	Title	Directed by	Written by	Featuring	Released
Part 1
1	"Changes Everything"	Scott Handcock	James Goss	Jack, Gwen/Ng, Rhys, Colchester, Tyler, Orr, Ro-Jedda, Sorvix	August 2017
2	"Aliens & Sex & Chips & Gravy"	Scott Handcock	James Goss	Jack, Gwen/Ng, Rhys, Colchester, Tyler, Orr, Ro-Jedda, Sorvix	August 2017
3	"Orr"	Scott Handcock	Juno Dawson	Jack, Gwen/Ng, Rhys, Colchester, Tyler, Orr, Ro-Jedda, Sorvix	August 2017
4	"Superiority Complex"	Scott Handcock	AK Benedict	Jack, Gwen/Ng, Rhys, Colchester, Tyler, Orr, Ro-Jedda, Sorvix	August 2017
Part 2
5	"Love Rat"	Scott Handcock	Christopher Cooper	Jack, Gwen/Ng, Rhys, Andy, Colchester, Tyler, Orr, Ro-Jedda, Sorvix, Bilis, Yvonne	October 2017
6	"A Kill to a View"	Scott Handcock	Mac Rogers	Jack, Gwen/Ng, Rhys, Andy, Colchester, Tyler, Orr, Ro-Jedda, Sorvix, Bilis, Yvonne	October 2017
7	"Zero Hour"	Scott Handcock	Janine H Jones	Jack, Gwen/Ng, Rhys, Andy, Colchester, Tyler, Orr, Ro-Jedda, Sorvix, Bilis, Yvonne	October 2017
8	"The Empty Hand"	Scott Handcock	Tim Foley	Jack, Gwen/Ng, Rhys, Andy, Colchester, Tyler, Orr, Ro-Jedda, Sorvix, Bilis, Yvonne	October 2017
Part 3
9	"Poker Face"	Scott Handcock	Tim Foley	Jack, Gwen/Ng, Yvonne, Rhys, Andy, Colchester, Tyler, Orr, Ro-Jedda, Sorvix	February 2018
10	"Tagged"	Scott Handcock	Joseph Lidster	Jack, Gwen/Ng, Yvonne, Rhys, Andy, Colchester, Tyler, Orr, Ro-Jedda, Sorvix	February 2018
11	"Escape Room"	Scott Handcock	Helen Goldwyn	Jack, Gwen/Ng, Yvonne, Rhys, Andy, Colchester, Tyler, Orr, Ro-Jedda, Sorvix	February 2018
12	"Herald of the Dawn"	Scott Handcock	James Goss	Jack, Gwen/Ng, Yvonne, Rhys, Andy, Colchester, Tyler, Orr, Ro-Jedda, Sorvix	February 2018

===== Series 2: God Among Us (2018–19) =====
No.	Title	Directed by	Written by	Featuring	Released
Part 1
1	"Future Pain"	Scott Handcock	James Goss	Jack, Yvonne, Gwen, Rhys, Andy, Ng, Colchester, Tyler, Orr, Colin, Norton, Ro-Jedda, God	October 2018
2	"The Man Who Destroyed Torchwood"	Scott Handcock	Guy Adams	Jack, Yvonne, Gwen, Rhys, Andy, Ng, Colchester, Tyler, Orr, Colin, Norton, Ro-Jedda, God	October 2018
3	"See No Evil"	Scott Handcock	John Dorney	Jack, Yvonne, Gwen, Rhys, Andy, Ng, Colchester, Tyler, Orr, Colin, Norton, Ro-Jedda, God	October 2018
4	"Night Watch"	Scott Handcock	Tim Foley	Jack, Yvonne, Gwen, Rhys, Andy, Ng, Colchester, Tyler, Orr, Colin, Norton, Ro-Jedda, God	October 2018
Part 2
5	"Flight 405"	Scott Handcock	Lou Morgan	Jack, Yvonne, Andy, Ng, Colchester, Tyler, Norton, Colin, God, the Committee	February 2019
6	"Hostile Environment"	Scott Handcock	Ash Darby	Jack, Yvonne, Andy, Ng, Colchester, Tyler, Norton, Colin, God, the Committee	February 2019
7	"Another Man's Shoes"	Scott Handcock	Tim Foley	Jack, Yvonne, Andy, Ng, Colchester, Tyler, Norton, Colin, God, the Committee	February 2019
8	"Eye of the Storm"	Scott Handcock	David Llewellyn	Jack, Yvonne, Andy, Ng, Colchester, Tyler, Norton, Colin, God, the Committee	February 2019
Part 3
9	"A Mother's Son"	Scott Handcock	Alexandria Riley	Jack, Yvonne, Andy, Ng, Colchester, Tyler, Orr, Colin, God, the Committee	June 2019
10	"ScrapeJane"	Scott Handcock	Robin Bell	Jack, Yvonne, Andy, Ng, Colchester, Tyler, Orr, Colin, God, the Committee	June 2019
11	"Day Zero"	Scott Handcock	Tim Foley	Jack, Yvonne, Andy, Ng, Colchester, Tyler, Orr, Colin, God, the Committee	June 2019
12	"Thoughts and Prayers"	Scott Handcock	James Goss	Jack, Yvonne, Andy, Ng, Colchester, Tyler, Orr, Colin, God, the Committee	June 2019

===== Series 3: Among Us (2023) =====
No.	Title	Directed by	Written by	Featuring	Released
Part 1
1	"Aliens Next Door"	Scott Handcock	Ash Darby	Ng, Orr	May 2023
2	"Colin Alone"	Scott Handcock	Una McCormack	Colchester, Colin	May 2023
3	"Misty Eyes"	Scott Handcock	Tim Foley	Gwen, Rhys, Ng	May 2023
4	"Moderation"	Scott Handcock	James Goss	Colchester, Tyler	May 2023
Part 2
5	"Propaganda"	Scott Handcock	Ash Darby	Orr	June 2023
6	"At Her Majesty’s Pleasure"	Scott Handcock	Tim Foley	Yvonne, Andy, Tyler	June 2023
7	"Cuckoo"	Scott Handcock	Tim Foley	Bilis Manger, Ianto	June 2023
8	"Pariahs"	Scott Handcock	James Goss	Yvonne, Orr, Colchester, Ng, Tyler	June 2023
Part 3
9	"How I Conquered the World"	David O'Mahony	Tim Foley, Ash Darby & James Goss	Yvonne, Colchester, Orr, Ng, Tyler	July 2023
10	"Doomscroll"	David O'Mahony	Ash Darby	Orr, Colchester, Ng, Tyler	July 2023
11	"Heistland"	David O'Mahony	Tim Foley	Yvonne, Orr, Ng, Tyler, Rhys	July 2023
12	"The Apocalypse Starts at 6pm"	David O'Mahony	James Goss	Yvonne, Colchester, Orr, Ng, Tyler, Rhys	July 2023

==== The Sins of Captain John (2020) ====
No.	Title	Directed by	Written by	Featuring	Released
1	"The Restored"	Scott Handcock	David Llewellyn	John, Jack	January 2020
2	"Escape from Nebazz"	Scott Handcock	David Llewellyn	John, Jack	January 2020
3	"Peach Blossom Heights"	Scott Handcock	David Llewellyn	John, Jack	January 2020
4	"Darker Purposes"	Scott Handcock	David Llewellyn	John, Jack	January 2020

==== Torchwood Soho ====
===== Series 1: Parasite (2020) =====
No.	Title	Directed by	Written by	Featuring	Released
1	"The Man from Room 13"	Scott Handcock	James Goss	Norton, Andy, Lizbeth, Lyme	August 2020
2	"Meet Mr. Lyme"	Scott Handcock	James Goss	Norton, Andy, Lizbeth, Lyme	August 2020
3	"The Mould"	Scott Handcock	James Goss	Norton, Andy, Lizbeth, Lyme	August 2020
4	"The Spread"	Scott Handcock	James Goss	Norton, Andy, Lizbeth, Lyme	August 2020
5	"The Dead Hand"	Scott Handcock	James Goss	Norton, Andy, Lizbeth, Lyme	August 2020
6	"The Liberty of Norton Folgate"	Scott Handcock	James Goss	Norton, Andy, Lizbeth, Lyme	August 2020

===== Series 2: Ashenden (2021) =====
No.	Title	Directed by	Written by	Featuring	Released
1	"Pimlico"	Scott Handcock	James Goss	Norton, Andy, Lizbeth, Lyme	October 2021
2	"O Little Town of Ashenden"	Scott Handcock	James Goss	Norton, Andy, Lizbeth, Lyme	October 2021
3	"The National Health"	Scott Handcock	James Goss	Norton, Andy, Lizbeth, Lyme	October 2021
4	"Rivers of Blood"	Scott Handcock	James Goss	Norton, Andy, Lizbeth, Lyme	October 2021
5	"Now is the Time for All Good Men"	Scott Handcock	James Goss	Norton, Andy, Lizbeth, Lyme	October 2021
6	"The Hour of the Hollow Man"	Scott Handcock	James Goss	Norton, Andy, Lizbeth, Lyme	October 2021

===== Series 3: The Unbegotten (2022) =====
No.	Title	Directed by	Written by	Featuring	Released
1	"A First Breath"	Scott Handcock	James Goss	Norton, Andy, Lizbeth, Lyme	October 2022
2	"The Ghost Wall"	Scott Handcock	James Goss	Norton, Andy, Lizbeth, Lyme	October 2022
3	"The Taken"	Scott Handcock	James Goss	Norton, Andy, Lizbeth, Lyme	October 2022
4	"Afterwards They Came"	Scott Handcock	James Goss	Norton, Andy, Lizbeth, Lyme	October 2022
5	"Confessions"	Scott Handcock	James Goss	Norton, Andy, Lizbeth, Lyme	October 2022
6	"Mandeville Walks"	Scott Handcock	James Goss	Norton, Andy, Lizbeth, Lyme	October 2022

===== Series 4: Ascension (2024) =====
No.	Title	Directed by	Written by	Featuring	Released
1	"Burning Bright"	David O'Mahony	James Goss	Norton, Andy, Lizbeth, Lyme, Armitage	July 2024
2	"Chariot of Fire"	David O'Mahony	James Goss	Norton, Andy, Lizbeth, Lyme, Armitage	July 2024
3	"The Invisible Worm"	David O'Mahony	James Goss	Norton, Andy, Lizbeth, Lyme, Armitage	July 2024
4	"We Have Built Jerusalem"	David O'Mahony	James Goss	Norton, Andy, Lizbeth, Lyme, Armitage	July 2024
5	"Dark Satanic Mills"	David O'Mahony	James Goss	Norton, Andy, Lizbeth, Lyme, Armitage	July 2024
6	"Fearful Symmetry"	David O'Mahony	James Goss	Norton, Andy, Lizbeth, Lyme, Armitage	July 2024

=== Vienna (2013–2018) ===
==== Pilot (2013) ====
No.	Title	Directed by	Written by	Featuring	Released
–	"The Memory Box"	Ken Bentley	Jonathan Morris	McGinnis, Norvelle Spraggot, Mead	February 2013

==== Series 1 (2014) ====
No.	Title	Directed by	Written by	Featuring	Released
1	"Dead Drop"	Ken Bentley	Mark Wright	Kendra Spendlove, Shazarel, Malrick, Crevo Finn, Parsival	February 2014
2	"Bad Faith"	Ken Bentley	Nev Fountain	Kendra Spendlove, Shazarel, Malrick, Crevo Finn, Parsival	February 2014
3	"Deathworld"	Ken Bentley	Jonathan Morris	Kendra Spendlove, Shazarel, Malrick, Crevo Finn, Parsival	February 2014

==== Series 2 (2015) ====
No.	Title	Directed by	Written by	Featuring	Released
1	"Tabula Rasa"	John Ainsworth	James Goss	Jexie Reagan, Valentine, Carlos Van Meyer, Doran Curtis, Kelsey	February 2015
2	"Underworld"	John Ainsworth	Cavan Scott	Jexie Reagan, Valentine, Carlos Van Meyer, Doran Curtis, Kelsey	February 2015
3	"The Vienna Experience"	John Ainsworth	Jonathan Morris	Jexie Reagan, Valentine, Carlos Van Meyer, Doran Curtis, Kelsey	February 2015

==== Series 3 (2016) ====
No.	Title	Directed by	Written by	Featuring	Released
1	"Self Improvement"	Scott Handcock	Ian Potter	Jexie Reagan, Kensington Fox, Drew Mulligan, Jonah Hall, Tom McQueen	February 2016
2	"Big Society"	Scott Handcock	Guy Adams	Jexie Reagan, Kensington Fox, Drew Mulligan, Jonah Hall, Tom McQueen	February 2016
3	"Impossibly Glamorous"	Scott Handcock	Steve Lyons	Jexie Reagan, Kensington Fox, Drew Mulligan, Jonah Hall, Tom McQueen	February 2016

==== Series 4: Retribution (2017) ====
No.	Title	Directed by	Written by	Featuring	Released
1	"Part One"	Scott Handcock	Guy Adams	Jexie Reagan, Mama Val, Sharwell Ness, Ratz	February 2018
2	"Part Two"	Scott Handcock	Guy Adams	Jexie Reagan, Mama Val, Sharwell Ness, Ratz	February 2018
3	"Part Three"	Scott Handcock	Guy Adams	Jexie Reagan, Mama Val, Sharwell Ness, Ratz	February 2018

=== The Worlds of Big Finish (2015) ===
The Worlds of Big Finish was a crossover of several of Big Finish Production's ranges, some related to Doctor Who and some not.

No.	Title	Directed by	Written by	Featuring	Released
1	"The Archive"	Scott Handcock	David Llewellyn	Abby, Zara	May 2015
2	"The Adventure of the Bloomsbury Bomber"	Scott Handcock	David Llewellyn	Sherlock Holmes, Mycroft Holmes	May 2015
3	"The Feast of Magog"	Scott Handcock	David Llewellyn	Dorian Gray	May 2015
4	"Kronos Vad's History of Earth (Vol. 36,379)"	Scott Handcock	David Llewellyn	Iris Wildthyme, Turner	May 2015
5	"The Lady from Callisto Rhys"	Scott Handcock	David Llewellyn	Vienna Salvatori	May 2015
6	"The Phantom Wreck"	Scott Handcock	David Llewellyn	Bernice Summerfield	May 2015

== See also ==
- Big Finish Productions
- Doctor Who spin-offs
