= Short Trips =

Short Trips may refer to:

- BBC Short Trips, a series of three Doctor Who short story collections published by the BBC, or the first book in that series.
- Big Finish Short Trips, a series of 29 Doctor Who short story collections and an audio range both published by Big Finish Productions.
- Short Trips: Indefinable Magic, 2009 book
