= Silver Nemesis =

150 – Silver Nemesis
- Doctor Who serial

Cast
- Doctor: Sylvester McCoy – Seventh Doctor
- Companion: Sophie Aldred – Ace
- Others: Anton Diffring – De Flores; Metin Yenal – Karl; Fiona Walker – Lady Peinforte; Gerard Murphy – Richard Maynard; Leslie French – Mathematician; Martyn Read – Security Guard; Dolores Gray – Mrs Remington; Chris Chering, Symond Lawes – Skinheads; David Banks – Cyber Leader; Mark Hardy – Cyber Lieutenant; Brian Orrell – Cyberman; Courtney Pine, Adrian Read, Ernest Mothle, Frank Tontoh – Jazz Quartet

Production
- Directed by: Chris Clough
- Written by: Kevin Clarke
- Script editor: Andrew Cartmel
- Produced by: John Nathan-Turner
- Executive producer: None
- Music by: Keff McCulloch
- Production code: 7K
- Series: Season 25
- Running time: 3 episodes, 25 minutes each
- First broadcast: 23 November 1988 (UK) 25 November 1988 (New Zealand)
- Last broadcast: 7 December 1988 (UK) 25 November 1988 (New Zealand)

Chronology
← Preceded by The Happiness Patrol	Followed by → The Greatest Show in the Galaxy

Silver Nemesis is the third serial of the 25th season of the British science fiction television series Doctor Who. It was first broadcast in the United Kingdom on BBC1 in three weekly parts from 23 November (the 25th anniversary) to 7 December 1988. In New Zealand, all three parts were broadcast on TVNZ on 25 November.

In the serial, the neo-Nazi De Flores (Anton Diffring), the 17th-century sorceress Lady Peinforte (Fiona Walker), and the Cybermen fight for control of the Nemesis, a statue containing a living metal which crash-landed near Windsor Castle in 1988.

The serial marks the final appearance of the Cybermen in the original run.

== Plot ==
In the Earth year of 1638, the Doctor launched a statue into space that was created by the Lady Peinforte in her likeness. The statue was made of a living metal, validium, that was created by Omega, Rassilon and another unnamed Time Lord as the ultimate defence for Gallifrey. Lady Peinforte, a sorceress, retained possession of a silver arrow from the statue, and using what she believed to be magic took her servant Richard and herself to the year 1988 in pursuit of the statue when it returned to Earth.

In 1988, a neo-Nazi group led by a man named De Flores is on a mission to begin a Fourth Reich. They are in possession of a bow from the statue necessary to complete it and are monitoring its eventual descent back to Earth from an asteroid the Doctor had trapped it in. The Seventh Doctor and Ace are in England, and survive an assassination attempt by two unknown men. The Doctor determines that Earth is in danger when he remembers the statue is due to descend there. This asteroid has been approaching Earth at twenty-five yearly intervals since 1638, leaving a succession of disasters in its wake, and has now crash-landed near Windsor Castle.

At the crash site suffering some suspicious power outages, and evidence to support involvement of a third party, De Flores arrives with his men. Lady Peinforte watches from a distance armed with gold tipped arrows dipped in poison. When the Doctor and Ace arrive, a ship full of Cybermen show up and the three rival groups start to battle one another. Only De Flores and one of his men, as well as Lady Peineforte, Richard, the Doctor and Ace survive. The Doctor seizes the bow, but Peinforte fires an arrow which hits the TARDIS and remains there. The Cyber leader takes control of the statue.

The Doctor and Ace take the TARDIS back to 1638 and retrieve a bag of gold coins after discovering a suspicious chess set with an invisible player. They return to 1988 to destroy the Cybermen's ship. Lady Peinforte, using the arrow, approaches where the Cybermen are in possession of the statue. De Flores makes a deal with the Cyber leader and seizes the arrow from Peinforte. Going back on their deal, the Cyber leader prepares to have De Flores converted to a Cyberman before the Doctor and Ace temporarily unite the statue with the bow, scattering all groups. The "Asteroid" takes off with the statue and the arrow to a nearby hanger, awaiting to be united again.

The Doctor and Ace take the TARDIS to the hanger, where the Doctor unites the statue and gives it instructions to destroy a fleet of Cyber warships that are hiding next to the moon. Using a sling and the gold coins, Ace takes out the Cybermen until only the Cyber leader remains. De Flores and his last man approach the nemesis statue but are killed by the Cyber leader. Peinforte and Richard arrive laying claim to the statue from the Doctor on threat of revealing his secrets, mentioning Gallifrey and the Doctor's mysterious origins. The Doctor ignores this threat as the Cyber leader does not care about these secrets and gives the statue to the Cybermen. The statue wipes out the fleet, but not before Lady Peinforte attempts to seize the statue by merging with it herself.

Finally, the Cyber leader attempts to kill the Doctor only to be killed by Richard using the gold arrow that was recently shot at the TARDIS. The Doctor and Ace then take Richard back to 1638, the destruction of Earth having been averted.

== Production ==
The working titles for this story included The Harbinger and Nemesis. Writer Kevin Clarke, who appears twice in the serial itself playing a tourist at Windsor, discusses the development of the plot on the DVD. He points out that he had seen very little of Doctor Who and that he met the production team without any idea of what his proposed story would be about. He made up a story on the spot in front of producer John Nathan-Turner that the Doctor is literally God, though this was not realised on-screen. The Cybermen were added later at the request of Nathan-Turner, to tie in with the programme's silver anniversary.

=== Locations ===
Permission was refused for filming at Windsor Castle so those scenes were shot at Arundel Castle. According to the DVD commentary, scenes were shot in woodland areas around Arundel Castle, notably the climax of Part Two, when the Doctor and Ace discuss the Cyber-threat while sitting near a fallen tree. The damaged and fallen trees were a result of the Great Storm of 1987 that had caused widespread damage throughout southern England. Scenes at the gas works where The Doctor and Ace meet and combat the Cybermen were filmed on the site that later became the Millennium Dome, now the O_{2}.

=== Cast notes ===
Fiona Walker had appeared in The Keys of Marinus in 1964 as Kala. Leslie French, who plays the Mathematician, had turned down the role of The Doctor in 1963; thus, his casting was another nod to the series' beginnings in this Silver Anniversary story. Anton Diffring's performance in Silver Nemesis was his last before his death in 1989. The production team tried to get Prince Edward involved in the show, but his office politely declined in March 1988; the programme instead used an Elizabeth II look-alike. Nicholas Courtney makes a cameo appearance, conversing with other visitors in the queue to tour Windsor Castle.

== Broadcast and reception ==
Episode	Title	Run time	Original release date	UK viewers (millions)
1	"Part One"	24:31	23 November 1988	6.1
2	"Part Two"	24:12	30 November 1988	5.2
3	"Part Three"	24:36	7 December 1988	5.2

Part One was transmitted on the 25th anniversary of the first episode of Doctor Who. Parts Two and Three were the second and third respectively of the series ever to be premiered outside of the United Kingdom (the first being "The Five Doctors"), shown on 25 November as part of a compilation broadcast of the story on New Zealand's TVNZ, after Part One had shown in the UK but before the other two were transmitted there.

Paul Cornell, Martin Day, and Keith Topping wrote of the serial in The Discontinuity Guide (1995), "A bit of a mess, really. Some passable scenes, but the story lacks pace and character involvement. Its plot is virtually identical to Remembrance of the Daleks only two stories previously." In 2012, Mark Braxton of Radio Times said that the story had "a certain comic-strip effervescence" despite many of the plot points not going well together or missing the mark. DVD Talk's Ian Jane gave Silver Nemesis three out of five stars, describing it as "phoned in" and a remake of Remembrance of the Daleks. However, he felt that the story was still enjoyable due to the chemistry between McCoy and Aldred, as well as the faster pace. SFX reviewer Ian Berriman said that the story was too ambitious, and criticised the Cybermen. Despite this, he noted that the serial still had "a great concept, ... some cool moments, a couple of enjoyably awful puns and one superb character: nutjob Jacobean villainess Lady Peinforte". Alasdair Wilkins of io9 wrote that it is "not an unmitigated disaster, but it's definitely the worst of classic Doctor Who's creative resurgence in its final two seasons". He also felt that the story packed in too many elements and did not do much with the Cybermen. Den of Geek listed the Cybermen's reaction to jazz as one of the "great things in not-so-great [Doctor Who] episodes".

== Commercial releases ==
=== In print ===
Silver Nemesis
- Author: Kevin Clarke
- Cover artist: Alister Pearson
- Series: Doctor Who book: Target novelisations
- Release number: 143
- Publisher: Target Books
- Publication date: 16 November 1989
- ISBN: 0-426-20340-2

A novelisation of this serial, by Kevin Clarke, was published by Target Books in November 1989. The audiobook of the Target novelisation was released by BBC Audio on 6th July 2023 read by David Banks.

=== Home media ===
On 5 April 1993, an extended version of this three-part serial was released on VHS. Apart from featuring footage not shown in the original broadcast, the video included an hour-long documentary made by New Jersey Network during the production of the adventure and featuring interviews with cast and crew. This documentary was not included on the 2010 DVD release due to rights issues. The broadcast version of this serial only was released on DVD as part of a box set with Revenge of the Cybermen on 9 August 2010. The documentary eventually got cleared for release as part of the special features for Silver Nemesis on the season 25 Blu-ray Collection in 2024. Alongside other stories in the season, the set includes extended special editions for each episode with new special effects and some additional footage of cybermats (missing from the original production). A condensed 'ommibus' edition, in the style of televised repeats of earlier serials, is also included.

==== Extended VHS release (1993) ====
Episode No.	Release date	Length
1	5 April 1993	29:07
2	5 April 1993	25:49
3	5 April 1993	29:13

==== Special Edition Blu-ray release (2024) ====
Episode No.	Release date	Length
1	28 October 2024	28:27
2	28 October 2024	26:17
3	28 October 2024	28:56
Omnibus	28 October 2024	53:43
