= Doctor Who season 25 =

1988–89 season of British sci-fi TV series

Doctor Who
- Season 25
- Cover art of the Blu-ray release for the complete season
- Starring: Sylvester McCoy; Sophie Aldred
- No. of stories: 4
- No. of episodes: 14

Release
- Original network: BBC1
- Original release: 5 October 1988 – 4 January 1989

Season chronology
- ← Previous; Season 24 Next → Season 26

The twenty-fifth season of British science fiction television series Doctor Who began on 5 October 1988. It comprised four separate serials, beginning with Remembrance of the Daleks and ending with The Greatest Show in the Galaxy. To mark the 25th anniversary season, producer John Nathan-Turner brought back the Daleks and the Cybermen. The American New Jersey Network also made a special behind-the-scenes documentary called The Making of Doctor Who, which followed the production of the 25th anniversary story Silver Nemesis. Andrew Cartmel script edited the series.

== Development ==
=== Background ===
Season 25 saw script editor Andrew Cartmel, who had joined for the previous season, exert a greater influence on the style of the series. He had watched serials from the Philip Hinchcliffe and Robert Holmes era such as The Seeds of Doom and The Talons of Weng-Chiang in preparation for it and concluded that the series should return to a more serious and dramatic approach. The season also saw the start of a move to explore the Doctor's past; Cartmel had felt that as more of the character's own history, together with the history of the Time Lords, had been revealed, some of the mystery about the Doctor had been lost. As a consequence, together with new writers Ben Aaronovitch and Marc Platt, he began developing the seeds of a new backstory, which would be hinted at throughout the season, that suggested the Doctor to be more powerful than most people were aware of. This concept eventually came to be known as the "Cartmel Masterplan".

A story by Ben Aaronovitch, dubbed Knight Fall, was planned to be in the season. This story concerned privatisation. It was submitted in May 1987; script editor Andrew Cartmel liked some of the concepts, but felt that it was generally inappropriate for Doctor Who and had too many supporting characters. Cartmel encouraged Aaronovitch to pitch more stories, which led to Transit. Transit, however, was eventually replaced by Remembrance of the Daleks.

=== Cartmel Masterplan ===
The Cartmel Masterplan is a fan name for the planned Doctor Who backstory developed primarily by script editor Andrew Cartmel and writers Ben Aaronovitch and Marc Platt, by which they intended to restore some of the mystery of the Doctor's background that had been lost through revelation of the existing backstory. Although hints were dropped in the last two seasons, the proposed revelations never materialised on screen as the programme was not renewed into the 1990s.

Some of the stories during the Seventh Doctor's tenure were intended to deal with the lack of mystery by suggesting that much of what was believed about the Doctor was wrong and that he was a far more powerful and mysterious figure than previously thought. In an untelevised scene in Remembrance of the Daleks (1988), the Doctor stated that he was "far more than just another Time Lord." In Silver Nemesis (1988), lines about the creation of validium and Lady Peinforte knowing the Doctor's secrets were meant to point towards this mystery.

In 2014, Cartmel speculated that the "great secret" Lady Peinforte knew about the Doctor in Silver Nemesis was "perhaps" connected to his name, which during the siege on the Fields of Trenzalore in "The Time of the Doctor" (2013) is said to be what would allow the Time Lords to return to the universe.

The Other was first mentioned explicitly in the novelisation of Remembrance of the Daleks (1990) by Ben Aaronovitch as a shadowy figure in Time Lord history, one of the founding Triumvirate of Time Lord society after the overthrow of the cult of the Pythia that had, until then, dominated Gallifrey. The other two members of the Triumvirate were Rassilon and Omega.

== Casting ==
=== Main cast ===
- Sylvester McCoy as the Seventh Doctor
- Sophie Aldred as Ace

=== Recurring stars ===
- Terry Molloy as Davros

Terry Molloy makes his final appearance as Davros, the Dalek creator (now acting as the Dalek Emperor) in Remembrance of the Daleks.

=== Guest stars ===
John Leeson who previously regularly voiced the robot companion K9 from 1977 to 1978 and 1980–1981, appears as one of the Dalek voices in Remembrance of the Daleks.

David Banks makes his final of four appearances in the series in Silver Nemesis as a Cyber-leader.

== Serials ==
This season was broadcast on Wednesdays.

No. story	No. in season	Serial title	Episode titles	Directed by	Written by	Original release date	Prod. code	UK viewers (millions)	AI
148	1	Remembrance of the Daleks	"Part One"	Andrew Morgan	Ben Aaronovitch	5 October 1988	7H	5.5	68
148	1	Remembrance of the Daleks	"Part Two"	Andrew Morgan	Ben Aaronovitch	12 October 1988	7H	5.8	69
148	1	Remembrance of the Daleks	"Part Three"	Andrew Morgan	Ben Aaronovitch	19 October 1988	7H	5.1	70
148	1	Remembrance of the Daleks	"Part Four"	Andrew Morgan	Ben Aaronovitch	26 October 1988	7H	5.0	72
The Seventh Doctor and Ace arrive in Shoreditch in 1963, where two Dalek factions are fighting: Imperial Daleks on an orbiting mothership, controlling the Coal Hill School, and Renegade Daleks, controlling the junkyard. Both sides seek the Hand of Omega, a Time Lord device the Doctor left on Earth during his first visit to 1963. The Renegades are using a schoolgirl as their eyes and ears. The Renegades find the Hand and Imperial Daleks arrive to seize it from them, defeating them and wiping out all but a Supreme Dalek. The Imperial Daleks take the Hand to the mothership, leaving for their home planet, Skaro. The Doctor establishes communication with the Dalek Emperor, who is really their creator, Davros, who means to destroy the Time Lords. The Doctor mocks him but then feigns fear. Davros launches the Hand, Skaro's sun goes supernova, and Skaro is destroyed along with the mothership. The Hand returns to Gallifrey. The Doctor persuades the Supreme Dalek to relinquish control of the schoolgirl. The Supreme Dalek self-destructs, and the girl screams and faints, but is unharmed. Ace asks the Doctor if tricking Davros was good, to which he responds: "Time will tell".
149	2	The Happiness Patrol	"Part One"	Chris Clough	Graeme Curry	2 November 1988	7L	5.3	67
149	2	The Happiness Patrol	"Part Two"	Chris Clough	Graeme Curry	9 November 1988	7L	4.6	65
149	2	The Happiness Patrol	"Part Three"	Chris Clough	Graeme Curry	16 November 1988	7L	5.3	65
Terra Alpha is under the steel fist of Helen A and her executioner, a sadistic robot made out of sweets called the Kandy Man. Joy is perpetual on Terra Alpha, because to be unhappy invites the wrath of Helen A's crack police force, the Happiness Patrol. Allying themselves with Terra Alpha's oppressed natives, the Pipe People, a former Happiness Patrolwoman named Susan Q and blues player Earl Sigma, the Doctor and Ace must end Helen A's reign of terror.
150	3	Silver Nemesis	"Part One"	Chris Clough	Kevin Clarke	23 November 1988	7K	6.1	71
150	3	Silver Nemesis	"Part Two"	Chris Clough	Kevin Clarke	30 November 1988 (Note: Parts Two and Three of Silver Nemesis were first broadcast in New Zealand on 25 November 1988 as part of a compilation broadcast before their UK transmission.)	7K	5.2	70
150	3	Silver Nemesis	"Part Three"	Chris Clough	Kevin Clarke	7 December 1988	7K	5.2	70
In the year 1638, the Doctor sends into orbit around Earth a statue called Nemesis. It is made of the deadly living validium, which served Gallifrey as its last line of defence. In 1988, the Nemesis statue's orbit decays, it returns to Earth, and is pursued on Earth by three factions: the Cybermen, a Neo-Nazi named De Flores, and the mad, time-travelling Lady Peinforte, The latter faction nearly gained possession of the statue in 1638 and knows the darkest secrets of the Doctor's past.
151	4	The Greatest Show in the Galaxy	"Part One"	Alan Wareing	Stephen Wyatt	14 December 1988	7J	5.0	68
151	4	The Greatest Show in the Galaxy	"Part Two"	Alan Wareing	Stephen Wyatt	21 December 1988	7J	5.3	66
151	4	The Greatest Show in the Galaxy	"Part Three"	Alan Wareing	Stephen Wyatt	28 December 1988	7J	4.8	69
151	4	The Greatest Show in the Galaxy	"Part Four"	Alan Wareing	Stephen Wyatt	4 January 1989	7J	6.6	64
Despite Ace's protestations that she hates clowns, the Doctor takes the TARDIS to Segonax to see the famed Psychic Circus. But there they discover that the self-styled Greatest Show In The Galaxy has become something sinister: its founder, Kingpin, has disappeared; the callous Chief Clown deals violently with anyone who tries to flee; and prospective Circus stars must entertain an enigmatic family – or die. The time travellers learn that the Psychic Circus has fallen under the influence of the evil Gods of Ragnarok, and the Doctor's next performance may be his last.

== Broadcast ==
The entire season was broadcast from 5 October 1988 to 4 January 1989. Transmission moved to Wednesday nights. Season 25 was originally to have The Greatest Show in the Galaxy broadcast second, and Silver Nemesis broadcast last. However, the expected start of the season on 7 September was postponed to 5 October as a result of BBC coverage of the 1988 Summer Olympics in Seoul, South Korea. Nathan-Turner still wanted to lead off the year with Remembrance of the Daleks and have episode one of the twenty-fifth anniversary story, Silver Nemesis, broadcast on 23 November – the actual date of Doctor Who's 25th anniversary. The change of the season's start from 7 September to 5 October meant that the eighth episode of the season rather than the twelfth episode of the season was going to transmit on 23 November. Consequently, the originally intended third broadcast story of the season, The Happiness Patrol, was switched to second, while The Greatest Show in the Galaxy became the last story of the season to be broadcast.

== Home media ==
=== VHS releases ===
Season	Story no.	Serial name	Duration	Release date		
Season	Story no.	Serial name	Duration	UK	Australia	USA / Canada
25	148	Remembrance of the Daleks	4 × 25 min.	September 1993	September 1993	October 1993
25	149	The Happiness Patrol	3 × 25 min.	August 1997	May 1998	March 1998
25	150	Silver Nemesis - Extended Edition	3 × 25 min.	April 1993	June 1993	August 1994
25	151	The Greatest Show in the Galaxy	4 × 25 min.	January 2000	September 1999	November 1999

=== DVD and Blu-ray releases ===
All releases are for DVD unless otherwise indicated:

- ^{(B)} indicates a Blu-ray release

Season	Story no.	Serial name	Duration	Release date		
Season	Story no.	Serial name	Duration	R2	R4	R1
25	148	Remembrance of the Daleks	4 × 25 min.	26 February 2001	8 May 2002	2 April 2002
25	148	Remembrance of the Daleks (Special Edition) (Note: Available individually or in The Complete Davros Collection box set in Regions 2 and 4. Only available individually in Region 1.)	4 × 25 min.	26 November 2007; 20 July 2009 (Note: The Regions 2 and 4 releases of the Special Edition of Remembrance of the Daleks was originally only available as part of The Complete Davros Collection box set, but was later re-released on its own.)	2 June 2008; 1 October 2009 (Note: The Regions 2 and 4 releases of the Special Edition of Remembrance of the Daleks was originally only available as part of The Complete Davros Collection box set, but was later re-released on its own.)	2 March 2010
25	149	The Happiness Patrol (Note: Only available as part of the Ace Adventures box set in Regions 2 and 4. Only available individually in Region 1.)	3 × 25 min.	7 May 2012	7 June 2012	8 May 2012
25	150	Silver Nemesis (Note: Only available as part of the Cybermen box set in Regions 2 and 4. Only available individually in Region 1.)	3 × 25 min.	9 August 2010	7 October 2010	2 November 2010
25	151	The Greatest Show in the Galaxy	4 × 25 min.	30 July 2012	16 August 2012	14 August 2012
25	148–151	Complete Season 25 (Note: Released as Doctor Who: The Collection – Season 25 in Region B.)	14 × 25 min.	21 October 2024 ^{(B)}	18 December 2024 ^{(B)}	25 February 2025 ^{(B)}

== In print ==
Season	Story no.	Library no. (Note: Number in Target's Doctor Who Library, if applicable)	Novelisation title	Author	Paperback release date (Note: Published by Target Books (or by BBC Books under the Target Collection umbrella) unless otherwise indicated)	Audiobook	
Season	Story no.	Library no.	Novelisation title	Author	Paperback release date	Release date (Note: Unabridged from BBC Audio / AudioGo unless otherwise indicated)	Narrator
25	148	148	Remembrance of the Daleks	Ben Aaronovitch	21 June 1990	19 February 2015	Terry Molloy
25	149	146	The Happiness Patrol	Graeme Curry	15 February 1990	2 July 2009	Rula Lenska
25	150	143	Silver Nemesis	Kevin Clarke	16 November 1989	6 July 2023	David Banks
25	151	144	The Greatest Show in the Galaxy	Stephen Wyatt	21 December 1989	1 August 2013	Sophie Aldred
