= Remembrance of the Daleks =

148 – Remembrance of the Daleks
- Doctor Who serial

Cast
- Doctor: Sylvester McCoy – Seventh Doctor
- Companion: Sophie Aldred – Ace
- Others: Terry Molloy – The Emperor Dalek/Davros; Simon Williams – Group Captain Gilmore; Pamela Salem – Professor Rachel Jensen; Karen Gledhill – Allison; Dursley McLinden – Sgt. Mike Smith; George Sewell – Ratcliffe; Harry Fowler – Harry; Jasmine Breaks – The Girl; Joseph Marcell – John; Peter Hamilton Dyer – Embery; Michael Sheard – Headmaster; Peter Halliday – Vicar; William Thomas – Martin; Derek Keller – Kaufman; Hugh Spight, John Scott Martin, Tony Starr, Cy Town – Dalek Operators; Roy Skelton, Royce Mills, Brian Miller, John Leeson – Voices (Note: Leeson voiced the Dalek Battle Computer in Parts 1–3, and Skelton, Mills and Miller voiced the Daleks. An uncredited fourth Dalek voice appears in Parts 3–4.)

Production
- Directed by: Andrew Morgan; John Nathan-Turner (uncredited)
- Written by: Ben Aaronovitch
- Script editor: Andrew Cartmel
- Produced by: John Nathan-Turner
- Executive producer: None
- Music by: Keff McCulloch
- Production code: 7H
- Series: Season 25
- Running time: 4 episodes, 25 minutes each
- First broadcast: 5 October 1988
- Last broadcast: 26 October 1988

Chronology
← Preceded by Dragonfire	Followed by → The Happiness Patrol

Remembrance of the Daleks is the first serial of the 25th season of the British science fiction television series Doctor Who. The serial was first broadcast in four weekly episodes from 5 to 26 October 1988. It was written by Ben Aaronovitch and directed by Andrew Morgan. The serial contains many references to the history of the show, featuring settings from the first Doctor Who episode, An Unearthly Child, such as Coal Hill School and the junkyard at 76 Totter's Lane.

In the serial, alien time traveller the Doctor and his companion Ace travel back to 1963 to retrieve the Hand of Omega, a powerful device created by the Time Lords, and keep it from the Daleks. The serial is the final appearance of the Daleks in the original run and the only occasion in which the Seventh Doctor encountered them on television.

In reader polls conducted by Doctor Who Magazine from 1998 onwards, Remembrance of the Daleks has consistently been voted as one of the greatest Doctor Who stories.

== Plot ==
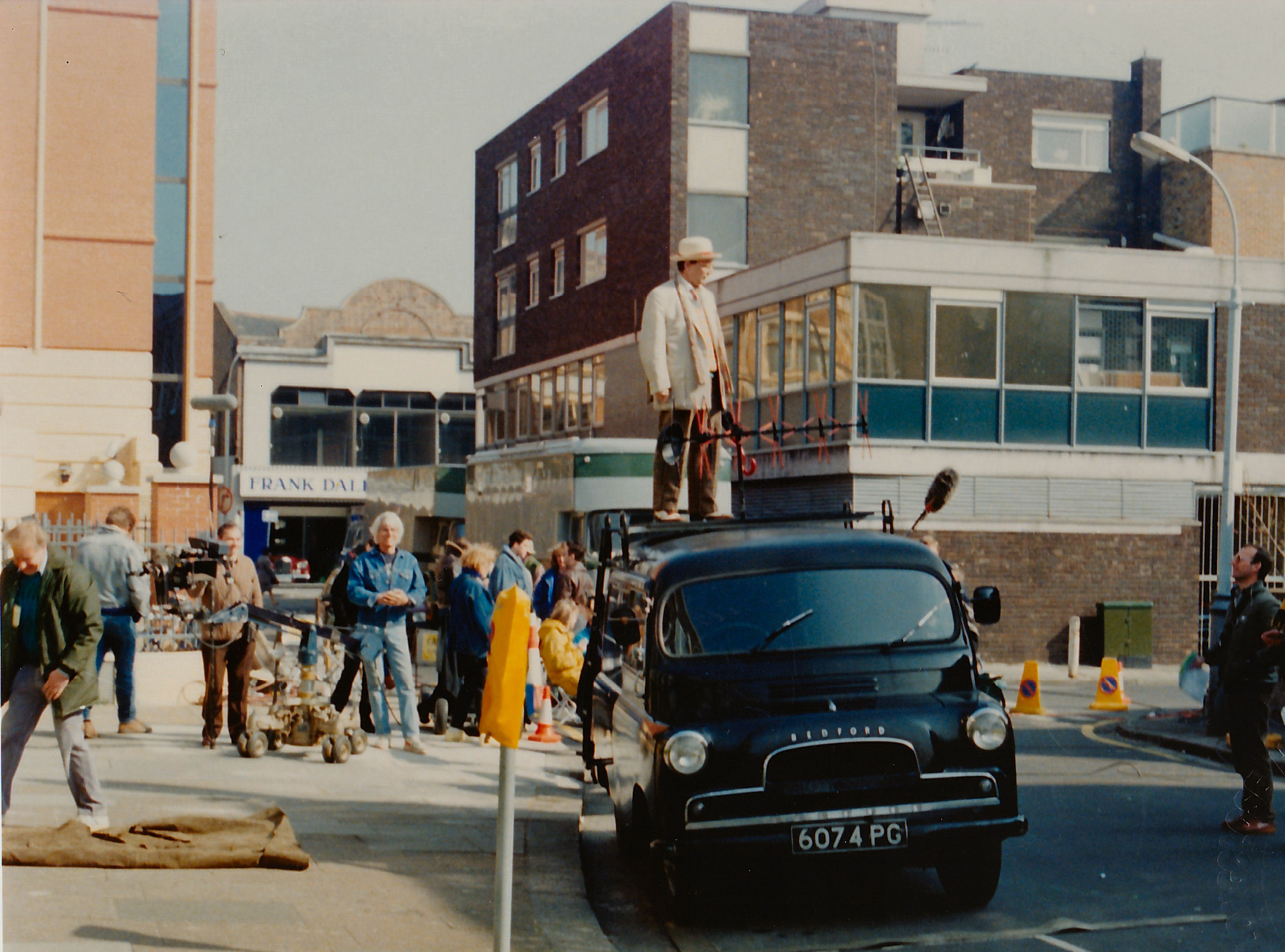
On location during filming of Remembrance of the Daleks

The Seventh Doctor and Ace arrive in Shoreditch in 1963. They meet a military unit led by Group Captain Gilmore and Sergeant Smith, tracking abnormal local magnetic fluctuations, originating mainly from Coal Hill School where a transmat device in its basement is tied to a Dalek ship in geostationary orbit. A second, weaker fluctuation is emitted by a nearby Dalek. There are two Dalek factions: Imperial Daleks on the orbiting mothership, controlling the school, and Renegade Daleks, who reject the Emperor's authority, controlling the junkyard. Both sides seek the Hand of Omega, a Time Lord device the Doctor left on Earth during his first visit to 1963.

Smith is a secret associate of Ratcliffe, leader of a group of fascists, reporting to a Renegade battle computer, which uses a schoolgirl as its eyes and ears. The Doctor has the Hand buried in a local cemetery, but Ratcliffe finds it, tipped off by Smith. Imperial Daleks arrive to seize it from the Renegades, but the Doctor and Ace defeat them and destroy their transmat. Anticipating a siege, the Doctor has Gilmore fortify the school while he disables the Renegade "time controller", fleeing with Daleks in pursuit, returning to the school just as the Imperial Daleks land. The Imperials eventually defeat the Renegades after deploying a Special Weapons Dalek, wiping out all but the Supreme Dalek, allowing Ratcliffe and Smith to escape with the controller, pursued by the schoolgirl, who kills Ratcliffe.

The Imperial Daleks take the Hand to the mothership, leaving for their home planet, Skaro. Ace follows Smith to recover the controller. The Doctor establishes communication with the Dalek Emperor, who is really their creator, Davros, who means to destroy the Time Lords with the Hand. The Doctor mocks him but then feigns fear. Davros launches the Hand, Skaro's sun goes supernova, and Skaro is destroyed, the force of the explosion also destroying the mothership. The Hand returns to Gallifrey, and Davros flees in an escape pod.

Smith captures Ace, but the schoolgirl finds them and kills Smith. The Doctor convinces the Supreme Dalek that it is the last of its species and it has no purpose anymore. The Supreme Dalek self-destructs, and the girl screams and faints, but is still alive. At Smith's funeral, The Doctor and Ace slip away contemplating that time will tell if they "did good".

=== Continuity ===
An undertaker says that he thought the Doctor was supposed to be an "old geezer with white hair", referring to his first incarnation. Coal Hill School and the Totter's Lane junkyard reappear from the very first Doctor Who serial, "An Unearthly Child", although their set designs are not consistent with those in said story.

== Production ==
=== Conception and writing ===
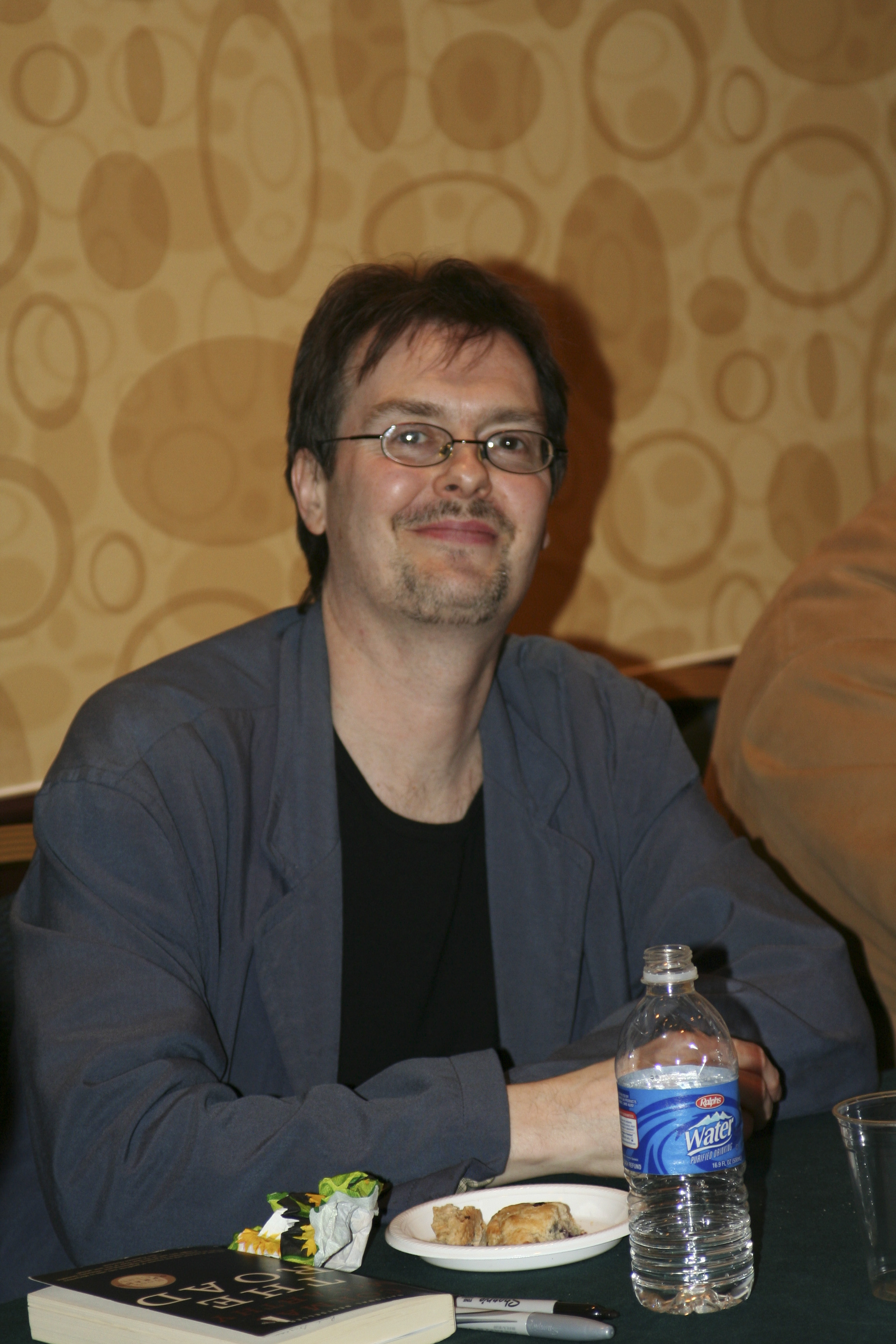
Script editor Andrew Cartmel (pictured) assigned the script to writer Ben Aaronovitch, and intended for the story to show the Doctor as a commanding centre.

Producer John Nathan-Turner wanted to start Doctor Who's twenty-fifth anniversary season "with a bang", a story with the Doctor's most famous adversaries, the Daleks. Nathan-Turner and script editor Andrew Cartmel hired 25 year old Ben Aaronovitch to write the story, who had not written for television before. He initially developed a story idea which later became Battlefield (1989), before Cartmel then commissioned Aaronovitch to write the Dalek story, originally titled Nemesis of the Doctor. According to deals made with Terry Nation, the creator of the Daleks, he had to approve a Dalek story if he was not writing it. Despite initial concerns, the storyline was approved. One of Cartmel's goals with the story was to have the Doctor be a commanding centre, rather than being "pushed and pulled" by the story as he felt had been happening recently. As such, Aaronovitch wanted there to be a spirit of the Doctor just wanting to tackle the Daleks. Two of the first things Aaronovitch thought of when creating the story was the 1963 setting and a Dalek climbing up stairs. He decided to reveal the Daleks in the middle of the first episode instead of as its cliffhanger, and then have a Dalek levitating up stairs to surprise viewers. The inability of Daleks to climb stairs was an urban myth and a joke, with the Doctor even joking about it in Destiny of the Daleks (1979). Remembrance was intended to put it to rest, though Cartmel noted that the joke was still prevalent. The Dalek civil war seen in Remembrance was intended to be an outcome of the previous Dalek story, Revelation of the Daleks (1985). Aaronovitch felt that destroying Skaro at the end seemed like a logical conclusion, but he noted that it might not be the best decision in the long run.

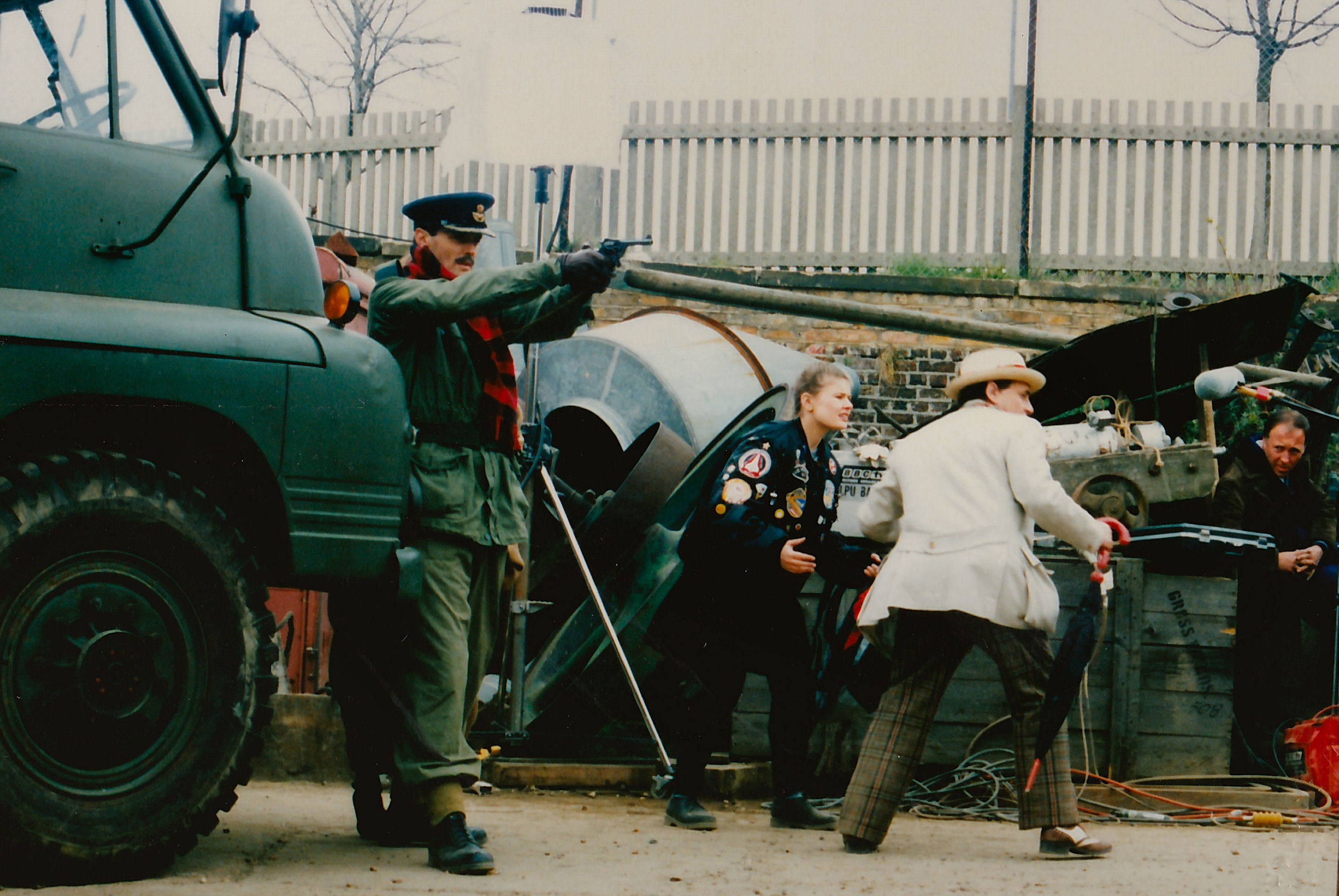
Filming Remembrance on location

Remembrance of the Daleks, the first story in Doctor Who's twenty-fifth anniversary season, contains many references to the series' past, something Aaronovitch felt was fun. It is set in the same time and place as the programme's first episode, "An Unearthly Child", where Coal Hill School employed original companions Ian and Barbara and the Doctor's granddaughter Susan was enrolled. The Totter's Lane junkyard also reappears, as it had in season 22's Attack of the Cybermen, though "I.M. Foreman" is misspelled "I.M. Forman". It originally read "L.M.", though that was changeable in production. In one of the classrooms, Ace picks up a book on the French Revolution just as Susan had in "An Unearthly Child"; Aldred studied the original to try to mimic Carole Ann Ford's stature. The Doctor references the events of The Dalek Invasion of Earth (1964), Genesis of the Daleks (1975), Terror of the Zygons (1975), and The Web of Fear (1968), as well as likening a device to something he used in Planet of the Daleks (1973). The Doctor mistakenly calls Group Captain Gilmore "Brigadier", a reference to Brigadier Lethbridge-Stewart, who had headed UNIT, an organisation similar to Gilmore's. Rachel, a scientific advisor from Cambridge, is similar to Liz Shaw, and she shares a conversation with Gilmore that is reminiscent of a conversation between the Brigadier and Liz in Spearhead from Space (1970). Rachel also bears a physical resemblance to Barbara. Remembrance of the Daleks is also contains a meta-reference; a television continuity announcer says, "This is BBC television, the time is quarter past five and Saturday viewing continues with an adventure in the new science fiction series Doc—", but is cut off by a scene change before completing the title. Aaronovitch "couldn't resist" the reference, and clarified that it was meant as a joke and was not to be taken seriously. Originally, it was intended that the show that was introduced would be called Professor X. Alison and Rachel make mention of a "Bernard" from the "British Rocket Group". This is a reference to Bernard Quatermass and his British Experimental Rocket Group, of the Nigel Kneale-penned Quatermass science-fiction television serials. Several scenes from Remembrance of the Daleks were cut or edited in production. McCoy's favourite scene, in which the Doctor muses to a worker at a café, was cut by about half. As originally shot, Ace defused the tension between her and the Doctor when he left her at the boarding house. Also cut was the Doctor curing Ace's leg at the beginning of the third episode, and the issuing of instructions from the Dalek controller through an earpiece. In a notable deleted line, the Doctor tells Davros that he is "far more than just another Time Lord". This, along with the Doctor's hints that he was present at the creation of the Hand of Omega, was part of the so-called "Cartmel Masterplan" by script editor Andrew Cartmel to restore some of the mystery to the Doctor's origins. However, as the programme ceased production in 1989, the intended revelations never came to pass. The original script also had the Doctor blowing up a Dalek with the anti-tank missile in episode two, but McCoy felt this was out of character and suggested Ace should do it instead.

=== Casting ===
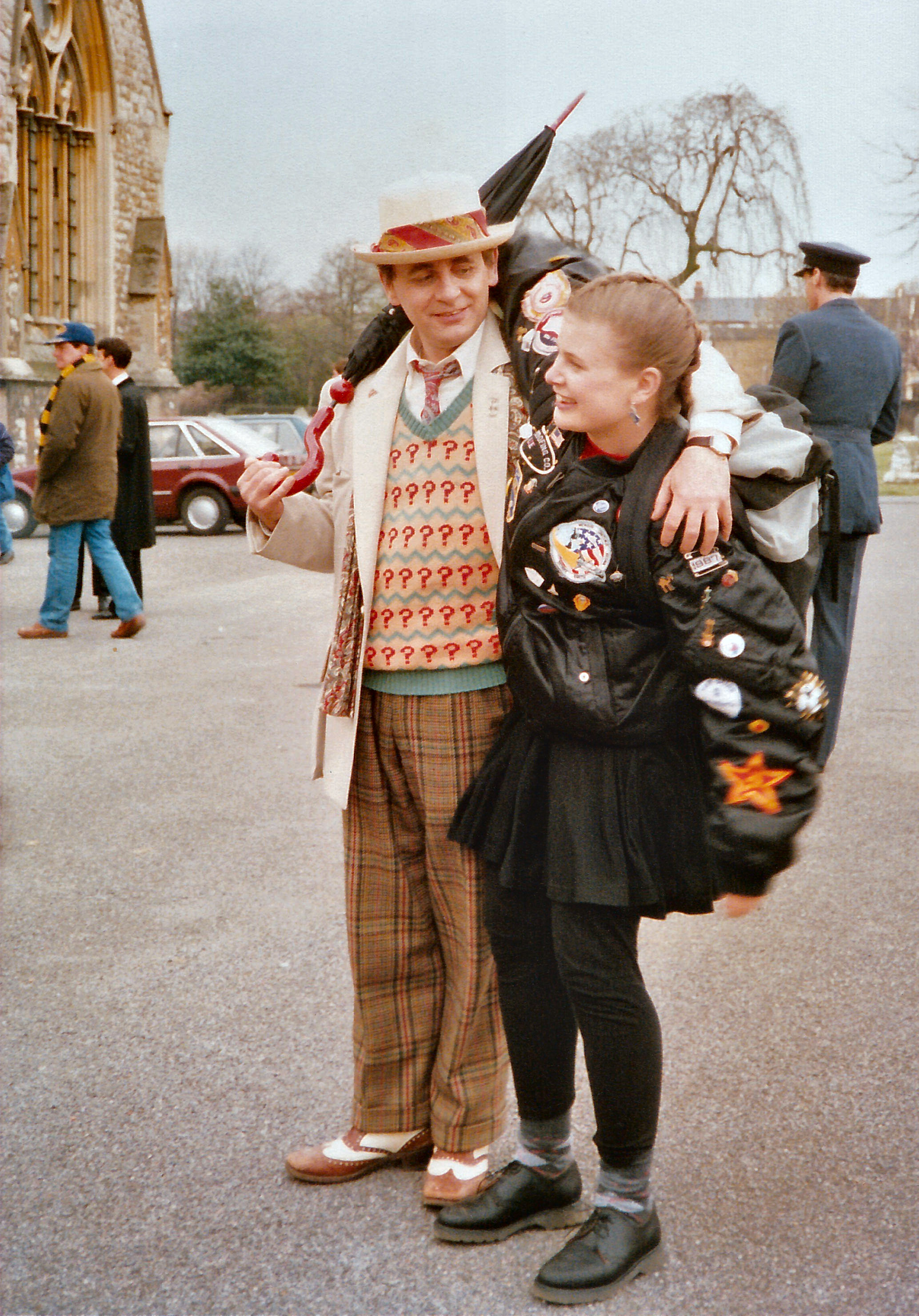
Sylvester McCoy and Sophie Aldred on location

To protect the secret of Davros' presence in the story, Terry Molloy was credited in part three under an anagram, "Roy Tromelly". Ian Ogilvy was approached for the role of Gilmore, but did not accept; Neil Stacy was also considered. The role went to Simon Williams, who was known for his role as James Bellamy in Upstairs, Downstairs. Sophie Aldred and Karen Gledhil, who had watched the programme when they were younger, were awed to work with him. Williams had trouble handling the character's gun and also misunderstood a stage direction in the script describing it, which earned him the nickname of "Chunky". This nickname was carried on into the character, with McCoy adding the line, "...why his men call him 'Chunky' I've no idea."

The computer was voiced by John Leeson, who previously played K-9. Leeson was asked to make his voice sound like Davros', to trick viewers into thinking the computer was Davros, and watched past episodes for reference. Michael Sheard was chosen to play the headmaster as he would be familiar to children. Sheard had to be released from his work on Grange Hill to participate; Peter Tilbury was briefly considered for the role if Sheard could not make it. Sheard had previously appeared in The Ark (1966), The Mind of Evil (1971), Pyramids of Mars (1975), The Invisible Enemy (1977), and Castrovalva (1982). Peter Halliday, who played the blind Vicar, had also appeared in various Doctor Who stories. Stratford Johns, who had previously appeared in Four to Doomsday, was originally considered for Ratcliffe. Mark McGann, the brother of Eighth Doctor actor Paul McGann, was originally considered for the role of Mike Smith. Pamela Salem had roles in two Fourth Doctor serials, as one of the Xoanon voices in The Face of Evil, and as Toos in The Robots of Death (1977). Simon Williams, Karen Gledhill, and Pamela Salem reprised their roles in this serial in an audio spin-off series for Big Finish titled Counter-Measures, which details the adventures of the group after this story.

Remembrance of the Daleks was the first story in which Ace was a regular companion, having joined at the end of Dragonfire. Cartmel worked with Aldred to make Ace different from most companions: less of a "screamer" and more tomboyish. Aldred recalled that taking on the Daleks made her feel like a "real assistant". Aldred did many of her own stunts, bonding with the new stunt coordinator, Tip Tipping. She found the experience "terrifying" at first. Aldred has said that she is proud of the scene where Ace beats up a Dalek with a baseball bat, calling it one of the best things she has done in her life. Aldred was also trained in firing guns for the scene where she shoots a Dalek.

=== Filming and effects ===
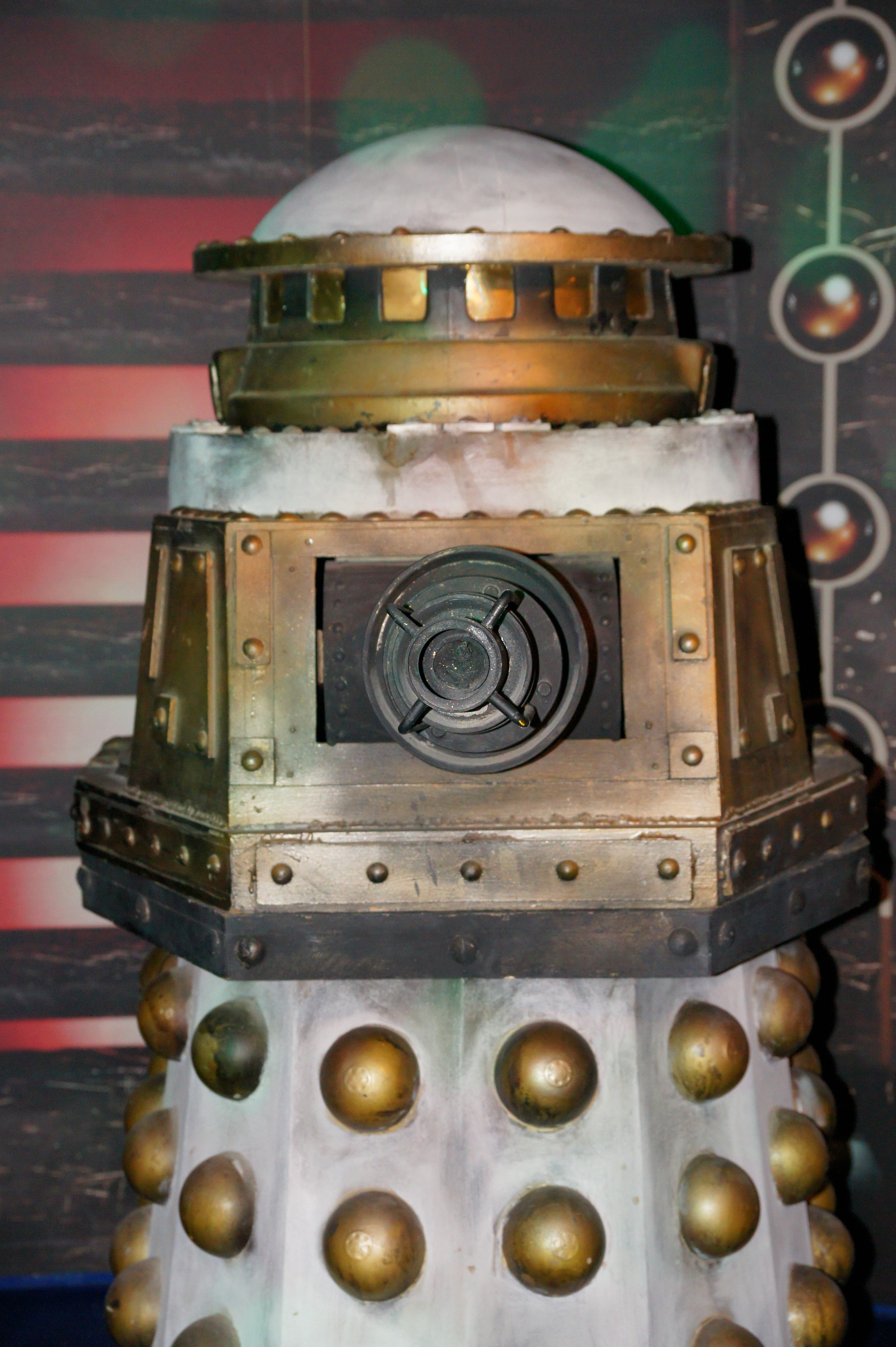
This episode debuted the Special Weapons Dalek, shown here at the Doctor Who Experience

The director, Andrew Morgan, wanted to improve upon his last effort, Time and the Rani (1987). Feeling that the script was worth it, extra money was put into the production. However, production went over-budget by £13,000, and as a result Morgan was barred from directing for the programme again. Filming took place in April 1988. St John's School in Hammersmith was used as Coal Hill School. The Kew Bridge Steam Museum in Brentford was used as the I.M. Forman junkyard. Filming at this location was occasionally interrupted by a radio traffic news helicopter circling overhead. John Nodes Funeral Service in Ladbroke Grove, London was used for the funeral parlour the Doctor retrieves the Hand of Omega from, and the graveyard where he buries the Hand is Willesden Lane Cemetery. The cemetery filming was attended by some Doctor Who fans who came to watch.

For the levitating Dalek, a scaffolding was built over the stairs, and the Dalek prop was placed in a tray that was hoisted up by a rail-mounted trolley. Two of the six Renegade Daleks were reused props from the 1960s. Imperial Daleks were built with bigger wheels that would roll easier on location. Aaronovitch expected the Dalek ship to be cheap-looking and achieved with colour-separation overlay, and was surprised when a model ship was constructed and "landed" with the help of a crane. For the final battle sequence between the Renegade and Imperial Daleks, the BBC Effects Department's pyrotechnics were so loud and the explosions so realistic that the London Fire Brigade was dispatched to the scene by local residents who feared that an IRA bomb had gone off. McCoy recalled that after the first explosions, a number of car alarms in the neighbourhood went off, and the emergency services drivers were surprised when they arrived to see Daleks coming at them from out of the smoke. The junkyard gate was part of ITV's storage facility, and the pyrotechnics not only destroyed it for the effect of the Special Weapons Dalek blowing it up, but also smashed windows in the nearby building. A thermal imaging camera was used for Dalek perspective shots.

=== Post-production ===
The first episode begins with a cold open, the second serial to have a specially-shot pretitles sequence after Time and the Rani (1987), though Castrovalva (1982) began with a reprise of Logopolis (1981) and "The Five Doctors" (1983) featured a clip from The Dalek Invasion of Earth (1964) before the title sequence. Remembrance's cold open features a shot of the Earth with audio clips from 1963, including John F. Kennedy's American University speech and Martin Luther King Jr.'s "I Have a Dream" speech. Other clips from the early 60s were planned but did not make the final cut. Many songs from the time period can be heard in the background during several scenes in the serial.

== Themes and analysis ==
James Chapman, in his book Inside the TARDIS (2006), reported that the plot to revisit the Doctor's past and origins has been compared to a comic book trend in the 1980s to reinterpret the origin stories of comic-book characters. He also noted that the many continuity references in the story displayed a knowledge of the series' history, but that Remembrance of the Daleks was "neither a celebration of the Doctor Who legacy" like "The Five Doctors" (1983), "nor an exercise in fan-obsessive continuity" as was displayed in Attack of the Cybermen (1985).

The battle between Dalek factions has been likened to racism, which is apparent in the 1960s setting as Ace sees a sign that says "No Coloureds". The subtext was intentional, as Aaronovitch drew on the Daleks' Nazi theme and applied it to the setting. Cartmel was particularly proud of the scene and, when it was screened to BBC Head of Drama Mark Shivas, rewound the tape because Shivas had missed the sequence due to a phone call. Shivas felt that Ace should have torn the sign up, and Cartmel agreed it was a missed opportunity.

== Broadcast and reception ==
Episode	Title	Run time	Original release date	UK viewers (millions)
1	"Part One"	24:33	5 October 1988	5.5
2	"Part Two"	24:31	12 October 1988	5.8
3	"Part Three"	24:30	19 October 1988	5.1
4	"Part Four"	24:36	26 October 1988	5.0

This was the first time the programme was transmitted – albeit only in the London region – with NICAM stereo sound.

Reviews were mostly positive. Paul Cornell, Martin Day, and Keith Topping wrote in The Discontinuity Guide, "The best Doctor Who story in some considerable time, Remembrance of the Daleks reintroduced mystery and magic into the series with much intelligence and revisionist continuity". The A.V. Club reviewer Christopher Bahn, despite noting that the production had not aged well visually, called Remembrance of the Daleks "the Seventh Doctor era at its best". He was positive towards how going back to An Unearthly Child allowed Aaronovitch and Cartmel to "showcase their new, more devious master-planner version of the Doctor", as well as the action and the character moments for Ace. DVD Talk's J. Doyle Wallis, reviewing the original DVD release, gave the story three and a half out of five stars, calling it "a good ... adventure" and noting the shift in the Doctor's personality. Alasdair Wilkins of io9 called Remembrance "by a pretty wide margin the best anniversary special the show has ever done", praising the return to the 1960s and the various continuity references.

Patrick Mulkern of Radio Times praised the serial for "attempting to honour the programme's roots, even if, sadly, the effect is more of the present clomping all over the past", and questioned how the Doctor could have known about the Daleks in 1963 if he did not meet them until he left. He was also critical of the supporting characters and McCoy and Ace; he felt McCoy "struggles to convey gravitas" in the changes that had been made to his character, and while Aldred brought "gusto", Ace was "a peculiarly safe, middle-class rendering of a streetwise kid". Mulkern wrote that the action scenes were handled well, but some of the Daleks looked "fragile" and destroying Skaro was double genocide. John Sinnot, reviewing the second DVD release on DVD Talk, gave the serial three and a half out of five stars. He praised the action, references, and the Doctor's active involvement in the plot, but criticised the music and also questioned how the Doctor would have been able to plant the Hand of Omega for the Daleks. Sinnot also felt the Daleks acted "stupid" in some scenes, and wrote that the relationship between Ace and Mike was "clumsy and awkward". In 2010, Charlie Jane Anders of io9 listed the cliffhanger to the first episode – in which the Dalek levitates up the stairs – as one of the greatest cliffhangers in the history of Doctor Who. However, Anders felt that the execution was "pants, with Sylvester McCoy pulling some dreadful faces". In 2013, Den of Geek's Andrew Blair selected Remembrance of the Daleks as one of the ten Doctor Who stories that would make great musicals.

In the Doctor Who Magazine 1988 season poll, Remembrance of the Daleks was voted as the best story of season twenty-five with 64% of the vote, 46% ahead of The Greatest Show in the Galaxy. Ten years later, the magazine conducted a poll of readers to find the most popular Doctor Who stories of all time for the programme's 35th anniversary; Remembrance of the Daleks was voted 6th. In 2003, the magazine conducted a poll for the programme's 40th anniversary – this time, Remembrance of the Daleks finished 7th. Remembrance of the Daleks placed 14th in the magazine's 2009 "Mighty 200" reader survey, which ranked the 200 Doctor Who stories made up to that point. In the magazine's 50th anniversary poll, released in 2014, it placed 10th. In 2023, the story finished in 9th position in the magazine's 60th anniversary poll.

The 2021 Channel 4 drama It's a Sin contains a mocked-up scene of a fictional Doctor Who serial involving a Dalek attack in tribute to the actor Dursley McLinden, who appeared in Remembrance of the Daleks and whose life and early death from AIDS partially inspired the drama's main character played by Olly Alexander.

== Commercial releases ==
=== In print ===
Remembrance of the Daleks
- Author: Ben Aaronovitch
- Cover artist: Alister Pearson
- Series: Doctor Who book: Target novelisations
- Release number: 148
- Publisher: Target Books
- Publication date: 21 June 1990
- ISBN: 0-426-20337-2

Ben Aaronovitch's novelisation was published by Target Books in June 1990. Its use of a "darker Doctor and more modern approach" influenced the Virgin New Adventures, a series of more adult original novels that continued the Doctor Who story after the series was cancelled. The ancient Gallifreyan figure known as "The Other" first appears here, who had been instrumental to the Cartmel Masterplan, and whose storyline continued into the New Adventures. The novelisation also references Kadiatu Lethbridge-Stewart, who became a recurring character in the New Adventures. Certain phrases are also translated into the Daleks' language which refer to the Doctor as the "Ka Faraq Gatri" and is variously translated as "Bringer of Darkness" or "Destroyer of Worlds". The phrase is used throughout the Virgin New Adventures series to refer to the increasingly dark actions of the Seventh Doctor and is referred to again in "Journey's End" where Davros condemns the Tenth Doctor as the "Destroyer of Worlds".

The novelisation was rereleased in 2013 as part of a 50th anniversary collection of novels reprinted for each Doctor. Remembrance of the Daleks was the only novelisation in the range.

=== Home media ===
Remembrance of the Daleks was released on VHS with The Chase in September 1993 as a special Dalek tin set titled The Daleks: Limited Edition Boxed Set. It was re-released in 2001 as part of The Davros Collection, which was a limited-edition box set, exclusive to UK retailer WH Smith.

The serial was released on DVD in the United Kingdom on 26 February 2001, remastered by the Doctor Who Restoration Team. The original Region 2 DVD release has some video effects missing from episode 1 and the start of episode 2. This was an unforeseen consequence of the Restoration Team using earlier edits of these episodes to minimise generational quality loss, made before certain effects were added. The problem was corrected with subsequent DVD releases, including Region 1. This DVD also was not able to include two songs by The Beatles, "Do You Want to Know a Secret" and "A Taste of Honey", due to copyright; the former was replaced by the Billy J. Kramer and the Dakotas' version, while the latter was replaced with "generic production music".

The story was included as part of a limited run box set in 2003 with The Dalek Invasion of Earth and Resurrection of the Daleks. A remastered version of this story was released on Region 2 in November 2007, as part of The Complete Davros Collection and as a two-disc standalone release (including the 'Davros Connections' documentary from the boxset) on 20 July 2009. It includes the effects that were mistakenly left out and songs by The Beatles that weren't clearable for the original release but subsequently fell under a blanket music licensing agreement for the UK. There is also a newly remastered stereo and 5.1 surround sound mix. In the original Davros Boxset release version, there were two total mutes of the 5.1 soundtrack during episode one. 2entertain fixed the master within a few days of release and faulty copies could be exchanged for fixed ones via mail-in. The standalone version of the release uses the fixed version. The two-disc Special Edition was delayed due to clearance issues and was held off until it was released in the United States and Canada on 2 March 2010.

This serial was also released as part of the Doctor Who DVD Files in issue 29 on 10 February 2010, the first of the classic series to be released on the partwork. This marks the fourth different separate release of the serial on DVD.

In 2013, (in the USA and Australia) it was released on DVD for another time as part of the "Doctor Who: The Doctors Revisited 5–8" box set, alongside Earthshock, Vengeance on Varos, and the TV movie.

In 2017, a German-language audiobook version was released under the title Die Hand des Omega, read by Michael Schwarzmaier, the actor who dubbed the voice of the 7th doctor in the television series.
