= The Greatest Show in the Galaxy =

1988–89 Doctor Who serial

151 – The Greatest Show in the Galaxy
- Doctor Who serial
- 2012 DVD cover for The Greatest Show in the Galaxy

Cast
- Doctor: Sylvester McCoy – Seventh Doctor
- Companion: Sophie Aldred – Ace
- Others: T. P. McKenna – Captain Cook; Jessica Martin – Mags; Ricco Ross – Ringmaster; Ian Reddington – Chief Clown; Peggy Mount – Stallslady; Gian Sammarco – Whizz Kid; Daniel Peacock – Nord; Christopher Guard – Bellboy; Deborah Manship – Morgana; Chris Jury – Deadbeat; Dee Sadler – Flowerchild; Dean Hollingsworth – Bus Conductor; David Ashford – Dad; Janet Hargreaves – Mum; Kathryn Ludlow – Little Girl

Production
- Directed by: Alan Wareing
- Written by: Stephen Wyatt
- Script editor: Andrew Cartmel
- Produced by: John Nathan-Turner
- Executive producer: None
- Music by: Mark Ayres
- Production code: 7J
- Series: Season 25
- Running time: 4 episodes, 25 minutes each
- First broadcast: 14 December 1988
- Last broadcast: 4 January 1989

Chronology
← Preceded by Silver Nemesis	Followed by → Battlefield

The Greatest Show in the Galaxy is the fourth and final serial of the 25th season of the British science fiction television series Doctor Who, which was first broadcast in four weekly parts on BBC1 from 14 December 1988 to 4 January 1989. However, this story takes place chronologically before the previous serials, The Happiness Patrol and Silver Nemesis, but was broadcast after due to the BBC's broadcast of the 1988 Summer Olympics.

The serial is set on the planet Segonax. In the serial, visitors to the Psychic Circus are forced to put on acts for the amusement of their evil hosts.

== Plot ==
The Seventh Doctor and Ace are invited to the Psychic Circus on Segonax. Aside from others who have been invited, the Circus is surprisingly empty; a few entertainers and stagehands are present alongside the Ringmaster and Morgana, the ticket seller and fortune teller; the only audience is a stoic family of three: a father, mother, and daughter. The Doctor and Ace learn that they are expected to perform and those who fail to entertain the family are annihilated. Escape is nearly impossible, as the Chief Clown, aided by numerous kites used for surveillance, leads a group of mechanical clowns around the wastelands of Segonax to recapture escapees, such as Flower Child who is killed by a robot Bus Conductor.

The Doctor and Ace discover one of Flower Child's earrings and pins it to her jacket as a keepsake. (Note: The earring is visible on Ace's coat in The Happiness Patrol and Silver Nemesis, which clued the audience in to this serial happening before them.) The Chief Clown later notices this and demands to know where Ace got it; she flees into the circus, finding the robot-mechanic Bellboy hiding there. He recognises Flower Child's earring; although his memories were scrambled when he was captured, he tells Ace he remembers there being more people at the circus. Ace unties him and they hide in a circus caravan, where Ace is gifted with a robotic remote.

The Doctor, meanwhile, has joined with intergalactic explorer Captain Cook and Mags, who had also been invited to the circus. The Ringmaster tells them that they will be expected to entertain soon. Mags joins the Doctor as he explores the circus to try to learn what really is going on. They find a well, with a glowing energy source at the bottom, featuring an eye symbol similar to that on the Chief Clown's kites and Morgana's crystal ball. They are cornered by Cook along with several mechanical clowns, who tell the Doctor that he is on next. The Doctor escapes, encountering a worker named Deadbeat who has a medallion with the same eye symbol.

The Doctor enters the same caravan in which Ace and Bellboy are hiding. In the past, Deadbeat, then known as Kingpin and owner of the Psychic Circus, had come to Segonax in search of a great power; in finding it, the power drove him mad and the circus became enslaved to that power. The Chief Clown locates the three in the caravan, and Bellboy, feeling unable to move on after Flower Child's death, kills himself to let the Doctor and Ace escape.

The Doctor and Ace locate Deadbeat and take him to the well. The Doctor recognises Deadbeat's medallion is missing a piece; he believes it to be in the bus and offers to cover for Ace and Deadbeat to look for it by taking his role in the ring. Cook says that the Doctor, he, and Mags are up next. Cook asks for a beam of moonlight to aid in his performance, which reveals Mags to be a werewolf. However, instead of attacking the Doctor, she attacks and kills Cook. The family cheers, entertained by the violent display, and the Doctor and Mags escape. With no other entertainment, the family orders the Ringmaster and Morgana to perform, but they fail to entertain and are also killed.

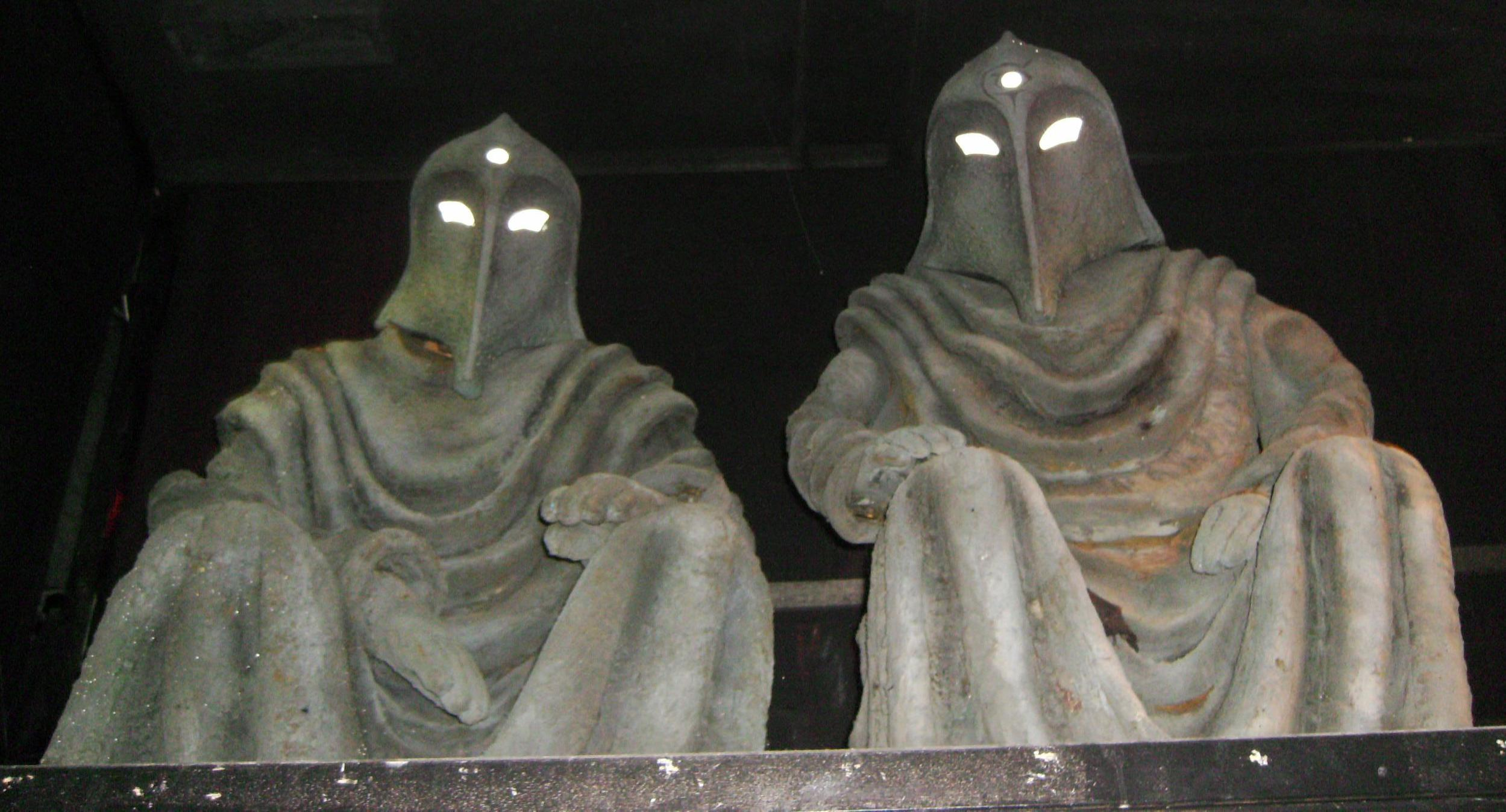
The Gods of Ragnarok, on display at a Doctor Who exhibition.

Ace and Dead Beat recover the medallion piece from the bus and, once attached, Deadbeat recovers his Kingpin personality. Kingpin helps defeat the Chief Clown and his robots before they return to the circus, only to find the Doctor has again been called to entertain the family. The Doctor has determined that the family are really Gods of Ragnarok, who feed on entertainment and kill those who do not satisfy them. The Doctor instructs Ace and Kingpin to retrieve Kingpin's medallion, which is linked to the dimensional portal that the Gods of Ragnarok use. The Gods of Ragnarok use the corpse of Captain Cook in an effort to stop them, but Ace kicks the corpse into the energy well. The Gods of Ragnarok are about to kill the Doctor but the well was a dimensional portal so the medallion falls into the ring. The Doctor uses the medallion to reflect the Gods of Ragnarok's blasts of power back onto them. As the temple collapses, the Doctor escapes via the main tent as it too is destroyed.

The Doctor regroups with Ace, Mags, and Kingpin. Kingpin and Mags decide to reclaim the circus and take it to a new planet to start it anew. The Doctor and Ace say their goodbyes.

== Production ==
The character of Whizz Kid was created as a parody of obsessive fans. Sylvester McCoy was coached in the magic tricks he performs in episode 4 by Geoffrey Durham, formerly known as the Great Soprendo.

Owing to the discovery of asbestos at the BBC, which led to the temporary closure of various television studios, this story nearly met the same fate as that of the uncompleted Shada - that of being cancelled after the location work had been completed. However, a tent was erected in the car park of BBC Elstree Centre, where the crew completed all sequences previously scheduled for the studio.

Model shots were originally created for this story to be used during Part 1 for when the Doctor's TARDIS is infiltrated by the advertising drone. They ended up not being used in the final programme but still exist in the BBC archive on their original 35mm elements. Thus they were included on the DVD release as a bonus feature.

=== Cast notes ===
Director Alan Wareing provides the voice for the third God of Ragnarok in Part Four. Dean Hollingsworth as the Bus Conductor is credited for Part Three, but does not appear. Hollingsworth had played an Android in Timelash (1985). Jessica Martin, who plays Mags in this episode, briefly returns in "Voyage of the Damned" (2007) voicing Queen Elizabeth II. Martin later reprised her role as Mags when she became a companion of the Seventh Doctor in Big Finish audio plays. Ian Reddington, the Chief Clown, reprised his role in the audio play The Psychic Circus and later played Nobody No-One in the audio play A Death in the Family. Harry Peacock, the brother of Daniel Peacock, who plays Nord the Vandal in this serial, later appeared in the 2008 episodes "Silence in the Library" and "Forest of the Dead" as Proper Dave.

== Broadcast and reception ==
Episode	Title	Run time	Original release date	UK viewers (millions)
1	"Part One"	24:23	14 December 1988	5.0
2	"Part Two"	24:20	21 December 1988	5.3
3	"Part Three"	24:30	28 December 1988	4.9
4	"Part Four"	24:24	4 January 1989	6.6

Part 4 received the highest viewing figure of Sylvester McCoy's time in Doctor Who - 6.6 million against Coronation Street.

Tat Wood described the serial as "a story with so much going right" and a sign of how he believed the show had improved since its mid-1980s period. Noting how difficult the story had been to film, he stated "it was worth it. This is everything Doctor Who should be." In The Discontinuity Guide, Paul Cornell, Martin Day and Keith Topping said: "The ideas in this, one of the most iconic stories, are very imaginative and the direction is psychedelic."

In his 2015 book Unofficial Doctor Who: The Big Book of Lists, author Cameron K. McEwan wrote: "While certainly not underappreciated by Sylvester McCoy fans (all twelve of them), those who are less impressed with the Seventh Doctor's run will find much to enjoy in this [...] the highlight is most definitely Ian Reddington's role as Chief Clown. A superb performance and, still to this day, one of Who's finest villains."

In the book The Doctors Are In, Graeme Burk wrote: "It's delightfully subversive and funny. Like all good satire, there is a variety of interpretations of what the target might be. But it's undergirded by some scary set pieces to make it tense, brilliant direction by Alan Wareing, some thoughtful moments and a stunning performance by Ian Reddington as the Chief Clown. McCoy, guided by Classic Who's last great director, turns in a lovely, nuanced performance." Co-author Robert Smith stated "this might be the ultimate McCoy story" which "showcases McCoy's quirky range".

In 2017, Entertainment Weekly chose the robot clowns from the story as among the "26 Scariest Pop-Culture Clowns" and described Ian Reddington's performance as "chilling".

== Commercial releases ==
=== In print ===
The Greatest Show in the Galaxy
- Author: Stephen Wyatt
- Cover artist: Alister Pearson
- Series: Doctor Who book: Target novelisations
- Release number: 144
- Publisher: Target Books
- Publication date: 21 December 1989
- ISBN: 0-426-20341-0

Stephen Wyatt's novelisation was published by Target Books in December 1989. An unabridged reading by Sophie Aldred was released on 1 August 2013 by BBC Audiobooks.

=== Home media ===
The Greatest Show in the Galaxy was released on VHS in January 2000. The Region 2 DVD release was on 30 July 2012, completing the DVD releases of Seventh Doctor stories. This serial was also released as part of the Doctor Who DVD Files in Issue 113 on 1 May 2013. The story was also released as part of the Doctor Who Collection set Season 25 on Blu-ray in October 2024 in the U.K.

=== Soundtrack release ===
Doctor Who: The Greatest Show in the Galaxy

Soundtrack album by Mark Ayres
- Released: 1992
- Genre: Soundtrack
- Length: 76:21
- Label: Silva Screen

Mark Ayres chronology
Doctor Who: The Curse of Fenric (1991)	Doctor Who: The Greatest Show in the Galaxy (1992)	Doctor Who: Ghost Light (1993)

Doctor Who soundtrack chronology
The Curse of Fenric (1991)	The Greatest Show in the Galaxy (1992)	Ghost Light (1993)

Music by Mark Ayres was released on CD in 1992 by Silva Screen Records.

==== Track listing ====
All tracks are written by Mark Ayres, except where noted.

No.	Title	Length
1.	"Introduction: 'Doctor Who'" (Ron Grainer arr. Keff McCulloch)
2.	"The Psychic Rap"
3.	"Invitation to Segonax"
4.	"Bellboy and Flowerchild"
5.	"A Warning"
6.	"Fellow Explorers"
7.	"The Robot Attacks"
8.	"Something Sinister"
9.	"'Welcome, One and All!'"
10.	"The Circus Ring"
11.	"Deadbeat"
12.	"Eavesdropping"
13.	"'Let Me Entertain You'/Stone Archway"
14.	"The Well"
15.	"Powers on the Move"
16.	"Sifting Dreams"
17.	"Survival of the Fittest"
18.	"Bellboy's Sacrifice"
19.	"Plans"
20.	"The Werewolf/'Request Stop'"
21.	"The Gods of Ragnarok"
22.	"Playing for Time"
23.	"Entry of the Psychic Clowns"
24.	"Liberty Who"
25.	"Psychic Carnvial"
26.	"Coda: Kingpin's New Circus"
27.	"Epilogue: 'Doctor Who'" (Ron Grainer arr. Keff McCulloch)

An edited suite of music from the story was also released on the series 50th Anniversary album from Silva Screen.
