= Metin Yenal =

German actor

- Born: Germany
- Occupation: Actor
- Notable work: Doctor Who (1988)

Metin Yenal is a German actor who played the character of Karl in the 1988 Doctor Who serial Silver Nemesis.

For a couple of years he was in a relationship with composer Peter Maxwell Davies before being dumped for a younger man.
