= Rassilon =

Fictional character in Doctor Who

- Doctor Who character
- Timothy Dalton as Rassilon in "The End of Time".
- First appearance: The Five Doctors (1983)
- Last appearance: "Hell Bent" (2015)
- Portrayed by: Richard Mathews (1983); Timothy Dalton (2009–10); Donald Sumpter (2015)
- Voiced by: Don Warrington (2002–04); Terrence Hardiman (2019); Richard Armitage (2021–)

In-universe information
- Species: Gallifreyan
- Affiliation: Time Lords
- Home: Gallifrey

Rassilon is a fictional character from the British science fiction television series Doctor Who. In the backstory of the programme, he was the founder of Time Lord society on the planet Gallifrey and its first leader. Rassilon was first mentioned in the 1976 serial The Deadly Assassin, where he was retconned into being a major establishing figure in Time Lord society, filling the role previously fulfilled by the character Omega. Despite his impact on Time Lord society, he was implied to be a cruel leader. He would later appear in the 1983 episode "The Five Doctors" in a physical appearance. In the show's revival, he appears as an antagonist in the 2009–2010 episodes "The End of Time" and the 2015 episode "Hell Bent". Rassilon has also appeared in a large amount of spin-off media associated with the show.

The role of Rassilon has been portrayed by several actors throughout the series, with Richard Mathews portraying him in "The Five Doctors", Timothy Dalton portraying him in "The End of Time", and Donald Sumpter portraying him in "Hell Bent". He also has been voiced by actors Don Warrington and Richard Armitage in Big Finish produced audio dramas. Rassilon has been analysed for his role as a leadership figure in the series, as well as in comparisons between the series and real-world religions.

== Character history ==
=== Television series ===
Doctor Who is a long-running British science-fiction television series that began in 1963. It stars its protagonist, The Doctor, an alien who travels through time and space in a ship known as the TARDIS, as well as their travelling companions. When the Doctor dies, they are able to undergo a process known as "regeneration", completely changing the Doctor's appearance and personality. Throughout their travels, the Doctor often comes into conflict with various alien species and antagonists.

Within the context of the series, Rassilon was a historic figure within the history of the Doctor's people, the Time Lords. Rassilon had fought in a war against a race known as the Great Vampires, constructed a defence system of living metal known as Validium, and created technology that could capture peoples from throughout time and space known as a Time Scoop. Rassilon worked with another Time Lord named Omega to create the first time travel spaceship, harnessing the power of a star undergoing a supernova to fuel the device. Though it succeeded, Omega disappeared during the incident. Rassilon harnessed the nucleus of the resulting black hole to provide the energy that powers time travel, resulting in much of Omega's praise being given to Rassilon, and Rassilon became a defining figure in Time Lord society. Rassilon took control of the Time Lords' home planet Gallifrey as its "Lord High President". Despite being seen in Time Lord society as a hero and benevolent ruler, the Doctor stated that rumors existed that Rassilon was secretly a dictator. Rassilon died long before the series' in-universe events began.

Though the character is first mentioned in the 1976 serial The Deadly Assassin, Rassilon first appears physically in "The Five Doctors" (1983), where the Lord President of Gallifrey, Borusa (Philip Latham), seeks immortality, which he believes can be granted via entering Rassilon's tomb. To accomplish this, Borusa uses the Time Scoop to transport various versions of the Doctor, their companions, and several of their enemies to the Death Zone, a location contains a tower holding Rassilon's tomb. Borusa uses them to find a way into the tower, at which point Borusa appears and seeks immortality from Rassilon. Rassilon (Richard Mathews) appears as a disembodied image, granting Borusa immortality by turning Borusa into a stone bust on Rassilon's tomb. Rassilon soon after dissipates, but returns the various displaced beings back to their home times.

Due to the effects of the Last Great Time War, a war waged across time and space by the Time Lords against the Daleks, Rassilon was revived into a physical form, becoming much crueler. Leading the Time Lords in the war, Rassilon learned that the Doctor planned to end the war by destroying both sides. Rassilon implanted the sound of a drumbeat in the head of antagonist the Master, and during the events of "The End of Time" (2009–2010), in which the Master (John Simm) turns every human on Earth into a copy of himself, the sound of the drumbeat is amplified, allowing Rassilon (Timothy Dalton) and the Time Lords to lock onto the signal it creates. Nearly escaping the Time War, the Tenth Doctor (David Tennant) destroys a device causing the drumbeat's amplification, causing the Time Lords and Rassilon to be returned to the War.

In "Hell Bent" (2015), set after the Doctor saves Gallifrey from being destroyed (as seen in the 2013 episode "The Day of the Doctor"), the Twelfth Doctor (Peter Capaldi) arrives on Gallifrey and learns that Rassilon (Donald Sumpter) was responsible for the Doctor's imprisonment and torture for four and a half billion years (as seen in the 2015 episode "Heaven Sent"), as well as being indirectly responsible for the death of the Twelfth Doctor's companion, Clara Oswald (Jenna Coleman). Rassilon briefly discusses matters with various Time Lords, including Ohila, a member of the Sisterhood of Karn, a Gallifreyan religious group. Upon arrival on Gallifrey, the Doctor leads a military revolt against Rassilon, deposes him, and sends him into exile.

=== Spin-off media ===
The Virgin New Adventures novel Cat's Cradle: Time's Crucible (1992) depicts the ancient history of Gallifrey, as well as Rassilon's role in its founding. The later novel Lungbarrow depicts a more tyrannical Rassilon, resulting in the mysterious "Other" fleeing from Rassilon. The 2014 novel Engines of War, set during the final days of the Time War, depicts some of Rassilon's actions during the War, including resurrecting Borusa to serve as an engine capable of predicting what moves Rassilon should take during the War. A comic strip, dubbed Supremacy of the Cybermen (2016), depicts Rassilon following the events of "Hell Bent", in which he encountered the Cybermen during his exile and allied with them to get revenge on the Doctor. The Cybermen eventually betray Rassilon, causing him and the Doctor to have to work together to stop them.

Rassilon appears in several audio dramas produced by Big Finish Productions. He appears in Zagreus (2003) where he, portrayed by Don Warrington, exists in the Matrix, a Time Lord information hub, and attempts to convert the Doctor into an assassin. Subsequent audio dramas depict Rassilon exiling the Doctor to another universe as punishment for not obeying him, and the Doctor's conflict with Rassilon. Rassilon further appears in the audio drama spin-off series Gallifrey, where he is shown revived from the dead, resulting in him becoming a dictator on Gallifrey. He comes into conflict with the Doctor's former companion Romana as a result. Rassilon also appears in several audio dramas in the Time War series, in which he is portrayed by actor Richard Armitage and depicts his role during the Time War.

== Conception and development ==
The seal of Rassilon. Named after Rassilon, the seal is often used as a way to visually identify Time Lords.

Rassilon was first introduced by name in the 1976 serial The Deadly Assassin, being created by writer Robert Holmes. Despite the character Omega previously having served as a mythical figure in Time Lord society, the serial introduces Rassilon and has him take over much of Omega's mythic role within the series. Though later spin-off media expanded on the relationship between the two, the change has been considered to be a retcon within the lore of the series. The character's later appearance in "The Five Doctors" was written by Terrance Dicks, who imitated Holmes's writing style and implied a dark, sinister past of Rassilon that expanded on what information was revealed about him in The Deadly Assassin. For the character's physical appearance, it was initially planned for Rassilon to be portrayed by actor Charles Grey, but this was changed to being played by Richard Mathews, a friend of the episode's director Peter Moffatt, who had a deep voice. Rassilon's depiction in this episode as a disembodied apparition left Rassilon's status following "The Five Doctors" unclear, with many involved with the show giving differing responses: some stated he was alive, others stated he was a projection or hologram, and others stated that Rassilon had died and was later revived. Dicks, who wrote the episode, wrote in Doctor Who Magazine that Rassilon has "gone to a higher plane where he's a benevolent being who can, if he feels it's a big enough crisis, intervene".

For the two-part episode "The End of Time", the unnamed Lord President in the original draft of the episode was decided to be depicted as Rassilon in its final draft. Actor Timothy Dalton portrayed the role of Rassilon. According to director Rachel Talalay, it was planned for Dalton to return to the role of Rassilon in "Hell Bent", but due to Dalton being unavailable, Donald Sumpter portrayed the part instead, with the change in actor being explained to be the result of regeneration. Sumpter was initially unaware of the role's importance within the show's mythos, and researched the part online and via watching Dalton's performance in "The End of Time".

== Analysis ==
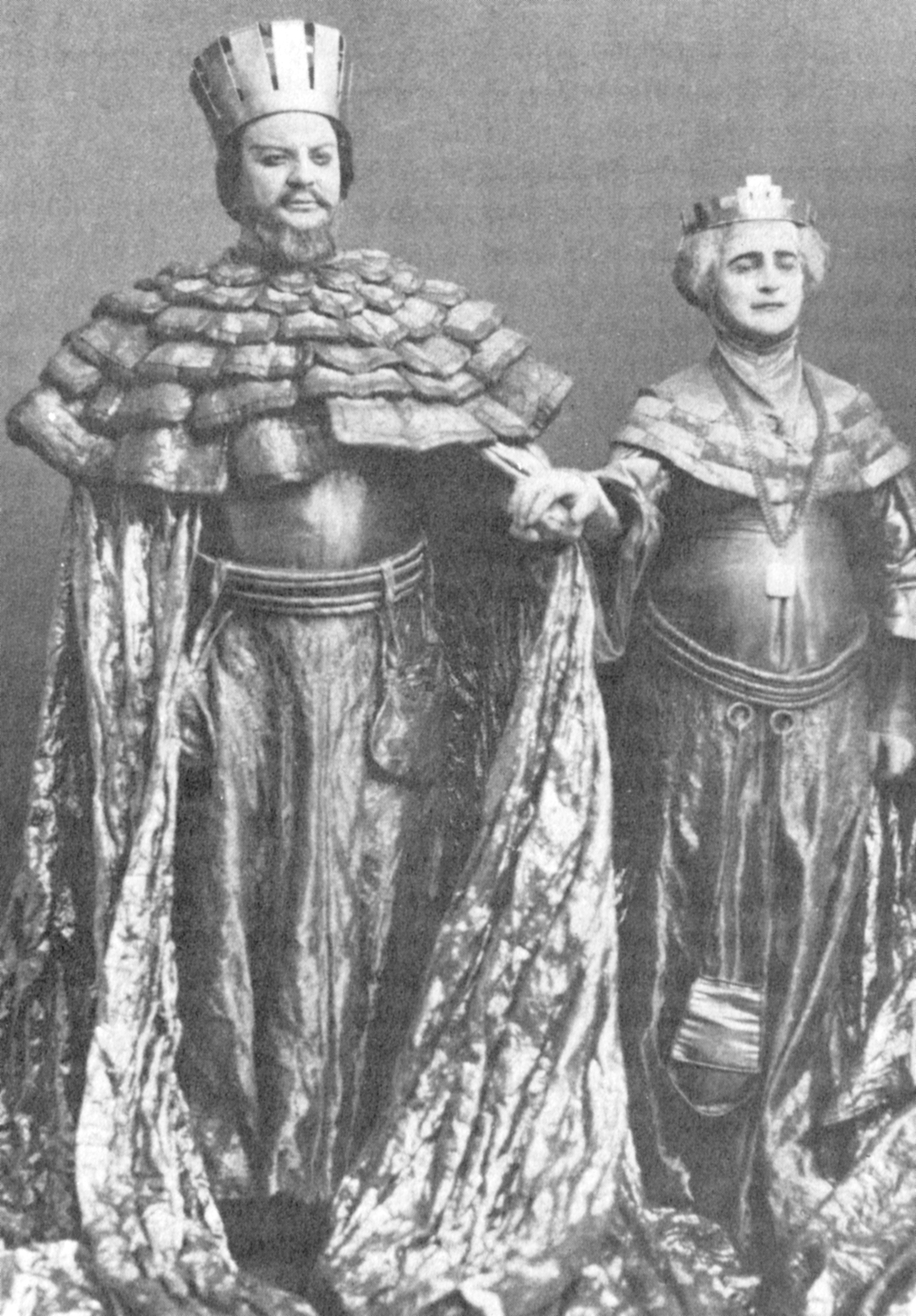
Rassilon was compared to King Claudius (pictured, left) by the book A Companion to Literature, Film, and Adaptation. Claudius is a major antagonist in the Shakespeare play Hamlet.

The book Women in Doctor Who: Damsels, Feminists and Monsters wrote that Rassilon embodied the idea of "supreme patriarchal power" in "Hell Bent", comparing his attempts at assuming authority to that of Ohila of the Sisterhood of Karn, who undermined his authority with cleverness. The book A Companion to Literature, Film, and Adaptation characterised Rassilon as being a corrupted fatherly figure in his role in the series, comparing him to the Hamlet character King Claudius. The book The Villain's Journey: Descent and Return in Science Fiction and Fantasy opined that Rassilon's role in "Hell Bent" served as an example of a tyrant, and that due to the Twelfth Doctor reminding the Time Lords that Rassilon only had power so long as they granted it to him, they could depose him.

Rassilon's role in "The Five Doctors" was stated by the paper Doctor Who and Immortality: Influence of Christian and Buddhist Ethics as being an example of showing that the pursuit of immortality in the real world was something considered "reprehensible". The paper compared Rassilon passing his judgement on Borusa as being similar to that of God, with Rassilon's actions symbolically stating that God had the final verdict in matters related to the length of a life. Similarly, his defeat in "The End of Time" were seen as being a result of karma catching up to Rassilon for his prior actions during the story, including the murder of a councilmember.

=== In popular culture ===
A long-running Doctor Who quiz group, The Quiz of Rassilon, is named after the character.
