= The Happiness Patrol =

149 – The Happiness Patrol
- Doctor Who serial

Cast
- Doctor: Sylvester McCoy – Seventh Doctor
- Companion: Sophie Aldred – Ace
- Others: Sheila Hancock – Helen A; Ronald Fraser – Joseph C; Georgina Hale – Daisy K; Harold Innocent – Gilbert M; Lesley Dunlop – Susan Q; Rachel Bell – Priscilla P; Jonathan Burn – Silas P; Tim Barker – Harold V; David John Pope – Kandyman; John Normington – Trevor Sigma; Richard D. Sharp – Earl Sigma; Tim Scott – Forum Doorman; Mary Healey – Killjoy; Steve Swinscoe, Mark Carroll – Snipers; Philip Neve – Wences; Ryan Freedman – Wulfric; Annie Hulley – Newscaster

Production
- Directed by: Chris Clough
- Written by: Graeme Curry
- Script editor: Andrew Cartmel
- Produced by: John Nathan-Turner
- Music by: Dominic Glynn
- Production code: 7L
- Series: Season 25
- Running time: 3 episodes, 25 minutes each
- First broadcast: 2 November 1988
- Last broadcast: 16 November 1988

Chronology
← Preceded by Remembrance of the Daleks	Followed by → Silver Nemesis

The Happiness Patrol is the second serial of the 25th season of the British science fiction television series Doctor Who, which was first broadcast in three weekly parts on BBC1 from 2 to 16 November 1988.

The serial is set on the Earth colony world Terra Alpha. In the serial, the alien time traveller the Seventh Doctor (Sylvester McCoy) starts a rebellion against the planet's ruler, Helen A (Sheila Hancock), a woman who seeks to eliminate all unhappiness on the planet.

== Plot ==
The Seventh Doctor and Ace visit a human colony on the planet Terra Alpha, to investigate its strangely joyful facade. There, they discover that a secret police force known as the Happiness Patrol are roaming the streets, hunting down and killing so-called 'Killjoys'. Their leader is Helen A, who governs the colony and is fanatically obsessed with eliminating unhappiness. Also in her employment is the Kandy Man, a grotesque, sweet-based robot created by Gilbert M, one of Helen A's senior advisers. After discovering the Patrol painting the TARDIS pink, much to Ace's disgust, she and the Doctor are arrested by Patrol member Daisy K. The Doctor is suspected of being a spy while Ace is taken to be recruited to join the Happiness Patrol.

After escaping the Waiting Zone, The Doctor and Ace meet an unhappy patrolwoman, Susan Q, and Earl Sigma, a wandering harmonica player. They become allies to the Doctor and Ace after they escape, along with the native inhabitants of Terra Alpha, the Pipe People. They work together to overthrow the tyranny of Helen A by supporting public protests of unhappiness, encouraging the people to revolt, and attempting to expose Helen A's population control programme to Trevor Sigma, an official galactic census taker.

The first to be disposed of is Helen A's pet Stigorax, Fifi, a rat-dog creature used to hunt down the Pipe People, as it is crushed in the pipes below the city when Earl causes an avalanche of crystallised sugar with his harmonica. Then they destroy the Kandyman in a flow of his own "fondant surprise" which had previously been used to execute the Killjoys. Realising that she cannot stop the revolution, Helen A attempts to escape the planet in a rocket, only to discover that the rocket has already been commandeered by Gilbert M and Joseph C, her husband. Angry at their betrayal, she tries to flee, but is stopped by the Doctor. He tries to teach her that happiness is not cosmetic, and it cannot exist without sadness. Helen A, refusing to listen to the man who helped topple her regime, sneers at him and says she'll find a place without tears. But when she discovers a dying Fifi lying on a bench, she rushes over to it and weeps bitterly.

As the TARDIS is being repainted its natural blue color, the Doctor and Ace bid farewell to Susan Q and Earl, who plan to repair the damage caused by Helen A by singing the blues. The Patrol finishes painting just as they leave. Before leaving Terra Alpha and the colony behind them, the Doctor says to a concerned Ace, "Happiness will prevail."

== Production ==
Working titles for this story included The Crooked Smile. McCoy recalled that the production team considered transmitting this story in black and white to fit with its intended film noir atmosphere, though this was only communicated to him after filming had concluded. A fan myth holds that the third episode was originally meant to be animated rather than filmed, but this was never the case. The entire serial was shot in studio in July and August 1988.

Helen A was intended to be a caricature of then British Prime Minister Margaret Thatcher, a figure who was deeply disliked by both cast and creatives; after Andrew Cartmel and Graeme Curry agreed that the serial should be an attack on Thatcher, the subtext was initially "back-pedalled slightly" but was then strengthened at the urging of Sheila Hancock who, hating Thatcher "with a deep and venomous passion", only accepted the part of Helen A on the condition that she could model her performance as closely on Thatcher as possible. The Doctor calling on the drones to down tools and revolt was intended as an allusion to the 1984–85 miners' strike and other industrial disputes in then-recent memory.

In the story, the Doctor sings "As Time Goes By", sung by Dooley Wilson in Casablanca. John Normington played Morgus in The Caves of Androzani, and later appeared in "Ghost Machine", an episode of Torchwood. Lesley Dunlop previously played Norna in 1984's Frontios and Harold Innocent would go on to appear in the 1993 radio serial The Paradise of Death.

== Broadcast and reception ==
Episode	Title	Run time	Original release date	UK viewers (millions)
1	"Part One"	24:51	2 November 1988	5.3
2	"Part Two"	24:48	9 November 1988	4.6
3	"Part Three"	24:25	16 November 1988	5.3

Bassett's complained over the similarity between the Kandy Man in this story and their trademark character. The BBC agreed not to use the Kandy Man again.

Radio Times reviewer Patrick Mulkern awarded The Happiness Patrol a full five stars and described it as a "clever and funny satire" and praised the acting and political commentary. DVD Talk's John Sinnott gave The Happiness Patrol five out of five stars, calling it a "minor masterpiece". He commended the irony, social commentary, and McCoy's acting. Authors Graeme Burk and Robert Smith included The Happiness Patrol in their 2013 book Who's 50: The 50 Doctor Who Stories to Watch Before You Die. For GamesRadar+ in 2015, Will Salmon included The Happiness Patrol among "The strangest Doctor Who stories", describing it as an "infamous Sylvester McCoy story" that "is actually rather good, but there's no denying its peculiarity [...] There's lots of interesting stuff going on beneath the surface of this story: anti-war speeches, Orwellian oppression and protests against Section 28. There's little doubt that, nearly 30 years later, it's still one of the most iconoclastic Doctor Who stories ever. And one of the oddest."

Despite the self-professed anti-Thatcherism of those involved with the story, Danny Nicol questioned whether this agenda was actually reflected in the story itself, stating in his book Doctor Who: A British Alien? that while "Helen A was played by Sheila Hancock in a way which served to remind the viewer of Margaret Thatcher [...] Helen A's policies — death squads, executions and the extensive state establishment of sugar factories — bear no relation to Thatcher's, making claims of a Thatcher metaphor less convincing." In The Discontinuity Guide, Paul Cornell, Martin Day and Keith Topping identify a gay subtext to the story: "there's entrapment over cottaging, the TARDIS is painted pink, and the victim of the fondant surprise is every inch the proud gay man, wearing, as he does, a pink triangle." The story ends with Helen A's husband abandoning her and leaving with another man.

Rowan Williams, Archbishop of Canterbury, made a brief reference to the story in his 2011 Easter sermon on the subject of happiness and joy. Marc Sidwell has described the story as an expression of national unease at rave culture.

== Commercial releases ==
=== In print ===
The Happiness Patrol
- Author: Graeme Curry
- Cover artist: Alister Pearson
- Series: Doctor Who book: Target novelisations
- Release number: 146
- Publisher: Target Books
- Publication date: 15 February 1990
- ISBN: 0-426-20339-9

A novelisation of this serial, written by scriptwriter Graeme Curry, was published by Target Books in February 1990. Adapting his scripts rather than the televised version, Curry's book includes scenes cut during editing and his original envisioning of the Kandy Man with a human appearance, albeit with powdery white skin and edible candy-cane glasses. An unabridged reading of the novelisation by Rula Lenska was released by BBC Audiobooks in July 2009.

=== Home media ===
The Happiness Patrol was released on VHS on 4 August 1997, by BBC Worldwide. It was then released on DVD on 7 May 2012 alongside Dragonfire as part of the "Ace Adventures" box set. This serial was also released as part of the Doctor Who DVD Files in Issue 119 on 24 July 2013.
