= Kevin Clarke (writer) =

English playwright and screenwriter

Kevin Clarke is an English playwright and screenwriter of film and television.

== Early life ==
Kevin Clarke spent his early childhood in care. He grew up in Birkenhead, Merseyside and left school at 16 to work as a guitarist. After busking in Paris he studied Drama at Bretton Hall, Leeds, and taught Drama in London for five years, writing in the evenings. He directed his first play The Jackpot at the Finborough Theatre; as a result he was invited to join the first BBC Television Writers training course and commissioned to write for the BBC TV series Casualty.

== Career ==
His subsequent theatre play Translantic written with Josh Goldstein ran for three months at the Dramatis Personae Theater in New York City, and his third, Charity's Child played the Riverside Studios. His original comedy screenplay, Albert and the Lion was produced by ITV. He has written more than 150 episodes of television drama, including scripts for Minder, Wish Me Luck, Ellington, Doctor Who (Silver Nemesis), Wycliffe, The Inspector Lynley Mysteries and The Last Detective. He was a principal writer on The Bill for five years where he created the cult character Roxanne, giving Paul O'Grady his television breakthrough.

Kevin later gained an Open University degree in History, then read postgraduate History at Oxford. He gained a subsequent MA in Renaissance Studies at Birkbeck, University of London.
