= Stephen Wyatt =

British stage, screen writer (b. 1948)

Stephen Wyatt, born 4 February 1948 in Beckenham, Kent (now Greater London), is a British writer for theatre, radio and television.

== Early life and education ==
Wyatt was raised in Ealing, West London. He was educated at Latymer Upper School and then Clare College, Cambridge. After a brief spell as lecturer in Drama at Glasgow University, he began his career as a freelance playwright in 1975 as writer/researcher with the Belgrade Theatre Coventry in Education team.

Full listings of his work can be found on his website.

== Theatre work ==
His subsequent young people's theatre work includes The Magic Cabbage (Unicorn Theatre, 1978), Monster (York Theatre Royal, 1979) and The Witch of Wapping (Half Moon, 1980).

In 1982 and 1983, he was Resident Writer with the Bubble Theatre for whom he wrote Glitterballs and The Rogue's Progress.

His other theatre work includes After Shave (Apollo Theatre, 1978), R.I.P Maria Callas (Edinburgh Festival Fringe / Hen and Chickens, 1992), A Working Woman - from Émile Zola’s L'Assommoir (West Yorkshire Playhouse, 1992), Pick Yourself Up (Queen's Theatre, Hornchurch, 2011), A Victorian Mikado (Krazy Kat Theatre, 2011), The Standard Bearer (Waterloo East Theatre, London / Stephanie Feury Studio Theatre, Los Angeles, 2014), The Devil in the Belfry - libretto after a scenario by Claude Debussy (Gottingen 2013), and Told Look Younger (Jermyn Street Theatre, London, 2015).

He also collaborated with Jeff Clarke on The Burglar's Opera for Opera della Luna (2004) "stolen from an idea by W. S. Gilbert with music nicked from Sir Arthur Sullivan" and with the Weaver Dance Company on The Loves of Mars and Venus and The Loves of Pygmalion.

His latest comedy, Two Cigarettes in the Dark (starring Penelope Keith and directed by Alan Strachan), opened at the Chichester Festival Theatre in February 2022.

== Television work ==
Wyatt's first work for television was Claws, filmed by the BBC in 1987, starring Simon Jones and Brenda Blethyn. He was then commissioned by Andrew Cartmel to write two scripts for the science-fiction series Doctor Who, which were Paradise Towers and The Greatest Show in the Galaxy, both starring Sylvester McCoy as the Seventh Doctor. His other television credits include scripts for The House of Eliott and Casualty.

In 2020 Big Finish brought out The Psychic Circus, Stephen's audio drama prequel to The Greatest Show in the Galaxy.

== Radio work ==
He has worked for BBC Radio since 1985 as both an adapter and an original playwright.

=== Radio adaptations ===
- Sketches by Boz (1998–1999)
- The Old Wives' Tale (2003)
- Gilbert without Sullivan (2003–2004)
- Vanity Fair (2004)
- Oblomov (2005)
- Tom Jones (2007)
- The Talented Mr Ripley (2009)
- Alice Through the Looking Glass (2012)
- The Divine Comedy (2014)

=== Original plays ===
- Fairest Isle (1995, Sony Award Winner)
- Gray's Elegy (2000)
- Party Animal (2003)
- Dr Brighton and Mr Harding (2006)
- Memorials to the Missing (2007)
- Gerontius (2011)
- Finlandia (2015)
- The Psychic Circus (Big Finish 2020)
- The Seven Ages of Woman (2021)
- Breaking the Rules: A House Called Insanity (2024)

== Publications ==
- Three plays by Pinero - Introduced by Stephen Wyatt (Methuen, 1985)
- Paradise Towers (Target Books, 1988)
- The Greatest Show in the Galaxy (Target Books, 1989)
- Memorials to the Missing (London, 2007)
- R.I.P, Maria Callas and other monologues for stage and radio (London, 2007)
- Gilbert without Sullivan (London, 2007)
- L'Assommoir (London, 2007)
- The Speculator (London, 2009)
- So You Want To Write Radio Drama? with Claire Grove (Nick Hern Books, 2013)
- The World and His Wife: A true story told by two unreliable narrators (Book Guild 2019)
- Hurst on Film with Caitlin Smith (Quartertoten 2021)
- 'The Secret Life of Caretaker Number 112 Stroke 9 Subsection 7' in Build High for Happiness (Obverse Books 2021)
- The Wallscrawler and Other Stories (Obverse Books 2022)

== Awards ==
His play Memorials to the Missing (2007) won the Tinniswood Award for best original radio script of 2007 and Silver in the Best Drama category of the 2008 Sony Radio Academy Awards.

His radio drama Gerontius (2010) won the 2011 Tinniswood Award for Best Radio Drama Script.
