= Cold Fusion (novel) =

1996 novel by Lance Parkin

- Author: Lance Parkin
- Series: Doctor Who book: Virgin Missing Adventures
- Release number: 29
- Subject: Featuring: Fifth Doctor; Seventh Doctor; Adric, Nyssa, Tegan; Chris, Roz
- Set in: Period between Castrovalva and Four to Doomsday
- Publisher: Virgin Books
- Publication date: December 1996
- ISBN: 0-426-20489-1
- Preceded by: The Plotters
- Followed by: Burning Heart

Cold Fusion is an original novel written by Lance Parkin and based on the long-running British science fiction television series Doctor Who. It features the Fifth Doctor, with Adric, Nyssa, and Tegan, immediately after Castrovalva. Also appearing is the Seventh Doctor, with Chris and Roz, from between the Virgin New Adventures novels Return of the Living Dad and The Death of Art. It was the only one of the Virgin Doctor Who novels to feature more than one Doctor.

== Notes ==
The story deliberately contrasts the characterisation of the Fifth Doctor and of the Seventh Doctor in the Virgin New Adventures. In an interview for the BBC, in discussing Cold Fusion, Parkin described the character of Adric as "hopeless with Davison". Parkin has said he was writing a book about the Yugoslav Wars, that is a conflict "where horrible things are happening, and clearly there's a case for international intervention, but … well, there's no clear good guys and bad guys. And that was the idea of the book: two Doctors show up and they look at a situation like Yugoslavia/Syria and they, completely independently, perfectly sensibly, pick a side to support. And they pick different sides, so spend the book fighting each other." He also said he "was never happy with Cold Fusion. It was the second novel I wrote, and I always had the sense it had got away from me, but I'd never been able to explain why. My first, Just War, was very taut, serious, fine-tuned. Cold Fusion was always a lot more ramshackle."

Cold Fusion includes many references to the Cartmel Masterplan which would be more fully explored in Lungbarrow. More is learned about the character of Patience in the BBC Past Doctor Adventures novel The Infinity Doctors, also by Lance Parkin. It is suggested that she is the Doctor's (or possibly The Other's) wife, but how she fits into normal continuity is deliberately not revealed.

Notably, this novel features a sequence in which the Doctor recalls his life on Gallifrey and in which this earlier Doctor has recently regenerated in a form heavily inferred to be one of the "Morbius Doctors" seen in the mind bending sequence of the serial The Brain of Morbius, specifically the incarnation which was represented by an image of Douglas Camfield. While it is inferred in this book to be an incarnation of the Doctor, the novel Lungbarrow suggests it may in fact be an incarnation of the Other.

Names in the book are very similar to those of the main characters (and the actors) in the BBC comedy Terry and June, so the book includes a Medford, a Whitfield, a Scott, and a Terry and June.

== Reception ==
Readers of Doctor Who Magazine gave the novel a rating of 76.69% (from 845 votes).

Empire magazine recommended the book if someone were to only read one Missing Adventure, describing it as "mind-bending sci-fi with the Fifth Doctor (and a cameo for the Seventh) and an inside-out TARDIS."

== Audio adaptation ==
Big Finish Productions released an audio drama adaptation of the novel in December 2016. The release was announced in July 2016. It starred Peter Davison, Sylvester McCoy, Janet Fielding, Sarah Sutton and Matthew Waterhouse reprising their television roles as the Fifth and Seventh Doctors, Tegan Jovanka, Nyssa and Adric respectively. In addition, Yasmin Bannerman and Travis Oliver reprised their roles as the Seventh Doctor's companions Roz Forrester and Chris Cwej from Big Finish's adaptations of the New Adventures novels Damaged Goods and Original Sin. Christine Kavanagh plays the role of Patience.

Starburst gave the audio a mixed review, describing it as "an odd fish".
