= Shakedown: Return of the Sontarans =

- VHS Release cover

Production
- Directed by: Kevin Davies
- Written by: Terrance Dicks
- Produced by: Mark Ayres; Kevin Davies
- Executive producer: Gary Leigh
- Music by: Mark Ayres
- Running time: 1 episode, 55 mins.
- First broadcast: 1 December 1994 (release date)

Shakedown: Return of the Sontarans is a film spin-off of the long-running British science fiction television series Doctor Who. It was released direct-to-video in 1995 and was produced by the independent production company Dreamwatch Media, a division of Dreamwatch magazine. Initially available only through mail order and speciality shops, it was subsequently released to retail by Reeltime Pictures in 1997. It features two races of aliens, the Sontarans (first introduced in the Third Doctor serial The Time Warrior, and appearing in several subsequent stories) and the Rutans (who were first mentioned in The Time Warrior, and appeared in the Fourth Doctor serial Horror of Fang Rock). The Sontarans and Rutans were licensed from the estate of their creator Robert Holmes, although the appearance of the Sontarans had to be modified to avoid legal complications with the BBC, which owned the design of the creatures.

Due to licensing restrictions, the character of the Doctor does not actually appear, nor do any other characters from the series. However several actors from the Doctor Who series do appear in different roles, including Carole Ann Ford, Sophie Aldred and Michael Wisher, alongside Blake's 7 actors Jan Chappell and Brian Croucher.

== Plot ==
Tiger Moth, a space cruiser recently converted to a solar yacht, is on its way to space station Beta for its first race. The yacht is owned and crewed by a syndicate of four business people – Kurt, who is rumoured to have a shady criminal background; Nikos, the son of Earth colony planet Valeria's leading industrialist; Mari, the daughter of Valeria's president and Nikos's fiancée; and Zorelle, an attention-seeking fashion mogul. Engineer Robar informs captain Lisa Deranne, an experienced solar yacht racer hired by the syndicate, of irregular fluctuations in the ship's power system. Lisa uses this as an excuse to put her amateur crew through their first solar sail drill, whilst Robar shuts down the power drive to investigate the fault.

The crew assembles on the sail deck, where they don virtual reality gloves and glasses to operate the solar sails in the same context as a traditional sea-going yacht. After the drill is successfully carried out, Tiger Moth is attacked by a huge War Wheel mothership, which dispatches a boarding party of Sontaran troopers led by Commander Steg. Lisa and her crewmates are stunned by the Sontarans as they enter the solar yacht, and once the group recover in their crew quarters, Steg explains that he is on a mission to find a shape-shifting Rutan spy. The Sontarans tracked the Rutan to space station Alpha, Tiger Moth's last port of call, so they are now searching every vessel that left there recently. Although Steg claims that he will leave the humans in peace, Kurt warns Lisa that the ruthless Sontarans will destroy the Tiger Moth.

Robar, unaware of the Sontarans on board the Tiger Moth, has been working on the ship's power units to resolve the fluctuations. He discovers the cause to be the energy-dependent Rutan spy, who kills Robar and adopts his human form. It then kills a Sontaran trooper sent to find Robar, and attempts to escape in the Sontarans' assault craft, but Lieutenant Vorn discovers the disguised Rutan and fires at it, injuring the Rutan and forcing it to retreat. Vorn reports this to Steg, who orders a thorough search of the power room, where the Sontarans find the dead trooper and Robar's partially dissected body. Steg shows this to Lisa, encouraging her to help him destroy the Rutan, and she agrees if Steg leaves her crew and ship unharmed. Steg promises to do so, but he secretly intends to destroy the Tiger Moth as per his duty.

When Lisa briefs the rest of the crew on the situation, Kurt is still suspicious, so Zorelle – fearing that Kurt's resistance could endanger her own life – tells Steg about Lisa and Kurt plotting to kill him. Steg gives his blaster to Kurt and tests him to use it. Kurt suspects a trick and does not fire, but Nikos takes the blaster and tries – only to learn that the blaster was not primed, and Steg kills him. Mari goes berserk and has to be sedated, leaving just Lisa, Kurt and Zorelle to help the Sontarans hunt the Rutan. After they leave Mari in the crew quarters, the Rutan kills her, and inhabits her body to kill Zorelle too when she returns. Lisa and Kurt kill Vorn and the remaining troopers, then confront Steg at the airlock. Kurt is wounded by Steg, but Lisa guns down the commander, who salutes her as a worthy enemy. The Rutan arrives in Zorelle's ghostly form, and vows to leave Lisa and Kurt unharmed, before entering the assault ship to escape with the secrets it learned. Steg warns Lisa of a bomb he planted in the airlock tunnel to destroy the Tiger Moth. Lisa places the bomb in the assault ship, and Steg helps her escape from the closing airlock before he dies. Lisa and Kurt watch on the scanners as the assault ship departs and explodes.

Lisa tends to Kurt's injuries, thinking that this disastrous shakedown cruise will be the end of her solar racing career. However, Kurt reveals that, as the sole surviving syndicate member, he inherits the others' shares in the Tiger Moth's finances, so he can afford the repairs and hire a professional crew. With Lisa and Kurt now racing partners and in a relationship together, the captain contacts station Beta to start preparations in time for the upcoming race.

== Cast ==
- Jan Chappell as Tiger Moth Captain Lisa Deranne. The heroine of the story, Lisa is hired by a group of wealthy individuals to help them pilot the solar vessel and win competitive races. Whilst she has an antagonistic relationship with most of the group, she later forms a close bond with Kurt and, along with him, is one of only two survivors at the end. Jan Chappell had previously played Cally in Blake's 7 alongside Kurt actor Brian Croucher. The role of Lisa Deranne was originally offered to Elisabeth Sladen, but she declined citing family commitments.
- Brian Croucher as Kurt. A mysterious self-made industrialist, Kurt recognizes the Sontarans based on information he has obtained from an individual implied to be The Doctor. Along with Captain Lisa Deranne, he survives at the end of the story and becomes the sole owner of the Tiger Moth. Brian Croucher had played Travis 2 in Blake's 7 alongside co-star Jan Chappell.
- Carole Ann Ford as Zorelle, a vain and wealthy fashion designer (although it is suggested by Mari that it is actually her sister that is the brains of the company) who also drinks too much; she is killed by the Rutan shapeshifter which later assumes her form at the conclusion of the story. Ford was best known as playing Susan Foreman, the granddaughter of the Doctor in the original series.
- Sophie Aldred as Mari, the fiancée of Nikos; the spoilt and pampered daughter of a planetary president, she is stunned by the Sontarans and later killed by the Rutan when it invades her quarters- the Rutan form of Mari then kills Zorelle. Aldred had previously played Ace, companion to the Seventh Doctor in Doctor Who. Keith Barnfather suggested to Aldred that she take on the role of Lisa Deranne after Elisabeth Sladen dropped out, but she wanted to play a more feminine character instead after three years of playing Ace in Doctor Who.
- Rory O'Donnell as Nikos, Mari's fiancé and the son of a wealthy industrialist. In love with Mari, he is first stunned by the Sontarans and later killed by them when he attempts to overpower them with their stun ray. The Rutan later takes on his form before killing Mari. Shakedown was O'Donnell's first acting job, he later appeared in the fan production Auton 3 before becoming a casting director.
- Michael Wisher as Robar, the ship's engineer. Robar is the first to be killed by the Rutan whilst in the engine room. Wisher had appeared in a few Doctor Who stories in the classic series, but was best known in fandom for being the first actor to play Davros, the creator of the Daleks. Wisher also had appeared in a number of fan-made productions in the 1980s and 1990s, including Wartime and The Airzone Solution. Shakedown would be Wisher's last work as an actor as he died the following year. Terrance Dicks was reportedly not happy with Wisher's decision to play Robar with an American accent. The role of Robar was originally mooted for Brian Miller, the husband of Elisabeth Sladen, although her withdrawal from the project meant he did not eventually get involved.
- Toby Aspin as Commander Steg, the leader of the Sontaran force chasing the Rutan. Although initially antagonistic to Lisa Deranne and her crew, he sacrifices himself to destroy the Rutan and save the ship at the story's conclusion. Aspin would later appear as another Sontaran in "Mindgame".
- Tom Finnis as Lieutenant Vorn, Steg's second-in-command. Slightly dimwitted, he is killed by the Rutan. Finnis would later appear in the fan production The Few Doctors, which Kevin Davies also directed.

== Production ==
The film was shot almost entirely on location aboard the Second World War-era Royal Navy light cruiser HMS Belfast, permanently moored at Symon's Wharf on the River Thames since 1971. Some scenes were also shot at Pinewood Studios. Filming aboard the vessel was frequently plagued with sound problems which caused the film crew to rapidly fall behind schedule. The unlicensed nature of the Dreamwatch production meant that they could not even refer to the character of the Doctor by name, hence Kurt's remembrance of a man who "Called himself the Physician, or the Dentist, or something..." Although the longstanding war between the Sontarans and the Rutan Host was frequently mentioned in Doctor Who, this video marks the only occasion in which the two opposing species appear on screen together. The initial idea for Shakedown came from producers Kevin Davies and Mark Ayres. Director of Photography David Hicks. They would produce, on behalf of Dreamwatch Media, a low-budget film for direct-to-video sale featuring some alien monsters from the BBCtv series Doctor Who and a cast drawn from Who and its stablemate Blake's 7.

== Soundtrack ==
Shakedown: Return of the Sontarans - Original Soundtrack Recording

Soundtrack album by Mark Ayres
- Released: January 1996
- Genre: Soundtrack
- Length: 44:12
- Label: Silva Screen

Mark Ayres chronology
The Innocent Sleep (1995)	Shakedown: Return of the Sontarans - Original Soundtrack Recording (1996)	Doctor Who: The Daleks in Colour (2024)

Mark Ayres's music was released on Silva Screen Records in January 1996.

=== Track listing ===
All tracks are written by Mark Ayres.

No.	Title	Length
1.	"Shakedown: Main Title"	2:05
2.	"The War Wheel"	0:55
3.	"Working Dress"	0:48
4.	"Sail Drill (Virtual Rigging)"	2:22
5.	"The Storming of the "Tiger Moth""	4:41
6.	"A Bit of This, A Bit of That"	3:58
7.	"Engine Room"	2:18
8.	"Return of the Sontarans"	5:30
9.	"Survival at all Costs"	1:02
10.	"Robar Remembered"	1:46
11.	"A Glorious Death"	2:27
12.	"Monster Hunt"	1:23
13.	"Worthy Enemies"	5:19
14.	"Epilogue and End Title"	3:32
15.	"Theme from Shakedown"	5:53

== Reception ==
Craig Hinton in Doctor Who Magazine heavily praised the performances of the cast, in particular Sophie Aldred's performance, although he was critical of the character of Lieutenant Vorn.

Modern reception to the story has also been positive, with Digital Spy calling it, "a commendably ambitious and handsomely-mounted sci-fi tale", while Dylan Rees in his book Downtime - The Lost Years of Doctor Who, stated that it was, "simple, fun, and frightening in equal measure, and best captures the spirit of the show from which it took its inspiration".

== Novelisation ==
Shakedown
- Author: Terrance Dicks
- Cover artist: Peter Elson
- Series: Doctor Who book: Virgin New Adventures
- Release number: 45
- Subject: Featuring: Seventh Doctor; Benny, Chris, Roz
- Publisher: Virgin Books
- Publication date: December 1995
- ISBN: 0-426-20459-X
- Preceded by: The Also People
- Followed by: Just War

In December 1995 a novelisation of this film, written by Terrance Dicks, was published by Virgin Publishing as part of their New Adventures line; the title was shortened to Shakedown. It expands greatly on the original story and features many differences in plot, most notably the inclusion of the Seventh Doctor and his companions since, unlike Reeltime, Virgin had the rights to use the character. However, rather than drastically altering the events of the video, Dicks novelised the Doctor-less events of the script in the middle section of the book, with the new plot of the novel taking place around it. It also forms a sequel to the Virgin Missing Adventures novel Lords of the Storm by David A. McIntee.

This was the final Doctor Who-related novelisation by the prolific Terrance Dicks, who had been writing the books since 1973, until the BBC-published novelisation of The Sarah Jane Adventures story "Invasion of the Bane" was published over a decade later in late 2007. Dicks has, however, continued to produce various original Doctor Who novels not based on scripted material.

The book was re-printed in a new edition in March 2014.
