= Cat's cradle (disambiguation) =

Cat's cradle is a well-known series of string figures.

Cat's cradle may also refer to:

== Literature ==
- Cat's Cradle, a 1963 novel by Kurt Vonnegut
- Cat's Cradle (Golding novel), a 2011 novel in the Cat Royal series by Julia Golding
- A 1992 series of three novels based on the TV series Doctor Who:
  - Cat's Cradle: Time's Crucible, by Marc Platt
  - Cat's Cradle: Warhead, by Andrew Cartmel
  - Cat's Cradle: Witch Mark, by Andrew Hunt
- "Cat's Cradle", a stage play by Leslie Sands
- Cat's Cradle, a 1925 novel by Maurice Baring

== Film and television ==
- Cat's Cradle (film), a 1959 film by Stan Brakhage
- "Cat's Cradle" (The Penguins of Madagascar), an episode of The Penguins of Madagascar
- The Cat's Cradle, a 1965 television play by Hugo Charteris, starring Leo Genn

== Other uses ==
- A microphone shock mount strung in a "cat's cradle" arrangement
- Cat's Cradle (venue), a music venue in Carrboro, North Carolina
- The cat and cradle legend of St. Elizabeth's flood (1421) in Holland

== See also ==
- "Cat's in the Cradle", a song by Harry Chapin
- "Cats in the Cradle" (CSI), an episode of CSI
