= Andrew Cartmel =

British script editor and author (born 1958)

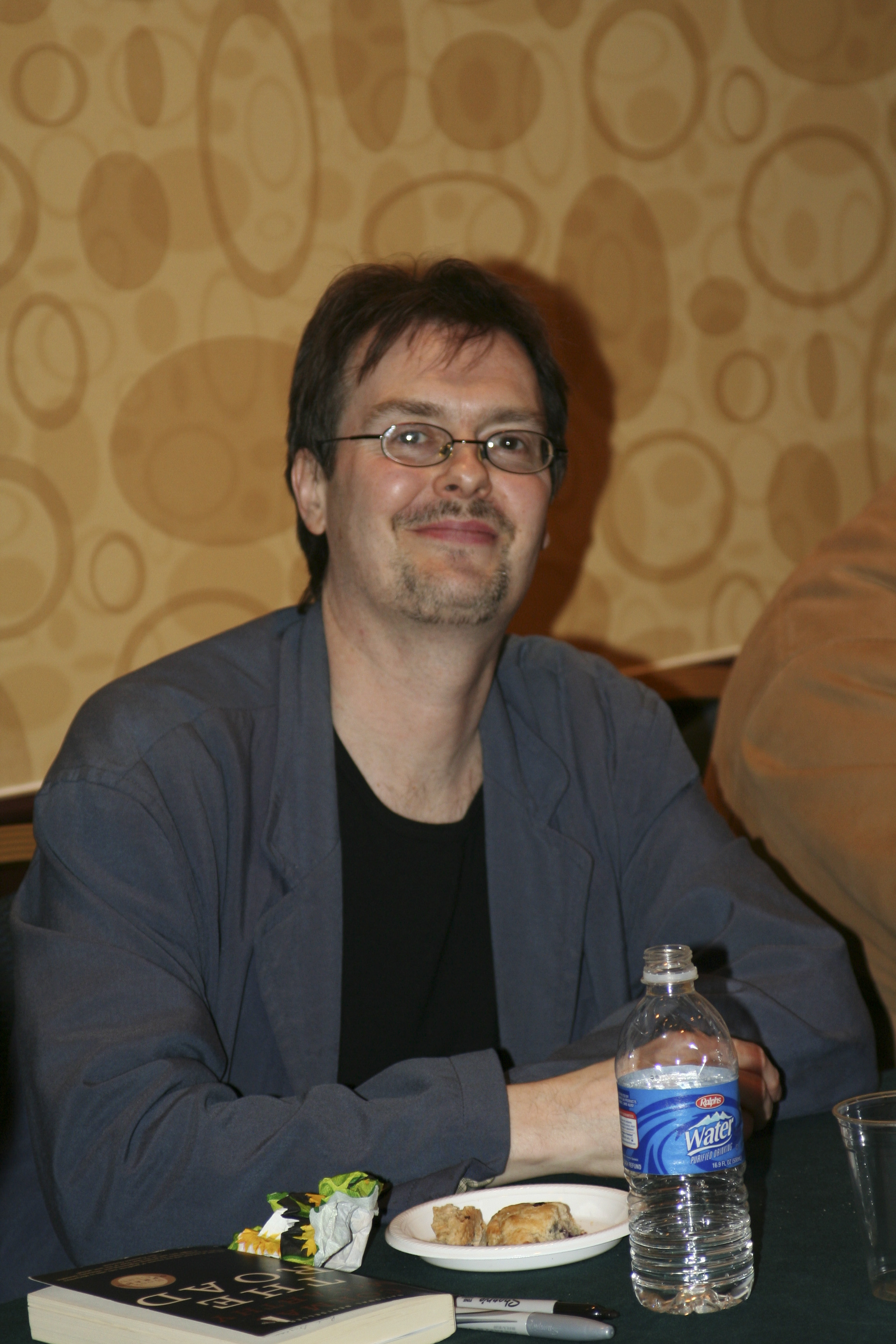
- Cartmel at a Doctor Who convention in 2008
- Born: Andrew J. Cartmel; 6 April 1958 (age 68) Woolwich, London, England
- Area: Writer

Andrew J. Cartmel (born 6 April 1958) is a British script editor, author and journalist. He was the script editor of Doctor Who during the Sylvester McCoy era of the show between 1987 and 1989. He has also worked as a script editor on other television series, as a magazine editor, as a comics writer, as a film studies lecturer, and as a novelist.

== Biography ==
Raised in Canada, Cartmel returned to England in order to complete his education. He took a post-graduate course in computer studies and worked on computer-aided design for Shape Data Ltd (now UGS Corp) in Cambridge, England during the mid-1980s. He then turned more to writing and managed to gain an agent on the strength of two unproduced scripts, also attending workshops run by the BBC Television Drama Script Unit.

In late 1986, when he was in his late twenties, Cartmel was hired as the script editor for the twenty-fourth season of the science-fiction programme Doctor Who, having been recommended to the producer John Nathan-Turner by the producer's agent, who had seen some unproduced scripts Cartmel had written. Cartmel worked on the programme for the next three years, overseeing the final three seasons of its original run on BBC One. He brought in several young, new writers and despite declining ratings, tried to take the series in a new creative direction.

The most significant legacy of this new direction might have been the so-called "Cartmel Masterplan", a backstory developed with other writers that restored some of the mystery of the Doctor's background and could have explained exactly who he was. Although hints were dropped in the two final series Cartmel edited, the proposed revelations never materialised on screen because the programme was taken off the air in 1989.

When production of Doctor Who was placed on indefinite hold, Cartmel became script editor on the BBC's popular medical drama series Casualty for one season. In the 1990s he wrote comic strips for Judge Dredd Megazine and Doctor Who Magazine and three Doctor Who novels for Virgin Books in their New Adventures series. This series had used elements of the "masterplan" as part of their overall story arc for the Doctor, particularly in the last Seventh Doctor novel Lungbarrow, written by Marc Platt.

In 1999 his first original novel, The Wise, was published in Virgin's short-lived series of new science-fiction novels, Virgin Worlds. That same year he became editor of the science-fiction magazine Starburst, although the appointment was a short one and he left the magazine in 2000.

Since then he has written several pieces of Doctor Who fiction: in 2000 Winter for the Adept, an audio drama for Big Finish Productions; in 2003 Foreign Devils, a novella for Telos Publishing; and in 2005 Atom Bomb Blues, a novel for BBC Books. He developed a script for the third series of Torchwood entitled 'The Jinx', but it was dropped when the show's format was reworked. In 2010 Cartmel worked as script editor for Big Finish Productions' The Lost Stories line, overseeing the adaptation of story ideas created for Doctor Who's unmade 27th series into audio dramas (released in 2011). In addition to script-editing the four "Season 27" stories, Cartmel wrote two scripts (Crime of the Century and Animal) and co-wrote a third, Earth Aid, with Ben Aaronovitch.

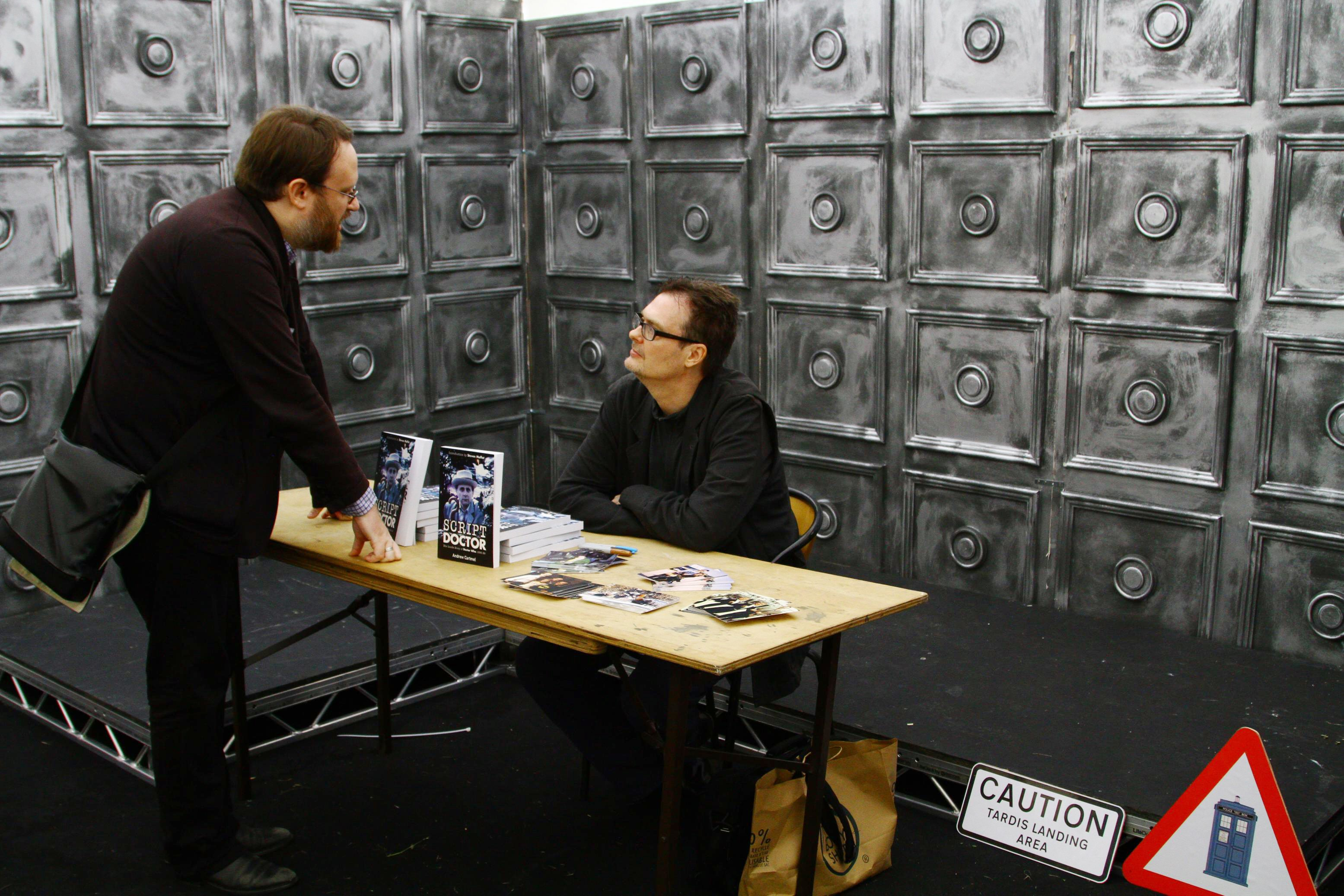
Cartmel at a convention in 2014, with his book, Script Doctor

As well as Atom Bomb Blues, 2005 saw the publication of: Script Doctor – The Inside Story of Doctor Who 1986–89, an account of his work on the Doctor Who television series; Through Time: An Unofficial and Unauthorised History of Doctor Who; and two 2000 AD spin-off novels, Judge Dredd: Swine Fever and Strontium Dog: Day of the Dogs.

Cartmel has also written a novel set in the world of Patrick McGoohan's The Prisoner television series for Powys Media. The novel, released on 15 February 2008, is entitled Miss Freedom.

Common themes and techniques in Cartmel's novels include: animal rights; the use of animal perspectives; and extended metaphors of animal behaviour. These elements appear in the three Virgin New Adventures novels, the original novel The Wise, the Judge Dredd novel Swine Fever and the audio play Animal.

In 2001 Cartmel briefly returned to television as script editor on the second season of Channel 5's fantasy / adventure series Dark Knight, writing what proved to be the final episode of the series.

His first stage play, End of the Night, a thriller with gothic overtones, was produced by Long Shadow Productions in the summer of 2003.

In 2007 Cartmel was a finalist in the Nicotinell 'Lose the Smoke Keep the Fire' Stand Up Comedy Auditions.

== Bibliography ==
=== Comics ===
- Doctor Who (in Doctor Who Magazine #164–166, 175–178, 180 & 188–190, 1990–92)
- Doctor Who: Evening's Empire (in Doctor Who Classic Comics Autumn Holiday Special 1993)
- Judge Dredd (in Judge Dredd Megazine vol.3 #11–12, 1995)
- Doctor Who: Phantom Freight (in Doctor Who Fan Fiction Illustrated as a special guest author, upcoming)
- Rivers of London:

- Body Work #1-5 (2015)
- Night Witch #1-5 (2016)
- Black Mould #1-5 (2016-2017)
- Detective Stories #1-4 (2017)
- Cry Fox #1-4 (2017)
- Water Weed #1-4 (2018)
- Action at a Distance #1-4 (2018)
- The Fey and the Furious #1-4 (2019-2020)
- Monday, Monday #1-4 (2021)

=== Novels ===
- Doctor Who: Cat's Cradle: Warhead (1992)
- Doctor Who: Warlock (1995)
- Doctor Who: Warchild (1996)
- The Wise (1999)
- Judge Dredd: Swine Fever (2005)
- Strontium Dog: Day of the Dogs (2005)
- Doctor Who: Atom Bomb Blues (2005)
- The Prisoner: Miss Freedom (Published February 2008)
- The Rupert Hood Spy Thrillers: Operation Herod (2012)
- The Rupert Hood Spy Thrillers: Event Driven (2012)
- The Vinyl Detective: Written in Dead Wax (2016)
- The Vinyl Detective: The Run-Out Groove (2017)
- The Vinyl Detective: Victory Disc (2018)
- The Vinyl Detective: Flip Back (2019)
- The Vinyl Detective: Low Action (2020)
- The Vinyl Detective: Attack and Decay (2022)
- The Paperback Sleuth: Death in Fine Condition (2023)
- The Vinyl Detective: Noise Floor (2024)
- The Paperback Sleuth: Ashram Assassin (2024)
- The Vinyl Detective: Underscore (2025)
- The Paperback Sleuth: Like a Bullet (2025)

=== Novellas ===
- Doctor Who: Foreign Devils (2002)

=== Audio stories ===
- Doctor Who: Winter for the Adept (2000)
- Doctor Who: Crime of the Century (2011)
- Doctor Who: Animal (2011)
- Doctor Who: Earth Aid (2011) co-written with Ben Aaronovitch.

=== Television ===
- Dark Knight: "Shameer" (2002)

Preceded by Eric Saward	Doctor Who Script Editor; 1987–89	Succeeded by Elwen Rowlands
