= Blood Harvest (Dicks novel) =

1994 novel by Terrance Dicks

- Author: Terrance Dicks
- Cover artist: Bill Donohoe
- Series: Doctor Who book: Virgin New Adventures
- Release number: 28
- Subject: Featuring: Seventh Doctor; Ace, Benny
- Publisher: Virgin Books
- Publication date: July 1994
- ISBN: 0-426-20417-4
- Preceded by: All-Consuming Fire
- Followed by: Strange England

Blood Harvest is an original novel written by Terrance Dicks and based on the long-running British science fiction television series Doctor Who. It features vampires in common with Dicks's 1980 television serial State of Decay and makes reference to that story's events as well as to those of "The Five Doctors". The events of this story are concluded in the first of the Virgin Missing Adventures novel Goth Opera by Paul Cornell. A prelude to the novel, also penned by Dicks, appeared in Doctor Who Magazine #214.

== Plot ==
While the Seventh Doctor and Ace team up with a hard bitten PI in 1929 Chicago, Bernice is stranded on a vampire-infested world with the Doctor's former companion Romana.

The chief monster is a supernaturally powerful creature called Agonal, an elemental who feeds on agony and death and so seeks as much of it as he can. Rassilon traps Agonal in his tomb, just as he trapped Borusa in the television story "The Five Doctors".

== Continuity ==
- The novel features Borusa who at the end of "The Five Doctors" was trapped in the tomb of Rassilon. There is an apparent contradiction between this story and Dicks's later novel The Eight Doctors, wherein Borusa again escapes the tomb; however, The Eight Doctors does not explicitly reveal Borusa's subsequent fate, and there is reason to suppose that he was re-interred, finally released forever in Blood Harvest.
- The private detective Dekker reappears in Dicks's later BBC Books Past Doctor Adventures novel Players.
- Romana first escapes E-space in this novel.
- The Fifth Doctor novel Goth Opera is written as a sequel to this novel.
