= White Darkness (novel) =

1993 novel by David A. McIntee

- Author: David A. McIntee
- Cover artist: Peter Elson
- Series: Doctor Who book: Virgin New Adventures
- Release number: 15
- Subject: Featuring: Seventh Doctor; Ace, Bernice
- Publisher: Virgin Books
- Publication date: June 1993
- ISBN: 0-426-20395-X
- Preceded by: Lucifer Rising
- Followed by: Shadowmind

White Darkness is an original novel written by David A. McIntee and based on the long-running British science fiction television series Doctor Who. It features the Seventh Doctor, Ace and Bernice. A prelude to the novel, also penned by McIntee, appeared in Doctor Who Magazine No. 201.

== Synopsis ==
The Doctor's last three visits to the scattered human colonies of the third millennium have not been entirely successful. And now that Ace has rejoined him and Bernice, life on board the TARDIS is getting pretty stressful. The Doctor yearns for a simpler time and place: Earth, the tropics, the early twentieth century.

The TARDIS lands in Haiti in the early years of the First World War. The Doctor, Bernice, and Ace land in a murderous plot involving voodoo, violent death, zombies and German spies. And perhaps something else—something far, far worse.

== Reception ==
In 1994, Science Fiction Chronicle's Don D'Ammassa critiqued the novel as ""[a] very different tone for the Doctor that works some of the time, but occasionally fails to ring true to the character."
