= Toy Soldiers (novel) =

1995 novel by Paul Leonard

- Author: Paul Leonard
- Cover artist: Peter Elson
- Series: Doctor Who book: Virgin New Adventures
- Release number: 42
- Subject: Featuring: Seventh Doctor; Bernice, Chris, Roz
- Publisher: Virgin Books
- Publication date: September 1995
- ISBN: 0-426-20452-2
- Preceded by: Zamper
- Followed by: Head Games

Toy Soldiers is an original novel written by Paul Leonard and based on the long-running British science fiction television series Doctor Who. The book was published in 1995. It features the Seventh Doctor, Bernice, Chris and Roz.

== Synopsis ==
The Doctor, Benny, Chris and Roz are in Europe in the aftermath of World War I. Children are going missing and it is tied to an alien world that has been going through its own war.
