= Nightshade (Gatiss novel) =

1992 novel by Mark Gatiss

- Author: Mark Gatiss
- Cover artist: Peter Elson
- Series: Doctor Who book: Virgin New Adventures
- Release number: 8
- Subject: Featuring: Seventh Doctor; Ace
- Publisher: Virgin Books
- Publication date: August 1992
- ISBN: 0-426-20376-3
- Preceded by: Cat's Cradle: Witch Mark
- Followed by: Love and War

Nightshade is an original novel written by Mark Gatiss and based on the long-running British science fiction television series Doctor Who. It features the Seventh Doctor and Ace. A prelude to the novel, also penned by Gatiss, appeared in Doctor Who Magazine #190.

== Premise ==
The Doctor and Ace end up in the village of Crook Marsham in 1968. The Doctor contemplates retiring and Ace falls in love with local boy Robin Yeadon. In a nearby retirement home, Edmund Trevithick, who once played the fictional character known as Professor Nightshade in the BBC TV series of the same title, begins to see other fictional characters from the programme as if they were real. The Doctor realizes that Crook Marsham has had many unexplained deaths throughout history. The villagers are then plagued by appearances of lost loved ones.
