= Damaged Goods (Davies novel) =

1996 novel by Russell T. Davies

- Author: Russell T Davies
- Cover artist: Bill Donohoe
- Series: Doctor Who book: Virgin New Adventures
- Release number: 55
- Subject: Featuring: Seventh Doctor; Chris, Roz
- Set in: Period between The Death of Art and So Vile a Sin
- Publisher: Virgin Books
- Publication date: October 1996
- ISBN: 0-426-20483-2
- Preceded by: The Death of Art
- Followed by: Bad Therapy (publication)

Damaged Goods is an original Doctor Who novel, released by Virgin Publishing in their New Adventures range of Doctor Who books in 1996. It was the first piece of full-length prose fiction to have been published by the television scriptwriter Russell T Davies, who later became the chief writer and executive producer of the Doctor Who television series when it was revived in 2005. Davies's first professionally published fiction, a novelisation of his children's television serial Dark Season, had been released by BBC Books in 1991.

In July 2014 it was announced that Big Finish Productions were to produce an audio drama adaptation of the novel, as part of their licensed Doctor Who range. The adaptation was released in April 2015, available as a standalone title, or in a special box set with an adaptation of Gareth Roberts's Fourth Doctor novel The Well-Mannered War.

== Plot ==
The novel is set in Britain in 1987, and involves the Seventh Doctor and his companions Chris Cwej and Roz Forrester living on a working-class council estate while attempting to track down an infinitely powerful Gallifreyan weapon before it falls into the wrong hands. A young boy living on the estate, Gabriel Tyler, appears to be the focus of strange powers, and also for the attentions of Eva Jericho, whose own grievously ill young son seems to be linked to Gabriel in some way, through a secret Gabriel's mother Winnie has long tried to hide.

== Background ==
Davies had already established himself as a successful writer of children's television by 1996, having penned well-received serials such as Dark Season (1991) and Century Falls (1993), and winning a BAFTA Children's Award for an episode of Children's Ward, a series he both wrote for and produced from 1992 to 1995. A staff scriptwriter at Granada Television, he was beginning to move into adult television, writing for soap operas such as Families and Revelations, the latter of which he created.

Despite being a professional writer and long-time Doctor Who fan, Davies had no initial interest in writing for Virgin's Doctor Who novel series, concentrating instead on his television career. However, in 1995 he was interviewed about Dark Season and Century Falls by journalist David Richardson of TV Zone magazine, who later wrote about their meeting. "When we first spoke back in 1995, Davies's interest in writing for the series was evident. With Doctor Who out of production, I suggested he'd be an ideal choice to write one of the novels, and gave him a contact at Virgin Publishing." However, Davies's friend and fellow writer Paul Cornell, who had written several novels for the New Adventures range, later claimed to have been the one responsible for enabling Davies to contribute to the series. "At the time he'd only just started to do The Grand, and we were very much on the same level. We swapped favours — he got me onto Children's Ward, and I introduced him to [Virgin Books editor] Rebecca Levene so he could get to do Damaged Goods."

Davies himself gave his own account of the book's origins in Doctor Who Magazine's 2002 history of the New Adventures range. "I first thought of writing a New Adventure when David Richardson interviewed me for TV Zone... I bashed out the first two chapters in my spare time. I sent in this dead lazy submission, which just said, 'I've got no idea what happens in the end, but trust me. I write'. The arrogance of youth!"

However, Davies found himself commissioned to write for the range by Levene, with his book forming part of the 'Psi-Powers' arc which was overarching the storyline of the novels at the time, although Davies claimed: "I'm not sure I completely understood the Brotherhood arc to be honest! I just kept it vague and hoped someone else would make sense of it."

== Themes ==
There are several aspects of Damaged Goods which contain elements present throughout much of Davies's other work. The inclusion of a family named Tyler, in particular, is a trademark of the writer — Tylers also appear in Revelations, Queer as Folk, The Second Coming and the 2005 re-launch of Doctor Who itself.

The scene in which Mrs Jericho prepares a dinner laced with rat poison for her husband is replicated almost exactly in the concluding episode of Davies's 2003 religious telefantasy drama The Second Coming, where the leading character of Judith prepares a similarly poisoned meal for her lover Steve. There is an even more direct link to Dark Season, with the novel's epilogue featuring a mention of the main character, Marcie, from that serial.

Damaged Goods contains a gay character, David, and homosexuality is a recurring theme explored in much of Davies's writing, as he himself noted in an article for The Guardian newspaper in 2003. "The first gay character I ever wrote was a Devil-worshipping Nazi lesbian in a Children's BBC thriller, Dark Season. She was too busy taking over the world to do anything particularly lesbian, though she did keep a Teutonic Valkyrie by her side at all times... Once I'd started, I never stopped... I even wrote a Doctor Who novel in which the six-foot blond, blue-eyed companion interrupts the hunt for an interdimensional Gallifreyan War Machine to get a blowjob in the back of a taxi. Like you do."

Davies's major breakthrough television series, Queer as Folk (1999), was centred around the lives of three gay men in Manchester, one of whom, Vince Tyler, is portrayed as a fanatical Doctor Who fan. Although never clearly seen on screen, part of the set dressing for Vince's bedroom as seen in the first episode of the series was a copy of Damaged Goods, included as an in-joke by the set dressers. Damaged Goods itself contains a reference to Why Don't You?, a BBC children's television series on which Davies was working at the time the novel is set.

The Doctor Who Annual 2006, published by Panini in August 2005, contained an article entitled Meet the Doctor by Davies, which referred to "N-Forms" being one of the weapons used in the Time War referred to in the 2005 series of Doctor Who. "N-Forms" are the ancient Time Lord weapons which are featured in the plot of Damaged Goods.

== Reviews ==
Reviewing the novel in his Shelf Life column in Doctor Who Magazine, the magazine's resident book critic Dave Owen was extremely positive about Damaged Goods. "Author Russell T Davies is a welcome new addition to Doctor Who fiction, bringing a lucid, matter-of-fact style of storytelling that has more in common with Stephen Gallagher's modern horror novels than Irvine Welsh's stylised fables... Purists might argue that a book full of sex, drugs and squalor can't really be Doctor Who, but they would be forgetting that the essence of the series and those like it is in portraying ordinary people's reactions to the unprecedented. It's done so brilliantly here that, much as I abhor scores, rankings and superlatives, I'll admit that Damaged Goods is currently my favourite New Adventure."

In 1998, Doctor Who Magazine ran a one-off readers' poll to find the most popular New Adventures as part of their celebrations of Doctor Who's 35th anniversary. Damaged Goods received votes from 780 readers, with an average score of 7.295 out of 10, placing it thirteenth out of the sixty-one novels in the series.

== Adaptations ==
After having been commissioned to write the novel, Davies had originally planned to take three months off writing for television in order to complete it. He was then also commissioned to write for two major ITV television series, leaving him very short of time in which to complete the book, eventually writing the manuscript in only five weeks. This sudden amount of work did, however, have the unexpected result of Granada Television purchasing the media rights for the novel on 2 February 1997, with a view to Davies possibly scripting a television adaptation for them.

"Granada lent me a researcher, Maria Grimley, to do all the leg-work on the novel, just so I could finish on time ... This led to various Granada folk reading Damaged Goods and suggesting that the Mrs Jericho story would make a good thriller in its own right. It would have stripped out all the sci-fi stuff — including the Doctor, obviously! — and been cut back to just the story of the twins separated at birth... I think the treatment was called The Mother War. Nothing happened with that because I was just too busy on The Grand."

— Russell T Davies

In July 2014, it was announced that Big Finish Productions were to produce an audio drama adaptation of Damaged Goods, as part of their official range of Doctor Who audio dramas licensed by the BBC. The adaptation was scripted by Jonathan Morris and produced by David Richardson, whose TV Zone interview with Davies in 1995 had in part led to the original book being commissioned by Virgin in the first place. As in the original television series, the role of the Seventh Doctor was played by Sylvester McCoy. The Doctor's companions in the novel, Roz and Chris, were played by Yasmin Bannerman and Travis Oliver, with Michelle Collins as Winnie Tyler and Denise Black as Eva Jericho. The adaptation included additional references to elements from the revived television series, such as the Last Great Time War and the Torchwood Institute, both of which were devised by Davies after the original novel's release.
