= Paul Leonard (writer) =

British writer

Paul J. Leonard Hinder, published as Paul Leonard and originally P.J.L. Hinder, is an author best known for his work on various spin-off fiction based on the long-running British science fiction television series Doctor Who.

Leonard has acknowledged a debt to his friend and fellow Doctor Who author Jim Mortimore in his writing career, having turned to Mortimore for help and advice at the start of it. This advice led to his first novel, Venusian Lullaby being published as part of Virgin Publishing's Missing Adventures range in 1994. Virgin published three more of his novels before losing their licence to publish Doctor Who fiction: Dancing the Code (1995); Speed of Flight (1996) and (as part of their New Adventures range) Toy Soldiers (1995). Following the loss of their licence, Virgin also published the novel Dry Pilgrimage (co-written with Nick Walters) in 1998 as part of their Bernice Summerfield range of novels.

Leonard also wrote for the fourth volume of Virgin's Decalog short story collections. Following this, he was asked to co-edit the fifth volume of the collection with mentor Jim Mortimore.

Leonard's experience in writing for Doctor Who led to him being asked to write one of the first novels in BBC Books Eighth Doctor Adventures series, the novel Genocide. This led to four further novels for the range, of which The Turing Test received particular acclaim for its evocative use of real-life historical characters and first person narrative.

Leonard has also written short stories for the BBC Short Trips and Big Finish Short Trips collections.
