= The Also People =

1995 novel by Ben Aaronovitch

- Author: Ben Aaronovitch
- Cover artist: Tony Masero
- Series: Doctor Who book: Virgin New Adventures
- Release number: 44
- Subject: Featuring: Seventh Doctor; Bernice, Chris, Roz, Kadiatu
- Publisher: Virgin Books
- Publication date: November 1995
- ISBN: 0-426-20456-5
- Preceded by: Head Games
- Followed by: Shakedown

The Also People is an original novel written by Ben Aaronovitch and based on the long-running British science fiction television series Doctor Who. It features the Seventh Doctor, Bernice, Chris, Roz and Kadiatu.

== Plot ==
The Prologue relates a fable in which a leopard becomes caught in a trap. None of the animals will release the creature because they fear she will eat them, until a woman passes by and makes the leopard promise not to hurt her if she frees her. Once free the leopard goes back on her promise and begins hunting the woman, arguing that her brothers built the trap and that killing is part of her nature. Unable to get help from the other animals, the woman eventually encounters the clever hare Tsuro, who tricks the leopard back into the trap, from where she again begins to shout for help. Tsuro turns to the woman and asks whether or not they should free her.

Following events on Detrios, the Doctor takes his companions on a holiday to the Worldsphere, a Dyson Sphere that is the home of the massively technologically advanced race called the People. The People are an amalgam of several different races that have evolved to an incredibly advanced state where they can change their form and sex at will. The sphere is also home to several different kinds of AI, including the governing computer called God, spherical drones and various starships that orbit the sphere. Even household objects such as tables and baths have their own personalities. The People are so technologically advanced that they have a non-aggression treaty with the Time Lords. The travellers move into a deserted villa that overlooks the town of iSanti Jeni and wake up the following morning to find their every whim and desire catered to. Benny makes friends with local baker saRa!qava and Chris begins a romantic relationship with her daughter Dep. Despite his earlier claims the Doctor has a very serious reason for visiting the Worldsphere—in a nearby wilderness he has hidden Kadiatu Lethbridge-Stewart under the guard of the drone aM!xitsa. After she disappeared into the Time Vortex the Doctor tracked her down on board a slave ship in the Atlantic, reduced to a feral state where she attacks and kills anyone who approaches her. The Doctor brought her here for safety but fears that she is too dangerous to be kept alive. That night a thunder storm rages across the bay.

The following night saRa!qava invites them to a party at the local power facility which has been made to resemble a set of windmills. Whilst the others mingle, Roz is the only one who feels uncomfortable in the peace and quiet of her surroundings. This is not helped when she accidentally consumes a mood enhancing drink that causes her to relive the death of her partner Martle. She also unwittingly becomes a cult figure when she throws up over an alien creature that resembles a cockroach, something that the People find fascinating. She bumps into another guest feLixi, who claims to understand her feelings. He is a veteran of the war the People recently fought against an insectoid race and witnessed the death of his lover. Meanwhile, Chris and Dep are too busy playing an electronic game to notice a strange electrical discharge for one of the windmills.

The morning after, two agents of the ship !C-mel arrive and inform the group that during the thunderstorm a drone called vi!Cari was killed by a lightning strike which somehow penetrated the drone's shielding. Itself another war veteran, vi!Cari had withdrawn from society and become increasingly unpopular after the death of its partner. Popular opinion blames vi!Cari for causing the micro-tsunami that destroyed local artist beRut's mural on iSenti Jeni's harbour wall. God was busy conducting surveillance and cannot explain what the drone was doing out in a storm. The Doctor volunteers to investigate and discover if vi!Cari was murdered. The Doctor and Chris use a biplane to fly over the crime site and are forced to land on a nearby ocean liner when they run out of fuel. Re-supplied they return to the skies and the Doctor parachutes down to the ground. Meeting up with saRa!qava and Benny, the Doctor outlines his theory that vi!Cari's shields were damaged by specifically designed lightning strikes.

Kadiatu experiences a nightmare in which her creators threaten to put her back in her box and takes shelter in the villa. Benny recognises Kadiatu and realises that the Doctor has brought her here despite his claims to the contrary. The Doctor admits that he is unsure what to do with her and is especially worried that various trans-temporal entities might be attracted to her. There are only two solutions—turn her into a Time Lord, or painlessly kill her. Benny refuses to allow this, so the Doctor decides to make it her choice and gives her two days to make up her mind.

The Doctor's presence disturbs the millions of ships in orbit within the sphere, since they cannot predict his actions. !C-mel nearly convinces the ships to go to war against the Time Lords, but the Doctor manages to talk the ships down. The Doctor questions an intelligent fish Chris has caught, and it confirms that a depth charge caused the micro-tsunami. The Doctor believes that vi!Cari was out in the storm looking for evidence that proved itself innocent of destroying the mural. He dispatches Roz and Chris to interview some of the ships, but Roz loses her patience when the first one, S-Lioness, answers her questions before she asks them. Roz manages to learn that many ships suffered psychological effects from the war, including the ship R-Vene which requested to be dismantled after two of its crew were killed. It was this ship that vi!Cari served on. The Doctor believes that the People would not simply destroy the ship and concludes that the ship was rebuilt and given a new identity to help it recover. Roz shares this information with feLixi, who has begun to write poems for her. He shows her a garden area he has created and the two have sex.

Benny finds her decision about Kadiatu harder to make than she thought and she begins to experience bad dreams. saRa!qava takes Benny on a shopping trip, and reveals that she had a reason to kill vi!Cari, since the drone discovered that she had conceived Dep without her partners permission. Such a crime is punishable by social ostracism in the People's culture. She wants to share this information with the Doctor. Unknown to her, Dep commits the same crime. When she and Chris have sex, Dep secretly manipulates her own biology so that conceives a child. When the Doctor and Benny arrive for the meeting with saRa!qava, the pair are attacked by a swarm of microscopic drones that attempt to eat anything in their path. The Doctor and Benny survive long enough for God to intervene. saRa!qava protests that she is not responsible. The Doctor reveals he already knows that—only a ship could build such a weapon and monitor her calls.

Back at the glade where he has hidden Kadiatu, aM!xitsa performs a routine brain scan. He is hit by a virus created from Kadiatu's own brain patterns, allowing her to escape. By the time the TARDIS crew learn of this she has reached the town and is apparently attacking beRut. In fact, beRut is the one attacking her as she has graffitied his new mural with the phrase "I AM NOT A NUMBER, I AM A FREE-WHEELING UNICYCLE". Kadiatu has overcome her genetic programming and is not longer compelled to kill. Free at last, she begins dancing on the beach with Roz and the others joining in. As the party ends, the Doctor spots the windmills and realises that they could have been the source of the blast, explaining the energy discharge during the earlier party. It occurs to Roz that vi!Cari might have kept a diary to cope with its isolation. She confronts S-Lioness, who confesses that her behaviour during their earlier encounter was to mask that it has vi!Cari's diary.

As Roz leaves !C-mel moves in and holds her hostage along with the rest of the crew. To prevent God attacking it, !C-mel moves inside the Sphere. It admits that it is the re-engineered R-Vene and threatens to use its weapons against the several trillion inhabitants of the sphere unless the Doctor grants it asylum. The Doctor exchanges himself for all the hostages and then suggests that they link telepathically to save time. In doing so !C-mel unwitting downloads the virus Kadiatu attacked aM!xitsa with and begins to break up. Roz makes it to safety, while the Doctor falls out of the ship, only to be caught by the parachute he befriended earlier.

Having read the diary, Roz confronts feLixi, who reveals that his lover who died in the war was vi!Cari's partner and he blamed the drone for her death. He convinced !C-mel that vi!Cari had found its secret and manipulated the ship into killing the drone. Roz also accuses him of slipping her the flashback drink at the party and faking affection for her in order to get close to the Doctor. He denies this and says that his feelings are genuine, but Roz walks away. feLixi's is punished by being ostracized from society. The Doctor injects Kadiatu with Time Lord DNA that stabilises her genetic code and allows her to travel freely in time. Benny tells the Doctor about her dreams and outlines a theory of her own that she has developed—since all the Doctor's companions are linked through the TARDIS's telepathic circuits, Benny suspects that her agonising over Kadiatu's fate and eventually deciding to let her live filtered through to Kadiatu's mind and helped her overcome her programming. Benny believes this was the Doctor's plan all along, but he says that they just got lucky. The crew remain on the sphere for several more days before leaving in the TARDIS, unaware that Dep is pregnant with Chris's child. Kadiatu leaves for her own travels accompanied by aM!xitsa.

The epilogue relates another fable of Tsuro the hare and his ancient enemy the snake, Danhamakatu. Through his cleverness, Tsuro frees the leopard from her influence and in revenge Danhamakatu promises to take the life of one of his friends. Tsuro however, laughs, thinking that he has tricked her again. By the time she strikes he will have been able to think up a plan to save his friend. But the woman is worried; what if he cannot think up a plan this time?

== Continuity ==
It features cameos (in a dream sequence) by a Dalek, a Cyberman and a Sontaran. (beginning of chapter 10)

The novel features Kadiatu Lethbridge-Stewart, continuing her story from Aaronovitch's earlier novel Transit, as well as Set Piece by Kate Orman.

The epilogue sets up Roz's eventual death in So Vile a Sin.

Each chapter begins with a quote from a fictional song, many of which tie into Doctor Who history, for instance, two are from an LP by Johnny Chess, a 1980s pop star established in earlier books as the son of Ian Chesterton and Barbara Wright, and another is a protest song from a 25th-century "HvLP" titled All The Way From Heaven by Comes The Trickster, a reference to the setting of Love and War.

The phrase "I AM NOT A NUMBER, I AM A FREE-WHEELING UNICYCLE" is a reference to the classic British television series The Prisoner, each episode of which opens with the quote "I am not a number, I am a free man."

=== The People ===
The Also People introduces a race of beings known as "The People", later used in the Bernice Summerfield Virgin New Adventures. The People are a highly advanced society (for example, they live inside a Dyson sphere), with abilities rivalling those of the Time Lords; as such, they have been kept in check by the Time Lords to prevent them from learning the nature of time travel. This had led to tense relations between the Time Lords and The People. The People appear to be a combination of biological and artificial beings; they can switch their forms or their minds at will or even as punishment, one day a humanoid person, the next day the intelligence of a spaceship.

== Influences ==
The title is a quote from The Hitchhiker's Guide to the Galaxy, where in response to Arthur Dent's astonishment at the people and "things" he encounters Ford Prefect remarks that the things are also people.

The society of the People has a very close resemblance to the Culture of Iain M. Banks: the "everything is free" moneyless utopia, the built-in ability of the humanoid citizens to change sex and control their reproduction, the origin of the humanoids as a genofixed merger of several humanoid alien species, the floating intelligent machines known as drones, the intelligent ships and their classifications, the coordination (arguably, quiet rule) of the structure by a single superintelligent computer. The influence has been openly acknowledged by Aaronovitch on the Usenet group rec.arts.sf.written; the book itself contains in the Acknowledgements the line "I'd like to remind everyone that while talent borrows and genius steals, New Adventure writers get it off the back of a lorry, no questions asked."
