= Lungbarrow =

1997 novel by Marc Platt

- Author: Marc Platt
- Cover artist: Fred Gambino
- Series: Doctor Who book: Virgin New Adventures
- Release number: 60
- Subject: Featuring: Seventh Doctor; Chris, Romana, Ace, Leela, K-9
- Set in: Period between The Room with No Doors and the television movie
- Publisher: Virgin Books
- Publication date: 20 March 1997
- ISBN: 0-426-20502-2
- Preceded by: The Room with No Doors
- Followed by: Doctor Who (broadcast and chronological order); The Dying Days (novel)

Lungbarrow is an original novel written by Marc Platt and based on the long-running British science fiction television series Doctor Who. Published in Virgin Books' New Adventures range, it was the last of that range to feature the Seventh Doctor.

When all stories of any media under any banner are listed chronologically, this is the last which features the Seventh Doctor as the "current" Doctor, although Paul McGann's Eighth Doctor had already made his televised appearance by the time the novel was published.

== Plot ==
His mind occupied with thoughts of his coming regeneration, the Doctor accidentally returns to Gallifrey and the House of Lungbarrow, where for over 673 years his 44 cousins have been trapped, but mysteriously only six of them are still left. Meanwhile, Chris Cwej is having strange dreams of the past, when the family cast the Doctor out. The Doctor is accused of the murder of the head of the House, but he finds many allies in the form of former companions Ace, Romana, K-9 Mark I, K-9 Mark II and Leela, who have become embroiled in a Celestial Intervention Agency plot to overthrow Romana's presidency. The secrets of the past are catching up to the Doctor—in particular, the secret that links him to a figure from Gallifreyan history known only as the Other.

== Background ==
Lungbarrow wrapped up the last of the continuity of the New Adventures and put the Doctor on course to gather the Master's remains from Skaro, as depicted in the 1996 Doctor Who television movie.

The novel which followed Lungbarrow, Lance Parkin's The Dying Days, featured the Eighth Doctor. When Virgin subsequently lost their licence to print original Doctor Who fiction, they chose to focus on a character from the New Adventures which the BBC did not own, former companion Bernice Summerfield. Lungbarrow serves, in concert with Dying Days, to gradually increase the standing of Summerfield's character, laying the groundwork for the later appearance of the Seventh Doctor's then-companion, Chris Cwej, in Summerfield's own novels.

Platt's novel, though, is largely concerned with concluding what was known as the "Cartmel Masterplan". In the final two seasons of the original 1963-1989 run of Doctor Who, the then script editor Andrew Cartmel introduced new elements of mystery into the character of the Doctor. Suggestions of dark secrets that the Doctor might be more than just a Time Lord were inserted into scripts of stories such as Ben Aaronovitch's Remembrance of the Daleks and Kevin Clarke's Silver Nemesis. Had the series not been effectively cancelled in 1989, the following series would have made some of these revelations. Lungbarrow began life as a television script, which was rejected by John Nathan-Turner on the grounds that it revealed too much about the Doctor and the Time Lords, too quickly. Elements of Platt's planned Lungbarrow instead became part of the Series 26 serial Ghost Light, such as the sinister house keeper, the trapped investigating policeman and finale based around the family dinner. If produced, the story would have featured Ace as the main companion and been set entirely within the House.

Along the way to this resolution, Lungbarrow ultimately reveals much new information about the Doctor's home world and race, some of which had been hinted at ever since the first New Adventures novel. Many of the New Adventures authors migrated to the BBC Books Doctor Who line and elements of this backstory also made their way into subsequent novels. However, there have also been elements in those novels that contradict it.

== Publication history ==
The numbering of this book (60 of 61) refers to the publisher's intended order, not the actual order of publication. Because of chronic delays troubling Ben Aaronovitch's So Vile a Sin (which was eventually finished by Kate Orman), it was actually the 59th New Adventure published.

Lance Parkin on an Outpost Gallifrey forum thread stated in 2005 that the reason the last three books in the Virgin New Adventures range, including Lungbarrow, were so expensive on the secondary market was excessive demand, rather than an unusually low initial print run. However, he also noted that reprints of these books were not allowed, because Virgin's license expired before a second printing might otherwise have been made.

A new version of Lungbarrow, with both additions and subtractions to the original text, author's notes and an artwork gallery, was presented as an e-book on the BBC website from 22 August 2003 to December 2010.

== Continuity ==
- The Seventh Doctor is sent to collect the Master’s remains by Romana, a lead in to the television movie.

== Outside references ==
The Houses that Platt gives Gallifrey are similar to the household featured in Peake's Gormenghast trilogy. Badger, a character who makes his first appearance in Lungbarrow, has much in common with a character in Peake's Gormenghast novella, Boy in Darkness, which originally appeared in the collected work Sometime, Never by Golding, Wyndham and Peake.

== See also ==
- Time Lord - History within the show
- The Doctor and romance
