= Craig Hinton =

British writer (1964–2006)

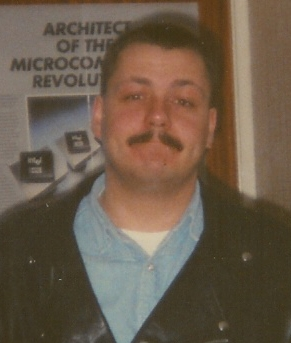
- Craig Hinton, Coventry 1989
- Born: 7 May 1964
- Died: 3 December 2006 (aged 42)
- Writing career
- Genre: science fiction
- Notable work: Doctor Who

Craig Peter Hinton (7 May 1964 – 3 December 2006) was a British writer best known for his work on various spin-offs from the BBC Television series Doctor Who. He also wrote articles for various science fiction magazines, and was the Coordinator of the Doctor Who Appreciation Society. He most recently lived in London, where he taught mathematics. Hinton was found dead in his home on 3 December 2006. The cause of death was given as heart attack.

== Work ==
Hinton first became known for his articles about various science fiction television programmes, including Doctor Who and Star Trek. These brought him to the attention of the editor of Marvel UK's Doctor Who Magazine, who offered him the role of reviewing merchandise for the magazine's Shelf Life section. It was whilst writing for the magazine that Hinton had his first novel published, The Crystal Bucephalus, as part of Virgin Publishing's Missing Adventures range. The book – which Hinton often referred to as "The Crystal Bucket" – was originally submitted for Virgin's New Adventures, and 50,000 words of this version were written before the change was made.

This novel was followed by a further Missing Adventure, Millennial Rites in 1995, and then by Hinton's only New Adventure in 1996, GodEngine, which features the Ice Warriors as well as oblique appearances by the Daleks.

Following Virgin's loss of their licence to produce Doctor Who merchandise, Hinton began submitting proposals to BBC Books and in 2001 they published his novel The Quantum Archangel as part of their Past Doctor Adventures range. This was followed in 2004 by the novel Synthespians™, which again had started life as a proposal for the current incumbent Doctor before being altered to feature a previous Doctor. Synthespians™ also came into difficulties when an image of the television show Dynasty was used on the cover: the cover's creators had arranged for permission to use the copyrighted image, but had neglected to arrange permission to alter it, and so at the last minute a replacement cover had to be produced. It is this that appears on the cover of the novel.

Hinton's Doctor Who novels often contain references to or explanations of elements of past continuity. He was the originator of the term "fanwank", which he applied to his own work.

Hinton also continued to work with Virgin, writing pseudonymously under the name Paul C. Alexander for their Idol range. He authored three books in the range: Chains of Deceit, The Final Restraint and Code of Submission. These titles were a major departure from his science fiction, and explored aspects of his sexuality that were only suggested in his other works.

Hinton wrote for Big Finish Productions' audio adventures, with the play Excelis Decays being produced in 2002 for their Doctor Who range and The Lords of Forever in 2005 for their Tomorrow People range. Hinton also wrote short stories for a variety of their short fiction collections.

Before his death, Hinton had proposed a Doctor Who novel to BBC Books dealing with the final adventure of the Sixth Doctor. His proposal was rejected, but Hinton continued to work on the manuscript. After his death, the novel, Time's Champion, was completed by Chris McKeon, and edited and published by David J. Howe using the facilities of Telos Publishing Ltd., as a benefit for the British Heart Foundation. In addition to this an anthology, Shelf Life (named after his review column), was edited and published by Jay Eales, David A. McIntee and Adrian Middleton, also for the benefit of the British Heart Foundation. A limited edition second printing of Time's Champion was briefly made available in November 2020.

Outside of the science fiction world Hinton was a noted IT journalist in the UK, editing magazines in the mid-1990s for VNU Business Publications in London and moving on to ITNetwork.com shortly afterwards.
