= Missing Adventures =

Missing Adventures may refer to:

- Virgin Missing Adventures, a series of novels based on the television series Doctor Who
- Missing Adventures (Bernice Summerfield anthology), a 2007 anthology edited by Rebecca Levene
