= Gareth Roberts (writer) =

British writer

- Born: Gareth John Pritchard Roberts; 5 June 1968 (age 58)
- Education: King Alfred's College (now the University of Winchester); Liverpool Polytechnic (now Liverpool John Moores University)
- Occupations: Television screenwriter; novelist; columnist

Gareth John Pritchard Roberts (born 5 June 1968) is a British television screenwriter, novelist and columnist best known for his work related to the science-fiction television series Doctor Who. He has also worked on various comedy series and soap operas.

== Early life ==
Roberts studied drama at King Alfred's College (now the University of Winchester) and Liverpool Polytechnic (now Liverpool John Moores University). He has also worked as a clerk at the Court of Appeal.

== Career ==
Roberts has worked on some of the most popular British soap operas, including Channel 4's now-defunct Brookside as a scriptwriter (1999–2003), and as a story associate on ITV's Coronation Street in 1997. In 1998 he worked as a script editor on ITV's other long-running soap, Emmerdale, moving across to write several episodes himself the following year.

=== Doctor Who and others ===
During the 1990s, Roberts was associated with the range of Doctor Who spin-off novels published by Virgin Books. He contributed several novels to both their New Adventures and Missing Adventures ranges of Doctor Who fiction. He also wrote some Cracker novelisations for Virgin, and a gay erotic novel named The Velvet Web under the pseudonym Christopher Summerisle, the title of which also happened to be an episode of the Doctor Who serial The Keys of Marinus.

He continued his association with Doctor Who in the 2000s, penning several feature articles and comic strips for Doctor Who Magazine, co-writing audio plays and short stories based on the series with Clayton Hickman for Big Finish Productions, and in 2005 writing another Doctor Who novel, Only Human, based on the characters from the new series launched that year, for BBC Books' New Series Adventures range. A further novel, I am a Dalek, was released in 2006 and featured the Tenth Doctor. I am a Dalek is part of a Government "Quick Reads initiative". He also co-wrote The New Gods with Rebecca Levene, the first Tomorrow People audio drama for Big Finish.

Roberts appeared as a contributor to the documentary Serial Thrillers, exploring the popular Philip Hinchcliffe era of Doctor Who between 1975 and 1977, which featured as an extra on the 2004 DVD release of the serial Pyramids of Mars.

On 25 December 2005, a special 'interactive' mini-episode of Doctor Who written by Roberts, Attack of the Graske, was broadcast, and can now be accessed on the BBC website (only available to UK Broadband Users). Roberts also wrote a series of "TARDISODEs", short videos available online and via mobile phones promoting the 2006 series of Doctor Who.

He has written four full episodes of Doctor Who, "The Shakespeare Code" in 2007, "The Unicorn and the Wasp" in 2008, "The Lodger" in 2010 and "Closing Time" in 2011. He co-wrote 2014's "The Caretaker" with showrunner Steven Moffat.

Roberts also co-wrote, with Russell T Davies, "Invasion of the Bane", the pilot episode of the Doctor Who spin-off series The Sarah Jane Adventures. He wrote two two-part stories for the full series of The Sarah Jane Adventures, which began broadcasting in the autumn of 2007, and another two two-part stories for the 2008 series.

Roberts co-wrote with Davies again for the second of the 2009 specials of Doctor Who, "Planet of the Dead".

Gareth Roberts has also written a novelisation of Shada, the uncompleted Tom Baker (Fourth Doctor) story written by Douglas Adams, that was due to be the finale of season seventeen of Doctor Who in 1979 before it was abandoned due to industrial action. The book was published by BBC Books on 15 March 2012.

=== Other work ===
In comedy, Roberts has worked in collaboration with The Fast Show writer and performer Charlie Higson on the sitcom Swiss Toni, a spin-off from The Fast Show. He also collaborated with Higson on scripts for the second series of Randall and Hopkirk for BBC One in 2001. He would reteam with Higson for the superhero-style series Jekyll & Hyde, based on the novel. It was not renewed for a second series.

Roberts has also contributed sketches to the Channel Five sketch show Swinging, and wrote for the fantasy series The Librarians.

Roberts and Gary Russell wrote Virgin Books' episode guide to The Simpsons, I Can't Believe It's an Unofficial Simpsons Guide (1997), under the pseudonyms Warren Martyn and Adrian Wood. Text from the book's expanded edition, I Can't Believe It's a Bigger and Better Updated Unofficial Simpsons Guide (2000), was subsequently published on the BBC website's Cult TV section.

== Transgender controversy ==
On 3 September 2017, Roberts posted on his Twitter account, "I [love] how trannies choose names like Munroe, Paris and Chelsea. It's never Julie or Bev is it?" Later that same day he wrote "It's almost like a clueless gayboy's idea of a glamorous lady. But of course it's definitely not that." These comments were condemned by some Twitter users.

In June 2019, it was leaked that Roberts' contribution for a Doctor Who short story collection had been dropped due to his previous tweets, as well as the threat from other writers to withdraw their contributions. Roberts responded with a blog post on Medium in which he stated: "I don't believe in gender identity. It is impossible for a person to change their biological sex."

In a 2023 article for Spiked, Roberts likened gender-affirming healthcare to "drugging and / or mutilation ... carried out by qualified surgeons", described gender dysphoria as "paranoid personality disorders and permanent unhinged smirks", and alleged that in modern society "teenage girls are steered behind their parents' backs towards synthetic hormones and mutilation".

In 2024, he authored Gay Shame: The Rise of Gender Ideology and the New Homophobia, which argued that the transgender rights movement and "gender ideology" is anti-gay. In 2025, Roberts authored a leading article in The Spectator in which he said that "the fall of Pride can't come soon enough", describing LGBT activists as a "rainbow cult" and Pride as a "Grand Guignol spectacle of human irrationality" that "will need a direct, committed, top-down directive to really ... stop". In the article he spoke approvingly of the cancellation of Pride events and the removal of Pride flags from public buildings. Roberts is gay.

== Bibliography ==
=== Books ===
- The Highest Science (Doctor Who New Adventure, 1993)
- Tragedy Day (Doctor Who New Adventure, 1994)
- Zamper (Doctor Who New Adventure, 1995)
- The Romance of Crime (Doctor Who Missing Adventure, 1995)
- To be a Somebody (Cracker novelisation, 1996)
- Best Boys (Cracker novelisation, 1996)
- The English Way of Death (Doctor Who Missing Adventure, 1996)
- The Plotters (Doctor Who Missing Adventure, 1996)
- The Well-Mannered War (Doctor Who Missing Adventure, 1997)
- Only Human (Doctor Who New Series Adventure, 2005)
- I am a Dalek (Doctor Who New Series Adventure, 2006)
- Shada: The Lost Adventure by Douglas Adams (Doctor Who Novelisation, 2012)
- Gay Shame: The Rise of Gender Ideology and the New Homophobia (Forum, 2024)

=== Short stories ===
Short stories in:

- Decalog 2: Lost Property (1995)
- Decalog 3: Consequences (1996)
- More Short Trips (1999)
- Short Trips and Sidesteps (2000)
- Short Trips: The Muses (2003)
- Doctor Who Annual 2006 (2005)
- The Doctor Who Storybook 2007 (2006)

=== Television scripts ===
Production	Notes	Broadcaster
Emmerdale	Several Episodes (1999)	ITV
Springhill	Multiple Episodes (1996–1997)	Channel 4
Brookside	Multiple Episodes (1999–2003)	Channel 4
Randall and Hopkirk	"Whatever Possessed You?" (co-written with Charlie Higson) (2001); "Painkillers" (co-written with Mark Gatiss and Jeremy Dyson) (2001)	BBC One
Swiss Toni	Staff Writer (2003)	BBC Three
Swinging	Staff Writer (2005)	Five
Doctor Who	"Attack of the Graske" (2005); "The Shakespeare Code" (2007); "The Unicorn and the Wasp" (2008); "Planet of the Dead" (co-written with Russell T Davies) (2009); "The Lodger" (2010); "Closing Time" (2011); "The Caretaker" (co-written with Steven Moffat) (2014)	BBC One
The Sarah Jane Adventures	"Invasion of the Bane" (co-written with Russell T Davies) (2007); Revenge of the Slitheen (2007); Whatever Happened to Sarah Jane? (2007); Secrets of the Stars (2008); The Temptation of Sarah Jane Smith (2008); "From Raxacoricofallapatorius with Love" (co-written with Clayton Hickman) (2009); The Wedding of Sarah Jane Smith (2009); The Empty Planet (2010); Goodbye, Sarah Jane Smith (co-written with Clayton Hickman) (2010); The Man Who Never Was (2011)	CBBC
Wizards vs Aliens	Fall of the Necross (2012); The Curse of Crowe (2013)	CBBC
Jekyll & Hyde	"The Incubus" (2015)	ITV
The Librarians	"And the Curse of Cindy" (2017)	TNT
