= Cat's Cradle: Warhead =

1992 novel by Andrew Cartmel

- Author: Andrew Cartmel
- Cover artist: Peter Elson
- Series: Doctor Who book: Virgin New Adventures
- Release number: 6
- Subject: Featuring: Seventh Doctor; Ace
- Publisher: Virgin Books
- Publication date: April 1992
- ISBN: 0-426-20367-4
- Preceded by: Cat's Cradle: Time's Crucible
- Followed by: Cat's Cradle: Witch Mark

Cat's Cradle: Warhead is an original novel written by Andrew Cartmel and based on the long-running British science fiction television series Doctor Who. It features the Seventh Doctor and Ace. This novel is the second book in the Cat's Cradle sequence, and also forms the first part of a trilogy of novels by Cartmel, the others being Warlock and Warchild.

== Plot ==
In the near future, the Earth is on the verge of environmental collapse, and pollution poisons the atmosphere. The point of no return is rapidly approaching, but the Butler Institute has an ingenious solution. Rather than work to restore the environment, the Butler Institute plans to transfer the minds of the super-rich into computers, thus eliminating the need for breathable air and drinkable water.

Many years after he met her on the planet of the Cheetah People (as seen in the televised episode Survival), the Doctor visits Shreela as she is dying in hospital. Shreela, now a science writer, agrees to publish as her own an article the Doctor wrote linking telekinesis to certain blood proteins. The article is later seen by Matthew O'Hara, CEO of a massive corporation called the Butler Institute. O'Hara instructs his Biostock Acquisitions division to forward any individuals exhibiting the relevant blood proteins directly to his research facility in upstate New York. In New York City, a police officer named McIlveen is assassinated by a Butler Institute employee, in front of his partner Mancuso.

The Doctor then visits the King Building in New York City, corporate headquarters of the Butler Institute, and gains access to restricted computer files. Next, the Doctor hires a youth gang to track down Bobby Prescott, an insane murderer who preys on video gamers. Prescott tells the Doctor about a dangerous secret being hidden in an undistinguished metal drum in Turkey. The Doctor sends Ace to Turkey to retrieve the item. In Turkey, Ace hires a band of Kurdish mercenaries to assist her. The drum is being held on an island by a handful of well-armed but inexperienced kids. Ace manages to neutralize the kids without anyone getting hurt, secures the drum, and makes arrangements to return with it to the Doctor in England.

The Doctor takes Ace to his house in Kent, where he explains that the drum contains a young man by the name of Vincent Wheaton. Vincent's life-functions were completely suspended by a chemical gel inside the drum. Vincent has the power to mentally amplify the emotions of others and release the mental energy through telekinesis. The Doctor plans to use Vincent, along with a specially selected emotional trigger, to work as a two-component telekinetic bomb to destroy the Butler Institute research facility. The trigger is Justine, an emotionally unstable environmental activist, lured to Kent by rumors of a supernatural gateway located within it. After Ace gets Vincent out of the drum and brings him back to consciousness, Justine finds him, touches him, and sets off a powerful psychic explosion.

Relocating everyone to New York City, the Doctor's plan is set into motion. Justine drugs Vincent in Central Park, ensuring that he will be picked up by the Butler Institute's Biostock Acquisitions division, where his unusual blood proteins will be detected. Justine meets Ace and the Doctor at a drug store which is about to be robbed. Eager to be reunited with Vincent (with whom she is now in love) Justine takes a suicide pill and collapses before the enraged Doctor. Meanwhile, Mancuso arrives in response to the robbery and arrests the Doctor before he can tell her about her unusual new gun. Ace is arrested by Mancuso's new partner Breen. During a shootout with the gang robbing the drug store, Mancuso's gun swivels on a hidden joint and fires on its own, saving Mancuso's life. Ace is taken into custody by Mancuso's new partner Breen, but the Doctor gets away.

Ace's good health is immediately detected by the Butler Institute, who want to farm her organs for the benefit of the rich. Breen intervenes on Ace's behalf and takes her to Mancuso. The Doctor appears and explains to Mancuso that the mind of her old partner, McIlveen, was downloaded into her new gun. This was a test run for the scheme the Butler Institute will use to immunize the very rich against the further degradation of the planet. The Doctor reveals the pill Justine took did not kill her, but merely simulated death, and that she will soon wake up in the Biostock Acquisitions division of the Butler Institute. Mancuso, Breen, and McIlveen help the Doctor and Ace to rescue Justine from the King Building.

They all travel to the project site, where Justine and Vincent are reunited. However, the Doctor's weapon fails. Her blossoming relationship with Vincent has quieted the emotional storm raging within Justine, and she is no longer capable of fueling his telekinetic power. O'Hara, gloating over the failure of the Doctor's plan, grabs Vincent angrily by the arm. The emotional coldness within O'Hara is amplified by Vincent's power, and a terrible blast of cold destroys both O'Hara and the project site. The Doctor informs O'Hara's corporate partners that the project has failed, and they agree to redirect their efforts toward reversing the environmental damage done to the planet.
