= Shadowmind =

1993 novel by Christopher Bulis

- Author: Christopher Bulis
- Cover artist: Christopher Bulis
- Series: Doctor Who book: Virgin New Adventures
- Release number: 16
- Subject: Featuring: Seventh Doctor; Ace, Bernice
- Publisher: Virgin Books
- Publication date: July 1993
- ISBN: 0-426-20394-1
- Preceded by: White Darkness
- Followed by: Birthright

Shadowmind is an original novel written by Christopher Bulis and based on the long-running British science fiction television series Doctor Who. It was number 16 in the New Adventures and features the Seventh Doctor, Ace and Bernice. A prelude to the novel, also penned by Bulis, appeared in Doctor Who Magazine #202.

== Reception ==
In 1994, Science Fiction Chronicle's Don D'Ammassa reviewed the novel as "an interesting story."
