= Head Games (novel) =

1995 novel by Steve Lyons

- Author: Steve Lyons
- Cover artist: Bill Donohoe
- Series: Doctor Who book: Virgin New Adventures
- Release number: 43
- Subject: Featuring: Seventh Doctor; Bernice, Chris, Roz, Mel, Ace
- Publisher: Virgin Books
- Publication date: October 1995
- ISBN: 0-426-20454-9
- Preceded by: Toy Soldiers
- Followed by: The Also People

Head Games is an original novel written by Steve Lyons and based on the long-running British science fiction television series Doctor Who. It features the Seventh Doctor, Bernice, Chris, Roz, Mel and Ace.

Head Games is a sequel to Lyons' earlier New Adventure Conundrum, and again features the Land of Fiction first seen the 1968 serial The Mind Robber.

Head Games continues a theme running through the New Adventures starting from Timewyrm: Revelation in which the Doctor becomes Time's Champion, and that previous incarnations still in some sense exist within his mind. This novel suggests that the Seventh Doctor was somehow able to terminate the life of his previous incarnation on Lakertya (in the story Time and the Rani) in order to become Time's Champion. This in turn caused the Sixth Doctor to eventually turn into the Valeyard — the evil version of the Doctor seen in the serial The Trial of a Time Lord.

== Plot ==
A flaw in the fabric of the universe allows energy from the Land of Fiction to spill into reality. The Seventh Doctor and his companions travel to seal the breach, which has formed above the dying planet Detrios. Its people have unknowingly drawn on the leaked energy to power their world through a crystal known as the Miracle. Closing the rift will erase the Miracle and plunge the planet into darkness.

Meanwhile, the energy influences Jason, a writer once trapped in the Land of Fiction. His imagination brings into being Dr. Who, a heroic but shallow version of the Doctor whose interventions cause havoc across worlds. While the real Doctor is imprisoned inside one of Jason’s creations, Dr. Who leads Jason on a series of disastrous “adventures” that blur fiction and reality.

The Doctor eventually escapes and confronts both Jason and his duplicate, forcing Jason to accept responsibility for the chaos his fantasies have caused. When Jason renounces his illusions, Dr. Who vanishes and the rift begins to close.

As the Miracle fades, Detrios is left to rebuild without its false source of power. Confronted by the damage caused through Jason’s creations and his own choices, the Doctor reflects on his growing moral burden but resolves to continue his role as Time’s Champion. He parts from several companions, determined to face the wider consequences of the breach and restore balance to the universe.
