= Warlock (Cartmel novel) =

1995 novel by Andrew Cartmel

- Author: Andrew Cartmel
- Cover artist: Tony Masero
- Series: Doctor Who book: Virgin New Adventures
- Release number: 34
- Subject: Featuring: Seventh Doctor; Ace, Bernice
- Publisher: Virgin Books
- Publication date: January 1995
- ISBN: 0-426-20433-6
- Preceded by: Parasite
- Followed by: Set Piece

Warlock is an original novel written by Andrew Cartmel and based on the long-running British science fiction television series Doctor Who. It features the Seventh Doctor, Ace and Bernice. The book is the middle novel in the "War trilogy", following on from Cat's Cradle: Warhead and concluding in Warchild. A prelude to the novel, also penned by Cartmel, appeared in Doctor Who Magazine #221.

== Synopsis ==
A new drug called "Warlock" is tearing apart society. Benny is involved with a law enforcement effort to bring it down while Ace is in trouble in a horrific animal laboratory. Only the Doctor is left to discover the truth behind the new drug.
