= Strange England =

1994 novel by Simon Messingham

- Author: Simon Messingham
- Cover artist: Paul Campbell
- Series: Doctor Who book: Virgin New Adventures
- Release number: 29
- Subject: Featuring: Seventh Doctor; Ace, Bernice
- Publisher: Virgin Books
- Publication date: August 1994
- ISBN: 0-426-20419-0
- Preceded by: Blood Harvest
- Followed by: First Frontier

Strange England is an original novel written by Simon Messingham and based on the long-running British science fiction television series Doctor Who. It features the Seventh Doctor, Ace and Bernice. A prelude to the novel, also penned by Messingham, appeared in Doctor Who Magazine #215.
