= Lucifer Rising (novel) =

1993 novel by Jim Mortimore

- Author: Jim Mortimore, Andy Lane
- Cover artist: Jim Mortimore
- Series: Doctor Who book: Virgin New Adventures
- Release number: 14
- Subject: Featuring: Seventh Doctor; Ace, Bernice
- Publisher: Virgin Books
- Publication date: May 1993
- ISBN: 0-426-20388-7
- Preceded by: Deceit
- Followed by: White Darkness

Lucifer Rising is an original Virgin New Adventures novel written by Jim Mortimore and Andy Lane and based on the long-running British science fiction television series Doctor Who. It features the Seventh Doctor, Ace and Bernice. A prelude to the novel, also penned by Mortimore and Lane, appeared in Doctor Who Magazine #199.
