= Bad Therapy =

1996 novel by Matt Jones

- Author: Matthew Jones
- Cover artist: Mark Salwowski
- Series: Doctor Who book: Virgin New Adventures
- Release number: 57
- Subject: Featuring: Seventh Doctor; Chris, Peri
- Set in: Period between So Vile a Sin and Eternity Weeps
- Publisher: Virgin Books
- Publication date: December 1996
- ISBN: 0-426-20490-5
- Preceded by: Damaged Goods (publication)
- Followed by: Eternity Weeps

Bad Therapy is an original novel written by Matthew Jones and based on the long-running British science fiction television series Doctor Who. It features the Seventh Doctor, Chris and Peri.

== Synopsis ==
In 1950s London, the Soho district serves as the setting for the recovery from recent traumatic events in the 20th century. The city experiences numerous acts of violence, including the killing of residents by a driverless cab, the murder of residents in strange ritualistic manners, widespread criminal activity, competition between gangs for territory and the formulation of plans deep inside an abandoned mental hospital by a psychiatrist.
