= The Death of Art =

1996 novel by Simon Bucher-Jones

- Author: Simon Bucher-Jones
- Cover artist: Jon Sullivan
- Series: Doctor Who book: Virgin New Adventures
- Release number: 54
- Subject: Featuring: Seventh Doctor; Chris, Roz, Ace
- Publisher: Virgin Books
- Publication date: September 1996
- ISBN: 0-426-20481-6
- Preceded by: Return of the Living Dad
- Followed by: Damaged Goods

The Death of Art is a novel by Simon Bucher-Jones published in 1996 and based on the long-running British science fiction television series Doctor Who. It features the Seventh Doctor, Chris, Roz and Ace. It is part of the Psi Powers series of novels.

== Synopsis ==
The Doctor and his assistants, Roz and Chris, travel to 1880s France, the corrupt world of the French Third Republic. A rip in time threatens Paris, a race struggles to free itself from oppression, and a strange brotherhood fights a battle for power.
