= Virgin New Adventures =

Novels based on Doctor Who (1991–1999)

The Virgin New Adventures (NA series, or NAs) are a series of novels from Virgin Publishing based on the British science-fiction television series Doctor Who. They continued the story of the Doctor from the point at which the television programme went into hiatus from television in 1989.

From 1991 to 1997, all the books except the final one involved the Seventh Doctor, who was portrayed on television by Sylvester McCoy; the final book, The Dying Days, involved the Eighth Doctor, who was portrayed in the 1996 television film by Paul McGann. In further books published between 1997 and 1999, the New Adventures series focused on the character Bernice Summerfield and the Doctor did not appear.

== Publication history ==
=== Doctor Who ===
Virgin had purchased the successful children's imprint Target Books in 1989, with Virgin's new fiction editor Peter Darvill-Evans taking over the range. Target's major output was novelisations of televised Doctor Who stories, and Darvill-Evans realised that there were few stories left to be novelised. He approached the BBC for permission to commission original stories written directly for print, but such a licence was initially refused. However, after the television series ended at the end of 1989, Virgin were granted the licence to produce full-length original novels continuing the story from the point at which the series had concluded.

The range, titled the New Adventures, was launched in 1991 with a series of four linked novels, beginning with Timewyrm: Genesys by John Peel, who had previously contributed to Target's successful range of novelisations. Of the other three initial authors, Terrance Dicks had been both a regular contributor to the television series itself and the major contributor to Target's book range; Nigel Robinson had been Darvill-Evans' predecessor as editor of the Target books; and Paul Cornell, although new to professional publishing, had been an active contributor to the Doctor Who fanzine scene and was beginning a career as a television scriptwriter.

The initial four Timewyrm books were successful, and the range quickly became a regular bi-monthly series. Starting with book #11, The Highest Science, in February 1993, Virgin switched to a monthly publication schedule. In July 1994, Virgin began a companion range of novels, the Missing Adventures, which told stories of previous incarnations of the Doctor.

Following the Doctor Who television movie in 1996 the BBC chose not to renew Virgin's licence to produce Doctor Who novels, choosing instead to publish their own line of original Doctor Who fiction. After 61 New Adventures and 33 Missing Adventures, Doctor Who fiction came to an end at Virgin with The Dying Days, their only Eighth Doctor novel. However, the final Doctor Who book actually published by Virgin was So Vile a Sin, featuring the Seventh Doctor; it had been scheduled for release several months before The Dying Days but was delayed due to difficulties with the manuscript.

=== Bernice Summerfield ===
The New Adventures series continued with Bernice Summerfield, one of the new companions introduced for the New Adventures, as the lead character, starting with her taking up a job as professor of archaeology at the St Oscar's University on the planet of Dellah.

A meeting was held at Virgin in mid-July 1996 with the New Adventures editorial team, Peter Darvill-Evans, Rebecca Levene and Simon Winstone, and several regular writers for the series: Paul Cornell, Gareth Roberts, Andy Lane, Lance Parkin and Justin Richards. This was to plan the basics of the Benny books. Parkin's The Dying Days as then tasked with getting the character of Benny to 2593.

The new line was written by many of the writers that had written for the New Adventures and continued to feature elements of both the Doctor Who New Adventures and, to a lesser extent, television continuity. Indeed, its concluding arc – the so-called "Gods arc", which sees an alien race with god-like powers devastating Dellah – ties in with concurrent events in the BBC Eighth Doctor line. The links between the NA Dead Romance (a standalone volume in which Bernice Summerfield does not actually appear) and the two-volume Eighth Doctor novel Interference (all written by Lawrence Miles) are particularly close.

== Storytelling ==
The New Adventures were self-described as being "stories too broad and deep for the small screen," and purported to take Doctor Who into "previously unexplored realms of time and space". What this meant, in practice, was a shift towards more adult-oriented science fiction writing, and use of the literary form to play around with the standard conventions of the series. From the beginning, the novels were controversial for their use of sex, violence and bad language.

Among the developments were a "hardening" of Ace, with a story arc that had her leave the Doctor for three years (from her perspective) and returning as an older and more cynical character, more morally ambiguous endings and the introduction of new companions, such as Bernice and the Adjudicators Chris Cwej and Roz Forrester. Bernice, in particular, proved so popular that in addition to appearing in her own novels, she has gone on to star in her own audio plays as well.

The novels were guided by the so-called Cartmel Masterplan, which was the backstory that Doctor Who story editor Andrew Cartmel had constructed for the television series when it was cancelled and never brought to fruition. Hints were therefore dropped about the "true" nature of the Seventh Doctor, which culminated in the penultimate novel in the Virgin series, Lungbarrow, written by Marc Platt. That said, neither of the main editors of the line, Peter Darvill-Evans or Rebecca Levene took the Masterplan as an absolute, preferring to develop those themes by tone rather than plot. Only a handful of books in the line are heavily based around the Masterplan.

One novel in the series, Shakedown, was in fact a novelisation of an independent video production that had featured the Sontarans. The production team had licensed the use of the Sontarans and Rutans, but had not included the Doctor due to lack of copyright. The novelisation of Shakedown, however, was expanded to include the Doctor. (Similarly, the NA's sister series, the Missing Adventures, included novelisations of the spin-off production, Downtime and the BBC Radio drama The Ghosts of N-Space.)

One novel in the series, All-Consuming Fire, written by Andy Lane, featured a crossover with Arthur Conan Doyle's characters Sherlock Holmes and Dr. Watson, and also with H. P. Lovecraft's Cthulhu Mythos. Editor Peter Darvill-Evans initially told Lane that Holmes and Watson were to become the Doctor's new companions, but this did not happen.

== Writers ==
As well as introducing new characters, the range also provided a showcase for new writing talent. Notable was Paul Cornell who wrote five of the novels, including the single most popular one (according to a Doctor Who Magazine poll), Human Nature. Cornell went on to write for the 2005 revival of the television series: "Father's Day" and "Human Nature"/"The Family of Blood", the latter a two-part adaptation of the 38th New Adventure. Others who later worked on the revived television series include Mark Gatiss, Gareth Roberts, Matt Jones, Simon Winstone and Gary Russell. Even Russell T Davies contributed to the range with his novel Damaged Goods. Gatiss and Roberts both did their first ever professional fiction writing for the line, as did others who later found success elsewhere, including Daniel Blythe, Justin Richards, Andy Lane and Lance Parkin.

Several writers from the classic television series also got their chance to contribute – one of the best received novels was The Also People by Ben Aaronovitch. Terrance Dicks, the author of many Target episode novelizations and a writer and script editor for the TV series going back to the 1960s, contributed a number of novels. Barry Letts, former producer of the series during the Jon Pertwee era, contributed to the Virgin Missing Adventures line.

Despite moving to the BBC line of novels, the writers (many who cut their teeth with the Virgin series) attempted to maintain continuity with the Virgin range and many elements from this series appeared in later Doctor Who stories. With Big Finish Productions acquiring the licence to produce both Doctor Who and Bernice Summerfield audio plays and short fiction, they have been able to set audio plays within the universe of the Virgin novel line, as is the case with The Shadow of the Scourge and The Dark Flame, for example. Although the continuity of the audio plays and the BBC's Eighth Doctor Adventures diverge sharply from each other, they both broadly appear to maintain continuity with the Virgin series; Big Finish's early Bernice Summerfield works did not.

== Legacy ==
=== Adaptations ===
Paul Cornell's 1995 novel, Human Nature, as noted above, formed the basis of a two-part episode of the television series broadcast in 2007. This was the first time a full-length original Doctor Who novel had been adapted for television, although Cornell (who also wrote the teleplay) had to make substantial changes to transform his Seventh Doctor novel into a story featuring the Tenth Doctor.

Big Finish Productions produced audio drama adaptations of the novels Birthright and Just War, altering them to remove the Doctor and his various companions and focus on the character of Benny Summerfield. In October 2012 a special adaptation of Benny's debut story, Love and War was published with Sylvester McCoy as the Seventh Doctor and Sophie Aldred as Ace, to mark the 20th anniversary of the character's debut.

Due to the success of what was planned to be a one-off release, Big Finish continued the line with an adaptation of The Highest Science, again featuring Sylvester McCoy and Lisa Bowerman in their respective roles, in December 2014. Also produced were Russell T. Davies' novel Damaged Goods, starring Sylvester McCoy, Travis Oliver and Yasmin Bannerman as the Seventh Doctor, Chris Cwej and Roz Forrester respectively, released in May 2015; Theatre of War and All-Consuming Fire in December 2015; Nightshade in April 2016; and Original Sin and Cold Fusion in December 2016.

=== Reprints ===
The Bernice Summerfield novel Dead Romance was republished in 2004. In 2014, the novel Shakedown was republished by Penguin as part of The Monster Collection, followed in 2015 by Human Nature, republished as part of The History Collection. BBC Audio published audiobooks of Human Nature and Shakedown in 2015 and 2016, narrated by Lisa Bowerman and Dan Starkey respectively.

=== Cwej: The Series ===
Along with Bernice Summerfield, Chris Cwej would also receive a spin-off of his own published by Arcbeatle Press. The series would also cross over with Faction Paradox, a spin-off of the Eighth Doctor Adventures.

== List of Virgin New Adventures ==
=== Featuring the Doctor ===
#	Title	Author	Featuring	Published
1	Timewyrm: Genesys	John Peel	Ace	June 1991
2	Timewyrm: Exodus	Terrance Dicks	Ace, The War Chief, War Lords	August 1991
3	Timewyrm: Apocalypse	Nigel Robinson	Ace	October 1991
4	Timewyrm: Revelation	Paul Cornell	Ace	December 1991
5	Cat's Cradle: Time's Crucible	Marc Platt	Ace	February 1992
6	Cat's Cradle: Warhead	Andrew Cartmel	Ace	April 1992
7	Cat's Cradle: Witch Mark	Andrew Hunt	Ace	June 1992
8	Nightshade	Mark Gatiss	Ace	August 1992
9	Love and War	Paul Cornell	Ace, Bernice, Draconians	October 1992
10	Transit	Ben Aaronovitch	Bernice, Kadiatu Lethbridge-Stewart	December 1992
11	The Highest Science	Gareth Roberts	Bernice	February 1993
12	The Pit	Neil Penswick	Bernice	March 1993
13	Deceit	Peter Darvill-Evans	Ace, Bernice	April 1993
14	Lucifer Rising	Jim Mortimore & Andy Lane	Ace, Bernice	May 1993
15	White Darkness	David A. McIntee	Ace, Bernice	June 1993
16	Shadowmind	Christopher Bulis	Ace, Bernice	July 1993
17	Birthright	Nigel Robinson	Ace, Bernice	August 1993
18	Iceberg	David Banks	Ruby, Cybermen	September 1993
19	Blood Heat	Jim Mortimore	Ace, Bernice, Silurians, Brigadier Lethbridge-Stewart, Liz Shaw, John Benton, Jo Grant	October 1993
20	The Dimension Riders	Daniel Blythe	Ace, Bernice	November 1993
21	The Left-Handed Hummingbird	Kate Orman	Ace, Bernice	December 1993
22	Conundrum	Steve Lyons	Ace, Bernice	January 1994
23	No Future	Paul Cornell	Ace, Bernice, UNIT, The Meddling Monk, Vardans,	February 1994
24	Tragedy Day	Gareth Roberts	Ace, Bernice	March 1994
25	Legacy	Gary Russell	Ace, Bernice, Ice Warriors, Alpha Centurai, Peladonians	April 1994
26	Theatre of War	Justin Richards	Ace, Bernice, Braxiatel	May 1994
27	All-Consuming Fire	Andy Lane	Ace, Bernice, Sherlock Holmes, John Watson	June 1994
28	Blood Harvest	Terrance Dicks	Ace, Bernice, Romana, Great Vampires	July 1994
29	Strange England	Simon Messingham	Ace, Bernice	August 1994
30	First Frontier	David A. McIntee	Ace, Bernice, The Master	September 1994
31	St Anthony's Fire	Mark Gatiss	Ace, Bernice	October 1994
32	Falls the Shadow	Daniel O'Mahony	Ace, Bernice	November 1994
33	Parasite	Jim Mortimore	Ace, Bernice	December 1994
34	Warlock	Andrew Cartmel	Ace, Bernice	January 1995
35	Set Piece	Kate Orman	Ace, Bernice, Kadiatu	February 1995
36	Infinite Requiem	Daniel Blythe	Bernice	March 1995
37	Sanctuary	David A. McIntee	Bernice	April 1995
38	Human Nature	Paul Cornell	Bernice	May 1995
39	Original Sin	Andy Lane	Bernice, Chris, Roz, Tobias Vaughan	June 1995
40	Sky Pirates!	Dave Stone	Bernice, Chris, Roz	July 1995
41	Zamper	Gareth Roberts	Bernice, Chris, Roz	August 1995
42	Toy Soldiers	Paul Leonard	Bernice, Chris, Roz, Ogrons	September 1995
43	Head Games	Steve Lyons	Bernice, Chris, Roz, Ace, Mel, Glitz	October 1995
44	The Also People	Ben Aaronovitch	Bernice, Chris, Roz, Kadiatu	November 1995
45	Shakedown	Terrance Dicks	Bernice, Chris, Roz, Sontarans, Rutans, Ogrons	December 1995
46	Just War	Lance Parkin	Bernice, Chris, Roz, Mel	January 1996
47	Warchild	Andrew Cartmel	Bernice, Chris, Roz	February 1996
48	Sleepy	Kate Orman	Bernice, Chris, Roz	March 1996
49	Death and Diplomacy	Dave Stone	Bernice, Chris, Roz, Jason Kane	April 1996
50	Happy Endings	Paul Cornell	Bernice, Chris, Roz, Jason, Ace, Brigadier Lethbridge-Stewart, Romana II, Kadiatu, Braxiatel, Ruby	May 1996
51	GodEngine	Craig Hinton	Chris, Roz, Ice Warriors, Daleks	June 1996
52	Christmas on a Rational Planet	Lawrence Miles	Chris, Roz	July 1996
53	Return of the Living Dad (Note: This novel's working title was Big Trouble in Little Chalfont.)	Kate Orman	Chris, Roz, Bernice, Jason	August 1996
54	The Death of Art	Simon Bucher-Jones	Chris, Roz, Ace	September 1996
55	Damaged Goods	Russell T Davies	Chris, Roz	October 1996
56	So Vile a Sin	Ben Aaronovitch & Kate Orman	Chris, Roz, Bernice, Jason, Kadiatu	May 1997 (Note: Difficulties arose in the publication of this novel due to Aaronovitch suffering a major computer failure, leading to its being delayed and Kate Orman stepping in to help finish it. The book was eventually published after The Dying Days, but is listed here in the position it occupies in the series' ongoing narrative continuity.)
57	Bad Therapy	Matthew Jones	Chris, Peri	December 1996
58	Eternity Weeps	Jim Mortimore	Chris, Bernice, Jason, Liz Shaw	January 1997
59	The Room with No Doors	Kate Orman	Chris	February 1997
60	Lungbarrow	Marc Platt	Chris, Romana, Ace, Leela, K-9	March 1997
61	The Dying Days	Lance Parkin	Bernice, the Brigadier, Ice Warriors	April 1997

=== Featuring Bernice Summerfield ===
The adventures of Bernice Summerfield continued in a series of novels and short story anthologies published by Big Finish Productions from 2000.

== Plot overview ==
=== Recurring elements ===
The New Adventures significantly expanded the Doctor Who universe. The character of the Doctor was recast as Time's Champion, which was sometimes interpreted figuratively and sometimes literally – Time, Death and Pain are occasionally seen as personified beings (possibly Eternals), who were worshipped as gods in Ancient Gallifrey. The Doctor was also shown to have a link to the Other, a figure from the time of Rassilon and Omega; the nature of this link was most explicitly shown in Lungbarrow.

Many new parts of the TARDIS were seen in the New Adventures, including a tertiary console room made of stone. The Doctor was also seen to have a house in Kent which he used as a base of operations at different points in the 20th and 21st centuries; this "House on Allen Road" first appeared in Cat's Cradle: Warhead. Also appearing in Warhead and its sequels, Warlock and Warchild (all by Andrew Cartmel) are the ecological activist Justine and psychic Vincent Wheaton.

Alien races created for the New Adventures include the Chelonians (who first appear in The Highest Science) and the Pakhars (who first appear in Legacy). Another group of adversaries who appear in several New and Missing Adventures are the Great Old Ones, derived from H. P. Lovecraft's Cthulhu Mythos. In the New Adventures, these beings are survivors of the universe before this one, who therefore exist in accordance with a different set of physical laws. A being calling itself Azathoth in All-Consuming Fire turns out to be an impostor, but the novel identifies several other Doctor Who monsters with Lovecraftian entities: the Great Intelligence is Yog-Sothoth, the Animus is Lloigor, Fenric is Hastur the Unspeakable, and an Old One encountered in White Darkness is Cthulhu.

The early New Adventures were explicitly linked in story arcs, indicated in the books' titles. Later novels in the series were often, but not always, linked in looser story arcs, which were noted in publicity materials but not in the titles.

=== Timewyrm ===
During a visit to Ancient Mesopotamia, the Doctor accidentally grants a cybernetically enhanced alien queen the ability to travel freely in time, thus creating the Timewyrm. The Doctor and Ace pursue the Timewyrm through time and space, from a Nazi-occupied Britain to the far future. Eventually, after a battle within his own mind, the Doctor is able to trap the Timewyrm in the body of a mindless baby, forcing it to relinquish its power and memories but giving it a new chance at life.

=== Cat's Cradle ===
The TARDIS is damaged by a three-way collision with an alien parasite and time explorers from ancient Gallifrey. While the TARDIS attempts to repair itself, the Doctor and Ace fight the sinister Butler Corporation in the early 21st century. The final repairs to the TARDIS's link to the Eye of Harmony require organic material, which the Doctor eventually acquires after a visit to Wales and Tír na n-Óg, a planet inhabited by beings modelled after figures from Celtic mythology and English folklore. However, unbeknownst to the Doctor, the organic material is tainted with a demonic intelligence, which infects the TARDIS.

=== Future History Cycle ===
On the planet Heaven, Ace falls in love with a Traveller named Jan. However, when Heaven is threatened by the deadly fungal Hoothi, the Doctor manipulates Jan into sacrificing himself to destroy the Hoothi. Furious, Ace leaves the Doctor's company, and he is joined by archaeologist Bernice Summerfield. Benny and the Doctor travel through the history of Earth and its colonies from the 22nd through 26th centuries, having adventures alongside Kadiatu Lethbridge-Stewart and William Blake. Both the TARDIS and the Doctor begin behaving more and more erratic as a result of the TARDIS's infection. As part of his plan to remove the infection, the Doctor brings Ace back on board the TARDIS, but she has spent three years fighting Daleks in Earth's Spacefleet, and has been somewhat hardened by the experience. Ace rejoins the Doctor, and turns the tables on him by manipulating him into a mission on the planet Lucifer.

The Doctor continues to stage manage events like a chess master playing on multiple boards. At one point he even deposits Benny and Ace in 1909 and the distant future, respectively, to defeat an alien invasion on their own, while he uses the TARDIS's "Jade Pagoda" and defeats a Cyberman plot in 2006.

=== Alternate History Cycle ===
The TARDIS lands in a tar pit in an Earth ruled by the Silurians. This is an alternate universe in which the Third Doctor died in a Silurian prison and was not able to prevent the Silurian plague from devastating the human race. The Doctor recognizes that this universe is draining energy from the real one, and creates a Time Ram with his counterpart's TARDIS and his own, to destroy the altered reality; his own TARDIS is apparently destroyed, and he leaves in his counterpart's. The Doctor realises that someone has been altering the past, including the Doctor's own timeline. An alteration of the Doctor's encounter with the Matrix allows an ancient Gallifreyan evil to be resurrected; the psychic force of a dead Aztec priest-king survives for much longer than it should; and the Land of Fiction survives the Doctor's previous visit, with a new Writer (a young man named Jason) who traps the Doctor in a poorly constructed fictional world. Eventually the changes are revealed as the work of the Meddling Monk here named "Mortimus" and using a captured Chronovore to alter the timeline. He frees the Vardans from the time loop the Doctor had imprisoned them in, but the Doctor and UNIT are able to defeat an attempted Vardan invasion of Earth in 1976. Ace pretends to join the Monk and frees the Chronovore, who restores (most) of the altered realities to their status quo ante. Her encounter with the Monk also helps Ace to forgive the Doctor for his past manipulations.

After a visit to Peladon, Benny briefly leaves the Doctor and Ace to join an Ice Warrior archaeological team on Phaester Osiris. She rejoins them in time for the trio to become involved in a complex scheme by Irving Braxiatel to defeat a civilization of theatre-obsessed conquerors who had been threatening the Braxiatel Collection. In 1887, the trio join forces with Sherlock Holmes and Dr. Watson investigating several deaths by spontaneous human combustion traveling to Bombay and the planet Ry'leh to foil an alien impersonating the Great Old One Azathoth.

After spending several months running a speakeasy in 1920s Chicago, the Doctor returns to E-Space to face a renewed Vampire threat, and is reunited with Romana, who returns with him to Gallifrey. At an Air Force base in 1957 New Mexico, the Doctor, Benny and Ace encounter the Master, who has used nanotechnology provided by a race known as the Tzun to restore and regenerate his body. Later, the three travelers meet one of the oldest beings in the universe, a "grey man" who tries to weaken the good-and-evil dualism which his people had instilled in the universe's structure.

On Earth in the 21st century, the Doctor, Benny and Ace investigate a new drug called "warlock" which has the power to enable the user to transfer his or her mind to another place or body; they discover that drug is actually an alien gestalt intelligence, and help it to leave the Earth. A series of rifts in time and space (unknowingly created by a crude time machine used by Kadiatu Lethbridge-Stewart) sends Ace to Ancient Egypt, Benny to France in 1798, and the Doctor to the Paris Commune of 1871; the three are eventually reunited, but Ace decides to stay behind in Paris, keeping one of Kadiatu's time hoppers. She takes the title of Time's Vigilante.

After Ace's departure, Benny has a series of painful losses. First, her friend Darius Cheynor (a 24th century officer first encountered in The Dimension Riders) survives an encounter with powerful Sensopaths from the end of time, only to be killed in a conflict with the cybernetic Phractons. Shortly thereafter, Bernice falls in love with the 13th century Knight Templar Guy de Carnac, who apparently dies defending a Cathar village in the Albigensian Crusade. Unable to understand Benny's grief on a human level, the Doctor purchases a device which alters his biodata, transforming him into a human named Dr. John Smith. Smith lives as a history teacher at an English public school, and falls in love with a fellow teacher named Joan. However, when alien Aubertides, hoping to acquire Time Lord abilities, attack the school, Smith sacrifices himself and becomes the Doctor once more; as the Time Lord, he is unable to love Joan in the way the human John Smith did. Joan gives the Doctor her cat Wolsey.

Investigating a mysterious warning about Earth in the 30th century, the Doctor and Benny meet Adjudicators Roz Forrester and Chris Cwej. The four discover extensive corruption in the Earth Empire, and a trail which leads them to the Doctor's old enemy Tobias Vaughn, who had survived his betrayal by the Cybermen and worked for centuries behind the scenes to ensure that Earth was victorious over alien foes. Vaughn is a driving force behind the Earth Empire, but is defeated by the Doctor. Roz and Chris cannot return to the corrupt Adjudicator force, and join the Doctor and Benny in the TARDIS.

The four travellers have several adventures in quick succession, from a journey to the strange pocket dimension known as the System, to an encounter with Chelonians on a distant planet. They also stop the abduction of children from 1919 Earth to fight in an unending war on the planet Q'ell.

The Land of Fiction and its new Writer, Jason, trouble the Doctor again, this time creating a fictional "Dr. Who" whose two-dimensional morality contrasts with the complex manipulations of Time's Champion. In this adventure, the Doctor is temporarily reunited with both Ace and his former companion Mel, who is dismayed at the changes the Doctor has undergone since she knew him. The Land of Fiction's energy had escaped into the real world as a side effect of Kadiatu Lethbridge-Stewart's time travel, so the Doctor finds Kadiatu and takes her to the Dyson Sphere inhabited by the culture known as the People, who are so highly advanced that they have a non-aggression treaty with the Time Lords. While the Doctor, Roz and Chris investigate a possible murder, Benny helps Kadiatu overcome the programming which had turned her into a killing machine.

Following this, the crews of both the TARDIS and the solar yacht Tiger Moth become involved in the ongoing Sontaran/Rutan conflict. In 1941, Benny spends several months incognito in Nazi-occupied Guernsey, investigating a German weapon which has the potential to change the course of the Second World War – a weapon inspired by a passing remark made by the Doctor to a German scientist in 1936.

=== Psi-Powers Cycle ===
The TARDIS travellers next have several adventures involving humans with psychic abilities. Many of these involve a shadowy organization known as the Brotherhood. The first psi-powers encounter is a final encounter with Vincent Wheaton, who has lost his powers but is manipulating his psychic son Ricky. Next, the time travellers investigate an outbreak of psychic powers on the planet Yemaya 4 in the 23rd century, which turns out to be carrying the mind of a sentient computer. The travellers have several other adventures before their next encounter with the Brotherhood.

In the distant Dagellan Cluster, while the Doctor attempts to mediate an interplanetary war between three stellar empires, a war which Roz and Chris become caught up in, Benny meets and falls in love with a displaced human drifter and con-artist named Jason Kane. The two decide to get married. The Doctor arranges a gala wedding in the English village of Cheldon Boniface, in the early 21st century, home of Ishtar Hutchings, the former Timewyrm. He invites and provides transportation for guests from points throughout time and space, including Ace, Kadiatu, Irving Braxiatel and Sherlock Holmes and Watson. The wedding is interrupted by the Master, who had stolen a Gallifreyan relic to build himself a new body, and had created a Fortean flicker to distract the Time Lords with improbable coincidences; however, his plan had backfired when the flicker caused the Doctor to coincidentally arrive to arrange Benny's wedding. The Master's backup plans are defeated with the help of Ishtar; the temporal energy she releases also rejuvenates the aging Brigadier Lethbridge-Stewart. The Fortean flicker also returns the Doctor's original TARDIS from the alternate reality where it had been seemingly destroyed. The Doctor gives Benny and Jason two time rings as wedding presents.

On Mars shortly before the Dalek invasion of Earth, the Doctor, Roz and Chris discover a plan by a rogue Ice Warrior faction to assemble an ancient Osirian weapon to wreak revenge on the human colonists who have driven them off their planet. Returning to his investigations of human psi-powers, the Doctor travels to New York State in 1799, where he battles Cacophany, the Carnival Queen, representative of the irrationality banished from the universe by the earliest Time Lords.

Benny then contacts the Doctor, asking for his help in discovering what happened to her father Isaac Summerfield, a Spacefleet Admiral who disappeared during a crucial battle with the Daleks. The Doctor and Bernice discover that Isaac's ship was caught in a time rift and ended up on Earth in the twentieth century. They find Isaac in an English village in 1983, running an underground railroad for stranded aliens. While Chris and Roz become closer, the Doctor and Benny deal with a plot to change human history.

The Doctor recovers the trail of the mysterious Brotherhood in 1880s Paris, where several secret societies are using psychic powers to their own advantage. Investigating an unusually deadly shipment of cocaine in a London council estate in 1987, the Doctor, Roz and Chris discover that an ancient Gallifreyan weapon called an N-Form has been activated, in part by the distorted psychic bond between twins separated at birth. In the 2980s, while human nobles (including Roz's sister Leabie Forrester) fight for control of the Earth Empire, the Brotherhood (which has become a powerful player in galactic politics) hopes to use another Gallifreyan artefact, the Nexus, to induce psychic powers in all human beings. While the Doctor and Chris focus on the threat posed by the Brotherhood, Roz joins her sister in her bid to reform the corrupt Empire. Although the Doctor is able to defeat the Brotherhood utterly, he is unable to save Roz from dying in battle. Leabie becomes Empress, and at Roz's funeral the Doctor suffers a heart attack.

While recovering from Roz's death in 1958 London, the Doctor and Chris encounter Moriah, an alien king who has been creating artificial life-forms in an effort to bring back his dead wife, and the Doctor's former companion Peri, who has been trapped in a loveless marriage to King Yrcanos since she and the Doctor parted. In 2003, when Benny and Jason join two archaeological teams searching for Noah's Ark, a ruthless Iranian soldier accidentally causes a deadly biological agent to be released in the Earth's atmosphere, killing hundreds of millions, including Liz Shaw. Benny and Jason agree to divorce.

In 16th-century Japan, the Doctor meets Victorian time-traveller Penelope Gate (whom later BBC novels suggest may be his mother) and comes to terms with his recent losses and impending regeneration (of which he is aware). Chris also begins to heal and discover his own form of heroism. Finally, the Doctor returns to his family home on Gallifrey, where long-buried secrets are revealed. Chris decides to remain on Gallifrey and Romana, now Lady President, sends the Doctor to Skaro to retrieve the Master's remains. This leads into the events of the television movie.

The Eighth Doctor meets Benny at the house on Allen Road in 1997, and the two of them (alongside the Brigadier) defeat an Ice Warrior invasion. At the story's end, the Doctor takes Benny to her new job in the 26th century, a position at St. Oscar's University on the planet Dellah.
