= Jim Mortimore =

British science fiction writer

Jim Mortimore is a British science fiction writer, who has written several spin-off novels for popular television series, principally Doctor Who, but also Farscape and Babylon 5.

When BBC Books cancelled his Doctor Who novel Campaign, he had it published independently and gave the proceeds to a charity – the Bristol Area Down's Syndrome Association. He is also the writer of the Big Finish Doctor Who audio play The Natural History of Fear and their Tomorrow People audio play Plague of Dreams. He has done music for other Big Finish productions as well as playing keyboards in the Bristol-based band SLS.

He released his first original novel in 2011, Skaldenland.

== Doctor Who novels ==
- Lucifer Rising (1993) (with Andy Lane)
- Blood Heat (1993)
- Parasite (1994)
- Eternity Weeps (1997)
- The Sword of Forever (1998) (a Bernice Summerfield novel)
- Eye of Heaven (1998)
- Beltempest (1998)
- Campaign (2000) (published unofficially)

== Cracker novels ==
- The Mad Woman in the Attic (1994)
- Men Should Weep (1995)
- Brotherly Love (1996)

== Other novels ==
- Space Truckers (1996)
- Babylon 5: Clark's Law (1996, ISBN 0-440-22229-X)
- Farscape: Dark Side of the Sun (2000) – under pseudonym of Andrew Dymond
- Skaldenland (2011, Obverse Books)
