= So Vile a Sin =

1997 novel by Ben Aaronovitch and Kate Orman

- Author: Ben Aaronovitch & Kate Orman
- Cover artist: Jon Sullivan
- Series: Doctor Who book: Virgin New Adventures
- Release number: 56
- Subject: Featuring: Seventh Doctor; Chris, Roz, Bernice, Jason, Kadiatu Lethbridge-Stewart
- Set in: Period between Damaged Goods and Bad Therapy
- Publisher: Virgin Books
- Publication date: May 1997
- ISBN: 0-426-20484-0
- Preceded by: The Dying Days (publication)
- Followed by: N/A

So Vile a Sin is an original novel written by Ben Aaronovitch and Kate Orman and based on the long-running British science fiction television series Doctor Who. It features the Seventh Doctor, Chris and Roz, Bernice, Jason, and Kadiatu Lethbridge-Stewart. It is the conclusion of the "Psi Powers series" and the last appearance of Roz Forrester.

== Background ==
The novel was originally announced as being written only by Aaronovitch, but due to a hard drive crash on his computer it was delayed and taken on by Orman to complete. Originally to have been published in November 1996, it did not eventually appear until May 1997. This made it the last of the published New Adventures novels featuring the Doctor. However, in terms of the ongoing narrative of the series it was followed by the five books published immediately previously to it, hence being numbered 56 of 61.

The title is taken from William Shakespeare's Henry V, Act 2, scene iv. It is Dauphin's line "Self-love, my liege, is not so vile a sin/As self-neglecting."
