= David A. McIntee =

British writer (1968–2024)

- Born: 31 December 1968
- Died: 15 December 2024 (aged 55)
- Spouse: Lesley McIntee
- Writing career
- Period: 1993–2014
- Genre: Science fiction
- Notable works: Doctor Who, Beautiful Monsters
- Website: www.btinternet.com/~david.mcintee/

David A. McIntee (31 December 1968 – 15 December 2024) was a British writer. He was known for writing various sci-fi novels, mostly Doctor Who.

== Life and career ==
McIntee wrote many spin-off novels based on the BBC science fiction television series Doctor Who, as well as one each based on Final Destination and Space: 1999. He also wrote a non-fiction books on Star Trek: Voyager, Sapphire and Steel, and one jointly on the Alien and Predator film franchises. He wrote several audio plays, and contributed to various magazines including Dreamwatch, SFX, Star Trek Communicator, Titan's Star Trek Magazine, Death Ray, and The Official Star Wars Fact Files. He later wrote for the UK's Asian-entertainment magazine, Neo.

Between 2006 and 2008, McIntee co-edited an anthology, Shelf Life, in memory of fellow Doctor Who novelist Craig Hinton, which was published in December 2008 to raise money for the British Heart Foundation.

McIntee made the jump to Star Trek fiction in October 2007, with "On The Spot", a story in the Star Trek: The Next Generation anthology The Sky's The Limit. This was followed with a novella in the anthology Seven Deadly Sins in March 2010.

In January 2008, Blue Water Productions began publishing The Kingdom of Hades, a comic book sequel to Ray Harryhausen's 1963 movie Jason and the Argonauts. This is a five-issue series, though some early publicity erroneously quoted it as being four issues long. He followed this title with a four-issue mini-series, William Shatner Presents: Quest For Tomorrow.

In 2009, Abaddon Books published McIntee's The Light of Heaven, an entry in the publisher's Twilight of Kerberos series.

In 2010, Powys Media published McIntee's novel Space: 1999 Born for Adversity.

In 2018, Obverse Books published McIntee's first non-fiction for some years, an analysis of two stories from the Sapphire and Steel television series in collaboration with his wife, Lesley, as part of their Silver Archive series of monographs.

McIntee died on 15 December 2024, 16 days shy of his 56th birthday.

== Doctor Who: Avatar ==
In mid 1989, McIntee wrote a three-part serial entitled Doctor Who: Avatar, which featured the Doctor and Ace encountering a zombie invasion during a Lovecraftian horror experimentation in 1927.

The story was submitted to the production team for a possible inclusion in the show's 27th season. However, it was announced in September 1989 that the BBC would cancel the show at the conclusion of its 26th season.

In June 1993, McIntee adapted the story as the novel Doctor Who: White Darkness, which was subsequently published by Virgin Publishing.

== Bibliography ==
=== Doctor Who ===
==== Virgin New Adventures ====
- White Darkness (1993)
- First Frontier (1994)
- Sanctuary (1995)

==== Virgin Missing Adventures ====
- Lords of the Storm (1995)
- The Shadow of Weng-Chiang (1996)
- The Dark Path (1997)

==== Past Doctor Adventures ====
- The Face of the Enemy (1998)
- Mission: Impractical (1998)
- The Wages of Sin (1999)
- Bullet Time (2001)
- The Eleventh Tiger (2004)

==== Eighth Doctor Adventures ====
- Autumn Mist (1999)

=== Star Trek ===
- The Sky's The Limit story: "On The Spot". (Pocket Books, 2007)
- Seven Deadly Sins novella: Reservoir Ferengi. (Pocket Books, 2010)
- Indistinguishable From Magic. (Pocket Books, 2011)

=== Final Destination ===
- Destination Zero (2005)

=== Space: 1999 ===
- Born For Adversity (2010)

=== Other novels ===
- Twilight of Kerberos: The Light of Heaven. (Abaddon Books, 2009, ISBN 1-905437-87-0)

=== Non-fiction ===
- Delta Quadrant: The Unofficial Guide to Voyager (Virgin Books, 2000)
- Beautiful Monsters: The Unofficial and Unauthorised Guide to the Alien and Predator Films (Telos, 272 pages, 2005, ISBN 1-903889-94-4)
- The Silver Archive #1:Sapphire and Steel Assignments 1 & 2 (Obverse Books, 2018)
- Wizards: From Merlin to Faust coauthored with Lesley McIntee (Osprey Publishing, 83 pages, 2014)

=== Comics ===
- Ray Harryhausen Presents: Jason and the Argonauts – The Kingdom of Hades (with Randy Kintz, 5-issue limited series, Bluewater Productions, November 2007–)
- William Shatner Presents: Quest For Tomorrow (4-issue miniseries, Bluewater Productions, 2010)

=== Audios ===
==== Big Finish audio plays ====
- Excelis Rising (2002)
- Unregenerate! (2005)

==== Other audio plays ====
- The Quality of Mercy (BBV, 2003)
