= Marc Platt (writer) =

British novelist and playwright (born 1953)

Marc Platt (born 13 May 1953) is a British novelist and playwright. He is best known for his work with the BBC science fiction television series Doctor Who.

== Career ==
After studying catering at a technical college, Platt worked first for Trust House Forte, and then in administration for the BBC. After multiple attempts to work on the series, he wrote the 1989 Doctor Who serial Ghost Light based on two proposals, one of which later became the novel Lungbarrow. That novel was greatly anticipated by fans as it was the culmination of the so-called "Cartmel Masterplan", revealing details of the Doctor's background and family.

After the original series' cancellation, Platt wrote multiple tie-in novels for Virgin Publishing, and later would become a regular writer for Big Finish Productions. Among his most famous productions was the audio Doctor Who drama Spare Parts, which told the origin of the Cybermen. The story was later the inspiration for the 2006 Doctor Who television story "Rise of the Cybermen"/"The Age of Steel", written by Tom MacRae, for which Platt received a thanks in the end credits and a fee.

== Credits ==
=== Television ===
- Ghost Light

=== Big Finish ===
==== Doctor Who ====
- Loups-Garoux
- Spare Parts
- Valhalla
- The Skull of Sobek
- Time Reef
- Paper Cuts
- An Earthly Child
- The Cradle of the Snake
- Relative Dimensions
- The Silver Turk
- The Butcher of Brisbane
- Night of the Stormcrow
- Eldrad Must Die!
- The Doctor's Tale
- Planet of the Rani
- Doctor Who: Doom Coalition: The Galileo Trap
- Doctor Who: Doom Coalition: The Gift
- The Behemoth

==== Doctor Who: The Fourth Doctor Adventures ====
- The Skin of the Sleek
- The Thief Who Stole Time

==== Philip Hinchcliffe Presents ====
- The Ghosts of Gralstead (with Philip Hinchcliffe)
- The Devil's Armada (with Philip Hinchcliffe)
- The Genesis Chamber (with Philip Hinchcliffe)

==== Doctor Who: The Lost Stories ====
- Doctor Who: The Lost Stories: Point of Entry (with Barbara Clegg)
- Doctor Who: The Lost Stories: Thin Ice
- Doctor Who: The Lost Stories: The Children of Seth (with Christopher Bailey)

==== Companion Chronicles ====
- Doctor Who – The Companion Chronicles: Frostfire
- Doctor Who – The Companion Chronicles: Mother Russia
- Doctor Who – The Companion Chronicles: The Doll of Death
- Doctor Who – The Companion Chronicles: The Three Companions
- Doctor Who – The Companion Chronicles: Quinnis
- Doctor Who – The Companion Chronicles: The Flames of Cadiz
- Doctor Who – The Companion Chronicles: The Beginning

==== Doctor Who Unbound ====
- Auld Mortality
- A Storm of Angels

==== Jago & Litefoot ====
- Jago and Litefoot: The Case of the Gluttonous Guru

==== Blake's 7 ====
- Blake's 7: Traitor
- Blake's 7: The Early Years: Flag & Flame
- Blake's 7: The Liberator Chronicles: The Sea of Iron
- Blake's 7: The Classic Audio Adventures: Drones

==== Dan Dare ====
- Dan Dare: Marooned on Mercury

==== Timeslip ====
- The War That Never Was

==== Big Finish Classics ====
- The Wonderful Wizard of Oz
- The Time Machine

== Noise Monster audio play ==
- Space 1889: The Siege of Alclyon

== Novels ==
- Doctor Who: Ghost Light novelisation
- Doctor Who: Battlefield novelisation
- Doctor Who: Cat's Cradle: Time's Crucible
- Doctor Who: Downtime novelisation
- Doctor Who: Lungbarrow

== Comics ==
- Doctor Who (in Doctor Who Magazine No. 192, 1992)
