= Virgin Missing Adventures =

Series of Doctor Who-based novels (1994–1997)

The Virgin Missing Adventures were a series of novels from Virgin Publishing based on the British science-fiction television series Doctor Who, which had been cancelled in 1989, featuring stories set between televised episodes of the programme. The novels were published from 1994 to 1997, and featured the First through Sixth Doctors. (The Seventh Doctor also appeared in one novel.) The Missing Adventures complemented the Virgin New Adventures range, which had proved successful.

== Publication history ==
Virgin had purchased the successful children's imprint Target Books in 1989, with Virgin's new fiction editor Peter Darvill-Evans taking over the range. Target's major output was novelisations of televised Doctor Who stories, and Darvill-Evans realised that there were few stories left to be novelised. He approached the BBC for permission to commission original stories written directly for print, but such a licence was initially refused. However, after the television series was cancelled at the end of 1989, Virgin were granted the licence to produce full-length original novels continuing the story from the point at which the series had concluded.

The first range covered only the continuing adventures of the Seventh Doctor, but when that proved successful, Virgin also created this range covering the previous Doctors, with new stories that fit in between the televised serials.

In addition to original novels, the Missing Adventures series also incorporated two novelisations: The Ghosts of N-Space, based upon a mid-1990s BBC audio play, and Downtime, which was based upon an independent video production featuring several characters from the Doctor Who series (the novelisation is one of the few Doctor Who novels in which the Doctor does not appear as a central character).

When the BBC decided in 1996 to do their own line of novels with the Eighth Doctor, they withdrew the license from Virgin to publish the Eighth Doctor Adventures. The adventures of the previous Doctors were taken up by the BBC in the Past Doctor Adventures line of books.

== Reprints ==
In 2014, both The Scales of Injustice and The Sands of Time were reprinted as part of BBC Books' The Monster Collection. These were followed with The English Way of Death, a part of The History Collection (2015).

== List ==
Including books featuring two of the Doctors, the total tallies are: First Doctor, 5 books; Second, 4 books; Third, 6 books; Fourth, 8 books; Fifth, 5 books; Sixth, 5 books; and Seventh, 1 book.

#	Title	Author	Doctor	Featuring	Published
1	Goth Opera	Paul Cornell	Fifth	Tegan, Nyssa, Romana	July 1994
2	Evolution	John Peel	Fourth	Sarah Jane	September 1994
3	Venusian Lullaby	Paul Leonard	First	Ian, Barbara	October 1994
4	The Crystal Bucephalus	Craig Hinton	Fifth	Tegan, Turlough, Kamelion, Dorothy	November 1994
5	State of Change	Christopher Bulis	Sixth	Peri	December 1994
6	The Romance of Crime	Gareth Roberts	Fourth	Romana II, K-9	January 1995
7	The Ghosts of N-Space	Barry Letts	Third	Sarah Jane, the Brigadier	February 1995
8	Time of Your Life	Steve Lyons	Sixth	Grant Markham	March 1995
9	Dancing the Code	Paul Leonard	Third	Jo, UNIT	April 1995
10	The Menagerie	Martin Day	Second	Jamie, Zoe	May 1995
11	System Shock	Justin Richards	Fourth	Sarah, Harry	June 1995
12	The Sorcerer's Apprentice	Christopher Bulis	First	Ian, Barbara, Susan	July 1995
13	Invasion of the Cat-People	Gary Russell	Second	Ben, Polly	August 1995
14	Managra	Stephen Marley	Fourth	Sarah Jane	September 1995
15	Millennial Rites	Craig Hinton	Sixth	Mel	October 1995
16	The Empire of Glass	Andy Lane	First	Steven, Vicki; plus Irving Braxiatel	November 1995
17	Lords of the Storm	David A. McIntee	Fifth	Turlough	December 1995
18	Downtime	Marc Platt	none	The Brigadier, Sarah Jane, Victoria	January 1996
19	The Man in the Velvet Mask	Daniel O'Mahony	First	Dodo	February 1996
20	The English Way of Death	Gareth Roberts	Fourth	Romana II, K-9	March 1996
21	The Eye of the Giant	Christopher Bulis	Third	Liz Shaw, UNIT	April 1996
22	The Sands of Time	Justin Richards	Fifth	Tegan, Nyssa	May 1996
23	Killing Ground	Steve Lyons	Sixth	Grant Markham	June 1996
24	The Scales of Injustice	Gary Russell	Third	Liz Shaw, UNIT	July 1996
25	The Shadow of Weng-Chiang	David A. McIntee	Fourth	Romana I, K-9	August 1996
26	Twilight of the Gods	Christopher Bulis	Second	Jamie, Victoria	September 1996
27	Speed of Flight	Paul Leonard	Third	Jo, Mike Yates	October 1996
28	The Plotters	Gareth Roberts	First	Ian, Barbara, Vicki	November 1996
29	Cold Fusion	Lance Parkin	Fifth and Seventh	Adric, Nyssa, Tegan; Roz, Chris	December 1996
30	Burning Heart	Dave Stone	Sixth	Peri	January 1997
31	A Device of Death	Christopher Bulis	Fourth	Sarah Jane, Harry	February 1997
32	The Dark Path	David A. McIntee	Second	Jamie, Victoria	March 1997
33	The Well-Mannered War	Gareth Roberts	Fourth	Romana II, K-9	April 1997

== Continuity ==
Three of the Missing Adventures were sequels to televised serials, they were:

- The Sands of Time — Pyramids of Mars
- The Shadow of Weng-Chiang — The Talons of Weng-Chiang
- Twilight of the Gods — The Web Planet

Two of the Missing Adventures were novelisations:

- The Ghosts of N-Space — the BBC Radio audio drama The Ghosts of N-Space
- Downtime — the Reeltime Pictures direct-to-video spin-off Downtime, featuring the Great Intelligence and forming a sequel to The Abominable Snowmen (1967) and The Web of Fear (1968).

Many Missing Adventures featured old foes, including:

- Killing Ground — The Cybermen
- The Dark Path — The Master
- The Scales of Injustice — The Silurians
- Lords of the Storm — The Sontarans
- State of Change — The Rani
- Millennial Rites — The Valeyard
- The Well-Mannered War — The Black Guardian
- The Romance of Crime — The Ogrons

Speed of Flight is the only novel in the series that is a prequel; to Timelash.

== Burning Heart ==
Burning Heart was originally planned to feature Judge Dredd and was going to be set in Mega-City One. Virgin Books held the rights to the Judge Dredd novels at the time, and author Dave Stone had already written Judge Dredd novels for Virgin. This plan was scrapped after the release of the 1995 film based on that character. The book was re-written, and the character of Dredd was replaced by one Adjudicator Joseph Craator.

== Who Killed Kennedy ==
In 1996, Virgin Books published Who Killed Kennedy, a Doctor Who novel by David Bishop. Although set during the time of the Third Doctor, Virgin published this book as a standalone work and not as part of the Missing Adventures series.
