= Script editor =

Member of production teams of scripted programmes

An example of a script.

A script editor is a member of the production team of scripted television and radio programs, usually dramas and comedies. The script editor has many responsibilities including finding new script writers, developing storyline and series ideas with writers, and ensuring that scripts are suitable for production. The script editor will work closely with the writer at each draft of the script, giving the writer feedback on the quality of the work, suggesting improvements that can be made whilst also ensuring that practical issues like show continuity and correct running time are adhered to. Unlike the writers, script editors will usually be full-time members of the production team, working closely with the producer, if the script writer is not a producer.

== See also ==
- Script doctor
- Story editor
- Showrunner
