= Peter Elson =

English science fiction illustrator

Peter Elson (13 January 1947 – March 1998) was an English science fiction illustrator whose work appeared on the covers of numerous science fiction paperback novels, as well as in the Terran Trade Authority series of illustrated books.

== Biography ==
Elson, whose illustrations often placed detailed, brightly liveried spacecraft against vividly coloured backgrounds, influenced an entire generation of science fiction illustrators and concept artists.

The look of the PC game Homeworld was heavily influenced by Elson's illustrations of the '70s and '80s, according to artists who worked on the title (he is listed in the Special Thanks section of the game's manual and has a character, Captain Elson, named after him). Elson was originally slated to create the game's box art, but at the last moment was pre-empted by the publisher's decision to use a 3D rendered scene.

Born in Ealing, west London, he died of a heart attack in Skegness while working on mural paintings for Butlins. Most of his original work is now owned by his sister.
