= Virgin Books =

British book publisher

- Status: Active
- Founded: 1979
- Founder: Richard Branson
- Country of origin: United Kingdom
- Headquarters location: London
- Distribution: The Book Service
- Publication types: Books
- Owners: Random House (90%); Virgin Group (10%)
- Official website: penguin.co.uk/company/publishers/ebury/virgin-books.html

Virgin Books is a British book publisher 90% owned by the publishing group Random House, and 10% owned by Virgin Group.

== History ==
Virgin established its book publishing arm in the late 1970s; in the latter part of the 1980s Virgin purchased several existing companies, including WH Allen, well known among Doctor Who fans for their Target Books imprint; Virgin Books was incorporated into WH Allen in 1989, but in 1991 WH Allen was renamed Virgin Publishing Ltd.

Virgin Publishing's early success came with the Doctor Who New Adventures novels, officially licensed full-length novels carrying on the story of the popular science-fiction television series following its cancellation in 1989. Virgin published this series from 1991 to 1997, as well as a range of Doctor Who reference books from 1992 to 1998 under the Doctor Who Books imprint.

In recent times the company is best known for its commercial non-fiction list, which includes business, health and lifestyle, music, film, and celebrity biographies. Richard Branson's autobiography Losing My Virginity, released in 1998, was an international best-seller at the time, and continues to sell well. His follow-up title Business Stripped Bare was published in September 2008. Virgin Business Guides included titles by Robert Craven, Paul Barrow and Rachelle Thackray. More recently the company has enjoyed success with Robert H Frank's The Economic Naturalist, where the author had his economics students pose interesting questions from everyday life and explain them through economics.

Random House, through its United Kingdom division, acquired a 90% stake in the company in March 2007. In November 2009, Virgin became an independent imprint within Ebury Publishing, a division of the Random House Group.

== Imprints ==
Other popular ranges have included various erotic fiction lines:

- Black Lace specializes in erotica and erotic romance written by female authors specifically for heterosexual female readers. The imprint does not publish novels written by men partly as a marketing scheme, partly to better appeal to their target demographic. The books explore women's sexuality as well as such themes as BDSM, group sex and bisexuality. The imprint began publishing in 1993, has published over 250 titles and sold over three million books. In 2006, Black Lace developed three specific lines within the imprint: contemporary, historical and paranormal. Black Lace also publishes short story anthologies, novella collections and in 2007 launched its first trilogy, a series of werewolf erotica by Mathilde Madden. The imprint marked its fifteen-year anniversary in 2008 with re-issues of several of its original novels. In 2009, Virgin announced that Black Lace would add no new titles in 2010. The line was relaunched in 2012.
- Nexus Books, sado-masochistic pornography written mostly for men who have sex with women, and women who have sex with men or women. In 2009, Virgin announced that Nexus would add no new titles in 2010.
- Idol for gay men (defunct).
- Sapphire for lesbians (defunct).
