= The Spice of Life, London =

Pub in Soho, London

The Spice of Life
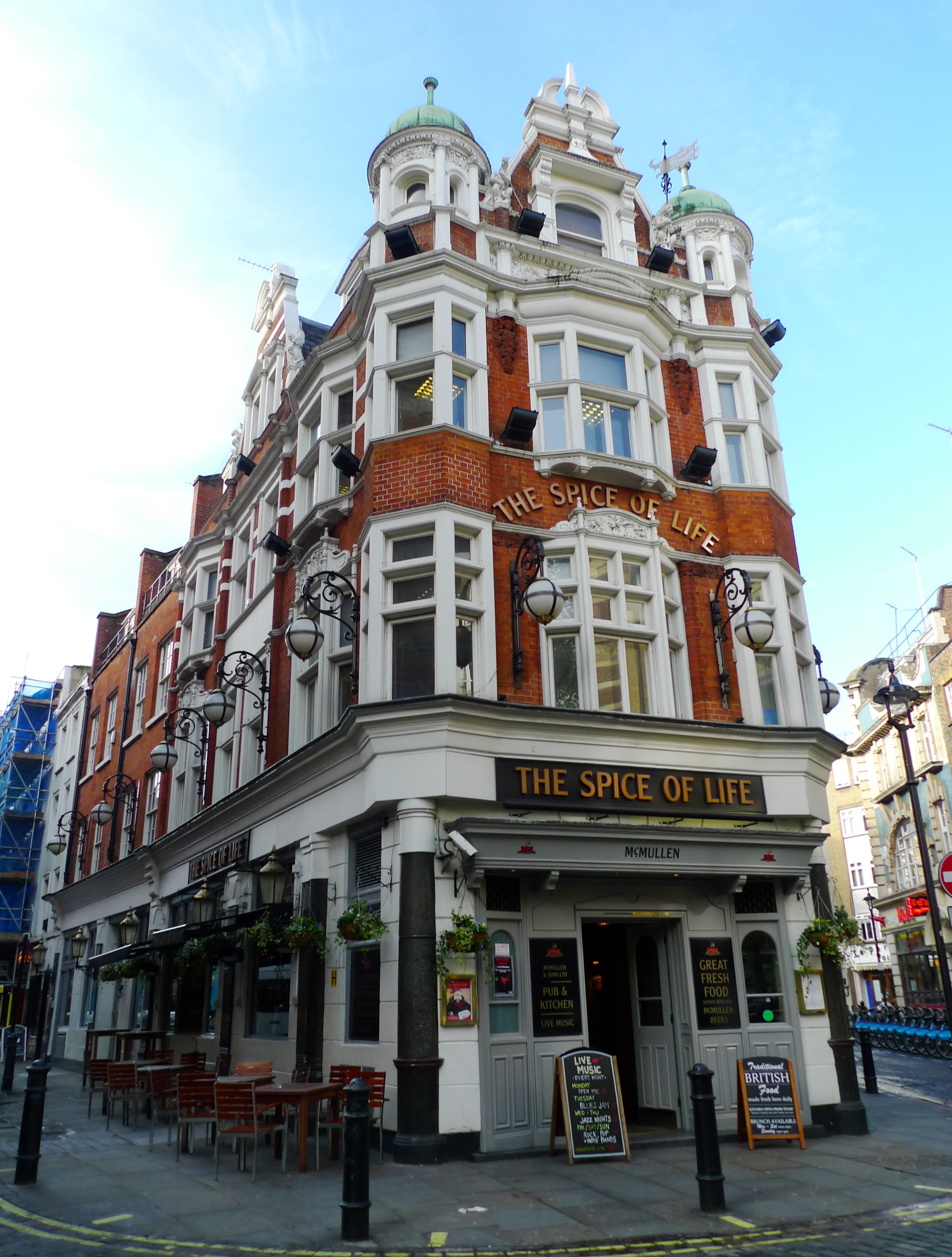
- The Spice of Life in 2012

General information
- Coordinates: 51.513424°N 0.129702°W 

The Spice of Life is a pub at Cambridge Circus in London's Charing Cross Road. The pub was founded as The George & Thirteen Cantons in or before 1759, and later became The Scots Hoose. By 1975 it had been renamed The Spice of Life.

As the Scots Hoose in the 1950s and 1960s, the pub had one of Britain's most celebrated folk clubs in its upstairs room, run by Bruce Dunnet, that featured some of the greatest names of the folk revival, such as Bert Jansch, Al Stewart, Davey Graham, Ralph McTell, Roy Harper, Sandy Denny, Ewan MacColl and The Young Tradition. The club operated under various names, including "The Young Tradition".

In the 1970s and beyond the pub was regularly frequented by members of many rock groups including; The Stranglers, Buzzcocks, Stiff Little Fingers, Sex Pistols, Spandau Ballet, The Faces, UFO even the comedy group The Rutles. Film Directors including Jim Parsons, James Russell, Alan G Parker and Don Letts have also been regular visitors since the mid-nineties.

Members of the Monty Python team have also been among the pubs regulars over the years.

The pub features as a location in Ben Aaronovitch’s novel Moon Over Soho, part of the “Rivers of London” series.
