= Vagina dentata =

Folk story and cautionary tale

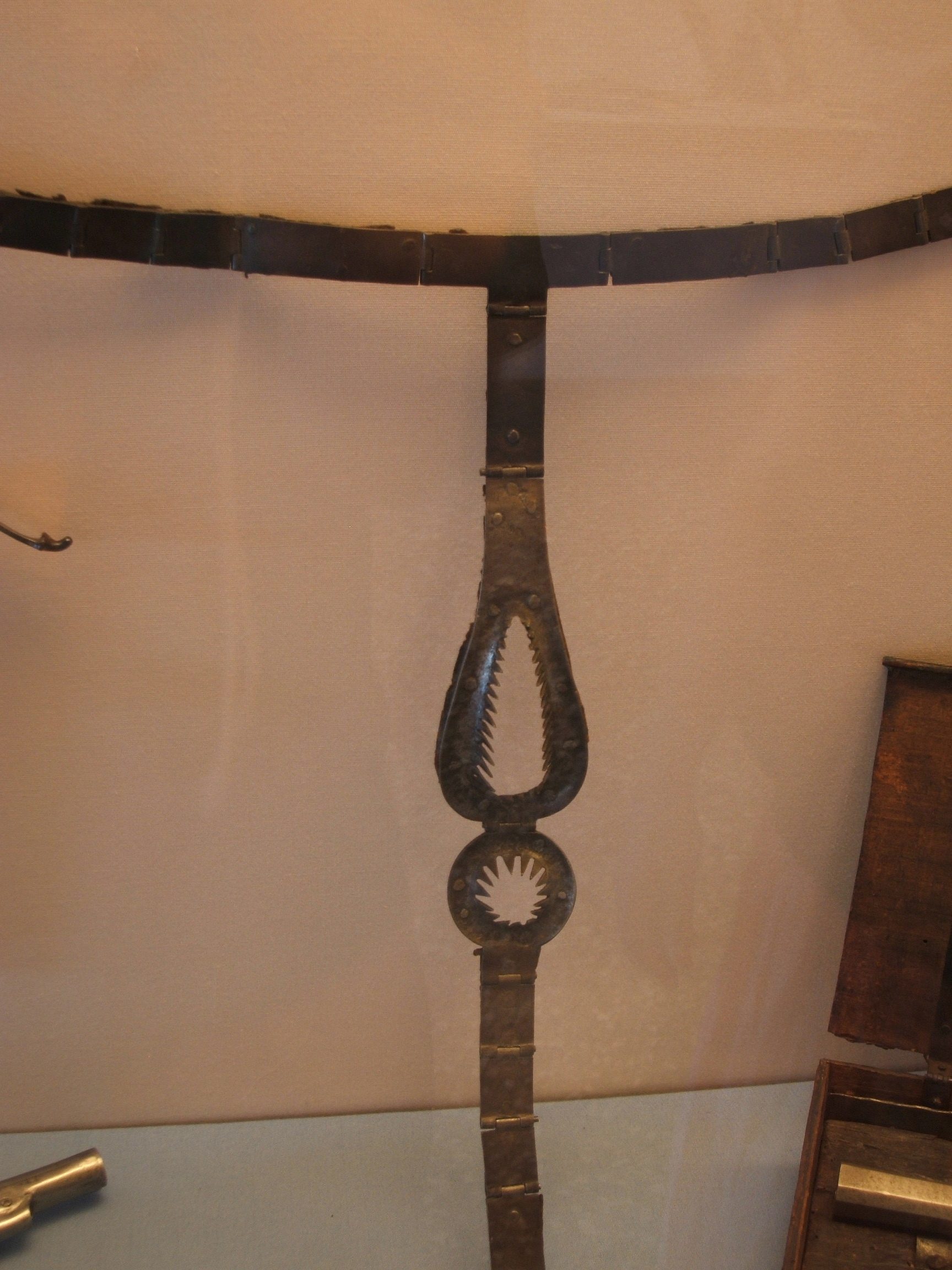
A spiked Venetian chastity belt

Vagina dentata (Latin for 'toothed vagina') is a folk tale tradition in which a vagina is said to contain teeth, with the associated implication that sexual intercourse might result in injury, emasculation, or castration. The topic of vagina dentata may also cover a rare medical condition affecting the vagina, in which case it is more accurately termed a vaginal dermoid cyst.

== In folklore ==
Vagina dentata folktales have occurred in most cultures and throughout history. Such folk stories are frequently told as cautionary tales warning of the dangers of unknown women and to discourage rape.

The psychologist Erich Neumann wrote that in one such myth "a fish inhabits the vagina of the Terrible Mother; the hero is the man who overcomes the Terrible Mother, breaks the teeth out of her vagina, and so makes her into a woman."

=== North America ===
The Ponca and the Otoe tribes tell a story in which Coyote outwits a wicked old woman who placed teeth in the vaginas of her daughter and another young woman she kept prisoner, in order to seduce, kill, and rob young men. Coyote kills the woman and her daughter but marries the other young woman, after knocking out the teeth in her vagina "except for one blunt tooth that was very thrilling when making love".

=== South America ===
The legend also appears in the mythology of the Chaco and Guiana tribes of South America. In some versions, the hero leaves one tooth.

=== Hinduism ===
In Hinduism, the asura Andhaka, son of Shiva and Parvati (but not aware of it), is killed by Shiva when he tries to force the disguised Shiva into surrendering Parvati. Andhaka's son Adi, also an asura, takes the form of Parvati to seduce and kill Shiva with a toothed vagina in order to avenge Andhaka, but is also slain.

=== Ainu legends ===
The Ainu legend is that a sharp-toothed demon hid inside the vagina of a young woman and emasculated two young men on their wedding nights. Consequently, the woman sought help from a blacksmith who fashioned an iron phallus to break the demon's teeth.

=== Māori mythology ===
In Māori mythology, the trickster Māui tries to grant mankind immortality by reversing the birth process, turning into a worm and crawling into the vagina of Hine-nui-te-pō, the goddess of night and of death, and out through her mouth while she sleeps. His trick is ruined when a pīwakawaka laughs at the sight of his entry, awakening Hine-nui-te-pō, who bites the worm to death with her obsidian vaginal teeth.

=== Western Asia ===
Arabs from South-Eastern Iran and islands in Strait of Hormuz have a legend about Menmendas, a creature that looks like a beautiful young woman with spikes on her thighs. She walks in the coastal mountains with a small box of jewels and attracts every man on her way. Menmendas goes with an attracted man into an empty house, puts the box of jewels under her head and lies down with her legs spread. If the man understands who this woman is, he can cast a fistful of sand into her eyes and run away with the box. If the man is overcome by lust, the woman cuts him in half with her legs.

== Psychology ==
Vagina dentata has been viewed by many feminist scholars through psychoanalytic theory, particularly Freudian castration anxiety and birth trauma. The lesbian vampire trope is one of the many examples of vagina dentata imagery in horror films, which are often critiqued in feminist film theory.

In her book Sexual Personae (1991), Camille Paglia wrote: "The toothed vagina is no sexist hallucination: every penis is made less in every vagina, just as mankind, male and female, is devoured by mother nature."

In his book The Wimp Factor, Stephen J. Ducat expresses a similar view, that these myths express the threat sexual intercourse poses for men who, although entering triumphantly, always leave diminished.

== In popular culture ==
- In the novel Snow Crash by Neal Stephenson, the vagina of Y.T., a female character, is equipped with a dentata, a device which injects a powerful soporific into whatever penetrates it, in order to prevent rape.
- The folk tale is the basis for the 2007 American comedy horror film Teeth, written and directed by Mitchell Lichtenstein. In the film, Jess Weixler plays Dawn O'Keefe, a teenage spokesperson for a Christian abstinence group, who has vagina dentata and employs it to fight back against rape and sexual abuse.
- The 2024 Off-Broadway musical Teeth was based on the 2007 comedy horror film, with book and music by Anna K. Jacobs and book and lyrics by Michael R. Jackson (the latter of whom wrote the Tony Award–winning musical A Strange Loop). The show features a musical sequence in which the cast's female ensemble transforms into disciples of "Dentata" (a mythological goddess) and castrates the male cast members with their vaginas.
- In the novels Rivers of London and Moon Over Soho, the Pale Lady is a fae and chimera who possesses vagina dentata, which she uses to kill men with whom she is having intercourse.
- In the short story "The Weasel Bride" by Tanith Lee, the titular bride possesses vagina dentata, which leads to her death. The short story first appears in The Book of the Dead (1991) part of Lee's The Secret Books Of Paradys series.
- The comedic and feminist novel Vagina dentata (2019) by Luci van Org features toothed vaginas alongside Germanic mythology.
- In the film Prometheus, a mutated squid-like foetus which has grown to an enormous size opens its vagina dentata to reveal an ovipositor which lays an egg inside an alien.
- In the 1993 film Schramm, the titular murderer on his back in bed sees inexplicable motion under the sheets at his groin, throwing back the covers to recoil in fear from an organ-like meaty glob snapping its numerous vaginæ dentata at his genitals

== Medical ==
In rare instances, dermoid cysts (a type of tumor) may grow in the vagina. Dermoid cysts are formed from the outer layers of embryonic skin cells. These cells are able to mature into many different types of tissues, and these cysts are able to form anywhere the skin is or where the skin folds inward to become another organ, such as in the ear or the vagina. However, when dermoid cysts occur in the vagina, they are covered by a layer of normal vaginal tissue and therefore appear as a lump, not as recognizable teeth.

== See also ==
- Penile spines
- Penis captivus
- Anti-rape device
- Sheela na gig
- Vagina loquens
