= Broken Homes =

2013 novel by Ben Aaronovitch

- Author: Ben Aaronovitch
- Language: English
- Series: Peter Grant
- Release number: 4th in series
- Genre: Urban fantasy
- Publisher: Gollancz
- Publication date: 25 July 2013
- Pages: 368 pp
- ISBN: 978-0575132467
- Preceded by: Whispers Under Ground (2012)
- Followed by: Foxglove Summer (2014)

Broken Homes is the fourth novel in the Peter Grant series by the English author Ben Aaronovitch, published in 2013 by Gollancz.

== Plot ==
PC Peter Grant and DCI Nightingale are called to investigate a road traffic accident involving Robert Weil when human blood is found in his car. Subsequent enquiries lead to a shallow grave containing the body of a young woman killed by a shotgun to the face, and her fingers removed. Peter assumes Weil is a serial killer, but he and Nightingale learn that Weil is a former Little Crocodile, a member of an Oxford University dining club who were taught magic by Geoffrey Wheatcroft.

Meanwhile, PC Lesley May, still on indefinite sick leave after suffering a magical attack that resulted in catastrophic facial injuries in Rivers of London, returns to The Folly after her latest round of reconstructive surgery. Nightingale instructs Peter and Lesley in the art of magical staff-making in the hopes of drawing out the Faceless Man.

Sergeant Jaget Kumar calls in Peter to help with a case. Richard Lewis, also a Little Crocodile, committed suicide by train while showing signs of being controlled through magic. Peter uncovers a rare German grimoire handed in by a book dealer, who suspected it was stolen. CCTV coverage of the surrounding area leads Peter to the suspected thief, one Patrick Mulhern. Peter pays him a call but finds Mulhern dead by magic.

Mulhern's theft of one of Stromberg's books takes Peter to the architect's home, West Hill House. Skygarden Tower (located on the site of the real Heygate Estate) is regarded as Stromberg's most significant work. Peter finds that Stromberg had a telescope on the roof used for the sole purpose of watching Skygarden Tower.

Returning to bait a trap for the Faceless Man, Peter and Lesley attend a Goblin Market, a mobile event where the fey and magical practitioners meet to do business and socialise. They encounter Varenka Debroslova, the late Albert Woodville-Gentle's live-in nurse, who attacks them. When Nightingale hears Peter's account and examines the massive property damage she inflicted, he identifies Debroslova as Nochnye Koldunyi or Night Witch.

The team is convinced there is a connection to Skygarden Tower, so Nightingale authorizes Peter and Lesley to go undercover as new tenants. Peter discovers river spirit Nicky and an impish girl playing in the tower garden. The girl, named Sky, is a tree nymph and attached to the trees in the tower garden. Peter learns the tower is being visited by 'lots of lorries'. Peter discovers a book Folly archivist Professor Postmartin thinks significant showed up in connection to Stromberg's library. The title Wege der industriellen Nutzung von Magié (Towards the Industrial Use of Magic) convinces Peter that Stromberg built Skygarden as a magical experiment, but the details remain hazy. While Nightingale and Lesley remain skeptical, Peter is sure Stadkrone or 'city crown' is intended to act as a magical relief valve.

Later that night, Lesley and Peter are roused by a scream. They discover a biker in the process of ring-barking the trees in the garden. Lesley finds Sky, who has apparently died of natural causes. Nicky and Oberon arrive, and confirm the vandalism of the trees caused Sky's death. Finding a Transit van left behind by the biker, Peter and Lesley head to Essex to interview the van's owner. At the deserted farm given as the owner's address, Peter and Lesley are caught by a pair of thugs, one with a shotgun. Peter is able to disarm the thug, but the Night Witch arrives and overpowers Peter. Nightingale arrives and subdues the Night Witch in a magical battle. Under questioning, the Night Witch (born Varvara Sidorovna), explains she was captured during the Great Patriotic War and became a part of the Organisation Todt slave-labour effort to build Hitler's Atlantic Wall. In the confusion that followed the war, she was able to avoid repatriation, obtain new identity documents and settled down to live in London.

Lesley and Peter return to Skygarden Tower where Peter discovers a recently vacated apartment filled with explosives. Peter and Lesley evacuate the building, with Peter taking the upper floors. On the roof Peter finds the Faceless Man waiting. Peter feints a magical attack at the Faceless Man which instead detonates the explosives. The Faceless Man flees the scene by jumping off the roof. Peter manages to jump on the Faceless Man's back and ride him to the ground. Upon landing Peter attempts to arrest the Faceless Man, but is tasered by Lesley, who reveals she is working for the Faceless Man.

== Characters ==
=== Returning characters ===
- Police Constable Peter Grant: an officer in the Metropolitan Police and the first official apprentice wizard in sixty years.
- Police Constable Lesley May: an officer in the Metropolitan Police. Currently on medical leave and de facto apprentice to Nightingale
- Detective Chief Inspector Thomas Nightingale: head of the Folly and the last officially sanctioned English Wizard.
- Molly: The Folly's domestic housekeeper, of unknown species. An enthusiastic amateur cook formerly in the hearty English tradition but a convert to the school of Jamie Oliver.
- Dr Abdul Haqq Walid: world-renowned gastroenterologist and cryptopathologist.
- Harold Postmartin D.Phil., F.R.S.: official archivist and historian of English Wizardry, he operates out of the Bodleian Library.
- Abigail Kamara: annoyingly persistent teenaged girl who is the de facto founder member of the Folly's Youth Wing.
- Frank Caffrey: London Fire Brigade Fire Investigator, ex-Parachute Regiment and a key "associate" of the Folly.
- Cecilia Tyburn Thames: a.k.a. Lady Ty, "daughter" of Mama Thames and goddess of the River Tyburn.
- Effra: goddess of the River Effra and by implication presiding deity of Brixton and Kennington.
- Olympia and Chelsea: twin "daughters" of Mamma Thames, goddesses (and party girls) of Counter's Creek and the River Westbourne
- Reynard: may – or may not – be a were-fox.
- Oxley: god of the River Oxley one of the "sons" of Father Thames and his chief negotiator.
- Ash: a "son" of Father Thames and god of the River Ash.
- Zachery Palmer (a.k.a. Goblin Boy): itinerant half-fairy merchant, wide boy, chancer and practising cockney.
- Varvara Sidorovna Tamonina (a.k.a. Varenka Dobrosslova): late of the 365th Special Regiment, Red Army. Former 'nurse' (bodyguard) of the late Albert Woodville-Gentle
- The Faceless Man: one-time student of the late Albert Woodville-Gentle (a.k.a. The Faceless Man Mk I)
