= Whispers Under Ground =

2012 novel by Ben Aaronovitch

- Author: Ben Aaronovitch
- Language: English
- Series: Peter Grant
- Release number: 3rd in series
- Genre: Urban Fantasy
- Publisher: Gollancz
- Publication date: 21 June 2012
- Pages: 432 pp
- ISBN: 978-0-575-09764-3
- Preceded by: Moon Over Soho (2011)
- Followed by: Broken Homes (2013)

Whispers Under Ground is the third novel in the Peter Grant series by English author Ben Aaronovitch, published 2012 by Gollancz.

Peter Grant of Metropolitan Police department in charge of magical crimes (AKA The Folly) is called in to assist in a murder investigation. The victim, an American student found stabbed to death at Baker Street station was killed with a pot shard, raising the suspicion the death may be Falcon (police code for 'Folly') related. It quickly emerges that there is not merely a supernatural component to the case but that a secret world lies beneath the streets of the 'mundane' (non-magical) metropolis, and that the supernatural semi-human subterranean inhabitants may be no more harmless than the entirely human population who are blissfully unaware of their existence.

== Plot ==
Constables Peter Grant and Lesley May, and Detective Chief Inspector Thomas Nightingale form the magical branch of the Metropolitan Police. Grant is called in for a murder investigation at the Baker Street Underground station: the victim, American art student James Gallagher, was fatally stabbed with a pot shard.

Grant visits James's art professor, and attends an exhibition of work by Irish sculptor Ryan Carroll. Peter realises some of the pieces incorporate pottery identical to the pot shard murder weapon and a bowl found at James's flat.

Following this lead, Grant and Lesley discover a warehouse where similar pottery is taken and stored. It is owned by The Beale Corporation, which was historically the maker of 'unbreakable' pottery. Its founders were instrumental in excavating the tunnels that later became the heart of the London Underground railway.

Grant and a team investigate in the railway tunnels, but they are attacked by pallid large-eyed individuals. They pursue them, eventually reaching an Underground platform, where one of the individuals uses magic to tear the platform apart, burying Grant in the process.

While Grant is recovering in hospital, Lesley tells him she has confirmed Beale, Gallagher and Carroll are all descendants of the founders of the Unbreakable Empire Pottery corporation. James' roommate Zach also visits and accidentally mentions that he knows a pallid large-eyed man. When questioned he reveals that a group known as the Quiet People has been living underground and making pottery for the Beale corporation since the mid-Victorian Era.

Grant and Lesley investigate this group. As they talk to the Quiet People it emerges James Gallagher was courting the daughter of the chieftain of the Quiet People, which made Ryan Carroll jealous. When confronted, Carroll confesses, adding that he was also jealous of Gallagher's skill in pottery.

== Characters ==
=== Returning characters ===
- Police Constable Peter Grant; an officer in the Metropolitan Police and the first official apprentice wizard in sixty years.
- Police Constable Lesley May; an officer in the Metropolitan Police. Currently on medical leave and de facto apprentice to Nightingale
- Detective Chief Inspector Thomas Nightingale; head of the Folly and the last officially sanctioned English Wizard.
- Molly; The Folly's domestic helper, of unknown species.
- Dr Abdul Haqq Walid; world-renowned gastroenterologist and cryptopathologist.
- Abigail Kamara; annoyingly persistent teen-aged girl.
- Detective Chief Inspector Alexander Seawoll; The SIO (Senior Investigation Officer) Belgravia MIT (Murder Investigation Team)
- Detective Inspector Miriam Stephanopoulos; Belgravia MIT.
- Detective Constable Sahra Guleed; a junior member of the Belgravia MIT.
- Frank Caffrey; LFB (London Fire Brigade) Fire Investigator, ex-para and a key "associate" of the Folly.
- Cecilia Tyburn Thames; aka Lady Ty, "daughter" of Mama Thames and goddess of the River Tyburn.
- Olympia and Chelsea; school age twin "daughters" of Mama Thames, goddesses of Counter's Creek and the River Westbourne.
- Fleet; another "daughter" of Mama Thames goddess of the eponymous River Fleet.
- Toby the dog; resident of The Folly, sensitive to magic.

=== Characters introduced in this novel ===
- Albert Woodville-Gentle; suspected Little Crocodile
- Varenka Dobroslova; Albert's live-in nurse.
- James Gallagher; an American student at St. Martins.
- Zachary Palmer; James' house-mate.
- Senator Gallagher; James' father and a US Senator.
- Special Agent Kimberly Reynolds; FBI liaison officer.
- Sergeant Jaget Kumar; British Transport Police
- DC David Carey; Belgravia MIT assigned as Family Liaison.
- DC Simon Kittredge; police officer in the CTC (Counter Terrorism Command)
- Graham Beale; CEO Beale Property Services.
- Kevin Nolan: Fruit & Veg. Wholesaler.
- Ryan Carroll; an up-and-coming artist.
- Madame Teng; a visiting magical practitioner from Taiwan.
- Robert Su; assistant to Madame Teng.

== Reviews ==
- Fantasy Books Review
- Starburst Magazine
- The SF Site
- KD Did It
- Heck, Peter (June 2013). "On Books". Asimov's Science Fiction. 37 (6): 108–111.
