= The Hanging Tree (Aaronovitch novel) =

2016 novel by Ben Aaronovitch

- Author: Ben Aaronovitch
- Language: English
- Series: Peter Grant
- Genre: Urban Fantasy
- Publisher: Gollancz
- Publication date: 3 November 2016
- ISBN: 978-0575132559
- Preceded by: Foxglove Summer (2014)
- Followed by: The Furthest Station (novella, 2017)

The Hanging Tree is the sixth novel in the Peter Grant series by the English author Ben Aaronovitch.

== Plot ==
The previous book's adventure in Herefordshire left the protagonist Peter Grant deeply involved in a relationship with Beverley Brook, the resourceful young woman who had saved him from captivity by the Faerie Queen. Beverley happens to be the tutelary goddess of Beverley Brook, a small river in South London, and can often be found swimming through its waters; when Peter comes to the bank and calls her name, she might jump naked out of the water, like a salmon, directly into his arms. Peter now spends much of his time – especially his nights – in Beverley's comfortable and spacious house on the riverbank. It is there that he gets the phone call catapulting him into the whirlwind of a new adventure.

A bunch of teenagers breaking into a luxurious apartment and holding there a wild party of sex and drugs, ending with one of them dead of an overdose, is a matter for the police – but normally, not for Grant, whose very special police specialty are the cases involving magic. However, one of the teenagers involved was the daughter of a very magical creature – Cecilia Tyburn Thames aka Lady Ty, who is the goddess of the River Tyburn and the older and far stricter sister of Peter's girlfriend. Peter owes Lady Ty a favour for having once saved his life, and she wants her daughter Olivia kept out of trouble with the law – which is not easy for Peter to deliver. Peter's involvement soon grows deeper when an autopsy by pathologists who know about magic reveals that the dead girl, Christina Chorley, had died not only of a drug overdose but also of a wild and excessive use of magic – which can cause a careless practitioner's brain to undergo hyperthaumaturgical degradation, with often fatal results.

Peter plunges into the investigation, in partnership with the Muslim policewoman Sahra Guleed – who has no training in magic but makes up for it in her courage and dedication. It is far from easy, since it is needed to interview various very rich and influential people, who resent the police digging into their affairs and who use their connections in the Metropolitan Police's command structure to obstruct the investigation. To further confuse the issue, there come up traces of a long-lost manuscript by Isaac Newton, who secretly founded modern magic. This lost Third Principia, stolen by the 18th-century master criminal Jonathan Wild, supposedly deals with alchemy, the philosopher's stone and possibly even with how to attain eternal life.

Various magically-inclined individuals and groups are involved in the hunt for this treasure:

- Viscountess Helena Linden-Limmer, heiress to a long line of witches and sorceresses who disdain male-dominated magic, and her daughter Caroline who aspires to learn how to fly magically without wings or mechanical aids
- A bunch of American wizards known as the "Virginia Gentlemen", with links to the US intelligence community – who bungled badly when using magic at Falluja during the Iraq War, but are now intensively active in London
- The various not-quite-human beings known collectively as "The Demi-monde", identifying themselves as fae and strongly objecting to being called goblins. Their favourite gathering place is the sinister Chestnut Tree Pub, built around the still-existent Tyburn Tree, on which London criminals used to be hanged (the Hanging Tree of the title)
- In particular, a specific denizen of this demi-monde known as Reynard Fossman (Reynard the Fox), a highly enterprising and competent criminal rumoured to be in possession of the secret Newton manuscript
- Sir William Tyburn – an earlier deity of the River Tyburn. Considered to have been killed by the river's industrial pollution in the 19th century, suddenly reappears – using a 14th-century broadsword to kill a 21st-century underworld hired killer. On another occasion, he is seen at night running across the parks of modern London, painted blue with woad and stalking mysterious prey with spears

All of these and more are constantly running into each other, ruining each other's plans but sometimes inadvertently saving each other's lives. Gradually, however, other issues become side-lined as Peter Grant and his mentor, the veteran wizard Nightingale, find themselves heading for an explosive showdown with their arch-enemy – the very powerful and utterly ruthless wizard known as The Faceless Man. Also involved is the renegade policewoman Lesley May – once Peter Grant's valued colleague and friend, now The Faceless Man's cunning and highly resourceful accomplice.

The titanic magical battle thoroughly wrecks the luxurious apartment building where everything began. "He almost got me, you know," Nightingale recounts afterwards. "He's prepared a number of booby traps and tried to lure me into the killing zone." However, though the Faceless Man is clever and ruthless, he lacks combat experience, while Nightingale is a veteran of deadly battles against Nazi German wizards in the Second World War – enabling him to survive all traps and relentlessly pursue his foe. Meanwhile, Peter and Lesley engage in intensive magical duels of their own – but remember enough of their past to still make an effort not to kill each other.

In the event, no one is killed. The Faceless Man and Lesley make good their escape, to fight again another day. However, he is The Faceless Man no longer. His true name and antecedents had been revealed, and a wealth of information gained on his background and motivations: an upper-class English Nationalist, a racist who romanticises the Dark Ages and admires Alfred the Great and dreams of the English once again ruling the world.

In the aftermath, Newton's famed Third Principia had fallen into the hands of Lady Helena Linden-Limmer – and Nightingale is content to leave her the task of deciphering its obscure Latin. Peter goes back to his idyllic relationship with the delightful Beverley, doing some needed work on improving her eponymous Beverley Brook. However, Lady Ty invites him to a stern talk, to warn of the dangers and dilemmas inherent in a mortal man loving an immortal goddess (and vice versa).
