= The Furthest Station =

2017 novella by Ben Aaronovitch

- Author: Ben Aaronovitch
- Language: English
- Genre: Urban Fantasy
- Publisher: Gollancz
- Publication date: 30 June 2017
- ISBN: 9781473222427
- Preceded by: The Hanging Tree (2016)
- Followed by: Lies Sleeping (2018)

The Furthest Station is a novella in the Peter Grant series by English author Ben Aaronovitch. The novella is set after the fifth (Foxglove Summer) but before the sixth (The Hanging Tree) novel in the series.

Teaming up with BTP Sergeant Jaget Kumar, his parents' young neighbour Abigail Kamara, Inspector Nightingale and Toby the ghost hunting dog, PC Peter Grant tackles the mystery of ghostly encounters on the Metropolitan Line. Weirder still, the witnesses forget about their experiences mere minutes after they've occurred. As the mystery unravels, Grant and company leave London for the leafy suburbs of Chesham, Buckinghamshire, the Furthest Station on the Metropolitan Line.
