= Moon Over Soho =

2011 novel by Ben Aaronovitch

- Author: Ben Aaronovitch
- Language: English
- Series: Peter Grant
- Release number: 2nd in series
- Genre: Urban Fantasy
- Publisher: Gollancz
- Publication date: 21 April 2011
- Publication place: United Kingdom
- Media type: Print (Hardback & Paperback)
- Pages: 375 pp
- ISBN: 978-0-575-09760-5
- OCLC: 704398423
- Preceded by: Rivers of London (2011)
- Followed by: Whispers Under Ground (2012)

Moon Over Soho is the second novel in the Peter Grant series by English author Ben Aaronovitch. The novel was released on 21 April 2011 through Gollancz and was well received.

== Plot ==
Following the events of Rivers of London, Police Constable and apprentice wizard Peter Grant is called in to help investigate the brutal murder of a journalist in the downstairs toilet of the Groucho Club in London's Soho district. At the same time Peter is disturbed by a number of deaths of amateur and semi-professional jazz musicians that occurred shortly after they performed. Despite the apparently natural causes of death each body exhibits a magical signature which leads Peter to believe that the deaths are far from natural.

== Characters ==
=== Returning characters ===
- Police Constable Peter Grant; an officer in the Metropolitan Police and the first official wizard's apprentice in sixty years.
- Police Constable Lesley May; an officer in the Metropolitan Police. Currently on medical leave due to injuries suffered in the course of an earlier case.
- Detective Chief Inspector Thomas Nightingale; head of the Folly and the last officially sanctioned English Wizard.
- Molly; The Folly's domestic helper, of unknown species.
- Dr Abdul Haqq Walid; world-renowned gastroenterologist and cryptopathologist.
- Detective Sergeant Miriam Stephanopoulos; case officer of the Belgravia Murder Investigation Team and de facto Senior Investigating Officer.
- Frank Caffrey; LFB (London Fire Brigade) Fire Investigator, ex-para and a key "associate" of the Folly.
- Cecilia Tyburn Thames; a.k.a. Lady Ty, "daughter" of Mama Thames and goddess of the River Tyburn.
- Oxley; one of the "sons" of Father Thames and his chief negotiator.
- Ash; a "son" of Father Thames and god of the River Ash.

=== Characters introduced in this novel ===
- Harold Postmartin D.Phil., F.R.S.; official archivist and historian of English Wizardry; he operates out of the Bodleian Library.
- Detective Constable Sahra Guleed; a junior member of the Belgravia Murder Investigation Team.
- Detective Chief Inspector Zachary Thompson; acting Senior Investigating Officer, Belgravia Murder Investigation Team.
- Detective Constable David Trollope; Peter's liaison with the Norfolk Constabulary.
- The Pale Lady; an assassin working for the Faceless Man who kills by excising the penis of her male victims with her vagina dentata.
- Olympia and Chelsea; school age twin "daughters" of Mama Thames and goddesses of Counter's Creek and the River Westbourne respectively.
- Derek "Max" Harwood; jazz bass player and founder member of Lord Grant's Irregulars jazz quartet.
- Daniel Hossack; teacher at Westminster School, jazz musician and founder member of Lord Grant's Irregulars jazz quartet.
- James Lochrane; lecturer in 17th Century French history at Queen Mary's College, jazz drummer and founder member of Lord Grant's Irregulars jazz quartet.
- Henry May; Lesley May's father.
- Tista Ghosh; jazz aficionado and official for the Musician's Union.
- Abigail Kamara; annoyingly persistent teenaged girl.
- Cyrus Wilkinson; jazz musician, sax player and victim of his lover jazz vampire Simone
- Simone Fitzwilliam; freelance jazz journalist, Cyrus Wilkinson's lover, jazz vampire and Peter Grant's love interest

== Cover artwork ==
The US version of the cover, with controversial silhouetted figure.

As with the previous book in the series, the Gollancz cover is based upon a detail from Stephen Walter's 'The Island.'

Reviewers noted that the US publisher, Del Rey, changed the cover from one featuring an obscured black man to one in silhouette. Stephen Bitsoli, writing for The Macomb Daily, offered "two versions of that cover also exist, one black, one silhouette. Guess which one has been published?"

Del Rey later changed their cover policy and, having adopted the UK style "Walters" covers for the release of Whispers Under Ground, have announced that new editions of Moon Over Soho will match the British cover.

== Reception ==
The novel was well received, with reviewers praising the novel's humour and sense of place; the main detractor being the incomplete plot when taken as a self-contained novel, as much of the story is left unresolved.

In a review for The Daily Telegraph, Peter Ingham praised the novel's "laconic humour" and stated, "It is a rich formula with a bittersweet ending. Terrific entertainment and ripe for a series." Writer Sam Downing was also positive in his review, calling the protagonist a "fresh, likeable hero", the plot "messy and ridiculous and fun as it sounds." and stated that "It’s this kind of world-building that leaves me double-keen to see what magic Aaronovitch will work in the forthcoming third instalment." The novel was also reviewed by Joshua Hill, writing for the Fantasy Book Review, who praised the character's "casual acceptance of magic", stating that it "makes sense, when you consider the often used belief that the human mind fills in a lot of the details of things we do not understand." Hill also stated that while "this book once again blew my mind"; referring to the previous in the series; he also found that the book was "let down with utterly atrocious editing" as "when a book is published to the world, you expect the grammatical mistakes to be non-existent". The novel was well received by Jared of Pornokitsch who stated that "Moon Over Soho is very good. Ben Aaronovitch continues the successful formula of Rivers of London in bringing to the surface the endearing minutae of a city that he clearly adores." He does, however, also note that he feels the series is "[starting] to display some of the symptoms of series-itis" given that the plot of the novel is not entirely self-contained; and that the part of the plot that is self-contained is "a fairly transparent whodunnit."

The novel was reviewed by Thomas Wagner of SF Reviews, who awarded the novel three stars out of five. He stated that while he found the climax of the novel "both exhilarating and emotionally affecting" and that he "really appreciated seeing [Jazz] music featured as a dominant motif in a fantasy novel", he found that the plot "lacks the clarity it should have" and that, with respect to the villain, "the character's desire lines remain obscure." He goes on to say "I guess that's the idea, sure, but I do like a series fantasy to at least pretend to be subtle about leading me to the sequel setup."
