= Foxglove Summer =

2014 novel by Ben Aaronovitch

- Author: Ben Aaronovitch
- Language: English
- Series: Peter Grant
- Release number: 5th in series
- Genre: Urban Fantasy
- Publisher: Gollancz
- Publication date: 13 November 2014
- Pages: 384 pp
- ISBN: 978-0575132504
- Preceded by: Broken Homes (2013)
- Followed by: The Hanging Tree (2016)

Foxglove Summer is the fifth novel in the Peter Grant series by English author Ben Aaronovitch, published in 2014 by Gollancz.

== Plot ==
Peter Grant is left shaken by the sudden betrayal and defection by a highly valued colleague to whom Grant also had a strong emotional tie (as related in the previous book). Grant welcomes the chance to leave the familiar grounds of London and travel to rural Herefordshire, where the disappearance of two eleven-year old girls is a media sensation, the focus of an intensive police search - and might have grave magical implications as well.

Grant finds that the tangle of marital and extra-marital relations in a small rural community is not only a matter for gossip, but bears some supernatural ones as well. He meets with a retired wizard, traumatized by the secret magical battles of World War II, and with the wizard's granddaughter who has a very special affinity with bees. Grant gets into intensive contact with Beverley Brook, the goddess or Genius loci of Beverley Brook, a tributary of the Thames - and learns by personal experience just how rivers gain such gods. He finds that unicorns are all too real and that their horns are deadly weapons; that fairies do exist and even in the 21st century they do sometimes kidnap human children and replace them with changelings; and he meets with a real-life faerie queen, very different from the one imagined by Spenser.

As the result of all that, Grant faces the prospect of being stuck forever as a captive in the real-life fairyland - an alternative reality or Otherworld where Britain is still covered with a massive unbroken primeval forest, with no sign of the familiar towns and villages. Grant's sole of escape lies in the anti-magical effect of the Roman Empire's engineering projects and of the Romans' habit of imposing themselves on the landscape and building "roads straight as an arrow" wherever they ruled.

== Characters ==
=== Returning characters ===
- Police Constable Peter Grant; an officer in the Metropolitan Police and the first official apprentice wizard in sixty years.
- Lesley May; formerly Police Constable in the Metropolitan Police and de facto apprentice to Nightingale; now criminal associate of the faceless man and subject to an internal investigation
- Detective Chief Inspector Thomas Nightingale; head of the Folly and the last officially sanctioned English Wizard.
- Molly; The Folly's domestic helper, of unknown species.
- Dr Abdul Haqq Walid; world-renowned gastroenterologist and cryptopathologist.
- Beverley Brook; goddess of a small suburban river and consulting ecologist.

=== Characters introduced in this novel ===
- Detective Constable Dominic Croft; a member of the West Mercia Major Crimes Unit assigned as Peter's liaison.

== Reception ==
The book was well-received, with Sci-Fi Pulse praising its "warmth and sly humour", its rich worldbuilding and the plausibility of the police procedure.
