= Grays Antique Market =

Antiques market in Mayfair, London

Coordinates: 51.513587°N 0.148482°W

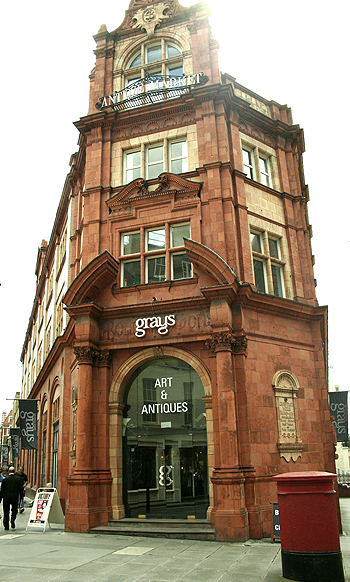
Grays Antique Market

Grays Antique Market is an antiques market in Mayfair, London, close to Bond Street station. Dealers specialise in antiques, jewellery, watches and collectables. The centre is home to nearly 100 dealers on 2 levels.

== History ==
The Grays dealers are situated in a grade-two listed building on Davies Street designed by the Edwardian architect Reginald Bloomsfield. The building was originally commissioned by water closet manufacturers, John Bolding and Son. In 1977 it was restored by Bennie Gray, the founder of Grays from a near-derelict site to the former glories of the water closet showroom.

== The Mews and the River Tyburn ==
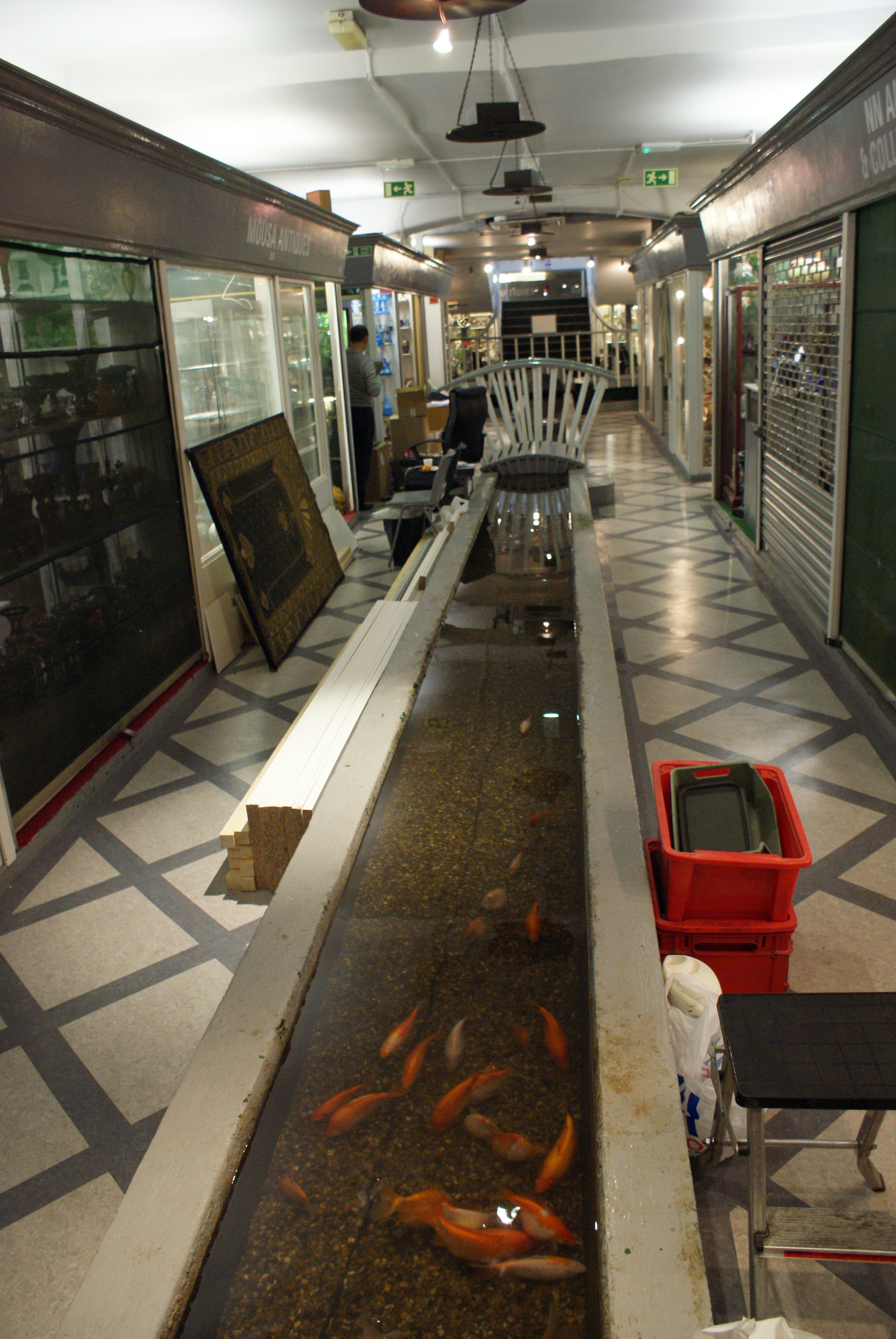
The basement river in the now closed Grays Mews

The Mews section is now closed and many of the dealers from that part of the building now trade from the sister company Alfies Antique Market located in Marylebone. The Mews section of Grays was built circa 1900 and was also taken over by Bolding in 1931.

The basement of the Mews had been under six feet of water for many years, and on closer inspection it was found that a spring arose from one end of the building. Now renovated, the shop claims that the water flowing through a conduit in its basement is the River Tyburn, which rises in Hampstead and flows underground towards the River Thames. The Londonist website describes this suggestion as "fanciful", as the modern Tyburn is contained in a conduit.

== See also ==
- Tyburn (stream)
- Alfies Antique Market
