= Anti-rape device =

Device designed to prevent or deter rape

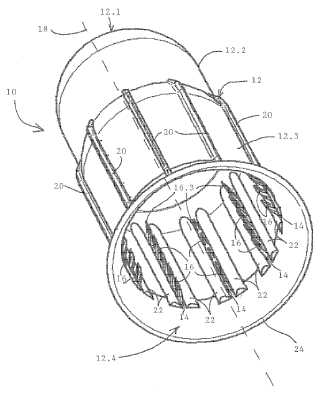
patent drawing ZA200702952 "Rape Victim Protector and Rapist Identifier"

An anti-rape device is one of a variety of devices invented for the purpose of preventing or deterring rape. The first such devices were the chastity belts of the 16th century. Although a number of devices have been proposed, none of them are in commercial production as of 2017.

== Statistics ==
Some of the most well-known anti-rape devices were proposed in South Africa, a country with a high incidence of rape and a low rate of successful convictions. South African activists argue that the legal system has not been effective in preventing or reducing rape and other violent acts against women.

According to a 2001 World Health Organization study, 20% of women worldwide had been victims of rape or attempted rape at least once in their lives. According to figures from a 2011 report from the Centers for Disease Control and Prevention, one in five women in America are victims of sexual assault. More than 40% of these reported that they were first raped before they were 18 years old.

== Types of devices ==
=== Physical deterrents ===
A number of concepts have been proposed for physical deterrents to rape, and although they attracted media attention, none of them have gone into production.

==== Jaap Haumann ====
An early prototypical anti-rape tampon was invented in late 2000 by Jaap Haumann in Clocolan, South Africa. Haumann's device was designed to resemble a tampon for ease of insertion, and consisted of a hard cylindrical plastic core containing a tensioned spring blade primed to slice when pressed against by the tip of a penis. Following activation, a portion of the tip of the penis would be removed, in effect performing a minor penectomy.

==== Rape-aXe ====
An anti-rape female condom using a different design was invented by Sonette Ehlers, a South African doctor. Ehlers was motivated to create it while working as a blood technician with the South African Blood Transfusion Service, during which time she met many rape victims. Ehlers mentioned that she was inspired to create RAPEX (later renamed to Rape-aXe) when a patient who had been raped stated, "If only I had teeth down there," suggesting the myth of the vagina dentata. Initially called RapeX, the name was changed in 2006 upon discovering that RAPEX is also an EU warning system against dangerous goods on the market.

The Rape-aXe is a latex sheath embedded with shafts of sharp, inward-facing barbs that would be worn by a woman in her vagina like a female condom. If an attacker were to attempt vaginal rape, his penis would enter the latex sheath and be snagged by the barbs, causing the attacker excruciating pain during withdrawal and giving the victim time to escape. The condom would remain attached to the attacker's body when he withdrew and could only be removed surgically, which would alert hospital staff and police. Like most condoms, Rape-aXe also usually prevents pregnancy and the transmission of HIV and sexually transmitted infections.

Rape-aXe was unveiled on August 31, 2005, in South Africa. There have been objections to Ehlers' invention, describing it as "vengeful, horrible, and disgusting" and its planned sale in pharmacies has been opposed. Concerns were raised that use of the device could possibly enrage an attacker and further jeopardize the victim. Ehlers responded saying that "many women have been killed over time, as nobody can guarantee the outcome of any rape" and that the pain caused from Rape-aXe will temporarily disable the attacker, giving the victim time to get away.

Although media coverage at the time implied that mass production was due to begin in April 2007, the device has never been marketed to the public and it remains unclear whether the product will ever be available for purchase.In a 2014 article, Deborah White and Gethin Rees compared Rape-aXe with traditional self-defense techniques and examined the technology's potential to resist sexual aggression and address gendered sexual violence.

=== Anti-date rape drug products ===
A startup called DrinkSavvy has raised funds for a line of straws and glassware that will change color if a drink has been altered with a date rape drug, intending to release its first products in December 2013. The cups, glasses, and straws/stirrers served at bars and restaurants would look normal but they would immediately change color to warn people when someone slips a date rape drug into their drink. As of 2017, no product had been released.

== See also ==
- Self-defense
