= Rivers of London (book series) =

Series of urban fantasy novels by Ben Aaronovitch

- Rivers of London (2011); Moon Over Soho (2011); Whispers Under Ground (2012); Broken Homes (2013); Foxglove Summer (2014); The Hanging Tree (2016); The Furthest Station (2017); Lies Sleeping (2018); The October Man (2019); False Value (2020); What Abigail Did That Summer (2021); Amongst Our Weapons (2022); Winter's Gifts (2023); The Masquerades of Spring (2024); Stone and Sky (2025)
- Author: Ben Aaronovitch
- Country: United Kingdom
- Language: English
- Genre: Urban Fantasy
- Publisher: Gollancz
- Published: 2011–present
- Media type: Print

The Rivers of London series (alternatively, the Peter Grant or the PC Grant series) is a series of urban fantasy novels by English author Ben Aaronovitch, and comics/graphic novels by Aaronovitch and Andrew Cartmel, illustrated by Lee Sullivan.

== Bibliography ==
=== Novels and novellas ===
No.	Title	Date	Length	ISBN
1	Rivers of London; Midnight Riot	January 2011	392 pages	9780575097568
Peter Grant, having become the first English apprentice wizard in over seventy years, must immediately deal with two different but ultimately interrelated cases. In one he must find what is possessing ordinary people and turning them into vicious killers, and in the second he must broker a peace between the two warring gods of the River Thames and their respective families.
2	Moon Over Soho	October 2011	375 pages	9780575097605
Police Constable and apprentice wizard Peter Grant is called in to help investigate the brutal murder of a journalist in the downstairs toilet of the Groucho Club in London's Soho district. At the same time, Peter is disturbed by a number of deaths of amateur and semi-professional jazz musicians that occurred shortly after they performed. Despite the apparently natural causes of death, each body exhibits a magical signature which leads Peter to believe that the deaths are far from natural.
3	Whispers Under Ground	June 2012	418 pages	9780575097643
The son of a US senator is stabbed to death, and magic involvement is suspected. An FBI agent is involved with DC Grant's case. Meanwhile, in the sewers near the tunnels of London's Underground, something is happening.
4	Broken Homes	February 2013	357 pages	9780575132467
Another killer is on the loose, and the prime suspect could be an associate of the twisted magician known as the Faceless Man. A town planner goes under a tube train, and a grimoire has been stolen. And when Peter gets word of something very odd happening in Elephant and Castle, he has to investigate whether there is a connection.
5	Foxglove Summer	November 2014	377 pages	9780575132504
Leaving London, Peter goes to a small village in Herefordshire, where there appears to be a supernatural element to the disappearance of two local girls. Having to cope with local cops, as well as local gods, Peter finds the mystery deepens.
6	The Hanging Tree	November 2016	387 pages	9780575132559
Back in London, Peter faces the legacy of London's hangings. Investigating suspicious murders in the world of the super-rich, Peter finds himself in a world different from the one he is used to investigating.
7	The Furthest Station (novella)	June 2017	144 pages	9781596068339
Peter needs to deal with commuting ghosts, forgetful commuters, and deciphering a ghost's urgent message. Set between Foxglove Summer and The Hanging Tree
8	Lies Sleeping	November 2018	406 pages	9781473207813
Peter continues the investigations into Martin Chorley.
9	The October Man (novella)	May 2019	180 pages	9781473224315
Tobias Winter, the only apprentice in the "Abteilung komplexe und diffuse Angelegenheiten" (KDA) (Department for Complex and Diffuse Matters – the German equivalent of the Folly) investigates a suspicious death in a vineyard near the Moselle. His local colleague is Vanessa Sommer, who joins the KDA at the end as well.
10	False Value	February 2020	404 pages	9781473207851
Peter Grant is facing fatherhood, and an uncertain future, with equal amounts of panic and enthusiasm. Rather than sit around, he takes a job with émigré Silicon Valley tech genius Terrence Skinner's new London start-up: the Serious Cybernetics Company.
11	What Abigail Did That Summer (novella)	March 2021	232 pages	9781473224346
Ghost hunter, fox whisperer, troublemaker. It is the summer of 2013 and Abigail Kamara has been left to her own devices. This might, by those who know her, be considered a mistake. While her cousin, police constable and apprentice wizard Peter Grant, is off in the sticks, chasing unicorns, Abigail is chasing her own mystery. Set between Foxglove Summer and The Hanging Tree, before the Furthest Station
12	Amongst Our Weapons	April 2022	432 pages	9780756414832
Peter Grant, now an expectant father, is tasked to investigate a suspicious magical death in London's silver vaults and uncover a centuries-old mystery.
13	Winter's Gifts (novella)	June 2023	294 pages	9781473224377
It follows FBI Agent Kimberley Reynolds, introduced in Whispers Underground, who has subsequently become an ally of the Folly. Set after Lies Sleeping
14	The Masquerades of Spring (novella)	September 2024	165 pages	9781645242116
The Masquerades of Spring follows Nightingale and an old acquaintance of his from The Folly in 1920s New York, tracking down the history of a cursed saxophone.Set before Rivers of London
15	Stone and Sky	July 2025	400 pages	9781473226715
When a strange large animal has been killing sheep near Aberdeen, Nightingale brings Abigail and Indigo to investigate as a training exercise. Peter brings his extended family for a holiday there to join them, including Bev, the two-year-old twins, his parents, and his father's band. There Peter is asked to look into the death of a humanoid person with gills.

=== Short Stories ===
==== Tales from the Folly ====
Tales from the Folly, a short story collection, was published in November 2020.

It contains the following stories:

PART ONE: THE PETER GRANT STORIES

- The Home Crowd Advantage
- The Domestic
- The Cockpit
- The Loneliness of the Long-Distance Granny
- King of the Rats
- A Rare Book of Cunning Device

PART TWO: THE OTHERS' STORIES

- A Dedicated Follower of Fashion
- Favourite Uncle
- Vanessa Sommer's Other Christmas List
- Three Rivers, Two Husbands and a Baby
- Moment One: Nightingale - London September 1966
- Moment Two: Reynolds - Florence, Az. 2015
- Moment Three: Tobias Winter - Meckenheim 2012

=== Graphic novels ===
The graphic novel series is cowritten by Andrew Cartmel. Initially published serially, the individual story arcs later appeared as graphic novels. All the graphic novels are published by Titan Comics.

No.	Title	Date	Length	ISBN
1	Body Work	March 2016	128 pages	9781782761877
Originally released as five monthly issues. Involves a cursed car. Set between Broken Homes and Foxglove Summer
2	Night Witch	December 2016	122 pages	9781785852930
Originally published as five monthly issues. A Russian oligarch's daughter is kidnapped. In response, he kidnaps Night Witch Varvara Sidorovna. Set between Foxglove Summer and The Hanging Tree
3	Black Mould	June 2017	128 pages	9781785855108
Originally released as five monthly issues. An investigation of a black mould infestation and a haunted ice cream van. Set between Night Witch and The Hanging Tree
4	Detective Stories	December 2017	112 pages	9781785861710
Originally released as four monthly issues. Peter encounters difficulty in making Detective. Set between The Hanging Tree and Cry Fox
5	Cry Fox	May 2018	112 pages	9781785861727
Originally released as four monthly issues. A story centred around Reynard. Set between Detective Stories and Water Weed
6	Water Weed	October 2018	112 pages	1785865455
Originally released as four monthly issues. A story starting with an encounter between the river goddesses Chelsea and Olympia and a crew of possibly magic-using drug dealers.
7	Action at a Distance	March 2019	112 pages	9781785865466
Nightingale searches for a serial killer in 1957 London.
8	The Fey and the Furious	November 2020	112 pages	9781785865862
A story centring on Peter. Set after the events of Lies Sleeping
9	Monday, Monday	November 2021	112 pages	9781787736269
Originally released as four monthly issues. A routine undercover operation leads to a Swedish werewolf.Set after the events in Amongst Our Weapons
10	Deadly Ever After	January 2023	112 pages	9781787738591
Originally released as four monthly issues
11	Here Be Dragons	December 2023	110 pages	9781787741928
Originally released as four monthly issues between July and October 2023. After a rash of strange UFO sightings above the capital, a Met Police helicopter night patrol is attacked by what can only be described as a dragon!
12	Stray Cat Blues	October 2024	112 pages	9781787744288
Originally released as four monthly issues between May and August 2024.

=== Future installments ===
Aaronovitch has announced some forthcoming titles on his personal blog.

Aaronovitch has announced several works within the same fictional universe, but set outside the chronology of the main series. These works include a short story entitled 'Cock of The Wall' focusing on Petrus Aelius Bekemetus, who Aaronovitch describes as a "temple official/Londinium wideboy" – i.e. set in Roman London which Peter Grant briefly visited in the third book of the series.

== Main characters ==
- Police Constable, later Detective Sergeant; Peter Grant; an officer in the Metropolitan Police and the first official apprentice wizard in sixty years.
- Detective Chief Inspector Thomas Nightingale; head of the Folly and the last officially sanctioned English Wizard.
- Lesley May; Police Constable colleague of Peter's in the Metropolitan Police.
- Detective Chief Inspector Alexander Seawoll; Senior Investigation Officer at the Westminster Murder Investigation Team.
- Detective Sergeant Miriam Stephanopoulos; case officer of the Belgravia Murder Investigation Team and 'right-hand man' to DCI Seawoll.
- Detective Constable, later Detective Sergeant Sahra Guleed; attached to Belgravia Murder Investigation Team, often works with Peter when his cases are in London.
- Dr Abdul Haqq Walid; world-renowned gastroenterologist and cryptopathologist.
- Frank Caffrey; LFB (London Fire Brigade) Fire Investigator, ex-para and a key "associate" of the Folly.
- Professor Harold Postmartin D.Phil. FRS BMon, "Postmartin the Pirate", Archivist and expert for the Folly.
- Molly; The Folly's domestic helper, whose species is not entirely clarified, but she has been referred to as fae-like in the novel Foxglove Summer.
- Abigail Kamara; Peter's annoyingly persistent teen-aged cousin, the de facto founding member of the Folly's Youth Wing. Lives at the same estate as Peter's parents.
- Beverley Brook; "daughter" of Mama Thames and goddess of Beverley Brook, a small river in South London; in later books, Peter Grant's girlfriend and mother of his twin daughters.
- Cecilia Tyburn Thames; aka Lady Ty, "daughter" of Mama Thames and goddess of the River Tyburn.
- Oxley; god of the River Oxley, one of the "sons" of Father Thames and his chief negotiator.
- Toby; Peter's dog, who can detect magic, indicated by yapping.
- Varvara Sidorovna Tamonina (aka. Varenka Dobroslova); Russian/Soviet witch (Night Witch), magical WWII veteran (365th Special Regiment of the Red Army), later living on her own in Britain with a magically extended lifetime.
- Indigo; a talking fox and master spy. Assigned to protect Abigail.

== Stories listed by internal chronology ==
In a blog entry, the author has provided a list of the stories, by internal chronology.

Timeframe (if known)	Story title	Published
1920s	The Masquerades of Spring (novella)	27 August 2024
1957 (framing story takes place after the events of The Hanging Tree and Water Weed)	Action at a Distance (graphic novel)	Parts 1–4, October 2018 through January 2019, collected 12 November 2019
1966	Moment #1	included in Tales from the Folly
1960s	A Dedicated Follower of Fashion (short story)	Waterstones edition of False Value, included in Tales from the Folly
January to June 2012	Rivers of London (novel)	10 January 2011
During the 2012 Summer Olympics	The Home Crowd Advantage (short story)	'London Edition' of Rivers of London and on his official website, included in Tales from the Folly
2012	Moment #3	included in Tales from the Folly
September to October 2012	Moon Over Soho (novel)	21 April 2011
	The Domestic (short story)	Waterstones edition of Whispers Under Ground, included in Tales from the Folly
December 2012	Whispers Under Ground (novel)	21 June 2012
	The Cockpit (short story)	Waterstones edition of Broken Homes, included in Tales from the Folly
March–April 2013	Broken Homes (novel)	25 July 2013
Not given	Body Work (graphic novel)	Parts 1–5 – 16 July 2015 through 20 November 2015, collected 29 March 2016
August 2013	Foxglove Summer (novel)	13 November 2014
	What Abigail Did That Summer (novella)	18 March 2021
	The Loneliness of the Long-Distance Granny (short story)	Waterstones edition of Foxglove Summer, included in Tales from the Folly
	Night Witch (graphic novel)	Parts 1–3 – 16 March 2016 through 18 May 2016, collected 1 November 2016
2014	King of the Rats (short story)	Waterstones edition of The Hanging Tree, included in Tales from the Folly
Undisclosed month in 2014	The Hanging Tree (novel)	3 November 2016 in the UK, 31 January 2017 in the US
Late July 2014	The Furthest Station (novella)	28 September 2017
	Black Mould (graphic novel)	Parts 1–5 – 12 October 2016 through 8 March 2017, collected 25 July 2017
Undisclosed month in 2014	A Rare Book of Cunning Device (audio book)	Audible special edition in 2017, included in Tales from the Folly
	Detective Stories (graphic novel)	Parts 1–4, 7 June 2017 through 3 September 2017, collected 29 December 2017
2014	Moment #2	included in Tales from the Folly
December 2014	Favourite Uncle (short story)	Waterstones edition of Lies Sleeping, included in Tales from the Folly
	Cry Fox (graphic novel)	8 November 2017, collected 26 June 2018
	Water Weed (graphic novel)	Parts 1–4, June 2018 through September 2018, collected 18 December 2018
Prologue dated 14 November 2014. Main events summer 2015, based on reference to Michelle Obama's visit to a London school (in reality, Tuesday 16 June 2015)	Lies Sleeping (novel)	18 November 2018 in the UK
	The Fey and the Furious (graphic novel)	25 November 2020
	The October Man (novella)	31 May 2019
January 2016	False Value (novel)	20 February 2020
	Vanessa Sommer’s Other Christmas List (short story)	Waterstones edition of The October Man, included in Tales from the Folly
	Amongst Our Weapons (novel)	April 2022
	Three Rivers, Two Husbands and a Baby (short story)	included in Tales from the Folly
	Cock of the Wall (short story)	unpublished as yet
	Monday, Monday (graphic novel)	1 December 2021

On the page where the official order is given, the author writes: "One caveat – the short story The Home Crowd Advantage is obviously set in 2012 during the London Olympics, but because it was written before the chronology of the series had firmed up it contains a number of anachronisms. I've learnt to be philosophical about this sort of thing." Many of the stories give vague dates, and some of those dates conflict with the official series order (compare Foxglove Summer and The Furthest Station). The short story collection Tales from the Folly includes a note above each story indicating which of the novels it is set between.

== Reception ==
Sarah Shaffi wrote for The Guardian:

The books have consistently featured on bestseller lists, with the most recent two novels – 2022's Amongst Our Weapons and 2020's False Value – going straight to No 1 on the Sunday Times bestseller list...Aaronovitch’s work has been translated into 14 languages and sold in excess of five million copies worldwide, and has its own wiki, Follypedia.

Reviewing the ninth book in the series, Amongst Our Weapons, in The Guardian, Lisa Tuttle wrote:

Aaronovitch has no peers when it comes to successfully combining the appeal of a down-to-earth police procedural with all-out fantasy: here are real places, real history and real problems complicated by the existence of magic, ancient spirits, fairies, ghosts and talking foxes, all dwelling alongside ordinary, clueless humans. His plotting is still satisfyingly inventive and the continuing characters maintain their charm in the ninth novel of a series that began in 2011.

== Adaptations ==
On 1 May 2019 it was announced that a television adaptation of Rivers of London would be produced by Simon Pegg and Nick Frost's production company, Stolen Picture. However, according to Aaronovitch, the series is "still in the same state of permanent pre-pre-production". On 7 July 2022, a new TV adaptation of the book series was announced, to be produced by Pure Fiction Television, See-Saw Films, and Unnecessary Logo—Aaronovitch's production company. On 2 November 2023, it was announced that John Jackson would be lead writer on the television adaptation. On 11 November 2024 it was announced that Sky Studios has acquired the adaptation, which will premiere on Sky in the UK.

At Dragonmeet convention in London, on 30 November 2019, it was announced that a role-playing game based on the book series would be published by Chaosium. The game was released in PDF first on 30 November 2022, with the print version released 17 April 2023

== See also ==
- GURPS Infinite Worlds#Azoth-7, also based on the premise of Isaac Newton as a major wizard.
