= Rivers of London (novel) =

2011 novel by Ben Aaronovitch

- First edition
- Author: Ben Aaronovitch
- Language: English
- Series: Rivers of London
- Release number: 1st in series
- Genre: Urban Fantasy
- Publisher: Gollancz
- Publication date: 10 January 2011
- Publication place: England
- Media type: Print (hardback and paperback), e-book
- Pages: 392 pp
- ISBN: 978-0-575-09756-8
- OCLC: 660533764
- Followed by: Moon Over Soho (2011)

Rivers of London (Midnight Riot in the US) is the first novel in the Rivers of London series by English author Ben Aaronovitch. The novel was released on 10 January 2011 through Gollancz and was well received by critics, earning a Galaxy National Book Awards nomination for Aaronovitch in the New Writer of the Year award. The author Ben Aaronovitch has subsequently written nine books in the Peter Grant Series, plus accompanying novellas, short stories, comics and graphic novels.

== Plot ==
The novel centres on the adventures of Peter Grant, a young officer in the Metropolitan Police, who, following an unexpected encounter with a ghost, is recruited into the small branch of the Met that deals with magic and the supernatural.

Peter Grant, having become the first English apprentice wizard in over seventy years, must immediately deal with two different but ultimately related cases. In one he must find what is possessing ordinary people and turning them into vicious killers, and in the second he must broker a peace between the two warring gods of the River Thames and their respective families.

== Characters ==
=== Characters introduced in this novel ===
- Police Constable Lesley May; an officer in the Metropolitan Police who, having completed her mandatory probationary period, is expected to go far.
- Police Constable Peter Grant; an officer in the Metropolitan Police who, having completed his mandatory probationary period, is expected to do paperwork.
- Inspector Neblett; Peter and Lesley's shift commander and line manager at Charing Cross Police Station.
- Detective Chief Inspector Thomas Nightingale; head of the Folly and the last officially sanctioned English Wizard.
- Dr Abdul Haqq Walid; world-renowned gastroenterologist and cryptopathologist, a "gingery" Scot who converted to Islam.
- Detective Chief Inspector Alexander Seawoll; The SIO (Senior Investigation Officer) of the MIT (Murder Investigation Team) assigned to investigate the death of William Skirmish.
- Detective Sergeant Miriam Stephanopoulos; DCI Seawoll's case manager.
- Augusta Coopertown; Danish expatriate living in Hampstead.
- Brandon Coopertown; her husband.
- Molly; The Folly's domestic helper, of unknown species.
- Mama Thames; Goddess of the River Thames.
- Beverley Brook; "daughter" of Mama Thames and goddess of a small river in South London.
- Frank Caffrey; LFB (London Fire Brigade) Fire Investigator, ex-para and a key "associate" of the Folly.
- Father Thames; aka "The Old Man of the River" God of the River Thames or at least the bits above Teddington Lock.
- Oxley; one of the "sons" of Father Thames and his chief negotiator.
- Anna Maria de Burgh Coppinger; aka Isis, wife of Oxley.
- Cecilia Tyburn Thames; aka Lady Ty, another "daughter" of Mama Thames and goddess of the River Tyburn.
- Deputy Assistant Commissioner Richard Folsom; a highly placed ally of Lady Ty.
- Fleet; another "daughter" of Mama Thames goddess of the River Fleet.
- Lea; the most senior "daughter" of Mama Thames and goddess of the River Lea. It's strongly implied that she pre-dates Mama Thames but as a tributary of the Thames has accepted her authority.
- Brent; a nursery age "daughter" of Mama Thames and goddess of the River Brent.
- Ash; a "son" of Father Thames and god of the River Ash.
- Richard "Lord" Grant; Peter's father, a jazz musician and heroin addict.
- Isaac Newton; the founder of Modern Magic (in addition to his more widely known scientific achievements).
- Henry Pyke; vengeful revenant actor, formerly of The Theatre Royal, Covent Garden

== Cover artwork ==
The US version of the cover, with controversial silhouetted figure.

The Gollancz cover is based upon a detail from Stephen Walter's artwork The Island.

The American edition of the book shows a figure in silhouette carrying a gun in one hand, with a ball of fire floating in the other. Earlier editions of the cover showed the character's face in photographic detail, but a later version reduced this to a silhouette. This change drew criticism for appearing to intentionally disguise the fact that the book's protagonist was black, and Del Rey later changed their cover policy. Having adopted the UK style "Walters" covers for the release of Whispers Under Ground, they announced that new editions of Midnight Riot will match the British cover.

== Background ==
The novel draws a great deal on the historical and mythological background of London and the Thames Valley.

=== The rivers ===
Some of the characters are strongly associated with the River Thames and its tributaries. Most prominent after the Thames itself include Beverley Brook, Lady Ty, Oxley and Lea, and mentions are given to the Effra, Ash, Brent and Crane.

== Reception ==
The novel was well received, with reviewers citing Aaronovitch's juxtaposition of the magical and the mundane and his storytelling prowess as the novel's main attractors.

Writing for The Morning Star Mat Coward stated, of Aaronovitch himself, "he can really write, with a light touch to his humour and characters that really stand out." and followed this with "This novel is a pure delight and I can't wait for the next in the series." Fellow writer Sam Downing praised the novel's humour and characters and found it "one of those 'Aww, I’m at the office already? I wanna keep reading nooooow'-style books." The novel was also well reviewed by Saxon Bullock of SFX who awarded it five out of five stars and stated the novel was "Witty, imaginative and gripping, Rivers of London is a great example of how it's not always about having an astoundingly new idea.", praising Aaronovitch's knowledge of London and his fresh and "clever" approach. Rivers of London was also well reviewed by Fantasy Book Review, with reviewer Joshua Hill stating "Ben Aaronovitch has written a book that never left me disappointed in the choices he made as author, nor in the choices of his characters," referring partly to the characters subdued reaction to the supernatural, which is uncommon in this genre. He further states that "All in all, you have to read this book. Whether you like good writing, good fantasy or urban fantasy, good characters, or simply a breath-taking story set in a breath-taking world, this book is for you."

The novel did not, however, receive universal praise. Writing for SF Reviews, Thomas Wagner awarded the novel three out of a possible five stars, stating that "the more frenzied and harrowing the action becomes, the more it feels exhausting and excessive rather than thrilling." and citing the novel's inconsistent tone as another detractor. Tempering this, however, he does describe the novel's plot as "surprising and imaginative" and the novel as a whole "highly energized". In a review for Londonist, Matt Brown found the plot to be unbelievable, stating that "Emotion is almost entirely absent." and quipping "If you’re looking for a deep novel, this is more trickling Walbrook than mighty Thames." He does, however, also praise the book's "pace, ingenuity and creativity".

The unabridged audio recording of the novel, read by Kobna Holdbrook-Smith, was well received and was shortlisted for the Crimefest Award 2012.

== Foreign editions ==
As well as the American edition, Rivers of London has been translated into 14 languages including French, German, Italian, Spanish, Polish, Hungarian, Portuguese, Japanese and Czech.
