= Ben Aaronovitch =

British author and screenwriter (born 1964)

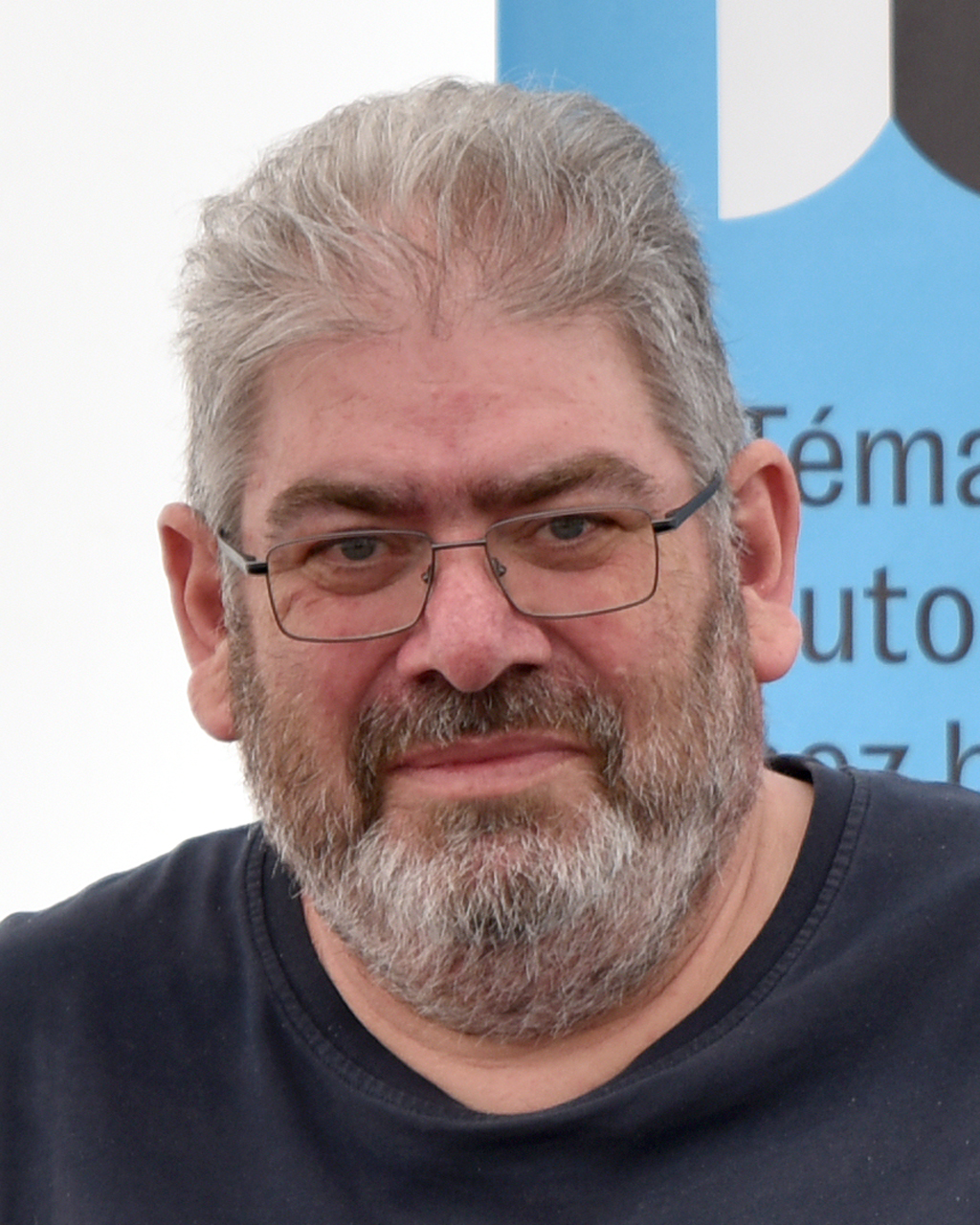
- Ben Aaronovitch, Prague (2023)
- Born: Ben Dylan Aaronovitch; 22 February 1964 (age 62); Camden, London, England
- Occupations: Author, screenwriter
- Spouse: Marie Fofana (m. 1992)
- Relatives: Sam Aaronovitch (father); Owen Aaronovitch (brother); David Aaronovitch (brother)
- Writing career
- Notable works: Rivers of London; Remembrance of the Daleks

Ben Dylan Aaronovitch (born 22 February 1964) is an English author and screenwriter. He is the author of the series of novels Rivers of London. He also wrote two Doctor Who serials in the late 1980s and spin-off novels from Doctor Who and Blake's 7.

== Biography ==
Born in Camden, Aaronovitch is the son of the economist Sam Aaronovitch who was a senior member of the Communist Party of Great Britain, and the younger brother of actor Owen Aaronovitch and journalist David Aaronovitch. He attended Holloway School.

Aaronovitch left school with no particular plan. "Instead of going to university I basically faffed about. I had a series of terrible jobs, the kind you get when you have no qualifications." These included working as a security guard for Securitas, which he says taught him "to understand shoplifting a lot better. ... So it did come in quite handy later, for work". During one of the short-term jobs he submitted some scripts to the BBC, which led to him writing Doctor Who stories, and finally, while working at Waterstones, publishing his first Rivers of London novel. The book rapidly became a word-of-mouth success, enabling him to write full-time. He is passionate about diversity in literature, and in 2020 he founded the Future Worlds Prize, then known as the Gollancz and Rivers of London BAME SFF Award, aimed at opening up science fiction and fantasy publishing to more diverse writers.

In 2023 it was announced that Rivers of London would be adapted for TV as a co-production between Pure Fiction Television, See-Saw Films and Aaronovitch's own production company, Unnecessary Logo.

Aaronovitch lives in Wimbledon, London. He has a son.

=== Doctor Who and television work ===
Aaronovitch wrote two Doctor Who serials, Remembrance of the Daleks (1988) and Battlefield (1989), for BBC television, and also the novelization of the former.

He wrote one episode for Casualty (1990) and was then a regular writer on the science fiction series Jupiter Moon.

He subsequently wrote or co-wrote three Doctor Who spin-off novels in the Virgin Publishing New Adventures range; he created the character Kadiatu Lethbridge-Stewart who became a semi-regular in the New Adventures. He has written a novel and several short stories published by Big Finish Productions featuring the character of Bernice Summerfield, who was originally developed in the New Adventures. He also co-wrote a Doctor Who audio drama for Big Finish, and has written a number of Blake's 7 spin-off audio dramas.

==== Proposed serials ====
In May 1987, Aaronovitch submitted Knight Fall to the Doctor Who production office for season 25. The story concerned privatization. Script editor Andrew Cartmel liked the story ideas, but felt that the script was inappropriate for the series and had too many supporting characters.

After failing to feature Aaronovitch's Knight Fall storyline to production, Aaronovitch submitted a story in June 1987, entitled Transit. The story would see the Doctor and Ace in the future, land in a metro station, and discover transportation portals that led throughout the Solar System, but one of the portals is a gateway to hell. Even though Aaronovitch's scripts of Transit never came to fruition, he would adapt the story as a book for Virgin New Adventures series in December 1992.

In 1988, Aaronovitch submitted a three-part adventure story called Bad Destination for the 27th season of Doctor Who. The story would feature The Doctor seeing Ace as a captain of a hospital spaceship which is under attack by the Metatraxi. It went unused when declining audiences led the BBC to cancel Doctor Who in September 1989 after its 26th season. In July 2011, Big Finish Productions released the story as Earth Aid, by Aaronovitch and Cartmel.

== Works ==
=== Television ===
==== Doctor Who ====
- Remembrance of the Daleks (1988)
- Battlefield (1989)

==== Casualty ====
- Results (1990)

==== Jupiter Moon ====
- Episode 69 (1990)
- Episode 70 (1990)
- Episode 80 (1990)
- Episode 81 (1990)
- Episode 95 (1990)
- Episode 119 (1996)
- Episode 120 (1996)
- Episode 131 (1996)
- Episode 132 (1996)
- Episode 148 (1996)

==== Dark Knight ====
- Stonegod (2001)

=== Audio dramas ===
==== Blake's 7 ====
- Rebel (2007)
- When Vila Met Gan (2008)
- Eye of the Machine (2008)
- Blood and Earth (2009)

==== Doctor Who ====
- Earth Aid (with Andrew Cartmel; 2011)

=== Novels ===
==== Doctor Who ====
Novelizations:

- Remembrance of the Daleks

Virgin New Adventures:

- Transit
- The Also People
- So Vile a Sin (with Kate Orman)

==== Rivers of London ====
- Rivers of London (published as Midnight Riot in the US) (2011) ISBN 9781782761877
- Moon Over Soho (2011) ISBN 9780345524591
- Whispers Under Ground (2012) ISBN 9780345524614
- Broken Homes (2013) ISBN 9780575132467
- Foxglove Summer (2014) ISBN 9780575132504
- The Hanging Tree (3 November 2016) ISBN 9780575132559
- The Furthest Station (28 September 2017) ISBN 9781473222427—novella, set between Foxglove Summer and The Hanging Tree
- Lies Sleeping (6 November 2018) ISBN 9781473207813
- The October Man (31 May 2019) – novella, set after Lies Sleeping in Germany, with Tobias Winter as the main character
- False Value (20 February 2020) ISBN 9781473207851 (Hardback); ISBN 9781473207868 (Export Trade Paperback); ISBN 9781473207882 (eBook)
- Tales from the Folly (November 2020) – short story collection
- What Abigail Did That Summer (18 March 2021) – novella ISBN 9781473224346 (Hardback); ISBN 9781473224360 (eBook)
- Amongst our Weapons (7 April 2022) ISBN 9781473226661 (Hardback)
- Winter's Gifts (novella) (8 June 2023) (Hardback / eBook / AudioBook)
- The Masquerades of Spring (novella) (5 September 2024) ISBN 1473224403 (Hardback / eBook / AudioBook)
- Stone and Sky (8 July 2025) ISBN 9780756407230 (Hardback / eBook / AudioBook)

==== Others ====
- Genius Loci

=== Short stories ===
- Gone Fishing in Short Trips: Time Signature
- Walking Backwards for Christmas in Something Changed
- The Evacuation of Bernice Summerfield Considered as a Short Film by Terry Gilliam in Missing Adventures

==== Rivers of London series ====
The short stories below are published in Tales from the Folly:

- The Home Crowd Advantage in the 'London Edition' of Rivers of London and on Aaronovitch's blog
- The Domestic in the special Waterstones edition of Whispers Under Ground
- The Cockpit in the special Waterstones edition of Broken Homes
- The Loneliness of the Long Distance Granny in the special Waterstones edition of Foxglove Summer
- A Rare Book of Cunning Device in a special Audible-only edition read by Kobna Holdbrook-Smith
- King of the Rats in the special Waterstones edition of The Hanging Tree
- Favourite Uncle in the special Waterstones edition of Lies Sleeping
- A Dedicated Follower of Fashion
- Vanessa Sommer's Other Christmas List
- Three Rivers, Two Husbands and a Baby
- Three short pieces, labelled Moments, published on Aaronovitch's website
  - Moment One: London September 1966
  - Moment Two: Reynolds-Florence, Az. 2014
  - Moment Three: Tobias Winter -Meckenheim 2012

=== Comics ===
==== Rivers of London – Body Work ====
- Body Work #1 – 16 July 2015
- Body Work #2 – 19 August 2015
- Body Work #3 – 16 September 2015
- Body Work #4 – 21 October 2015
- Body Work #5 – 20 November 2015
- Body Work (collection/graphic novel) – 29 March 2016 ISBN 9781782761877

==== Rivers of London – Night Witch ====
- Night Witch #1 – 16 March 2016
- Night Witch #2 – 13 April 2016
- Night Witch #3 – 18 May 2016
- Night Witch (collection/graphic novel) – 1 November 2016 ISBN 9781785852930

==== Rivers of London – Black Mould ====
- Black Mould #1 – 12 October 2016
- Black Mould #2 – 16 November 2016
- Black Mould #3 – 21 December 2016
- Black Mould #4 – 1 February 2017
- Black Mould #5 – 8 March 2017
- Black Mould (collection/graphic novel) – 25 July 2017 ISBN 9781785855108

==== Rivers of London – Detective Stories ====
- Detective Stories #1 – 7 June 2017
- Detective Stories #2 – 12 July 2017
- Detective Stories #3 – 9 August 2017
- Detective Stories #4 – 13 September 2017
- Detective Stories (collection/graphic novel) – 29 December 2017 ISBN 9781785861710

==== Rivers of London – Cry Fox ====
- Cry Fox #1 - 8 November 2017
- Cry Fox #2 - 13 December 2017
- Cry Fox #3 - 17 January 2018
- Cry Fox #4 - 25 April 2018
- Cry Fox (collection/graphic novel) – 26 June 2018 ISBN 9781785861727

==== Rivers of London – Water Weed ====
- Water Weed #1 - 20 June 2018
- Water Weed #2 - 18 July 2018
- Water Weed #3 - 15 August 2018
- Water Weed #4 - 19 September 2018
- Water Weed (collection/graphic novel) – 30 November 2018 ISBN 9781785865459

==== Rivers of London – Action at a Distance ====
- Action at a Distance #1 - 17 October 2018
- Action at a Distance #2 - 21 November 2018
- Action at a Distance #3 - 19 December 2018
- Action at a Distance #4 - 20 January 2019
- Action at a Distance (collection/graphic novel) – 1 November 2019 ISBN 9781785865466

==== Rivers of London – The Fey & The Furious ====
- The Fey & The Furious #1 - 6 November 2019
- The Fey & The Furious #2 - 11 December 2019
- The Fey & The Furious #3 - 8 January 2020
- The Fey & The Furious #4 - 5 February 2020
- The Fey & The Furious (collection/graphic novel) – 1 November 2020 ISBN 9781785865862

==== Rivers of London – Monday, Monday ====
- Monday, Monday #1 - 7 July 2021
- Monday, Monday #2 - 18 August 2021
- Monday, Monday #3 - 1 September 2021
- Monday, Monday #4 - 6 October 2021
- Monday, Monday (collection/graphic novel) – 5 January 2021 ISBN 9781787736269

==== Rivers of London – Deadly Ever After ====
- Deadly Ever After #1 - 18 May 2022
- Deadly Ever After #2 - 22 June 2022
- Deadly Ever After #3 - 10 August 2022
- Deadly Ever After #4 - 21 September 2022
- Deadly Ever After (collection/graphic novel) – 25 January 2023 ISBN 9781787738591

==== Rivers of London – Here Be Dragons ====
- Here Be Dragons #1 - 12 July 2023
- Here Be Dragons #2 - 23 August 2023
- Here Be Dragons #3 - 6 September 2023
- Here Be Dragons #4 - 28 October 2023
- Here Be Dragons (collection/graphic novel) – 30 January 2024 ISBN 9781787740921
