= Adi (asura) =

Asura in Hindu mythology

Āḍi (Sanskrit: आडि) is an Asura in Hindu mythology who appears in the Matsya Purāṇa. He was the son of the demon Andhaka, who was killed by the god Shiva.

== Story ==
After discovering that Pārvatī was practicing tapasya in the forest, he recalled his father's death at the hands of Shiva. He decided to avenge his father by killing Shiva, despite knowing that he was no match for the deity.

At the time of his father's death, Āḍi did tapasya to please Brahmā who appeared before him asking what he desired. Āḍi replied that he sought immortality, to which Brahmā made clear that all living beings must eventually die. Āḍi clarified his request, stating that he would only die when he had changed form. Brahmā took advantage of this ambiguity and granted him the power of transformation.

Āḍi was prepared to face Shiva. Armed with this newfound power from Brahmā, he entered Shiva's private quarters in the guise of a snake, evading the watch of Shiva's attendant Vīrabhadra. When he tried to approach Shiva in the guise of Pārvatī, Shiva offered an affectionate greeting. However, he soon became suspicious and got to know his true form through Yog.

Realizing the true nature of the Asura, Shiva stuck him on his genitals with the Vajra, killing him instantly.

== Another Version ==
Another version of the story tells us that Brahma granted him another boon that he can learn warfare under Shiva. Adi started to train under Shiva. However, after a few years he started to trouble the residents of Mount Kailasha. Adi appeared as Parvati in front of Shiva and asked him for one more chance. However Shiva realised this was Adi and killed him with his trishula. Adi begged for forgiveness and Shiva gave him moksha.

The above mentioned story is not mentioned in texts while the former story is well known.

== See also ==
- Andhaka
- Jalandhara
