= Andhaka =

Demon in Hinduism

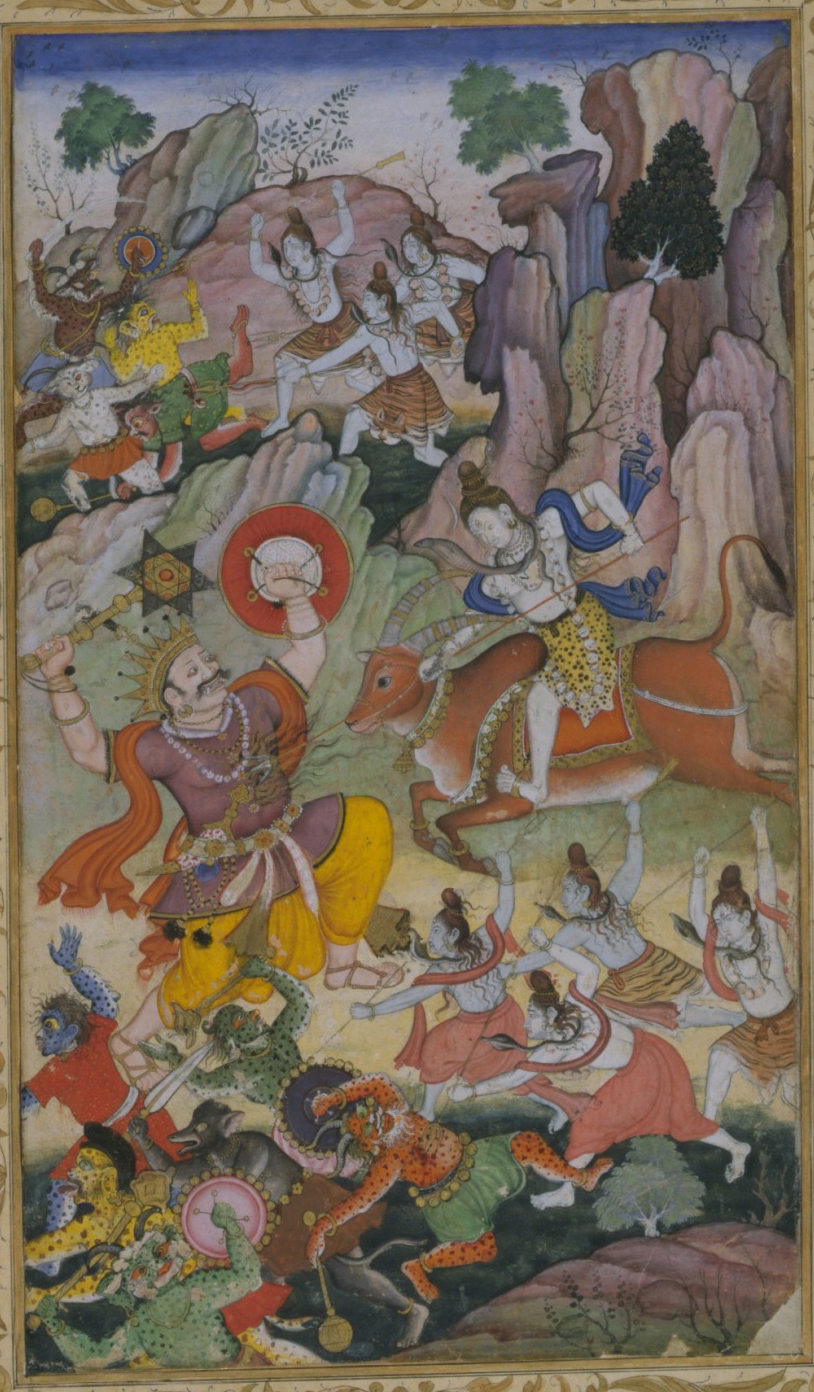
- Shiva slays Andhaka, c. 1590, a translation of Harivamsa commissioned by Akbar
- Affiliation: Asura
- Gender: Male

Genealogy
- Parents: Hiraṇyākṣa (adoptive father in some Puranas); Shiva and Parvati (parents; in some Puranas)
- Children: Adi

In Hindu literature, Andhaka (Sanskrit: अन्धक, IAST: Andhaka; lit. "He who darkens") refers to a malevolent asura, whose pride is vanquished by Shiva and Parvati.

His story finds mention in various Hindu texts, including the Matsya Purāṇa, the Kūrma Purāṇa, the Liṅga Purāṇa, the Padma Purana, and the Shiva Purana. He is believed to have one thousand heads, and one thousand arms, and also having two thousand eyes. In another version, he has two thousand arms, and two thousand legs. In some versions of his story, Andhaka is described as a son of Shiva and Parvati.

== In Puranic Scriptures ==
=== Shiva Purana ===
In the Shiva Purana, when Shiva was meditating on Mount Mandara, Parvati was in a playful mood and covered Shiva's eyes. This caused the whole universe to become shrouded in darkness. The sweat that oozed out of Parvati's hands, due to touching Shiva's powerful third eye, fell to the ground and created a horrible looking and blind boy. Parvati was terrified on seeing him, but Shiva scolded her, claiming that since he was born due to their physical contact, he was their child.

When the demon king Hiraṇyākṣa performed penance to please Shiva in order to beget a child, Shiva gifted the boy to him and named him Andhaka due to his blindness. After Hiraṇyākṣa's death by Varaha (avatar of Vishnu), Andhaka became the new king, but was not regarded as an Asura since he was born of the Devas. Disowned by majority of his clan, he performed a severe penance to please Brahmā. Brahmā thus appeared to him and offered him a boon. Andhaka requested that Brahmā give and make divine vision and immortality. Brahmā fulfilled Andhaka these wishes, but warned him that he could still be killed by Shiva. Andhaka went back to his kingdom and subdued all his opponents as well as the Devas.

Andhaka asked his minister if there was anyone who could equal him in strength, grandeur and riches. The minister told him that he did not have the companionship of a beautiful woman. The world's most beautiful woman, he explained, was Parvati, who belonged to a matted ascetic who lived on Mount Kailāśa. Andhaka was advised that if he wished to be truly matchless, he should possess her. Andhaka sent a messenger to Shiva with the demand to hand over his wife. Andhaka attacked Shiva with his greatest warriors, but they were defeated by Shiva's army.

One day, when Shiva was performing meditation in forest, Andhaka thought of attacking Mandar mountain. Fierce war took place between gods and danavs.

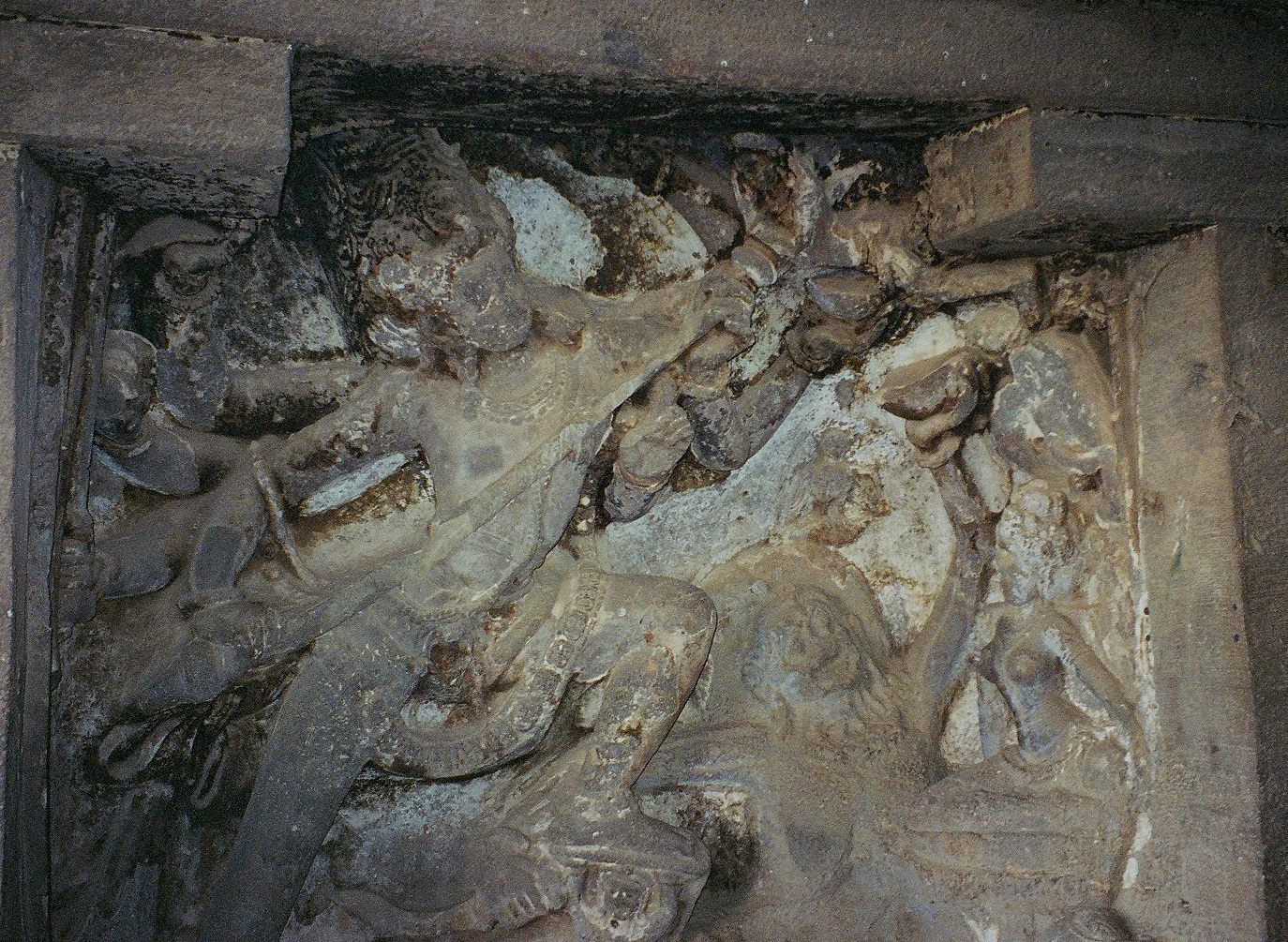
Shiva impaling Andhaka, while a Matrika (right bottom) collects his blood. Ellora Caves

Andhaka's trusted general Bali single-handedly defeated all the gods and swallowed them. Shiva fired powerful weapons at Bali, which forced him to disgorge all the gods. In retaliation, Shiva swallowed Śukra, the guru of the Asuras. Andhaka then launched an attack on Indra. Shiva intervened to save Indra and assaulted the demon with his trident. However, whenever Andhaka's blood fell on the ground, a copy of him would spawn. Vishnu created several Mātṛkās to drink the blood of the demon every time he was hurt, preventing the spread of new demons. Finally, Shiva decapitated Andhaka. According to Shiva Purana, in a twist of events, since Andhaka had chanted Shiva's name in repentance after which he was told of his biological parentage and he was made a Gaṇa chief.

==== Alternate account ====
There is another version in the Purāṇa in which Andhaka's birth story and disownment by his clan remain the same. His kingdom was taken over by his cousins, including Prahlāda, when he went to the forest to perform penance to Brahmā. During his penance, he abstained from both water and food while severing his own limbs as an act of desperation to please Brahmā.

His actions proved successful. A pleased Brahmā appeared before him and offered him a boon of his choice. Andhaka asked Brahmā to repair his vision and also asked him to make him immortal. Brahmā replied that he could not make him immortal since all that takes birth must die, although he could choose the condition of his death. Andhaka asked that he could only be killed if he lusted after a woman who was like a mother. Brahma agreed and granted all his boons.

When Andhaka returned to his kingdom, his cousins became fearful of his new power and returned his kingdom as well as their own. After becoming the lord of all Asuras, Andhaka fought with the Devas along with his army and conquered heaven. He then proceeded to conquer the Nāgas, Gandharvas, Rākṣasas, Yakṣas and the humans. He thus became the lord of the three worlds.

He was a cruel ruler and disrespected the Vedas, the Brahmins and the Devas. Once while on a journey, Andhaka happened to visit Mount Mandara. Charmed by the beauty of the mountain, he decided to stay there and ordered his three generals, Duryodhana, Vighasa and Hasti, to search for a place suitable to stay.

While searching, his generals found a cave where a hermit was meditating and saw a beautiful woman along with him. They told their master about this, who ordered them to bring the woman to him. The hermit happened to be Shiva and the woman his wife Parvati. When they told the ascetic to hand over the woman to their master, Shiva refused, stating that if their master wanted her, he should take her himself.

When his generals informed Andhaka about this, he became furious and proceeded to fight Shiva. With his army of Asuras, Andhaka fought Nandi and Shiva's Gaṇas, but were defeated and forced to flee. Andhaka soon returned to battle, which lasted for seven hundred years.

Vishnu, Brahmā and the Devas joined the battle against Andhaka and his army. Andhaka's general Vighasa swallowed all the gods, to which Shiva retaliated by charging with his bull and plowing into the demon. Śukra, the preceptor of Asura, brought the dead Asuras back to life by using his medicinal herb, the Mṛtasañjīvanī. Shiva ordered the Gaṇas to capture Śukra. When they brought him to Shiva, he swallowed the demon guru.

Shiva attacked Andhaka with his trident, but every drop of Andhaka's blood that fell to the ground spawned another demon like him. Shiva requested the goddess Chandi to drink the blood while he took care of the rest of Andhaka's duplicates. After vanquishing the remaining Asura, Shiva impaled Andhaka with his trident and lifted him thereupon, where he remained for a very long time. Once he had realised that the woman whom he was lusting for was his own mother and her husband was his own father, he felt deeply grieved and ashamed of his actions. He sincerely prayed to Shiva for forgiveness. Shiva, the most humble one, forgave him and made him the chief of the Gaṇas.

=== Vāmana Purāṇa ===
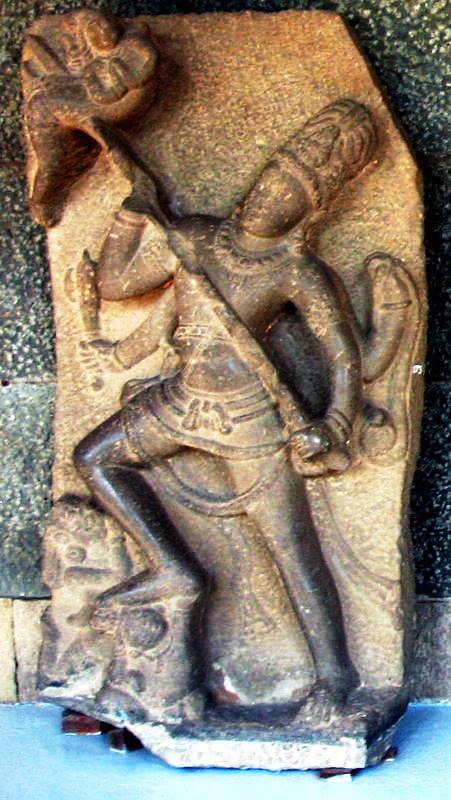
Shiva spears Andhaka

In the Vāmana Purāṇa, the story of Andhaka's birth remains same. Andhaka was the son of Hiraṇyākṣa and cousin of Prahlāda. Andhaka and Prahlāda, along with their army defeated the Devas, making Prahlāda the king of the three worlds. Sometime later, Prahlāda battled Vishnu, but lost the battle due to a curse the sages have placed upon him. After his loss, he appointed Andhaka as king and successfully acquires Vishnu's forgiveness. Upon returning, Andhaka tries to make him king again, but is met with refusal. At one point, Mahiṣāsura and Tārakāsura are killed by the gods, a feat which Andhaka thought was impossible.

After this incident, Andhaka came to desire a beautiful wife and was informed about Parvati, said to be the most beautiful woman in the world. Unaware that Parvati is his mother, Andhaka makes his way to Shiva's abode. There he tried to abduct Parvati, but she assumed a hundred forms and knocked him unconscious in battle. Andhaka fled back to Pātāla with the intention to recuperate and make another attempt at procuring Parvati.

Prahlāda tried to dissuade him. He revealed to Andhaka his true origins about being born from the sweat of Shiva when Parvati covered his eyes. His explanation falls on deaf ears and he fails to persuade the Asura. Andhaka attacked Shiva and the other deities with his army, most of whom were obliterated. Andhaka then disguised himself as Shiva to fool Parvati, but she managed to recognised him and hid among her servants. Unable to find her, Andhaka returns to the battle.

Kārttikeya and Gaṇeśa, accompanied by the Gaṇas, destroyed Andhaka's chariot. Shiva engaged him in battle and pierced his heart, but Andhaka was able to recover and strike Shiva with his mace. The blood that fell on the ground from the wound gave rise to the eight forms of Bhairava.

Shiva impaled Andhaka on his trident and lifted him upon it. The sweat that emanated from Shiva gave rise to a girl and a boy of the colour of charcoal, who proceed to consume Andhaka's blood before it falls onto the ground. Shiva names the girl Cārcikā and the boy Maṅgala. He holds Andhaka impaled on his trident for thousands of years, reducing his body to a mere skeletal appearance. Andhaka begged for forgiveness and prostrated in front of Shiva as his father and Parvati as his mother. He is forgiven and made a Gaṇa chief. Shiva takes him to the Mandara mountain where Parvati also blesses the same boon to him and he later becomes famous by the name of Bhṛṅgi.

=== Kūrma Purāṇa ===
In the Kūrma Purāṇa too, Andhaka is the natural son of Hiraṇyākṣa and becomes the king of the Asuras after the death of Prahlāda. Like other variants, he lusts after Parvati and goes to Mount Mandara to abduct her when Shiva is away. Shiva had entrusted Nandi to guard his household and the gods including Vishnu, to attend to and protect Parvati. When Andhaka arrives, Nandi battles with him and pierces him with a trident. Upon spilling of his blood, a thousand more Asura like him spawn and defeat Nandi and the Devas. Nandi prays to Vishnu for aid.

When Vishnu arrives he creates several Mātṛkā goddesses who vanquish the demons. When Shiva returns, Andhaka returns in another attempt to abduct Parvati. Shiva and Vishnu wage battle against Andhaka and his army. Shiva succeeds in impaling Andhaka on his trident and begins to dance. By his mere touch, Andhaka's sins are burned away and he begs for forgiveness. He is later named a Gaṇa chief. Shiva also makes Andhaka a handsome man who then prostrates before Parvati in repentance. Parvati forgives him and accepts him as her son.

=== Matsya Purāṇa ===
In the Matsya Purāṇa, Andhaka, the son of Hiraṇyākṣa, tries to abduct Parvati from Shiva. A battle ensues in the Mahākāla forest and the blood that flows from Andhaka gives rise to a thousand more demons. Shiva creates numerous divine mothers, the Mātṛkā, who drink the demon's blood every time it issues forth. After they become satiated, Vāsudeva creates the goddess Śuṣkarevatī who drinks the blood of all the demons and kills them. When Shiva is about to blow the final strike, Andhaka surrenders and begs for forgiveness by praying to him. Pleased by his devotion, Shiva makes him a Gaṇa.

=== Harivaṃśa Purana ===
According to the Harivaṃśa Purāṇa, Andhaka was a Daitya and the son of Diti and the sage Kaśyapa. After the defeat of Daityas by Vishnu, Diti pleaded with Kaśyapa to give her such a son who couldn't be defeated by the gods. Kaśyapa granted her boon and told her that only Shiva had the power to destroy her son, as no one could match his power. Kaśyapa then touched her belly and a child was born with a thousand eyes and limbs. Although he wasn't blind, Andhaka walked like a blind person, thus bearing the name. Over time, Andhaka became arrogant since he cannot be harmed by anyone.

At one time, Andhaka went to the court of Indra, abducted all the Apsaras, and defeated all of the gods in battle. He also hindered the performance of yajñas by the gods. Being so tormented, the gods approached Nārada for assistance. Nārada visited Andhaka to counsel with him. Andhaka was intrigued by the fragrant garland of Mandara flowers worn by Nārada and inquired as to the source of the flowers. Nārada tells him that the flowers come from the Mandara forest, protected by guards so that no one may enter without Shiva's permission.

Andhaka conversed with Mount Mandara, informing the mountain of his invulnerability, and asked about the whereabouts of the forest. The mountain refuses to answer and disappears. Andhaka erupts in anger and uproots the entire mountain and with the help of his Asura army. They manage to grind the mountain down, destroying all of its natural beauty. Once Shiva become informed of this, he blesses the mountain with a boon which restored it to its original splendor. The mountain summits began to kill the Asuras who had attempted to destroy them. Upon seeing this, Andhaka calls out the owner of the mountain, wishing to burn the entire Mandara mountain. In response, Shiva, with his mace, mounts his bull and charges Andhaka. When Shiva releases his spear, it strikes the demon in the chest and reduces him to ash.

=== Liṅga Purāṇa ===
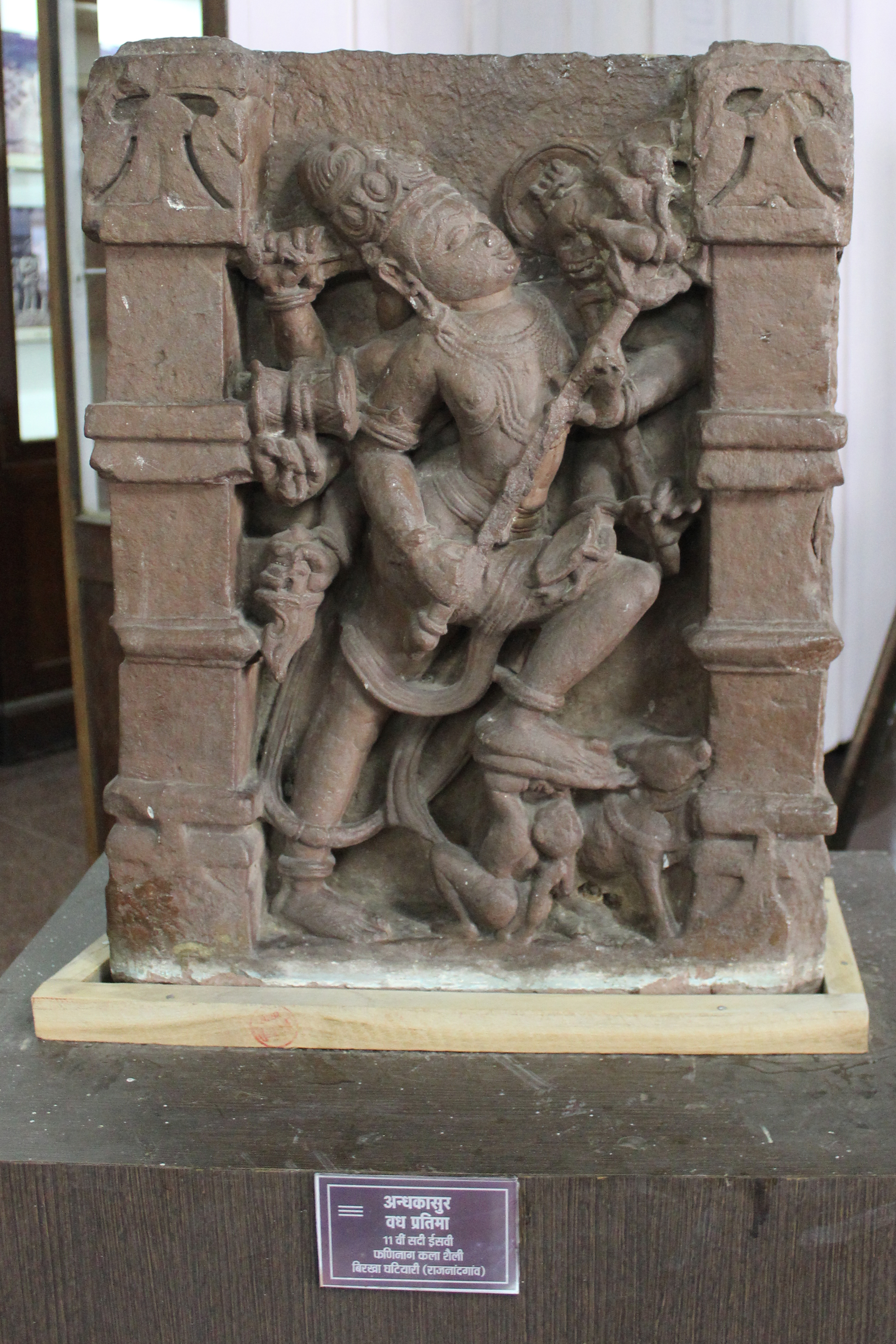
Andhakasur Vadh

In the Liṅga Purāṇa, Andhaka's story is related as a variation of accounts of Harvamsa and Kurma Purana. Andhaka was the son of Hiraṇyākṣa and was given immunity to death by Brahmā after he performed a severe penance. He traversed the three worlds and conquered the heavens. The Devas retreated to Mount Mandara, where the demon followed them. Shiva, on the request of the Devas, challenges Andhaka, destroys his army and impales him on his trident. However, the divine sight of Shiva burns away all of Andhaka's sins, prompting the latter to eulogizing him. Shiva was pleased with his devotion and forgave him, making him the chief of all his Gaṇas.

It is here that the reader is informed that Andhaka's son is Āḍi.

==== Alternate account ====
Another version of the tale states that Andhaka fought with the Gaṇas and Shiva's sons, but that the gods lost the battle. Shiva sends Vīrabhadra to battle it out with Andhaka, but every time Vīrabhadra kills Andhaka, another form arises from his blood that falls upon the earth. Parvati becomes furious and assumes the form of Kālī. She destroys each and every copy of Andhaka, except for the real one, who is saved by Shiva and given a new life.

== In the Rāmāyaṇa and Mahābhārata ==
In the Rāmāyaṇa, the story of Kālī killing Andhaka is briefly noted in Chapter 30 of the Araṇya Kāṇḍa, at the moment when Khara, the younger brother of Rāvaṇa is killed by Rāma. The scripture reads that Andhaka was killed by Shiva's third eye in the forest of the sage Śveta.

In the Mahābhārata, Andhaka is killed by Kālī, though not by his third eye as in the Rāmāyaṇa.

== See also ==
- Matrikas
- Jalandhara
