= 1993 in literature =

This article contains information about the literary events and publications of 1993.

== Events ==
- September 24 – Former president and writer Zviad Gamsakhurdia returns to Georgia to establish a government-in-exile in the city of Zugdidi.
- November 17 – Annie Proulx wins the National Book Award in the United States for her novel The Shipping News.
- unknown dates
  - Indrani Aikath Gyaltsen's novel Cranes' Morning appears in India, but proves to be plagiarized from Elizabeth Goudge's The Rosemary Tree (1956); its author will commit suicide in 1994.
  - Professor Stephen Hawking's A Brief History of Time becomes the longest-running book on The Sunday Times UK bestseller list.
  - Reality television contest Million's Poet (شاعر المليون) is launched in the United Arab Emirates.
  - Todur Zanet's translation of Jean Racine's Bajazet is produced by Moldova 1, a seminal moment in the development of Gagauz-language theatre.
  - The Guodian Chu Slips, including the oldest known version of Laozi's Tao Te Ching, a chapter from the Book of Rites, content from the Book of Documents and the previously lost Xing Zi Ming Chu, written on bamboo and dated before 300 BCE (later Warring States period), are found in a tomb near Guodian, Jingmen (Hubei province of China).

== New books ==
=== Fiction ===
- Stephen Ambrose – Band of Brothers
- Jeffrey Archer – Honour Among Thieves
- David Banks – Iceberg
- Iain Banks – Complicity
- Pat Barker – The Eye in the Door
- Greg Bear – Moving Mars
- Daniel Blythe – The Dimension Riders
- William Boyd – The Blue Afternoon
- Sandra Boynton – Barnyard Dance!
- Christopher Bulis – Shadowmind
- Anthony Burgess – A Dead Man in Deptford
- Ramsey Campbell – Alone with the Horrors: The Great Short Fiction of Ramsey Campbell 1961-1991
- Tom Clancy – Without Remorse
- Deborah Joy Corey – Losing Eddie
- Bernard Cornwell – Rebel
- Robert Crais – Free Fall
- Maurice G. Dantec – La Sirène rouge
- Peter Darvill-Evans – Deceit
- Hollace Davids and Paul Davids – Mission from Mount Yoda
- Lindsey Davis – Poseidon's Gold
- L. Sprague de Camp – Rivers of Time
- Stephen R. Donaldson – The Gap into Power: A Dark and Hungry God Arises
- Roddy Doyle – Paddy Clarke Ha Ha Ha
- Helen Dunmore – Zennor in Darkness
- Shusaku Endo (遠藤 周作) – Deep River (深い河)
- Steve Erickson – Arc d'X
- Jeffrey Eugenides – The Virgin Suicides
- Richard Paul Evans – The Christmas Box
- Sebastian Faulks – Birdsong
- Amanda Filipacchi – Nude Men
- Neil Gaiman
  - The Sandman: A Game of You (graphic novel; fifth in The Sandman series)
  - The Sandman: Fables & Reflections (graphic novel; sixth in The Sandman series)
- John Gardner – Never Send Flowers
- Ernest Gaines – A Lesson Before Dying
- William Gibson – Virtual Light
- John Grisham – The Client
- Hal (a Macintosh IIcx computer) and Scott French (programmer) – Just This Once
- Jesse Lee Kercheval – The Museum of Happiness
- Stephen King – Nightmares & Dreamscapes
- Nancy Kress – The Aliens of Earth
- John le Carré – The Night Manager
- Lois Lowry – The Giver
- Saken Omur – Before Dawn
- Robert Ludlum – The Scorpio Illusion
- Amin Maalouf – Le Rocher de Tanios
- David A. McIntee – White Darkness
- Andy McNab – Bravo Two Zero
- David Malouf – Remembering Babylon
- Gita Mehta – A River Sutra (short stories)
- Jim Mortimore
  - Blood Heat
  - (with Andy Lane) – Lucifer Rising
- Taslima Nasrin – Lajja
- Patrick O'Brian – Clarissa Oakes
- Kate Orman – The Left-Handed Hummingbird
- Tim Pears – In the Place of Fallen Leaves
- Neil Penswick – The Pit
- Terry Pratchett – Men at Arms
- E. Annie Proulx – The Shipping News
- Jean Raspail – Sept cavaliers
- Ishmael Reed – Japanese by Spring
- Anne Rice – Lasher
- Gareth Roberts – The Highest Science
- J. Jill Robinson – Lovely In Her Bones
- Nigel Robinson – Birthright
- W. G. Sebald – The Emigrants
- Will Self – My Idea of Fun
- Vikram Seth – A Suitable Boy
- Carol Shields - The Stone Diaries
- Ahdaf Soueif – In the Eye of the Sun
- Danielle Steel – Vanished
- Emil Tode (Tõnu Õnnepalu) – Piiririik (Border State)
- Jesús Torbado – El peregrino
- Sue Townsend – Adrian Mole: The Wilderness Years
- Scott Turow – Pleading Guilty
- Kathy Tyers – The Truce at Bakura
- Buket Uzuner – The Sound of Fishsteps (Balık İzlerinin Sesi)
- Andrew Vachss – Shella
- Mario Vargas Llosa – Death in the Andes (Lituma en los Andes)
- Ivan Vladislavic – The Folly
- Robert James Waller – Slow Waltz at Cedar Bend
- Irvine Welsh – Trainspotting
- Herman Wouk – The Hope
- Austin Wright – Tony and Susan
- Timothy Zahn – The Last Command
- Roger Zelazny – A Night in the Lonesome October

=== Children and young people ===
- Janet and Allan Ahlberg – It Was a Dark and Stormy Night
- Nelson Algren (posthumous) – He Swung and He Missed
- Chris Van Allsburg – The Sweetest Fig
- Malorie Blackman – Operation Gadgetman!
- Benedict Blathwayt - Stories from Firefly Island
- Susan Cooper – The Boggart
- Richard Dalby – Mistletoe & Mayhem: Horrific Tales for the Holidays
- Mem Fox – Time for Bed
- Cornelia Funke – Wild Chicks
- Johanna Hurwitz – New Shoes for Silvia
- Jim Murphy – Across America on an Emigrant Train
- Larry Niven (with Alicia Austin) – Bridging the Galaxies
- Rodman Philbrick – Freak the Mighty
- Allen Say – Grandfather's Journey
- Marjorie W. Sharmat – Nate the Great and the Pillowcase
- Francisco Calvo Serraller (with Willi Glasauer) – Grandes Maestros de la Pintura
- Theresa Tomlinson – The Forestwife (first in the Forestwife trilogy)
- Nancy Willard – A Starlit Somersault Downhill

=== Drama ===
- Parv Bancil – Ungrateful Dead
- April De Angelis – Playhouse Creatures
- David Hare – The Absence of War
- Tom Stoppard – Arcadia

=== Poetry ===
- Leonard Cohen – Stranger Music
- Paul Durcan – A Snail in My Prime: New and Selected Poems
- Dejan Stojanović – Krugovanje: 1978–1987 (Circling: 1978–1987)

=== Non-fiction ===
- Martin Amis – Visiting Mrs Nabokov: And Other Excursions
- Karen Armstrong – A History of God
- Khursheed Kamal Aziz – The Murder of History in Pakistan: A critique of history textbooks used in Pakistan
- Malcolm Bradbury – The Modern British Novel
- Richard Dawkins – Viruses of the Mind
- Shobha De and Khushwant Singh – Uncertain Liaisons
- Alain Erlande-Brandenburg – Cathedrals and Castles: Building in the Middle Ages
- Alexandre Farnoux – Cnossos : L'archéologie d'un rêve
- Zlata Filipović – Zlata's Diary
- Bob Flowerdew – The Organic Gardener
- Tamala Krishna Goswami – Happiness is a Science – Aditi's Vow
- Linda Holmen, Mary Santella-Johnson and Bill Watterson – Teaching with Calvin and Hobbes
- Laënnec Hurbon – Voodoo: Truth and Fantasy
- Linda Johns – Sharing a Robin's Life
- Susanna Kaysen – Girl, Interrupted
- Leon M. Lederman and Dick Teresi – The God Particle
- James Lees-Milne – People and Places: Country House Donors and the National Trust
- Michel Maffesoli – The Contemplation of the World
- Jean Marigny – Vampires: The World of the Undead
- Scott McCloud – Understanding Comics
- Ram Swarup – Hindu View of Christianity and Islam
- Miranda Seymour – Ottoline Morrell: Life on the Grand Scale
- Howard Stern – Private Parts
- Walter Stewart – Too Big to Fail
- Margaret Thatcher – The Downing Street Years
- Gordon S. Wood – The Radicalism of the American Revolution

== Births ==
- July 3 - Hayeon Lim, South Korean author
- July 5 - Leah Johnson, American author
- August 1 - Tomi Adeyemi, Nigerian–American novelist
- August 26 - Nancy Yi Fan, Chinese American author
- December 22 - Leema Dhar, Indian poet and novelist
- unknown date - Idza Luhumyo, Kenyan short story writer

== Deaths ==
- January 6 – Ștefan Baciu, Romanian and Brazilian poet, novelist and literary promoter (born 1918)
- January 18 – Eleanor Hibbert (Jean Plaidy, etc.), English historical novelist (born 1906)
- January 22 – Kōbō Abe (安部 公房), Japanese novelist and playwright (born 1924)
- January 29 – Gustav Hasford, American marine, novelist, journalist, poet and book thief (born 1947)
- January 30 – Dorothy Miles, Welsh poet (born 1931)
- February 5 – William Pène du Bois, American author and illustrator (born 1916)
- March 1 – Ronald McCuaig, Australian poet, journalist, and children's author (born 1908)
- March 9 – C. Northcote Parkinson, English naval historian and critic of business methods (born 1909)
- March 10 – Dan Simonescu, Romanian literary historian and bibliographer (born 1902)
- March 13 – Claire Huchet Bishop, Swiss children's author (born 1898)
- March 16 – Natália Correia, Portuguese writer, poet and social activist (b. 1923)
- March 22 – Samiha Ayverdi, Turkish writer and Sufi mystic (b. 1905)
- April 15
  - Leslie Charteris, Anglo-American thriller writer (born 1907)
  - Robert Westall, English novelist and children's writer (born 1929)
- April 23 – Bertus Aafjes, Dutch poet (born 1914)
- May 6 – Dorothy B. Hughes, American crime writer and critic (born 1904)
- June 19 – Sir William Golding, English novelist and poet (born 1911)
- July 10 – Ruth Krauss, American children's author and poet (born 1901)
- August 28 – E. P. Thompson, English political historian (born 1924)
- September – Leonte Răutu, Bessarabian-born Romanian propagandist and censor (born 1910)
- September 7 – Eugen Barbu, Romanian novelist, playwright and journalist (born 1924)
- September 16 – Oodgeroo Noonuccal, aboriginal Australian poet (born 1920)
- November 1 – Maeve Brennan, Irish short story writer and journalist (born 1917)
- November 22 – Anthony Burgess, English novelist (born 1917)
- December 4 – Margaret Landon, American historical novelist (born 1903)
- December 28 – William L. Shirer, American journalist and historian (born 1904)
- December 31 – Zviad Gamsakhurdia, Georgian dissident, scientist and writer (possible suicide, born 1913)
- Unknown date – Parijat (Bishnu Kumari Waiba), Nepalese novelist and poet (born 1937)

== Awards ==
- Nobel Prize for Literature: Toni Morrison
- Camões Prize: Rachel de Queiroz

=== Australia ===
- The Australian/Vogel Literary Award: Helen Demidenko, The Hand That Signed the Paper
- C. J. Dennis Prize for Poetry: Les Murray, Translations from the Natural World
- Kenneth Slessor Prize for Poetry: Les Murray, Translations from the Natural World
- Mary Gilmore Prize: Jill Jones, The Mask and Jagged Star
- Miles Franklin Award: Alex Miller, The Ancestor Game

=== Canada ===
- See 1993 Governor General's Awards for a complete list
- Edna Staebler Award for Creative Non-Fiction: Liza Potvin (co-winner), White Lies (for my mother)
- Edna Staebler Award for Creative Non-Fiction: Elizabeth Hay (co-winner), The Only Snow in Havana

=== France ===
- Prix Goncourt: Amin Maalouf, Le Rocher de Tanios
- Prix Décembre: René de Obaldia. Exobiographie
- Prix Médicis French: Emmanuèle Bernheim, Sa femme
- Prix Médicis International: Paul Auster, Leviathan

=== United Kingdom ===
- Booker Prize: Roddy Doyle, Paddy Clarke Ha Ha Ha
- Carnegie Medal for children's literature: Robert Swindells, Stone Cold
- James Tait Black Memorial Prize for fiction: Caryl Phillips, Crossing the River
- James Tait Black Memorial Prize for biography: Richard Holmes, Dr Johnson and Mr Savage
- Cholmondeley Award: Patricia Beer, George Mackay Brown, P. J. Kavanagh, Michael Longley
- Whitbread Book Award: Joan Brady, Theory of War
- The Sunday Express Book of the Year: William Boyd, The Blue Afternoon

=== United States ===
- Agnes Lynch Starrett Poetry Prize: Natasha Saj, Red Under the Skin
- Aiken Taylor Award for Modern American Poetry: George Starbuck
- American Academy of Arts and Letters gold Medal for Belles Lettres, Elizabeth Hardwick
- Bernard F. Connors Prize for Poetry: Stephen Yenser, "Blue Guide"
- Compton Crook Award: Holly Lisle, Fire in the Mist
- Frost Medal: William Stafford
- National Book Award for Fiction: E. Annie Proulx, The Shipping News
- National Book Critics Circle Award: Alan Lomax, The Land Where the Blues Began
- Nebula Award: Kim Stanley Robinson, Red Mars
- Newbery Medal for children's literature: Cynthia Rylant, Missing May
- PEN/Faulkner Award for Fiction: E. Annie Proulx, Postcards
- Pulitzer Prize for Drama: Tony Kushner, Angels in America: Millennium Approaches
- Pulitzer Prize for Fiction: Robert Olen Butler, A Good Scent from a Strange Mountain
- Pulitzer Prize for Poetry: Louise Gluck, The Wild Iris
- Whiting Awards:

Fiction: Jeffrey Eugenides, Dagoberto Gilb, Sigrid Nunez, Janet Peery, Lisa Shea
Plays: Kevin Kling
Poetry: Mark Levine, Nathaniel Mackey (poetry/fiction), Dionisio D. Martinez, Kathleen Peirce

- Writers Guild of America Awards 1993 (March 13): Best Adapted Screenplay: Steven Zaillian, Schindler's List

=== Elsewhere ===
- Friedenspreis des Deutschen Buchhandels: Friedrich Schorlemmer
- Premio Nadal: Rafael Argullol Murgadas, La razón del mal
