= Jean Clair =

French journalist (born 1940)

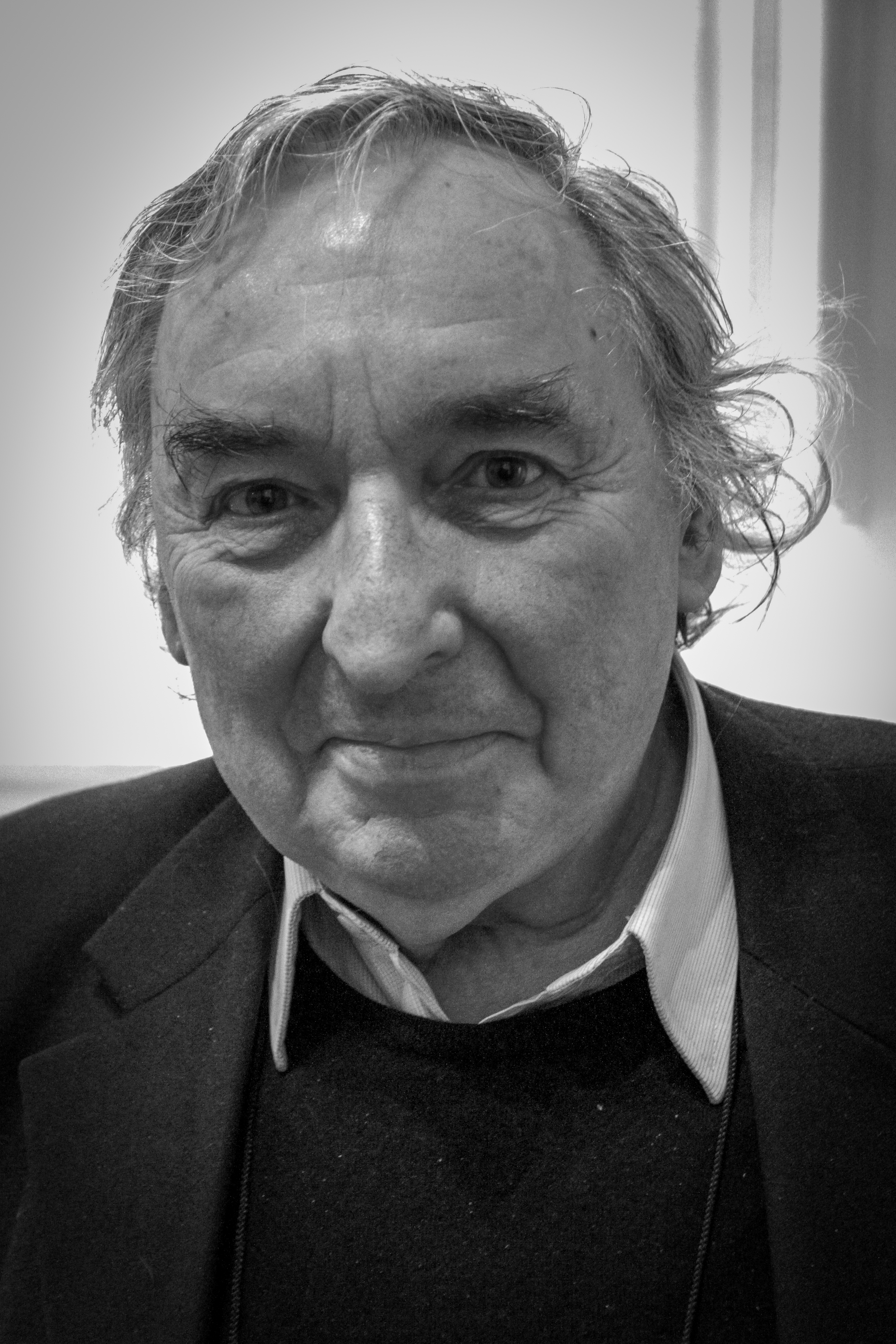
- Jean Clair in 2013
- Born: Gérard Régnier; 20 October 1940 (age 85); Paris, France
- Education: Lycée Carnot; University of Paris
- Occupation: Writer • Novelist • Art historian
- Known for: Member of the Académie Française

Jean Clair (French pronunciation: [ʒɑ̃ klɛʁ]) is the pen name of Gérard Régnier (French pronunciation: [ʒeʁaʁ ʁeɲe]; born 20 October 1940). Clair is an essayist, a polemicist, an art historian, an art conservator, and a member of the Académie Française since May 2008. He was, for many years, the director of the Picasso Museum in Paris. Among the milestones of his long and productive career is a comprehensive catalog of the works of Balthus. He was also the director of the Venice Biennale in 1995.

== Biography ==
His father was a farmer with socialist ideas and his mother a devout Catholic. Jean Clair was born in the sixth arrondissement of Paris. He was a student at two secondary schools, the lycée Jacques-Decour and the lycée Carnot, before embarking on a course of post-Baccalauréat preparation, the so-called khâgne, at the prestigious lycée Henri-IV in Paris. Then he pursued a doctorate degree in literature and sciences at the Sorbonne, specialising in philosophy and the history of art. There he was a student of the art historian, André Chastel, and the philosopher, Jean Grenier. Later, he secured a doctorate in art at the Fogg Art Museum at Harvard University with scholarship support from the financier Arthur Sachs. During his studies he spent a year in the Netherlands and another year in Belgium. During the Algerian war, for a time, he was involved with the Union of Communist Students (Union des étudiants communistes de France - UEC).

Jean Clair entered the literary world and became the art editor of The "La Nouvelle Revue française" (New French Review), led by the well-known Marcel Arland, Georges and Jacques Reda Lambrichs. His start as a writer was marked by the publication in this magazine of a journal-novel under the pseudonym Clair at 22, in 1962. In this journal he expresses the nostalgia of his childhood and adolescence on a farm, in the countryside, which his parents left taking him with them to live in the city.

For his first job, he was assigned to the Orangerie Museum, but found it "so dusty, so bourgeois". Passing the second competitive examination for the position of curator of the Museums of France in 1966 at the age of 26, he was assistant curator until 1969, then curator at the National Museum of Modern Art for ten years; and then curator of the section ("cabinet") of graphic art at the Centre Pompidou between 1980 and 1989. He was appointed General National (French) Heritage "conservateur" (preserver) in 1989. He was the Director of the Picasso Museum, Paris, France until 2005. He also curated many national exhibitions such as "Duchamp" (1977), "Les Réalismes"/The various form of realism (1980), "Vienne/Vienna" (1986), " L'âme au corps"/The soul and the body (1993 ), Zoran Music (1995),"Balthus ","Szafran"," Mélancolie/Melancholy "(2005)," Crime et Châtiment"/Crime and Punishment (2010) and directed the Venice Biennale for its Centennial in 1995.

Jean Clair was the editor of "Les Chroniques de l'art vivant" (The Chronicles of Living Art) which he directed from 1969 to 1975. This magazine was founded by Aimé Maeght and saw the light of day before Art Press (1972). Jean Clair wrote in this magazine mainly about the new generation of artists such as Buren, Boltanski, Sarkis, Le Gac and Viallat. This magazine was a privileged place of observation to reflect on the changes that shook the world of art in all areas, the visual arts, as well as in music, film and dance. In several works, he denounced the present turn of contemporary art that has broken with the European artistic tradition.

Jean Clair was a professor of art history at the École du Louvre between 1977 and 1980, and founded the "Cahiers du musée d'Art moderne" a series of publications of the Museum of Modern Art in Paris, France, that ran from 1978 to 1986. He regularly participates in debates on contemporary art and the dissemination of art.

== Awards and distinctions ==
=== Distinctions ===
Jean Clair was elected to the Académie française (French Academy) to the seat formerly occupied by Bertrand Poirot-Delpech (seat 39) on May 22, 2008. He was received "under the Dome" (sous la Coupole) of the French Academy by Marc Fumaroli.

He has been a member of the scholarly society Académie du Morvan (Academy of Morvan, founded in 1967) since 2010.

=== Awards ===
1988: Fritz Winter Foundation Winner 1992: Psyche Award 1993: Médaille de l'histoire de l'art de l'Académie d'architecture (Medal of the Art History of the Academy of Architecture) 2007: Fondation Cino del Duca Winner

== Speeches and scholarly work ==
Jean Clair's Acceptance speech when entering the French Academy, Juin 18, 2009 (in French)

Speech made by Jean Clair in the opening session the Five Academies, October 23, 2012 - Cinq Académies:

== Books/Studies/Museum Catalogs ==
Jean Clair published numerous books. Most are in French. For a complete list see the Jean Clair in the French Wikipedia.

=== Some books translated in English ===
Balthus: Catalogue Raisonné of the Complete Works by Virginie Monnier and Jean Clair, Publisher: Metropolitan Museum of Art (October 29, 2013); • ISBN 0300197012; ISBN 978-0300197013

The 1930s: The Making of the New Man, Paperback, Publisher: National Gallery of Canada / ABC Art Books Canada; 1st edition (June 5, 2008) ISBN 0888848536; ISBN 978-0888848536 (Contributors include: Eric Michaud, author of The Cult of Art in Nazi Germany (Stanford University Press); Sander L. Gilman, author of Freud, Race and Gender (Princeton University Press); Didier Ottinger of the Centre Pompidou, Paris; and Jean Clair, former director of the Musée Picasso, Paris)

Cosmos: From Romanticism to Avant-Garde, 1801-2001 by Jean Clair, Jean-Louis Cohen, Didier Ottinger

Henri Cartier-Bresson: Europeans by Jean Clair, Anthony Rudolf (Translator) Publisher: Thames & Hudson Ltd Date published: 3/1/1999 ISBN 9780500281222 ISBN 050028122X

Paul Delvaux by Jean Clair, Skira - Berenice, 1998 Publisher: Artificio Skira, Milano, 1998 ISBN 9788881184354 ISBN 8881184354

Delvaux and the Antiquity by Sophie Basch (Contributor), Jean Clair (Contributor), Michel Draguet (Contributor), Alexandre Farnoux (Contributor), Philippe Jockey (Contributor) Publisher: EXHIBITIONS INT'L (March 26, 2010) ISBN 9085865417 ISBN 978-9085865414

The 1920s : age of the metropolis. by Jean Clair, Montreal Museum of Fine Arts Publisher: The Montreal Museum of Fine Arts, Montreal Date published: 1991 ISBN 9782891921398 ISBN 2891921399 (about exhibition from June 20-November 10, 1991)

Venice Biennale: Identity and Alterity-Figures of the Body 1895/1995 by Clair, Jean. Publisher: La Biennale di Venezia, 1995. ISBN 9788820803902, ISBN 8820803909

Cosmos: From Goya to De Chirico, From Friedrich to Kiefer: Art in Pursuit of the Infinite by Clair, Jean; Publisher: Bompiani, 2000. ISBN 9788845244988, ISBN 8845244989

Cosmos: From Romanticism to the Avant-Garde by Clair, Jean; Publisher: Prestel, 1999 ISBN 9782891922319, ISBN 289192231X

=== Important scholarly art studies in French ===
- Le temps des avant-gardes, Chroniques d’art 1963-1978, Éditions de la Différence, 22 novembre 2012.
- Journal atrabilaire Gallimard - Folio 2008. ISBN 978-2-07-034934-0
- Malaise dans les musées Flammarion - Café Voltaire 2007. ISBN 978-2-08-120614-4
- Le Voyageur égoïste Payot - petite bibliothèque / voyageurs 1999. ISBN 2-228-89228-9
- Balthus, Flammarion 2001. ISBN 2-0801-0657-0

== Some studies for Exhibitions ==
Retrospective Henri Cartier-Bresson: the Man, the Image & the World. Henri Cartier-Bresson (1908 – 2004) | Le Couperet, V. The Decisive Moment(1952)

Point & shoot: photography, a child's play? Life & Work; Le Couperet HCB Frederik Neirynck 2004 – 2014
