= Mats Berggren =

Swedish writer

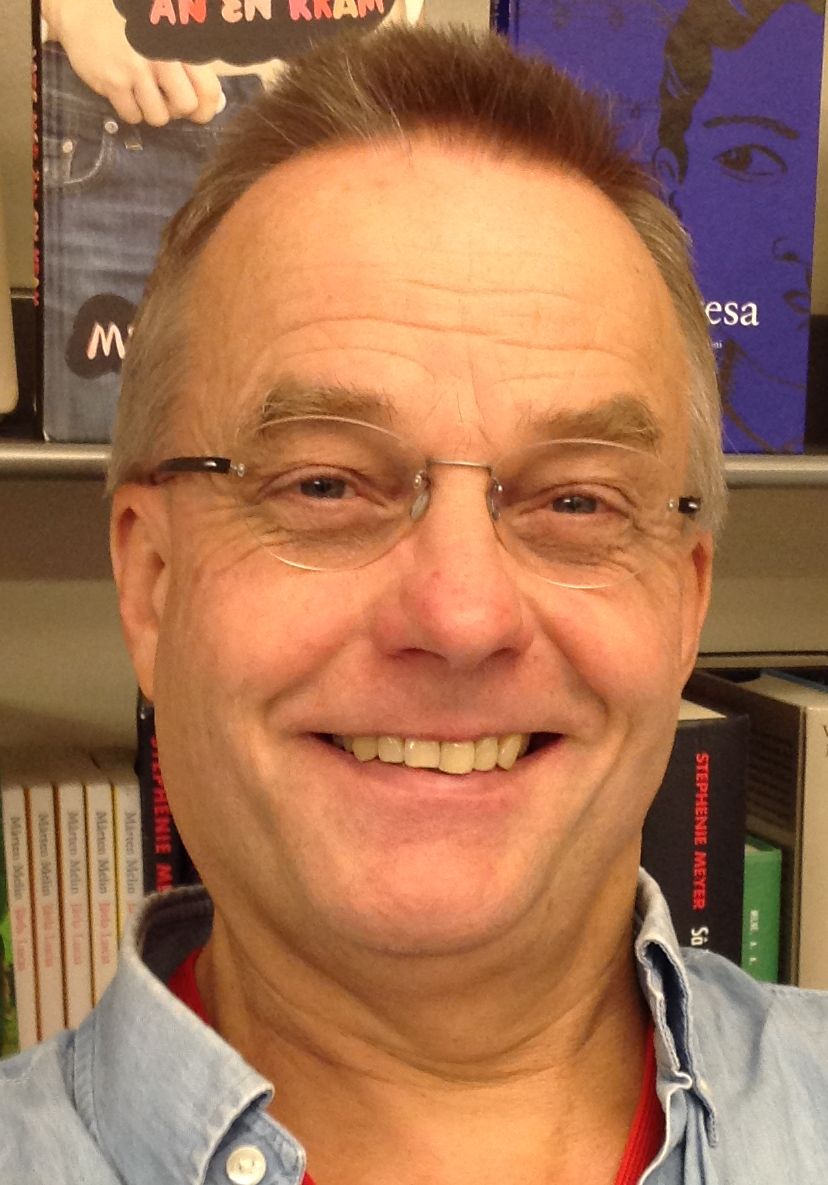
Mats Berggren in 2016.

Mats Berggren (born 1957, in Södertälje) is a Swedish writer. He specializes in children's and young adult literature.

He has been a jury member of the Astrid Lindgren Memorial Award.

== Biography ==
Mats Berggren was born and raised in Södertälje where he lived until 1997. He then studied cultural studies at Stockholm University from 1985 to 1987 and has made a living as a writer since his debut with Orent ackord. Mats Berggren has mainly written books for young people but also novels for adults. He has been a member of the Swedish Academy of Children's Books and a member of the jury for the Literature Prize in Memory of Astrid Lindgren.

== Selected works ==
- 1987 – Orent ackord
- 1989 – När blodrosen slår ut
- 1991 – Kalsonger med gröna älgar
- 1993 – Bilder från ett osynligt Sverige (photographs by Lars Lind)
- 1993 – Varken varken eller eller
- 1994 – Välfärdslandet?: 18 röster från Sverige i dag (editor)
- 1995 – Trosor med röda rosor
- 1999 – Blåögd
- 2000 – Behå med vita spetsar
- 2001 – Sent ute (with Bawer Coskun)
- 2002 – Det finns inga skridskor i öknen
- 2004 – Svennehora (with Dea Berisha)
- 2006 – En enda kväll
- 2008 – Sista berättelsen om oss
- 2011 – Språkresan
- 2013 – Jag ljuger bara på fredagar
- 2014 – Onsdag kväll strax för sju
- 2015 – Generation 55+
- 2017 – Din syster måste dö
