= Sonny Mehta =

Indian-born British and American publisher (1942–2019)

- Born: Ajai Singh Mehta; 9 November 1942; New Delhi, British India
- Died: 30 December 2019 (aged 77); New York City, U.S.
- Education: The Lawrence School, Sanawar; Sevenoaks School, Kent; St Catharine's College; University of Cambridge
- Occupations: Book editor and publishing executive
- Spouse: Gita Mehta (m. 1965–2019)
- Children: 1
- Relatives: Biju Patnaik (father-in-law); Naveen Patnaik (brother-in-law)

Ajai Singh "Sonny" Mehta (9 November 1942 – 30 December 2019) was a British and American editor. Mehta was the editor-in-chief of Alfred A. Knopf and chairman of the Knopf Doubleday Publishing Group.

== Early life and education ==
Born in New Delhi on 9 November 1942, Sonny Mehta was the son of Amrik Singh Mehta, an officer in the Royal Indian Air Force and one of the first four diplomats of Independent India, and Satinder (Duggal) Singh. As a child, Mehta lived all over the world, including Prague, New York City, Nepal and Geneva. He was educated at the Lawrence School, Sanawar, the International School of Geneva and Sevenoaks School in Kent, where he won an open scholarship to St Catharine's College, Cambridge. At Cambridge University he read History and English Literature and worked on the magazine Granta.

== Career ==
Mehta began his publishing career in 1965 in London at Rupert Hart-Davis, then joined Granada Publishing in 1966 to co-found a new publishing house, Paladin, where he commissioned Germaine Greer's influential The Female Eunuch and brought American writers to the UK public with books including Hunter Thompson's Fear and Loathing in Las Vegas. Moving to Pan Books in 1972, Mehta added to its list of best-selling authors by publishing writers who went on to become household names, including Jackie Collins and Douglas Adams, and launched there the Picador imprint, publishing Booker Prize winners Ian McEwan, Salman Rushdie, Edmund White, Julian Barnes and Graham Swift, as well as Ryszard Kapuściński, Angela Carter, Bret Easton Ellis and Michael Herr, leading The Times to describe his tenure as producing "the Picador Generation".

In 1987, Mehta moved from London to New York City to head the American literary imprint Alfred A. Knopf as president and editor-in-chief. Mehta was chosen by Robert Gottlieb, who was leaving Knopf to edit The New Yorker. On Mehta's watch, Knopf published six Nobel literature laureates (Kazuo Ishiguro, Alice Munro, Orhan Pamuk, Imre Kertész, V. S. Naipaul, and Toni Morrison), numerous Pulitzer Prize, Booker Prize and National Book Award winners, and continued the tradition of publishing important French, German, Italian, Spanish, Scandinavian, South American, African, and Asian writers as well as work by such contemporary leaders as U.S. presidents George H. W. Bush and Bill Clinton, UK Prime Ministers Margaret Thatcher and Tony Blair, and Pope John Paul II. Mehta's tenure at Knopf featured new translations of Tolstoy, Thomas Mann, Robert Musil, and Albert Camus; bestsellers included Ken Burns's history of the Civil War, Michael Crichton's Jurassic Park, Stieg Larsson's Girl with the Dragon Tattoo trilogy, James Ellroy's crime fiction, and the Fifty Shades trilogy. Mehta recognized the importance of the new genre of graphic novels, publishing prize-winning titles Maus and Persepolis.

Although Alfred A. Knopf has been publishing books for more than one hundred years, Mehta was only the third editor-in-chief. He told Vanity Fair in 2015: "On a good day, I am still convinced I have the best job in the world."

The addition of Pantheon, Vintage Books, Schocken and Everyman's Library to the Knopf Publishing Group, and later the Doubleday group in 2009, all working under Mehta's direction, led to him being described as the world's most important anglophone publisher.

On Alfred A. Knopf surviving threats to the publishing business and the tumult of acquisitions and mergers, Mehta said: "We're part of something that is very large but we concentrate on our way of doing things. It may be illusory to insulate oneself from it all, but we try."

== Awards and recognition ==
Mehta won Lifetime Achievement Awards for publishing in India, the UK, and the United States. He was awarded an honorary doctorate by Bard College in 2008. He was in the Hall of Fame in Vanity Fair's Best-Dressed Men in the World list.

He was named 2015 Person of the Year by Publishers Weekly.

In 2018, the Center for Fiction awarded Mehta the Maxwell E. Perkins Award, honouring the lifetime work of an editor, publisher or agent "who over the course of his or her career has discovered, nurtured and championed writers of fiction in the United States."

== Personal life ==
In 1965, he married Gita Patnaik, daughter of Biju Patnaik and sister of Naveen Patnaik. She later became a documentary film-maker and writer under her married name. They have one son, Aditya Singh Mehta.

== Death ==
Mehta died on 30 December 2019 at the age of 77, in Manhattan, New York, of complications from pneumonia. To celebrate his life, memorial events were held in New York and in London. John Grisham dedicated his 2020 novel A Time for Mercy to the memory of Mehta, as did British author Robert Harris with his 2020 novel V2.
