= Karma Cola =

1979 book by Gita Mehta

- First edition
- Author: Gita Mehta
- Language: English
- Subject: India in the 1960s
- Genre: nonfiction journalism
- Publisher: Simon & Schuster
- Publication date: 1979
- Publication place: India
- Pages: 210
- OCLC: 8660454
- Dewey Decimal: 954.04
- LC Class: DS414

Karma Cola is a non-fiction book about India written by Gita Mehta originally published in 1979 by Simon & Schuster.

== Subject matter ==
The story begins in the late 1960s, when hundreds of thousands of Westerners descended upon India, disciples of a cultural revolution that proclaimed that the magic and mystery missing from their lives was to be found in the East. An Indian writer who has also lived in England and the United States, Gita Mehta observed the spectacle of European and American "pilgrims" interacting with their hosts, and recorded her observations in Karma Cola. It describes the traditions of an ancient and long-lived society being turned into commodities and sold to those who do not understand them.

== Editions ==
Reprints include:

Year	Publisher	Pages	ISBN
1980	Jonathan Cape	201	9780224017749
1981	Collins	210	9780006360926
1990	Minerva	210	9780749390693
1991	Fawcette Columbine	193	9780449906040
1993	Penguin Books	193	9780140236835
1994	Vintage Books	208	9780679754336
2010	Random House		9781409042648

== Translations ==
- Czech language: Karma-Cola : výprodej tajemného Orientu, publishing house Argo, Prague, 1999, translation Ivana Husáková
