= Carol Publishing Group =

Defunct American publishing company

- Predecessor: Lyle Stuart, Inc.
- Founded: January 9, 1989; 37 years ago
- Founder: Steven Schragis
- Defunct: March 28, 2000; 26 years ago
- Successor: Kensington Books
- Country of origin: United States
- Headquarters location: 120 Enterprise Avenue, Secaucus, New Jersey, US
- Imprints: Birch Lane Press; Citadel Press; University Books

Carol Publishing Group was an American publishing company. Lyle Stuart founded its predecessor around 1955. Steven Schragis bought Stuart's publishing business in early 1989, renaming it to Carol Publishing. Carol was a going concern from its 1989 sale to its bankruptcy in 2000; Kensington Books bought its assets after Carol liquidated. It was mainly known for salacious titles about celebrities.

== Early history and sale (1955–1989) ==
The organization that was to become Carol Publishing Group began around 1955, when Lyle Stuart established Lyle Stuart, Inc., a publishing outfit later based in Secaucus, New Jersey, known for "scandalous" titles including biographies of celebrities. Stuart sold his eponymous company, and its imprints Citadel Press and University Books, to Carol Management for US$12 million, effective January 9, 1989. The deal was orchestrated by Steven Schragis, then the executive vice president of Carol Management. After the sale closed, Schragis took over control of the new entity, known initially as Carol Communications.

Carol Management was a family business and Schragis was a member of the family that controlled it. The name "Carol" was Schragis's mother's and his purchase from Lyle Stuart was financed with a loan from his parents, aunt, and Carol Management itself.

== Operations, litigation, and bankruptcy (1989–2000) ==
Carol's business model focused on marketing and publicity. An encyclopedia of publishing suggests that Schragis, in his role as Carol's head, "exemplified the 'hard-sell' accountant-publisher mentality of today taken to perhaps its furthest extreme". A 2001 profile of Schragis said Carol was known for its "lowbrow celebrity bios"; The Washington Post called Carol a publisher of "salacious star biographies".

Carol published several unauthorized biographies and distributed (but did not itself publish) a suicide manual called Final Exit by Derek Humphry, an advocate of the right to die. An imprint named after Lyle Stuart published books by Kahlil Gibran. Carol made a foray into artificial intelligence with the 1993 romance novel Just This Once, about three quarters of which was written by a computer.

In 1990, Carol won an appeal in the United States Court of Appeals for the Second Circuit that allowed it to publish A Piece of Blue Sky: Scientology, Dianetics and L. Ron Hubbard Exposed, a biography of L. Ron Hubbard, who founded the Church of Scientology. The book contained quotations from Hubbard's writings totaling about 3 percent of the biography.

Paramount Pictures sued Carol over The Joy of Trek: How to Enhance Your Relationship with a "Star Trek" Fan, which Paramount said infringed its copyright in Star Trek. Carol lost. It lost again in Castle Rock Entertainment, Inc. v. Carol Publishing Group Inc. (1998), where the Second Circuit, affirming the trial judgment by Sonia Sotomayor, found that Carol's Seinfeld Aptitude Test, a trivia book about Seinfeld, infringed Castle Rock Entertainment's copyright in the show. In the same time period, Carol was sued over books related to other television series, including Frasier, Cheers, and The X-Files.

As of 1998, Carol was headquartered at 120 Enterprise Avenue, Secaucus, New Jersey. Its booklist covered most commercial categories. Its Citadel imprint was the second-largest entertainment book publisher in the United States. Carol's editor-in-chief was Hillel Black.

Around April 1999, a sale of Carol to LPC Group, a book distributor, appeared imminent. As of that time, Carol published 100–125 new books each year and had a backlist of 1,300. The deal fell through. Carol filed for bankruptcy on November 15, 1999. Its assets were sold on March 28, 2000, to Kensington Books.
