= Cathedrals and Castles: Building in the Middle Ages =

1993 book by Alain Erlande-Brandenburg

- First French edition. Construction of the Tower of Babel. Rudolf von Ems, Weltchronik, Ms 2, theol. 4. Gesamthochschulbibliothek Kassel.
- Author: Alain Erlande-Brandenburg
- Original title: Quand les cathédrales étaient peintes
- Translator: Rosemary Stonehewer
- Language: French
- Series: Découvertes Gallimard●Architecture (FR); Abrams Discoveries (US); New Horizons (UK)
- Release number: 180th in collection
- Subject: Medieval architecture
- Genre: Nonfiction monograph
- Publisher: FR: Éditions Gallimard; US: Harry N. Abrams; UK: Thames & Hudson
- Publication date: 15 September 1993; 20 May 2009 (new ed.)
- Publication place: France
- English publication date: 1995
- Media type: Print (paperback & hardcover)
- Pages: 176 pp.
- ISBN: 978-2-07-053234-6 (first edition)
- Preceded by: Le Corbusier : l'architecture pour émouvoir
- Followed by: Rabelais : Rire est le propre de l'homme

Cathedrals and Castles: Building in the Middle Ages (UK title: The Cathedral Builders of the Middle Ages; French: Quand les cathédrales étaient peintes, lit. 'When the Cathedrals were Painted') is a 1993 illustrated monograph on medieval architecture, mostly church architecture, and its building technology. Written by French art historian Alain Erlande-Brandenburg, and published by Éditions Gallimard as the 180th volume in their "Découvertes" collection.

== Synopsis ==
From left: US and UK editions.

The book is strictly architectural in focus, Alain Erlande-Brandenburg makes no attempt to portray medieval society but examines the churches and castles such a society required. A span of seven centuries, starting with the early builders of medieval towns (8th–9th century), through the impact of Gregorian Reform upon the realm of architecture (10th century) to the Gothic period (11th–14th century). The Cistercian architecture is also highlighted in the book, and a description of those colourful stained-glass windows that complemented a play of colours inside the church building.

The main focus of the book is on the architect (a master mason) and the construction process, such as transport of materials, laying of foundations, erection of walls and vaulting. It also discusses the relationships between architects and patrons, the organization of craftsmen's guilds, the development of written contracts, the transition from wood to stone construction, the use of architectural drawings, et cetera.

The "Documents" section at the end of the book assembles a collection of excerpts from primary sources that touch on issues related to large-scale construction, such as William of Sens's rebuild of the choir of Canterbury Cathedral in the 12th century, or the architects of Milan Cathedral had to call in experts from France when they realized their ambition had outstripped their competence. The list of "Thirty-One Great Cathedrals" includes eleven English buildings, seven in France, three in Germany and Central Europe, five in Italy and five in Spain.

== Contents ==
Body text

- Opening: Design for the central part of the façade of Strasbourg Cathedral (details). Inv. no. 5. Drawing circa 1360–5 (pp. 1–9)
- Chapter I: "A New World" (pp. 13–35)
- Chapter II: "The Architect" (pp. 37–69)
- Chapter III: "Means of Expression" (pp. 71–87)
- Chapter IV: "On Site" (pp. 89–127)

Documents

1. The Architect (pp. 130–135)
2. The Building Site (pp. 136–139)
3. Materials (pp. 140–145)
4. Building Techniques (pp. 146–163)
5. Machines (pp. 164–165)
- Thirty-One Great Cathedrals (pp. 166–167)
- Further Reading (p. 168)
- List of Illustrations (pp. 169–172)
- Index (pp. 172–174)
- Acknowledgments/Photo Credits/Text Credits (p. 175)

== Reception ==
The French medievalist Jacques Le Goff called Quand les cathédrales étaient peintes "an excellent essay".

The French historian Jean-Pierre Poussou gave a positive review to the book saying that "this little work of synthesis is a remarkable success: excellently illustrated (with very relevant comments), it does not content itself with teaching us the essentials of what we need to know about our great Gothic churches; in fact, there is a very successful development on the art of building of the creators of the Middle Ages and on medieval urban construction. In this way, it will render the greatest services to the demographic historians interested in this period. It is one of the best, if not the best in the collection."

The Australian historian of religion Carole Cusack also gave a positive review in her article for Parergon: "This lavishly illustrated small volume is a delight. Much of its charm is due to the gorgeous colour plates but the text is also intelligent and informative. It is not a 'scholarly' work but it offers a general perspective on medieval architecture for the non-specialist reader. [...] An ideal present for anyone who has ever marvelled at medieval cathedrals."

== See also ==
- Building a Gothic cathedral
- Gothic cathedrals and churches
- Medieval archaeology
- Medieval studies
- Medieval parish churches of York
- Architecture of the medieval cathedrals of England
- Norman architecture
- Romanesque architecture
