= Paddy Clarke Ha Ha Ha =

1993 novel by Roddy Doyle

- Cover of hardcover edition
- Author: Roddy Doyle
- Language: English
- Genre: Novel
- Publisher: Secker & Warburg (UK); Viking Press (US)
- Publication date: 1993
- Publication place: Ireland
- Media type: Print
- ISBN: 0-436-20135-6
- OCLC: 29258939
- LC Class: PR6054.O95 P33 1993

Paddy Clarke Ha Ha Ha is a novel by Irish writer Roddy Doyle, first published in 1993 by Secker and Warburg. It won the Booker Prize that year. The story is about a ten-year-old boy living in Barrytown, North Dublin, and the events that happen within his age group, school and home in around 1968.

== Plot synopsis ==
Paddy Clarke Ha Ha Ha recounts (approximately) one year in the life of a Dublin ten-year-old, Patrick "Paddy" Clarke, especially his relationships with his younger brother, Sinbad (Francis) and his parents, schoolmates and teachers. It begins with him being a mischievous boy roaming around local Barrytown and ends with his father departing from the family, forcing the boy to take up adult responsibilities in his single-parent home.

== Structure and language ==
The novel, chronicling Paddy's internal journey towards maturity, is a bildungsroman, as it centres upon the main character's development. Paddy's growing up is painfully bitter. While the beginning of the book is filled with playful antics, the growing antagonism between his parents and the breaking up of their marriage are evident as the novel progresses. Paddy does not choose his "journey of enlightenment and maturity"; rather, he is robbed of it when his parents become estranged from one another.

The novel is not divided into chapters, but into numerous vignettes that do not follow any chronological order. Despite the absence of a clear-cut plot (introduction, complication, climax, dénouement) the reader is still able to sense the passage of time both in Paddy's own life and in the changes that come to Barrytown.

Doyle's language employs a register that gives the reader the vivid impression of listening to a ten-year-old Irish boy from the 1960s.

== Critical reaction ==
The Independent praised it as "one of the truest and funniest presentations of juvenile experience in any recent literature".

When it won the Booker Prize, the book was mocked by some people as an "easy", "populist" choice.
