= Alain Erlande-Brandenburg =

French art historian (1937–2020)

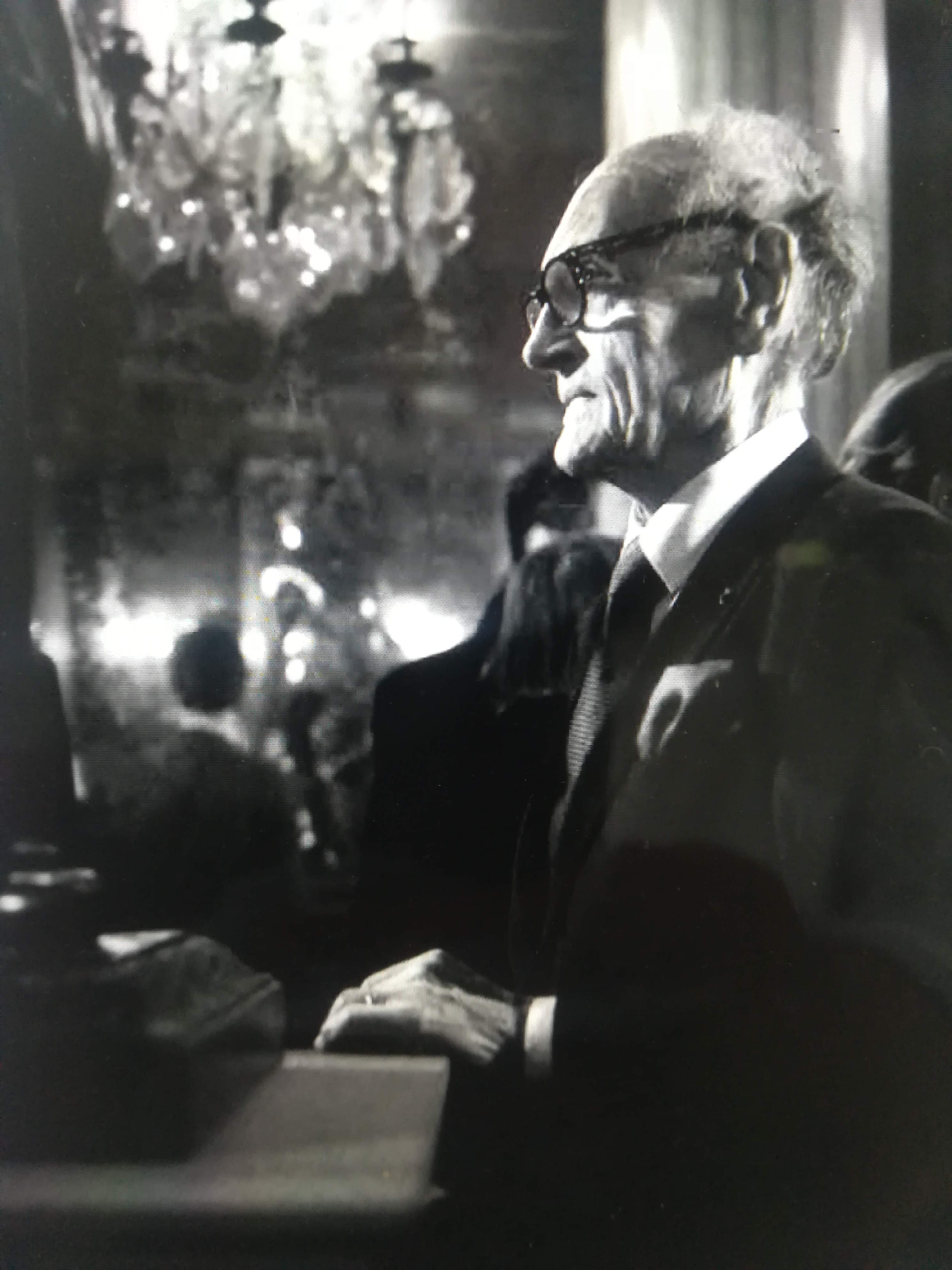
- Erlande-Brandenburg in 2017
- Born: 2 August 1937; Luxeuil, France
- Died: 6 June 2020 (aged 82)
- Education: École du Louvre
- Occupations: Art historian, museum curator
- Notable work: The Cathedral: The Social and Architectural Dynamics of Construction; Cathedrals and Castles: Building in the Middle Ages

Alain Erlande-Brandenburg (2 August 1937 in Luxeuil (Haute-Saône) – 6 June 2020, Paris) was a French art historian and honorary general curator for heritage, a specialist on Gothic and Romanesque art.

== Early life ==
Erlande-Brandenburg was son of the physician Gilbert Brandenburg and grandson of writer and poet Albert-Jacques Brandenburg. He attended school in Marseille at the lycée Saint-Charles et Thiers, then entered the Lycée Henri-IV to prepare the later study at the École Nationale des Chartes, from where he graduated as an archivist-palaeographer in 1964. He also studied at the École du Louvre, where he received his doctorate in 1971. Theses in 1964 at the École des Chartes (on French royal funerals and tombs) and in 1965 at the École du Louvre (on funerary statues) culminated in a dissertation at the École pratique des hautes études on the royal tombs at the Basilica of Saint-Denis, published in 1975.

== Career ==
He was chief curator of the Musée de Cluny (Musée national du Moyen Âge) since 1967, chief conservator and director of the National Museum of the Renaissance in Château d'Écouen from 1980 to 1987, of which he was a founder, and assistant to the director of the Musées de France from 1987 to 1991. He became director of the Musée de Cluny from 1991 to 1994 and director of Museum of the Renaissance from 1999 to 2005. He was also director of studies at the École pratique des hautes études (4th section) from 1974 to 2005. He taught as a professor of medieval architecture at the École de Chaillot and museology at the École du Louvre. From 1991 to 2000 he was professor of medieval archaeology and art history at the École des Chartes. From 1994 to 1998 he was director of the Archives nationales de France.

Brandenburg was Inspector General of French museums in 1988 and president of the Société française d'archéologie from 1985 to 1994. He has gained an international reputation for a number of important publications on the Gothic era, notably an enlightening work on the new conception of the history of art—La Cathédrale—published in 1989.

== Honours ==
- Officier de la Légion d'honneur (decree of 12 July 2002)
- Commandeur de l'ordre national du Mérite (decree of 14 May 1997)
- Commandeur de l'ordre des Arts et des Lettres
- Grand officier de l'ordre national du Lion (Senegal)
- Order of Duke Branimir (Croatia)

== Selected bibliography ==
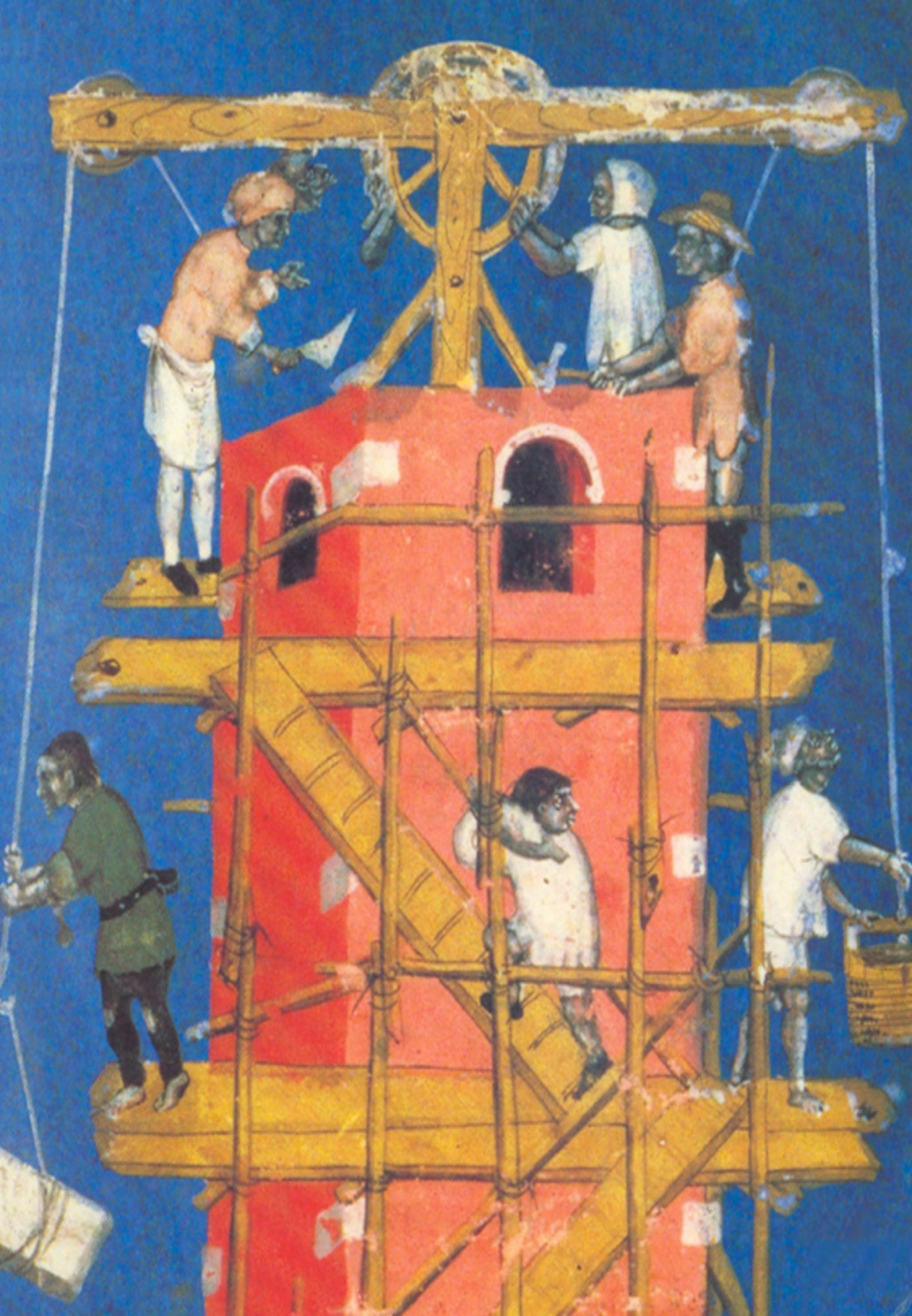
Construction of the Tower of Babel, featured on the cover of The Cathedral Builders of the Middle Ages.

- Cluny Museum, Ministère de la Culture et de la Communication, 1979.
- The Lady and the Unicorn, Éditions de la Réunion des Musées Nationaux, 1979.
- Les sculptures de Notre-Dame de Paris au Musée de Cluny. Editions de la Réunion des musées nationaux, 1982.
- L'art gothique. Éditions Citadelles & Mazenod, 1984, rev. 2004.
- L'Eglise abbatiale de Saint Denis (2 volumes). Éditions de la Tourelle, 1984.
- Le Monde gothique: La conquête de l'Europ(e (1260–1380), collection « L'Univers des Formes » (nº 34). Éditions Gallimard, 1987.
- La dame à la licorne, rev. ed. Éditions de la Réunion des musées nationaux, 1989.
- (With Bertrand Jestaz) Le château de Vincennes. Picard, 1989.
- La Cathédrale, collection « Histoire », Librairie Arthème Fayard, 1989.
  - The Cathedral: The Social and Architectural Dynamics of Construction, Cambridge University Press, 1994.
- Gothic Art, Harry N. Abrams, 1989.
- Notre-Dame de Paris. Nathan/CNMHS, 1991, rev. 1997.
- Quand les cathédrales étaient peintes, collection « Découvertes Gallimard » (nº 180), série Arts. Éditions Gallimard, 1993 (new edition in 2009).
  - UK edition – The Cathedral Builders of the Middle Ages, 'New Horizons' series. Thames & Hudson, 1995.
  - US edition – Cathedrals and Castles: Building in the Middle Ages, "Abrams Discoveries" series. Harry N. Abrams, 1995.
- De pierre, d'or et de feu: la création artistique au Moyen âge, IVe-XIIIe siècle. Fayard, 1999.
- Le sacre de l'artiste: la création au Moyen Âge XIVe-XVe siècle. Fayard, 2000.
- La Renaissance en Croatie. Exh. cat. Zagreb 2004. Réunion des musées nationaux, 2004.
- L'Art roman: Un défi européen, collection « Découvertes Gallimard » (nº 471), série Arts. Éditions Gallimard, 2005.
- La cathédrale de Reims: chef-d'oeuvre du gothique. Actes sud, 2007.
- Qu'est-ce qu'une église? « Hors série Connaissance ». Éditions Gallimard, 2010.
- (With Mathieu Lours) Cathédrales d'Europe. Citadelles & Mazenod, 2011.

== Literature ==
- Bos, Agnès (2006). Materiam superabat opus: Hommage à Alain Erlande-Brandenburg (in French). Paris: Réunion des musées nationaux. ISBN 9782711850235.
