= Gita Mehta =

American writer and filmmaker (1943–2023)

- Born: Gita Patnaik; 12 December 1943; Delhi, British India
- Died: 16 September 2023 (aged 79); Delhi, India
- Citizenship: United States
- Education: Girton College, Cambridge
- Occupations: Author; documentary filmmaker; journalist; director
- Spouse: Sonny Mehta (m. 1965; died 2019)
- Children: 1
- Parent: Biju Patnaik (father)
- Relatives: Naveen Patnaik (brother); Prem Patnaik (brother)
- Writing career
- Notable works: Karma Cola (1979); A River Sutra (1993); Eternal Ganesha (2006)

Gita Mehta (née Patnaik; 12 December 1943 – 16 September 2023) was an Indian-American writer and documentary filmmaker. As a journalist and documentary filmmaker she frequently covered war and conflict including covering the Bangladesh liberation war of 1971. As an author she published five books which were translated into 21 languages. Her works described aspects of life in India and were intended to interpret the country for a largely western audience.

== Early life ==
Mehta was born in Delhi on 12 December 1943 in a Karan family, to Gyan Patnaik and Biju Patnaik. Her father was an Indian independence activist and a chief minister in post-independence Odisha, then known as Orissa. Her younger brother, Naveen Patnaik, later also served as the chief minister of Odisha.

She went to a boarding school in Kashmir at age three, when her father was arrested as a part of the Indian independence movement. She also studied at Woodstock School, Tara Hall, before attending Sophia College in Mumbai. She completed her education in India and at Girton College, University of Cambridge in the United Kingdom.

== Career ==
Mehta produced and directed television documentaries for various British, European, and American networks. From 1970 to 1971 she was a television war correspondent for the US television network NBC. Her film compilation of the Bangladesh liberation war of 1971, Dateline Bangladesh, was shown in cinemas both in India and abroad.

Mehta's first book, Karma Cola (1979), took a shot at the western audience that believed that they could obtain instant spiritual enlightenment by going to India and finding a guru. In Raj (1989), a fictional work, Mehta focused on the story of a princess of two Indian princely states. Her second fictional work, A River Sutra (1993), was a collection of short stories that interpreted Indian life for a western audience. The book connected stories from Indian mythology to life in then present-day India and were connected by the Indian river Narmada. Her book Snakes and Ladders (1997) was a collection of essays about India and life in the country, written on the fiftieth anniversary of the country's independence.

Mehta's books have been translated into 21 languages and have been on bestseller lists in Europe, the US, and India. Her fiction and non-fiction works focus largely on India's culture and history, and their Western interpretation. Speaking about her work in an interview with Publishers Weekly, she said: "I wanted to make modern India accessible to Westerners and to a whole generation of Indians who have no idea what happened 25 years before they were born."

In 2019, Mehta was named as a recipient of India's fourth highest civilian award, the Padma Shri, which she declined, stating "the timing of the award might be misconstrued" referring to the then-upcoming general elections.

She was elected a Fellow of the Royal Society of Literature in 2021.

== Personal life ==
Mehta married Sonny Mehta, former head of the Alfred A. Knopf publishing house, in 1965. The couple had met while studying in Cambridge. The couple had a son, Aditya Singh Mehta. Her husband predeceased her in 2019. Mehta divided her time between New York City, London and New Delhi.

Mehta died at her house in Delhi on 16 September 2023, at the age of 79.

== Works ==
- Karma Cola. Simon & Schuster, 1979
- Raj, 1989 ISBN 978-0-671-43248-5
- A River Sutra (short stories), 1993 ISBN 978-0-09-951594-4
- Snakes and Ladders: Glimpses of Modern India, London: Secker & Warburg, 1997. ISBN 0-436-20417-7
- Eternal Ganesha: From Birth to Rebirth, Thames & Hudson, 2006
