= Leema Dhar =

Indian author

- लीमा धर
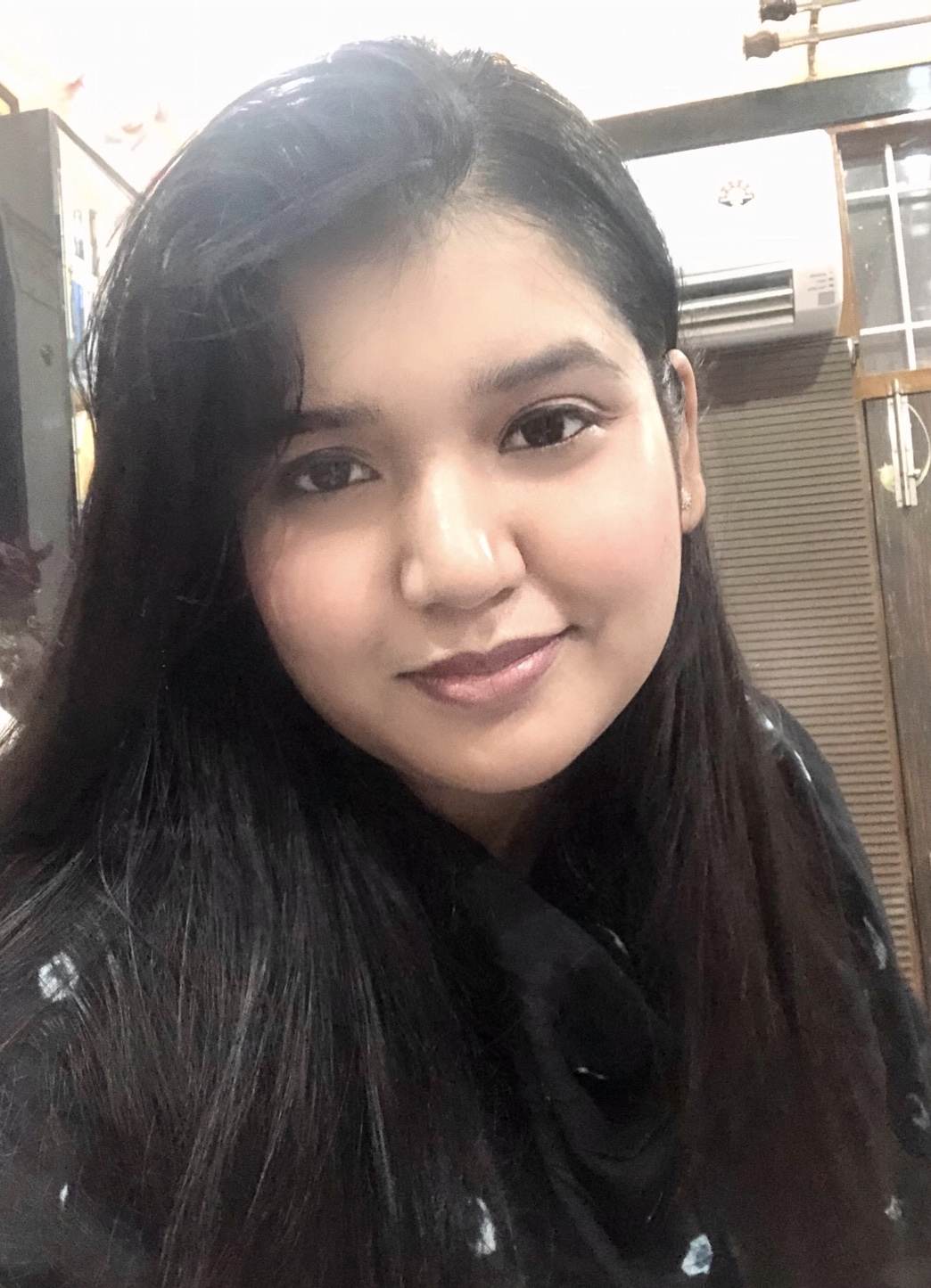
- Leema Dhar (2020)
- Born: 22 December 1993 (age 32); Allahabad, Uttar Pradesh, India
- Citizenship: Indian
- Education: University of Allahabad
- Occupation: Novelist
- Writing career
- Language: English (novels and columns), Hindi (poems and columns)
- Genres: Fiction, romance, thriller
- Website: www.writerleema.com

Signature
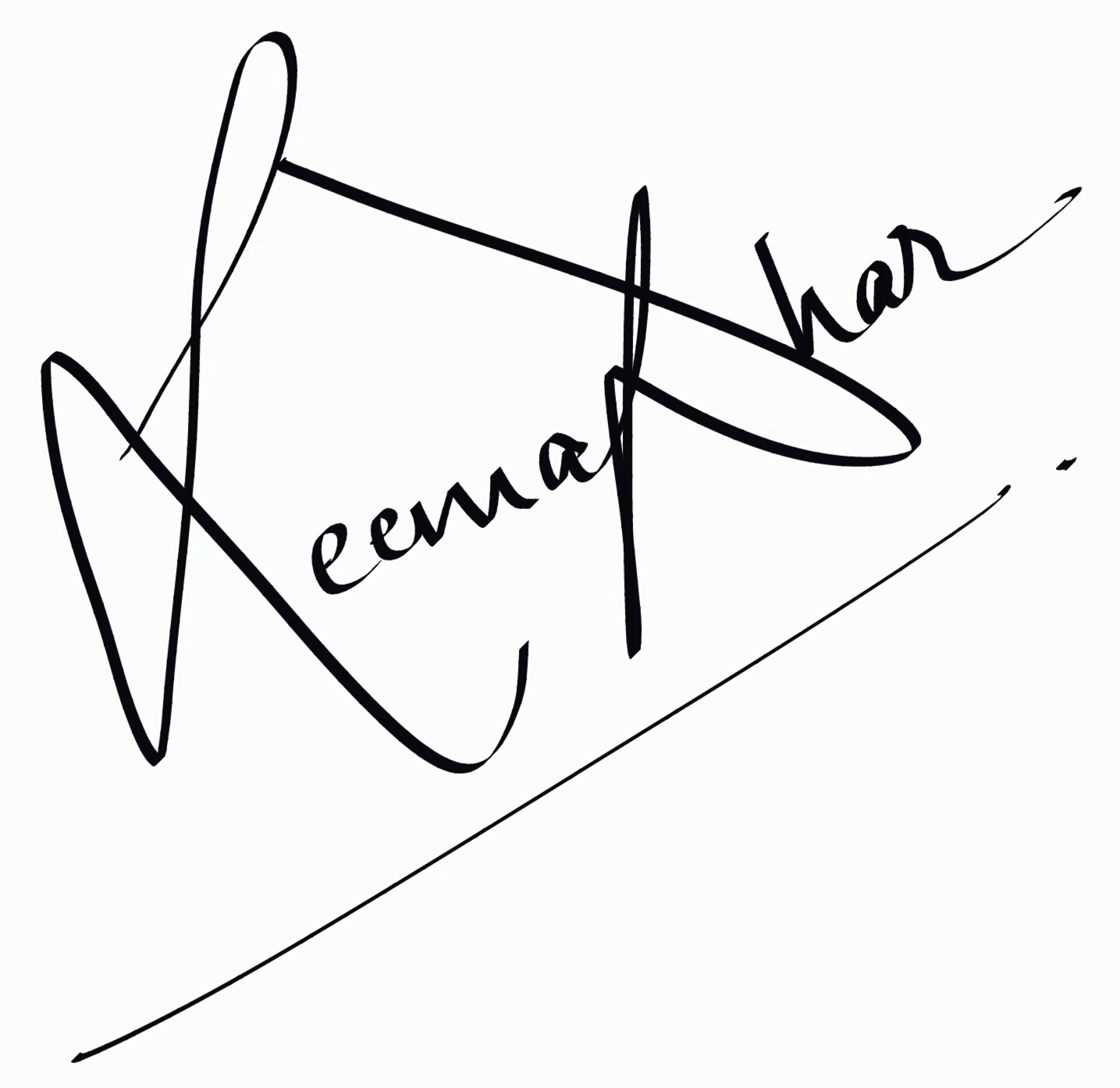

Leema Dhar (Bengali লীমা ধর, Hindi लीमा धर) is an Indian author.

== Education ==
Leema Dhar is undertaking a Ph.D. in feminism in Charlotte Brontë, Jane Eyre and Anne Brontë’s Agnes Grey from University of Allahabad.

== Career ==
Dhar's first anthology of Hindi poems कुछ लफ्ज़ नक़ाब में (2007) was published when she was in her teens (9th standard). Her second book and the first anthology of English poems For The Hundred Tomorrows (2010) was published when she was 16.

In 2015, Dhar was invited to read from her works at the 28th International Conference on Globalization, Environment, Education and Culture: India and Canada, hosted by the University of Allahabad.

== Works ==
- Dhar, Leema (22 February 2016). The Committed Sin. Amazon Digital Services LLC - KDP Print US. ISBN 9789384027537.
- You Touched My Heart. December 2013. ISBN 9789380914732.
- The Girl Who Kissed The Snake. June 2013. ISBN 9789380914596.
- Dhar, Leema (October 2012). Mom And I Love A terrorist. General Press. ISBN 9789380914282.
- Dhar, Leema (August 2012). Till We Meet Again. Diamond Pocket Books Pvt Limited. ISBN 9789350830895.
- For The Hundred Tomorrows. December 2010. ISBN 9789380019154.
- Kuch Nafz Naqab Mein. July 2007. ISBN 9789380019147.
