= Hayeon Lim =

South Korean socialite and author

- Born: July 3, 1993 (age 33); Seoul, South Korea
- Other name: Heiress Hayeon
- Education: Mount Holyoke College (BA); Sciences Po Paris; Sotheby's Institute of Art
- Occupation: Socialite • author

Signature
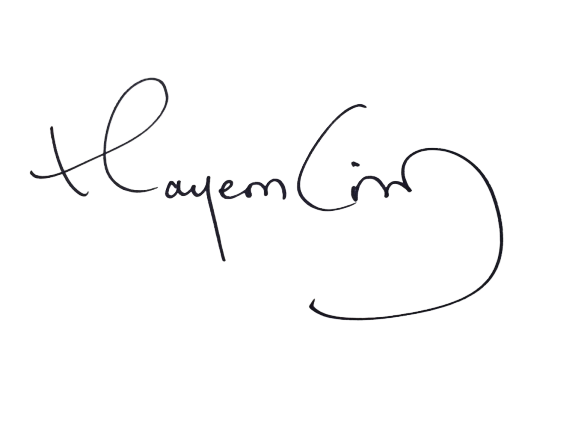

Hayeon Lim (Korean: 임하연; Hanja: 林河姸; born July 3, 1993), also known as Heiress Hayeon, is a South Korean socialite, and author.

== Early life ==
Hayeon Lim was born and raised in Seoul. Her father was a businessman, financier, banker and her mother was a housewife. From an early age, Lim was an avid reader and ardent student of opera singing. She won the first prize at Piano Times Concours in 2001, at age 7. She went to a master class at the Prague Conservatory at age 16. During her teenage years, she was educated in English, French, Italian and Chinese with private tutors. She dropped out of a high school in her second year. After then, she received an aristocratic homeschooling which focuses on liberal arts education she dubbed as 'Goethe-sque Study.'

== Education ==
She began her undergraduate years at Sotheby's Institute of Art, London in 2012 after accepted from her alma mater, Mount Holyoke College in South Hadley, Massachusetts. In London, she spent a semester enrolling in Art and Business program and made connections with art collectors. From this experience, Lim was inspired to write her first book Like Seventeen-yeard-old Goethe, which was published in August 2016. She attended Sciences Po (French: Institut d'études politiques de Paris) in Paris, France and graduated from Mount Holyoke College in 2017. During Mount Holyoke years, she started horse riding and was a member of the equestrian team. Lim double majored in Arts administration and History.

== Career ==
=== Charity ===
After returning to South Korea, she was involved in charity work. She served as a young member of Yéol foundation, which is running by one of the wives of the Hyundai families. Lim became a Young Yéol member through the Seven Sisters Association alumnae gathering in Seoul.

=== Ladies who Lunch ===
Lim briefly interned at Livet Reichard Company, in New York City. By then, she was introduced to the New York society through a referral. As an arts administration intern, she was invited to The Watermill Center Summer Benefit Gala at Whitney Fairchild's Bridgehampton house. There, Lim was inspired to write her second book. During her New York period, Lim enrolled at New York University (NYU) to take a course in public relations.

On February 28, 2020, Lim's second book <점심 먹는 아가씨들Ladies who Lunch>, was released. It ranked fifth among new essays bestseller list at Aladin bookstore during the pre-order period. She mostly writes about her life abroad in New York, Paris, and London. Her book evokes noblesse oblige to the privileged like chaebols.

== Cultural Depictions ==
On February 19, 2020, Lim was first featured in NewsPaper as "Heiress Hayeon." The articles reported "'Heiress Hayeon' has a strong message to deliver: All women are heiresses. Regardless of our birth and wealth, we all inherit something from somewhere. We are the ones who decide it." The following news articles began to portray her as 'Heiress Hayeon.' After then, it became her public persona. She still calls her fans as 'My heiresses'.

== Personal life ==
Lim is fluent in a variety of foreign languages such as English, French, Italian, and Chinese and is interested in various fields such as art collecting, charity, philanthropy and culture. She is also known for her style and fashion.
