= Stories from Firefly Island =

1993 book by Benedict Blathwayt

- First edition cover
- Author: Benedict Blathwayt
- Language: English
- Genre: Fantasy
- Publisher: Greenwillow Books
- Publication date: October 1, 1993
- Pages: 128
- ISBN: 0-688-12487-9

Stories from Firefly Island is a 1993 children's fantasy book written and illustrated by Benedict Blathwayt.

== Synopsis ==
Stories from Firefly Island is structured as a collection of short stories, each set on an jungle island populated by anthropomorphic animals. Each chapter is presented as an story within a story, with Tortoise (a wise elder of the island) teaching the other animals of the island a moral lesson of some kind through a fable.

== Publication history ==
The book was published in the United States by Greenwillow Books on October 1, 1993.

A selection of stories from the book was published in Rolf Harris' 2000 anthology Favourite Animal Stories.

== Reception ==
Stories from Firefly Island was well received upon release. A review in School Library Journal praised the prose for its use of "unusual, old-fashioned, out-of-the-ordinary words" and complimented the art. The Independent was slightly more critical, describing the stories as being "not quite Kipling" but complimenting the art and "entertaining" prose. Publishers Weekly said that the writing maintained a good balance between the moral of each story and the book's overall narrative, writing that "the messages never overpower" it. Kirkus Reviews was similarly positive, complimenting Blathwayt's characterization of each animal and the ease of reading the stories aloud, while Booklist also published a positive review.
