= A River Sutra =

1993 book by Gita Mehta

- First edition (US)
- Author: Gita Mehta
- Language: English
- Publisher: Doubleday (US); Heinemann (UK)
- Publication date: 1993
- Publication place: India
- ISBN: 0-679-75247-1

A River Sutra is a collection of short stories written by Indian-American writer Gita Mehta, which was published in 1993. The book's stories are interconnected by both a geographical reference (the Narmada River and the Narmada River Valley), and by the theme of diversity within Indian society, both present and past. Unlike some of Mehta's previous stories, the ones in A River Sutra feature only Indian characters.

== Plot ==
The book is published by Random House in Canada, Doubleday in the USA and the Heinemann in the UK. The book represents diversity in Indian culture, through its portrayal of music, religion, and major landmarks. The story is told in mid-to-late 20th century India and is set around the Narmada River in central India.

The story is told from the perspective of a retired bureaucrat who interacts with a variety of travellers and residents of the area. He has lost his wife and left his job and taken up to run a rest house near Narmada river. These stories are relayed to the reader through a series of vignettes. Through these stories, the major themes of love, the Narmada River, desire, the human heart, lust, and religion are explored.

Ashok was a wealthy industrialist, who renounces his leisurely world to become a Jain monk. As irony, his father though is sad from Ashok's decision, throughs a lavish send-off party. The next story is of a music teacher Mohan who commits suicide after his student is murdered a wealthy goon. The next storyline is of Nitin Bose, who comes to stay in the rest house to study local tribal religious methods. He tries to commit suicide in the river as he is under the impression that his ex-lover has cursed him. The narrator doesn't believe in the curse, but nevertheless helps Nitin meet the tribals to perform the cleansing ceremony. The next story is of a courtesan who comes searching her daughter she believes is kidnapped by a bandit. The woman continues her search in nearby areas and her daughter reaches the rest house, narrating how she fell in love with the bandit and willingly married him. The two women meet; but pretend to be strangers and continue in their own lives. The next story is of a musician lady, who is ugly but very talented in her music and is on spiritual journey. The next story is of a Naga Baba who rescues young girls from brothel. One such girl Uma now performs devotional songs on the banks of the river Narmada. In the next story, the narrator meet Professor Shankar, an archaeologist working on historical sites nearby the river. When Uma arrives in the rest house performing songs, the Professor confesses to the narrator on how he disguises as Naga Baba to save girls from superstitious temple exploitation.

== Reception ==
The novel is considered deliberately Indian through its theme, characters as well as structure; especially employing a narrator or sutradhar, which was common in oral traditions of Indian storytelling. Kirkus Reviews calls it "subtle profundity in a beautifully evoked setting". Ed Manning, writing for The Independent calls it "a far more resonant book", but lacking heart missing fully formed characters.
