= Just This Once =

1993 novel by Scott French

- First edition
- Author: Scott French, "Hal"
- Language: English
- Genre: Romance novel
- Publisher: Carol Publishing Group
- Publication date: 1993
- Publication place: USA
- Media type: Print (hardcover)
- Pages: 295
- ISBN: 1559721731

Just This Once is a 1993 romance novel written in the style of Jacqueline Susann by a Macintosh IIcx computer named "Hal" in collaboration with its programmer, Scott French. French reportedly spent $40,000 and 8 years developing an artificial intelligence program to analyze Susann's works and attempt to create a novel that Susann might have written. A legal dispute between the estate of Jacqueline Susann and the publisher resulted in a settlement to split the profits, and the book was referenced in several legal journal articles about copyright laws. The book had two small print runs totaling 35,000 copies, receiving mixed reviews.

== Creation ==
The novel's creation spanned the fields of artificial intelligence, expert systems, and natural language processing.

Scott French first scanned and analyzed portions of two books by Jacqueline Susann, Valley of the Dolls and Once Is Not Enough, to determine constituents of Susann's writing style, which French stated was the most difficult task. This analysis extracted several hundred components including frequency and type of sexual acts and sentence structure. "Once you're there, the writer's style emerges, part of her actual personality comes out, and the computer can be programmed to make a story." French also created several thousand rules to govern tone, plotting, scenes, and characters.

The text generated by Hal, the computer, was intended to mimic what Susann might have written, although the output required significant editing. French credits Hal's work with "almost 100% of the plot, 100% of the theme and style." French estimates that he wrote 10% of the prose, the computer Hal wrote about 25% of the prose, and the remaining two-thirds was more of a collaboration between the two. A typical scenario to write a scene would involve Hal asking questions that French would answer (for example, Hal might ask about the "cattiness factor" involved in a meeting between two key female characters, and French would reply with a range of 1 to 10), and the computer would then generate a few sentences to which French would make minor edits. The process would repeat for the next few sentences until the scene was written.

== Legal issues ==
Jacqueline Susann's publisher was skeptical of the legality of Just This Once, although French doubted that an author's thought processes could be copyrighted. Susann's estate reportedly threatened to sue Scott French but the parties settled out of court; the settlement involved splitting profits between the parties but the terms of the settlement were not disclosed.

The publication of Just This Once raised questions in the legal profession concerning how copyright law applies to computer-generated works derived from an analysis of other copyrighted works, and whether the generation of such works infringes on copyright. The publications on this topic suggested that the copyright laws of the time were ill-equipped to deal with computer-generated creative works.

== Reception ==
The book's publisher Steven Shragis of Carol Group said of the novel, "I'm not going to say this is a great literary work, but it's every bit as good as anything out in this field, and better than an awful lot."

The novel received some positive early reviews. In USA Today, novelist Thomas Gifford compared Just This Once to another novel in the same genre, American Star by Jackie Collins. Gifford concluded: "If you do like this stuff, you'd be much, much better off with the one written by the computer." The Dead Jackie Susann Quarterly declared that Susann "would be proud. Lots of money, sleaze, disease, death, oral sex, tragedy and the good girl gone bad."

Other reviews were mixed. Publishers Weekly wrote, "If the books of Jacqueline Susann and Harold Robbins seem formulaic, this debut novel of sin and success in Las Vegas outdoes them all. And that, in a way, is the point.... All novelty rests in the conceit of computer authorship, not in the story itself." Library Journal stated "French invested eight years and $50,000 in a scheme to use artificial intelligence to fulfill his authentic, if dubious, desire to generate a trashy novel a la Jacqueline Susann. Shallow, beautiful-people characters are flatly conceived and randomly accessed in a formulaic plot ... a sexy, boring morality tale. Of possible interest to computer buffs for its use of Expert Systems and the virtual promise of more worthy possibilities; others should read Susann." Kirkus Reviews wrote: "The deal here is that author French is not the author, he's just the midwife, having allegedly programmed his computer to write about our times just the way Susann would... almost perfectly capturing glamorous Jackie's turgid but E-Z reading prose style and ultrareliable mix of sex, glitz, dope 'n' despair.... One wonders, though, if French's tale spinning PC will do as well on the talkshows as Jackie did. The computer weenies have been trying to tell us for years, garbage in-garbage out."

== See also ==
- Procedural generation
- The Policeman's Beard is Half Constructed
