= Lisa Shea =

American novelist

Lisa Shea is an American novelist and the author of books published by W. W. Norton & Company. She was the recipient of a 1993 Whiting Award.

== Works ==
- Hula W W Norton, 1994, ISBN 9780393035896
