= Saken Omur =

Kyrgyz author and poet (1927)

- ساكەن ۅمۉر
- Born: 1927 (age 98–99); Karajül, Artush, Xinjiang
- Citizenship: China
- Writing career
- Language: Kyrgyz
- Genres: novels, short stories, poetry
- Notable work: Joyful Road

Saken Ömür (born 1927; Kyrgyz: ساكەن ۅمۉر) is a Kyrgyz writer and poet from China.

Saken was born in 1927 in Karajül village outside of Artush. From 1943 till 1946 he studied at Kashgar Normal College.

He worked as a teacher at the Central University for Nationalities from 1957 to 1966, and as an editor for the Kyzylsuu newspaper from 1979 till his retirement in 1987.

His first work When I see it with my own eyes (Öz közüm menen körgöndö) was published in 1961. During the sixties he also did a lot of work on the collecting, writing and publishing of Jusup Mamay's version of the Manas epic.

His novel Joyful Road (Şaŋduu jol) received the Tulpar literature award.

== Published books ==
- In the Kereme mountain valley (Kereme too öröönündö), 1987 (collection of stories) (ISBN 7537400075)
- Honour (Sıyımık), 1992
- Before Dawn (Taŋ aldında), 1993 (novel)
- Red flower (Kızılgül), 2004
- Joyful Road (Şaŋduu jol) (novel) (2004) (ISBN 7-228-08965-0)
