= Alexandre Farnoux =

French historian

- Education: French School at Athens
- Occupations: Historian, Minoan archaeologist

Alexandre Farnoux is a French historian, a specialist on the Minoan civilisation and Delos.

== Career ==
Alexandre Farnoux studied at the French School at Athens, he became director of this institute in September 2011.

He is professor of Greek archaeology at Paris-Sorbonne University and also teaches Greek history at the University of Strasbourg. He conducts research in Crete on the Minoan civilisation and is director of the excavation of a residential quarter in the Minoan city of Malia.

== Cnossos : L'archéologie d'un rêve ==
Cnossos : L'archéologie d'un rêve
- Author: Alexandre Farnoux
- Original title: Cnossos : L'archéologie d'un rêve
- Translator: David J. Baker
- Cover artist: Various
- Language: French
- Series: Découvertes Gallimard●Archéologie
- Release number: 175
- Subject: Knossos archaeology
- Genre: Nonfiction monograph
- Publisher: FR: Éditions Gallimard; US: Harry N. Abrams; UK: Thames & Hudson
- Publication date: 1993
- Publication place: France
- English publication date: 1996
- Media type: Print (Paperback)
- Pages: 160 pp.
- ISBN: 978-2-070-53183-7 (first edition)
- OCLC: 29779601
- Preceded by: Compostelle : Le grand chemin
- Followed by: Ingmar Bergman, le magicien du Nord
- Website: www.gallimard.fr/Catalogue/GALLIMARD/Decouvertes-Gallimard/Decouvertes-Gallimard/Archeologie/Cnossos

An overview of the archaeological discoveries made in Knossos, Crete, from the beginning of the 20th century, especially by the British archaeologist Arthur Evans, a wealthy Englishman, who found the legendary palace of King Minos. From a plethora of bric-à-brac—frescoes, ceramics, clay tablets covered with unknown writings—Evans recreated an immense civilisation, totally original. A peaceful world which flourished some forty centuries ago, long before Mycenae, radiated throughout the Mediterranean.

Alexandre Farnoux retraces step by step the rigorous and inspired work of Arthur Evans—the excavations, interpretations, restorations, which will remain, with regard to History, the magician of Knossos—in this pocket-sized volume entitled Cnossos : L'archéologie d'un rêve (lit. 'Knossos: The Archaeology of a Dream'; UK edition – Knossos: Unearthing a Legend; US edition – Knossos: Searching for the Legendary Palace of King Minos), published by Éditions Gallimard. It was released in 1993 in the Archéologie series of Gallimard's "Découvertes" collection. According to standards of the collection, the book is profusely illustrated with colour plates—Minoan frescoes, maps, drawings, paintings, photographs of artefacts and excavations, etc.—and printed on glossy paper.

The book opens with a "pre-credit", which is a series of full-page illustrations showing some drawings and photographs of the palace of Knossos. The first chapter "Terra Incognita" presents Crete, the Greek island as an unknown land at the end of 19th century when Knossos was approached by Evans. The second chapter "Impatience" tells the works of archaeologists. "In the Land of the Griffin" (chap. III) recounts the excavations at Knossos. "The Magician of Knossos" (chap. IV) traces the rebirth of the palace of Knossos thanks to the dream of the English archaeologist. The last chapter "Minoan Art Nouveau" is about the exoticism and the surprising familiarity of the Cretan discoveries, which together presented a sort of ideal image of a modern-day antiquity:

The royalty of the fleur-de-lys, the virgin mother, Our Lady of the Mountain or of the Waves, the plastic symbols, the number three or the cross, the 'Parisienne' of Knossos, the boxers, and toreadors bring very close to us a life separated from our own by thousands of years.

— Henri Berr, preface to Gustave Glotz's The Aegean Civilisation (1925)

In its second part—the "Documents" section—the book provides a compilation of excerpts divided into eight parts: 1, In the Labyrinth; 2, The return of the Minotaur; 3, The past informs the present; 4, Archaeology and imagination; 5, The Minoan world today; 6, The Minoans in the headlines; 7, Forgers in the realm of Minos; 8, Cretan writing. The book closes with a list of further reading, chronology, list of illustrations, an index and a full-page photograph of Arthur Evans at Knossos. It has been translated into American and British English, Italian and South Korean.

== Selected publications ==
As author

- Cnossos : L'archéologie d'un rêve, collection « Découvertes Gallimard » (nº 175), série Archéologie. Éditions Gallimard, 1993
  - UK edition – Knossos: Unearthing a Legend, 'New Horizons' series. Thames & Hudson, 1996
  - US edition – Knossos: Searching for the Legendary Palace of King Minos, "Abrams Discoveries" series. Harry N. Abrams, 1996
- Homère : Le prince des poètes, collection « Découvertes Gallimard » (nº 555), série Littératures. Éditions Gallimard, 2010

As contributor

- Sophie Basch, Delvaux and Antiquity, Exhibitions International, 2010

As editor

- With Nicoletta Momigliano, Cretomania: Modern Desires for the Minoan Past, Routledge, 2016
- With Katherine Harloe and Nicoletta Momigliano, Hellenomania, Routledge, 2018
