= Ace (Doctor Who) =

Fictional character from Doctor Who

- Doctor Who character
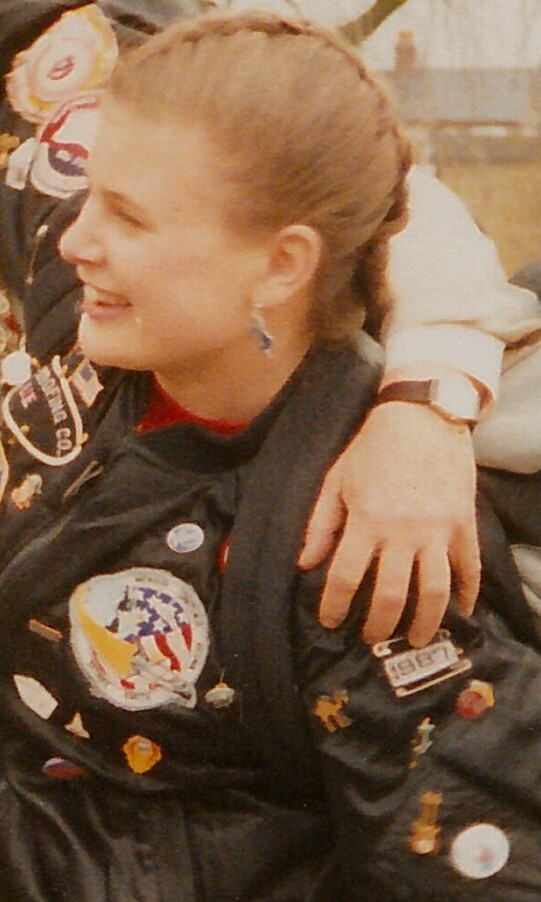
- Sophie Aldred as Ace as seen during filming of 1988's Remembrance of the Daleks
- First appearance: Dragonfire (1987)
- Last appearance: Tales of the TARDIS (2023)
- Created by: John Nathan-Turner; Andrew Cartmel
- Portrayed by: Sophie Aldred
- Non-canonical appearances: Dimensions in Time (1993)
- Duration: 1987–1989, 1993, 2022–2023

In-universe information
- Full name: Dorothy
- Species: Human
- Gender: Female
- Affiliation: Seventh Doctor; Thirteenth Doctor; UNIT
- Family: Audrey Dudman (mother)
- Relatives: Frank Dudman (grandfather); Kathleen Dudman (grandmother)
- Origin: London, England
- Home: Earth
- Home era: 20th and 21st centuries (born c. 1970, leaves Earth c. 1987)

Ace is a fictional character played by Sophie Aldred in the long-running British science fiction television series Doctor Who. A 20th-century Earth teenager from the London suburb of Perivale, she is a companion of the Seventh Doctor and was a regular in the series from 1987 to 1989 and returned in 2022. She is considered one of the Doctor's most popular companions.

Ace appeared in ten stories (32 episodes), and was the final companion in the original run of the classic series.

Doctor Who script editor Andrew Cartmel said that the character was written to be a "fighter and not a screamer". In the television series Ace reveals that her real given name is Dorothy. Her family name is never explicitly stated in the series but spin-off media refer to her as Dorothy Gale, Dorothy McShane and Dorothy Gale McShane.

== Character history ==
The streetwise teen character was developed by Andrew Cartmel, strongly influenced by a female space engineer in Love and Rockets. Ace is a 16-year-old human who first appears in the 1987 serial Dragonfire, where she is working as a waitress in the frozen food retail complex of Iceworld on the planet Svartos. She had been a troubled teen on Earth, having been expelled from school for blowing up the art room as a "creative statement". Gifted in chemistry (despite failing the subject at O-level), she was in her room experimenting with the extraction of nitroglycerin from gelignite when an explosion (later revealed to be a time-storm created by Fenric) swept her up and transported her to Iceworld, many years in the future. There, she meets the Doctor and his companion Mel. When Mel leaves the Doctor at the conclusion of the serial, he offers to take Ace with him in the TARDIS, and she happily accepts.

Ace suffered traumatic events in her childhood, including a bad relationship with her mother Audrey (the daughter of merchant seaman Frank William Dudman and his wife Kathleen, who served in the Women's Royal Naval Service during World War II) and the racially motivated Molotov cocktail firebombing of her friend Manisha's flat when she was 13. Following the latter event, needing to lash out, she burned down a local abandoned Victorian house named Gabriel Chase after sensing the presence of the villain Light there and was put on probation. Consequently, Ace covered up her own fears and insecurities with a streetwise, tough exterior. Her weapons of choice included a baseball bat and a powerful explosive, disapproved of by the Doctor (who nonetheless found it useful on occasion), she called "Nitro-9", which she invented and mixed up in canisters she carried in her backpack.

Affectionately giving the Doctor the nickname of "Professor", Ace is convinced that he needs her to watch his back, and protects him with a fierce loyalty. In turn, the Doctor seems to take a special interest in Ace's education, taking her across the universe and often prompting her to figure out explanations for herself rather than giving her all the answers. However, the Seventh Doctor's increasing tendency to manipulate events and people (including her), even with what appears to be the best of intentions, results in several difficult moments in their relationship.

Under the Doctor's tutelage, Ace fights the Daleks in Remembrance of the Daleks, the Cybermen in Silver Nemesis, encounters the all-powerful Gods of Ragnarok in The Greatest Show in the Galaxy, the sadistic torturer Kandy Man in The Happiness Patrol, and many other dangers. She also faces the ghosts of her own past in Ghost Light and The Curse of Fenric, coming to terms with them and, ironically, creating them in the latter case thanks to the paradoxes of time travel. Over time, she starts to mature into a confident young woman, and her brash exterior ceases to be a front.

What the Doctor is aware of, but Ace is not, is that her arrival on Iceworld was no accident but part of a larger scheme stretching across the centuries and conceived by Fenric, an evil that had existed since the beginning of the universe. Ace is a "Wolf of Fenric", one of many descendants of a Norseman tainted with Fenric's genetic instructions to help free it from its ancient prison so it can evolve humans into the Vampiric Haemovores, and a pawn in the complex game between it and the Doctor. After Fenric is defeated in 1943, Ace continues to journey with the Doctor.

The circumstances of Ace's parting of ways with the Doctor are not known, as the series went on hiatus in 1989 with the end of the very next serial, Survival, in which Ace is returned by the Doctor to Perivale but ultimately chooses to leave again with him. A painting seen in the extended version of Silver Nemesis suggests that at some point in her personal future Ace will end up in 18th or 19th century France. This idea is further explored in the novelisation of The Curse of Fenric and the Virgin New Adventures. The novelisation contains an epilogue not included in the televised serial, in which the Doctor visits an older Ace in 1887 Paris.

If the series had continued, the production team's intent was to have Ace eventually enter the Prydonian Academy on the Doctor's home planet of Gallifrey and train to be a Time Lord. The story Ice Time by Marc Platt, in which this would happen, was never made. When the Seventh Doctor is next seen in the 1996 Doctor Who television movie, he is travelling alone, with no reference made as to what had happened to Ace. In "The Power of the Doctor" (2022), it is said that Ace and the Doctor had some sort of "fallout" which led to her leaving, although what exactly happened is never clarified.

However, in The Sarah Jane Adventures story Death of the Doctor, Sarah Jane reveals that she has done research on some of the Doctor's companions, and found that "Dorothy" runs a charity called "A Charitable Earth". A promotional video made to advertise the Blu-ray release of Doctor Who's twenty-sixth season shows Ace as the head of A Charitable Earth.

She appeared in "The Power of the Doctor" celebrating the BBC Centenary, alongside the returning former companion Tegan Jovanka, the two of them now having been hired by Kate Stewart to work as UNIT freelancers. Ace is reunited with the Doctor - now in their thirteenth incarnation - and helps to defeat the Master, the Cybermen and the Daleks, briefly working alongside the Thirteenth Doctor's former companion Graham O'Brien to blow up the Daleks' volcano base. During the adventure, an AI hologram of the Doctor briefly takes on the form of the Seventh Doctor who reconciles with Ace for their falling out. After the adventure, Ace joins Graham's companion support group.

In Tales of the TARDIS, Ace reunited with an aged Seventh Doctor and discussed their adventures. They also discussed the meeting with Fenric and both apologised to each other for falling out. After this, Ace reflected on how she went to visit her grandmother years after Fenric and expressed her love for the Doctor as the father she never had. They then decided to take a trip together across time and space in the TARDIS.

== Other appearances ==
Ace in her Spacefleet uniform, after rejoining the Doctor in Deceit.

Ace and the Seventh Doctor appeared twice more on television after Doctor Who was cancelled. The first occasion was in 1990, in a special episode of the BBC2 educational programme Search Out Science. In this episode, the Doctor acts as a quiz show host, asking questions about astronomy; Ace, K-9 and "Cedric, from the planet Glurk" are the contestants. The last appearance of Ace on British television was in the Dr Who TV special "The Power of the Doctor" (2022) in Jodie Whittaker's final appearance as the Doctor.

Ace was also featured in the Doctor Who Magazine comic strip sporadically, one of the few television companions to appear in it.

The character is extensively developed in the New Adventures, a BBC-licensed series of novels from Virgin Books continuing on from Survival. Ace becomes more and more frustrated with the Doctor's manipulations; he forcibly separates her from a potential relationship with Robin Yeadon in Nightshade and sacrifices her lover Jan to defeat the alien Hoothi in Love and War by Paul Cornell, which proves to be the last straw. She leaves the TARDIS, joins Spacefleet and fights the Daleks for three years, later rejoining the Doctor and his new companion Bernice Summerfield in Deceit by Peter Darvill-Evans, older and more hardened. This development in the character was the result of a deliberate decision by Darvill-Evans as the editor of the line at Virgin to change Ace and her role in the ongoing narrative. It is first revealed in Blood Heat by Jim Mortimore that Manisha had died in the firebombing of her flat.

Ace's relationship with the Doctor remains strained for some time, boiling over in Blood Heat when the Doctor destroys an unstable parallel Earth (where Manisha is still alive) and under the influence of an alien creature she stabs him through one of his hearts in The Left-Handed Hummingbird. In No Future (also by Cornell) the Meddling Monk tries to manipulate her into betraying the Doctor, which she seemingly does, again stabbing him and leaving him alone on an ice planet. In reality she stabbed him with a pantomime knife from the TARDIS wardrobe and she is playing her own game (partly to teach him what it feels like to be manipulated). When the Monk and his chained Chronovore offer her a chance to return Jan to life, she refuses and rejoins the TARDIS crew, her issues with the Doctor resolved. In Set Piece by Kate Orman, Ace becomes stranded in Ancient Egypt and comes to realise that she can survive without the Doctor, but that she also increasingly sees the world as he does. At the book's end she leaves the Doctor again to become Time's Vigilante, using a short-range time hopper mounted on a motorcycle to patrol a particular segment of time; in effect doing what the Doctor does, but on a smaller scale. She appears in later books, notably Head Games, Happy Endings, and Lungbarrow.

Other spin-off media give contradictory versions of Ace's eventual fate. The comic strip in Doctor Who Magazine has Ace killed off just prior to the events of the 1996 television movie (Ground Zero, DWM #238-#242). In the webcast audio play Death Comes to Time, Ace inherits the mantle of the Time Lords when they become extinct.

Ace's first name is Dorothy, and production notes suggested a possible last name of Gale if desired, an allusion to The Wonderful Wizard of Oz. In another contradiction, the novels (and, following their lead, Big Finish audio plays) have given Ace the last name of McShane. A sequence of BBC Books' Past Doctor Adventures set after Survival and written by Mike Tucker and Robert Perry used the "Dorothy Gale" name, as the authors were unaware of the name used in the New Adventures. This was eventually resolved to some extent when the novel Loving the Alien by Tucker and Perry saw the original Ace (Dorothy Gale) shot and killed, but replaced by an Ace from another universe whose real name is "Dorothy McShane". Loving the Alien also makes it clear that all the television episodes and Tucker/Perry novels occur before the New Adventures, thus reconciling the different ranges.

Sophie Aldred has voiced Ace for several audio plays produced by Big Finish Productions, alongside Sylvester McCoy as the Seventh Doctor and, in some stories, Lisa Bowerman as Bernice Summerfield or Philip Olivier as Hex Schofield. In one of these stories, The Rapture, Ace discovers that she has a brother named Liam, of whom she had no previous knowledge. As the more experienced traveller, Ace has developed a slightly flirtatious mentor-teacher relationship with Hex. How the audio plays tie in with the other media is not clear, and the continuity of the various lines may not match up with each other.

In 1996, Virgin's Doctor Who Books imprint published a hardback by Sophie Aldred and Mike Tucker entitled Ace!: The Inside Story of the End of an Era (ISBN 1-85227-574-X). This book gives details of each serial featuring the character Ace, complete with many photographs and concept art. It also contains a list of other spin-offs in which the character of Ace appears and some of the conventions which Sophie Aldred attended, along with information about the planned Season 27, including Ace's departure. In 1998, BBV produced a number of audio adventures starring McCoy and Aldred as "The Professor" and "Ace". The plays were not licensed by the BBC, but the duo were clearly intended to be the same characters, to the extent that the BBC intervened, causing BBV to change the character names to "The Dominie" and "Alice".

The Reeltime Pictures video Mindgame features Sophie Aldred as "the Human", imprisoned with a Sontaran and a Draconian, the implication being that she is playing Ace, though for copyright reasons this could not be made explicit.

In 2018, Ace was confirmed to appear in Big Finish Production's audio drama based on Doctor Who spin-off Class, with Aldred reprising her role alongside the show's main cast. The story released that August.

In 2020, BBC Books published At Childhood's End (ISBN 9781785944994), a novel by Aldred featuring Ace, decades after her travels with the Doctor and now running the "A Charitable Earth" charity. The novel also features the Thirteenth Doctor and her companions. Like the charity, the title of the novel forms the acronym "ACE".

== Legacy ==
The character of Ace has been cited as the first "modern" companion for the Doctor. One of the reasons is that her character was written to be more realistic, three-dimensional and to grow as a person throughout her run on the show.

== List of appearances ==
=== Television ===
Season 24

- Dragonfire

Season 25

- Remembrance of the Daleks
- The Happiness Patrol
- Silver Nemesis
- The Greatest Show in the Galaxy

Season 26

- Battlefield
- Ghost Light
- The Curse of Fenric
- Survival

30th anniversary special

- Dimensions in Time

2022 specials

- "The Power of the Doctor"

2023 specials

- Tales of the TARDIS: The Curse of Fenric

=== Audio dramas ===
Doctor Who: The Monthly Adventures

- The Fearmonger
- The Genocide Machine
- The Shadow of the Scourge
- Dust Breeding
- Colditz
- The Rapture
- The Dark Flame
- The Harvest
- Dreamtime
- LIVE 34
- Night Thoughts
- The Settling
- No Man's Land
- Nocturne
- The Dark Husband
- Forty-Five
- The Prisoner's Dilemma
- The Magic Mousetrap
- Enemy of the Daleks
- The Angel of Scutari
- Project Destiny
- A Death in the Family
- Lurkers at Sunlight's Edge
- Protect and Survive
- Black and White
- Gods and Monsters
- 1963: The Assassination Games
- Afterlife
- Revenge of the Swarm
- Mask of Tragedy
- Signs and Wonders
- You Are the Doctor and Other Stories
- A Life of Crime
- Fiesta of the Damned
- Maker of Demons
- Shadow Planet / World Apart
- The High Price of Parking
- The Blood Furnace
- The Silurian Candidate
- Red Planets
- The Dispossessed
- The Quantum Possibility Engine
- Muse of Fire
- An Alien Werewolf in London
- Dark Universe
- The Flying Dutchman / Displaced
- The Grey Man of the Mountain

Doctor Who: Special Releases

- The Veiled Leopard
- Destiny of the Doctor: Shockwave
- The Light at the End
- The Eighth of March: The Big Blue Book
- The Legacy of Time: The Split Infinitive

Doctor Who: The Lost Stories

- Thin Ice
- Crime of the Century
- Animal
- Earth Aid

Doctor Who: The Seventh Doctor Adventures

- UNIT: Dominion (cameo)
- The Last Day 1
- The Last Day 2

Doctor Who: Novel Adaptations

- Love and War
- Theatre of War
- All-Consuming Fire
- Nightshade

Doctor Who: The New Adventures of Bernice Summerfield

- Volume 1
  - Good Night, Sweet Ladies
  - Random Ghosts
  - The Lights of Skaro
- Volume 2: The Triumph of Sutekh
  - The Pyramid of Sutekh
  - The Vaults of Osiris
  - The Eye of Horus
  - The Tears of Isis

Doctor Who: The Tenth Doctor Adventures

- Tenth Doctor, Classic Companions
  - Quantum of Axos

Gallifrey

- Intervention Earth
- Enemy Lines
- Time War 1
  - Celestial Intervention
  - Soldier Obscura

Class: The Audio Adventures

- In Remembrance

Torchwood: Monthly Range

- The Red List
- Death in Venice
- Sabotage

Doctor Who: Short Trips

- Police and Shreeves
- Critical Mass
- Seven to One
- The Riparian Ripper
- The Shadow Trader
- Crystal Ball
- Dark Convoy
- Washington Burns
- The Shrine of Sorrows
- Forever Fallen
- Doctors and Dragons
- Dead Woman Walking

=== Novels ===
Virgin New Adventures

- Timewyrm: Genesys by John Peel
- Timewyrm: Exodus by Terrance Dicks
- Timewyrm: Apocalypse by Nigel Robinson
- Timewyrm: Revelation by Paul Cornell
- Cat's Cradle: Time's Crucible by Marc Platt
- Cat's Cradle: Warhead by Andrew Cartmel
- Cat's Cradle: Witch Mark by Andrew Hunt
- Nightshade by Mark Gatiss
- Love and War by Paul Cornell
- Deceit by Peter Darvill-Evans
- Lucifer Rising by Jim Mortimore and Andy Lane
- White Darkness by David A. McIntee
- Shadowmind by Christopher Bulis
- Birthright by Nigel Robinson
- Blood Heat by Jim Mortimore
- The Dimension Riders by Daniel Blythe
- The Left-Handed Hummingbird by Kate Orman
- Conundrum by Steve Lyons
- No Future by Paul Cornell
- Tragedy Day by Gareth Roberts
- Legacy by Gary Russell
- Theatre of War by Justin Richards
- All-Consuming Fire by Andy Lane
- Blood Harvest by Terrance Dicks
- Strange England by Simon Messingham
- First Frontier by David A. McIntee
- St Anthony's Fire by Mark Gatiss
- Falls the Shadow by Daniel O'Mahony
- Parasite by Jim Mortimore
- Warlock by Andrew Cartmel
- Set Piece by Kate Orman
- Head Games by Steve Lyons
- Happy Endings by Paul Cornell
- The Death of Art by Simon Bucher-Jones
- Lungbarrow by Marc Platt

Past Doctor Adventures

- Illegal Alien by Mike Tucker and Robert Perry
- The Hollow Men by Martin Day and Keith Topping
- Matrix by Mike Tucker and Robert Perry
- Storm Harvest by Mike Tucker and Robert Perry
- Prime Time by Mike Tucker
- Independence Day by Peter Darvill-Evans
- Relative Dementias by Mark Michalowski
- Heritage by Dale Smith
- Loving the Alien by Mike Tucker and Robert Perry
- The Algebra of Ice by Lloyd Rose
- Atom Bomb Blues by Andrew Cartmel
- The Colony of Lies by Colin Brake

Telos Doctor Who novellas

- Citadel of Dreams by Dave Stone

Penguin Fiftieth Anniversary eBook novellas

- The Ripple Effect by Malorie Blackman

BBC Books

- At Childhood's End by Sophie Aldred

=== Short stories ===
- "Question Mark Pyjamas", by Mike Tucker and Robert Perry (Decalog 2: Lost Property)
- "Stop the Pigeon", by Mike Tucker and Robert Perry (Short Trips)
- "uPVC", by Paul Farnsworth (More Short Trips)
- "Monsters", by Tara Samms (Short Trips and Sidesteps)
- "Storm in a Tikka", by Mike Tucker and Robert Perry (Short Trips and Sidesteps)
- "Virgin Lands", by Sarah Groenewegen (Short Trips: Zodiac)
- "Hymn of the City", by Sarah Groenewegen (Short Trips: The Muses)
- "Cold War", by Rebecca Levene (Short Trips: Steel Skies)
- "Ante Bellum", by Stephen Hatcher (Short Trips: Past Tense)
- "Echo", by Lance Parkin (Short Trips: Life Science)
- "A Rose By Any Other Name", by Jim Mortimore (Short Trips: Life Science)
- "The Ghost's Story", by Trevor Baxendale (Short Trips: Repercussions)
- "Last Rites", by Marc Platt (Short Trips: Monsters)
- "These Things Take Time", by Samantha Baker (Short Trips: Monsters)
- "Categorical Imperative", by Simon Guerrier (Short Trips: Monsters)
- "A Yuletide Tail: Part One", by Dave Stone (Short Trips: A Christmas Treasury)
- "A Yuletide Tail: Part Two", by Dave Stone (Short Trips: A Christmas Treasury)
- "Six Impossible Things Before Breakfast", by Dan Abnett (Short Trips: A Day in the Life)
- "The Heroine, The Hero and the Meglomaniac", by Ian Mond, (Short Trips: A Day in the Life)
- "Presence", by Peter Anghelides (Short Trips: The History of Christmas)
- "The Anchorite's Echo", by Scott Andrews (Short Trips: The History of Christmas)
- "Natalie's Diary", by Joseph Lidster (Short Trips: Dalek Empire)
- "The Report", by Gary Russell (Short Trips: Snapshots)
- "But Once a Year", by Colin Harvey (Short Trips: The Ghosts of Christmas)
- "The Tide and Time", by Neil Corry (Short Trips: Defining Patterns)
- "One Card For The Curious", by Xanna Eve Chown (Short Trips: Defining Patterns)
- "Seance", by John Davies (Short Trips: Defining Patterns)
- "The Devil Like a Bear", by Brian Willis (Short Trips: Defining Patterns)
- "Pierrot le Who?", by Andrew K Lawston (Shelf Life)

=== Misc ===
- Ace Returns! I The Collection: Season 26 Announcement Trailer I Doctor Who
