= The Dimension Riders =

1993 novel by Daniel Blythe

- Author: Daniel Blythe
- Cover artist: Jeff Cummins
- Series: Doctor Who book: Virgin New Adventures
- Release number: 20
- Subject: Featuring: Seventh Doctor; Ace, Bernice
- Publisher: Virgin Books
- Publication date: November 1993
- ISBN: 0-426-20397-6
- Preceded by: Blood Heat
- Followed by: The Left-Handed Hummingbird

The Dimension Riders is an original novel written by Daniel Blythe and based on the long-running British science fiction television series Doctor Who. It features the Seventh Doctor, Ace and Bernice. A prelude to the novel, also penned by Blythe, appeared in Doctor Who Magazine #206. This novel is the second novel in the "Alternate Universe cycle" which continues until No Future.
