= The Left-Handed Hummingbird =

1993 novel by Kate Orman

- Author: Kate Orman
- Cover artist: Pete Wallbank
- Series: Doctor Who book: Virgin New Adventures
- Release number: 21
- Subject: Featuring: Seventh Doctor; Ace, Bernice
- Publisher: Virgin Books
- Publication date: December 1993
- ISBN: 0-426-20404-2
- Preceded by: The Dimension Riders
- Followed by: Conundrum

The Left-Handed Hummingbird is an original novel written by Kate Orman and based on the long-running British science fiction television series Doctor Who. It features the Seventh Doctor, Ace and Bernice. A prelude to the novel, also written by Orman, appeared in Doctor Who Magazine #207. This novel is the third novel in the "Alternate Universe cycle" which continues until No Future.

This book was Kate Orman's first sale. It was also the first New Adventure written by a woman, and the first written by an Antipodean.

== Background ==
The Left Handed Hummingbird was Kate Orman's first published novel.

== Continuity ==
There are several references to the serial The Aztecs.
