= The Gallifrey Chronicles =

The Gallifrey Chronicles may refer to the following books related to Doctor Who:

- The Gallifrey Chronicles (Peel book), 1991
- The Gallifrey Chronicles (Parkin novel), 2005
