= Timewyrm: Revelation =

1991 novel by Paul Cornell

- Author: Paul Cornell
- Cover artist: Andrew Skilleter
- Series: Doctor Who book: Virgin New Adventures
- Release number: 4
- Subject: Featuring: Seventh Doctor; Ace
- Publisher: Virgin Books
- Publication date: December 1991
- ISBN: 0-426-20360-7
- Preceded by: Timewyrm: Apocalypse
- Followed by: Cat's Cradle: Time's Crucible

Timewyrm: Revelation is an original Doctor Who novel, published by Virgin Publishing in their New Adventures range of Doctor Who novels. It features the Seventh Doctor and Ace, as well as cameo appearances by the Doctor's mental representations of his first, third, fourth and fifth incarnations.

This is the first novel to feature a personification of Death, who turns out to be one of the Eternals, and sets the scene for future New Adventures in which the Doctor becomes Time's Champion. Death has also crossed over into the Big Finish Productions audio dramas; in Master, the Master is described as Death's Champion. The novel is also the final part of the Timewyrm quartet. It has been described as the point at which "the books entered adult terrain".

== Synopsis ==
The battle to defeat the Timewyrm having taken the Seventh Doctor and Ace to Ancient Mesopotamia, 1950s Britain and the edge of the universe at the end of time finally ends within the Doctor's own mind with only his past incarnations to help him after Ace is killed by a playground bully.

== Plot ==
Having lost track of the Timewyrm, the Doctor chooses the TARDIS's next destination apparently at random. The TARDIS arrives in the village of Cheldon Bonniface in the late 19th century. While the Doctor is playing chess with an old friend, Ace is attacked by a child-sized astronaut. Ace evades her attacker, but as she flees the village, she suddenly discovers that they are actually on the surface of the Moon. Away from the protective environment of the faux-village, Ace dies. The astronaut, an eight-year-old boy named Chad Boyle, uses a small device to extract Ace's memories and transmit them elsewhere.

The Doctor discovers the illusion, but is surprised to see that his old friend is in fact Lieutenant Hemmings of the British Free Corps (from Timewyrm: Exodus). The Doctor makes his way back to the TARDIS, where he discovers that he is really on the Moon in December 1992. The Timewyrm killed Chad Boyle and Hemmings and sent their minds after Ace's. She took possession of Boyle's body and waited for the Doctor to confront her.

Ace wakes up on a pier overlooking a beach. She comes across a receptionist, who informs her that she died as the result of the Doctor finally losing one of his games. Ace is taken to the afterlife to be judged. She found herself in a library where she meets a kindly old Librarian. After exploring for a while, she decides that she must be dreaming. She concentrates on the village of Cheldon Bonniface.

In Cheldon Bonniface in 1992, the Reverend Ernest Trelaw is conducting the usual Sunday service, the last before Christmas. Present in his church are two newcomers, Peter and Emily Hutchings. Also present is the self-aware non-corporeal intelligence that has existed on the site of the church since long before the church existed. The Rev. Trelaw knows this intelligence as Saul, and both of them are shocked to see their old friend the Doctor run into the church in the middle of the service and deliver a baby into the arms of Emily Hutchings, before running out again. Later in the same service, Saul receives a psychic warning and shouts for all the congregants to leave. Hearing a disembodied voice speak, the congregants exit, except for Emily and Peter. Suddenly, and with a tremendous explosion that devastates the surrounding countryside, the entire church is transported to the surface of the Moon. Elsewhere, Ace suddenly gets the feeling that she has done something terribly wrong.

The church materializes around the Doctor and Ace's body. The Doctor retrieves an amulet that he had hidden in the church the last time he had been there, and gives it to Peter and Emily, telling them to find a use for it. The Doctor leaves the church to confront the Timewyrm. After a brief conversation, the Doctor dances with the personification of Death that the Timewyrm had conjured, and dies. The Timewyrm extracts the Doctor's memories and sends them after Ace's, animates the Doctor's body, and marches it into the church where it collapses.

In Hell, Ace is being subjected to excruciating torment by her childhood nemesis, Chad Boyle. She is once again eight-years-old and helpless to defend herself as Boyle imposes his bigoted eight-year-old worldview on the school. The Doctor arrives and rescues Ace, returning her to adulthood. She responds by punching him in the face, her way of saying "Thanks for getting me killed." They meet the Librarian in a splendid rose garden. The Librarian gives Ace her bomber jacket, rucksack, and ghetto blaster, and then speaks with the Doctor. The Timewyrm is trying to take control of the garden, but the Librarian is opposing her. Ace hears Boyle's laugh in the distance, and goes to find him. The Doctor follows. Ace finds Boyle in the center of a maze, covering his eyes and counting, armed with a sub-machine gun and many grenades. As she creeps up behind him, she thinks about blasting him with a Nitro-9 canister, but decided that murder was still murder, even in Hell.

The Doctor meditates. Back at the church on the Moon, Saul begins chanting a peculiar rhyme. The others try to puzzle out what it might mean. They eventually figure out that it is a message from the Doctor. On the Doctor's instructions, they find Hemmings's disembodied head on the Moon's surface, and Saul telekinetically returns it to the church.

Following a battle against Boyle involving grenades and Nitro-9, the Doctor rejoins Ace and explains that they aren’t literally in Hell, but in some alternative dimension to their own. They are soon joined by the Timewyrm, who is trying to drive a wedge between the Doctor and Ace. To that end, she summons a wave of beings: intelligent reptilian people, soldiers in UNIT uniforms, and three individuals named Katarina, Sara Kingdom, and Adric, who all blame the Doctor for their deaths. The Doctor is tormented by their accusations. The Timewyrm leaves them to continue their hopeless journey to The Pit, the center of this strange world.

Meanwhile, Hemmings has been given another area of this world to control, and has imprisoned the previous occupant, a tall, elegantly dressed man with a shock of wild white hair. When the Doctor and Ace arrive, they are arrested by Nazis and placed in a cell with the tall man. While Ace is taken away to be tortured, the Doctor and the Prisoner manage to escape. Back at the church, Saul, Emily, and Peter try to find a way to communicate with the head, over Ernest's religious objections. They succeed, but only for a moment, after which Hemmings finally dies. The zone Hemmings created begins to fall apart. The Doctor and the Prisoner escape while the zone collapses. The Doctor tells the Prisoner he is making for the Pit, and to that end, they made their way to a river which divides the various zones, and are met by a Ferryman wearing a floppy brown hat and long multi-colored scarf.

Ace wakes up again, this time in a world where she grew up in a happy and uncomplicated life. She never became a rebellious youth, but merely went along with the prevailing fashions of the time. At the back of her mind, she knows this is wrong. Eventually, she realizes the truth and escapes the trap. She finds the Doctor facing off with Chad Boyle, who stabs him with a sword. Ace helps the Doctor as they continue their journey toward the Pit. The Timewyrm appears again and explains to Ace that they are within the Doctor's mind.

At the Church, Ernest can see the Doctor's body is faring poorly. The medallion suddenly began to pulse with energy and grows before their eyes. The runes written on it coalesce into another message from the Doctor, this time telling them to open a dimensional portal. Saul's psychic powers provide the energies while Peter's mathematical abilities establish and stabilize the conduit. Emily travels along it to find the Doctor and Ace. She finds them immediately upon arrival and tries to get them back through the medallion portal, but they are being chased by the horde of the Doctor's demons. Emily manages to get herself and the Doctor away, but Ace is left behind.

Once freed from his own mind, the Doctor knows he can destroy the Timewyrm forever, but not without sacrificing Ace. Meanwhile, Ace decides to continue down into the Pit, where she finds the Doctor's conscience, a fair-haired man in light-colored clothes being perpetually tortured. Ace sets him free, and as his wounds heal before her eyes, Ace sees that he is dressed like a cricketer. The Doctor pilots the TARDIS to the intersection between reality and the fiction of his own imagination and rescues Ace. He also spares the Timewyrm, taking her consciousness and depositing it into the body of the baby he had given to Emily. The Hutchings agree to raise the child as their own, and at the Doctor's behest, name her Ishtar. The battle with the Timewyrm is over.

== Development ==
Cornell originally wrote the story with the Fifth Doctor and his companions and it was serialised in the fanzine Queen Bat. He then substantially re-worked it for Virgin.
