= War of the Daleks =

1997 novel by John Peel

- Author: John Peel
- Series: Doctor Who book: Eighth Doctor Adventures
- Release number: 5
- Subject: Featuring: Eighth Doctor; Sam
- Publisher: BBC Books
- Publication date: October 1997
- ISBN: 0-563-40573-2
- Preceded by: Genocide
- Followed by: Alien Bodies

War of the Daleks is an original novel written by John Peel, published in 1997, based on the long-running British science fiction television series Doctor Who. It features the Eighth Doctor and Sam.

This story chronicles the demise of Davros once and for all and the rising of the supreme Dalek force. This also conflicts the destruction of Skaro which has survived thanks to a larger plot played by the Dalek Prime.

== Plot ==
The story opens up with the Doctor and Sam in the TARDIS doing some maintenance when they are collected by a ship which holds an escape pod containing Davros. A group of Thals arrive; they want Davros to alter their species so they will be better able to fight the Daleks. A force of Daleks then arrive and take the Doctor and Davros, along with other characters, to Skaro. Before landing on Skaro, the Doctor discovers that the coordinates he believed were Skaro's were actually those of the planet Antalin.

Since Davros's return the Dalek Prime has met considerable resistance with a number of Davros loyalists forming. Initiating a final civil war on Skaro, the Dalek Prime has all the Davros loyalists revealed and exterminated. In the meantime he releases the Doctor to leave Skaro. The Doctor discovers a planted device on board the TARDIS which would allow the Daleks to survive in case the Dalek Prime failed. He jettisons it into the vortex.

With his faction defeated, Davros is sentenced to death by matter dispersal. Prior to his downfall he had implanted a Spider Dalek as a spy amongst the Dalek Prime's forces. Davros is placed in a disintegration chamber and his atoms dispersed. His fate is left open when his data is either erased from the disintegrator or transmatted across space to a safe location.

== Continuity ==
- The Dalek Prime states that the planet the Doctor destroyed (in Remembrance of the Daleks) was not Skaro, but Antalin. According to the Dalek Prime, the Daleks had found out about the destruction of Skaro when they found records during their invasion of Earth in the 22nd century (The Dalek Invasion of Earth). To simultaneously save their homeworld and maintain the flow of history, the Daleks reasoned that they needed to make it appear as if Skaro had been destroyed, so they terraformed Antalin to resemble Skaro and placed Davros there after altering his memories so, when revived (Destiny of the Daleks), he would believe he was on Skaro. It is also stated that the Daleks' war with the Movellans was faked to give the Daleks a plausible reason for reviving Davros.
- It is implied that the Dalek factory ship jettisoned from the TARDIS near the end of the book ends up as the capsule seen in The Power of the Daleks.
