= Tragedy Day =

1994 novel by Gareth Roberts

- Author: Gareth Roberts
- Cover artist: Jeff Cummins
- Series: Doctor Who book: Virgin New Adventures
- Release number: 24
- Subject: Featuring: Seventh Doctor; Ace, Bernice
- Publisher: Virgin Books
- Publication date: March 1994
- ISBN: 0-426-20410-7
- Preceded by: No Future
- Followed by: Legacy

Tragedy Day is an original novel written by Gareth Roberts and based on the long-running British science fiction television series Doctor Who. It features the Seventh Doctor, Ace and Bernice. A prelude to the novel, also penned by Roberts, appeared in Doctor Who Magazine #210.

== Synopsis ==
Empire City on the planet Olleril is experiencing 'Tragedy Day', where the well-off give charitably to the poor. However, this specific day has much more to offer, with murders, weaponry and plots that could destroy everything.

The Doctor, Bernice and Ace all want to leave, but have been captured by various factions within minutes of arrival.
