= Timewyrm: Apocalypse =

1991 novel by Nigel Robinson

- Author: Nigel Robinson
- Cover artist: Andrew Skilleter
- Series: Doctor Who book: Virgin New Adventures
- Release number: 3
- Subject: Featuring: Seventh Doctor; Ace
- Publisher: Virgin Books
- Publication date: October 1991
- ISBN: 0-426-20359-3
- Preceded by: Timewyrm: Exodus
- Followed by: Timewyrm: Revelation

Timewyrm: Apocalypse is an original Doctor Who novel, published by Virgin Publishing in their New Adventures range of Doctor Who novels, and is the third volume in the Timewyrm quartet. It features the Seventh Doctor and Ace, as well as brief flashbacks and a telepathic message of the Second Doctor.

== Synopsis ==
The Doctor and Ace follow the Timewyrm to the planet Kirith in the far, far future. There they find a peaceful, happy society that hides a dark secret.

== Plot ==
The Doctor and Ace track the Timewyrm to the planet Kirith in the far distant future. When they arrive, they rescue a young Kirithon man named Raphael, who has fallen into the sea. At first, Kirith seems to be a pleasant enough place filled with kind, friendly, and strikingly beautiful people. The Doctor quickly becomes suspicious.

In Kirith town, the Doctor meets a librarian named Miríl, who explains much of Kirith's background. The Kirithons were once a backward and savage species, until benevolent aliens known as the Panjistri arrived. They shared their knowledge and technology with the Kirithons, and in exchange were given an island known as Kandasi, where they could pursue their studies in private isolation. The Panjistri also provide an endless supply of nourishing food known as zavát. Miríl reveals that, despite all they have learned from the Panjistri, the Kirithons are unable to leave their planet and explore the stars. Certain areas of study were forbidden to the Kirithons by the Panjistri, space flight being one of them. The Doctor studies first the library records and then a nearby ruin before concluding that the Panjistri are lying to the Kirithons to prevent them from developing technologies that could be dangerous to the Panjistri.

Ace, meanwhile, is finding it difficult to spend time with Raphael. Revna, another Kirithon, is very possessive of Raphael and jealous of Ace. Lord Procurator Huldah, the liaison between the Panjistri and Kirithons, warns Raphael to keep away from the strangers. Nevertheless, Ace's persistence pays off. Raphael tells her he had a friend named Darien who years ago had been accepted into the Brotherhood of the Panjistri due to his amazing musical talent. No one has seen him since, and more strangely, no one except Raphael remembers him. Ace decides they should investigate Kandasi to find out what happened. Reluctantly, Raphael agrees, and they sneak aboard a ship that travels between Kandasi and the mainland. Exploring a base used by the Panjistri reveals strange biological experiments, and a huge, hideous Homunculus which is being grown in a laboratory. The Panjistri discover the intruders, and sends their vicious slaves, known as Companions, to apprehend them. Forced to split up, Raphael returns to Kirith town with Ace's backpack, while Ace takes refuge in the Darkfell, a creepy-looking forest where the Kirithons were forbidden to venture.

Ace discovers a small group of hideously disfigured people living in the Darkfell known as the Unlike. Their leader, Arun, explains to Ace that they are victims of advanced genetic experimentation who have escaped from the Panjistri. Arun reveals to Ace the secret of zavát: not only does this ubiquitous food source make the Kirithons pliable and easy to control, but it is made from the processed remains of dead Kirithons. Back in Kirith town, Raphael finds the Doctor and Miríl in the library and tells them what he and Ace had discovered. Lord Huldah arrives with four Companions to arrest the Doctor and Miríl. They try to escape, aided by Raphael, but to no avail. Deep in the heart of Kandasi, the Grand Matriarch of the Panjistri and her Companion Fetch observe the capture of the Doctor with interest. But it is really Ace that they needed...

The Unlike tell Ace that their spies had witnessed the Doctor's capture and saw him taken to the Harbours. Ace makes a bargain with them: if they will help her rescue the Doctor, the Doctor will help cure them of the radiation poisoning inflicted on them by the Panjistri. In the Harbours, the Doctor, Raphael, and Miríl are put in a prison cell with no hope of escape. Reptu, a Panjistri, arrives and informs them that the Doctor will be taken to Kandasi to see the Grand Matriarch. As Reptu leads the Doctor out of the cell, the Doctor bombards him with questions. Beyond the hearing of Raphael and Miríl, Reptu admits that the Panjistri have lied about Kirith's history and are manipulating the development of the Kirithons. They board a hovercraft for the journey across the water to Kandasi. When they arrive, Reptu's Companion knocks out the Doctor.

Raphael and Miríl remained trapped in the prison cell, until Raphael realizes that he still had Ace's backpack. He finds four canisters of Nitro-9 and sets them all off against the door of the cell, blowing it off its hinges. The explosion attracts the attention of Ace and the Unlike, who are just about to enter the Harbours in search of the Doctor. At the insistence of the Unlike, who had previously worked as genetic scientists for the Panjistri, they seek out the Homunculus. Arun insists that the creature be destroyed, but Raphael protests, arguing that the creature is a living being and should be helped. Arun and Raphael argue, with Ace in the middle, and argument awakens the Homunculus, which bursts free of its tank. As the creature rages about the room, it briefly turns toward Ace and prepares to attack her. Unthinkingly, Raphael grabs a nearby gun and kills the creature.

Ace, Raphael, Arun, and Miríl set out to reach Kandasi. They steal a boat and set out across the water to reach the mysterious island. Along the way, they are attacked by a horrible sea creature, and Miríl is killed. Meanwhile, the Doctor has a half-real, half-imagined conversation with his former self. The Second Doctor informs him that, after his first regeneration, he had briefly met and befriended a young girl named Lilith. That young girl, five thousand years later, became the Grand Matriarch of the Panjistri. When Ace and the others reach Kandasi and find the Doctor, they don't find any Panjistri. The Doctor discovers a matter transmitter tuned to preset coordinates. Using the transmat, the Doctor and company find themselves on a space station 300,000 miles above the surface of Kirith. This is Kandasi. The Doctor explains that Kirith is simply one massive genetic experiment.

The group explore Kandasi for a short time before they are met by Reptu, who explains what the Panjistri are really up to. In order to extend the life of the universe past its natural point of collapse, which is rapidly approaching, the Panjistri plan to create a single organism which has within it the sum total of all life in the universe. The one attribute their God Machine lacked was aggression, the one attribute that the Kirithons could never develop. That is why the Panjistri are developing the Homunculus. With that experiment destroyed, Ace is the next best thing. She is taken to join the Panjistri, as so many Kirithons had been over the centuries. The Doctor suddenly realizes the truth: the God Machine is a trick. The Grand Matriarch is in fact the Timewyrm, who used her control over time to hide in the Doctor's own past. She had possessed the little girl Lilith five thousand years before, and is planning to use Ace to complete her God Machine, whereby she will achieve supreme power over the universe itself. The Doctor convinces Reptu that the Grand Matriarch must be stopped.

Raphael hears the phantom sound of his old friend Darien's music, and is drawn down into the God Machine. Eager to save Ace's life, Raphael offers himself to the God Machine. Exposed as he had been to Ace's aggression, this is enough to complete it, and Raphael uses his new powers to challenge the Timewyrm herself. The Timewyrm is defeated by her own creation. Defeated, but not destroyed.
