= Conundrum (Lyons novel) =

1994 novel by Steve Lyons

- Author: Steve Lyons
- Cover artist: Jeff Cummins
- Series: Doctor Who book: Virgin New Adventures
- Release number: 22
- Subject: Featuring: Seventh Doctor; Ace, Bernice
- Publisher: Virgin Books
- Publication date: January 1994
- ISBN: 0-426-20408-5
- Preceded by: The Left-Handed Hummingbird
- Followed by: No Future

Conundrum is an original novel written by Steve Lyons and based on the long-running British science fiction television series Doctor Who. It features the Seventh Doctor, Ace and Bernice. A prelude to the novel, also penned by Lyons, appeared in Doctor Who Magazine #208. This novel is the fourth book in the "Alternate Universe cycle" which continues until No Future.

== Plot ==
What seems to be a simple murder investigation in a quiet English village becomes something far more deadly for the Seventh Doctor and his companions when the inhabitants begin to exhibit superhero abilities...
