= Mike Tucker (special effects artist) =

Welsh special effects designer and author

Mike Tucker (born in South Wales) is a Welsh special effects expert who worked for many years at the BBC Television Visual Effects Department, and now works as an Effects Supervisor for his own company, The Model Unit. He is also the author of a variety of spin-offs relating to the television series Doctor Who and novelisations based on episodes of the television series Merlin. He sometimes co-writes with Robert Perry.

== Effects work ==
Tucker's early work for the BBC was as a holiday relief assistant on the 1982 history series Timewatch. Following this, he became a full-time member of the BBC Visual Effects Department working on practical effects and models for a range of BBC programmes including Casualty, Top of the Pops, EastEnders, The Singing Detective, Proust and Tomorrow's World among many others. He was one of the principal effects crew for Red Dwarf series 1 - 7 and worked as an effects assistant on the final four series of the original Doctor Who. His association with Doctor Who continued long after the series was "rested" by the BBC, working on the Children in Need special Dimensions in Time.

He became a fully fledged effects supervisor in the early 1990s, handling the effects for shows including I Was a Rat, 999 International, Raging Planet and Twister Week. Starting to specialise in miniature effects he went on to handle model sequences for Egypt's Golden Empire, Disasters at Sea, Nelson's Island, Billy and the Fighter Boys, Hiroshima and The Brighton Bomb.

In 2005, Tucker became the first person who worked on the original series of Doctor Who to also work on the revived version starring Christopher Eccleston, as model work supervisor, work which continues to the present day. Following the closure of the BBC effects department in 2004 he set up his own company The Model Unit-based initially at Ealing Studios before moving on to Wimbledon Studios in 2012. As a result of the closure of Wimbledon Studios in 2014 the company returned to Ealing Studios once more.

The Model Unit has contributed miniature effects sequences for varied projects such as the Munich air disaster segment of BBC's Surviving Disaster series, Krakatoa - The Last Days, also for the BBC, Moonshot and Primeval for ITV, Human Body - Pushing the Limits, Clash of the Dinosaurs and Last Day of the Dinosaurs for the Discovery Channel and the feature film Atonement for Working Title Films.

On 23 November 2013 the BBC Broadcast a special 50th Anniversary episode of Doctor Who, titled "The Day of the Doctor". Mike Tucker's Model Unit was responsible for the miniature effects in the feature-length special which was broadcast on BBC One and simultaneously in many countries and up to 1500 cinemas in the UK.

== Nominations & awards ==
In May 2006, Tucker won a BAFTA Craft Award for his special effects work on the drama-documentary Hiroshima.

In July 2008 Tucker was part of the team nominated for a Primetime Emmy for Outstanding Visual Effects in a Television Series for his work on the "Strength" episode of Discovery Channel's Human Body - Pushing the Limits.

In April 2014 Mike Tucker's Model Unit won a BAFTA craft award for Doctor Who: "The Day of the Doctor", along with Milk VFX, Real SFX

He has been nominated five times for an RTS Craft Award for his work on 999 international - Missing in Action, The Brighton Bomb, Horizon - Last Flight of Columbia, Human Body - Pushing the Limits and Doctor Who - "The Day of the Doctor".

== Writing work ==
Tucker's first writing work was co-writing with Sophie Aldred the non-fiction book Ace! about the final seasons of the original Doctor Who. This was quickly followed by the short story "Question Mark Pyjamas" in the second volume of the Virgin Decalog anthology series: this was the first story that Tucker wrote with his longtime writing partner Robert Perry. This was followed by several stories for the BBC Short Trips anthology, again all co-written with Perry.

In October 1997, the first book in Tucker and Perry's self-styled Season 27 run was published as part of BBC Books' Past Doctor Adventures series. The book, Illegal Alien, was originally to be based on a script which was in consideration for production had a twenty-seventh season of Doctor Who gone ahead. Tucker and Perry continued to write their Season 27 stories, with the novels Matrix (1998), Storm Harvest (1999), Prime Time (2000, written by Tucker alone) and Loving the Alien (2003).

The fourth book in the series, Prime Time, was Tucker's first novel written without Robert Perry, and instigated an arc that continued in Dale Smith's Heritage before ending in "Loving the Alien", for which Perry returned. It sparked some small controversy amongst Doctor Who fans for stating that the Ace's last name was Gale: Ace's surname was never established on screen, but her creator Ian Briggs suggested that if one was needed then Gale should be used as he saw the character as a parallel to Dorothy Gale from The Wizard of Oz. However, the Virgin New Adventures established after the end of the original series that Ace's last name was McShane, and Tucker's change was interpreted as an attempt to remove the New Adventures from the nebulous Doctor Who canon. Tucker, however, stated that the error was due to him not having known of the McShane last name, and later books have attempted to establish that Ace's full name is Dorothy Gale McShane.

Between writing his novels, Tucker also wrote for Big Finish Productions' audio adventures, writing the audios The Genocide Machine in 1999 and Dust Breeding in 2001. Dust Breeding featured the return of the Krill, a race of aliens created for Storm Harvest, and also Bev Tarrent, a character from his previous audio. Tucker has also written for Big Finish's Bernice Summerfield and Tomorrow People range of audios.

During this period, Mike also had a brief stint as a university academic, giving multiple lectures on science fiction and other topics. Later, in 2003, Tucker and Perry also wrote the novella Companion Piece for Telos Publishing Ltd.'s range of Doctor Who books, again for the Seventh Doctor but introducing a new companion, Catherine Broome.

His Doctor Who book, The Crawling Terror, published by BBC Books, is one of the first books to feature Peter Capaldi's Doctor. His previous work for that range include the Tenth Doctor novels The Nightmare of Black Island (his first published Doctor Who book not featuring the Seventh Doctor) and Snowglobe 7. His follow up novel featuring the Twelfth Doctor was 'Diamond Dogs'. He has also contributed comic strips to the magazines Doctor Who - Battles in Time and Doctor Who Adventures.

Away from Doctor Who fiction he has novelised the Merlin episodes "Valiant", "The Labyrinth of Gedref" and "The Traitor Within" for Random House, co-authored (with Mat Irvine) the History of the BBC Visual Effects Department for Aurum Press and co-authored (with Stephen Nicholas) 'Impossible Worlds' a guide to Doctor Who concept art.

In December 2019, Big Finish Productions released the audiobook Star Cops: The Stuff of Life. Written by Tucker and based on the 1980s television series Star Cops, it bridges the gap between their first two series of audio dramas. A second audiobook - "Star Cops: Sins of the Father" - was published in December 2021.
