= Genocide (novel) =

1997 novel by Paul Leonard

- Author: Paul Leonard
- Series: Doctor Who book: Eighth Doctor Adventures
- Release number: 4
- Subject: Featuring: Eighth Doctor; Sam, Jo, UNIT
- Publisher: BBC Books
- Publication date: September 1997
- ISBN: 0-563-40572-4
- Preceded by: The Bodysnatchers
- Followed by: War of the Daleks

Genocide is an original novel written by Paul Leonard and based on the long-running British science fiction television series Doctor Who. It features the Eighth Doctor, Sam, Jo and UNIT.

== Synopsis ==
Jo Grant, a UNIT veteran, receives a call for help from an old colleague. A scientific unit is being threatened by a UNIT force led by a secretive Captain. Jo Grant ends up sucked out of time and space.

Meanwhile, the Doctor and Sam go to 2109 and find an alien race where the humans should be. To make it worse, the aliens claim to have been there for thousands of years, and something is wrong with Sam's mind.
