= Timewyrm: Genesys =

1991 novel by John Peel

- Author: John Peel
- Cover artist: Andrew Skilleter
- Series: Doctor Who book: Virgin New Adventures
- Release number: 1
- Subject: Featuring: Seventh Doctor; Ace
- Set in: Period between Survival and Timewyrm: Exodus
- Publisher: Virgin Books
- Publication date: June 1991
- Pages: 230
- ISBN: 0-426-20355-0
- Preceded by: Survival
- Followed by: Timewyrm: Exodus

Timewyrm: Genesys is an original Doctor Who novel, published by Virgin Publishing in their New Adventures range of Doctor Who novels. It was the first book in that series (and the first book in the Timewyrm quartet), and was thought of by some fans as a continuation of the television series; in effect, a Season 27 to follow the televised Season 26.

The novel featured the Seventh Doctor and Ace; it also features a brief cameo of the Fourth Doctor – in the form of a holographic message to his future self – and the Seventh Doctor briefly uses the TARDIS to summon the personality of his third incarnation when he needs his past self's technical expertise.

The book makes extensive use of characters and plot elements from the Mesopotamian myth of Gilgamesh.

== Synopsis ==
In ancient Mesopotamia the Seventh Doctor and Ace together with Gilgamesh face a mythological Gallifreyan terror – the Timewyrm.

== Plot ==
In space above the planet Earth, two spaceships fight. One, commanded by a cybernetic woman, is shot down by the other. She survives and her escape pod crash lands somewhere in ancient Mesopotamia. Gilgamesh, King of Uruk, finds the escape pod while engaged on a spying mission against Kish. The woman, who claims to be the goddess Ishtar, tries to lure Gilgamesh into helping her. Gilgamesh refuses, and Ishtar becomes enraged, vowing that she will have her revenge.

On board the TARDIS, Ace awakens to discover that she has no memory of who or where she is. The Doctor informs her that he is accidentally responsible for the removal of her memories. Before he can correct this error, the Doctor triggers a message from his own past in the form of a holographic projection of the Fourth Doctor. Recorded during the events of The Invasion of Time, the Fourth Doctor's warning concerns a mythical creature known only as the Timewyrm. After the Doctor restores Ace's memories, the TARDIS lands in ancient Mesopotamia

Back in Uruk, two noblemen, Gudea and Ennatum, plot against Gilgamesh. They send a messenger to Kish warning that Gilgamesh will be returning on a spy mission. The message is received by High Priest Dumuzi in the Temple of Ishtar, a Temple graced by the presence of its divine namesake. Agga, King of Kish, is not pleased that Ishtar had chosen to visit his city. She has ordered the construction of strange, highly intricate metal designs throughout her Temple. Agga knows that Ishtar is immensely powerful and fears for the safety of his people and his daughter, Ninani.

When Gilgamesh and his trusted Neanderthal friend Enkidu are ambushed by the Kishite guards, the TARDIS appears. The Doctor and Ace become involved in the melee, and Ace uses her Nitro-9 explosives to frighten the attackers away. Gilgamesh mistakes the strangers for the Gods Ea and Aya. The Doctor leaves Ace in a pub with Gilgamesh and Enkidu while he investigates Kish. Gilgamesh attracts unwanted attention, and, to avoid a brawl, Ace sings "The Wild Rover" to entertain the crowd. She attracts the attention of Avram, a travelling songsmith, who tells her that Ishtar is present in Kish. Ace decides to set off for the Temple of Ishtar, along with Avram, Gilgamesh, and Enkidu, certain that the Doctor will be there and will need her help.

In Kish, Princess Ninani plans to oppose the Goddess in any way she could. She sends for a young Priestess of Ishtar, En-Gula, so that she might learn more about Ishtar and find a way to fight her. En-Gula is afraid of Ishtar and joins Ninani's conspiracy. As En-Gula returns to the Temple of Ishtar, she meets the Doctor. The Doctor is surprised that Ishtar is present within her temple. The Doctor allows himself to be taken to meet the Goddess. Dumuzi drugs the Doctor into unconsciousness so that his mind can be devoured by Ishtar. At that point, Ace and her party arrive. Thinking that the Doctor is in danger, Ace throws some Nitro-9 around, causing serious damage to the Temple.

An angry Doctor explains to Ace that he was feigning unconsciousness to gather information about Ishtar. The Doctor reveals that the patterns Ishtar is having worked into the walls of the Temple are a kind of massive electronic transmitter which will allow her to control thousands of human minds over vast distances. Ace's explosives have damaged the transmitter, but it will only be a matter of time before it is repaired. The party, which now includes En-Gula and Avram, return to Uruk to plan their next move. In Uruk, they all enjoy a feast prepared in honour of Gilgamesh. Avram entertains the court with a song about a mysterious god-like being known as Utnapishtim. The Doctor believes there is more to the legend of Utnapishtim. The group decides that Gilgamesh, Ace, and Avram will seek out Utnapishtim, while the Doctor, Enkidu, and En-Gula keep an eye on Kish.

Ace's party reaches the extinct volcano where Utnapishtim is said to live. Avram, who has been there before, leads them to two "scorpion men", in reality robotic guards designed to repel intruders. Within the volcano, they reach a large lake, guarded by a single man. Gilgamesh, getting impatient, attacks the man. Ace is forced to disarm the guard of his laser gun, to avoid allowing Gilgamesh to be killed in contravention of known Earth history. The party uses a small boat to travel to the center of the lake to Utnapishtim, who resides in the remains of a vast spaceship. He explains how he had pursued Qataka, a ruthless criminal from the planet Anu, across space. He claims that Qataka had been destroyed, but that his ship had been badly damaged in the fight. He confides to Ace that his people will not be able to remain long within their wrecked ship, and that, when they venture out into the world, a destructive war with the humans will be inevitable. Ace tells Utnapishtim that Qataka was not destroyed, that she is calling herself Ishtar and is planning to take the Earth for herself. Utnapishtim agrees to help Ace destroy Qataka/Ishtar with a computer virus that will attack Ishtar's cybernetic body.

Meanwhile, the Doctor, Enkidu, and En-Gula return to Kish to consult with Ninani. The Doctor hopes Ninani can help him get into Ishtar's temple undetected. Ninani is willing to help, but they are discovered by Agga. Agga is so afraid of the punishment for his daughter's treachery against Ishtar that he confines all of them (except his daughter) to the dungeons. Agga explains to Ninani that Ishtar claims she has a device which can destroy the world. He tries to convince Ninani that they can not oppose such a powerful creature. Ninani waits for her father to leave and then sets about to rescue the others from the dungeons.

The Doctor, Enkidu, En-Gula, and Ninani return to the Temple of Ishtar, but are discovered by the Goddess, who was expecting this. As Ishtar prepares to consume the Doctor's mind, an explosion rocks the temple. Ace has returned, via a small flying craft piloted by Utnapishtim, along with Gilgamesh and Avram. The Doctor realises that Ishtar has rigged a cobalt bomb, powerful enough to destroy the planet, to explode in the event of her death. As Ace and the others attempt to destroy Ishtar, the Doctor is forced to try to save her. When Ishar attempts to consume Ace's mind, she instead downloads the computer virus that Utnapishtim had implanted within all of their minds. The Doctor explains the bomb to Utnapishtim and that they have to return to the TARDIS at once.

Back on the TARDIS, the Doctor tries to find a way to keep Ishtar's mental processes going after the virus destroys her body. Using the TARDIS telepathic circuits, the Doctor mentally summons the Third Doctor to assist with the technical aspects of the plan. The Doctor takes one of Ishtar's mental implants and wires it into the TARDIS telepathic circuits, in effect downloading Ishtar into the TARDIS, keeping her alive long enough to disarm the bomb. Unfortunately, when the Doctor tries to delete Ishtar's mind from the TARDIS circuitry, he discovers that she is no longer there. Adapting to the TARDIS, Ishtar uses its systems as a replacement body. The Doctor tricks her into moving her consciousness into the TARDIS's secondary control room, which he then jettisons into the Time Vortex, certain that the forces of the Vortex will destroy her.

The Doctor returns everyone to Mesopotamia and assists Utnapishtim in repairing his ship, making sure that the people of Anu can find an uninhabited planet to call their new home. Back in the TARDIS, the Doctor notices the Time Path Indicator is active, which means that they are being followed by another time machine. Ishtar, having assimilated TARDIS components into herself, has become the Timewyrm, and she now has the power to travel through time and space. The Doctor attempts to time ram the creature, but the Timewyrm evades his trap and escapes. Using the Time Path Indicator, the Doctor is able to track the Timewyrm to London in the 20th century, and the Doctor and Ace set out to destroy their new enemy.

== Reception ==
Due to the presence of a topless teenage prostitute in the novel, Timewyrm: Genesys was the subject of some coverage in UK tabloids.

In Bookwyrm, Anthony Wilson writes that when reading Timewyrm: Genesys, "you realise that the whole thing, setting aside, is an exercise in Doctor Who cliché. It keeps a feeling of continuity, I suppose, but it also manages not to rise above the worst of its source material."

Elizabeth Sandifer wrote in TARDIS Eruditorum that Timewyrm: Genesys is "a book whose sole claim to being for adults amounts to the fact that Gilgamesh sexually assaults everything in sight and everybody is obsessed with breasts. I'm certainly not about to suggest that the idea of a good Doctor Who story about sex is impossible, but I'm pretty willing to suggest that this isn't it."
