= St Anthony's Fire (novel) =

1994 novel by Mark Gatiss

- Author: Mark Gatiss
- Cover artist: Paul Campbell
- Series: Doctor Who book: Virgin New Adventures
- Release number: 31
- Subject: Featuring: Seventh Doctor; Ace, Bernice
- Publisher: Virgin Books
- Publication date: October 1994
- ISBN: 0-426-20423-9
- Preceded by: First Frontier
- Followed by: Falls the Shadow

St Anthony's Fire is an original novel written by Mark Gatiss, based on the long-running British science fiction television series Doctor Who. It features the Seventh Doctor, Ace and Bernice. A prelude to the novel, also written by Gatiss, appeared in Doctor Who Magazine #217.
