= Infinite Requiem =

1995 novel by Daniel Blythe

- Author: Daniel Blythe
- Cover artist: Barry Jones
- Series: Doctor Who book: Virgin New Adventures
- Release number: 36
- Subject: Featuring: Seventh Doctor; Bernice
- Publisher: Virgin Books
- Publication date: March 1995
- ISBN: 0-426-20437-9
- Preceded by: Set Piece
- Followed by: Sanctuary

Infinite Requiem is an original novel written by Daniel Blythe and based on the long-running British science fiction television series Doctor Who. It features the Seventh Doctor and Bernice. A prelude to the novel, also penned by Blythe, appeared in Doctor Who Magazine #223.
