= Falls the Shadow (novel) =

1994 novel by Daniel O'Mahony

- Author: Daniel O'Mahony
- Series: Doctor Who book: Virgin New Adventures
- Release number: 32
- Subject: Featuring: Seventh Doctor; Ace, Bernice
- Publisher: Virgin Books
- Publication date: November 1994
- ISBN: 0-426-20427-1
- Preceded by: St Anthony's Fire
- Followed by: Parasite

Falls the Shadow is an original novel written by Daniel O'Mahony and based on the long-running British science fiction television series Doctor Who. It features the Seventh Doctor, Ace and Bernice. A prelude to the novel, also penned by O'Mahony, appeared in Doctor Who Magazine #218. The title is taken from T. S. Eliot's poem The Hollow Men, a title also used, incidentally, for a Doctor Who novel. The relevant lines of the poem are quoted in the 2007 TV episode The Lazarus Experiment.
