= Brian Willis =

Australian rules footballer

Personal information
- Full name: Brian Willis
- Born: 2 January 1930
- Died: 2 September 1951 (aged 21)
- Original team: West Footscray
- Height: 187 cm (6 ft 2 in)
- Weight: 81 kg (179 lb)

Playing career^{1}
Years	Club	Games (Goals)
1951	Footscray	2 (0)
- ^{1} Playing statistics correct to the end of 1951.

Brian Willis (2 January 1930 – 2 September 1951) was a former Australian rules footballer who played with Footscray in the Victorian Football League (VFL).

Willis collapsed and died aged 21. It is believed he suffered a brain haemorrhage.

Willis played in the opening match of the season but was dropped after two games. He received a severe ankle injury playing in the reserves that kept him out of football for the rest of the season.
