= Robert Perry (writer) =

Robert Perry (born in South Wales) is a Welsh novelist and television screenwriter. He was script-editor on the BBC soap opera EastEnders, as well as writing for the television series Family Affairs and Is Harry on the Boat?. He has also worked as a storyliner on Emmerdale.

He is also known for a writing partnership with Mike Tucker on a variety of spin-offs relating to the television series Doctor Who, specifically for the character of the Seventh Doctor.

== Prose Writing ==
Perry's first writing work was the short story Question Mark Pyjamas in the second volume of the Virgin Decalog anthology series: this was the first story that Perry wrote with his long-term writing partner Mike Tucker. This was followed by several stories for the BBC Short Trips anthology, again all co-written with Tucker.

In October 1997, the first book in Tucker and Perry's self-styled Season 27 run was published as part of BBC Books' Past Doctor Adventures series. The book, Illegal Alien, was rumoured to be based on a script which was in consideration for production had a twenty-seventh season of Doctor Who gone ahead. Tucker and Perry continued to write their Season 27 stories, with the novels Matrix (1998), Storm Harvest (1999), and Loving the Alien (2003).

In 2003, Tucker and Perry also wrote the novella Companion Piece for Telos Publishing Ltd.'s range of Doctor Who novellas, introducing a new companion, Catherine Broome.
