= Daniel Blythe =

British author

- Born: 1969; Maidstone
- Occupation: Author

Daniel Blythe (born 1969 in Maidstone) is a British author, who studied Modern Languages at St John's College, Oxford. After several years writing stories for the small press, Blythe began his professional career writing for the Virgin New Adventures series of Doctor Who novels, for which he wrote the novels The Dimension Riders (1993) and Infinite Requiem (1995) and very soon moved on to have his own original work published.

In 1998, Penguin Books published Blythe's literary thriller The Cut, the controversial story of a young woman's alienation manifesting itself in crime and violence. The Cut was followed by Losing Faith, a dark mystery in which an unnamed narrator tries to discover the truth behind his mercurial girlfriend's death. Blythe's work brought him critical acclaim from such diverse sources as The Times, which described him as 'a sharp, observant, energetic writer with a nimble sense of language', New Woman magazine, which called him 'definitely an author to be watched', and Maxim magazine, which made The Cut one of its 'Books of the Month'.

Subsequently, Blythe branched out into non-fiction with 2002's The Encyclopaedia Of Classic Eighties Pop, a humorous reference guide published by Allison & Busby, which led to a stint co-presenting the music show 80s Night on BBC Local Radio in the North of England. In 2004 The Encyclopaedia Of Classic Eighties Pop was re-issued in an updated and revised paperback edition.

Dadlands, an alternative handbook aimed at new fathers and based on Blythe's experiences of being a parent, came out in 2005 with John Wiley & Sons, while I Hate Christmas was published by Allison & Busby.

Daniel Blythe's new novel This Is The Day was published in 2007. His Doctor Who novel Autonomy was published in August 2009.

He also penned the book Shadow Runners.
