= Timewyrm: Exodus =

1991 novel by Terrance Dicks

- Author: Terrance Dicks
- Cover artist: Andrew Skilleter
- Series: Doctor Who book: Virgin New Adventures
- Release number: 2
- Subject: Featuring: Seventh Doctor; Ace
- Publisher: Virgin Books
- Publication date: August 1991
- ISBN: 0-426-20357-7
- Preceded by: Timewyrm: Genesys
- Followed by: Timewyrm: Apocalypse

Timewyrm: Exodus is an original Doctor Who novel, published by Virgin Publishing in their New Adventures range of Doctor Who novels. It is a sequel to author Terrance Dicks' 1969 Second Doctor story The War Games as well as the second part of the ongoing four novel Timewyrm narrative.

== Synopsis ==
The Doctor and Ace arrive in London 1951, but discover that somehow the Nazis have won the war. They must travel back into the history of Adolf Hitler and the Nazi party to ensure that history is restored to its proper course.

== Plot ==
After escaping from a trap devised by the Doctor, the Timewyrm sets about plotting her revenge. She decides to use the Earth against the Doctor, and travels forward in history until she finds a moment where human technology reached the point where global devastation was possible. She also needed a living vessel to execute her plans, and soon finds a bitter, neurotic madman filled with hate and resentment. But as soon as the Timewyrm enters the chosen mind, she became trapped within it.

The TARDIS follows the Timewyrm's course through time, and arrives in 1951 London, at the Festival of Britain. The Doctor and Ace set out to find the Timewyrm, but quickly notice that something is different – the Nazis have won World War II. Overheard by a local Nazi informant, the Doctor and Ace are arrested by the British Free Corps for making seditious, anti-Nazi statements. They are put under the charge of Lieutenant Hemmings.

The Doctor decides that they must return to the TARDIS and track down the source of the changes to history. After calmly enduring some Nazi psychological interrogation techniques, the Doctor tricks Hemmings into allowing them to escape, but the TARDIS was gone, taken by the British Free Corps. The Doctor decided to impersonate a high-ranking Nazi official (previously murdered by the British resistance, and found by the Doctor and Ace) to ingratiate himself with the Nazis. He and Ace walk into the office of Nazi General Strasser and convince him that the Doctor was conducting a secret investigation into Nazi security.

The Doctor uses his freedom and influence to visit the war archives, housed in the former British Museum, hoping to pinpoint where history diverged. While there, he comes into brief psychic contact with the Timewyrm. However, the Doctor was not sure that she was really behind the revised timeline, as it seems too subtle and precise for her. Meanwhile, Ace makes contact with the British resistance to find out more about what happened during World War II. She learns of rumours of a Black Coven, a cult of mystics who were using supernatural powers to assist the Reich.

Though their cover is eventually exposed, the Doctor and Ace manage to evade Hemmings and get back to the TARDIS. Before they leave 1951, Ace catches a glimpse of Hemmings entering something that looked like the Doctor's TARDIS, which disappeared with the same familiar TARDIS sound.

The TARDIS arrives in 1923, where the Doctor and Ace witness a failed demonstration by the young and disorganised Nazi Party on the War Office in Berlin. The police break up the demonstration, injuring a young Adolf Hitler. The Doctor rushes to Hitler's aid, resets his dislocated shoulder, and tells him that one day he will rule Germany. The Doctor asks that Hitler remember him when that day comes. As they are returning to the TARDIS, a shadowy figure in dark clothes approaches the Doctor, clearly recognising him, and attempts to kill him with some sort of laser gun. Thanks to a bit more nitro-nine-a, Ace helps the Doctor escape from his would-be assassin.

Travelling forward to 1939, the Doctor and Ace witness another Nazi rally, this time in Nuremberg, which is far, far larger. Hitler is now ruling Germany, as the Doctor promised. As Ace listens to Hitler's speech, she realised that his words are having a hypnotic effect even on her. The Doctor suspects that his speech was being boosted somehow, using technology that should not exist in 1939. The Doctor and Ace ingratiate themselves once again with Hitler, and are treated as honoured guests. Later that night, Hitler and the Doctor discuss the impending war, when Hitler suddenly bursts into an uncontrollable rage. He threatens not only to destroy his enemies throughout Europe, but also to destroy the entire planet, the galaxy, and the universe itself. Later, the Doctor tells Ace that he believes the Timewyrm is trapped within Hitler's mind, providing him with knowledge but unable to exercise any real control.

The following day, the invasion of Poland begins. The Doctor is with Hitler and his inner circle, waiting to receive the United Kingdom's official response to the invasion. Hitler is confident that the British will stop short of declaring war, but the Doctor advises him otherwise. When the Doctor turns out to be correct, Hitler goes into another rage, from which the Doctor manages to calm him. Meanwhile, Ace receives a letter intended for the Doctor asking him to meet with a Dr. Kriegslieter of the Aryan Research Bureau. Thinking this meeting might reveal information useful to the Doctor, Ace goes in his place.

While the Doctor has clandestine meetings first with Goering, then with Himmler, both involving the state of Hitler's mental health, Ace walks into a trap set for the Doctor. Ace is transported somehow to a castle in Drachensburg and held in a dungeon. When the Doctor extricates himself from the political intrigue surrounding Hitler, he finds a note left by Ace. Fearing the worst, he follows her path to the Berlin office of the Aryan Research Bureau, where he finds a crystal ball that showing an image of Ace being shackled to a dungeon wall and threatened menacingly with a knife. The Doctor finds a transport device linking the offices in Berlin with the castle in Drachensberg, using the device to go after Ace.

In Drachensberg, the Doctor is introduced to the mysterious Dr. Kriegslieter, a hideously misshapen man. Kriegslieter turns out to be the War Chief, a renegade Time Lord the Doctor had faced long ago (see The War Games), the deformities being a result of a botched regeneration. Once again, the War Chief was working with the War Lords to develop a superior race of soldiers from Earth's history. They had been amplifying Hitler's natural leadership abilities to manipulate World War II. They would make sure Hitler avoided his major mistakes (such as the delay at Dunkirk and the opening of the second front against the Soviet Union), and with the aid of a nuclear reactor in the basement, see to it that Nazi Germany takes over the world, and eventually, beyond. Ace would be sacrificed according to ancient mystical rites invented by the War Chief to amuse the gullible Himmler, whose SS were loyal to the War Chief.

When Himmler arrives for the ceremony, the Doctor attempts to expose the War Chief as a traitor to the Reich, but to no avail. As the ritual sacrifice proceeds, the Doctor appeals to Himmler to allow him to perform the sacrifice personally, arguing that the ritual would have more meaning if he were to personally sacrifice this young woman whom Himmler believed was his niece. The Doctor uses the sacrificial knife to cut Ace's bonds, and uses Ace's last nitro-nine-a capsule to give escape to the top of the castle's tower. Outside, Goering has arrived with a panzer division, advancing against Drachensberg. The Doctor explains that he had told Goering that treachery against Hitler was taking place at the castle. The War Chief's zombified soldiers are unable to repel Goering. As the battle concludes, Hitler arrives by aeroplane. The Doctor explains to Hitler that Kriegslieter was behind everything, while also convincing him that both Himmler and Goering are loyal heroes of the Reich. Hitler thanks the Doctor again for his service, then states that, with the Doctor's assistance, he has learned to tame the Timewyrm within him and draw on her immense power as his own. The Doctor realises with horror that he had given Hitler the emotional control necessary to win the war.

After Hitler and the others leave, the War Chief rises from the battlefield. At his command, all of the apparently dead SS soldiers rise as well. The Doctor and Ace run back into the castle and bolt the door. While Ace holds the zombies off with grenades, the Doctor runs to basement to set the nuclear reactor to overload. The Doctor and Ace then return to the top of the tower, where the Doctor produces a small device that brings the TARDIS to them, and they make their escape. The reactor explodes, triggering the War Chief's regeneration, but destroying his zombie soldiers.

Back in the TARDIS, the Doctor devises a plan to deal with Hitler and the Timewyrm. Consulting a World War II almanac, the Doctor picks the precise time, May 1940. and place, codenamed Felsennest, for their confrontation. There, armed only with a lantern, the Doctor confronts Hitler. He tells Hitler that Hitler alone is in charge, and that the Timewyrm was nothing compared to his greatness. This has the desired effect, luring the Timewyrm out into the open. The Doctor offers to allow the Timewyrm to take over his mind if she releases Hitler. The Timewyrm accepts, but the Doctor's lantern was really an extension of the TARDIS forcefield which he uses to repel the Timewyrm. Hitler becomes confused, suddenly robbed of his power and confidence. The Doctor persuades him to halt the advance on Dunkirk and delay the invasion of Britain, and the historical course of the war is maintained.

Back in the TARDIS, Ace celebrates their success, but the Doctor blames himself for freeing the Timewyrm from the mortal trap of Hitler's mind, but instead she is free to roam the universe. To console him, Ace suggests that they return to 1951 to see the real Festival of Britain. When they arrive, everything is back to normal.

Somewhere in the universe of time and space, the Timewyrm congratulates Lieutenant Hemmings on his progress, and promises him that he will soon have his revenge upon Ace and the Doctor.

== See also ==
- Hypothetical Axis victory in World War II This page includes an extensive list of other Wikipedia articles regarding works of Nazi Germany/Axis/World War II alternate history.
