= The Gallifrey Chronicles (Peel book) =

- Author: John Peel
- Series: Doctor Who book
- Publisher: Virgin Publishing
- Publication date: 1991
- Pages: 138
- ISBN: 1-85227-329-1

The Gallifrey Chronicles is a book related to the long-running British science fiction television series Doctor Who. Written by John Peel, The Gallifrey Chronicles is an exploration of the fictional history of the planet Gallifrey as revealed in the television series. It was published by Virgin Publishing in 1991.

The Gallifrey Chronicles is a guide to the history, culture and technology of the planet Gallifrey, original home of the Doctor. It contains accounts of Gallifrey and the Time Lords as revealed in the television programme, speculative essays on subjects such as the mechanism of regeneration and the intelligence of the TARDIS, and The Black Scrolls of Rassilon, a fictional account of Rassilon's rise to power and the earliest days of the Time Lords.

The cover art is by Andrew Skilleter who has illustrated several Doctor Who book covers.

== Publisher's summary ==
The planet Gallifrey: cradle of the most ancient civilization in our galaxy, source of the technology that mastered both space and time, home of the people who call themselves the Time Lords — and the origin of the mysterious, quirky, itinerant time-traveller known as the Doctor. When the British Broadcasting Corporation transmitted the first episode of Doctor Who in 1963, no one could have predicted that the programme's popularity would ensure its survival for twenty-eight record-breaking years.

In that first story we learnt only that the Doctor and his granddaughter Susan had left their home planet, under something of a cloud, in a remarkable time-travelling craft called the TARDIS that looked — at least on the outside — like a police telephone box.

The Doctor and the TARDIS have remained the constant elements in a television saga that has seen many changes over the decades. As the years passed we learnt more and more about the Doctor's background, about other Time Lords, and about Gallifrey.

John Peel has researched every DOCTOR WHO story ever shown on television to bring together all the facts about Gallifrey and the Time Lords. The result — illustrated throughout with photographs from the BBC archives — is a comprehensive guide to the foundations of the entire DOCTOR WHO Universe, and provides insight into the most comprehensive science fiction mythos that television has ever produced.
