= John Peel (writer) =

British writer (born 1954)

- Born: John Ronald Peel; 1954 (age 71–72); Nottingham, Nottinghamshire, England, United Kingdom
- Citizenship: British/American
- Education: Carlton le Willows Grammar School
- Alma mater: University of Nottingham
- Occupation: Writer
- Writing career
- Pen name: Nicholas Adams; Rick North; J.P. Trent; John Vincent
- Language: English
- Genres: Science fiction Horror; Fantasy; Spy fiction
- Subject: Science fiction television
- Notable works: Timewyrm: Genesys (1991); Evolution (1994); War of the Daleks (1997); Legacy of the Daleks (1998); Diadem (1997–2012)

John Ronald Peel (born 1954) is a British writer, best known for his TV series tie-in novels and novelisations. He has written under several pseudonyms, including "John Vincent" and "Nicholas Adams". He lives in Long Island, New York. While his wife is a US citizen, Peel continues to travel under a British passport.

== Career ==
During the 1980s, Peel wrote a licensed spin-off novel based on the popular 1960s TV series The Avengers, titled Too Many Targets. He is also known for his various books based on Doctor Who, Star Trek and James Bond Jr. (written as "John Vincent").

=== Doctor Who books ===
A friend of the television writer Terry Nation, Peel wrote novelisations of several Doctor Who stories for Target Books featuring Nation's Daleks; he is reportedly one of the few writers to have been willing to do so, given the high percentage of the author's fee that Nation's agents demanded for the rights to use the Daleks. For similar reasons, Peel is one of the few novelists to have used the Daleks in full-length, original Doctor Who novels, examples of which include War of the Daleks (1997) and Legacy of the Daleks (1998), written for the BBC Books Eighth Doctor Adventures range. Neither novel was especially well received by fans of the series, in part due to Peel's re-writing of Dalek history as depicted in the TV series (in particular the destruction of Skaro in the 1988 serial Remembrance of the Daleks), to bring their story more into line with Nation's vision.

With the publication of Timewyrm: Genesys (1991), Peel became the first author to write a full-length Doctor Who novel, featuring the Doctor, not to be based on either a TV or radio script. He had been selected by editor Peter Darvill-Evans to launch the Virgin New Adventures range, to resume the story of the Doctor's travels from where the now-cancelled TV series had left off. He also wrote Evolution (1994) for their sister range, Missing Adventures (featuring previous Doctors and companions), and also The Gallifrey Chronicles (1991, not to be confused with the Eighth Doctor Adventures book), a compendium of the history of the Doctor's planet, Gallifrey.

== Select bibliography ==
- Maniac
- Poison
- Shattered
- Talons
- The Mystery Files of Shelby Woo: Hot Rock
- The Secret of Dragonhome
- The Secret World of Alex Mack: I Spy, Lost in Vegas
- The Young Astronauts: Ready for Blastoff! (as "Rick North")
- Freedom's Fire (as "J.P. Trent")

=== Are You Afraid of the Dark? series ===
- The Tale of the Sinister Statues
- The Tale of the Restless House
- The Tale of the Zero Hero
- The Tale of the Three Wishes

=== Carmen Sandiego series ===
All published by Western Publishing.

- Where in America is Carmen Sandiego?
- Where in America's Past is Carmen Sandiego?
- Where in Europe is Carmen Sandiego?
- Where in Space is Carmen Sandiego?
- Where in the World is Carmen Sandiego?
- Where in the USA is Carmen Sandiego?
- Where in the USA is Carmen Sandiego, Part II?
- Where in Time is Carmen Sandiego?
- Where in Time is Carmen Sandiego, Part II?

=== Diadem series ===
The first six books were originally published by Apple. After the cancellation of the series by Apple, they were re-printed by Llewellyn Publications between 2004 and 2005. Books seven through ten were published directly by Llewellyn. Books eleven and twelve were only published in a one-volume edition, by Dragonhome Books, in 2012.

Also published in French by AdA Éditions, under the title Les mondes de la magie du Diadème.

- Book of Names (August 1997, Paperback ISBN 0-590-05947-5, Re-print ISBN 0-7387-0617-5)
- Book of Signs (August 1997, Paperback ISBN 0-590-05948-3, Re-print ISBN 0-7387-0616-7)
- Book of Magic (August 1997, Paperback ISBN 0-590-05949-1, Re-print ISBN 0-7387-0615-9)
- Book of Thunder (Hardback ISBN 0-590-05950-5, Re-print ISBN 0-7387-0614-0)
- Book of Earth (February 1998, Paperback ISBN 0-590-14965-2, Re-print ISBN 0-7387-0613-2)
- Book of Nightmares (April 1998, Paperback ISBN 0-590-14966-0, Re-print ISBN 0-7387-0612-4)
- Book of War (May 2005, ISBN 0-7387-0611-6)
- Book of Oceans (September 2005, ISBN 0-7387-0748-1)
- Book of Reality (February 2006, ISBN 0-7387-0843-7)
- Book of Doom (June 2006, ISBN 0-7387-0842-9)
- Book of Time & Book of Games (November 2012, ISBN 978-0615726007)

=== Doctor Who series ===
- The Chase
- The Daleks' Master Plan, Part I: Mission to the Unknown
- The Daleks' Master Plan, Part II: The Mutation of Time
- The Power of the Daleks
- The Evil of the Daleks
- War of the Daleks
- Legacy of the Daleks
- The Gallifrey Chronicles
- Evolution
- Timewyrm: Genesys

=== Dragonhome Series ===
- The Secret of Dragonhome (1998)
- The Slayers of Dragonhome
- The Siege Of Dragonhome

=== Eerie, Indiana series ===
- Eerie, Indiana: Bureau of Lost (ISBN 0-380-79775-5)
- Eerie, Indiana: Simon and Marshall's Excellent Adventure (ISBN 0-380-79777-1)

=== James Bond, Jr. series ===
All published by Puffin Books in 1992 under the pen name "John Vincent".

- A View to a Thrill
- The Eiffel Target
- Sandblast
- Live And Let's Dance
- Sword of Death
- High Stakes

=== Shockers series ===
Published by Grosset & Dunlap.

- Shockers: Alien Prey
- Shockers: Blood Wolf
- Shockers: Dead End
- Shockers: Ghost Lake
- Shockers: Grave Doubts
- Shockers: Night Wings

=== Star Trek: The Next Generation series ===
- Here There Be Dragons (1993)
- The Death of Princes (1997)

=== Star Trek: Deep Space Nine, Young Adult series ===
- Prisoners of Peace (1994)
- Field Trip (1995)

=== Star Trek: Deep Space Nine series ===
- Objective: Bajor (May 1996, ISBN 0-671-56811-6)

=== Star Wars Journal series ===
- Star Wars Journal: The Fight for Justice (1998)

=== Tombstones series ===
Published by Pocket Books in 1995.

- Dances With Werewolves
- The Last Drop

=== 2099 series ===
- Doomsday (September 1999, ISBN 0-439-06030-3)
- Betrayal (November 1999, ISBN 0-439-06031-1)
- Traitor (January 2000, ISBN 0-439-06032-X)
- Revolution (March 2000, ISBN 0-439-06033-8)
- Meltdown (May 2000, ISBN 0-439-06034-6)
- Firestorm (July 2000, ISBN 0-439-06035-4)

=== Written as "Nicholas Adams" ===
All published by HarperCollins. "Nicholas Adams" is also the pen name for Debra Doyle and James D. Macdonald.

- I.O.U. (1991)
- Santa Claws (1991)
- Horrorscope (1992, ISBN 0-06-106109-3)

== Comics ==
Peel has written Doctor Who comic strips for Doctor Who Monthly:

- Doctor Who (art by John Stokes):
  - "Devil of the Deep" (Doctor Who Monthly #61)
  - "The Fires Down Below" (Doctor Who Monthly #67)
