= No Future (novel) =

1994 novel by Paul Cornell

- Author: Paul Cornell
- Cover artist: Pete Wallbank
- Series: Doctor Who book: Virgin New Adventures
- Release number: 23
- Subject: Featuring: Seventh Doctor; Ace, Bernice
- Publisher: Virgin Books
- Publication date: February 1994
- ISBN: 0-426-20409-3
- Preceded by: Conundrum
- Followed by: Tragedy Day

No Future is an original novel written by Paul Cornell and based on the long-running British science fiction television series Doctor Who. It features the Seventh Doctor, Ace and Bernice. A prelude to the novel, also by Cornell, appeared in Doctor Who Magazine #209. This novel is the conclusion to the "Alternate Universe cycle".

The title is a reference to the Sex Pistols song "God Save The Queen".

== Plot ==
In London, while Bernice becomes lead singer in a punk band, the Doctor must face more than one old enemy.
