= Doctor Who season 26 =

1989 season of British sci-fi TV series

Doctor Who
- Season 26
- Cover art of the Blu-ray release for the complete season
- Starring: Sylvester McCoy; Sophie Aldred
- No. of stories: 4
- No. of episodes: 14

Release
- Original network: BBC1
- Original release: 6 September – 6 December 1989

Season chronology
- ← Previous; Season 25 Next → Doctor Who (film); Series 1 (series)

The 26th season of Doctor Who premiered on 6 September 1989 with the serial Battlefield, and consisted of four serials, ending with Survival, which was the final episode of Doctor Who for over 15 years, until the show was revived in 2005. John Nathan-Turner produced the series, with Andrew Cartmel script editing.

== Development ==
=== Scrapped stories ===
Multiple stories were scrapped from this season. This included Alixion, a three-part story written by Robin Mukherjee, was considered for season 26 as the "spare" script if another planned was no longer suitable. It was to take place on a monastic planet inhabited by humans and large beetles. The humans were monks who produced a special elixir that enhanced intelligence from beetles who fed on intelligent beings. The abbot wants to feed the Doctor to the beetles to produce a more potent elixir for himself. The script was not completed beyond a partial storyline; Mukherjee was unsure how events would have been resolved beyond a contest of wills between the Doctor and the abbot. Mukherjee would have been the first person of colour to write for the programme, had it been commissioned; eventually, Malorie Blackman would achieve this, 29 years later, with Rosa for Series 11. Mukherjee would later adapt this story for Big Finish's Lost Stories range.

Another scrapped story was Avatar, a four-part story written by David A. McIntee. It would have been a Lovecraftian horror story set in Arkham, New England (Later Cornwall) in 1927, which would have involved alien body-snatchers who could only inhabit the bodies of the dead, with one attempting to clone the body of a Silurian god to use as a body to inhabit. Illegal Alien by Mike Tucker and Robert Perry was also scrapped, which would have been a three-part Cybermen story set in war-torn 1940s London. Tucker and Perry had completed the first two episodes in script form and the final episode as a storyline which they were planning to submit at the start of season-26 production. Aaranovitch suggested the script be put to next season due to similarities with The Curse of Fenric, though this never came about to the show's cancellation. Tucker and Perry would later turn the story into a 1997 novel for the Past Doctor Adventures range from BBC Books.

Multiple stories written by Marc Platt were scrapped, such as Lungbarrow, which would have featured the Doctor and Ace visiting his ancestral home on Gallifrey; it would later be adapted into a novel of the same name. Another, Shrine, was discussed with script editor Andrew Cartmel which would have been about stone-headed aliens looking for their god-king in 19th-century Tsarist Russia.

== Casting ==
=== Main cast ===
- Sylvester McCoy as the Seventh Doctor
- Sophie Aldred as Ace

Sylvester McCoy and Sophie Aldred both continue their roles as the Seventh Doctor and Ace for their final season.

=== Recurring stars ===
- Nicholas Courtney as Brigadier Lethbridge-Stewart
- Anthony Ainley as the Master

Nicholas Courtney returned to play Brigadier Lethbridge-Stewart in Battlefield. He first appeared with the Second Doctor in 1968 in The Web of Fear before becoming a recurring character throughout the Second Doctor to the Fifth Doctor and last appearing in "The Five Doctors" (1983).

Anthony Ainley returned to play The Master in Survival, having last appeared in The Trial of a Time Lord (1986). This was Ainley's final television appearance in the role, though he portrayed the Master one last time in the 1997 computer game Destiny of the Doctors.

=== Guest stars ===
Jean Marsh, who had portrayed Joanna in The Crusade (1965) and Sara Kingdom in The Daleks' Master Plan (1965–66), appeared in Battlefield playing the part of the main antagonist.

== Serials ==
Season 26 continued Andrew Cartmel's trend of bringing a darker and more mysterious tone to the show, with a particular focus on Ace's past and the Doctor's manipulative nature. The season aired on Wednesdays, as per the previous season's schedule.

No. story	No. in season	Serial title	Episode titles	Directed by	Written by	Original release date	Prod. code	UK viewers (millions)	AI
152	1	Battlefield	"Part One"	Michael Kerrigan	Ben Aaronovitch	6 September 1989	7N	3.1	69
152	1	Battlefield	"Part Two"	Michael Kerrigan	Ben Aaronovitch	13 September 1989	7N	3.9	68
152	1	Battlefield	"Part Three"	Michael Kerrigan	Ben Aaronovitch	20 September 1989	7N	3.6	67
152	1	Battlefield	"Part Four"	Michael Kerrigan	Ben Aaronovitch	27 September 1989	7N	4.0	65
The Doctor and Ace discover that a UNIT platoon has come under assault whilst transporting a nuclear warhead. The attackers are knights from another dimension led by the legendary sorceress Morgaine, half-sister of King Arthur, whose magical powers appear to be real. The Doctor learns that one of his future incarnations will become Merlin, and bury Arthur beneath the waters of a nearby lake. With Brigadier Lethbridge-Stewart at his side one last time, the Doctor must confront Morgaine, who has summoned a demonic entity known as the Destroyer of Worlds.
153	2	Ghost Light	"Part One"	Alan Wareing	Marc Platt	4 October 1989	7Q	4.2	68
153	2	Ghost Light	"Part Two"	Alan Wareing	Marc Platt	11 October 1989	7Q	4.0	68
153	2	Ghost Light	"Part Three"	Alan Wareing	Marc Platt	18 October 1989	7Q	4.0	64
The Doctor takes Ace back to 1883 to a Perivale house called Gabriel Chase which Ace recognises. Josiah Smith, an alien who has spent millennia adapting to humanity, intends to assassinate Queen Victoria and seize the British throne. Meanwhile, buried in the basement is Smith's former master – a powerful entity who intends to halt all evolution on Earth.
154	3	The Curse of Fenric	"Part One"	Nicholas Mallett	Ian Briggs	25 October 1989	7M	4.3	67
154	3	The Curse of Fenric	"Part Two"	Nicholas Mallett	Ian Briggs	1 November 1989	7M	4.0	68
154	3	The Curse of Fenric	"Part Three"	Nicholas Mallett	Ian Briggs	8 November 1989	7M	4.0	68
154	3	The Curse of Fenric	"Part Four"	Nicholas Mallett	Ian Briggs	15 November 1989	7M	4.2	68
The Doctor and Ace land in England during World War II, at a secret seaside base which houses the Ultima Machine, a powerful codebreaking device. But disturbances plague the installation: Russians are trying to steal the Ultima, mysterious Viking runes are found in a church crypt, and vampiric Haemovores are rising from the ocean. The Doctor discovers his ancient foe, Fenric, has manipulated events in order to gain his freedom. And central to Fenric's schemes is none other than Ace.
155	4	Survival	"Part One"	Alan Wareing	Rona Munro	22 November 1989	7P	5.0	69
155	4	Survival	"Part Two"	Alan Wareing	Rona Munro	29 November 1989	7P	4.8	69
155	4	Survival	"Part Three"	Alan Wareing	Rona Munro	6 December 1989	7P	5.0	71
The Seventh Doctor brings Ace back home to Perivale. Ace becomes worried because her friends seem to have disappeared. The Doctor and a fitness instructor called Paterson are suddenly teleported, and the Doctor is confronted by the Master, who explains that they are on a sentient planet which has the power to transform the inhabitants into Cheetahs. The Master shows signs of transformation. Ace finds her friends Shreela and Midge, but a Cheetah pack attacks; Midge kills one Cheetah while Ace injures another, called Karra. She begins to form an attachment to Karra. Ace's eyes change and she begins to transform into a Cheetah. Midge begins to transform, and The Master uses him to teleport both of them back; Ace helps the Doctor and others get back. Paterson is killed by Midge and the Master, and then Midge is killed in the Master's machinations; he also kills Karra, whose presence had been comforting Ace's continued transformation. The Master teleports himself back along with the Doctor, but the Doctor resists and turns away from violence, and is transported away. The Doctor has gone back to the TARDIS and finds Ace, whose metamorphosis has reversed.

== Broadcast ==
The entire season was broadcast from 6 September to 6 December 1989. The Curse of Fenric was originally intended to be aired before Ghost Light, but was subsequently rescheduled.

== Home media ==
=== VHS releases ===
Season	Story no.	Serial name	Duration	Release date		
Season	Story no.	Serial name	Duration	UK	Australia	USA / Canada
26	152	Battlefield	4 × 25 min.	March 1998	October 1998	March 1998
26	153	Ghost Light	3 × 25 min.	May 1994	July 1994	June 1996
26	154	The Curse of Fenric	4 × 25 min.	February 1991	July 1991	January 1992
26	155	Survival	3 × 25 min.	October 1995	November 1996	September 1996

=== DVD and Blu-ray releases ===
All releases are for DVD unless otherwise indicated:

- ^{(B)} indicates a Blu-ray release

Season	Story no.	Serial name	Duration	Release date		
Season	Story no.	Serial name	Duration	R2	R4	R1
26	152	Battlefield	1 × 96 min.	26 December 2008	19 March 2009	5 May 2009
26	153	Ghost Light	3 × 25 min.	20 September 2004	3 February 2005	7 June 2005
26	154	The Curse of Fenric	1 × 104 min.	6 October 2003	11 February 2004	1 June 2004
26	155	Survival	3 × 25 min.	16 April 2007	6 June 2007	14 August 2007
26	152–155	Complete Season 26 (Note: Released as Doctor Who: The Collection – Season 26 in Region B. Released as Doctor Who – Sylvester McCoy: Complete Season Three in Region A.)	14 × 25 min. 8 × 30 min. 1 × 96 min. 1 × 104 min.	27 January 2020 ^{(B)}	11 March 2020 ^{(B)}	24 March 2020 ^{(B)}

== In print ==
Season	Story no.	Library no. (Note: Number in Target's Doctor Who Library, if applicable)	Novelisation title	Author	Paperback release date (Note: Published by Target Books (or by BBC Books under the Target Collection umbrella) unless otherwise indicated)	Audiobook	
Season	Story no.	Library no.	Novelisation title	Author	Paperback release date	Release date (Note: Unabridged from BBC Audio / AudioGo unless otherwise indicated)	Narrator
26	152	152	Battlefield	Marc Platt	18 July 1991	5 May 2022	Toby Longworth
26	153	149	Ghost Light	Marc Platt	20 September 1990	2 June 2011	Ian Hogg
26	154	151	The Curse of Fenric	Ian Briggs	15 November 1990	3 September 2015	Terry Molloy
26	155	150	Survival	Rona Munro	18 October 1990	7 September 2017	Lisa Bowerman

== Cancellation and scrapped revivals ==
=== Cancellation and scrapped Season 27 ===
Following the airing of this season, Doctor Who was cancelled. Alan Kistler, writing in Doctor Who: A History, stated that the show had been losing popularity and viewing figures for sometime for a number of reasons, such as Star Trek: The Next Generation's popularity and depth compared to Doctor Who, as well as due to the BBC shifting McCoy's era of the show from its old Saturday evening time slot and placing it opposite popular ITV show Coronation Street, with the latter being seen as an indication that the BBC had "lost faith" in the show. McCoy also attributed the lower figures to a lack of advertising from the BBC, who believed they had a desire to set up the show for cancellation.

Midway through 1989, Doctor Who's production team began initial planning for Season 27, which would have aired at the end of 1990. Andrew Cartmel and the writers he had worked with regularly, including Ben Aaronovitch, Ian Briggs, and Marc Platt, brainstormed possible story ideas. One of the major proposed plot points for Season 27 was the departure of Ace, who would have been taken to Gallifrey to become a Time Lord herself. This would also have seen the subsequent introduction of a new companion, planned as an "aristocratic cat burglar" named Raine Creevy. The cancellation of the series meant that no detailed work was undertaken beyond a few initial ideas.

Scrapped concepts included Bad Destination, a three-part story by Aaranovitch which would have been a space opera with a race of samurai insect-like aliens called the Metatraxi; Thin Ice, which would have been a four-part story by Platt featuring the Ice Warriors in 1968 London, where Ace would have left for the Prydonian Academy to become a Time Lord and a recurring character with connections to the underworld would have been introduced; Action at a Distance, written by Cartmel, which was planned to introduce Creevy and expand on the underworld character; Blood and Iron, also by Cartmel, where the Seventh Doctor would have regenerated; Hostage, a three part story by Neil Penswick where soldiers are hunting down a pair of shape-shifting criminals; Night Thoughts, set in an isolated house where a group of university staff are trapped, with one secretly being a murderer; and A School for Glory, written by Tony Etchells and another writer set during World War I with a story divided between the trenches and a British country house doubling as an army academy.

=== Attempted revivals ===
The cancellation of Doctor Who resulted in a period dubbed by fans as "The Wilderness Years". During this period, the show did not air, though many pieces of spin-off material were released. The Seventh Doctor and Ace's adventures continued in other spin-off media throughout the 1990s, such as via Doctor Who Magazine's comic strips and Virgin Publishing's Doctor Who novels. Both McCoy and Aldred would later reprise their roles for Big Finish Productions' audio drama ranges.

One scrapped revival was Lost in the Dark Dimension. Proposed by Alan Yentob of BBC2, the movie was intended to be a direct to DVD release that would have commemorated the show's 30th anniversary. The story was planned to feature the Fourth Doctor, portrayed by Tom Baker, whose regeneration to his next incarnation was halted by an evil villain. This story was also planned to feature Brigadier Lethbridge-Stewart and Ace as they worked to restore the timeline to its proper state. However, due to an ongoing film proposal by Philip Segal, the BBC ended up scrapping Lost in the Dark Dimension, instead producing Dimensions in Time, a fifteen minute charity special, to celebrate the anniversary.

Discussions for a film based on the series started in the late 1980s and carried on into the 1990s. Company Green Light, owned by Daltenreys, was planned to make a film, though progress was slow and the rights eventually relapsed to the BBC in 1994. They later partnered with French company Lumiere Productions to produce the film. Simultaneously, another proposal, headed by Amblin Entertainment and Philip Segal for an American produced Doctor Who television series, was being discussed. Lumiere would later leave Green Light after they believed Amblin's efforts would undermine interest in their film. Green Light's rights eventually reverted back to the BBC, and Segal's deal would fall through. However, Segal would eventually come into contact with Yentob, and the pair struck a deal to develop a BBC-Amblin co-production of the programme.

Universal Television funded the resulting TV movie, Doctor Who. Several plans by John Leekley for a series bible, involving a total continuity reboot and a plan to remake many classic Doctor Who stories, were scrapped. The movie would be pitched to Fox, who agreed to let it serve as a backdoor pilot to a further television series revival if it did well. Amblin would pull out of production, but the movie would be produced, and instead of a reboot, would carry the same continuity as the original programme, notably via McCoy's reprisal of the Seventh Doctor role at the start of the film. Though the movie did well in the UK, drawing in a viewing figure of 9.1 million, US viewing figures were low (5.6 million) due to heavy competition from rival networks airing popular shows in the same timeslot, and were deemed not enough to prompt a television show revival. Paul McGann's Eighth Doctor, who led the film, would subsequently be utilised in spin-off material for the series, and further adventures starring the character would be portrayed across comics, audio dramas, and novels throughout the 1990s.

The BBC would later attempt multiple spin-off revivals of the show, such as through webcast productions like Death Comes to Time and the 2003 animated production Scream of the Shalka. The latter was intended to start a series of webcasts to continue the show's story, and was marketed as an official continuation to the series, though this would end up being sidelined as a result of the series officially being revived in 2005 starting with Doctor Who series 1.

=== Revival of scrapped stories ===
Big Finish would later adapt many of the scrapped concepts from Season 27, into audio dramas titled Doctor Who: The Lost Stories. This range would also revive the Raine Creevy character for this range as well.
