= Return of the Daleks =

Audio drama

Big Finish Productions audio drama
- Series: Doctor Who
- Release no.: 5
- Featuring: Seventh Doctor
- Written by: Nicholas Briggs
- Directed by: John Ainsworth
- Produced by: Sharon Gosling
- Executive producer(s): Nicholas Briggs; Jason Haigh-Ellery
- Production code: DECD02A set_between
- Length: 61 mins
- Release date: December 2006

Return of the Daleks is a Big Finish Productions audio drama based on the long-running British science fiction television series Doctor Who.

== Synopsis ==
The secret resistance led by Susan Mendes and Kalendorf encounters the Seventh Doctor on the planet Zaleria during Dalek occupation — a planet which hides a secret of its own.

== Cast ==
- The Doctor — Sylvester McCoy
- Kalendorf — Gareth Thomas
- Susan Mendes — Sarah Mowat
- Skerrill — Christine Brennan
- Mendac — Hylton Collins
- Aytrax — Jack Galagher
- The Daleks — Nicholas Briggs
- Dorla, Zalerian & Ogrons — Hylton Collins
- Zalerian 2 & Ogrons — Jack Galagher
- Ogrons & Talamar — Nicholas Briggs

== Continuity ==
- This story is set between episodes 1 and 2 of the events of the first Dalek Empire miniseries.
- The planet Zaleria is revealed to be Spiridon, the planet from the 1973 serial Planet of the Daleks. The Daleks are planning to thaw out the Dalek army frozen at the end of that story.
- The script for this play is published in the short story collection Short Trips: Dalek Empire.
