= Ian Briggs =

British television writer, author and manager

Ian Briggs (born 31 October 1958) is a British television writer, author and manager, whose work includes scripts for the BBC drama series Doctor Who and Casualty.

== Writing ==
Briggs wrote two serials for Doctor Who, Dragonfire and The Curse of Fenric, for the programme's 24th and 26th seasons respectively. Both stories featured Sylvester McCoy as the Seventh Doctor, while Dragonfire introduced Sophie Aldred as Ace. Briggs subsequently novelised both serials for the Target Books range. As part of Doctor Who's 60th anniversary in 2023, The Curse of Fenric was re-released with additional material by Pete McTighe in the Tales of the TARDIS series.

In 1990, Briggs contributed the episodes "Street Life" to the fifth series of Casualty and "Old Wounds" to the sixth series of The Bill.

He has also contributed a short story, The Celestial Harmony Engine to the Doctor Who anthology Short Trips: Defining Patterns, published by Big Finish in March, 2008.

== Other work ==
Briggs has worked in theatre management and arts marketing in recent years.
