= The Innocent Sleep =

- Directed by: Scott Michell
- Written by: Ray Villis
- Produced by: Scott Michell; Matthew Vaughn
- Starring: Rupert Graves; Annabella Sciorra; Michael Gambon; Franco Nero; John Hannah
- Cinematography: Alan Dunlop
- Edited by: Derek Trigg
- Music by: Mark Ayres
- Production company: Trimedial Films
- Distributed by: Starlight Films
- Release date: 26 January 1996
- Running time: 110 minutes
- Country: United Kingdom
- Language: English

The Innocent Sleep is a 1996 British thriller film directed by Scott Michell and starring Rupert Graves, Michael Gambon and Franco Nero. In the film, a homeless man witnesses a gangland killing and becomes a target himself; the film is inspired by the Roberto Calvi murder.

== Cast ==
- Rupert Graves as Alan Terry
- Hilary Crowson as Sheila Terry
- Annabella Sciorra as Billie Hayman
- Michael Gambon as Det. Insp. Matheson
- Franco Nero as Adolfo Cavani
- John Hannah as James
- Oliver Cotton as Lusano
- Tony Bluto as Thorn
- Paul Brightwell as Pelham
- Campbell Morrison as Mac
- Graham Crowden as George
- Sean Gilder as Police Constable
- Chris Jury as News Photographer
- Laura Berkeley as Glamorous Blonde
- Hugh Walters as Lewis
- Crispin Redman as Simon, CID
- Katie Carr as Alice
- Chris Armstrong as Dave, CID
- Lehla Eldridge as Morgue Attendant
- Struan Rodger as Peter Samson
- Stephen Yardley as Drago
- Ken Ratcliffe as Stephens
- Carmen De Venere as Cavani's Aide
- Paul Gregory as Newsreader
- Robert James as Hopkin
- Susan Gilmore as News Programme Presenter
- Peter Cartwright as Gerald Phillips
- Julian Rivett as Bike Courier
- Patrick Duggan as Landlord
- Peter Howell as Sir Frank
- Stephen Haynes as CID Policeman

== Box office ==
The film opened on 26 January 1996 on 66 screens in the United Kingdom and grossed £54,015 for the weekend, placing twelfth at the UK box office.

== Soundtrack ==
The Innocent Sleep

Soundtrack album by Mark Ayres
- Released: 1995
- Genre: Soundtrack
- Length: 59:04
- Label: Silva Screen

Mark Ayres chronology
Doctor Who: Ghost Light (1993)	''The Innocent Sleep'' (1995)	Shakedown: Return of the Sontarans (1996)

The film's soundtrack composed by Mark Ayres was released on CD by Silva Screen Records in 1995.

=== Track listing ===
All tracks are written by Mark Ayres.

No.	Title	Length
1.	"Il Sonno Innocente" (The Innocent Sleep - Main Title)	2:49
2.	"The Old Site"	1:27
3.	"Lusano/The Execution"	4:56
4.	"Warehouse Chase"	2:46
5.	"Riverside/Nightmare/Police Station"	5:23
6.	"Jail Break"	3:21
7.	"Billie/A Word with Willie"	1:01
8.	"Cavani/Billie Meets Alan" ("Il Sonno Innocente")	1:50
9.	"Alan Calls Home"	3:12
10.	"Arson"	2:40
11.	"Hospital/Alan at Billie's Place"	3:47
12.	"Press Conference"	4:24
13.	"Today in Focus"	1:26
14.	"Ears to the Ground/Motorbike Chase"	2:42
15.	"Cavani Flies In"	3:45
16.	"A Revelation and a Death"	1:31
17.	"'Anybody but Stephens'/A Man for a Crisis"	4:27
18.	"Tutto Posto"	4:49
19.	"Ashes" ("Il Sonno Innocente")	2:21

=== Personnel ===
Conductor: Nic Raine Leader: Kenneth Sillito Orchestra: The Chamber Orchestra of London Recorded by: Mike Ross-Trevor Soprano Vocals: Lesley Garrett (tracks: 1, 8, 19)

== Home media ==
The Innocent Sleep has been released in the following regions:

- Audio Visual Enterprises on Greek VHS in 1998
- Buena Vista Home Video on Netherlands VHS
- Payless Entertainment on Australian DVD in 2007
- Peachtree Video on US VHS in 1997
- Prooptiki in Greek theatrical locations in 1997
- Tango Entertainment on US DVD in 2005
- Trident Releasing on non-US sales release in 1996
