= Mark Ayres =

British composer (born 1960)

- Years active: 1987–present

Mark Richard Ayres (born 28 December 1960) is a British electronic musician, composer and audio engineer.

== Career ==
Ayres studied music and electronics at Keele University. He also worked as a sound engineer at TV-am between 1982 and 1987. As a television composer, he became known for providing incidental music on the original series of Doctor Who. Ayres's work on broadcast Doctor Who was during Sylvester McCoy's era as the Seventh Doctor, comprising The Greatest Show in the Galaxy, Ghost Light and The Curse of Fenric. Ayres was hired after he sent producer John Nathan-Turner a demonstration video containing music he had written to accompany Remembrance of the Daleks. Like most Doctor Who incidental music composers during the 1980s, Ayres created the music electronically, principally using digital synthesisers and samplers.

Ayres was also involved in the last days of the BBC Radiophonic Workshop, cataloguing and archiving their recordings for future use. As part of the BBC's unofficial Doctor Who Restoration Team, Ayres has also done much of the audio restoration work for the later VHS Doctor Who releases, as well as many of the DVD releases, and all of the "Missing Soundtrack" CD releases since 1999. Additionally, he edited the "Special Edition" of The Curse of Fenric, which restored much footage which was originally cut for time, along with some new special effects and a complete remix of the soundtrack. It is available along with the original on the BBC DVD release and the recent Season 26 blu-ray box set.

Ayres compiled and produced the CD Who Is Dr Who, released in 2000 by Cherry Red Records division RPM. He has also contributed to the DVD commentaries for several releases of the BBC's Doctor Who range (Planet of Giants, Terror of the Zygons, Paradise Towers, Dragonfire, The Greatest Show in the Galaxy and Ghost Light). He also worked with composers such as Peter Howell and Dominic Glynn on a 5.1 surround sound version for the theme tunes that comes straight out from the original multitrack recording with altered variations on each theme, such as a harder "swoop" sound of the bassline for Howell and new sound effects for the opening sequence and a new bassline for Glynn.

Ayres composed a new musical score for the colourised "blockbuster edit" of The Daleks, released in 2023. Ayres also researched, compiled and mastered the Doctor Who 50th Anniversary Collection, a 4-CD album with sound effects and music from the first 50 years of the show, some composed by Ayres himself.

== Filmography ==
=== Doctor Who ===
- The Greatest Show in the Galaxy (1988–89)
- Ghost Light (1989)
- The Curse of Fenric (1989)
