= The Curse of Fenric =

154 – The Curse of Fenric
- Doctor Who serial

Cast
- Doctor: Sylvester McCoy – Seventh Doctor
- Companion: Sophie Aldred – Ace
- Others: Dinsdale Landen – Dr. Judson; Alfred Lynch – Commander Millington; Stevan Rimkus – Captain Bates; Marcus Hutton – Sgt. Leigh; Christien Anholt – Perkins; Tomek Bork – Captain Sorin; Peter Czajowski – Sgt. Prozorov; Marek Anton – Vershinin; Mark Conrad – Petrossian; Nicholas Parsons – Rev. Mr. Wainwright; Janet Henfrey – Miss Hardaker; Joann Kenny – Jean; Joanne Bell – Phyllis; Anne Reid – Nurse Crane; Cory Pulman – Kathleen Dudman; Aaron Hanley – Baby Audrey; Raymond Trickett – Ancient Haemovore

Production
- Directed by: Nicholas Mallett; John Nathan-Turner (uncredited)
- Written by: Ian Briggs
- Script editor: Andrew Cartmel
- Produced by: John Nathan-Turner
- Music by: Mark Ayres
- Production code: 7M
- Series: Season 26
- Running time: 4 episodes, 25 minutes each
- First broadcast: 25 October 1989
- Last broadcast: 15 November 1989

Chronology
← Preceded by Ghost Light	Followed by → Survival

The Curse of Fenric is the third serial of the 26th season of the British science-fiction television series Doctor Who, which was first broadcast in four weekly parts on BBC1 from 25 October to 15 November 1989.

In it, the ancient evil force Fenric uses the vampiric Haemovores, descendants of humanity from the future, to attack a World War II naval base in England and orders them to destroy life on Earth by poisoning it with chemicals.

Two further versions of this story exist: the 1991 video release incorporated about six minutes of extra material into the original narrative, and the 2003 DVD included a 'Special Edition' edited into a single movie-length feature, with new special effects, re-editing of some scenes, and 12 minutes of unbroadcast footage. In 2023, an additional special edition was released as part of Tales of the TARDIS.

== Plot ==
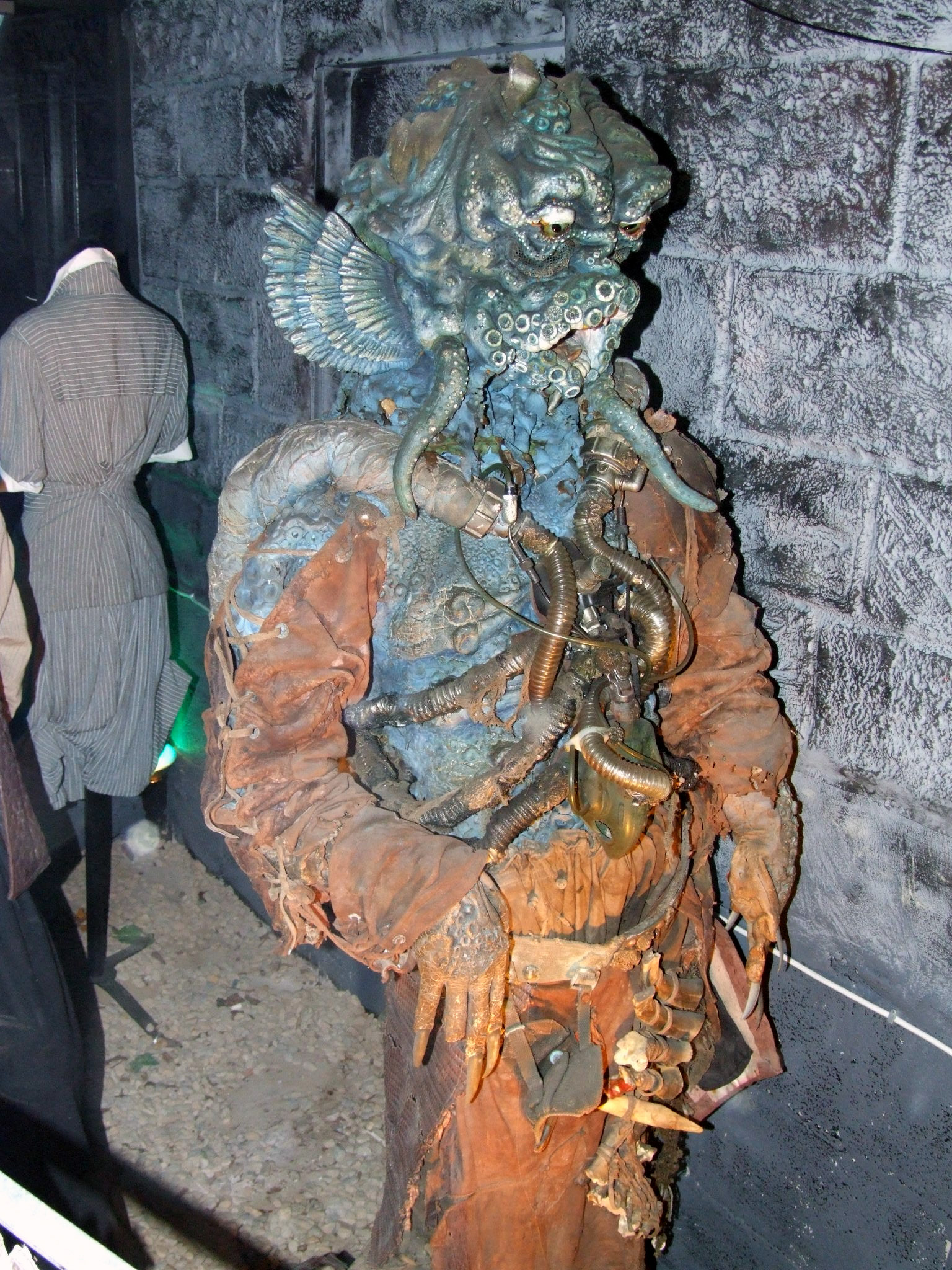
The Ancient One, as shown at the Doctor Who Experience

The Seventh Doctor and Ace arrive at a British naval installation near Maiden's Point on the Northumberland coast during World War II. The base contains a supply of nerve gas and the Ultima supercomputer used by Dr. Judson to decode German messages as well as Viking runes in the catacombs. The runes warn of Fenric, whom the Doctor recognizes as a force of pure evil from the dawn of time. The Doctor and Ace find a covert Russian squad attempting to steal Ultima. As Ace becomes smitten with their leader Captain Sorin, the Doctor warns them to lay low.

Exploring the catacombs, the Doctor and Ace find a glowing Oriental vase among the Viking treasures, which is confiscated by the base commander Millington and given to Judson to study. As Judson places it within Ultima, he is struck by and taken over by the spirit of Fenric. Fenric calls out to the Ancient One, a Haemovore in the nearby sea, whose army of Haemovores are in the process of attacking the base and local residents, turning them into Haemovores. Ace warns Kathleen, a WRNS, to escape with her newborn infant, Audrey.

The Doctor sets up a chess problem, hoping to distract Fenric long enough to find a permanent solution to stop him. Fenric instructs the Ancient One to carry a deadly poison away to be released after killing the other Haemovores with a mental command. Sorin arrives and tries to kill Fenric but learns he is one of his "wolves", individuals manipulated by his powers, descendants of the Vikings that brought the Oriental vase here. Ace arrives, sees Sorin studying the chessboard, and offers the solution. The Doctor arrives too late as Sorin reveals himself as Fenric, commanding the Ancient One to attack the Doctor. A psychic barrier created by Ace's trust in the Doctor stops him. Fenric tells Ace she is one of his wolves, having created the time storm that took her to Iceworld to meet the Doctor as he used a similar event to bring the Ancient One, and she furthered her own cycle by making sure Audrey, her mother, was safe. Fenric threatens to kill Ace unless The Doctor kneels before him, but The Doctor urges Fenric to kill her exclaiming that he knew of her being one of the wolves from the beginning, as the only reason he let her travel with him.

Ace's faith in the Doctor is shattered but, instead of attacking them, the Ancient One seizes Fenric and chases him into the gas chamber releasing the deadly poison. The Doctor and Ace flee the base before it explodes, killing Fenric and the Ancient One and ending the threat. Ace takes a moment to contemplate why she hates her mother and to celebrate overcoming her irrational fear of the water, before she and the Doctor depart.

=== Continuity ===
The Doctor chants the names of his former companions to ward off the Haemovores. Most of the names he chants are inaudible, but a few can be made out, including Susan, Barbara, Vicki, and Steven, companions of the First Doctor. Ace mentions an old house in Perivale. This was originally intended as a foreshadowing of Ghost Light; the resequencing of the broadcast schedule, however, altered it into an apparent reference to a past story. Similarly, the Doctor's new wardrobe for season 26 was hidden throughout part one by a long duffel coat, setting up a dramatic revelation when he removed the coat. Sylvester McCoy, however, has stated that he was given the coat to shelter from the cold weather on location, and was permitted to retain it on-screen.

== Production ==
=== Pre-production ===
Writer Ian Briggs based Dr Judson on Alan Turing. In an interview for the DVD release of this story, Briggs said that since at that time it was not considered appropriate to depict a character's struggle with homosexuality in a family programme, he transformed Turing's frustration at being unable to express his true sexual identity into Judson's frustration at being disabled. In the same interview, Briggs stated that he intended to suggest that both Judson and Millington were gay and had a shared past, although this was not realised in the finished programme.

This story was originally going to be titled The Wolves of Fenric (and before that, Wolf-Time). Fenric does refer to his servants as his "wolves" (and wolves play a strong role in Norse mythology, especially the monster Fenrir). However, Nathan-Turner felt that as the "wolves" connection was not revealed until quite late in the story, the title would not initially make sense to the audience.

Although there are several references in the story to the Norse belief in a final battle at the end of the world, the word Ragnarok was removed from the script to avoid confusion with the Gods of Ragnarok from the previous season's The Greatest Show in the Galaxy.

This story is the second in what some have called the "Ace Trilogy", a three-story arc that explores elements of Ace's past before she met the Doctor. This was not an intentional trilogy, since Fenric was originally intended to start the season. Fenric was moved to third in the season because its horror themes were seen as more fitting for airing in October.

=== Production ===
The Curse of Fenric was originally to have been shot, as with most Doctor Who serials, as a mixture of studio interiors and location exteriors. However, after reading the script, director Nicholas Mallett persuaded producer John Nathan-Turner that given the settings involved, the serial could be made more effective and realistic by shooting the entire production on location. Shooting went over-length to such a degree that consideration was briefly given to editing the story into five rather than four episodes. However, Ian Briggs strongly opposed this, feeling that the narrative flow would be badly disrupted.

The setting of the story is disputed as either Northumberland or near Whitby, North Yorkshire, although Reverend Wainwright's mention of Dracula coming ashore there indicates the latter. The scenes set in the fictional location of Maiden's Point were shot on location at Lulworth Cove in Dorset. The production also visited Kent and filmed at Lillesden Manor which doubled as the laboratory under the church, Roses Farm in Hawkhurst, which doubled as Mrs Hardaker's Cottage, and St Lawrence Church in Hawkhurst which doubled as St Jude's Church.

=== Cast notes ===
- Marek Anton, who played the Destroyer in the first story of the season Battlefield, is the Russian soldier Vershinin.
- The infant Audrey was the son of the proprietors of the Bush Hotel on Shepherd's Bush Green, familiar to the production team as it was near the Doctor Who offices.
- This serial features guest appearances from Dinsdale Landen as Dr Judson and Nicholas Parsons as Reverend Wainwright. See also list of guest appearances in Doctor Who.
- Two of the Haemovores in this story are played by Sylvester McCoy's sons: Sam and Joe Kent-Smith.
- Anne Reid returned to Doctor Who as a Plasmavore named Florence Finnegan in the Tenth Doctor episode "Smith and Jones".
- Actress Janet Henfrey was a schoolfriend of Sophie Aldred's mother. Her character of Miss Hardaker was modelled on the part she played, again as a school teacher, in two Dennis Potter dramas: Stand Up, Nigel Barton (1965) and The Singing Detective (1986). Henfrey returned to the series as Mrs. Pitt in the Twelfth Doctor episode "Mummy on the Orient Express".
- Sylvia Syms was originally offered the part of Miss Hardaker but played the character Mrs Pritchard in Ghost Light.

== Broadcast and reception ==
Episode	Title	Run time	Original release date	UK viewers (millions)
1	"Part One"	24:23	25 October 1989	4.3
2	"Part Two"	24:09	1 November 1989	4.0
3	"Part Three"	24:11	8 November 1989	4.0
4	"Part Four"	24:16	15 November 1989	4.2

Paul Cornell, Martin Day, and Keith Topping described the serial as "something special" with "many magical scenes" in The Discontinuity Guide (1995). In The Television Companion (1998), David J. Howe and Stephen James Walker praised the direction and horror. In 2012, Mark Braxton of Radio Times awarded it four stars out of five. He wrote that there was "much to enjoy and admire" and suggested it as an influence on the revived Doctor Who in terms of companions. However, he felt that it was "as if three scripts have been rewritten as one", considering the plot was too convoluted and observing that the special effects were "a mixed bag". Christopher Bahn, reviewing the serial for The A.V. Club, also commented on its influence on the modern series, but felt it hadn't "aged well visually" and "often looks cheap and feels cheesy, but the way it takes chances and stretches the boundaries of what Doctor Who was about is admirable, even if that might have been too-little-too-late for a show that would be off the air in two months." He also believed it "starts strongly and has some terrific moments, but gets convoluted and confusing toward the finale." He criticised the "less-than-graceful dialogue" and special effects, and felt that Fenric and the Haemavores lacked sufficient background.

== Commercial releases ==
=== In print ===
The Curse of Fenric
- Author: Ian Briggs
- Cover artist: Alister Pearson
- Series: Doctor Who book: Target novelisations
- Release number: 151
- Publisher: Target Books
- Publication date: 15 November 1990
- ISBN: 0-426-20348-8

Ian Briggs novelisation was published by Target Books in November 1990. The novel features additional character information and an epilogue featuring an older Ace after she has left the Doctor. This formed part of the basis for Ace's departure in Kate Orman's Virgin New Adventures novel Set Piece, where she chooses to stay in Paris to monitor a time rift and at some point has a relationship with one of Captain Sorin's ancestors.

=== Home media ===
The Curse of Fenric was released on VHS in 1991. The release included six minutes of extra scenes. It was released on DVD in the United Kingdom in October 2003 in a two-disc set, part of the Doctor Who 40th Anniversary Celebration releases with an additional DVD commentary by Sylvester McCoy, Sophie Aldred, and Nicholas Parsons, plus a 'Special Edition' edited into one movie-length adventure including 12 minutes of unbroadcast material. This version has reworked special effects and music arranged by Mark Ayres based on notes by him and the late Nicholas Mallett; it also has several scenes re-edited to produce a more coherent narrative. It was also released as part of the Doctor Who DVD Files in issue 39 on 30 June 2010.

It was released on Blu-ray as part of the Time Lord Victorious box set.

The serial was released on blu-ray on 27 January 2020 as part of "The Collection - Season 26" box set. It features, not only the original TV broadcast episodes of The Curse of Fenric, but also the extended VHS release episodes as well as a special feature-length extended edition.

=== Tales of the TARDIS ===
A special edition of the episode aired on BBC iPlayer on 1 November 2023, in the spin-off Tales of the TARDIS.

=== Soundtrack release ===
Doctor Who: The Curse of Fenric

Soundtrack album by Mark Ayres
- Released: 1991
- Genre: Soundtrack
- Length: 72:09
- Label: Silva Screen

Mark Ayres chronology
Myths and Other Legends (1990)	Doctor Who: The Curse of Fenric (1991)	Doctor Who: The Greatest Show in the Galaxy (1992)

Doctor Who soundtrack chronology
The Doctor Who 25th Anniversary Album (1988)	The Curse of Fenric (1991)	The Greatest Show in the Galaxy (1991)

Mark Ayres's music was released on CD in 1991 by Silva Screen Records.

==== Track listing ====
All tracks are written by Mark Ayres, except where noted.

No.	Title	Length
1.	"Introduction: "Doctor Who"" (Ron Grainer arr. Keff McCulloch)
2.	"The Boats"
3.	"Beach-Head and Rat-Trap"
4.	"Sealed Orders"
5.	"Eyes Watching"
6.	"Commander Millington"
7.	"Viking Graves"
8.	"Maiden's Point"
9.	"The Translations"
10.	"Audrey and Millington's Office"
11.	"The Curse of Fenric"
12.	"High Stakes"
13.	"The Crypt"
14.	"The Ambush"
15.	"The Well of Vergelmir"
16.	"The Ultima Machine"
17.	"Dangerous Undercurrents"
18.	"The Seduction of Prozorov"
19.	"Half-Time Score"
20.	"Exit Miss Hardaker/The Vicar and the Vampires"
21.	"Stop the Machine!"
22.	"The Haemovores"
23.	"The Battle for St. Jude's"
24.	"The Mineshaft"
25.	"Sealing the Hatch"
26.	"House Guests"
27.	"The Telegram"
28.	"Evil from the Dawn of Time"
29.	"The Storm Breaks"
30.	"Ancient Enemies"
31.	"Shadow Dimensions"
32.	"Chemical Grenade"
33.	"The Great Serpent"
34.	"Pawns in the Game"
35.	"Kathleen's Escape"
36.	"The Wolves of Fenric"
37.	"Black Wins, Time Lord!"
38.	"The Final Battle"
39.	"Epilogue: "Doctor Who"" (Ron Grainer arr. Keff McCulloch)
