= Alan Wareing =

British television director (born 1943)

- Born: 16 August 1943 (age 82); Chorley, Lancashire, England
- Occupation: Television director
- Years active: 1973–present

Alan Wareing (born 16 August 1943 in Chorley, Lancashire) is a British television director. He became interested in directing through amateur theatre. He directed many plays before he started working in BBC Television, firstly as an assistant floor manager and then as a production assistant, before training to be a director at the corporation. His early work as a director included three Doctor Who serials from Sylvester McCoy's era as the Seventh Doctor, and he has directed hundreds of episodes of the ITV soap operas Coronation Street and Emmerdale.

== Filmography ==
=== Director ===
- London's Burning - 1988
- Doctor Who
  - The Greatest Show in the Galaxy - 1988
  - Ghost Light - 1989
  - Survival - 1989
- Notaufnahme - 1995
- Wycliffe
  - Strangers - 1997
  - Bad Blood - 1997
  - Time Out - 1998
  - Feeding the Rat - 1998
  - Scope - 1998
  - Land's End - 1998
- Casualty
  - Cry for Help - 1987
  - Cross Fingers - 1987
  - Fun Night - 1987
  - These Things Happen - 1987
  - Close to Home - 1990
  - Say It with Flowers - 1990
  - All's Fair - 1990
  - Beggars Can't Be Choosers - 1991
  - Sins of Omission - 1991
  - Allegiance - 1991
  - Rates of Exchange - 1992
  - Cherish - 1992
  - Tender Loving Care - 1992
  - Divided Loyalties - 1993
  - No Cause for Alarm - 1993
  - Moving On - 1997
  - An Eye for an Eye - 1998
  - One from the Heart - 1998
  - Making a Difference - 1998
  - Seeing the Light - 1999
  - Just a Kiss - 1999
  - Untouchable - 2000
  - Chinese Whispers - 2000
  - The Long Road Home - 2001
- Coronation Street
  - Episode #1.5328 - 2002
  - Episode #1.6074 - 2005
  - Episode #1.6073 - 2005
  - Episode #1.6076 - 2005
  - Episode #1.6468 - 2007
  - Episode #1.6467 - 2007
- Emmerdale Farm
  - Episode dated 25 May 1993
  - Episode dated 27 May 1993
  - Episode dated 6 June 2000
  - Episode dated 19 July 2001
  - Episode dated 20 February 2003
  - Episode dated 21 February 2003
  - Episode dated 6 October 2003
  - Episode dated 7 October 2003
  - Episode dated 8 October 2003
  - Episode dated 9 October 2003
  - Episode dated 10 October 2003
  - Episode dated 12 October 2003
  - Episode dated 18 November 2003
  - Episode dated 19 November 2003
  - Episode dated 20 November 2003
  - Episode dated 21 November 2003
  - Episode dated 24 November 2003
  - Episode dated 4 January 2004
  - Episode dated 5 January 2004
  - Episode dated 6 January 2004
  - Episode dated 7 January 2004
  - Episode dated 8 January 2004
  - Episode dated 9 January 2004
  - Episode dated 30 January 2006
  - Episode dated 31 January 2006
  - Episode dated 1 February 2006
  - Episode dated 2 February 2006
  - Episode dated 21 March 2006
  - Episode dated 22 March 2006
  - Episode dated 26 March 2006
  - Episode dated 15 April 2007
  - Episode dated 16 April 2007
- Holby City - 2013

=== Production Manager ===
- Tenko - 1981
- The Dark Side of the Sun - 1983
- A Murder is Announced - 1985
- Lovejoy
  - The Real Thing - 1986
  - The Axeman Cometh - 1986

=== Other ===
- Survivors (assistant floor manager) - 1975
- Doctor Who
  - The Keeper of Traken: Part one (production assistant) - 1981
- Super Sleuths
  - Wycliffe (Himself) - 2006
