= List of non-televised Seventh Doctor stories =

In addition to the televised episodes of Doctor Who starring Sylvester McCoy, the Seventh Doctor has appeared in a number of spin-off media.

== Audio dramas ==
=== Others ===
No.	Title	Written by	Released	Ref
1	"Death Comes to Time"	Colin Meek	July 2001	
2	"Excelis Decays"	Craig Hinton	July 2002	
3	"The Prisoner's Dilemma"	Simon Guerrier	February 2009	
4	"Bernice Summerfield and the Criminal Code"	Eddie Robson	January 2010	
5	"The Four Doctors"	Peter Anghelides	December 2010	
6	"Thin Ice"	Marc Platt	April 2011	
7	"Crime of the Century"	Andrew Cartmel	May 2011	
8	"Animal"	Andrew Cartmel	June 2011	
9	"Earth Aid"	Ben Aaronovitch, Andrew Cartmel	July 2011	
10	"Project: Nirvana"	Cavan Scott, Mark Wright	September 2012	
11	"UNIT: Dominion"	Nicholas Briggs, Jason Arnopp	October 2012	
12	"Many Happy Returns"	Various	November 2012	
13	"Destiny of the Doctor: Shockwave"	James Swallow	July 2013	
14	"The Light at the End"	Nicholas Briggs	October 2013	
15	"The New Adventures of Bernice Summerfield Volume 1"	Various	June 2014	
16	"The New Adventures of Bernice Summerfield Volume 2"	Various	June 2015	
17	"The Brink of Death"	Nicholas Briggs	August 2015	
18	"The Eleven"	Matt Fitton	October 2015	
19	"Harvest of the Sycorax"	James Goss	July 2016	
20	"The Unknown"	Guy Adams	December 2016	
21	"The Eye of the Storm"	Matt Fitton	December 2016	
22	"The Lost Magic"	Cavan Scott	May 2017	
23	"The Big Blue Book"	Lizzie Hopley	March 2019	
24	"The Split Infinitive"	John Dorney	July 2019	
25	"Collision Course"	Guy Adams	July 2019	
26	"The Artist at the End of Time"	James Goss	June 2023	
27	"A Genius for War"	Jonathan Morris	July 2023	
28	"Past Lives"	Robert Valentine	August 2023	
29	"The Union"	Matt Fitton	October 2023	
30	"Broken Memories"	Davivd K Barnes	March 2024	

== Novels and novellas ==
=== Others ===
No.	Title	Written by	Released	Ref
1	"Cold Fusion"	Lance Parkin	December 1996	
2	"The Eight Doctors"	Terrance Dicks	June 1997	
3	"Citadel of Dreams"	Dave Stone	March 2002	
4	"Companion Piece"	Mike Tucker, Robert Perry	December 2003	
5	"Shroud of Sorrow"	Tommy Donbavand	April 2013	
6	"The Time Lord Letters"	Justin Richards	September 2015	
7	"At Childhood's End"	Sophie Aldred	February 2020	

== Comics ==
=== Doctor Who Magazine ===
No.	Title	Written by	Released
1	"A Cold Day in Hell!"	Simon Furman	October 1987
2	"Redemption!"	Simon Furman	February 1988
3	"The Crossroads of Time"	Simon Furman	March 1988
4	"Claws of the Klathi!"	Mike Collins	April 1988
5	"Culture Shock!"	Grant Morrison	July 1988
6	"Keepsake"	Simon Furman	August 1988
7	"Planet of the Dead"	John Freeman	September 1988
8	"Echoes of the Mogor!"	Dan Abnett	November 1988
9	"Time and Tide"	Richard Alan, John Carnell	January 1989
10	"Follow That TARDIS!"	John Carnell	March 1989
11	"Invaders from Gantac!"	Alan Grant	April 1989
12	"Nemesis of the Daleks"	Richard Alan, Steve Alan	August 1989
13	"Stairway to Heaven"	Paul Cornell, John Freeman	December 1989
14	"Train-Flight"	Andrew Donkin, Graham S. Brand	March 1990
15	"Doctor Conkerer!"	Ian Rimmer	June 1990
16	"Fellow Travellers"	Andrew Cartmel	August 1990
17	"Distractions"	Dan Abnett	November 1990
18	"The Mark of Mandragora"	Dan Abnett	December 1990
19	"Party Animals"	Gary Russell	April 1991
20	"The Chameleon Factor"	Paul Cornell	May 1991
21	"The Good Soldier"	Andrew Cartmel	June 1991
22	"A Glitch in Time"	John Freeman	October 1991
23	"The Grief"	Dan Abnett	March 1992
24	"Ravens"	Andrew Cartmel	June 1992
25	"Memorial"	Scott Gray	September 1992
26	"Cat Litter"	Marc Platt	October 1992
27	"Pureblood"	Dan Abnett	October 1992
28	"Emperor of the Daleks!"	Paul Cornell	February 1993
29	"Final Genesis"	Scott Gray	August 1993
30	"Time & Time Again"	Paul Cornell	November 1993
31	"Cuckoo"	Dan Abnett	December 1993
32	"Uninvited Guest"	Scott Gray	March 1994
33	"Ground Zero"	Scott Gray	April 1996
34	"Happy Deathday"	Scott Gray	November 1998
35	"The Last Word"	Gareth Roberts	May 2001

=== Doctor Who Magazine Specials ===
No.	Title	Written by	Released
1	"Seaside Rendezvous"	Paul Cornell	July 1991
2	"Under Pressure"	Dan Abnett	September 1991
3	"Metamorphosis"	Paul Cornell	September 1992
4	"Flashback"	Warwick Gray	September 1992
5	"Evening's Empire"	Andrew Cartmel	September 1993
6	"A Religious Experienc"	Tim Quinn	September 1993
7	"Untitled"	Tim Quinn	September 1993
8	"Younger and Wiser"	Warwick Gray	July 1994
9	"Plastic Millenium"	Gareth Roberts	December 1994

=== The Incredible Hulk Presents ===
No.	Title	Written by	Released
1	"Once in a Lifetime"	John Freeman	October 1989
2	"Hunger from the End of Time"	Dan Abnett	October 1989
3	"War World"	John Freeman	October 1989
4	"Technical Hitch"	Dan Abnett	November 1989
5	"A Switch in Time"	John Freeman	November 1989
6	"The Senitel"	John Tomlinson	November 1989
7	"Who's that Girl"	Simon Furman	November 1989
8	"The Enlightenment of Ly-Chee the Wise"	Simon Jowett	December 1989
9	"Slimmer"	Mike Collins, Tim Robins	December 1989
10	"Nineveh"	John Tomlinson	December 1989

=== Others ===
No.	Title	Written by	Released
1	"Time Bomb!"	Steve Parkhouse	July 1989
2	"The Incomplete Death's Head"	Dan Abnett	1992
3	"The Forgotten"	Tony Lee	August 2008
4	"Cat and Mouse"	Scott & David Tipton	July 2013
5	"Endgame"	Scott & David Tipton	November 2013
6	"Dead Man's Hand"	Tony Lee	December 2013
7	"Prologue: The Seventh Doctor"	George Mann, Cavan Scott	July 2016
8	"Supremacy of the Cybermen"	George Mann, Cavan Scott	July 2016
9	"Operation Volcano"	Andrew Cartmel	June 2018
10	"Hill of Beans"	Richard Dinnick	June 2018
11	"Crossing the Rubicon"	Richard Dinnick	September 2018
12	"Firelight"	Dan Slott	November 2023
