= Ghost Light (Doctor Who) =

153 – Ghost Light
- Doctor Who serial

Cast
- Doctor: Sylvester McCoy – Seventh Doctor
- Companion: Sophie Aldred – Ace
- Others: Ian Hogg – Josiah Samuel Smith; Michael Cochrane – Redvers Fenn-Cooper; Carl Forgione – Nimrod; Sharon Duce – Control; John Nettleton – Reverend Ernest Matthews; Katharine Schlesinger (Note: Incorrectly credited as Katherine Schlesinger on the broadcast versions of parts one and two.) – Gwendoline; Frank Windsor – Inspector Mackenzie; Brenda Kempner – Mrs Grose; Sylvia Syms – Mrs Pritchard; John Hallam – Light

Production
- Directed by: Alan Wareing
- Written by: Marc Platt
- Script editor: Andrew Cartmel
- Produced by: John Nathan-Turner
- Music by: Mark Ayres
- Production code: 7Q
- Series: Season 26
- Running time: 3 episodes, 25 minutes each
- First broadcast: 4 October 1989
- Last broadcast: 18 October 1989

Chronology
← Preceded by Battlefield	Followed by → The Curse of Fenric

Ghost Light is the second serial of the 26th season of the British science fiction television series Doctor Who, which was first broadcast in three weekly parts on BBC1 from 4 to 18 October 1989.

Set in a mansion house in Perivale in 1883, Josiah Smith (Ian Hogg), a cataloguer of life forms from another planet, seeks to assassinate Queen Victoria and take over the British Empire.

== Plot ==
Thousands of years ago, an alien expedition came to Earth to catalogue life. After completing its task and collecting samples, which included the Neanderthal Nimrod, the leader alien, known as Light, went into slumber. By 1881, another alien, who had adopted the name Josiah Smith, gained control and kept Light in hibernation and imprisoned a third crewmember known as Control on the ship, which had now become the cellar of a manor named Gabriel Chase. Smith began evolving into the era's dominant life-form – the Victorian gentleman – and also took over the house. By 1883, Smith, having "evolved" into forms approximating a human and casting off his old husks as an insect would, managed to lure and capture the explorer Redvers Fenn-Cooper, brainwashing him. Utilising Fenn-Cooper's association with Queen Victoria, he plans to get close to her so that he can assassinate her and subsequently take control of the British Empire.

The TARDIS arrives at Gabriel Chase. Ace had visited the house in 1983 and had felt an evil presence. The Seventh Doctor's curiosity drives him to seek answers. He encounters Control, which has now taken on human form, and makes a deal with it. The Doctor helps it release Light. Once awake, Light is displeased by all the changes while he was asleep. Smith tries to keep his plan intact, but events are moving beyond his control. As Control tries to "evolve" into a Lady, Ace tries to come to grips with her feelings about the house, revealing that she burned it down when she felt the evil. The Doctor finally convinces Light of the futility of opposing evolution, which causes him to overload and dissipate into the surrounding house. Control's complete evolution into a Lady derails Smith's plan as Fenn-Cooper, having freed himself from Smith's brainwashing, chooses to side with her instead of him. In the end, with Smith taken captive on the ship, Control, Fenn-Cooper, and Nimrod set off in the alien ship to explore the universe.

=== Outside references ===
In the dinner scene, the Doctor says, "Who was it said Earthmen never invite their ancestors around to dinner?" This refers to Douglas Adams' The Hitchhiker's Guide to the Galaxy.

== Production ==
Episode	Title	Run time	Original release date	UK viewers (millions)
1	"Part One"	24:17	4 October 1989	4.2
2	"Part Two"	24:18	11 October 1989	4.0
3	"Part Three"	24:17	18 October 1989	4.0

=== Pre-production ===
Working titles for this story included The Bestiary and Life-Cycle. As revealed in the production notes for the DVD release, the story was renamed Das Haus der tausend Schrecken (The House of a Thousand Frights/Horrors) upon translation into German.

The story evolved out of an earlier, rejected script entitled Lungbarrow. It was to be set on Gallifrey in the Doctor's ancestral home and deal with the Doctor's past, but producer John Nathan-Turner felt that it revealed too much of the Doctor's origins. Script editor Andrew Cartmel said it "was too internal a script to really work as a drama." It was reworked to make both evolution and the idea of an ancient house central to the story. Marc Platt used elements of his original idea for his Virgin New Adventures novel Lungbarrow.

=== Production ===
Ghost Light was the final production of the original 26-year run, with the last recorded sequence being the final scene between Mrs Pritchard and Gwendoline. It was not, however, the last to be screened – The Curse of Fenric and Survival, both produced beforehand, followed it in transmission order.

The master tapes for Parts One and Two were changed after broadcast to correct a spelling error in the credits, Katharine Schlesinger originally being misspelt as Katherine Schlesinger.

=== Cast notes ===
Michael Cochrane and Frank Windsor had both previously appeared in Doctor Who with Peter Davison; Cochrane as Charles Cranleigh in Black Orchid in Season 19; Windsor played Ranulf in The King's Demons in Season 20. Carl Forgione appeared in the final serial of the Jon Pertwee era, Planet of the Spiders.

== Commercial releases ==
=== Home media ===
Ghost Light was released on VHS in May 1994. A DVD was released in September 2004, with many extended and deleted scenes included as bonus features. However, unlike The Curse of Fenric, these scenes no longer existed in broadcast quality as the master 625 line PAL colour videotapes containing the extra footage had been erased for reuse shortly after the story was broadcast, and were thus sourced from VHS copies, some with timecodes burnt-in, i.e. recorded permanently onto the picture. This made an extended edit, as had been prepared for the Curse of Fenric DVD release the previous year, impossible. This serial was also released as part of the Doctor Who DVD Files in Issue 96 on 5 September 2012. In February 2020 the full serial was released as part of the Doctor Who: The Collection Season 26 box-set with a new Extended Workprint Cut.

Extended Workprint

Episode	Title	Run time
1	"Part One"	27:30
2	"Part Two"	28:16
3	"Part Three"	27:14

=== In print ===
Ghost Light
- Author: Marc Platt
- Cover artist: Alister Pearson
- Series: Doctor Who book: Target novelisations
- Release number: 149
- Publisher: Target Books
- Publication date: 20 September 1990
- ISBN: 0-426-20351-8

Marc Platt's novelisation was published by Target Books in September 1990.

In June 2011, an audiobook of the novelisation was released, read by Ian Hogg.

The script, edited by John McElroy, was published by Titan Books in June 1993. Marc Platt contributed a chapter, written especially for this book, which rectified the omissions from the transmitted story.

=== Soundtrack release ===
Doctor Who: Ghost Light

Soundtrack album by Mark Ayres
- Released: June 1993 (original); 26 August 2013 (reissue)
- Genre: Soundtrack
- Length: 51:34
- Label: Silva Screen

Mark Ayres chronology
The Greatest Show in the Galaxy (1992)	''Doctor Who: Ghost Light'' (1993)	The Innocent Sleep (1995)

Doctor Who soundtrack chronology
The Greatest Show in the Galaxy (1992)	Ghost Light (1993)	Pyramids of Mars (1993)

The soundtrack album for this serial was released on Silva Screen Records in 1993 on CD with a cover adapted from the novelisation cover. It was reissued on CD with extra tracks on 26 August 2013 with a new cover.

==== Track listing ====
All tracks are written by Mark Ayres, except where noted.

Original 1993 track listing
No.	Title	Length
1.	"The Madhouse"
2.	"Redvers, I Presume?"
3.	"Uncharted Territory"
4.	"Heart of the Interior"
5.	"Enter Josiah"
6.	"Indoor Lightning"
7.	"Nimrod Observed"
8.	"Time to Emerge"
9.	"Burnt Toast"
10.	"Ace's Adventures Underground"
11.	"Where is Mamma?"
12.	"Loss of Control"
13.	"The Way to the Zoo"
14.	"The Memory Teller"
15.	"Lighting the Touchpaper"
16.	"Homo Victorianus Ineptus"
17.	"Out of the Shadows"
18.	"Light Enlightened"
19.	"Tropic of Perivale"
20.	"Tricks of the Light"
21.	"Judgement in Stone"
22.	"Requiem"
23.	"Passing Thoughts"

2013 reissue track listing
No.	Title	Length
1.	"Doctor Who (Opening Theme)" (Ron Grainer arr. Keff McCulloch)	00’55″
2.	"The Madhouse"	03’52″
3.	"Redvers, I Presume?"	00’44″
4.	"Uncharted Territory"	01’41″
5.	"Heart of the Interior"	02’19″
6.	"Gwendoline" (previously unreleased)	00’23″
7.	"The Fang of a Cave Bear" (previously unreleased)	00’19″
8.	"Enter Josiah"	00’29″
9.	"Indoor Lightning"	01’39″
10.	"Nimrod Observed"	01’02″
11.	"Time to Emerge"	01’24″
12.	"Burnt Toast"	01’42″
13.	"Ace’s Adventures Underground"	04’37″
14.	"Where is Mamma?"	00’44″
15.	"Loss of Control"	03’34″
16.	"The Way to the Zoo"	01’54″
17.	"The Hungry Inspector" (previously unreleased)	00’34″
18.	"The Memory Teller"	01’51″
19.	"Lighting the Touchpaper"	01’11″
20.	"Homo Victorianus Ineptus"	01’20″
21.	"Out of the Shadows"	04’03″
22.	"Light Enlightened"	01’58″
23.	"Tropic of Perivale"	02’16″
24.	"Tricks of the Light"	04’31″
25.	"Judgement in Stone"	02’20″
26.	"Requiem"	05’04″
27.	"Passing Thoughts"	01’25″
28.	"Doctor Who (Closing Theme)" (Ron Grainer arr. Keff McCulloch)	01’13″
29.	"The Madhouse" (demo version, previously unreleased)	03’45″
30.	"Redvers, I Presume?" (demo version, previously unreleased)	00’25″
31.	"Uncharted Territory" (demo version, previously unreleased)	01’36″
32.	"Heart of the Interior" (demo version, previously unreleased)	02’18″
33.	"Gwendoline" (demo version, previously unreleased)	00’22″
34.	"The Fang of a Cave Bear" (demo version, previously unreleased)	00’18″
35.	"Enter Josiah" (demo version, previously unreleased)	00’29″
36.	"Indoor Lightning" (demo version, previously unreleased)	01’39″
37.	"Nimrod Observed" (demo version, previously unreleased)	01’02″
38.	"Time to Emerge" (demo version, previously unreleased)	01’08″
39.	"Burnt Toast" (demo version, previously unreleased)	01’35″
40.	"Ace’s Adventures Underground" (demo version, previously unreleased)	01’31″

== Critical analysis ==
A book length study written by Jonathan Dennis was published as part of The Black Archive series from Obverse Books in 2016.

The serial was covered in volume 46 of the Doctor Who: The Complete History, which reprinted Andrew Pixley's Archive features from Doctor Who Magazine and the various Doctor Who Magazine Special Editions, as well as new articles created specifically for the book.
