= Doctor Who: Destiny of the Doctors =

1997 video game

- Developer: Studio Fish
- Publisher: BBC Multimedia
- Director: Nick Holden
- Producer: Dave Anderson
- Designer: Jason White
- Series: Doctor Who
- Engine: BRender
- Platform: Microsoft Windows
- Release: 5 December 1997
- Genre: Action
- Mode: Single-player

Doctor Who: Destiny of the Doctors is an action video game based on the BBC British science fiction television series Doctor Who. It was released on 5 December 1997 by BBC Multimedia.

== Gameplay ==
The bulk of the game takes place in the Doctor's TARDIS (and, on occasion, the Master's TARDIS, reached via junctions between the two). The player can select any one of the Doctor's seven incarnations and to go in search of them.

The player plays as the Graak, a jellyfish-like being. Upon leaving the Console Room, must find the Great Divide. The Graak must avoid enemies and can use weapons and implements in the TARDIS to incapacitate or kill these monsters, some of which can be kept throughout the quest (such as the sonic screwdriver, or a radio used to contact Brigadier Lethbridge-Stewart for advice and hints), and others which can only be used for a limited time (such as Dalekanium and watering cans).

Upon reaching the Great Divide, the player selects a symbol and the Master gives the Graak a riddle. During the loading time, a map of the area of the TARDIS the player will explore is shown. The Graak will have to complete a certain objective, find certain information on monsters or Doctors (either from the Doctor's "City of Thoughts" database in his TARDIS or from the Master's "Monster Database"), or collect an item. Whilst the player is scouring the TARDIS, they may use telepathic links with the Doctor, who will give a short clue to the player. If the player fails their task, they will have to begin again from the nearest Time Winder. If they succeed, they will have to face the Master in the Determinant. If they defeat the Master, that incarnation of the Doctor is freed:

- First Doctor - A chase around the Celestial Toymaker's toybox (with Quarks)
- Second Doctor - A race against the Master on London Underground trains (with Yeti)
- Third Doctor - Seek and destroy the Dalek spaceship
- Fourth Doctor - Search around the maze that is the Doctor's mind (with Raston Warrior Robots)
- Fifth Doctor - A joust in a medieval ring against a Sontaran on a hoverbike
- Sixth Doctor - Search the icy wilderness of Mars to find the Doctor
- Seventh Doctor - Race against the Master's car in the Doctor's Edwardian car, Bessie (with Autons)

== Plot ==
The Sontarans are one of the alien races featured in the game.

The Doctor's nemesis the Master has taken control of the planet Siralos, which is made of "pure psychic energy". With this planet's power, he plans to mould the universe into his will. To begin, he takes the first seven incarnations of the Doctor out of time and space and puts them in the Determinant, a domain he has created from the conquered will of Siralos. He plans to eradicate any trace of the Doctor from time and space, so he may be free to rebuild the cosmos as he pleases. However, the Graak (a psychic being created by the Doctor), pledges to stop the Master's plans.

The Master has placed several of the Doctor's enemies in the TARDIS to stop the Graak, such as Daleks, Cybermen, Autons, Ice Warriors, Quarks, Sea Devils, Silurians, Sontarans, Yeti and Zygons. The Graak is transported to each Doctor's version of the TARDIS to enter the Great Divide: a chasm which separates the TARDIS from the Determinant. The Graak avoids the foes and enters the Determinant to then save the seven Doctors. After seemingly freeing the seven incarnations of the Doctor, the Master reveals to the Graak that he has them all trapped outside of the Determinant and that he will leave the Determinant, destroying the TARDIS. The Graak sacrifices himself, by using his life force to free the Doctors. As the Master attempts to escape, he is captured by the creatures he teamed up with and pleads to the Graak and the Doctor to save him by with Siralos' energy as he is taken away.

== Development and release ==
A collaboration between BBC Multimedia and the British developer Studio Fish, Destiny of the Doctors is a CD-ROM which received an ELSPA classification indicating suitability for ages 11 and over. It is supported by Microsoft Windows 95 and works on all subsequent forms of Windows, though some PCs running XP and Vista experience compatibility issues. It was released in the United Kingdom, Ireland and Australia, as well as some countries in Europe, and found modest acclaim from some magazines, including the now defunct PC Planet.

The game featured extensive, newly recorded audio dialogue by Tom Baker, Peter Davison, Colin Baker, Sylvester McCoy and Nicholas Courtney. William Hartnell and Patrick Troughton were represented by impersonators performing the roles of the First and Second Doctors. Jon Pertwee originally agreed to appear in the game but died before recording could take place; by agreement with his widow, Ingeborg Pertwee, he was represented in the game using audio clips from the television series. The game marked Anthony Ainley's final appearance as the Master.

The story was written by longtime Doctor Who writer Terrance Dicks.

== Cast ==
- The Third Doctor – Jon Pertwee (archive audio)
- The Fourth Doctor – Tom Baker
- The Fifth Doctor – Peter Davison
- The Sixth Doctor – Colin Baker
- The Seventh Doctor – Sylvester McCoy
- The Master – Anthony Ainley
- Brigadier Lethbridge-Stewart – Nicholas Courtney

== Reception ==
The game received mixed reviews. In a 2011 retrospective feature for PC Gamer, Richard Cobbett described the game as part of a broader pattern of unsuccessful Doctor Who adaptations, arguing that the Doctor’s character lends itself more naturally to puzzle-solving and dialogue-driven gameplay than action-oriented mechanic. Additionally, Cobbett heavily praised Ainley's performance as the Master, but criticised the game's setting and other actors' performances.

In a retrospective article for Destructoid, Anthony Burch said the game was "one of the most unplayable, unenjoyable games ever created".

== Other releases ==
All of Ainley's recorded scenes as the Master from this game were included on the DVD release of Survival.
