= Survival (Doctor Who) =

155 – Survival
- Doctor Who serial
- Sylvester McCoy in a publicity photo for Survival

Cast
- Doctor: Sylvester McCoy – Seventh Doctor
- Companion: Sophie Aldred – Ace
- Others: Anthony Ainley – The Master; Lisa Bowerman – Karra; Julian Holloway – Paterson; David John – Derek; Will Barton – Midge; Sean Oliver – Stuart; Sakuntala Ramanee – Shreela; Gareth Hale – Len; Norman Pace – Harvey; Kate Eaton – Ange; Kathleen Bidmead – Woman; Adele Silva – Squeak; Michelle Martin – Neighbour

Production
- Directed by: Alan Wareing
- Written by: Rona Munro
- Script editor: Andrew Cartmel
- Produced by: John Nathan-Turner
- Music by: Dominic Glynn
- Production code: 7P
- Series: Season 26
- Running time: 3 episodes, 25 minutes each
- First broadcast: 22 November 1989
- Last broadcast: 6 December 1989

Chronology
← Preceded by The Curse of Fenric	Followed by → Doctor Who

Survival is the final serial of the 26th season of the British science fiction television series Doctor Who, which was first broadcast in three weekly parts on BBC1 from 22 November to 6 December 1989. It is the final story of the original 26-year run; the show did not return as a series until 2005. The story marks the final regular television appearances of Sylvester McCoy as the Seventh Doctor and Sophie Aldred as Ace, and the final television appearance of Anthony Ainley as the Master, appearing alongside McCoy's Doctor for the first and only time.

In the story, the Doctor brings Ace home to Perivale, where her friends have been transported to the planet of the Cheetah People.

== Plot ==
The Seventh Doctor brings Ace back home to Perivale in West London. Ace becomes worried when most of her friends seem to have disappeared, but the Doctor is preoccupied with a black cat called a Kitling he sees skulking about. The Kitling appears to be selecting people and transporting them to parts unknown. Ace finds herself being hunted down by a creature on horseback, which seems to be half-human, half-cheetah, which hunts with the Kitling. The Doctor and a fitness instructor called Paterson are transported to another world, where the Doctor is confronted by the Master.

The Master explains the situation: they are on a sentient planet, which has the power to transform the inhabitants into Cheetah People. The originally human inhabitants, which have since evolved into Cheetah People, used the kitlings as pets. The Master shows signs of transformation and needs the Doctor's help to escape from the planet.

Ace finds her friends Shreela and Midge hiding in the woods with a young man called Derek. A hunting pack attacks, and during the fight Midge kills one of the Cheetah People while Ace injures another, called Karra. She begins to form an attachment to Karra and treats her injuries, which causes the Doctor concern. Ace's eyes change and she begins to transform into a Cheetah.

Midge submits to the power of the planet and begins to transform. The Master uses Midge to transport both of them back to Earth. Ace helps the Doctor get back to Perivale, enabling Paterson, Derek and Shreela to flee the planet. The Doctor and Ace return to Perivale, where they find Midge and the Master have killed Paterson for sport. Midge is killed in the Master's machinations. Karra's arrival brings comfort to Ace, whose transformation is continuing, but the Master kills Karra.

The Master transports the Doctor with him back to the Cheetah Planet for a final conflict, but the Doctor resists the pull of the planet, turning away from violence, and is transported away from the dying world. However, the Master is trapped on the planet as it begins to break up. The Doctor has gone back to the TARDIS and Earth, where he retrieves Ace.

== Production ==
=== Writing ===
Broadcaster and cultural historian Matthew Sweet has described Survival as "a parable about Thatcherism" that shares multiple characteristics with the Tenth Doctor era. Writer Rona Munro approached script editor Andrew Cartmel at a BBC scriptwriting workshop and said that she'd "kill to write for Doctor Who." The story Munro developed incorporated themes including the morals of hunting (personified by the Cheetah People and signposted by Ace's friend Ange collecting for hunt saboteurs). The title Survival was chosen by Cartmel. Munro was disappointed by the realisation of the Cheetah People:

[They] should have just had cheetah eyes and a very faint pigmentation round of cheetah spots, and big canine teeth. And in fact, I think the actors that were cast, from what I was told, were doing all this wonderful expressive facial work, and then these 'Puss in Boots' things were dropped on them – and so then you can't see what they're doing under there. Particularly Karra and Ace, there were whole amazing scenes between them and for me, that was supposed to be my lesbian subtext – and you can't see it!

— Rona Munro, 2007 interview

=== Recording ===
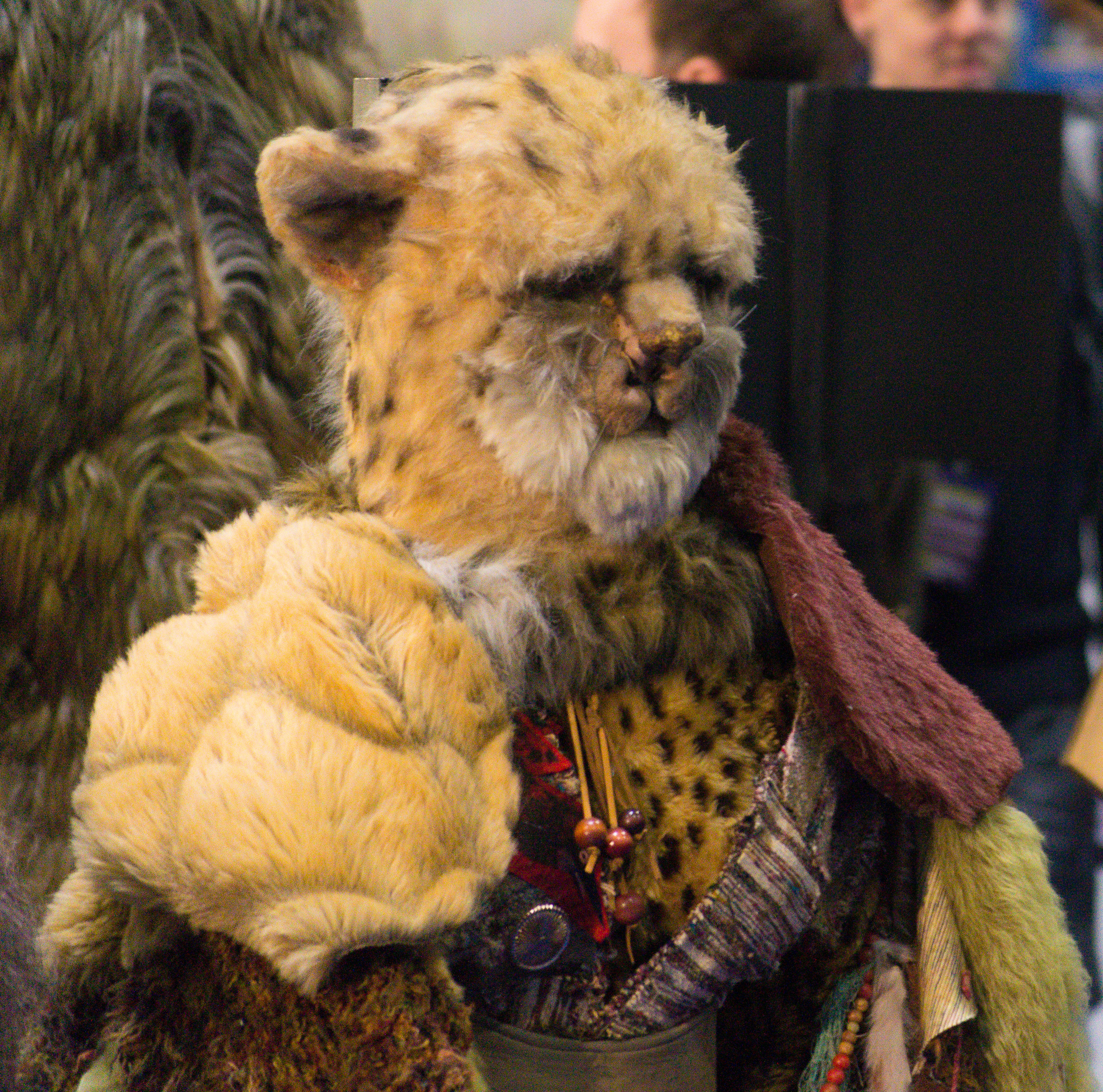
A Cheetah person costume at a Doctor Who exhibition

Survival was one of only a handful of Doctor Who serials to be recorded completely on BBC Outside Broadcast video, instead of the mix of OB and studio video that was more common during the late 1980s, and the mix of film and video that was usual before. The other stories to be recorded solely on OB video were: The Sontaran Experiment (1975), Delta and the Bannermen (1987), Silver Nemesis (1988) and The Curse of Fenric (1989).

It was almost 38 °C (100 °F) on the shooting days for the scenes on the planet of the Cheetah people. One of the extras removed her costume and simply walked off the set, causing delays while a replacement was found. The battle at the climax of the story was recorded and set on the site of the ancient hill fort at Horsenden Hill. The majority of location recording was done in and around Perivale, with small sections shot at nearby Ealing, and outside and near The Drayton Court pub.

=== Legacy ===
Having already surmised that episode three of Survival was likely to be the last episode of Doctor Who for some time, and possibly the last ever, the show's producer John Nathan-Turner decided close to transmission that a more suitable conclusion should be given to the final episode. Script editor Andrew Cartmel wrote a short, melancholic closing monologue for Sylvester McCoy, which McCoy recorded on 23 November 1989, the day after episode one was broadcast and, by coincidence, the show's twenty-sixth anniversary:

"There are worlds out there where the sky is burning, the sea's asleep, and the rivers dream. People made of smoke, and cities made of song. Somewhere there's danger, somewhere there's injustice, and somewhere else the tea's getting cold. Come on, Ace – we've got work to do!"

This was dubbed over the closing scene as the Doctor and Ace walked off into the distance, apparently to further adventures. Although Survival was the last Doctor Who serial of the original series to be transmitted, it was not the last to have been produced; that was Ghost Light, which had been broadcast some weeks earlier, as the second story of the season. The Doctor Who production office at the BBC finally closed down in August 1990, having been in continuous operation since 1963.

This story is the last to feature Anthony Ainley as the Master. Ainley was not asked to return as the Master for the 1996 Doctor Who television movie. Instead, Gordon Tipple was cast as the Master for the prologue and Eric Roberts played the Master for the rest of the movie. Ainley reprised the role of the Master for the 1997 computer game Destiny of the Doctors. He continued to be active in Doctor Who, attending conventions and recording a commentary track for the DVD of the 1981 serial The Keeper of Traken. Ainley died in May 2004.

McCoy and Aldred would reprise their roles onscreen on a number of occasions: first in a 1990 episode of the educational series Search Out Science; and again in 1993, along with many other former Doctor Who actors, for the Children in Need 30th anniversary special Dimensions in Time. McCoy would briefly return to the role for the 1996 Doctor Who television movie which saw the Seventh Doctor regenerate into the Eighth Doctor, played by Paul McGann, and again in 2021 for a webcast trailer promoting the Blu-ray release of Season 24 alongside Bonnie Langford as Mel Bush.

If the series continued, Aldred would have remained in her role until the expiry of her contract midway through the following season. Ace was to be written out of the series in Ice Time, an Ice Warrior story written by Marc Platt. Aldred returned as Ace in 2019 for a webcast trailer promoting the Blu-ray release of Season 26.

In 1999, McCoy agreed to reprise his role as the Doctor in officially licensed Doctor Who audio adventures produced by Big Finish, with Aldred also returning the following year. McCoy and Aldred continue to make regular appearances in Doctor Who audio releases and associated spin-offs. The pair also returned in 2001 for the BBC webcast production, Death Comes to Time.

Doctor Who eventually returned to television as a BBC Wales production in 2005, helmed by Russell T Davies. In 2022, Aldred made a special guest appearance as Ace in the revived series, alongside Janet Fielding as Tegan Jovanka, in The Power of the Doctor, which saw the end of Jodie Whittaker's tenure as the Thirteenth Doctor and was the last story produced entirely by BBC Studios before entering a co-production deal with Bad Wolf. McCoy also made a surprise cameo as a manifestation of the Seventh Doctor.

In 2023, as part of Doctor Who's sixtieth anniversary, McCoy and Aldred reprised their roles once again in the streaming series Tales of the TARDIS.

=== Cast notes ===
The part of Karra in this serial is played by Lisa Bowerman, who is now more familiar to fans as the voice of Bernice Summerfield in the Big Finish Productions audio dramas. She is also a director of many Big Finish productions, and also returned to the Doctor Who series proper when she provided voice-acting work for the animated special Dreamland in 2009.

This serial features guest appearances of the comedians Gareth Hale and Norman Pace, and actress Adele Silva (as an 8-year-old, in her first television role). See also Celebrity appearances in Doctor Who.

== Broadcast and reception ==
Episode	Title	Run time	Original release date	UK viewers (millions)	Appreciation Index
1	"Part One"	24:14	22 November 1989	5.0	69
2	"Part Two"	24:13	29 November 1989	4.8	69
3	"Part Three"	24:20	6 December 1989	5.0	71

There was no direct indication given to the public that this was to be the final regular instalment of Doctor Who; however, unlike previous years' final episodes, this one featured no announcement in the closing credits that the programme would return the following year.

Reviewing Survival, David J. Howe and Stephen James Walker described it as "a very good story", with a script that contains "highly imaginative and original concepts". They also expressed admiration for the special effects used for the Cheetah People's planet, calling them "superb electronic video effects". Ainley's performance was also praised, with the reviewers stating it was "deadly serious and implacably evil, but with occasional flashes of dark humour". While stating that it was "deeply regrettable" that the original series of Doctor Who had to end with Survival, they added "that it went out on such a high note is, however, something to be thankful for".

The serial was also positively received by Paul Cornell, Martin Day and Keith Topping, who praised Anthony Ainley's performance and considered the show to be "a great end to the series" with "an epic quality".

== Commercial releases ==
=== In print ===
Survival
- Author: Rona Munro
- Cover artist: Alister Pearson
- Series: Doctor Who book: Target novelisations
- Release number: 150
- Publisher: Target Books
- Publication date: 18 October 1990
- ISBN: 0-426-20352-6

A novelisation of this serial, written by Rona Munro, was published by Target Books in October 1990, making Munro the third woman to write a Doctor Who novelisation. A reprint edition was one of several possible books included with a 2008 issue of Doctor Who Magazine.

=== Home media ===
Survival was released on VHS in October 1995. It was released on DVD on 16 April 2007 as a 2-disc set. The serial was also released as part of the Doctor Who DVD Files collection, in issue 51, published 15 December 2010.

The story was released once more as part of the Doctor Who: The Collection Season 26 blu-ray box set released in 2020. It is the only story from season 26 not to have an alternate extended cut.

=== Soundtrack release ===
Doctor Who: Survival

Soundtrack album by Dominic Glynn
- Released: 15 September 2017
- Genre: Soundtrack
- Label: Silva Screen

Doctor Who soundtrack chronology
Doctor Who: The Daleks (2017)	Doctor Who: Survival (2017)	Doctor Who: Series 9 (2018)

The music from this serial, composed by Dominic Glynn, was first released on CD on 15 September 2017.

==== Track listing ====
All tracks are written by Dominic Glynn, except where noted.

No.	Title	Length
1.	"Doctor Who (Opening Theme)" (Ron Grainer arr. Keff McCulloch)
2.	"Car Wash, With Kitling"
3.	"Tin Cans, Stray Cats And Horses"
4.	"Cat Food"
5.	"Where Is Everyone?"
6.	"Tin Opener"
7.	"Park Chase, And The Alien Planet"
8.	"An Unexpected Pleasure"
9.	"Planet of the Cheetah People"
10.	"Two Pints"
11.	"Playing With Fire"
12.	"Valley of Cats"
13.	"The Living Planet"
14.	"We Shall Become Animals"
15.	"Ace And Karra"
16.	"Go Home"
17.	"I Will Be Free of It"
18.	"Come Hunting, Sister"
19.	"Midge and the Bad Cat Man"
20.	"On Horsenden Hill"
21.	"Tooth And Claw"
22.	"Run For Ever"
23.	"...And Somewhere Else The Tea's Getting Cold"
24.	"Doctor Who (Closing Theme)" (Ron Grainer arr. Keff McCulloch)
