= Battlefield (Doctor Who) =

152 – Battlefield
- Doctor Who serial

Cast
- Doctor: Sylvester McCoy – Seventh Doctor
- Companion: Sophie Aldred – Ace
- Others: Nicholas Courtney – Brigadier Lethbridge-Stewart; Angela Douglas – Doris Lethbridge-Stewart; Angela Bruce – Brigadier Winifred Bambera; Robert Jezek – Sergeant Zbrigniev; Dorota Rae – Flight Lieutenant Lavel; Paul Tomany – Major Husak; Noel Collins – Pat Rawlinson; June Bland – Elizabeth Rawlinson; James Ellis – Peter Warmsly; Ling Tai – Shou Yuing; Jean Marsh – Morgaine; Christopher Bowen – Mordred; Marcus Gilbert – Ancelyn; Marek Anton – The Destroyer; Stefan Schwartz – Knight Commander

Production
- Directed by: Michael Kerrigan
- Written by: Ben Aaronovitch
- Script editor: Andrew Cartmel
- Produced by: John Nathan-Turner
- Executive producer: None
- Music by: Keff McCulloch
- Production code: 7N
- Series: Season 26
- Running time: 4 episodes, 25 minutes each
- First broadcast: 6 September 1989
- Last broadcast: 27 September 1989

Chronology
← Preceded by The Greatest Show in the Galaxy	Followed by → Ghost Light

Battlefield is the first serial of the 26th season of the British science fiction television series Doctor Who, which was first broadcast in four weekly parts on BBC1 from 6 to 27 September 1989. It was the last to feature Nicholas Courtney as Brigadier Lethbridge-Stewart in the show.

In the serial, Morgaine (Jean Marsh), a sorceress from another dimension, summons the planet-devouring Destroyer (Marek Anton) in England, where she also seeks to take the sword Excalibur for herself. The plot is loosely based on Arthurian legend.

== Plot ==
In response to a distress signal, the Seventh Doctor and Ace materialise the TARDIS near Lake Vortigern in England, where a UNIT convoy led by Brigadier Winifred Bambera is transporting a nuclear missile. At the Gore Crow hotel, they meet a young woman called Shou Yuing and a knight, Ancelyn, who addresses the Doctor as "Merlin". The Doctor shows interest in a scabbard which hangs over the mantelpiece in the hotel. The party is surrounded by an ominous group of knights led by Mordred who leaves after recognising The Doctor as "Merlin". When Mordred begins an arcane ritual, the scabbard flies across the room, stirred by the magic. A sorceress, Morgaine, then arrives on the scene through a rift in space and time.

The next day, archaeologist Peter Warmsly shows the Doctor where he uncovered the scabbard. Under the lake, The Doctor and Ace find a ruined spaceship containing the body of King Arthur, lying next to a sword. When Ace removes the sword from its plinth, she activates a defence mechanism. The Doctor ejects Ace from the spaceship, sending her shooting up through the water, before the Doctor is rescued by Brigadier Lethbridge-Stewart.

Mordred and Morgaine go to the hotel to retrieve Excalibur. Meanwhile, the UNIT troops are staging an evacuation. Just as Mordred and Ancelyn are about to fight, the Doctor intervenes. Mordred reveals that the battle was a ruse to lure the Doctor, and that Morgaine has summoned the Destroyer of Worlds. The fighting between Morgaine's armies and the UNIT convoy continues, with UNIT victorious.

In an attempt to coerce Ace into surrendering Excalibur, Morgaine eases her control over the Destroyer, who begins to destroy the Hotel. The Doctor finds the hotel in ruins, but Ace and Shou Yuing safe. In the debris, the Doctor finds a portal to Morgaine's castle. On arrival, the Brigadier shoots the Destroyer, to no effect. Morgaine releases the Destroyer's silver bonds; afterwards she and Mordred escape without Excalibur back through the portal.

Lethbridge-Stewart, recalling a comment made by the Doctor, heads back into the castle armed with silver bullets. He confronts the Destroyer, and empties his revolver into the monster's chest, destroying it and Morgaine's castle. Despite the ominous destruction, Lethbridge-Stewart survives. They, with Ancelyn, return to the ship to use Excalibur to revive King Arthur, but discover a letter from "Merlin" that the King died in a final battle.

Back at the convoy, Morgaine and Mordred seize control of the nuclear missile in an attempt to set it off. The Doctor confronts Morgaine, tells her the dishonourable horror of the missile, and of Arthur's death. She relents, defeated, and she and Mordred are then imprisoned.

The group then return to Lethbridge-Stewart's home after the battle is over, but find that it is just beginning when Doris, Lethbridge-Stewart's wife takes Ace, Shou Yuing and Bambara out on the road.

== Production ==
Episode	Title	Run time	Original release date	UK viewers (millions)
1	"Part One"	24:06	6 September 1989	3.1
2	"Part Two"	24:07	13 September 1989	3.9
3	"Part Three"	24:13	20 September 1989	3.6
4	"Part Four"	24:14	27 September 1989	4.0

The story was repeated on BBC2 over four consecutive Fridays from 23 April – 14 May 1993, achieving viewing figures of 1.6, 1.2, 1.3, and 1.2 million respectively.

=== Pre-production ===
Working titles for this story included Storm Over Avallion. The early story outlines included the death of Lethbridge-Stewart.

In a deleted scene (included on the DVD release) the Doctor refers to one of Clarke's three laws — telling Ace that sufficiently advanced technology is indistinguishable from magic — to explain the various forms of magical attack used against them by the sorceress Morgaine, and also that Arthur's trans-dimensional spaceship was grown, not built. He adds that the reverse of Clarke's Law is also true.

=== Production ===
The first director approached to handle Battlefield was Graeme Harper, who had previously directed The Caves of Androzani and Revelation of the Daleks in 1984 and 1985 respectively. However, Harper was committed to the Central Independent Television drama series Boon, and unavailable to return to Doctor Who.

While recording a scene for the third episode, the glass on a water tank for a set piece cracked. Sophie Aldred, who was inside the tank, received minor injuries to her hands and the water caused an electrocution hazard as it spilled out near live wires. Sylvester McCoy shouted out to the stage hands above her to pull her quickly out before the tank exploded, cursing so that the stage hands would recognize that he wasn't ad libbing.

=== Cast notes ===
Nicholas Courtney returned explicitly as the Brigadier for the first time since "The Five Doctors" in 1983, Courtney's small cameo role in 1988's Silver Nemesis having been unidentified. Other guest stars making return appearances in Battlefield include Jean Marsh, who over twenty years earlier had played Princess Joanna in The Crusade and later, companion Sara Kingdom in The Daleks' Master Plan, which had been, coincidentally, Nicholas Courtney's first Doctor Who story; and June Bland, who appeared in the Fifth Doctor story Earthshock.

Angela Bruce later reprised the role of Brigadier Winifred Bambera in the audio play Animal.

== Commercial releases ==
=== In print ===
Battlefield
- Author: Marc Platt
- Cover artist: Alister Pearson
- Series: Doctor Who book: Target novelisations
- Release number: 152
- Publisher: Target Books
- Publication date: 18 July 1991
- ISBN: 0-426-20350-X

Marc Platt's novelisation was published by Target Books in July 1991. Its prologue features the future Merlin Doctor taking the wounded King Arthur aboard the spaceship beneath the lake following the last battle as well as additional information about UNIT and Morgaine's dimension. The final scene implies that the Brigadier is planning to go with Ancelyn back to the other dimension to help restore order, a similar plot point to the ending of the Eighth Doctor Adventures novel The Shadows of Avalon. It was the last novelisation of a televised Doctor Who serial to be published in the traditional "short paperback" format Target had been using since 1973. After one more novelisation based upon the audio story The Pescatons, novelisations were published in paperback editions with greater page counts and a different format.

An audiobook of the Target novelisation was released by BBC Audio on 5 May 2022, read by Toby Longworth.

=== Home media ===
Battlefield was released on VHS in March 1998 with two minutes of additional footage. It was released on Region 2 DVD on 26 December 2008 as a Special Edition featuring the original televised story plus a movie-length version featuring extended scenes and new special effects, with its scenes reedited into script order to clarify the story's themes and sequence of events. This serial was also released as part of the Doctor Who DVD Files in issue 59 on 6 April 2011.

The serial was released on blu-ray on 27 January 2020 as part of "The Collection - Season 26" box set. It features, not only the original TV broadcast episodes of Battlefield, but also the extended VHS release episodes as well as a special feature-length extended edition.
