= Nicholas Mallett =

British television director (1945–1997)

- Born: 6 May 1945; Norwich, Norfolk, England
- Died: 30 January 1997 (aged 51); Wandsworth, London, England
- Occupation: Television director

Nicholas Victor Patrick Mallett (6 May 1945 – 30 January 1997) was a British television director.

== Early life ==
He initially trained as a ballet dancer until an early illness forced him to consider other options. Given his theatrical background, Mallett went to work at the BBC in the music and arts department before moving into drama.

== Career ==
For the BBC, Mallett started as an assistant floor manager in the early seventies on shows such as The Troubleshooters and Warship. By 1975, he was promoted to production assistant with credits including Blake's 7. This was followed by becoming a production associate in 1980 before taking the BBC's internal directors' course in 1984.

As a director, he was responsible for three Doctor Who serials between 1986 and 1989: The Mysterious Planet starring Colin Baker, Paradise Towers and The Curse of Fenric (both starring Sylvester McCoy). He gave an interview in 1995 to Doctor Who Magazine, in which he discussed accidental and intentional cuts from The Curse of Fenric.

Mallett also directed episodes of Crossroads, Children's Ward and The Bill. He died in Wandsworth, London, in 1997, at the age of 51.
