= Tomasz Borkowy =

Polish actor

- Born: Tomasz Borkowy; 17 September 1952 (age 73); Warsaw, Poland
- Other names: Tomek Bork, Tom Bork, Tomeg Bork
- Occupation: Actor

Tomasz Karol Borkowy (born 17 September 1952, Warsaw, Poland) is a Polish actor, but has been working in the United Kingdom since the early 1980s. He often works under the name Tomek Bork and has had many film and television appearances.

He graduated from Theatre college in Kraków in 1977 and first came to the UK the following year, unable to speak English. Before this he had appeared in a number of Polish TV series and films. In 1982, during the martial law he moved to the UK permanently to continue his career. Since then he has appeared in the films The Unbearable Lightness of Being, Murder on the Moon and Tailspin: Behind the Korean Airliner Tragedy. Notable television appearances have included Doctor Who (The Curse of Fenric), The Bill, Love Hurts, Sleepers, Lovejoy and most recently, Doctors. He has also continued to work in Poland, where he is most well known for playing the lead role in the TV drama series, Dom (House) which ran for 7 series over 20 years (1980–2000). Borkowy has also starred in and produced a number of plays at the Edinburgh Festival Fringe for the past 18 years.

Borkowy now lives in Edinburgh, Scotland and southern Spain. He runs Universal Arts – an international agency and production company for performing arts, while still working as an actor.

== Filmography ==
Year	Title	Role	Notes
1978	Nie zaznasz spokoju	Long	
1978	Do krwi ostatniej	Stefan Kozicki	
1986	The Bill	Witos	Episode: Public and Confidential
1988	The Unbearable Lightness of Being	Jiri	
1988	Piece of Cake	'Zaddy' Zardarnowski	Miniseries
1989	Doctor Who	Captain Sorin	Episode: The Curse of Fenric
1991	Sleepers	Kremlin Radio Operator	Miniseries
1993	Lovejoy	Max	Episode: Taking the Pledge
1995	Taggart	Paul Smorawinksi	Episode: Prayer for the Dead Part One
2007	Doctors	Antek Denya	Episode: Evil Spirits
