= Seventh Doctor =

Fictional character from Doctor Who

The Doctor
The Seventh Doctor
- Doctor Who character
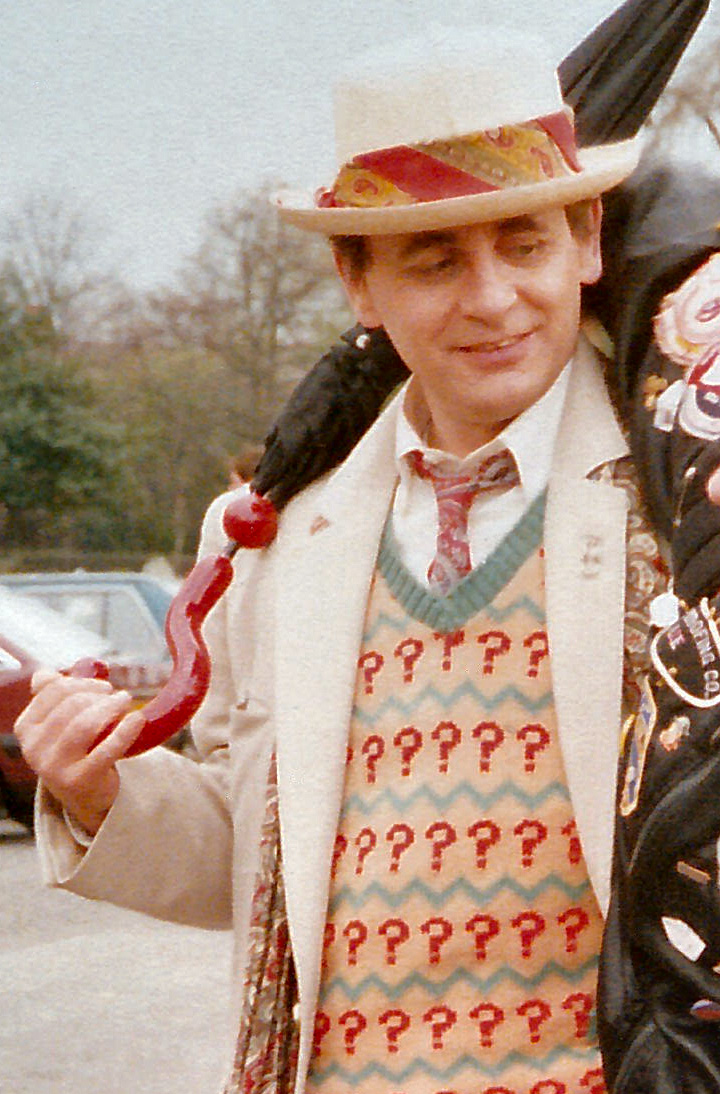
- Sylvester McCoy as the Seventh Doctor
- First regular appearance: Time and the Rani (1987)
- Last regular appearance: Survival (1989)
- Introduced by: John Nathan-Turner
- Portrayed by: Sylvester McCoy
- Preceded by: Colin Baker (Sixth Doctor)
- Succeeded by: Paul McGann (Eighth Doctor)

Information
- Tenure: 7 September 1987 – 6 December 1989
- No of series: 3
- Appearances: 12 stories (42 episodes)
- Companions: Mel Bush; Ace
- Chronology: Season 24 (1987); Season 25 (1988–1989); Season 26 (1989); TV film (1996); Specials (2022)

The Seventh Doctor is an incarnation of the Doctor, the protagonist of the British science fiction television series Doctor Who. He is portrayed by Scottish actor Sylvester McCoy.

Within the series' narrative, the Doctor is a centuries-old alien Time Lord from the planet Gallifrey who travels in time and space in the TARDIS, frequently with companions. At the end of life, the Doctor regenerates; as a result, the physical appearance and personality of the Doctor changes. Preceded in regeneration by the Sixth Doctor (Colin Baker), he is followed by the Eighth Doctor (Paul McGann).

McCoy portrays the Seventh Doctor as a whimsical, thoughtful character who quickly becomes more layered, secretive, and manipulative. His first companion was Melanie Bush (Bonnie Langford), a computer programmer who had travelled with his previous incarnation, and who is soon succeeded by troubled teenager and explosives expert Ace (Sophie Aldred), who becomes his protégée.

The Seventh Doctor first appeared on television in 1987. After the programme was cancelled at the end of 1989, his adventures continued in novels until the late 1990s though he did make televised appearances in “Search Out Space” in 1990 and Dimensions in Time in 1993. The Seventh Doctor made an appearance at the start of the 1996 film before the character regenerated into the Eighth Doctor (Paul McGann).

== Overview ==
In his first season, the Seventh Doctor started out as a comical character, engaging in dundrearyisms ("Time and tide melt the snowman," or when partner Mel is kidnapped, "A bird in the hand keeps the Doctor away"), playing the spoons, and making pratfalls, but later started to develop a darker nature. The Seventh Doctor era is noted for the cancellation of Doctor Who after 26 years. It is also noted for the Virgin New Adventures, a range of original novels published from 1991 to 1997, taking the series beyond the television serials.

The Seventh Doctor's final appearance on television was in the 1996 Doctor Who television movie, where he regenerated into the Eighth Doctor, played by Paul McGann. A sketch of him is later seen in John Smith's A Journal of Impossible Things in the new series 2007 episode "Human Nature". Brief archive clips of the Seventh Doctor appeared as holographic representations in "The Next Doctor" (2008), "The Eleventh Hour" (2010), the 50th anniversary special "The Day of the Doctor" (2013) and "Twice Upon a Time" (2017), and as flashbacks in "The Name of the Doctor" (2013). An aged Seventh Doctor also appeared in two forms in "The Power of the Doctor" (2022).

== Biography ==
When the TARDIS was attacked by The Rani, the Sixth Doctor was injured and forced to regenerate. After a brief period of post-regenerative confusion and amnesia (chemically induced by the Rani), the Seventh Doctor thwarted the Rani's plans, and rejoined his companion Mel for whimsical adventures in an odd tower block and a Welsh holiday camp in the 1950s.

On the planet Svartos, Mel decided to leave the Doctor's company for that of intergalactic rogue Sabalom Glitz. Also at this time, the Doctor was joined by time-stranded teenager Ace. Although he did not mention it at the time, the Doctor soon recognised that an old enemy from a past adventure, the ancient entity known as Fenric, was responsible for the Time Storm which transported Ace from 1980s Perivale to Svartos in the distant future. Growing more secretive and driven from this point on, the Doctor took Ace under his wing and began teaching her about the universe, all the while keeping an eye out for Fenric's plot.

The Doctor began taking a more scheming and proactive approach to defeating evil, using the Gallifreyan stellar manipulator named the Hand of Omega as part of an elaborate trap for the Daleks which resulted in the destruction of their home planet, Skaro. Soon afterwards, the Doctor used a similar tactic and another Time Lord relic to destroy a Cyberman fleet. He engineered the fall of the oppressive government of a future human colony in a single night and encountered the Gods of Ragnarok at a circus on the planet Segonax, whom he had apparently fought throughout time. Later, he was reunited with his old friend, Brigadier Lethbridge-Stewart while battling the forces of an alternate dimension on Earth.

The Seventh Doctor's manipulations were not reserved for his rivals. With the goal of helping Ace confront her past, he took her to a Victorian house in her home town of Perivale in 1883 which she had burned down in 1983. Eventually, the Doctor confronted and defeated Fenric at a British naval base during World War II, revealing Fenric's part in Ace's history. The Doctor continued to act as Ace's mentor, returning her to Perivale; however, she chose to continue travelling with him. The circumstances of her parting from the Doctor were not shown on television.

Near the end of his incarnation, the Seventh Doctor was given the responsibility of transporting the remains of his former enemy the Master from Skaro to Gallifrey. This proved to be a huge mistake; despite having a limited physical form, the Master was able to take control of the Doctor's TARDIS and cause it to land in 1999 San Francisco, where the Doctor was shot in the middle of a gang shoot-out. He was taken to a hospital, where surgeons removed the bullets but mistook the Doctor's double heartbeat for fibrillation; their attempt to save his life instead caused the Doctor to "die" with one last shocking scream. He is thus the only Doctor to have died at the (unwitting) hand of one of his own companions. Perhaps due to the anaesthesia, the Doctor did not regenerate immediately after death, unlike all previous occasions; he finally did so several hours later, while lying in the hospital's morgue.

An aged Seventh Doctor appeared as one of the "Guardians of the Edge" in an afterlife, inside the Doctor's mind in the final Thirteenth Doctor special, to the Thirteenth Doctor as well as being a hologram programmed by the Doctor herself in ("The Power of the Doctor"). He also appeared as a hologram to an older Ace and she forgave him for everything that happened.

In Tales of the TARDIS, he reunited with an older Ace and discussed their adventures. They also discussed the meeting with Fenric and both apologised to each other falling out. He also told her she had to leave to become who she is and expressed his love for her as a daughter-figure. They then decided to take one more trip across time and space.

In Time and the Rani (1987), the Seventh Doctor gives his age soon after his regeneration as "exactly" 953 years, indicating that some two centuries of subjective time has passed since his fourth incarnation was revealed to be 756 in The Ribos Operation (1978), and approximately half a century since Revelation of the Daleks (1985) in which the Sixth Doctor stated he was 900 years old. The later revival of the series, however, contradicts earlier episodes by establishing the Ninth Doctor as being 900 years old in "Aliens of London" (2005).

== Personality ==
The Seventh Doctor is noted for a significant development in characterisation over his tenure. In his early stories, he is portrayed as an eccentric and somewhat bumbling figure whose actions often place him in danger, while retaining a high level of intelligence and benevolent intent. In later stories, the character is depicted as more strategic and secretive, with storylines emphasizing long-term planning and manipulation of events and other characters across time and space.

Early in this incarnation, the Doctor is generally presented as affable, curious and easygoing. As the era progresses, the portrayal places greater emphasis on seriousness, introspection and secrecy, with the Doctor withholding information about his plans and personal history. This later interpretation presents a more authoritative and manipulative figure, creating an impression of undisclosed knowledge and motives.

As something of a showman, the Doctor would sometimes act like a buffoon, usually preferring to manipulate events from behind the scenes; much like his second incarnation, he was prepared to play the fool to trick his foes into underestimating him, inevitably leading to their defeat at his hands. He was an adept physical performer and deployed a repertoire of magic tricks, illusions and escape artistry to this effect as part of his plans. Although his more obvious whimsical tendencies disappeared over time (particularly his spoons-playing), he maintained a fondness for idiosyncratic speeches that occasionally referred to literature, ordinary places and even food and drink amidst the weightier concerns on his mind. He was empathetic to his friends (and even his enemies, such as Helen A) and somewhat melancholic at times (such as during Mel's departure and before his decision to eradicate the Daleks) but now placed greater burdens upon himself in the name of protecting the universe. This may have led him to shroud his true intentions in mystery and the use of sleight of hand as befit his fondness for performance, in effect, subverting his more lighthearted qualities to complement and enhance his heroic and darker ones.

Given the Seventh Doctor's appearance and stature, he was surprisingly capable of both directly and indirectly taking control of situations involving strangers, using his greater intelligence to assess and direct events. Concerned with the bigger picture, he would sometimes overlook the finer details and his planning (both prepared and improvised) would sometimes have fatal results and consequences. When he acted to end threats, it was usually a ruthless, destructive and final manoeuvre. He was also not above hiding the truth from his friends and allies and using them to complete his schemes and gambits.

His tendency to reveal only select information to his companion Ace – as well as anyone else around them – was used both in her education and in their adventures, as if he were the only one who should know all the answers and others should come to their own conclusions. At two points he even abused Ace's trust in him, once to develop her as a person and again to keep her alive (on both occasions, freeing her from the evil influences that had haunted her during her life), while on one of these adventures, he showed great difficulty in admitting his foreknowledge of the situation's severity to her when she finally confronted him. In spite of his immense fondness for her, and hers for him, he often frustrated her with his secretive nature as his alien behaviour, the great importance of his objectives (especially his focus on obliterating enemies from his past) and his strong desire to both educate and protect her would lead him to keep even her in the dark and would even subordinate her feelings towards him to succeed in their battles. Their close, almost familial bond was likely what helped Ace in moving past the feelings of betrayal she sometimes felt towards the Doctor, particularly as he genuinely had her best interests at heart. In fact, while he appeared to be an unassuming figure, fond of performing magic tricks and displaying notable showmanship, the Seventh Doctor was actually quite powerful and calculating, for he would use his friends and foes alike as pawns in his elaborate chess game against "evil". As Ace herself put it, he was "well devious".

In direct contrast to his third incarnation, this Doctor was absolutely opposed to violence of any sort (as demonstrated in stories such as Battlefield, where he stops a battle merely by ordering the warriors to desist) and he was totally against the use of firearms (to the extent of 'talking down' a soldier ordered to execute him in The Happiness Patrol by emphasising the easiness of the kill versus the enormity of ending a life), although he also proved capable of rendering a man unconscious with a touch (Battlefield, Survival). In keeping with his established habits, he would use gadgetry of his own invention when the situation called for it, but never as his final gambit. Instead, he almost always managed to talk his enemies into submission, often into suicide – perhaps most memorably in Remembrance of the Daleks, where he taunts the seemingly last Dalek in existence until it self-destructs, or in Ghost Light, where he defeats the dangerously unstable Light by ramming home the folly of trying to prevent evolution (he employs variations of this 'talk to death' tactic in Dragonfire, Silver Nemesis and The Curse of Fenric, although primarily to manipulate opponents to guarantee the outcome in his favour).

This Doctor also displays strange and 'alien' characteristics playing with the perception of his senses, as he smells an apple and listens to cheese in Survival, and listens to an apple briefly in Delta and the Bannermen. He also displayed a talent for hypnosis on various occasions that appeared to be much stronger than in past incarnations (Battlefield). The Greatest Show in the Galaxy shows him to be a capable entertainer, performing a variety of well known magic tricks. In Ghost Light, he reveals his pet peeves to be burnt toast, bus stations, unrequited love, tyranny, and cruelty.

== Costume ==
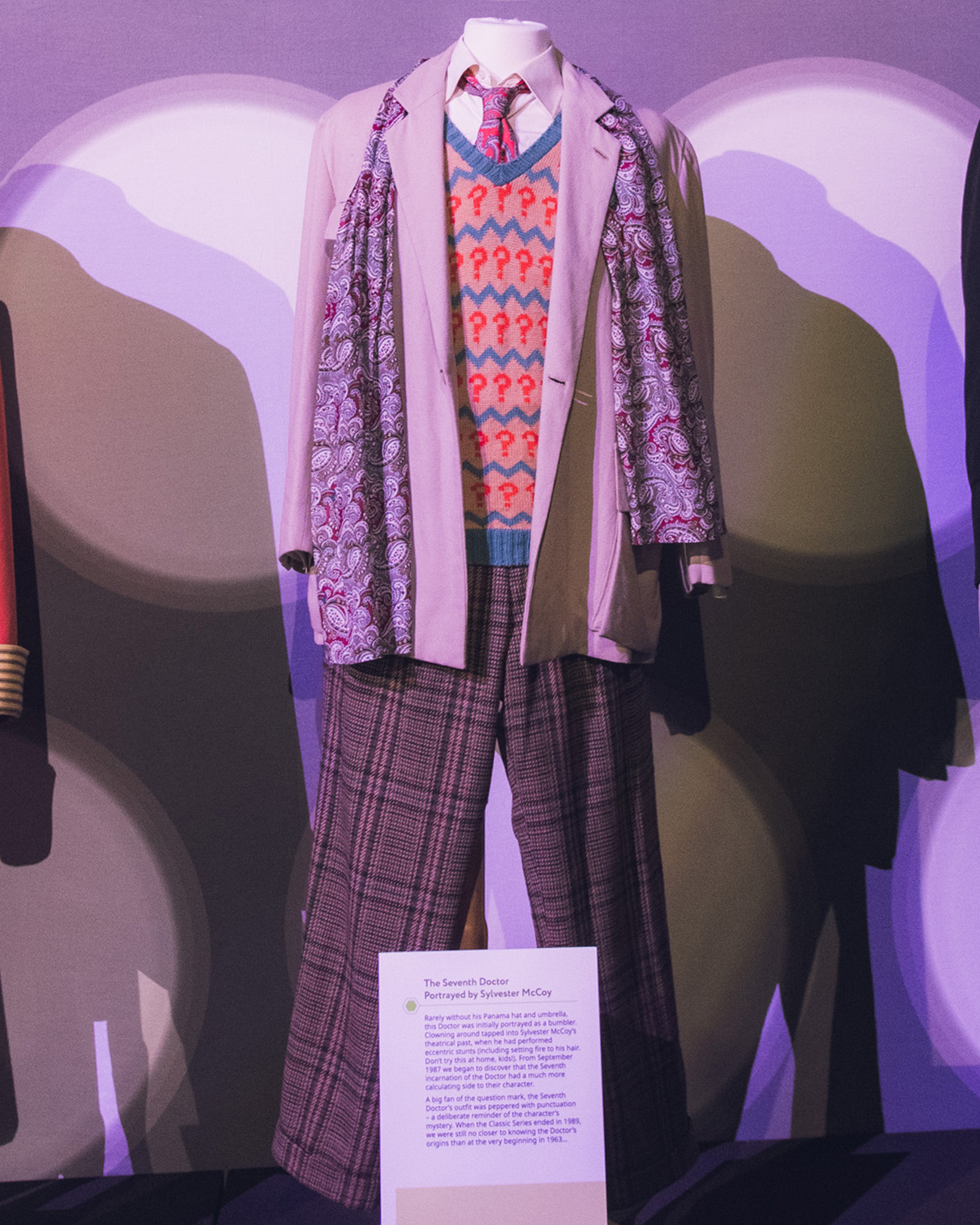
The Seventh Doctor's costume

The Doctor's outfit in this incarnation was calmer than his previous attire, but as idiosyncratic as any other. It consisted of a silver grey blazer with a crimson paisley scarf worn under its lapels and a matching handkerchief in the left pocket, a fob watch chained to the left lapel, a plain white shirt, a scarlet paisley tie, a beige fair isle-themed sweater vest adorned with cherry question marks and turquoise zigzag patterns, sand-brown tweed plaid trousers, beige brogued spectator shoes, a cream colonial-styled Panama cap with a scarlet paisley hatband, an upturned brim and a black umbrella with a cherry question mark-shaped handle. As with the three other Doctors costumed during the John Nathan-Turner era, the above-mentioned question marks on the Doctor's sweater vest and his umbrella handle continued the cherry-question-marked clothing motif that was introduced in the Fourth Doctor's final season and ended before the Seventh Doctor's regeneration.

Although a seemingly casual outfit that reflected the Seventh Doctor's initially easy and whimsical manner, it took on a new light when he became more scheming and prepared in his missions – to reflect the emergence of his personality's more mysterious and darker aspects, his blazer, hatband, handkerchief, scarf and tie became more muted and darker in colour, now in shades of burgundy and brown. In the New Adventures novels, images of the Doctor on the covers usually omitted the sweater vest and eventually depicted him in a cream single breasted suit. On a DVD featurette ("Light in Dark Places") for Ghost Light, when drawing attention to the stylistic choice of performing in most of the serial without his hat and umbrella, Sylvester McCoy expresses some disdain for the garment, feeling it detracts somewhat from the mood of the story. The changes in colours make the Seventh the only Doctor under Nathan-Turner's tenure to greatly alter his costume; the changes to the outfits worn by his three previous selves during this production period tended to be more subtle and less noteworthy. The Seventh's own attire was repeatedly revised during his first season, initially including a crimson/black tartan scarf and burgundy braces, along with the whangee bamboo-handle umbrella.

The Seventh Doctor's TV Movie costume.

In the TV movie the Doctor's costume changed again, with a return to a lighter blazer, now a light brown Herringbone-tweed blazer. Gone were the question mark sweater vest, paisley tie and question mark umbrella, replaced by a vermilion paisley waistcoat and a bronze/ebony herringbone tie; joined by a maroon scarf. However, the Doctor retained his Panama hat.

The Doctor enjoyed using his hat, umbrella and the TARDIS key, amongst other items, as physical props, usually as showy affectations or to command attention, while the umbrella could also be used to disarm and trip foes (Paradise Towers, Battlefield, Ghost Light, Survival). Like most of his previous selves, the Seventh carried any number of random items in his pockets, including technological devices and books (Dragonfire, Ghost Light). In a break from his past however, he spoke with a mild Scottish accent with rolled Rs, rather than in his past selves' Received Pronunciation speaking patterns.

== Story style ==
In Season 24, the Seventh Doctor era began with a light-hearted approach, with stories like Delta and the Bannermen clearly aimed at a younger audience. However, in the final two seasons with Andrew Cartmel as script editor, the stories soon explored the true nature of the Doctor, hinting at dark secrets in his past. In Silver Nemesis, Lady Peinforte hints she knows the Doctor's secret of being more than just a Time Lord (deleted scenes in Remembrance of the Daleks and Survival also refer to this). Remembrance has the Doctor use "we" when referring to early Gallifreyan time travel experiments. Ace also became the focus of a dedicated character arc that was seeded from her introduction onwards and prominently played out during Season 26.

With the cancellation of the series, these developments were never fully played out in the television series, but some of them were revealed in the New Adventures.

Marc Platt's novel Lungbarrow is usually considered to be the conclusion of the "Cartmel Masterplan". In that novel, the Doctor is revealed to be the reincarnation of "the Other", a shadowy figure and contemporary of Rassilon and Omega from Ancient Gallifrey. Lungbarrow was originally intended for Season 26, but producer John Nathan-Turner felt that it revealed too much of the Doctor's origins. It was reworked to become Ghost Light instead.

According to McCoy and Cartmel, a number of Seventh Doctor stories were intended to satirise or protest the rule of then Prime Minister Margaret Thatcher. McCoy told the Sunday Times in 2010, "The idea of bringing politics into Doctor Who was deliberate, but we had to do it very quietly and certainly didn't shout about it...We were a group of politically motivated people and it seemed the right thing to do. At the time Doctor Who used satire to put political messages out there in the way they used to do in places like Czechoslovakia. Our feeling was that Margaret Thatcher was far more terrifying than any monster the Doctor had encountered. Those who wanted to see the messages saw them; others, including one producer, didn't." One story mentioned as having an anti-Thatcher theme was The Happiness Patrol in which the tyrannical Helen A outlawed unhappiness and remarked "I like your initiative, your enterprise" as her secret police rounded up dissidents. The Doctor persuaded "the drones", who toiled in the factories and mines, to down tools and rise up in revolt, an echo of the miners' strikes and printers' disputes during Thatcher's first two terms in office. Cartmel assembled several "angry young writers" such as Ben Aaronovitch and Rona Munro to produce storylines that they hoped would foment anti-Thatcher dissent.

== Other appearances ==
=== Television ===
The Seventh Doctor and Ace appeared twice on television between the time Doctor Who was cancelled and the 1996 television movie. The first was in 1990, in a special crossover episode of the BBC2 educational programme Search Out Science called “Search Out Space”. In this episode, the Doctor acted as a quiz show host, asking questions about astronomy; Ace, K-9 and "Cedric, from the planet Glurk" were the contestants. The Seventh Doctor then appeared in the 1993 charity special Dimensions in Time. A picture of the Seventh Doctor appears briefly in the Tenth Doctor story "Human Nature" (2007), in John Smith's A Journal of Impossible Things, and visions of him appear briefly in "The Next Doctor" (2008), "The Eleventh Hour" (2010), "Nightmare in Silver" and "The Name of the Doctor" (both 2013), "The Magician's Apprentice" (2015), "Twice Upon a Time" (2017), "The Timeless Children" (2020), "Rogue" (2024), "Wish World" (2025) and "The Reality War" (2025). He also appeared in the 50th anniversary special "The Day of the Doctor" (2013) helping his past and future incarnations save Gallifrey from the Time War, and an image of an aged Seventh Doctor appeared in a transitional quasi-afterlife to the Thirteenth Doctor as well as being mimicked in an AI hologram programmed by the Doctor herself in "The Power of the Doctor" (2022). The Seventh Doctor also made a cameo appearance during the Opening Ceremony of the 2026 Commonwealth Games, struggling to find the TARDIS after Sir Chris Hoy and Greg McHugh stole it.

=== Novels ===
Following the end of the TV series, the adventures of Doctor Who were continued in the Virgin New Adventures. The Seventh Doctor was the subject of 60 of these between 1991 and 1997. The Virgin novels pit the Seventh Doctor against the powerful Timewyrm, a complex plan to change history by his old enemy the Monk, facing the renegade time traveler Kadiatu Lethbridge-Stewart, a mysterious psychic brotherhood and their role in Earth's history, and culminates in a return to his family home on Gallifrey that reveals details about how the Doctor left Gallifrey in the first place. These novels also introduce original companions Professor Bernice Summerfield (who proves so popular that she acquires her own spin-off series), Roslyn Forrester, and Chris Cwej.

His adventures also appeared in the BBC Past Doctor Adventures novels. Some of these are stand-alone stories, but authors Robert Perry and Mike Tucker created a miniseries that explores the Doctor's discovery that Ace is destined to die in her immediate future and the Doctor's attempts to prevent it (as well as a confrontation with his foe the Valeyard), setting up a complex confrontation with the twisted psychopath George Limb who abuses time-travel to avoid his fate of becoming a Cyberman.

=== Audio ===
The Seventh Doctor has featured in dozens of audio dramas. Storylines in these audios include his travels with Ace and nurse Thomas Hector 'Hex' Schofield (the son of a young woman that the Sixth Doctor failed to save, who was particularly close to his then-companion Evelyn Smythe); his attempts to reform Elizabeth Klein, a Nazi officer from an alternate timeline, and his later interaction with her other self from this reality; and the return of Mel as she travels with him and Ace.

=== Online ===
Sylvester McCoy reprised the role of the Seventh Doctor in 2021 for a trailer promoting the Season 24 Blu-ray release alongside Bonnie Langford as Mel.

== Reception ==
McCoy's first season as the Doctor, Season 24, received poor reviews at the time from a faction of the series' fans, though this was a consequence of the bitterness and division in the fan culture about the series' treatment by the BBC since the 1985 hiatus and McCoy's predecessor, Colin Baker, being unfairly dismissed. Furthermore, the BBC choosing to schedule the series opposite Coronation Street throughout McCoy's tenure gave the impression that the corporation had "lost interest in Doctor Who [and] deliberately scheduled it in a slot where it was almost bound to fail to attract a significant audience, with a view to cancelling it at the first opportunity. In this context, the fact that the series survived as long as it did represents a considerable achievement in its own right." Many acclaimed the series finding a fresh style and abandoning its obsession with its existing continuity and returning foes. Mainstream reviews at the time tended to be positive: Minette Marrin, television critic for the Daily Telegraph, responded favourably to McCoy's debut, Time and the Rani: "The new script is self-consciously whimsical, almost self-parodying: perhaps this odd little genre, like all art forms, is pushing in its late maturity against its own boundaries." Alan Coren, writing for the Mail on Sunday in November 1988, wrote of Silver Nemesis: "Not only is the Doctor a modern mega-Merlin ... but the scrapes into which he gets himself are the scrapes of the imminent now. They could just happen, and the fringe of believability is where magic is most potent. If you can bend relativity and set once-upon-a-time in a time that has not yet happened then the possibilities are, literally, endless."

By the end of the twenty-fifth season, The Scotsman remarked of The Greatest Show in the Galaxy, "Who has gone imaginative and very stylish and there is a lot of galactic go in the old police box yet." The Independent called Ghost Light the best Doctor Who story of the decade. Paul Cornell, a writer for the New Adventures range of novels and the BBC Wales series, named the eras of Peter Davison and McCoy his two favourites in Doctor Who Magazine, saying of the latter: "Sylvester, from about Delta and the Bannermen, being beautiful and shy and sweet and kind again really dragged me back into Doctor Who and I loved the fact that somebody was taking the Doctor back into a different direction. So those are my two defining eras really, Davison and Sylvester." Seasons 25 and 26 were regarded as two of the best seasons in the series' run, with Remembrance of the Daleks, The Greatest Show in the Galaxy, Ghost Light, The Curse of Fenric, and Survival particularly commended. Lance Parkin wrote in 2003, "Very few Doctor Who fans needed Sounds magazine to tell us Remembrance of the Daleks was the best Doctor Who story in a long, long time ... It reminded people just how good Doctor Who had been, and just how good it could be again."

In 1990, readers of Doctor Who Magazine voted McCoy's Doctor "Best Doctor", over perennial favourite Tom Baker. A 1998 35th anniversary poll ranked Remembrance of the Daleks the sixth best TV story. In 2003 for the 40th anniversary The Curse of Fenric and Remembrance of the Daleks were both in the top ten, In a 2014 DWM poll of the entire series, Remembrance of the Daleks ranked tenth. For the 60th anniversary in 2023, using different selection criteria, ' 'Remembrance of the Daleks' ' finished in ninth place.

== See also ==
- History of Doctor Who – the 1980s
