= Sylvester McCoy =

Scottish actor (born 1943)

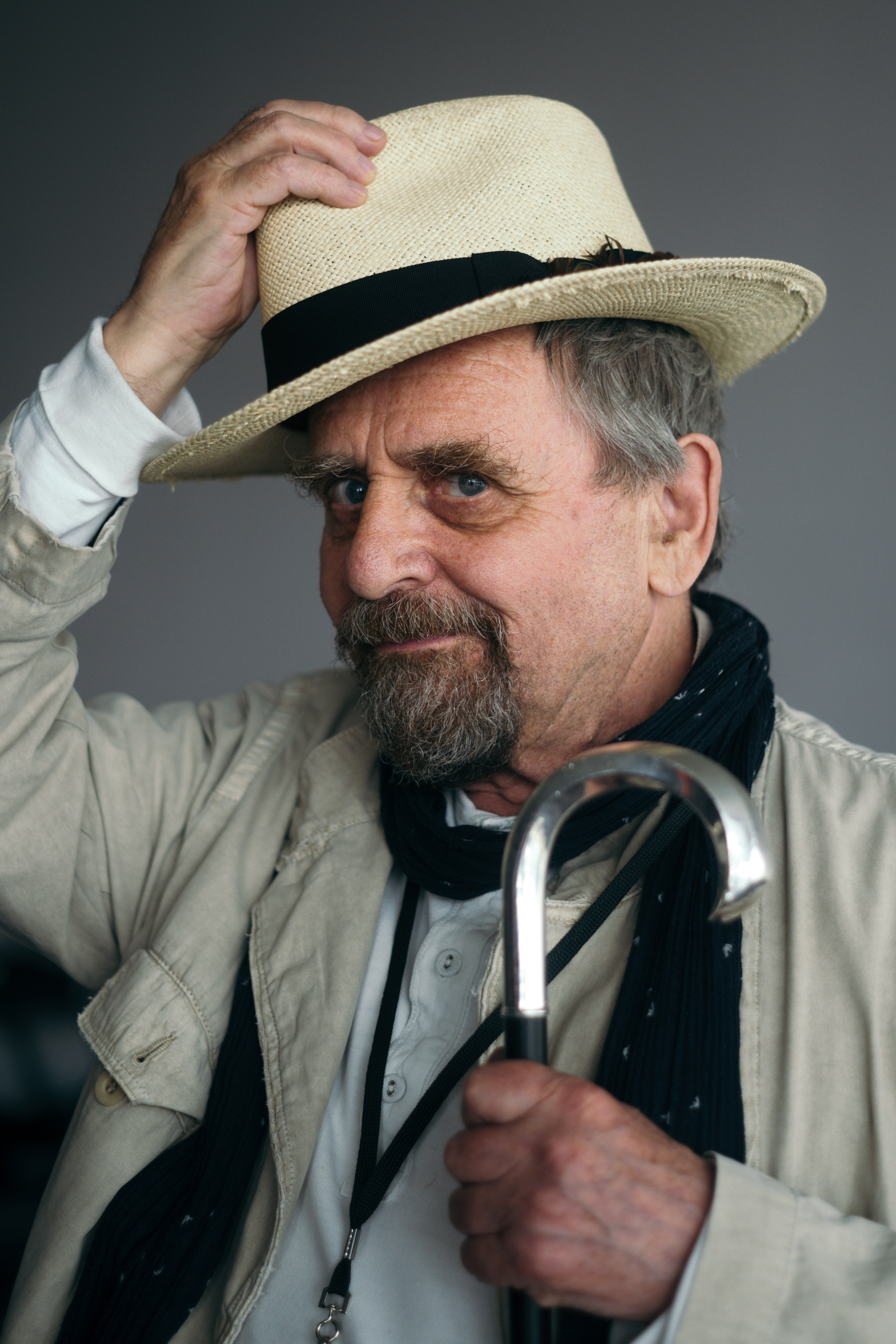
- McCoy in 2018
- Born: Percy James Patrick Kent-Smith; 20 August 1943 (age 83); Dunoon, Argyll, Scotland
- Other names: Sylvester McCoy; Sylveste McCoy; Kent Smith
- Education: Blairs College
- Occupations: Actor; physical comedian
- Years active: 1964–present
- Spouse: Agnes Verkaik
- Children: 2
- Website: sylvestermccoy.tv

Percy James Patrick Kent-Smith (born 20 August 1943), known professionally as Sylvester McCoy, is a Scottish actor. Gaining prominence as a physical comedian, he portrayed the seventh incarnation of the Doctor in the BBC science fiction series Doctor Who from 1987 to 1989—the final Doctor of the classic series—and reprised the role in the televised stories Dimensions in Time (1993), Doctor Who (1996) and "The Power of the Doctor" (2022). He also portrayed the wizard Radagast in The Hobbit film series (2012–2014).

== Early life and education ==
McCoy was born Percy James Patrick Kent-Smith on 20 August 1943 in Dunoon, Scotland, to an Irish mother, Molly Sheridan, and an English father, Percy James Kent-Smith. His father enlisted into the Navy in World War II and was killed in a battle off Sierra Leone in April 1943. McCoy's mother suffered a mental breakdown when he was eight years old, and was institutionalised thereafter. McCoy was brought up by his grandmother and aunts. He was unaware of his full legal name until he was eleven; prior to adopting his stage name, he was known as "Kent" or "James".

McCoy attended Saint Mun's School, a local Catholic school where he was an altar boy. A local priest's vocational presentation at Saint Mun's sparked his interest in the priesthood. He was also attracted to the profession partly by the appeal of "dressing up". From the age of 12, he trained for the priesthood at Blairs College, a seminary in Aberdeen. On reaching 17 years of age, McCoy was too young to join a Dominican order of monks and had to return to school to finish his education. He continued his education at Dunoon Grammar School, a co-ed school, where he "decided [he] didn't want to wear a skirt – [he] wanted to chase skirt instead"; McCoy quit his religious career.

At 18, McCoy moved to London, where his father's family lived, and started working in the insurance industry. He grew to dislike the job, and after the company went bust, he started working in the box office of the Roundhouse, a performing arts venue in Chalk Farm.

== Career ==
=== Early work (1964–1986) ===
While working at the Roundhouse, McCoy became friendly with actor Brian Murphy, whose wife was the venue's assistant administrator. The two men developed comedy bits to entertain patrons in the queues. Around 1970, Murphy recommended McCoy to theatre director Ken Campbell, who visited the Roundhouse looking for a new actor to join his touring experimental theatre troupe The Ken Campbell Roadshow. Although McCoy had no acting experience, he traveled to Manchester to join the troupe.

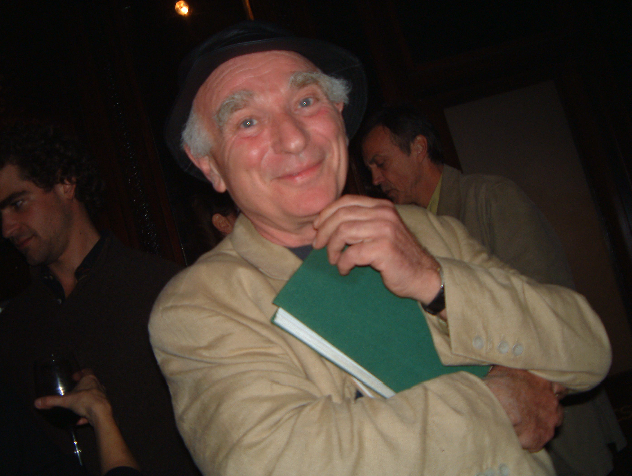
McCoy began his acting career in Ken Campbell's comedy troupe.

McCoy performed in pubs and clubs as a member of The Ken Campbell Roadshow. In his act An Evening with Sylvester McCoy: The Human Bomb, he portrayed a strongman character named "Sylveste McCoy" (later revised to "Sylvester McCoy") who performed antics such as stuffing ferrets down his trousers and hammering nails up his nose. The forename originated from The Wolfe Tones' cover of "Big Strong Man", which describes a strongman named "Sylveste", and he took the surname from the phrase "The real McCoy". The programme notes jokingly listed the character as played by Sylvester McCoy. Conscious that he may need to distinguish himself from the American actor Kent Smith as his career progressed, he adopted the stage name. Canadian critic Milton Shulman believed McCoy's name and fictionalised biography were genuine in his review of the Roadshow.

McCoy was invited by director Joan Littlewood to take part in further theatre productions, and over the next few years McCoy worked extensively across stage and screen. McCoy played Pepe/Epep, a character who lived in the mirror in Vision On. McCoy also portrayed, in one-man shows on the stage, two famous movie comedians: Stan Laurel and Buster Keaton. While playing Laurel, who had adopted his stage name due to the perceived bad luck of his real name containing thirteen letters, McCoy realised his stage name also had thirteen letters and added an "r" to the end of "Sylveste". He also appeared as Henry "Birdie" Bowers in the 1985 television serial about Scott's last Antarctic expedition, The Last Place on Earth (1985).

McCoy starred opposite Laurence Olivier and Donald Pleasence in the horror film Dracula (1979).

=== Doctor Who (1987–1989) ===
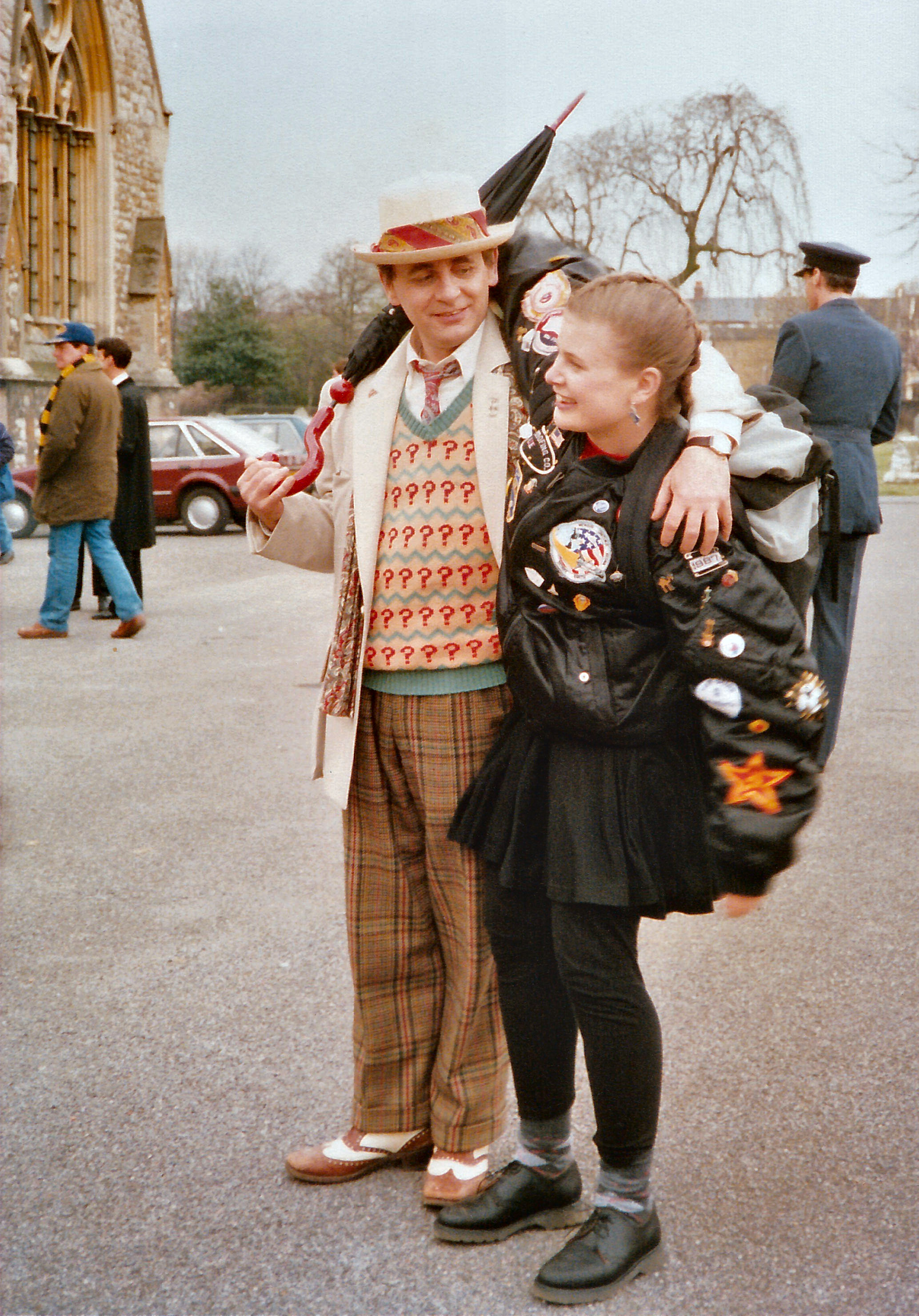
McCoy with Sophie Aldred during filming of Remembrance of the Daleks (1988)

McCoy became the Seventh Doctor after taking over the lead role in Doctor Who in 1987 from Colin Baker. He remained on the series until it ended in 1989, ending with Survival (his twelfth and final serial as the Doctor). As Baker declined the invitation to film the regeneration scene, McCoy briefly wore a wig and appeared, face-down until the last moment before the regeneration commenced as the Sixth Doctor, with his face concealed by regeneration special effects.

In his first season, McCoy used his background in physical comedy to portray the character with a degree of clown-like humour, but script editor Andrew Cartmel soon changed that when fans argued that the character (and plots) were becoming increasingly lightweight. The Seventh Doctor developed into a much darker figure than any of his earlier incarnations, manipulating people like chess pieces and always seeming to be playing a deeper game. A distinguishing feature of McCoy's performances was his manner of speech, using his natural Scottish accent and rolling his rs. In 1990, readers of Doctor Who Magazine voted McCoy "Best Doctor", over perennial favourite Tom Baker.

==== Later involvement with Doctor Who ====
McCoy played the Doctor in the 1993 charity special Dimensions in Time, and again in 1996, appearing in the beginning of the Doctor Who television movie starring Paul McGann as the Eighth Doctor.

Since 1999, he has continued acting in the role of the Seventh Doctor in a series of audio plays for Big Finish Productions.

In November 2013, McCoy co-starred with Peter Davison and Colin Baker in the comedy short film The Five(ish) Doctors Reboot, which paid homage to Doctor Who's 50th anniversary.

In 2015, McCoy criticised the concept of a female incarnation of the Doctor: "I'm a feminist and recognize there are still glass ceilings in place for many women, but where would we draw the line? A Mr. Marple instead of Miss Marple? A Tarzanette?... I'm sorry, but no — Doctor Who is a male character, just like James Bond... If they changed it to be politically correct then it would ruin the dynamics between the doctor and the assistant, which is a popular part of the show."

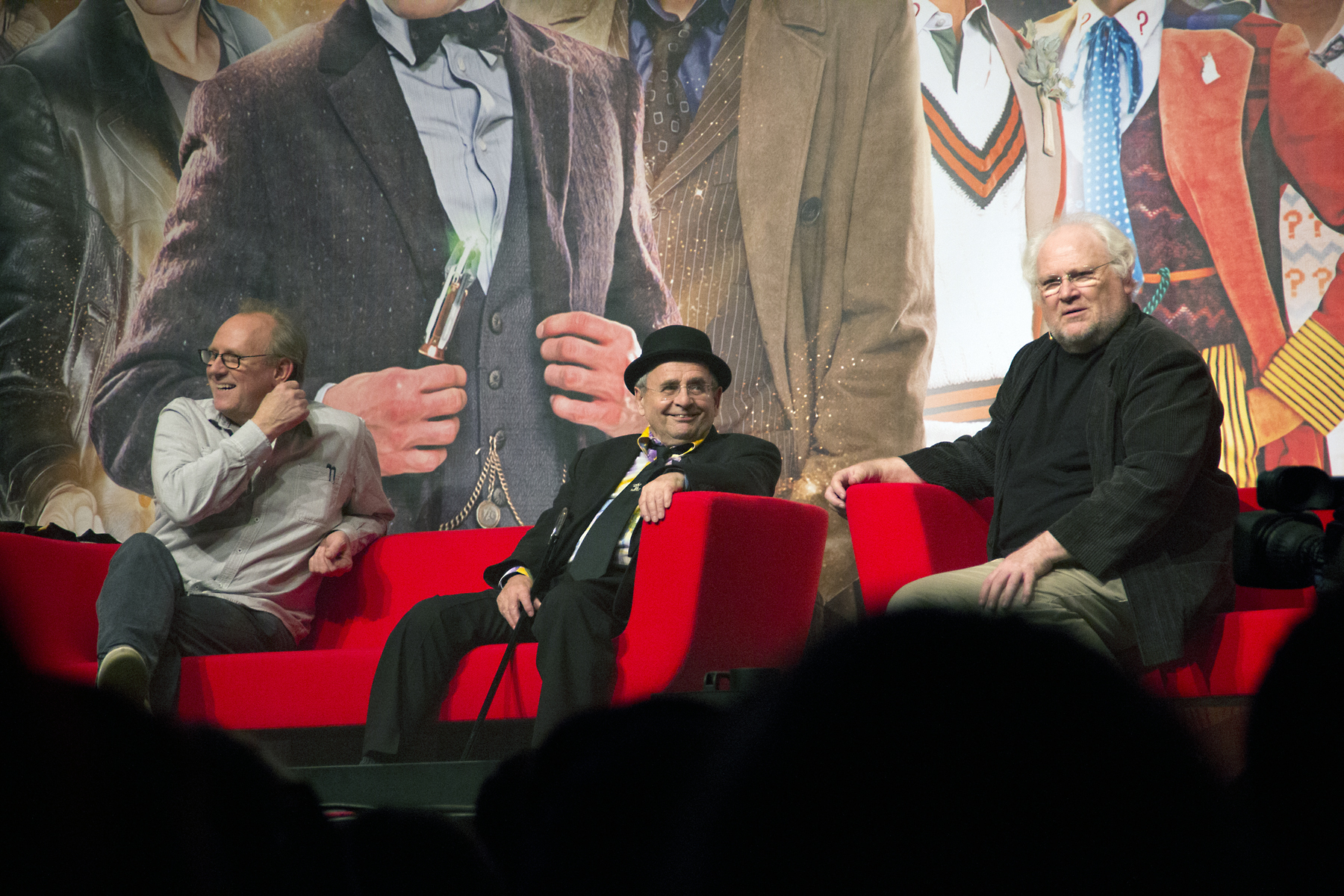
McCoy with Peter Davison and Colin Baker at the Doctor Who 50th Anniversary Celebration Weekend in 2013

In January 2021, McCoy returned to the role of the Doctor, alongside Bonnie Langford as Mel Bush, in "A Business Proposal for Mel!" This short acted as an announcement trailer for the Blu ray The Collection release of season 24. McCoy returned to the show in the 2022 special "The Power of the Doctor" as a Guardian of the Edge—a manifestation of the Thirteenth Doctor’s subconscious who takes on the Seventh Doctor's form. To mark Doctor Who's 60th anniversary, he reprised his role as the Seventh Doctor in Tales of the TARDIS (2023), reuniting with Sophie Aldred as Ace. In a 2024 interview, McCoy stated that Russell T Davies had reintroduced past Doctors in Tales of the TARDIS as they "may be coming back" in future stories.

McCoy reprised his role of the Doctor in a brief cameo during the opening ceremony of the 2026 Commonwealth Games in Glasgow. As there is no current series of Doctor Who in production, this made McCoy the most recent actor to portray the Doctor on television.

=== Later work (1990–present) ===
McCoy appeared on the first night of broadcast of Channel 5, playing Michael Sams in the drama film Beyond Fear (1997).

McCoy missed out on a role in Pirates of the Caribbean: The Curse of the Black Pearl and was the second choice to play the role of Bilbo Baggins in Peter Jackson's The Lord of the Rings film trilogy.

McCoy appeared as the lawyer Dowling in a BBC Production of Henry Fielding's novel, The History of Tom Jones, A Foundling.

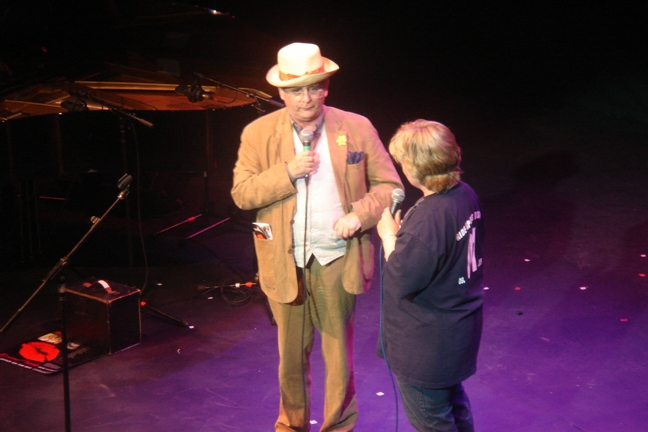
McCoy performing with Sandi Toksvig in The Lovely Russell Concert in June 2008

In 2001 he appeared in Paul Sellar's asylum comedy "The Dead Move Fast" at the Gilded Balloon as part of the Edinburgh Festival Fringe, playing the role of Doctor Mallinson. In 2012 he played the part of the suicidal Mr. Peters in JC Marshall's play, Plume, at the Tron Theatre in Glasgow.

McCoy has appeared with the Royal Shakespeare Company in The Lion, the Witch, and the Wardrobe and in King Lear in 2007, playing the Fool to Ian McKellen's Lear, a performance which made use of McCoy's ability to play the spoons. The RSC production with McKellen and McCoy was staged in Melbourne, during late July/early August 2007 and Wellington and Auckland, New Zealand, during mid to late August 2007. It came into residence at the New London Theatre in late 2007, ending its run in January 2008. He reprised the role for the 2008 television movie of the production.

In May 2008 he performed with the Carl Rosa Opera Company in a production of Gilbert and Sullivan's The Mikado, playing the title role. He only performed with the company briefly, for the week of the show's run performing at the Sheffield Lyceum. Despite being set in Japan, he was able to demonstrate his ability to play the spoons by using his fan. In 2009 McCoy played the character of Mr. Mushnik in the Chocolate Factory's production of Little Shop of Horrors.

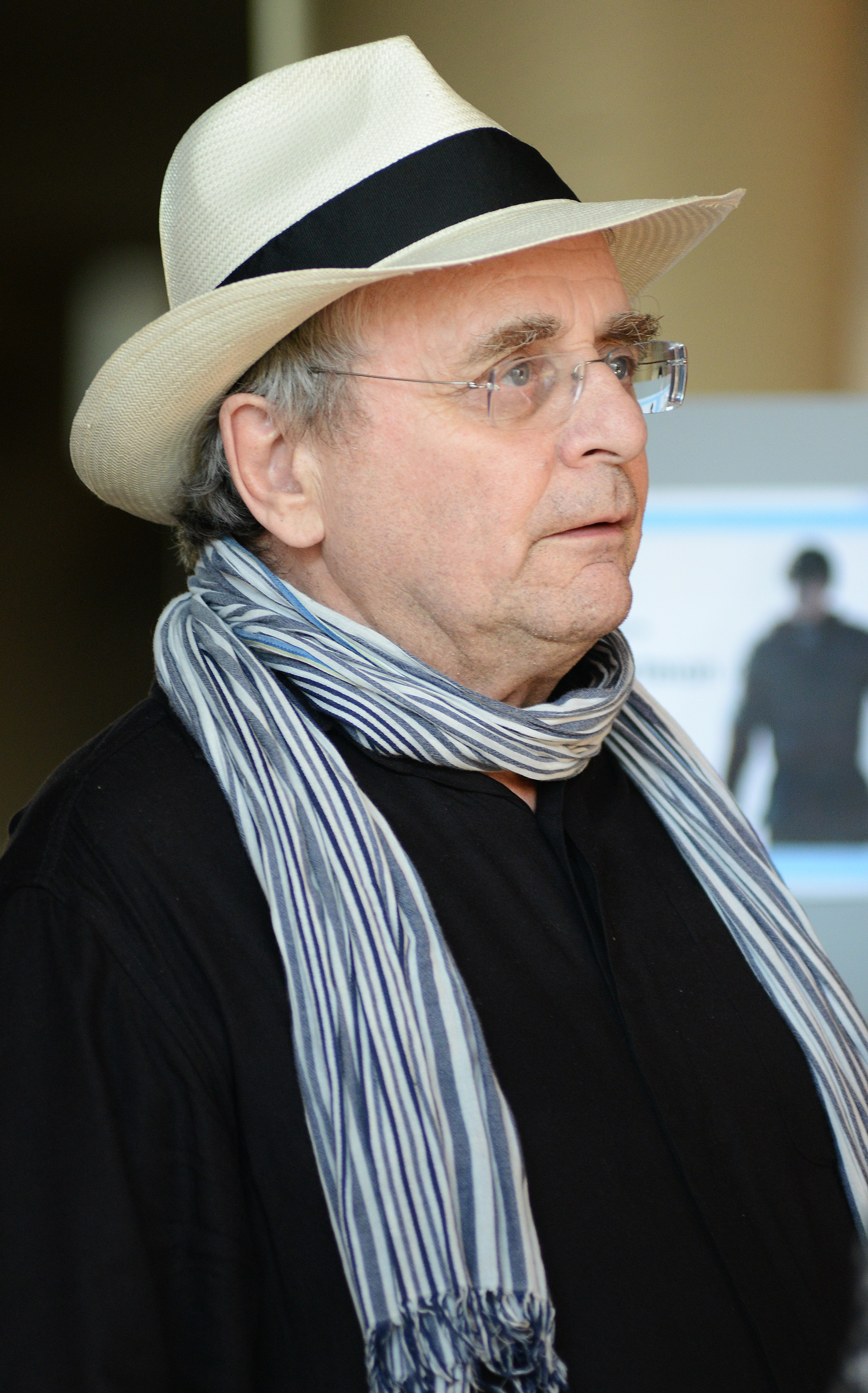
McCoy in 2014

He has also made guest appearances in the television series The Bill, the Rab C. Nesbitt episode "Father" as Rab's mentally ill brother Gash Sr. and the Still Game episode shown on the BBC "Oot" (AKA "Out"), where he played a hermit-type character adjusting to life in modern Glasgow, having remained in his house for over 30 years. Pals Jack, Victor and Winston do their best to help ‘Archie’ played by McCoy. Humor and chaos breaks out in a brilliant comedy show. In October 2008, he had a minor guest role as an injured ventriloquist on Casualty. In the same month McCoy guest starred in an episode of the BBC soap opera Doctors, playing an actor who once played the time-travelling hero of a children's television series called "The Amazing Lollipop Man". The role was written as a tribute to McCoy.

McCoy began filming for The Hobbit, a three-part adaptation of the book, in 2011. He portrays the wizard Radagast, alongside fellow King Lear actor Ian McKellen, who reprises his role as Gandalf. Although the character of Radagast is only alluded to in The Hobbit, and only a minor character in The Lord of the Rings, the part was expanded for the Hobbit films. In January and February 2016, McCoy appeared in the three-part BBC series The Real Marigold Hotel, which followed a group of celebrity senior citizens including Miriam Margolyes and Wayne Sleep on a journey to India.

In 2017 he returned to the stage at the Edinburgh Fringe, in the production A Joke alongside Star Trek: Voyager actor Robert Picardo.

In July 2026 he was revealed to have narrated the independent video game "Forest of Deceit", a 4-8 player social deduction party game.

== Personal life ==
McCoy and his wife, Agnes Verkaik, have two sons, born in 1976 and 1977. They were filmed for the Doctor Who serial The Curse of Fenric playing Haemovores, but their scenes were deleted from the finished release.

McCoy was raised Catholic, but stated in 2010 that he did not believe in God.

McCoy spent some of the COVID-19 lockdowns living in France.

=== Political views ===
In 2021, McCoy criticised the British government response to the COVID-19 pandemic, which he called "incompetent". He also criticised Brexit, stating "we joined the [European Union] as a poor country. Forty years later we stupidly leave it as the second richest country in Europe. And that was because there was a partnership with other people who weren't public-school trained. These guys that are running us, they could run Rome or ancient Greece but they can’t run a modern country."
