= Doctor Who Unbound =

Doctor Who audio drama series

Big Finish Productions audio drama
- Series: Doctor Who
- Featuring: Alternate incarnations of The Doctor
- Executive producers: Jason Haigh-Ellery; Nicholas Briggs
- Release date: May 2003 - present

Doctor Who Unbound is a series of audio plays produced by Big Finish Productions. Free from the constraints of continuity, the Doctor Who Unbound audios present a series of "What if...?" scenarios, and cast new actors in the role of the Doctor.

== Background ==
In Exile, Arabella Weir plays a female incarnation of the Doctor. American alternative weekly Houston Press's Jef Rouner described her portrayal as "one of the most melancholy of all the Doctors." Other actors who played the Doctor included Geoffrey Bayldon, David Collings, Derek Jacobi, and David Warner.

Sympathy for the Devil features UNIT during the transfer of sovereignty over Hong Kong in 1997. David Warner played an alternate Third Doctor in the story, which also saw Nicholas Courtney play an alternate version of The Brigadier and Mark Gatiss play an alternate version of The Master. Warner and Courtney reprised their roles for the eighth story in the range, Masters of War. In 2016, Warner and Gatiss reprised their roles as the Doctor and the Master respectively for The New Adventures of Bernice Summerfield audio drama series: The Unbound Universe and its sequel Ruler of the Universe in 2017. After being pulled from the Unbound universe into the regular continuity of the Doctor Who universe, both characters have made ongoing appearances in various Big Finish ranges.

In February 2022, after a 14-year hiatus, Big Finish Productions announced the return of Unbound. Two boxsets, comprising 3 stories each, feature Colin Baker as an alternate warrior Doctor known as "The Doctor of War" in a universe where the Fourth Doctor made the ultimate decision on Skaro, destroying the Daleks, and showing how events may have unfolded after that fateful decision was made. These boxsets were announced to be released in April and September 2022 respectively.

On 28 September 2022, Big Finish re-released the original first 8 stories in a download boxset titled Doctor Who: Unbound: 1-8 Collected.

From 2017 to 2021, David Bradley reprised the role of the First Doctor in Big Finish's The First Doctor Adventures range, having played the character in the 2017 Christmas special "Twice Upon A Time" and 2022 Centenary special "The Power of the Doctor" as well as 2013 docudrama "An Adventure in Space and Time" in which he portrayed original First Doctor actor William Hartnell. Bradley co-starred with Jemma Powell, Jamie Glover and Claudia Grant who had played actors Jacqueline Hill, William Russell and Carole Ann Ford in the docudrama as well as playing the actors' original parts of Barbara Wright, Ian Chesterton and Susan Foreman. On 11 February 2022, it was announced that Stephen Noonan would instead take over the role of the First Doctor with a portrayal closer to the character's original depiction. In April 2022, Executive Producer Nicholas Briggs expressed interest in producing further stories with Bradley. In Issue 167 of Big Finish's magazine Vortex, Briggs teased further stories featuring Bradley's portrayal, saying "We've some very exciting plans afoot for further stories with David Bradley — something quite out of the ordinary and rather delightful." On 17 April, it was announced Bradley would continue to play a new alternate version of the First Doctor alongside Powell, Glover and Grant as alternate versions of their respective characters, but now as part of the Unbound range instead, in a series titled The First Doctor Unbound. Producer David O’Mahony stated that the series would take "stylistic inspiration" from “The Peter Cushing feature films".

== Cast and characters ==
List indicator

This section includes characters who will appear or have appeared in at least one season.

- A green cell indicates the actor is a main cast member.
- A red cell indicates the actor is a recurring cast member.
- A light blue cell indicates the actor is a guest or special guest cast member.

Actor	Character	Appearances										
Actor	Character	Original series								Doctor of War		The First Doctor Unbound
Actor	Character	1	2	3	4	5	6	7	8	Gen.	Des.	The First Doctor Unbound
Geoffrey Bayldon	Alternate First Doctor	✓						✓				
David Bradley	Alternate First Doctor											✓
David Warner	Alternate Third Doctor		✓						✓			
David Collings	Alternate Doctor			✓								
Ian Brooker	Alternate Doctor			✓								
Michael Jayston	The Valeyard				✓							
Derek Jacobi	Martin Bannister					✓						
Arabella Weir	Alternate Third Doctor						✓					
Colin Baker	The Doctor of War									✓	✓	
Tom Baker	The Fourth Doctor									✓		
Nicholas Briggs	The Doctor						✓					
Nicholas Briggs	The Daleks								✓	✓	✓	TBA
Carole Ann Ford	Susan Foreman	✓						✓				
Claudia Grant	Susan Foreman											✓
Nicholas Courtney	The Brigadier		✓						✓			
Mark Gatiss	The Master		✓									
Geoffrey Beevers	The Master									✓	✓	
Nicola Bryant	Peri Brown									✓		
Christopher Naylor	Harry Sullivan									✓	✓	
Sadie Miller	Sarah Jane Smith									✓	✓	
Terry Molloy	Davros								✓		✓	
Louise Jameson	Leela										✓	
Jemma Powell	Barbara Wright											✓
Jamie Glover	Ian Chesterton											✓

== Episodes ==
=== Original series (2003–2008) ===
No.	Title	Directed by	Written by	Featuring	Released
1	"Auld Mortality"	Nicholas Briggs	Marc Platt	Alternative First Doctor (Geoffrey Bayldon), Susan Foreman	May 2003
"What if... the Doctor and Susan had never left Gallifrey?"
2	"Sympathy for the Devil"	Gary Russell	Jonathan Clements	Alternative Third Doctor (David Warner), The Brigadier, The Master	June 2003
"What if... the Doctor had not been UNIT's scientific advisor?"
3	"Full Fathom Five"	Jason Haigh-Ellery	David Bishop	Alternative Doctor (David Collings), Ruth, Alternative New Doctor (Ian Brooker, uncredited)	July 2003
"What if... the Doctor believed that the ends justified the means?"
4	"He Jests at Scars..."	Gary Russell	Gary Russell	The Valeyard, Mel	August 2003
"What if... the Valeyard had won" at the end of The Trial of a Time Lord?"
5	"Deadline"	Nicholas Briggs	Robert Shearman	Martin Bannister (Derek Jacobi), Philip, Barbara, Amy/Susan	September 2003
"What if... Doctor Who did not materialise as a television series?"
6	"Exile"	Nicholas Briggs	Nicholas Briggs	The Previous Doctor (Nicholas Briggs), Alternative Third Doctor (Arabella Weir)	September 2003
"What if... the Doctor had escaped the justice of the Time Lords" at the end of The War Games?"
7	"A Storm of Angels"	John Ainsworth	Marc Platt	Alternative First Doctor (Geoffrey Bayldon), Susan Foreman	January 2005
"What if... the Doctor really had changed history, even just the tiniest bit?"
8	"Masters of War"	Jason Haigh-Ellery	Eddie Robson	Alternative Third Doctor (David Warner), The Brigadier, Davros, Daleks, Thals	December 2008
"What if.... the Doctor and the Brigadier travelled in the TARDIS together?"

The 'Alternative Third Doctor' (played by David Warner) from Sympathy for the Devil and Masters of War returned in The New Adventures of Bernice Summerfield, and subsequently appeared in Once and Future: Time Lord Immemorial and Dark Gallifrey: The War Master. The Master from Sympathy for the Devil (as played by Mark Gatiss) returned in The New Adventures of Bernice Summerfield and later in The War Master: Anti-Genesis.

=== Doctor of War (2022) ===
No.	Title	Directed by	Written by	Featuring	Released
Genesis
1	"Dust Devil"	Barnaby Kay	John Dorney	The Doctor of War (Colin Baker), Fourth Doctor, Sarah Jane Smith, Harry Sullivan, Peri Brown, Narvin	April 2022
2	"Aftershocks"	Barnaby Kay	Lou Morgan	The Doctor of War, The Master, Narvin	April 2022
3	"The Difference Office"	Barnaby Kay	James Kettle	The Doctor of War, Romana, Daleks, Kraals	April 2022
Destiny
1	"Who Am I?"	Barnaby Kay	Nigel Fairs	The Doctor of War, The Master	September 2022
2	"Time Killers"	Barnaby Kay	Lizzie Hopley	The Doctor of War, The Master	September 2022
3	"The Key to Key to Time"	Barnaby Kay	Tim Foley	The Doctor of War, The White Guardian	September 2022

=== The First Doctor Unbound (2025–present) ===
No.	Title	Directed by	Written by	Featuring	Released
1	"Knights of the Round TARDIS"	David O’Mahony	LR Hay	First Doctor, Susan, Ian, Barbara	September 2025
2	"Return to Marinus"	David O’Mahony	Jonathan Morris	First Doctor, Susan, Ian, Barbara, Daleks	January 2026
3	TBA	David O’Mahony	N/A	First Doctor, Susan, Ian, Barbara	May 2027

== Reception ==
Den of Geek's Andrew Blair selected Doctor Who Unbound as one of the ten Doctor Who stories that would make great musicals. The Mary Sue's Alan Kistler said "fans enjoyed imagining these alternate Doctors" of David Warner and Arabella Weir. American alternative weekly newspaper Houston Press's Jef Rouner said the series "fielded a fantastic set of stories."

== Fandom ==
In 2016, BBC America's Anglophenia featured a fan-made version of the Doctor Who theme music for Unbound's alternate Second Doctor.
