= Terror of the Vervoids =

143c – The Trial of a Time Lord: Terror of the Vervoids
- Doctor Who serial

Cast
- Doctor: Colin Baker – Sixth Doctor
- Companion: Bonnie Langford – Mel Bush
- Others: Lynda Bellingham – The Inquisitor; Michael Jayston – The Valeyard; Honor Blackman – Professor Sarah Lasky; Malcolm Tierney – Doland; David Allister – Bruchner; Michael Craig – Commodore Travers; Denys Hawthorne – Rudge; Yolande Palfrey – Janet; Arthur Hewlett – Kimber; Sam Howard – Atza; Tony Scoggo – Grenville/Enzu; Leon Davis – Ortezo; Simon Slater – Edwardes; Barbara Ward – Mutant/Ruth Baxter; Peppi Borza – First Vervoid; Bob Appleby – Second Vervoid; Mike Mungarvan – Duty Officer; Hugh Beverton – Guard/First Guard; Martin Weedon – Second Guard

Production
- Directed by: Chris Clough
- Written by: Pip and Jane Baker
- Script editor: John Nathan-Turner (uncredited)
- Produced by: John Nathan-Turner
- Music by: Malcolm Clarke
- Production code: 7C
- Series: Season 23
- Running time: 4 episodes, 25 minutes each
- First broadcast: 1 November 1986
- Last broadcast: 22 November 1986

Chronology
← Preceded by The Trial of a Time Lord: Mindwarp	Followed by → The Trial of a Time Lord: The Ultimate Foe

Terror of the Vervoids is the third serial of the larger narrative known as The Trial of a Time Lord which encompasses the whole of the 23rd season of the British science fiction television series Doctor Who. It was first broadcast in four weekly parts on BBC1 from 1 to 22 November 1986. The title Terror of the Vervoids is never used on screen and was first used in relation to these episodes for the 1987 novelisation, with the four episodes that comprise the season being referred to as The Trial of a Time Lord Parts Nine to Twelve. This serial is the first appearance of Bonnie Langford as the companion Mel Bush.

In the serial, the alien time traveller the Sixth Doctor (Colin Baker) is put on trial by his people, the Time Lords, and is accused of meddling in the affairs of other worlds. Much of the story consists of video testimony presented by the Doctor, his own defence, of his own future where the last of a race of plants called Vervoids on board a spaceliner in 2986 plot to wipe out all animal life on board for their own survival.

== Plot ==
At the courtroom, the Doctor takes to the stand in his defence and uses the Matrix to show the Time Lords his tale of events of how he saved everyone on board the freighter, Hyperion III.

On board the Hyperion III, Communication Officer Edwardes is incapacitated by an unseen person, who then sends a distress call to a nearby ship: the TARDIS. The Doctor and his new companion, Mel Bush, follow the message to the freighter, where they meet a trio of scientists: Professor Lasky and her colleagues Bruchner and Doland. The group is guarding a shipment of Demeter seeds and some large flower pods. Mel is investigating the guarded plant area when Edwardes finds her. While opening the door for Mel, Edwardes is electrocuted.

While investigating, The Doctor and Mel find a half-human, half-plant hybrid strapped to a table. The creature implores them to stop Lasky, but Lasky, Bruchner and Doland sedate her. Doland tells the time travellers that the creature is his assistant, Ruth Baxter. During their experiments involving cross-fertilisation, pollen penetrated a scratch in Ruth's thumb, causing the resulting plant maturing process to partially transform her human body. They are taking her to Earth in the hope that they can reverse the infection.

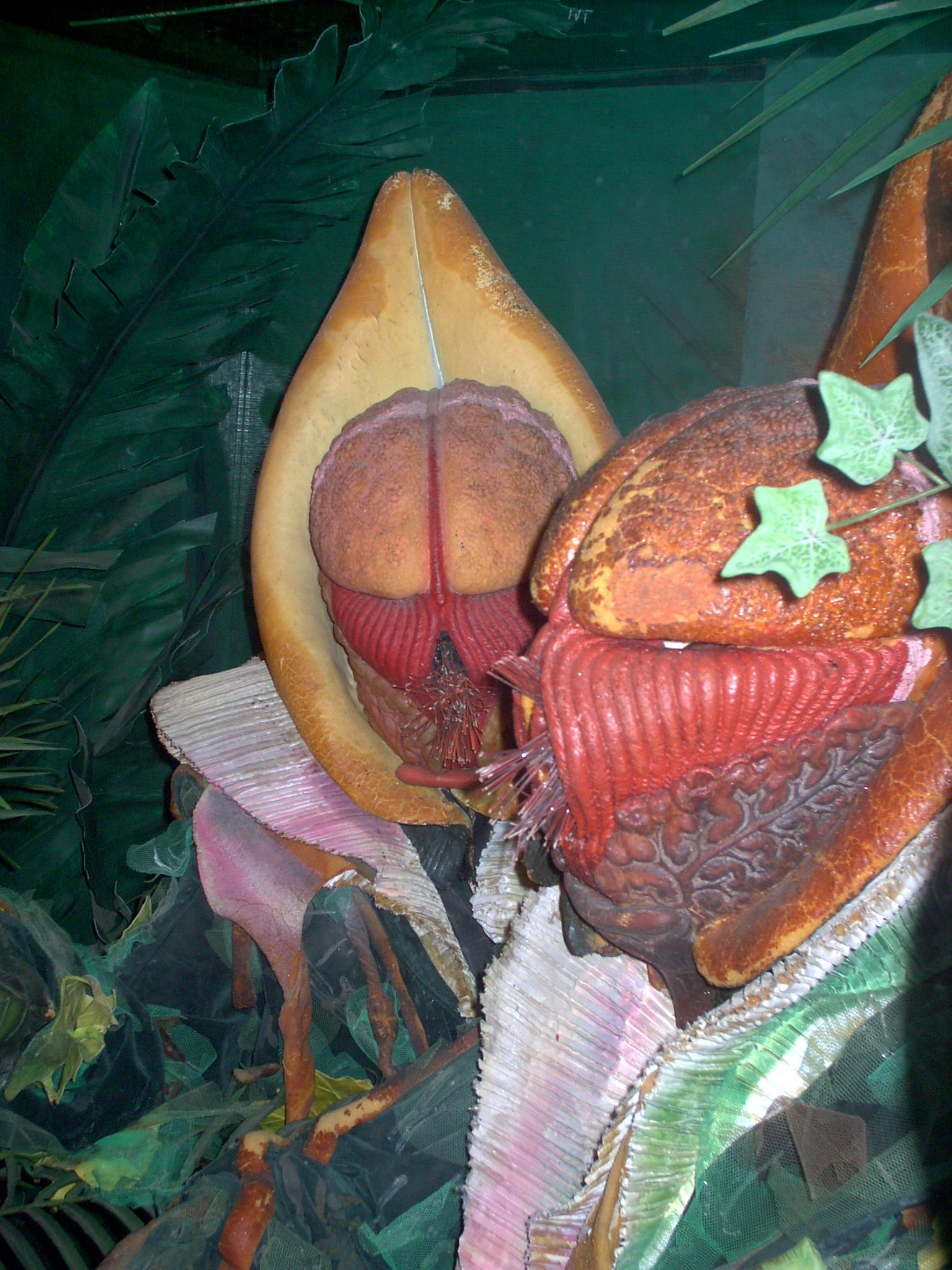
Vervoids, on display at a Doctor Who exhibition

It is revealed that human-kind is being killed by plant-like creatures called Vervoids, the creatures that came out of the pods when Edwardes was electrocuted.

Bruchner goes to the bridge and forces Travers and the pilot to leave, then changes the course of the Hyperion to head into the black hole of Tartarus, planning to destroy the ship, and kill the Vervoids. The Doctor, Lasky and Travers attempt to break into the bridge, but the Vervoids have filled it with marsh gas. Bruchner is killed by the gas, but the ship is still heading into the black hole. Security Officer Rudge summons two Mogarian crew members, as they can breathe in the poisonous atmosphere. They direct the ship away from the black hole, but when it is safe, Rudge and the Mogarians hijack the ship. Rudge tells the Doctor that the Mogarians are trying to regain the supply of metals stored in the vault. Rudge is taking the hijacking as a means of securing a "more comfortable retirement."

The Doctor, Mel, Travers and Lasky meet to discuss the Vervoids. The Doctor reveals that the Vervoids hate 'animal-kind' and kill for survival. Lasky vows to help destroy the creatures.

The Doctor has an idea that vionesium, the rare metal taken from Mogar stored in the ship's vault, would accelerate the Vervoids' life-cycle towards its natural end. Travers lowers the lighting and heating in the ship, forcing the Vervoids back to their lair, where the Doctor and Mel are waiting. They deploy the metal against the Vervoids, which causes the creatures' leaf-covered bodies to die. Having saved the survivors, the Doctor and Mel depart in the TARDIS.

Back in the courtroom, upon viewing these events in the Matrix, the Valeyard considers the Doctor's destruction of the Vervoids as genocide, and pleads for the Time Lords to seek the death penalty against the Doctor.

== Production ==
Episode	Title	Run time	Original release date	UK viewers (millions)
1	"Part Nine"	24:56	1 November 1986	5.2
2	"Part Ten"	24:18	8 November 1986	4.6
3	"Part Eleven"	24:07	15 November 1986	5.3
4	"Part Twelve"	24:45	22 November 1986	5.2

=== Cast notes ===
Honor Blackman later played Anahita in the Fifth Doctor audio drama The Children of Seth.

Arthur Hewlett previously appeared in the Fourth Doctor story State of Decay.

== Commercial releases ==
=== In print ===
Terror of the Vervoids
- Author: Pip and Jane Baker
- Cover artist: Tony Masero
- Series: Doctor Who book: Target novelisations
- Release number: 125
- Publisher: Target Books
- Publication date: 17 September 1987 (Hardback) 18 February 1988 (Paperback)
- ISBN: 0-426-20313-5

A novelisation of this serial, written by Pip and Jane Baker, was published by Target Books in September 1987.

=== Home media ===
Terror of the Vervoids was released on VHS as part of the three-tape The Trial of a Time Lord set in October 1993. It was released on DVD in September 2008, again boxed with the other three stories of Season 23, and was released individually as part of the Doctor Who DVD Files in Issue 131 on 8 January 2014. Season 23 was released on Blu-ray on 23 September 2019; the release contained the broadcast version of the story, an extended cut of all four episodes and a "standalone edition".
