= The Ultimate Evil =

1989 Doctor Who novel by Wally K. Daly

- Author: Wally K. Daly
- Series: Doctor Who book: Doctor Who Missing Episodes
- Release number: 2
- Subject: Featuring: Sixth Doctor; Peri
- Set in: Period between Revelation of the Daleks and The Mysterious Planet
- Publisher: Target Books
- Publication date: August 1989
- ISBN: 0-426-20338-0
- Preceded by: The Nightmare Fair; The Chase
- Followed by: Mission to Magnus; Mission to the Unknown

The Ultimate Evil is the second in a series of novelisations, based on a number of cancelled scripts from the 1986 season of the television series Doctor Who. It was written by Wally K. Daly. It was first published by Target Books in 1989 as the second volume of its Missing Episodes series.

== Synopsis ==
The Sixth Doctor's TARDIS is working perfectly, leaving him with nothing to do. When Peri suggests a holiday, the Doctor decides to visit the peaceful country of Tranquela. But an evil arms dealer, the Dwarf Mordant has been busy fomenting hatred there, so they will break a truce with their enemy, the people of the continent of Ameliora. But when even the Doctor becomes affected, can anything stop Mordant's plans?

== Background ==
It was announced in 1985 that Michael Grade, controller of BBC1, had cancelled a number of long-running programmes in order to help fund the launch of a new soap opera named EastEnders. Of the many programmes that were cancelled, Doctor Who was the most high-profile. A campaign was quickly launched by the national press to see about its return and Grade very quickly confirmed that Doctor Who would be returning in 1986.

Several stories had already been in the planning stages for Season 23 of Doctor Who, three of which were in the middle of being scripted when the announcement was made. The Ultimate Evil was to be directed by Fiona Cumming.

In 1988, Target Books, which had been successfully publishing novelisations of Doctor Who stories for many years, saw itself quickly running out of available televised material (although a number of serials remained unadapted, most of these were off-limits due to licensing problems). While negotiations went forward with the BBC for the publication of all new adventures, the decision was made to resurrect three of the cancelled scripts and publish them in book form. The writers of all three were approached, and all were signed on to write the novels.

== Intended Transmission ==
The Ultimate Evil Part One was to be transmitted on 18 January 1986. Part Two was to have been broadcast on 25 January 1986.

== Audio adaptation ==
In 2009 Daly was approached by Big Finish Productions to write an audio adaptation for their Lost Stories range. However, they were unable to come to a suitable agreement. Daly had already recorded an audiobook for a fund-raising exercise between the RNIB and Rotary International. Big Finish eventually did come to terms with Daly and his audio adaptation was released in November 2019.
