= Mindwarp =

143b – The Trial of a Time Lord: Mindwarp
- Doctor Who serial

Cast
- Doctor: Colin Baker – Sixth Doctor
- Companion: Nicola Bryant – Peri Brown
- Others: Michael Jayston – The Valeyard; Lynda Bellingham – The Inquisitor; Brian Blessed – King Yrcanos; Nabil Shaban – Sil; Christopher Ryan – Kiv; Patrick Ryecart – Crozier; Alibe Parsons – Matrona Kani; Trevor Laird – Frax; Thomas Branch – The Lukoser; Gordon Warnecke – Tuza; Richard Henry – Mentor

Production
- Directed by: Ron Jones
- Written by: Philip Martin
- Script editor: Eric Saward
- Produced by: John Nathan-Turner
- Music by: Richard Hartley
- Production code: 7B
- Series: Season 23
- Running time: 4 episodes, 25 minutes each
- First broadcast: 4 October 1986
- Last broadcast: 25 October 1986

Chronology
← Preceded by The Trial of a Time Lord: The Mysterious Planet	Followed by → The Trial of a Time Lord: Terror of the Vervoids

Mindwarp is the second serial of the larger narrative known as The Trial of a Time Lord which encompasses the whole of the 23rd season of the British science fiction television series Doctor Who. It was first broadcast in four weekly parts on BBC1 from 4 to 25 October 1986. The title Mindwarp is not used on screen and appears only on the serial's scripts with the four episodes that comprise the story being transmitted as The Trial of a Time Lord Parts Five to Eight. This story marks the final appearance of Nicola Bryant as Peri Brown.

In the serial, the alien time traveller the Sixth Doctor (Colin Baker) is put on trial by his people, the Time Lords, and is accused of meddling in the affairs of the planet Thoros Beta in the 24th century. Much of the story consists of a video testimony presented by the prosecutor – the Valeyard (Michael Jayston) – of The Doctor discovering the alien arms dealer Sil (Nabil Shaban) is looking for a way to prolong the life of Lord Kiv (Christopher Ryan) by transplanting Kiv's mind into another.

== Plot ==
The serial is presented as video evidence of a trial prosecuted by the Time Lord, the Valeyard, of the Sixth Doctor's interference into the affairs of other species.

As shown by the video, on Thoros Beta, Crozier, a scientist employed by the Doctor's old enemy, arms dealer Sil, (Note: Sil previously appeared in the 1985 serial Vengeance on Varos.) is attempting to perfect the ability to transplant the mind of Kiv, Sil's superior, into another body to overcome Kiv's impending death. The Doctor and Peri are captured while investigating the planet, and the Doctor is tortured using a mind-altering device, before he and Peri are broken out by King Yrcanos, one of Crozier's test subjects.

With his mind apparently affected by the device, and the Doctor at the trial having minimal memory of events past this point, the Doctor suddenly betrays Peri and Yrcanos, who flee into the tunnels, and claims that he wants to work with Sil and the Mentors. Peri and Yrcanos, together with rebels from the neighbouring planet Thoros Alpha are captured. With Kiv's condition quickly deteriorating, the Doctor helps Crozier transplant Kiv's brain into the body of a deceased fisherman as a temporary solution, but complications in the procedure cause Crozier to realise the brain will not survive being transplanted again. Crozier instead suggests using his machine to transfer Kiv's consciousness into Peri's body directly. The Doctor frees Yrcanos and the rebels, and they destroy the device controlling the enslaved people from Thoros Alpha, throwing the complex into chaos right as Kiv's condition starts to deteriorate again.

While searching for Peri, the Doctor is drawn into his TARDIS and forcibly taken to the Doctor's trial by the Time Lords, (Note: As depicted in the 1986 serial The Mysterious Planet) which the Valeyard insists was to prevent the Doctor from further impacting the development of the universe. Kiv's mind is successfully transplanted into Peri, destroying her personality. Yrcanos, his entry into the lab delayed by the Time Lords until after Kiv awakens in Peri's body, is distraught at the results of the operation, and fires wildly, killing Peri. (Note: The Doctor insists throughout this serial the video evidence has been falsified, and in the later 1986 serial The Ultimate Foe, the Master confirms that the Valeyard did this. The Inquisitor also confirms in The Ultimate Foe that Peri was not killed.)

At the trial, the Inquisitor insists that the interference of the Time Lords was to prevent Crozier from further impacting the course of the universe's evolution. The Valeyard says Peri's death was because the Doctor’s negligence made it "impossible for her to live". The Doctor insists that the present trial appears to be serving an ulterior motive, and resolves to determine what it is as the trial continues.

== Production ==
Episode	Title	Run time	Original release date	UK viewers (millions)
1	"Part Five"	24:42	4 October 1986	4.8
2	"Part Six"	24:45	11 October 1986	4.6
3	"Part Seven"	24:33	18 October 1986	5.1
4	"Part Eight"	24:44	25 October 1986	5.0

=== Music ===
Initially it was intended that the BBC Radiophonic Workshop would provide music scores for both this and the following segment of The Trial of a Time Lord; both were assigned to Malcolm Clarke to begin with, although Terror of the Vervoids was reassigned to Elizabeth Parker shortly afterwards. However, fellow Radiophonic Workshop composer Jonathan Gibbs left early in 1986 and was not replaced until the following year, leaving the other composers backlogged and with no one free to do the incidental music for Mindwarp. It was suggested that Dick Mills could provide both the music and sound effects, but John Nathan-Turner rejected this idea and instead hired film composer Richard Hartley to create the incidental music for this segment. It would be the only time that Hartley worked on the series. The original recordings of Hartley's score no longer exist in the BBC archives with the result that there was no isolated score included on the DVD release of this story. For the Blu-ray release of Season 23, Richard Hartley, along with Mark Ayres re-recorded the entire score in order to present the serial in a new 5.1 mix.

=== Cast notes ===
Deep Roy, who had previously played Mr. Sin in The Talons of Weng-Chiang, has an uncredited role as the Posicarian delegate. Trevor Laird returned to Doctor Who in the Tenth Doctor era as Clive Jones, father of the Doctor's companion Martha Jones. Christopher Ryan returned in 2008 as Sontaran leader General Staal in "The Sontaran Stratagem" and "The Poison Sky", and in 2010 as another Sontaran, Commander Strak, in "The Pandorica Opens".

== Commercial releases ==
=== In print ===
Mindwarp
- Author: Philip Martin
- Cover artist: Alister Pearson
- Series: Doctor Who book: Target novelisations
- Release number: 139
- Publisher: Target Books
- Publication date: 15 June 1989
- ISBN: 0-426-20335-6

A novelisation of this serial, written by Philip Martin, was published by Target Books in June 1989 and was the final segment of the Trial arc to be adapted. Martin's novelisation adds a joke ending that gives away the revelation regarding Peri's fate in The Ultimate Foe, suggesting an entirely different outcome for the character and for Yrcanos than is suggested in the serial.

=== Home media ===
In October 1993, this story was released on VHS as part of the three-tape The Trial of a Time Lord set. The Region 2 DVD was released on 29 September 2008, similarly boxed with the other three stories of this season. This serial was scheduled to be released as part of the Doctor Who DVD Files in Issue 130 on 25 December 2013.

The Collection – Season 23 was released on Blu-ray on 7 October 2019. Extended versions of Mindwarp (along with extended versions of the remaining 10 episodes) were included as extras on Discs 5 and 6.
