= Doctor Who: The Sixth Doctor Adventures =

Audio play series based on the Doctor Who television series

The Sixth Doctor Adventures

Big Finish Productions audio drama
- Series: Doctor Who
- Featuring: Sixth Doctor
- Executive producers: Jason Haigh-Ellery; Nicholas Briggs
- Release date: January 2002 (retroactively); August 2020 (actual)

The Sixth Doctor Adventures is a Big Finish Productions audio play series based on the television series Doctor Who. It sees the return of Colin Baker reprising his role as the Sixth Doctor.

== History ==
In 1999, beginning with the story The Sirens of Time, Big Finish Productions began producing a series of audio adventures featuring the Fifth Doctor, Sixth Doctor and Seventh Doctor. For 22 years these stories continued collectively known as Big Finish's Main Range. In May 2020, Big Finish announced the main range would conclude in March 2021 and subsequently replaced with regular releases of each Doctor's adventures continuing in their own respective ranges. Several previously released special titles were retroactively reallocated into these new ranges by Big Finish.

== Cast and characters ==
List indicator

This section includes characters who will appear or have appeared in at least one season.

- A green cell indicates the actor is a main cast member.
- A red cell indicates the actor is a recurring cast member.
- A light blue cell indicates the actor is a guest or special guest cast member.

Actor	Character	Appearances													
Actor	Character	Sp.	TLA	6D&P	TE	WW	Undr.	Unl.	Unb.	TQD	TToaTL	TC&MC	BT	Exp.	Reun.
Colin Baker	The Doctor	✓	✓	✓	✓	✓	✓	✓	✓	✓	✓	✓	✓	✓	✓
Nicola Bryant	Peri Brown	✓		✓						✓	✓		✓	✓	✓
India Fisher	Charley Pollard	✓	✓												
Michael Jayston	The Valeyard	✓	✓												
Lisa Greenwood	Flip Jackson		✓							✓					
Miranda Raison	Constance Clarke		✓		✓					✓		✓			
Bonnie Langford	Melanie Bush		✓			✓	✓	✓	✓	✓	✓				
Mark Bonnar	The Eleven				✓										
Lucy Gaskell	Miskavel				✓										
Ruth Madeley	Hebe Harrison					✓	✓	✓	✓						
Cherylee Houston	Elise					✓	✓		✓						
Imogen Stubbs	Patricia McBride / Purity						✓	✓	✓						
Toby Hadoke	Ron						✓	✓	✓						
Mark Strickson	Vislor Turlough													✓	✓

=== Notable Guests ===
- Toby Longworth as Beep the Meep and Josiah W. Dogbolter
- Robert Jezek as Frobisher
- Maggie Stables as Evelyn Smythe
- Yee Jee Tso as Doctor Reece Goddard
- Stewart Lee as Ryan Carey
- Richard Herring as Taylor Renchard
- Nicholas Briggs as the Cybermen and the Krotons
- Philip Madoc as Rag Cobden
- Lynda Bellingham as The Inquisitor
- Chris Finney as Keith Potter
- Trevor Baxter as Professor George Litefoot
- Christopher Benjamin as Henry Gordon Jago
- Sylvester McCoy as The Doctor
- Rove McManus as Jonah Strong
- Martin O'Neill as Arthur Lee
- David Banks as Cyber Leader
- Terry Molloy as Davros
- Katy Manning as Iris Wildthyme
- Gareth David-Lloyd as Sir Kenneth Rushworth

== Episodes ==
=== Specials ===
No.	Title	Directed by	Written by	Featuring	Released
1	"The Ratings War"	Gary Russell	Steve Lyons	Sixth Doctor, Beep the Meep	January 2002
2	"The Maltese Penguin"	Gary Russell	Robert Shearman	Sixth Doctor, Frobisher	June 2002
3	"Real Time"	Gary Russell	Gary Russell	Sixth Doctor, Evelyn Smythe, Cybermen	December 2002
4	"Her Final Flight"	Gary Russell	Julian Shortman	Sixth Doctor, Peri	December 2004
5	"Cryptobiosis"	Gary Russell	Elliot Thorpe	Sixth Doctor, Peri	December 2006
6	"Return of the Krotons"	Nicholas Briggs	Nicholas Briggs	Sixth Doctor, Charley Pollard, Krotons	December 2008
7	"Trial of the Valeyard"	Barnaby Edwards	Alan Barnes and Mike Maddox	Sixth Doctor, The Inquisitor, the Valeyard	December 2013

=== The Sixth Doctor: The Last Adventure (2015) ===
The Sixth Doctor: The Last Adventure is a British audio drama based on the series. Within the narrative of the series, the Doctor, its principal character, is a time-travelling alien known as a Time Lord, whose biological characteristics allow him to regenerate into a new form to circumvent an otherwise deadly experience; the device has been used to allow for a change in lead actor every few years in the production of the televised series. The sixth such instance was depicted in 1987 at the very beginning of Time and the Rani, but due to the firing between seasons of Sixth Doctor actor Colin Baker, the episode gave the event very little screen time and didn't explain what had caused it.

Big Finish Productions producer David Richardson approached Baker in 2014, after seeing "The Time of the Doctor", which had depicted (on television) the regeneration of the Eleventh Doctor into the Twelfth: "I felt very strongly that regeneration stories, and each Doctor’s final end, are very important to Doctor Who fans – these are stories that allow us to see the Doctor at his most courageous, making a sacrifice that only makes us love him more." Baker, who had been working with Big Finish since 1999, agreed to participate, saying that his depiction of the Doctor "did not benefit from" the difficult circumstances the show faced in the 1980s, and that the quality of Big Finish's work was "the only reason [he had] agreed to bring [his] Doctor to an end."

The audio drama consists of four one-hour episodes, each by a different author and each pairing the Doctor with a different companion and taking place at a different point in his life, but all unified by the presence of the villainous Valeyard, a potential future version of the Doctor introduced in Baker's last television serial, The Trial of a Time Lord. Besides Baker, Michael Jayston and Bonnie Langford reprised their roles from The Trial of a Time Lord, respectively as the Valeyard and as the Doctor's companion Mel.

The final part (The Brink of Death) explains that the Sixth Doctor dies due to the radiation of the planet Lakertya as part of his sacrifice in order to stop the Valeyard from taking over existence.

No.	Title	Directed by	Written by	Featuring	Released
1	"The End of the Line"	Nicholas Briggs	Simon Barnard and Paul Morris	Sixth Doctor, Constance Clarke, the Master, the Valeyard	August 2015
2	"The Red House"	Nicholas Briggs	Alan Barnes	Sixth Doctor, Charley Pollard, the Valeyard	August 2015
3	"Stage Fright"	Nicholas Briggs	Matt Fitton	Sixth Doctor, Flip, Jago & Litefoot, the Valeyard	August 2015
4	"The Brink of Death"	Nicholas Briggs	Nicholas Briggs	Sixth Doctor, Mel Bush, the Valeyard, Seventh Doctor	August 2015

=== The Sixth Doctor and Peri (2020) ===
No.	Title	Directed by	Written by	Featuring	Released
1	"The Headless Ones"	Scott Handcock	James Parsons and Andrew Stirling-Brown	Sixth Doctor, Peri Brown	August 2020
2	"Like"	Scott Handcock	Jacqueline Rayner	Sixth Doctor, Peri Brown	August 2020
3	"The Vanity Trap"	Scott Handcock	Stuart Manning	Sixth Doctor, Peri Brown	August 2020
4	"Conflict Theory"	Scott Handcock	Nev Fountain	Sixth Doctor, Peri Brown	August 2020

=== The Eleven (2021) ===
No.	Title	Directed by	Written by	Featuring	Released
1	"One for All"	Ken Bentley	Lizzie Hopley	Sixth Doctor, Constance, the Eleven	September 2021
2	"The Murder of Oliver Akkron"	Ken Bentley	Nigel Fairs	Sixth Doctor, Constance, the Eleven	September 2021
3	"Elevation"	Ken Bentley	Chris Chapman	Sixth Doctor, Constance, the Eleven	September 2021

=== Water Worlds (2022) ===
No.	Title	Directed by	Written by	Featuring	Released
1	"The Rotting Deep"	Helen Goldwyn	Jacqueline Rayner	Sixth Doctor, Melanie Bush, Hebe Harrison	May 2022
2	"The Tides of the Moon"	Helen Goldwyn	Joshua Pruett	Sixth Doctor, Melanie Bush, Hebe Harrison	May 2022
3	"Maelstrom"	Helen Goldwyn	Jonathan Morris	Sixth Doctor, Melanie Bush, Hebe Harrison	May 2022
–	"Interlude: The Dream Nexus"	Read by: Toby Hadoke	Adam Christopher	Sixth Doctor, Melanie Bush, Hebe Harrison	May 2022

=== Purity Undreamed (2022) ===
No.	Title	Directed by	Written by	Featuring	Released
1	"The Mindless Ones"	Helen Goldwyn	Paul Magrs	Sixth Doctor, Mel, Hebe, Elise, Ron, Patricia	August 2022
2	"Reverse Engineering"	Helen Goldwyn	Jonathan Morris	Sixth Doctor, Mel, Hebe, Patricia	August 2022
3	"Chronomancer"	Helen Goldwyn	Robert Valentine	Sixth Doctor, Mel, Hebe, Elise, Ron, Patricia / Purity	August 2022

=== Purity Unleashed (2023) ===
No.	Title	Directed by	Written by	Featuring	Released
1	"Broadway Belongs to Me!"	Helen Goldwyn	Matthew Sweet	Sixth Doctor, Mel	May 2023
2	"Purification"	Helen Goldwyn	Chris Chapman	Sixth Doctor, Mel, Purity	May 2023
3	"Time-Burst"	Helen Goldwyn	Ian Potter	Sixth Doctor, Mel, Purity, Hebe, Ron	May 2023
–	"Interlude: The Doctor and His Amazing Technicolour Nightmare Coat"	Read by: Rosie Baker	Gary Russell	Sixth Doctor, Mel	May 2023

=== Purity Unbound (2023) ===
No.	Title	Directed by	Written by	Featuring	Released
1	"Girl in a Bubble"	Helen Goldwyn	Jacqueline Rayner	Sixth Doctor, Mel, Hebe, Purity	August 2023
2	"The Corruptions"	Helen Goldwyn	Mark Wright	Sixth Doctor, Mel, Hebe, Purity	August 2023
3	"The Wrong Side of History"	Helen Goldwyn	Robert Valentine	Sixth Doctor, Mel, Hebe, Purity	August 2023

=== The Quin Dilemma (2024) ===
On 30 June 2023, two boxsets were scheduled for 2024. The first is scheduled for March 2024. Big Finish's Senior Producer John Ainsworth teased that it would follow "the Sixth Doctor celebrates his 40th anniversary by encountering some old acquaintances".

No.	Title	Directed by	Written by	Featuring	Released
1	"The Exaltation"	Samuel Clemens	Jacqueline Rayner	Sixth Doctor, Mel	March 2024
2	"Escape from Holy Island"	Samuel Clemens	Chris Chapman	Sixth Doctor, Peri, HG Wells	March 2024
3	"Sibling Rivalry"	Samuel Clemens	Robert Valentine	Sixth Doctor, Constance, Flip, Sontarans	March 2024
4	"Children of the Revolution"	Samuel Clemens	Robert Valentine	Sixth Doctor, Constance, Flip, Sontarans	March 2024
5	"The Thousand Year Thaw"	Samuel Clemens	Chris Chapman	Sixth Doctor, Peri	March 2024
6	"The Firstborn"	Samuel Clemens	Jacqueline Rayner	Sixth Doctor	March 2024
–	"Interlude: The Ultimate Poe"	Read by: David Monteath	Andrew Collins	Sixth Doctor, Mel, Edgar Allan Poe	April 2024

=== The Trials of a Time Lord (2024) ===
No.	Title	Directed by	Written by	Featuring	Released
1	"Part One"	Jonathan S Powell	Rochana Patel	Sixth Doctor, Peri, Mel, Cyber Leader, Davros	August 2024
2	"Part Two"	Jonathan S Powell	Rochana Patel	Sixth Doctor, Peri, Mel, Cyber Leader, Davros	August 2024
3	"Part Three"	Jonathan S Powell	Katharine Armitage	Sixth Doctor, Peri, Mel, Cyber Leader, Davros	August 2024
4	"Part Four"	Jonathan S Powell	Katharine Armitage	Sixth Doctor, Peri, Mel, Cyber Leader, Davros	August 2024
5	"Part Five"	Jonathan S Powell	Stewart Pringle	Sixth Doctor, Peri, Mel, Cyber Leader, Davros	August 2024
6	"Part Six"	Jonathan S Powell	Stewart Pringle	Sixth Doctor, Peri, Mel, Cyber Leader, Davros	August 2024

=== The Cosmos and Mrs Clarke (2025) ===
On 23 May 2024, Big Finish announced their slate of boxsets for 2025. Senior Producer John Ainsworth said “The Sixth, Seventh and Eighth Doctors will feature in two box sets each, as in previous years. I shan't give too much away but expect companions old and new, some classic series monsters that haven't featured on audio for a decade, and a name that's been hiding in plain sight (and it's time to go there...).” The first boxset is scheduled for May 2025.

No.	Title	Directed by	Written by	Featuring	Released
1	"The Story Demon"	Samuel Clemens	Julian Richards	Sixth Doctor, Constance Clarke, Iris Wildthyme, Daleks	May 2025
2	"The Key to Many Worlds"	Samuel Clemens	Paul Magrs	Sixth Doctor, Constance Clarke, Iris Wildthyme, Daleks	May 2025
3	"Inconstancy"	Samuel Clemens	Ian Potter	Sixth Doctor, Constance Clarke, Iris Wildthyme, Daleks	May 2025

=== Bad Terms (2025) ===
No.	Title	Directed by	Written by	Featuring	Released
1	"Saiorse of the Seven Seas"	Samuel Clemens	Nina Millns	Sixth Doctor, Peri Brown	August 2025
2	"Red for Danger!"	Samuel Clemens	Nev Fountain	Sixth Doctor, Peri Brown	August 2025

=== Expulsion (2026) ===
No.	Title	Directed by	Written by	Featuring	Released
1	"The Reckoning"	Samuel Clemens	Nev Fountain	Sixth Doctor, Peri, Vislor Turlough	April 2026
2	"A Crucible of Queens"	Samuel Clemens	Lizbeth Myles	Sixth Doctor, Peri, Vislor Turlough	April 2026
3	"The Curse of the Duergar"	Scott Handcock	Julian Richards	Sixth Doctor, Peri, Vislor Turlough	April 2026

=== Reunion (2026) ===
No.	Title	Directed by	Written by	Featuring	Released
1	"Save the Date"	Samuel Clemens	Matthew Sweet	Sixth Doctor, Peri, Turlough	August 2026
2	"Poison's Reach"	Samuel Clemens	Paul Sutton	Sixth Doctor, Peri, Turlough	August 2026
3	"Broken Home"	Samuel Clemens	AK Benedict and Guy Adams	Sixth Doctor, Peri, Turlough	August 2026
