= Doctor Who season 23 =

1986 season of British sci-fi TV series

Doctor Who
- Season 23
- Cover art of the Blu-ray release for the complete season
- Starring: Colin Baker; Nicola Bryant; Bonnie Langford; Lynda Bellingham; Michael Jayston
- No. of stories: 1
- No. of episodes: 14

Release
- Original network: BBC1
- Original release: 6 September – 6 December 1986

Season chronology
- ← Previous; Season 22 Next → Season 24

The twenty-third season of British science fiction television series Doctor Who, known collectively as The Trial of a Time Lord, aired in weekly episodes from 6 September to 6 December 1986. It contained four adventures: The Mysterious Planet, Mindwarp, Terror of the Vervoids and The Ultimate Foe; the season also marked the final regular appearance of Colin Baker as the Sixth Doctor.

The idea for the serial stemmed from several production changes to Doctor Who, such as reduced screen time for the season and an instruction from BBC1 controller Michael Grade that the series needed to contain less violence and more humour. Several problems occurred during production, including the death of scriptwriter Robert Holmes and the resignation of script editor Eric Saward. When it ended, Baker was dismissed from the role, according to some sources on the orders of Grade, although he has denied this. John Nathan-Turner produced the series.

== Synopsis ==
In the serial, the Sixth Doctor is tried by the High Council of Time Lords for breaking several of the laws of Gallifrey, the Time Lords' home world, including interference with outside worlds and genocide. A mysterious character called the Valeyard acts as prosecutor. In the first two chapters (The Mysterious Planet and Mindwarp) events from the Doctor's past and present are submitted as evidence of his guilt. The third chapter (Terror of the Vervoids) presents future events in the Doctor's defence. In the concluding chapter (The Ultimate Foe) the Doctor's trial is halted, and the Doctor confronts the Valeyard and his old rival, the Master, in order to clear his name and to save the High Council.

== Casting ==
=== Main cast ===
- Colin Baker as the Sixth Doctor
- Nicola Bryant as Peri Brown
- Bonnie Langford as Melanie Bush

Colin Baker makes his final appearance as the Doctor in this longest-running serial before being dismissed from the role by the BBC. Nicola Bryant departs as Peri Brown in Mindwarp. Bonnie Langford makes her debut as the Doctor's future companion Melanie Bush in Terror of the Vervoids.

=== Recurring stars ===
- Michael Jayston as the Valeyard
- Lynda Bellingham as the Inquisitor
- Anthony Ainley as The Master
- Tony Selby as Sabalom Glitz

Michael Jayston and Lynda Bellingham both appeared throughout the whole serial. Tony Selby appeared in The Mysterious Planet and The Ultimate Foe, while Anthony Ainley returned as the Master in The Ultimate Foe.

== Serials ==
The series remained at once-weekly Saturday broadcasts. All episodes were 25 minutes long, with the exception of Part 14, which ran for just under 30 minutes. This running time was the result of a plea by John Nathan-Turner to his superiors at the BBC that the serial's final episode needed the additional three minutes to conclude the story properly. Although there were now 14 episodes in the season, the total running time was overall reduced since the episodes were just over half as long.

No. story	No. in season	Serial title	Episode titles	Directed by	Written by	Original release date	Prod. code	UK viewers (millions)	AI
143a	1	The Mysterious Planet	"Part One"	Nicholas Mallett	Robert Holmes	6 September 1986	7A	4.9	72
143a	1	The Mysterious Planet	"Part Two"	Nicholas Mallett	Robert Holmes	13 September 1986	7A	4.9	69
143a	1	The Mysterious Planet	"Part Three"	Nicholas Mallett	Robert Holmes	20 September 1986	7A	3.9	70
143a	1	The Mysterious Planet	"Part Four"	Nicholas Mallett	Robert Holmes	27 September 1986	7A	3.7	72
The Doctor's TARDIS is plucked out of time and space. The Sixth Doctor is charged with breaking the First Law of Time by the High Council of Gallifrey, a law forbidding interference in alien worlds and galactic affairs. The Valeyard presents the transgressions on a video screen, depicting the Doctor’s past adventures with his companion Peri Brown. The Doctor becomes suspicious about evidence being censored. In the first flashback, the Doctor and Peri arrive on the tribal planet Ravalox, located two million light years from Earth's known location. The Doctor notes a similarity between Ravalox and Earth, with objects from Earth—notably Marble Arch tube station and the novel Moby Dick—present on Ravalox. The only apparent astronomical difference between the two is Ravalox's position in the galaxy. Sabalom Glitz attempts to obtain secrets and technology that are guarded by a robot. The Doctor is forced to deactivate the robot’s unstable power supply to avoid a chain reaction, but in the process, the secrets are destroyed. As he leaves Ravalox, the Doctor wonders why Earth appears to have been moved several million light-years from its original position.
143b	2	Mindwarp	"Part Five"	Ron Jones	Philip Martin	4 October 1986	7B	4.8	71
143b	2	Mindwarp	"Part Six"	Ron Jones	Philip Martin	11 October 1986	7B	4.6	69
143b	2	Mindwarp	"Part Seven"	Ron Jones	Philip Martin	18 October 1986	7B	5.1	66
143b	2	Mindwarp	"Part Eight"	Ron Jones	Philip Martin	25 October 1986	7B	5.0	72
The Valeyard presents his second piece of evidence for the prosecution, the Doctor and Peri's activities on Thoros Beta, immediately before the trial. The flashback shows the Doctor investigating arms sales, where he sees his old adversary Sil. Sil's race, the Mentors, are revealed to have been supplying Yrcanos, the local king of a Viking-like primitive culture, with advanced weaponry. Meanwhile, a scientist, Crozier, is preparing for surgery on Kiv, an influential Mentor whose brain is expanding. The Doctor is portrayed as self-serving and unconcerned with Peri's welfare during the flashback, as he appears to help Crozier and the Mentors by abandoning and betraying Peri and Yrcanos. This uncharacteristic behaviour convinces the Doctor that the evidence has been altered. When the Doctor learns that Peri has been chosen as the new host for Kiv's brain, he allies with Yrcanos to kill the Mentors. However, before he can attack he is captured by the High Council, resulting in Peri's 'death'.
143c	3	Terror of the Vervoids	"Part Nine"	Chris Clough	Pip and Jane Baker	1 November 1986	7C	5.2	66
143c	3	Terror of the Vervoids	"Part Ten"	Chris Clough	Pip and Jane Baker	8 November 1986	7C	4.6	69
143c	3	Terror of the Vervoids	"Part Eleven"	Chris Clough	Pip and Jane Baker	15 November 1986	7C	5.3	69
143c	3	Terror of the Vervoids	"Part Twelve"	Chris Clough	Pip and Jane Baker	22 November 1986	7C	5.2	69
The Doctor is now allowed to present evidence for his defence. He chooses events from the future, in hopes that it will prove he has reformed after the Thoros-Beta incident. During the presentation, some details appear altered from what the Doctor reviewed, furthering his suspicions that evidence is being tampered with. In the year 2986, the Doctor and his new companion Mel answer a distress call from the interstellar ship Hyperion III. The ship is sabotaged and people are dying at the hands of the Vervoids, plant-like humanoids who the Doctor learns were genetically engineered to be slaves. Although the Doctor and Mel are able to stop the Vervoids, he admits that none of the Vervoids survived the voyage. The Valeyard—under Article 7 of Gallifreyan law—charges the Doctor with genocide.
143d	4	The Ultimate Foe	"Part Thirteen"	Chris Clough	Robert Holmes	29 November 1986	7C	4.4	69
143d	4	The Ultimate Foe	"Part Fourteen"	Chris Clough	Pip and Jane Baker	6 December 1986	7C	5.6	69
The Doctor claims that the Matrix has been deliberately altered, and the Keeper of the Matrix is summoned. Seconds later, the Master appears on the Matrix's screen. Sabalom Glitz and Mel are then called as witnesses to the Doctor's defence. The secrets Glitz sought had been stolen from the Time Lords, and Earth was ravaged and moved to preserve them. The Doctor was used as a scapegoat, and the Valeyard—an amalgam of the Doctor's evil personalities from between his twelfth and final incarnation—was offered the Doctor's remaining regenerations. To ensure a guilty verdict, the Valeyard distorted the evidence. The Doctor's attempts to prevent the Valeyard from killing the High Council are stopped by the Master, who wants to dispose of the Doctor. The Doctor defeats the Valeyard by destroying the Matrix archive. The Inquisitor clears the Doctor of all charges and offers him the presidency, which he declines, claiming she should stand instead. The Inquisitor informs The Doctor that Peri is not dead, but alive and well and has become the Warrior Queen Consort of King Yrcanos. After the Doctor and Mel leave, she asks the Keeper of the Matrix to make repairs to the Matrix, who reveals his face to be the Valeyard.

== Preproduction ==
=== Original Season 23 ===
The change of format that Doctor Who had undergone in Season 22 (45-minute episodes, moving back to one episode per week on Saturday evenings) had been reasonably successful, with ratings around the 6–8 million mark. As such, the production team began preparations for Season 23 in the same format, with a total of 13 episodes spread over six stories, with five 2-episode serials and one of three episodes. A number of storylines were submitted, with six eventually being commissioned between September 1984 and February 1985. However, in the latter month, the BBC announced that, as a cost-cutting measure owing to the costs of several large projects (not least of which was the launch of EastEnders), Season 23 was being put back from its planned transmission in January 1986 to the following September, which would be a different financial year.

==== Planned serials ====
Story number	No of Episodes	Title	Written by
1	2	The Nightmare Fair	Graham Williams
Written by former producer Graham Williams, this two-part story was commissioned on 25 September 1984 as Arcade and was planned to open the original 23rd series. Nathan-Turner hoped to have Matthew Robinson direct the adventure. When the hiatus was announced, Nathan-Turner asked Williams to continue with the story, but as four 25-minute episodes. After the complete cancellation of the original season, Williams wrote a novelisation of the script which was published by Target Books in May 1989. It was later adapted by John Ainsworth for Big Finish Productions as part of their The Lost Stories series in November 2009.
2	2	The Ultimate Evil	Wally K. Daly
Written by Wally K. Daly, this two-part story was planned to be the second story in the original 23rd series. Nathan-Turner hoped to have Fiona Cumming direct the adventure. Daly novelised the script which was published by Target Books in August 1989. An audiobook of this novelisation, read by Daly himself, was released by the RNIB in March 2010. It was later adapted by Daly for Big Finish as part of their The Lost Stories series, released in November 2019.
3	2	Mission to Magnus	Philip Martin
Written by Philip Martin, this two-part story was planned to be the third story in the original 23rd series. Nathan-Turner hoped to have Ron Jones direct the adventure. Martin wrote a novelisation of the script which was published by Target Books in July 1990. It was later adapted by Martin for Big Finish as part of their The Lost Stories series in December 2009.
4	3	Yellow Fever and How to Cure It	Robert Holmes
Yellow Fever and How to Cure It was a three-part story by Robert Holmes that would have taken place in Singapore and featured the Autons as the monsters, with either the Rani or the Master appearing. The first episode was commissioned on 26 October 1984, before being put on hold. The entire story was subsequently commissioned on 6 February 1985, only a couple of weeks before news of the planned hiatus broke. Nathan-Turner hoped to have Graeme Harper direct the adventure. After the news of the hiatus, Holmes was asked by the production team to continue with the story but as six 25-minute episodes, this version seeing the removal of the Master from the plot. Holmes reportedly only completed a story outline before the planned Series 23 was completely cancelled.
5	2	In the Hollows of Time	Christopher H. Bidmead
Commissioned as a two-part story from ex-script editor Christopher H. Bidmead on 21 November 1984. After the news of the hiatus, Bidmead was asked by the production team to continue with the story but as four 25-minute episodes. It was later adapted as The Hollows of Time by Bidmead for Big Finish as part of their The Lost Stories series in June 2010.
6	2	The Children of January	Michael Feeney Callan
Written by Michael Feeney Callan, this story was commissioned on 5 February 1985. After the news of the hiatus, Callan was asked by the production team to continue with the story but as four 25-minute episodes. It had been planned that an adaptation of this story would appear as part of Big Finish's The Lost Stories range, but fell through due to the author's commitments and was replaced by The Macros.

A number of other scrapped proposals for serials also existed. Phillip Martin proposed three, including Doomwraiths, in which an alien race which genetically engineered humanity returns to find their experiment has "failed", Space Sargasso, in which the TARDIS is brought to a spaceship graveyard by the Master, and Valley of Shadows, in which the Doctor travels to the Egyptian underworld to save Peri. A story from Pip and Jane Baker, titled Gallifrey, was commissioned following the hiatus announcement, and would have seen the destruction of the Doctor's home planet Gallifrey. Other scrapped concepts included Point of Entry by Barbara Clegg, which would have featured Christopher Marlowe and an alien race called the Omnim, and Meltdown by Gary Hopkins, which would have seen the Doctor reunite with his former traveling companion Victoria Waterfield, who is now crusading against nuclear waste. Stories by David Banks and Peter Grimwade, titled Flipback and League of the Tancreds, were also scrapped.

=== Revised Season 23 ===
Title card as used in this season

Although Doctor Who had been recommissioned, it yet again underwent a format change, with episodes reduced in length back to 25 minutes, and the full season running to only 14 episodes (a total of 350 minutes' running time), which worked out at almost half the total of Season 22. As a consequence, the production team were forced to abandon the various serials that had been commissioned for the original Season 23, and instead come up with something new. John Nathan-Turner and Eric Saward eventually came up with the idea of having the various serials linked with an overarching narrative—this led to the conception of a trial story with A Christmas Carol-inspired "past, present, and future" storyline, thereby stretching the length of the season. The planned 14-part serial was intended to be divided into a pair of 4-part stories followed by a 6-part one. By July 1985, the characters of the Valeyard, the Inquisitor and Mel were conceived.

== Production ==
Robert Holmes was commissioned to write the first and final chapters of the serial. His draft of the first chapter, The Mysterious Planet, was criticised by BBC Head of Series and Serials, Jonathan Powell, for its comedic content, contradicting the BBC controller's request for a more humorous series – which took away confidence from Holmes.

The second chapter, Mindwarp, was written by Philip Martin. The main villain of the serial was Sil, introduced in Vengeance on Varos (1985). Sil was selected due to his popularity among the production team who asked Martin to feature the character in the ultimately-cancelled story Mission to Magnus. Nathan-Turner asked Martin to include Sil in his chapter, and asked confidentially for Peri to be killed in accordance with Bryant's wishes to leave the show with a bang.

The third chapter was originally to be interlinked with the fourth. Holmes was originally asked to write it, but declined, citing a dislike of six-part serials. After rejecting submissions by Christopher H. Bidmead and PJ Hammond, Nathan-Turner approached husband-and-wife writing team Pip and Jane Baker to write a studio-based serial, Terror of the Vervoids.

Holmes was unable to finish writing the fourth chapter, originally called Time Inc., before his death from a liver illness and Hepatitis B on 24 May 1986, aged 59. The Bakers were commissioned by Nathan-Turner, at short notice, to write a new version of the episode, after script editor Eric Saward withdrew his permission for his original version of Part 14 to be used: the original ending would have featured a fight to the death in a time vent, between the Doctor and the Valeyard, as part of a cliff-hanger ending to the season, which horrified Nathan-Turner, as he feared that to use such a downbeat ending would have provided an excuse for the BBC management to cancel the series altogether. Subsequently, the title was later changed to The Ultimate Foe.

A number of stories were considered for the Trial of a Time Lord narrative but scrapped. One was Attack From the Mind by David Halliwell, with the plot planned to deal with a conflict between the ugly-looking Freds and the beautiful Penelopeans. Multiple drafts were produced, but Halliwell received a letter from Saward on 18 October 1985 telling him that Attack from the Mind had been cancelled. Other proposals that were scrapped were The Second Coming by Jack Trevor Story, which would have had links with Attack from the Mind, Pinacotheca by Christopher H. Bidmead, and Paradise Five by Peter J. Hammond.

Filming of the serial began on 8 April 1986 and ended on 14 August that year. For the opening sequence, Nathan-Turner commissioned a 45-second model shot that cost over £8,000, which at that time was the highest amount of money spent on a single special-effects sequence in the history of the series. The outdoor sequences in The Mysterious Planet were filmed on 8 to 11 April in Queen Elizabeth Country Park, and studio work followed on 24 April and 12 May, with a remount being required on 13 June. Studio work for Mindwarp took place from 27 to 29 May and 11–13 June, and location shots were filmed in Brighton from 15 to 16 June. Terror of the Vervoids and The Ultimate Foe were produced simultaneously; production began with location filming for the latter in late June, before returning to the studio to film scenes for both chapters on 16–17 July. Terror of the Vervoids was the last chapter to be completed, with studio work taking place from 30 July–1 August and from 12 to 14 August.

== Reception and analysis ==
Public reaction to The Trial of a Time Lord was mixed. Although the Audience Appreciation figures had improved since the previous season — the lowest figure was 66% for Parts Seven and Nine and the highest was 72% for Parts One, Four and Eight.— the viewing figures were lower.

=== Reviews ===
The Trial of a Time Lord received mixed reviews from Doctor Who critics. Paul Cornell, Martin Day and Keith Topping, co-authors of The Discontinuity Guide, wrote that as a whole, the serial's plot "hangs together remarkably well". David J. Howe and Stephen James Walker, authors of Doctor Who: The Television Companion, disagreed, arguing that the serial was a "monumental wasted opportunity". They disapproved of the trial storyline, being unconvinced that a prosecutor "in any reasonable legal system" would be allowed to modify charges and court proceedings mid-trial. However, they did find the meta-humour of "the Doctor effectively sitting down to watch Doctor Who for fourteen weeks" amusing if repetitive, and praised Baker's acting. Both reviews found that the trial scenes detracted from the chapter story arcs.

Reviews of the individual chapters were also mixed. Although appreciative of the acting of Brian Blessed in Mindwarp, Cornell, Day and Topping argued that the script lacked focus, "[trying] to be comic, grotesque, straight, and farcical all at the same time". Howe and Walker were more favourable towards the script, citing the re-appearance of Sil as positive, and hailing Peri's off-screen death as "one of the most dramatic and impressive moments of the entire season" and Bryant's best scene since The Caves of Androzani. Both reviews judged Terror of the Vervoids to be a well-written story, although Cornell, Day and Topping criticised the dialogue, and Howe and Walker were unimpressed by Bonnie Langford in her performance as Melanie Bush.

== Broadcast ==
The Trial of a Time Lord was broadcast from 6 September to 6 December 1986, and returned to the 25–minute episode format. Episode 14 was slightly longer.

== Home media ==
=== VHS releases ===
Season	Story no.	Serial name	Duration	Release date		
Season	Story no.	Serial name	Duration	UK	Australia	USA / Canada
23	143	The Trial of a Time Lord	14 × 25 min.	October 1993; 3 × VHS	October 1993; 3 × VHS	October 1993; 3 × VHS

=== DVD and Blu-ray releases ===
All releases are for DVD unless otherwise indicated:

- ^{(B)} indicates a Blu-ray release

Season	Story no.	Serial name	Duration	Release date		
Season	Story no.	Serial name	Duration	R2	R4	R1
23	143	The Trial of a Time Lord: The Mysterious Planet; Mindwarp; Terror of the Vervoids; The Ultimate Foe	13 × 25 min. (Note: Each serial in this season comprises four episodes, with the exception of The Ultimate Foe, which was made up of two episodes.); 1 × 30 min.	29 September 2008	5 February 2009	7 October 2008
23	143	Complete Season 23 (Note: Released as Doctor Who: The Collection – Season 23 in Region B. Released as Doctor Who – Colin Baker: Complete Season Two in Region A.)	13 × 25 min. (Note: Each serial in this season comprises four episodes, with the exception of The Ultimate Foe, which was made up of two episodes.); 14 × 30 min. 1 × 35 min. 1 × 100 min.	7 October 2019 ^{(B)}	4 December 2019 ^{(B)}	3 December 2019 ^{(B)}

== In print ==
Season	Story no.	Library no. (Note: Number in Target's Doctor Who Library, if applicable)	Novelisation title	Author	Hardcover release date (Note: Published by Target's parent companies (Allen Wingate, W. H. Allen, BBC Books) unless otherwise indicated)	Paperback release date (Note: Published by Target Books (or by BBC Books under the Target Collection umbrella) unless otherwise indicated)	Audiobook	
Season	Story no.	Library no.	Novelisation title	Author	Hardcover release date	Paperback release date	Release date (Note: Unabridged from BBC Audio / AudioGo unless otherwise indicated)	Narrator
23	143	127 (Note: Mistakenly numbered as number 126 on the title page)	The Mysterious Planet	Terrance Dicks	19 November 1987	21 April 1988	2 September 2013	Lynda Bellingham
23	143	139	Mindwarp	Philip Martin	—N/a	15 June 1989	2 September 2013	Colin Baker
23	143	125	Terror of the Vervoids	Pip and Jane Baker	17 September 1987	18 February 1988	3 October 2013	Bonnie Langford
23	143	131	The Ultimate Foe	Pip and Jane Baker	21 April 1988	15 September 1988	3 October 2013	Michael Jayston

Novelisations of the originally planned season 23

Novelisation title	Author	Paperback release date (Note: Published by Target Books (or by BBC Books under the Target Collection umbrella) unless otherwise indicated)	Audiobook	
Novelisation title	Author	Paperback release date	Release date (Note: Unabridged from BBC Audio / AudioGo unless otherwise indicated)	Narrator
The Nightmare Fair	Graham Williams	18 May 1989	1 June 2023	Toby Longworth
The Ultimate Evil	Wally K. Daly	17 August 1989	2 March 2010 (Note: Published by the Royal National Institute of the Blind)	Wally K. Daly
The Ultimate Evil	Wally K. Daly	17 August 1989	3 September 2026	Nicola Bryant
Mission to Magnus	Philip Martin	19 July 1990	6 November 2025	Nicola Bryant

== Notes ==
- ^a Although the following serial Time and the Rani was the Sixth Doctor's final appearance, Baker declined an offer to return either for the entire story (as originally offered) or solely for a regeneration scene, and the part was instead portrayed by Sylvester McCoy wearing a blond wig.
