= The Hollows of Time =

Doctor Who novel written by Christopher Bidmead

Big Finish Productions audio drama
- Series: Doctor Who: The Lost Stories
- Release no.: 4
- Featuring: Sixth Doctor; Peri Brown
- Written by: Christopher H. Bidmead
- Directed by: John Ainsworth
- Produced by: John Nathan-Turner
- Executive producer(s): Nicholas Briggs; Jason Haigh-Ellery
- Production code: 6Y/AD
- Length: 2 part episodes
- Release date: February 2010
- Preceded by: Mission to Magnus
- Followed by: The Children of January (A Doctor Who story)

The Hollows of Time is a story originally written for the 23rd series of Doctor Who; however, it was cancelled along with the rest of the originally planned scripts for that series due to Doctor Who's 1985 hiatus. Big Finish Productions adapted the story into an audio play in 2010 as part of their Lost Stories series.

== Plot ==
The narrative of the audioplay is framed by the Doctor and Peri aboard the TARDIS, recounting the events of the last few days as the Doctor fears he has lost some of his memories.

Two days prior, the Doctor and Peri arrive in the English countryside via TARDIS and take traditional forms of transportation to reach the village of Hollowdean, where the Doctor plans to meet with an old friend, Foxwell, a former researcher in artificial intelligence for a government laboratory, but now has retired as reverend of the local church. They arrive during a festival, and meet Professor Stream, his assistant Jane, and his chauffeur whom the Doctor nicknames Steel Specs. As they look for Foxwell, Peri encounters the young Simon, who claims to have seen a sand monster, while the Doctor's curiosity is piqued by a glowing object being sold in a white elephant sale. They eventually meet Foxwell, who reminds the Doctor that Stream had been his associate at the lab, and he is now dabbling in a human interface to a computer system as part of a project he is working with Stream, hoping to connect the minds of several people at once to see how they would perform as a computer. With Foxwell's equipment, the Doctor determines that the glowing object is a scale from a Tractator, an alien species that resemble the sand creature Simon saw and which have the ability to control gravity. The Doctor has Peri take Simon to investigate where Simon found the creature, while Jane offers him a ride to collect his TARDIS so that he can study the Tractator scale further.

The Doctor finds Jane is under Steel Specs' control, and that her car is a primitive time machine. Jane manipulates the controls on the Doctor's TARDIS to allow Steel Specs to merge the two time machines and then jettison the Doctor in the car which he sends off to oblivion in deep space while he controls the TARDIS. The Doctor is able to access the time machine's controls to return it to Earth before it disintegrates, arriving back in Stream's mansion just in time. Meanwhile, Peri and Simon fall into a hole near the beach where they were exploring, finding the corpses of several more Tractators. Exploring further, they find the tunnels connected to Stream's mansion, which contains a prison holding more corpses of Tractators. They arrive in the mansion proper just as the Doctor escapes.

They regroup with Foxwell, where the Doctor determines that Steel Specs is manipulating Foxwell to build a quantum gravity engine, a necessary component of a time machine, using Foxwell's neural interface connected to the Tractators to use their gravity-manipulating powers. Steel Specs had used the TARDIS to seize the Great Tractator as the final component of the machine. They race to stop the initiation of the engine, but arrive too late, and the Doctor, Peri, Simon, and Foxwell are trapped in a collapsing bubble of space. They discover Steel Specs is just an android under the full control of Stream, who then kills Jane to prove she was human and will willingly do the same to them. Stream leaves them to die while he prepares to complete the engine test.

The Doctor convinces the Great Tractator to help them, given that they are prisoners as well. The Tractators use their powers to open a time corridor, through which the Doctor and his allies are able to skip through events of the last few days. There they come across evidence that Stream has no credentials and never worked alongside Foxwell, and he has managed to seemingly insert his faked background to everyone's mind, including that of the Doctor. With the use of the time corridor they are able to sabotage the engine test, forcing Stream to leave the TARDIS to check on it. This gives the Tractators time to use their gravity powers on Stream, killing him and putting an end to the test.

Back on the TARDIS, the Doctor continues to worry how Stream had been able to invade his memories and still fears his true memories may have been damaged.

== Cast ==
- Colin Baker as The Doctor
- Nicola Bryant as Peri Brown
- David Garfield as Professor Stream
- Trevor Littledale as Reverend Foxwell
- Susan Sheridan as Mrs Streeter
- Hywel John as Steel Specs
- Victoria Finney as Jane

== Notes ==
- In the Whovian timeline, this story takes place between Leviathan and Paradise 5.

== Continuity ==
- The Tractators appeared in the 1984 Fifth Doctor TV story Frontios, also written by Bidmead. (He also wrote Peter Davison's first story, Castrovalva.)
- The original version of the script would have revealed Professor Stream to be The Master, as played by Anthony Ainley. The rights to the character couldn't be obtained for the Big Finish adaptation and Ainley died in 2004. In this version of the story, the Professor Stream character is retained but his identity is left ambiguous. "Stream" is an anagram of "master", as was the case with several of the Master's other aliases such as Sir Gilles Estram in The King's Demons.
