= Doctor Who: The Lost Stories =

Sci-fi audio series

Doctor Who: The Lost Stories is a sci-fi audio series produced by Big Finish Productions of Doctor Who audio plays adapted from unused TV stories.

== Episodes ==
=== Series 1 (2009–10) ===
The first series is largely adapted from stories planned for the unmade 1985–1986 series. Colin Baker and Nicola Bryant star as the Sixth Doctor and Peri.

Clegg wrote a detailed story breakdown for Point of Entry, which Platt turned into a complete script. Hammond wrote an incomplete script for Paradise 5, which was completed and adapted for audio by Lane. Martin, Bidmead, and Mills have revised their own scripts, with Bidmead describing his revision as a "top-to-bottom rewrite". Paul Finch approached Big Finish with a complete script that his father Brian had written for Season 22 in 1985. The story was completely unknown to Big Finish before this. Michael Feeney Callan's The Children of January was originally part of the line-up, but fell through due to the author's other commitments and was replaced by The Macros.

| No. | Title | Directed by | Written by | Featuring | Released |
|---|---|---|---|---|---|
| 1 | "The Nightmare Fair" | John Ainsworth | Graham Williams | Sixth Doctor, Peri, Celestial Toymaker | November 2009 |
| 2 | "Mission to Magnus" | Lisa Bowerman | Philip Martin | Sixth Doctor, Peri, Ice Warriors, Sil | December 2009 |
| 3 | "Leviathan" | Ken Bentley | Brian Finch and Paul Finch | Sixth Doctor, Peri | January 2010 |
| 4 | "The Hollows of Time" | John Ainsworth | Christopher H. Bidmead | Sixth Doctor, Peri, Tractators | February 2010 |
| 5 | "Paradise 5" | Barnaby Edwards | P.J. Hammond and Andy Lane | Sixth Doctor, Peri, Cherubs, Elohim | March 2010 |
| 6 | "Point of Entry" | John Ainsworth | Barbara Clegg and Marc Platt | Sixth Doctor, Peri, Omnim | April 2010 |
| 7 | "The Song of Megaptera" | John Ainsworth | Pat Mills | Sixth Doctor, Peri | May 2010 |
| 8 | "The Macros" | John Ainsworth | Ingrid Pitt and Tony Rudlin | Sixth Doctor, Peri | June 2010 |

=== Series 2 (2010–11) ===
The first release of the second series is The First Doctor Boxset, a four-disc boxed set including Moris Farhi's stories Farewell Great Macedon and The Fragile Yellow Arc of Fragrance. Farhi's scripts for Farewell Great Macedon have been adapted as an enhanced audiobook, performed by William Russell and Carole Ann Ford, who, respectively, played Ian Chesterton and Susan Foreman.

The second release is The Second Doctor Boxset, another four-disc boxed set including Dick Sharples' The Prison in Space. Sharples' story has been adapted by Simon Guerrier, and is performed by Frazer Hines and Wendy Padbury, who played Jamie McCrimmon and Zoe Heriot. The set also includes The Destroyers, the unmade pilot episode of a proposed Dalek-centred spin-off series for American TV. The episode has been adapted as a full-cast drama, with Nicholas Briggs as the voice of the Daleks.

The remaining releases have been adapted from stories planned for the unmade Season 27, and introduced a new companion for the Seventh Doctor, a young safecracker named Raine Creevy, played by Beth Chalmers. They were released monthly from January–April 2011 are as follows.

The character of Raine makes her debut as an adult in Crime of the Century, but appears as a newborn baby in Thin Ice; Beth Chalmers plays Raine's mother in that story.

| No. | Title | Directed by | Written by | Featuring | Released |
|---|---|---|---|---|---|
| 1 | The First Doctor Boxset "Farewell, Great Macedon" "The Fragile Yellow Arc of Fragrance" | Lisa Bowerman; John Ainsworth | Moris Farhi, adapted by Nigel Robinson | First Doctor, Susan Foreman, Ian Chesterton, Barbara Wright | November 2010 |
| 2 | The Second Doctor Boxset "Prison in Space" "The Destroyers" | Lisa Bowerman | Dick Sharples & Terry Nation, adapted by Simon Guerrier, Nicholas Briggs & John Dorney | Second Doctor, Jamie McCrimmon, Zoe Heriot, Sara Kingdom, Daleks | December 2010 |
| 3 | "Thin Ice" | Ken Bentley | Marc Platt | Seventh Doctor, Ace, Ice Warriors | April 2011 |
| 4 | "Crime of the Century" | Ken Bentley | Andrew Cartmel | Seventh Doctor, Ace, Raine | May 2011 |
| 5 | "Animal" | Ken Bentley | Andrew Cartmel | Seventh Doctor, Ace, Raine, Brigadier Bambera | June 2011 |
| 6 | "Earth Aid" | Ken Bentley | Ben Aaronovitch & Andrew Cartmel | Seventh Doctor, Ace, Raine | July 2011 |

=== Fourth Doctor Lost Stories (2012) ===
| No. | Title | Directed by | Written by | Featuring | Released |
|---|---|---|---|---|---|
| – | The Fourth Doctor Boxset "The Foe from the Future" "The Valley of Death" | Ken Bentley | Robert Banks Stewart, John Dorney, Philip Hinchcliffe and Jonathan Morris | Fourth Doctor, Leela | January 2012 |

=== Series 3 (2011–12) ===
This third batch of stories features three stories with the Fifth Doctor, Nyssa and Tegan Jovanka, followed by three stories with the Sixth Doctor and Peri, followed by dramatic readings of a First Doctor and Second Doctor story to round out the final two releases of the series. This series was released in October 2011 – September 2012.

| No. | Title | Directed by | Written by | Featuring | Released |
|---|---|---|---|---|---|
| 1 | "The Elite" | Ken Bentley | Barbara Clegg and John Dorney | Fifth Doctor, Tegan, Nyssa, Dalek | October 2011 |
| 2 | "Hexagora" | Ken Bentley | Paul Finch, from a story by Peter Ling & Hazel Adair | Fifth Doctor, Tegan, Nyssa | November 2011 |
| 3 | "The Children of Seth" | Ken Bentley | Christopher Bailey and Marc Platt | Fifth Doctor, Tegan, Nyssa | December 2011 |
| 4 | "The Guardians of Prophecy" | Ken Bentley | Johnny Byrne and Jonathan Morris | Sixth Doctor, Peri, Melkurs | May 2012 |
| 5 | "Power Play" | Ken Bentley | Gary Hopkins | Sixth Doctor, Peri, Victoria | June 2012 |
| 6 | "The First Sontarans" | Ken Bentley | Andrew Smith | Sixth Doctor, Peri, Sontarans, Rutans | July 2012 |
| 7 | "The Masters of Luxor" | Lisa Bowerman | Anthony Coburn, adapted by Nigel Robinson | First Doctor, Susan Foreman, Ian Chesterton, Barbara Wright | August 2012 |
| 8 | "The Rosemariners" | Lisa Bowerman | Donald Tosh | Second Doctor, Jamie McCrimmon, Zoe Heriot | September 2012 |

=== Series 4 (2013) ===
A fourth series of stories was released in 2013, featuring one story with the First Doctor, two with the Second Doctor and one with the Third Doctor, featuring the first Third Doctor lost story ever released. The series was released September–December 2013, and the first three stories are connected because they were all originally by Brian Hayles.

| No. | Title | Directed by | Written by | Featuring | Released |
|---|---|---|---|---|---|
| 1 | "The Dark Planet" | Ken Bentley | Brian Hayles, adapted by Matt Fitton | First Doctor, Vicki, Ian Chesterton, Barbara Wright | September 2013 |
| 2 | "The Queen of Time" | Lisa Bowerman | Brian Hayles, adapted by Catherine Harvey | Second Doctor, Jamie McCrimmon, Zoe Heriot, Hecuba | October 2013 |
| 3 | "Lords of the Red Planet" | Lisa Bowerman | Brian Hayles, adapted by John Dorney | Second Doctor, Jamie McCrimmon, Zoe Heriot, Ice Warriors | November 2013 |
| 4 | "The Mega" | Ken Bentley | Bill Strutton, adapted by Simon Guerrier | Third Doctor, Jo Grant, Mike Yates | December 2013 |

=== Series 5 (2019) ===
Two further stories were released in November 2019. The first features the Fifth Doctor, Tegan, and Turlough in an unmade story from Season 21 while the second features the Sixth Doctor and Peri in a fourth story from the unmade 1985–1986 series.

| No. | Title | Directed by | Written by | Featuring | Released |
|---|---|---|---|---|---|
| 1 | "Nightmare Country" | Ken Bentley | Stephen Gallagher | Fifth Doctor, Tegan, Turlough | November 2019 |
| 2 | "The Ultimate Evil" | Helen Goldwyn | Wally K. Daly | Sixth Doctor, Peri | November 2019 |

=== Series 6 (2021) ===
| No. | Title | Directed by | Written by | Featuring | Released |
|---|---|---|---|---|---|
| 1 | "Return of the Cybermen" | Nicholas Briggs | Gerry Davis, adapted by John Dorney | Fourth Doctor, Harry Sullivan, Sarah Jane Smith | March 2021 |
| 2 | "The Doomsday Contract" | Nicholas Briggs | John Lloyd, adapted by Nev Fountain | Fourth Doctor, Romana II and K9 Mk 2 | March 2021 |

=== Special (2022) ===
On 18 January 2021, Russell T Davies, former and current Doctor Who showrunner revealed that, in preparation for a watch party for "The Runaway Bride", he found an old spec script that he submitted to the BBC in 1985–86, titled "Mind of the Hodiac". The audio adaptation of the script was co-written by Scott Handcock, and released in March 2022. It features the Sixth Doctor, alongside companion Mel.

| No. | Title | Directed by | Written by | Featuring | Released |
|---|---|---|---|---|---|
| 1 | "Mind of the Hodiac" | Scott Handcock | Russell T Davies and Scott Handcock | Sixth Doctor, Mel Bush | March 2022 |

=== Series 7 (2023) ===
| No. | Title | Directed by | Written by | Featuring | Released |
|---|---|---|---|---|---|
| 1 | "Daleks! Genesis of Terror" | Samuel Clemens | Terry Nation, additional dialogue by Simon Guerrier | Fourth Doctor, Harry Sullivan, Sarah Jane Smith, Davros, Daleks | May 2023 |
| 2 | "Doctor Who and The Ark" | Samuel Clemens | John Lucarotti, adapted by Jonathan Morris | Fourth Doctor, Harry Sullivan, Sarah Jane Smith | June 2023 |

=== Series 8 (2024) ===
| No. | Title | Directed by | Written by | Featuring | Released |
|---|---|---|---|---|---|
| 1 | "Operation Werewolf" | David O'Mahony | Douglas Camfield & Robert Kitts, Adapted by Jonathan Morris | Second Doctor, Jamie McCrimmon, Zoe Heriot | July 2024 |
| 2 | "Deathworld" | David O'Mahony | Bob Baker & Dave Martin, adapted by John Dorney | Third Doctor, Second Doctor, First Doctor, Jo Grant, Brigadier Lethbridge-Stewart, Jamie McCrimmon | August 2024 |

=== Series 9 (2025) ===
| No. | Title | Directed by | Written by | Featuring | Released |
|---|---|---|---|---|---|
| 1 | "Genesis of the Cybermen" | David O'Mahony | Gerry Davis, Adapted by David K. Barnes | Fifth Doctor, Tegan, Nyssa, Adric, Cybermen | March 2025 |
| 2 | "Alixion" | David O'Mahony | Robin Mukherjee | Seventh Doctor, Ace | September 2025 |
