= The Mysterious Planet =

143a – The Trial of a Time Lord: The Mysterious Planet
- Doctor Who serial

Cast
- Doctor: Colin Baker – Sixth Doctor
- Companion: Nicola Bryant – Peri Brown
- Others: Lynda Bellingham – The Inquisitor; Michael Jayston – The Valeyard; Tony Selby – Sabalom Glitz; Joan Sims – Queen Katryca; Glen Murphy – Dibber; Tom Chadbon – Merdeen; Roger Brierley – Drathro; David Rodigan – Broken Tooth; Adam Blackwood – Balazar; Timothy Walker – Grell; Billy McColl – Humker; Sion Tudor Owen – Tandrell

Production
- Directed by: Nicholas Mallett
- Written by: Robert Holmes
- Script editor: Eric Saward
- Produced by: John Nathan-Turner
- Music by: Dominic Glynn
- Production code: 7A
- Series: Season 23
- Running time: 4 episodes, 25 minutes each
- First broadcast: 6 September 1986
- Last broadcast: 27 September 1986

Chronology
← Preceded by Revelation of the Daleks	Followed by → The Trial of a Time Lord: Mindwarp

The Mysterious Planet is the first serial of the larger narrative known as The Trial of a Time Lord which encompasses the whole of the 23rd season of the British science fiction television series Doctor Who. It was first broadcast in four weekly parts on BBC1 from 6 to 27 September 1986. The title The Mysterious Planet is not used on-screen and only appears in the serial's scripts with the four episodes that comprise the story being transmitted as The Trial of a Time Lord Parts One to Four.

In the serial, the Sixth Doctor (Colin Baker) is put on trial by his own people, the Time Lords, accused of meddling in the affairs of Earth far in the future, when it has been renamed Ravolox and relocated light years from its original location. Much of the story consists of video testimony presented by the prosecutor the Valeyard (Michael Jayston) of the Doctor attempting to stop the robot Drathro from causing an explosion that would threaten the entire universe.

== Plot ==
Events of the serial are framed on an arcing plot that carries through the other three serials of the 23rd season. In this, the Sixth Doctor is forced to land the TARDIS aboard a Gallifreyan space station, where he is brought into a courtroom. The Inquisitor informs the Doctor he is on trial for conduct unbecoming a Time Lord; evidence will be presented by the Valeyard. The first evidence is shown through video footage, taken from the Matrix, of the Doctor's recent involvement in the planet Ravolox, where the Valeyard shows that the Doctor willingly became involved in the affairs of the planet. The Doctor denies these charges as the Valeyard brings them. After showing the video, the Valeyard affirms he has more evidence sufficient to call for the end of the Doctor's life.

As shown by the court evidence, the Doctor and Peri land on Ravolox, a largely uninhabited planet they note bears an unusual similarity to Earth. As they walk, they are observed by Sabalom Glitz and Dibber, a pair of mercenaries out to obtain an archive of highly advanced technological secrets being held by a robot named Drathro. The Doctor and Peri find a tunnel and enter to find remains that appear to be that of the Marble Arch tube station on the London Underground Central line, despite the planet being several light years away from where Earth should be. Peri becomes despondent over her world's apparent fate and refuses to accompany the Doctor as he journeys further into the tunnels and encounters a group of humans serving Drathro, who demands that the Doctor repair its malfunctioning black light power system.

Glitz and Dibber believe that they can disable Drathro by dismantling the antenna for the black light system, which is worshipped as a totem by a tribe made of people who escaped from Marble Arch. The tribe's queen, Katryca, immediately sees through Glitz when he falsely claims the antenna to be responsible for the planet's devastation and has them thrown in prison, later doing the same with Peri when she is captured by the tribe and refuses an offer to join them. The trio escape, as does the Doctor, pursued by a primitive service robot, with the tribe saving him from the robot, but capturing the Doctor, Peri and the mercenaries. Katryca is in no mood to hear out the Doctor, thanks to Glitz's lies and Dibber's blowing up the antenna during their escape, and has them all put back in prison, where Glitz reveals that the planet is indeed Earth, and that the planet was somehow devastated and moved across space shortly after Drathro's creators stole the archive of secrets from another, unidentified civilisation. The service robot returns and tries to abduct the Doctor, but the tribe disable it, with Katryca mistakenly believing the robot to be Drathro and ordering the tribe to raid Marble Arch. There, they encounter the real Drathro, who electrocutes Katryca when she tries to attack it.

Returning to Drathro's chamber, the Doctor tries to persuade it to let him shut down the black light system, the imminent explosion of which could in the worst case destroy the whole universe. Drathro refuses, as it will cease to function either way, until Glitz dupes it into thinking it can be repaired if it comes aboard his ship. After it leaves with the two mercenaries, the Doctor manages to contain the explosion of the black light system to the chamber, but the surge of energy destroys Drathro, and with it, the only copy of the archive. The remains of the tribe offer to take in those humans that were living underground, and the Doctor and Peri say their goodbyes, though the Doctor remains suspicious about what happened to Earth.

== Production ==
Episode	Title	Run time	Original release date	UK viewers (millions)
1	"Part One"	24:57	6 September 1986	4.9
2	"Part Two"	24:44	13 September 1986	4.9
3	"Part Three"	24:18	20 September 1986	3.9
4	"Part Four"	24:20	27 September 1986	3.7

=== Preproduction ===
In February 1985, the BBC announced that the planned twenty-third season of Doctor Who had been cancelled. After vocal protests by the press and Doctor Who fans (including a charity single, "Doctor in Distress"), the BBC announced that the programme was merely on "hiatus", and would return in September 1986. Several stories which had been planned or commissioned for the original Season 23 were abandoned in favour of an overarching "trial" theme, reflecting the fact that the programme itself was on trial at the BBC.

This story was the last complete Doctor Who story written by Robert Holmes. Its plot is similar to Holmes' first contribution to Doctor Who, The Krotons. In both stories, an alien machine subjugates a humanoid civilisation and forces its brightest young people into its service.

=== Production ===
The opening model shot of the Time Lord Space Station where the trial is held throughout the season was the most expensive model shot from the classic series run (costing more than £8,000). The sequence depicts the Time Lord Space Station orbiting in space then dragging the TARDIS inside via the use of a tractor beam.

From this serial until the end of the show in 1989, all location work would be recorded on Outside Broadcast (OB) tape instead of the usual 16mm film. The only footage shot on film for this episode was the opening special effects shot of the TARDIS. The BBC had been encouraging the replacement of film cameras with OB cameras since the early 1980s on the grounds that they were cheaper, and mixed with studio-shot material better. John Nathan-Turner had actually wanted to switch to OB shooting as early as Peter Davison's first season in 1982, but met with resistance from the directors working on the show at the time, so was overruled.

Roger Brierley, who voiced the role of Drathro, was originally supposed to wear the robot costume and physically play the role, but it was realised that the costume would not fit Brierley's 6 ft 4 in (1.93 m) frame. Therefore, a special effects assistant, Paul McGuinness, who helped design the costume, was called in to physically play Drathro, while Brierley spoke his lines from off-camera.

=== Post-production ===
Dominic Glynn was hired to score the incidental music for The Mysterious Planet, then John Nathan-Turner offered him the chance to rearrange the opening title music. His new score for the opening theme was the shortest-lived, lasting for this season alone (not counting the unused 1973 version by Delia Derbyshire and Paddy Kingsland).

=== Cast notes ===
The actor playing Merdeen, Tom Chadbon, had previously appeared in the 1979 Fourth Doctor serial City of Death.

=== Reception ===
The serial generally receives a poor response, similar to the other stories of this era. Patrick Mulkern of Radio Times was critical of the serial: "a dismal last gasp from ailing writer Robert Holmes. The travails of the Saxon-like Tribe of the Free and whey-faced tunnel-dwellers are totally unengaging. Lifeless characters, clumsy robots, flimsy cliffhangers, zero peril." AV Club's Christopher Bahn said: "'Mysterious Planet' never really takes off, laden down by the script, a lot of time wasted running around in the forest or down corridors, and some atrocious acting by some of the minor characters, particularly Joan Sims as Katryca, the Boadica-esque warrior queen who sounds like she's escaped from a community-theater Shakespeare in the Park production."

== Commercial releases ==
=== In print ===
The Mysterious Planet
- Author: Terrance Dicks
- Cover artist: Tony Masero
- Series: Doctor Who book: Target novelisations
- Release number: 127
- Publisher: Target Books
- Publication date: 19 November 1987 (Hardback) 21 April 1988 (Paperback)
- ISBN: 0-426-20319-4

A novelisation of this serial, written by Terrance Dicks, was published by Target Books in November 1987.

=== Home media ===
In October 1993, this story was released on VHS as part of the three-tape The Trial of a Time Lord set. It was released on DVD on 29 September 2008, similarly boxed with the other three stories of this season. This serial was also released as part of the Doctor Who DVD Files in Issue 129 on 11 December 2013.

These four episodes, along with the remaining 10 episodes, were released on blu-ray on October 7 2019. Extended versions of these four episodes (along with extended versions of the remaining 10 episodes) were included as extras on Discs 5 & 6.
