= Chris Clough =

English television producer and director

- Born: 9 March 1951 (age 75); Harrogate, Yorkshire, England
- Education: Leeds University
- Occupations: Television producer and Director

Chris Clough (born 9 March 1951 in Harrogate, Yorkshire, England) is an English television producer and director.

== Early life and education ==
Clough studied English literature at Leeds University. He went there because they had a television studio available for the students. He used the material he created there to apply for jobs and he got a job as a researcher at Granada Television. He then started directing. In 1982 he went freelance and in that decade he directed episodes of the television soap operas Brookside and EastEnders.

== Career ==
While working on EastEnders, Clough got to know one of the assistant directors, Gary Downie, who had also worked on Doctor Who. He got an interview with Doctor Who producer John Nathan-Turner and he later directed six serials of the series — Terror of the Vervoids, The Ultimate Foe, Delta and the Bannermen, Dragonfire, The Happiness Patrol and Silver Nemesis.

In the 1990s, Clough directed several episodes of The Bill and he also started producing the show in the latter half of the decade. He then went on to produce several other series, including Ballykissangel, Black Cab, and The Ghost Squad. He produced the E4 teen drama Skins, running from 2007 to 2013, and the Channel 4 drama Sirens in 2011. In 2014, he was the producer of the first eight-part series of The Missing.
