= The Valeyard =

Fictional Doctor Who character

The Doctor
The Valeyard
- Doctor Who character
- Michael Jayston as the Valeyard
- First appearance: The Mysterious Planet (1986)
- Introduced by: John Nathan-Turner
- Portrayed by: Michael Jayston; Geoffrey Hughes (Popplewick disguise)
- Preceded by: Twelfth Doctor
- Succeeded by: Thirteenth Doctor

Information
- Appearances: 4 stories (14 episodes)
- Chronology: Season 23 (1986)

The Valeyard (/ˈvæl.i.ɑːrd/, VALLEY-ard) is a fictional character from the long-running British science fiction television series Doctor Who. He appears in the show's twenty-third season, dubbed The Trial of a Time Lord. The season's four serials are interconnected through one overarching plot line in which the Valeyard serves as a court prosecutor in the trial of the Sixth Doctor. Within the series narrative, the Doctor is an alien who hails from a race known as the Time Lords. They travel in time and space in the TARDIS, frequently with companions. At the end of the Doctor's life, the Doctor regenerates, changing their physical appearance and aspects of their personality.

Toward the end of the trial, the Valeyard is revealed to secretly be an incarnation of the Doctor, being an "amalgamation of the darker sides" of the Doctor who hails from somewhere toward the end of the Doctor's life. The Valeyard had been working with the Time Lords to incriminate the Doctor in exchange for the Doctor's remaining regenerations. The Valeyard attempts to escape and destroy the Time Lords but is stopped by the Doctor. The Valeyard is presumed dead but is revealed to have escaped at the end of the episode. The Valeyard has subsequently appeared in various pieces of Doctor Who spin-off media.

The Valeyard was introduced by the show's then-producer John Nathan-Turner and the show's script editor Eric Saward, who created him to serve as the prosecutor of the trial and act as an overarching antagonist of the season in favor of character the Master, whom Saward felt would be too obvious as an antagonist. Though the Valeyard was originally supposed to have his fate left unknown, alongside the Doctor's, to create a shocking ending, rewrites would result in the Valeyard surviving, allowing him to return in later episodes. The Valeyard has been portrayed by Michael Jayston in all of his appearances, including in audio dramas released following The Trial of a Time Lord.

The Valeyard has been met with a positive response for his role in the narrative. He has been the subject of analysis due to his relationship with the Doctor and the nature of his existence within the series' narrative.

== Character history ==
Doctor Who is a long-running British science-fiction television series that began in 1963. It stars its protagonist, The Doctor, an alien who travels through time and space in a ship known as the TARDIS, as well as their travelling companions. When the Doctor dies, they are able to undergo a process known as "regeneration", completely changing the Doctor's appearance and personality. Throughout their travels, the Doctor often comes into conflict with various alien species and antagonists.

=== In the show ===
The Valeyard appears in all four segments of the 1986 story The Trial of a Time Lord – The Mysterious Planet, Mindwarp, Terror of the Vervoids and The Ultimate Foe. During the events of the story, the Sixth Doctor (Colin Baker) is put on trial by his people, known as the Time Lords, for interfering with history, which the Time Lords have an oath against doing. The Valeyard (Michael Jayston) acts as the court prosecutor in the trial, presenting evidence against the Doctor's innocence.

As the serial progresses, it is revealed that the Valeyard tampered with evidence, allowing him to paint the Doctor in a negative light. The Doctor's old enemy the Master (Anthony Ainley) reveals that the Valeyard is actually a future incarnation of the Doctor, stated to be "amalgamation of the darker sides" of the Doctor's nature, from somewhere toward the end of the Doctor's life. The Valeyard has been working with the Time Lords to cover up their involvement in moving the planet Earth from its proper place in the universe and killing nearly every human on the planet; as the Doctor discovered the Time Lords' actions in the past, they wanted to execute him under the pretence of a trial. In return, the Valeyard would have received the Doctor's remaining regenerations, extending the Valeyard's lifespan.

The Valeyard had been planning to kill the Time Lords after they had given him this, however, and when his identity and plans are revealed to the court, he escapes into the Matrix, a massive data repository for the Time Lords. The Master and the Valeyard are both seemingly trapped inside the Matrix and destroyed; the Doctor escapes, and the Time Lords allow the Doctor to leave, the charges against him dropped. As the Doctor leaves, the Valeyard is revealed to have escaped in disguise as another Time Lord.

=== In other media ===
In the 1995 Virgin Publishing novel Millennial Rites, the Valeyard briefly emerged from the Sixth Doctor's consciousness, taking over the Doctor's personality and actions, but is repressed by the Doctor. The 1997 BBC Books novel The Eight Doctors sees the Eighth Doctor return to an alternate version of the trial of the Sixth Doctor in which the Valeyard is about to execute him. The Eighth Doctor dismisses the evidence brought up by the Valeyard, and has an inquiry be held into the Valeyard's creation and the motivations behind the Sixth Doctor's trial, but the Valeyard disappears before anything can be determined. The 1998 novel Matrix sees the Valeyard using the "Dark Matrix," the repository of all of the Time Lords' most evil impulses, and tries to use it to take revenge on the Doctor. The Valeyard is eventually killed by a lightning bolt being generated by the Valeyard's damaged TARDIS as the Dark Matrix escapes the Valeyard's control.

A novel from the late Doctor Who author Craig Hinton, Time's Champion, was intended to feature the Valeyard and elaborate upon the origins of the Valeyard. However, the novel was rejected by BBC Books. Co-writer Chris McKeon would go on to complete the novel upon Hinton's death and release it unofficially. The novel was edited and published by David J. Howe as a benefit for the British Heart Foundation.

The 2003 Big Finish Productions' Doctor Who Unbound audio drama He Jests at Scars... documents an alternative timeline in which the Valeyard has defeated the Doctor and gone on to ransack time and space. It is revealed, however, that he damaged time irreparably, and reality was collapsing, with the Valeyard too scared to even move, fearing he will damage the timeline more. He is eventually trapped in his TARDIS, unable to escape, until the end of time. Another Big Finish audio, Trial of the Valeyard (2013), has the Valeyard captured and put on trial by the Time Lords. During the drama, the Valeyard claims he was created by the Doctor's final incarnation, who was experimenting with ways to break the regeneration limit. The Valeyard attempts to kill the Doctor but is thwarted and escapes, leaving the Doctor to contemplate the truth of the Valeyard's words. In the 2015 audio The Sixth Doctor: The Last Adventure, the Valeyard masterminds a plot that will allow him to take control of the Doctor's body. Although the Valeyard's plan succeeds, the Doctor is able to manipulate events so that the Sixth Doctor is forced to regenerate, killing the Valeyard. The Valeyard re-appears in the 2019 audio The War Valeyard, with the Time Lords deciding to utilise a copy of the Valeyard as a soldier in the Time War, an intergalactic conflict between the Time Lords and a race known as the Daleks. The Valeyard is left trapped in a time loop fighting Daleks under the belief that he is the Doctor.

== Conception and development ==
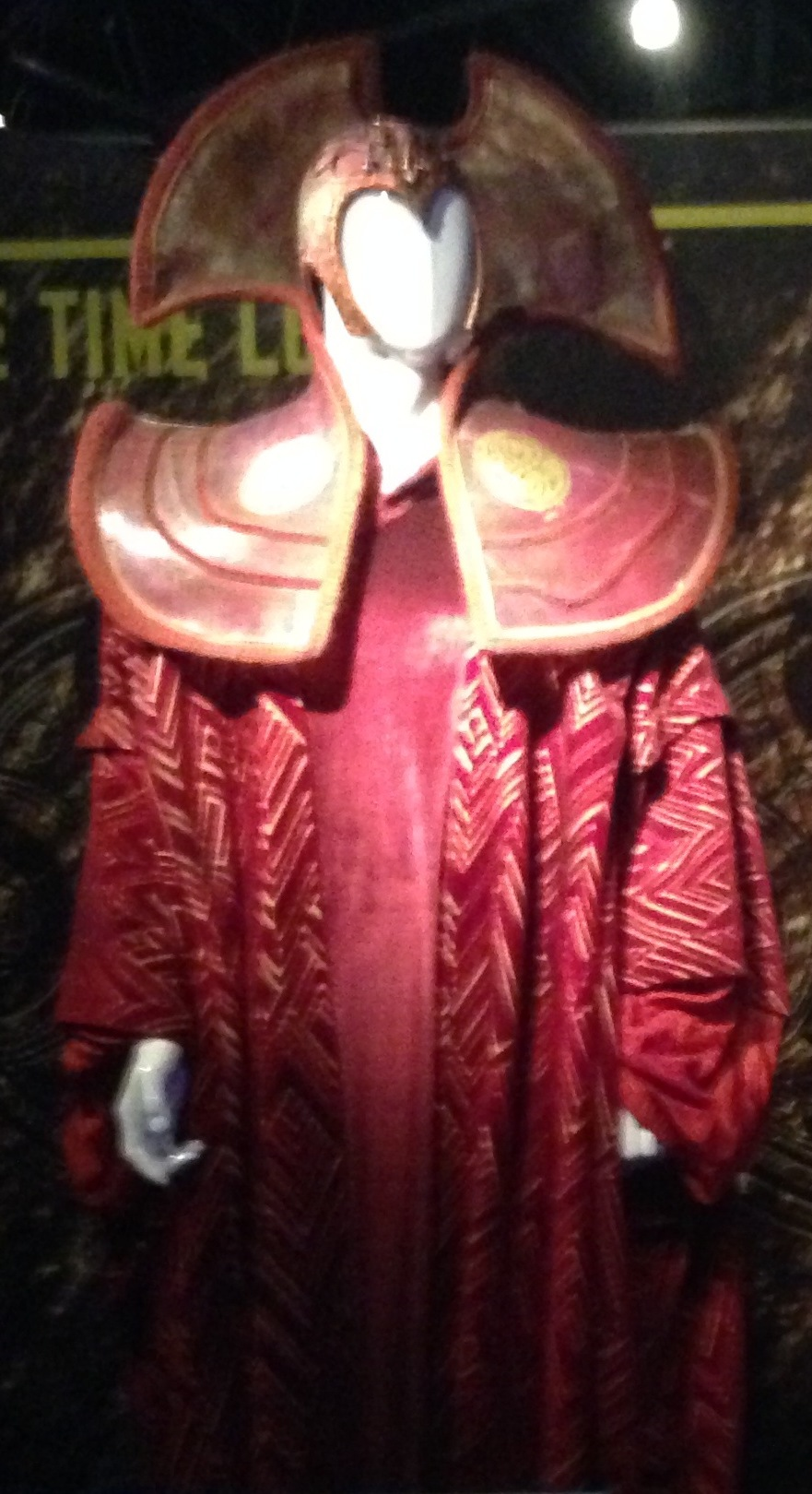
A Time Lord costume, as seen on display at the Doctor Who Experience. The costumes of the Time Lords inspired the appearance of the Valeyard's costume.

The Valeyard was created for The Trial of a Time Lord, a season of the show which had a series of four different serials that would acted as parts of one over-arching plot. This was set on the Doctor's home planet of Gallifrey, where his people, the Time Lords, had put him on trial. The Valeyard, alongside several other characters introduced during the season, was created by producer John Nathan-Turner and script editor Eric Saward. The Valeyard was described as "tall and lean, with sharp angular features" that would have elicited imagery of a predatory bird. It was also stated that he should be revealed as a future incarnation of the Doctor. Though it had been suggested that the Master should serve as the main, overarching antagonist, Saward felt this would be too obvious of a twist, and favored the Valeyard as a villain.

The original ending of the episodes would have seen the Valeyard and the Doctor become trapped in the Matrix, with it being unclear if either survived. This was done due to Doctor Who being under threat of cancellation, with the production team wishing to generate a shocking ending that would enable the series to continue. Disagreements over this script, particularly its ending, resulted in Saward retracting the original final episode, resulting in writers Pip and Jane Baker being brought on to rewrite the final episode. Nathan-Turner requested the Bakers include an ending in which the Valeyard is shown to have escaped, allowing him to return in later serials.

The Valeyard was portrayed by actor Michael Jayston in the serials, and Jayston would go on to reprise the role in audio dramas produced by Big Finish Productions. The Valeyard's costume was heavily inspired by pre-existing Time Lord costumes, though it was an entirely new costume constructed for the episodes. The Valeyard retained the same costume throughout the serials, though the final serial, The Ultimate Foe, would depict the Valeyard without his cap. Briefly in the serial, Geoffrey Hughes portrays a character named "Mr. Popplewick" while the Doctor is exploring the Matrix; this was later revealed to actually be the Valeyard in disguise.

According to Doctor Who novel writer Lance Parkin, the Valeyard was banned from appearing in Doctor Who novels published by Virgin Books, particularly those of the New Adventures range. While the novels tended to shy away from re-using old antagonists and newer writers were encouraged to write original characters, the Valeyard was one of two pre-existing characters with a specific ban in place to not use his character, with the only other antagonist to be banned being the Daleks. Total Sci-Fi Online writer Johnathan Wilkins stated this was a result of the Valeyard being deemed too "problematic" as a character.

== Reception and analysis ==
Graeme Burk and Robert Smith in the book The Doctors Are In: The Essential and Unofficial Guide to Doctor Who's Greatest Time Lord highlighted the Valeyard's mysterious nature and his execution within the context of the Doctor's trial, praising the character's concept. However, they stated that the character would likely be better off not returning to the series, as the character's nature meant he would not work as well outside the context of the trial. John Kenneth Muir, a literary critic, writing in A Critical History of Doctor Who on Television, described the Valeyard's survival at the end of the story as representing how "evil will never die". He described how the character was reflective of a more nihilistic outlook present in the Sixth Doctor's era, as the Valeyard's presence in the Doctor's future indicated that the Doctor was now destined to become a villain, and that nothing could change that.

The book Doctor Who and Philosophy: Bigger on the Inside analysed the paradoxical nature of the Valeyard's existence, stating that the character is only able to exist due to the show's time-travelling nature and potential for parallel timelines where things are different in-universe, comparing the Valeyard to the 1941 short story The Garden of Forking Paths, which discusses the nature of parallel timelines and the incompatible nature of these events. The book Doctor Who and History: Critical Essays on Imagining the Past highlighted the Valeyard's appearance in the audio drama He Jests at Scars..., stating that the drama's ending, in which the Valeyard is trapped until the end of time because he could not chance altering history, highlighted the delicacy of history, in which every choice made in history has its consequence. It also highlights how the Valeyard's own decisions resulted in his current position, further elaborating on the idea.

J.S Mackley, writing in The Palgrave Handbook of Contemporary Gothic, considered the Valeyard to be an example of how people are forced to acknowledge and accept the darker, repressed aspects of their personality; he also notes how the presence of two versions of the Doctor act as a "doubling", symbolising death. The book The Greatest Show in the Galaxy: The Discerning Fan's Guide to Doctor Who described how the Valeyard symbolised the Jungian Shadow; the Shadow acts as the dual, darker nature repressed in all living beings. The book stated that the Valeyard was a symbol for the Doctor's own self-hatred, acting as an antithesis to everything the character stands for in the series.
