= Michael Feeney Callan =

Irish novelist and poet

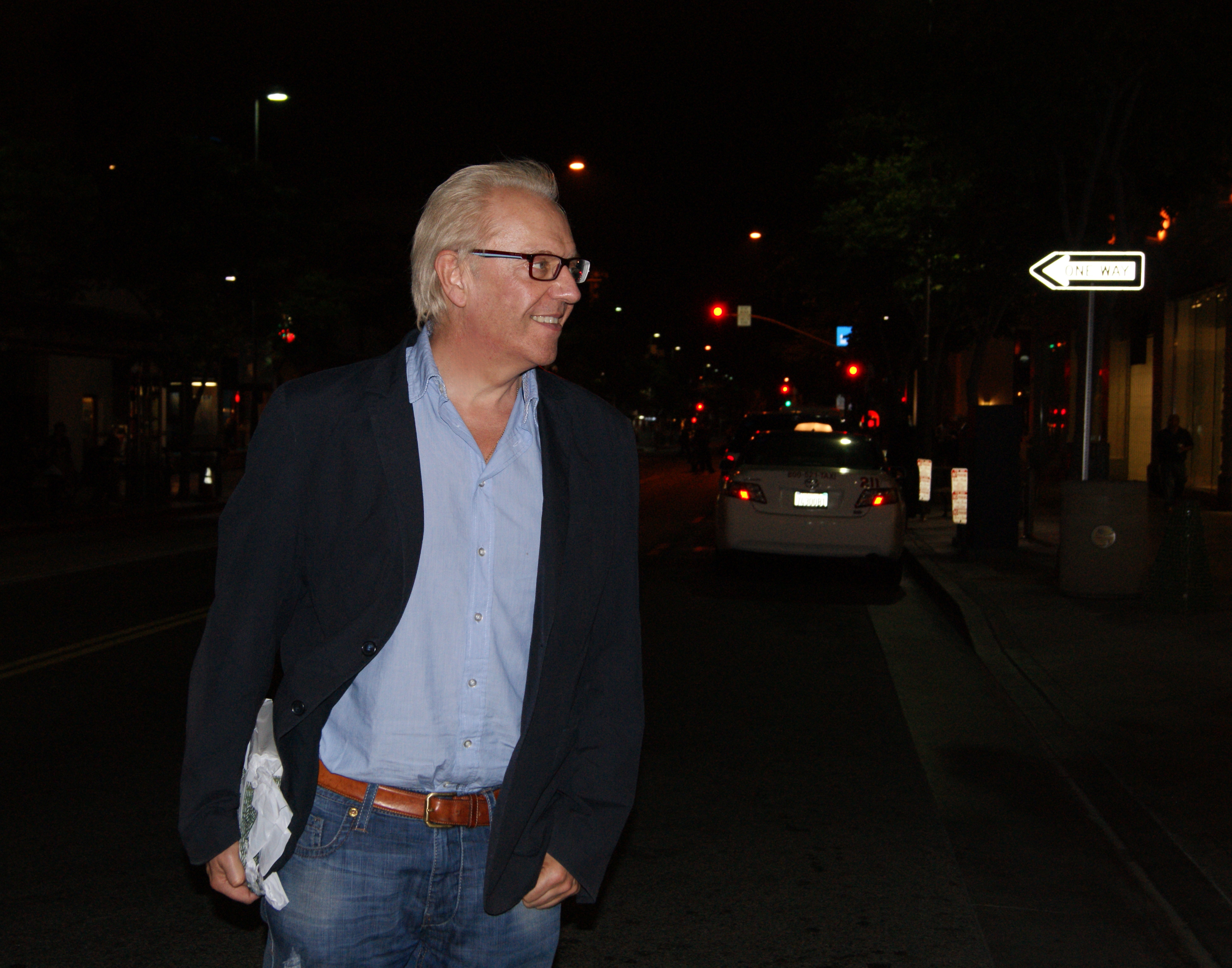
- Callan in New York City in June 2011
- Born: Drumcondra, Dublin, Ireland
- Occupations: Novelist, screenwriter, biographer, poet
- Years active: 1977–present
- Spouse: Ree Ward
- Children: 2
- Website: www.michaelfeeneycallan.com

Michael Feeney Callan is an Irish novelist, screenwriter, biographer, and poet. He has won awards for his short fiction and also for non-fiction. He joined BBC television drama as a story editor, and wrote screenplays for The Professionals and for American television.

Callan wrote the Irish police drama series The Burke Enigma, starring Donal McCann, and Love Is, starring Gabriel Byrne, and went on to write and direct a number of documentaries, among them The Beach Boys Today, a film that marked the band's 30th anniversary. He has published several novels and has written biographies of Julie Christie, Sean Connery, Anthony Hopkins, Richard Harris, and Robert Redford. In 2013, he published his second volume of poetry, An Argument for Sin.

== Early life ==
Callan was born to Michael Callan, an engineer, and Margaret (née Feeney) in Drumcondra, Dublin.

== Poetry ==
Callan started writing in his teens, publishing poetry in David Marcus' New Irish Writing. His first collection, Fifty Fingers (which includes his first poem, Barbara), was published in 2003. His second volume of poetry, An Argument for Sin, was published in 2013. Callan describes the work as "a memoir in poetry, much influenced by Yeats' A Vision and Poe's Eureka." The book comprises poems written between 2003 and 2013.

== Books ==
Callan won the Hennessy Literary Award for his short story, Baccy, and was anthologised in Best Irish Short Stories (Elek, London, 1978). Thereafter he diversified widely, publishing fiction and non-fiction.

Callan wrote a series of British television adaptation novels of differing genres, including Capital City (ITV), Target: The Bronze Heist (Target), Sweet Sixteen and Jockey School (all BBC), and the novel Lovers and Dancers, set in Ireland during the famine. Lovers and Dancers was inspired by Anthony Trollope's early writing and was reissued by Random House in the mid-1990s. In 2002, Callan published Did You Miss Me?, a novel exploring difficult female themes which was issued in a revised version in 2014.

Callan has written biographies of Julie Christie, Sean Connery, Anthony Hopkins, Robert Redford, and his longtime friend Richard Harris. The Connery book was referred to as "a necessity for Connery and Bond fans" by the Los Angeles Times and is the sole reference work on Connery quoted in Albert "Cubby" Broccoli's autobiography. A new edition, revised and updated to cover Connery's formal retirement, was published by Nouveau Monde Editions, Paris, in March 2012 (ISBN 978-1852279929). His biography of Redford (Robert Redford: The Biography; Knopf, 2011) was chosen by the Sunday Times as one of its recommended Best Books of 2011. It was subsequently awarded the Lucien Barriere Prize for Literature by the jury of the Deauville American Film Festival.

For fifteen years from the mid-nineties, Callan travelled throughout the United States interviewing more than 300 sources for Robert Redford: The Biography (Knopf, 2011). The book was written with the co-operation of Redford, who traveled to Ireland to work with Callan and provided access to his diaries, scripts and personal records. In the course of its preparation, Callan spent extensive time with many of Redford's key collaborators. Entertainment Weekly selected Robert Redford: The Biography as one of its 10 Best Movie Books of 2011. Robert Redford: The Biography was published in mass market paperback by Vintage Books in 2012.

== Writing for radio and television ==
Callan began writing for radio at the outset of his career. He adapted The Dead Secret by Wilkie Collins and Scales of Justice by Dame Ngaio Marsh for RTÉ Radio, and wrote the original plays The Train and Tripp. He contributed more than 20 plays to the Dan Treston-produced series Treasure House, dramatising the lives of scientists and artists from Johannes Kepler to Edgar Allan Poe and H. G. Wells.

Callan's first screenplay was the crime series The Burke Enigma, a six-hour film production for RTÉ, which starred Ray McAnally and Donal McCann, and went forward as RTÉ's drama entry for the 1979 Prix Italia. According to Callan, this work was "influenced by the film noir I loved as a kid, and by Robert Altman's (filming) style." Subsequently, Callan joined BBC television drama in London, where he story-edited the detective series Shoestring. Simultaneously, at ITV, he wrote for the action series The Professionals. In the 1980s, Callan collaborated with Frederick Forsyth on Public Broadcasting Service-aired adaptations of Forsyth's stories Privilege and A Careful Man (Mobil Showcase).

Collaborating with Anthony Shaffer, Callan was commissioned in 1987 by HBO to write The Negotiator, based on a treatment by Forsyth. The series was announced but never filmed and Forsyth later redeveloped the outline into a novel.

In 2011, Callan wrote and produced Channel 4's Sounds from the Cities. The series was presented by actor Mathew Horne, and featured live performances from Imelda May, K.T. Tunstall, Jon Fratelli, the Joy Formidable and Gruff Rhys of Super Furry Animals.

=== Doctor Who: The Children of January ===
Callan was commissioned to write a two-part Doctor Who serial for the BBC entitled The Children of January. This was in final revision when the series was suspended for 18 months by BBC1 controller Michael Grade in 1985.

On his website, Callan responded to an enquiry on this subject thus:

It was to be a season closer, not a series termination. But the BBC decided in mid-season that the show had run its course and, in the middle eighties, I think they were right. But I loved my episode, which was delivered late in 1985. I created a race of runaway proto-humans called the Z'ros, sort of 'human bees', of which I still have the fondest nightmares. The Children of January, incidentally, refers to renegade outcasts of a dawning "parallel universe" civilisation that was abandoned.

Callan was commissioned to write the story on 5 February 1985, and it was to be directed by EastEnders director Bob Gabriel, who was new to the show. The intended transmission for the story was 13 February to 6 March 1986. However, on 27 February 1985, it was announced by BBC News that the production of Doctor Who was to be suspended on an 18-month hiatus until spring of 1986. The production team also had rework the episode format from two-part, 45 minute episodes to four-part, 25 minute episodes, but the story was dropped when it was decided that The Trial of a Time Lord season would have fourteen episodic parts with 25 minute episodes instead.

Big Finish Productions planned on adapting The Children of January, but these plans were ultimately dropped due to Callan's other commitments.

== Film and directing ==
Callan made a significant contribution to the regeneration of the Irish film industry during the 1980s. Joining Morgan O'Sullivan's pioneering production set-up, Tara Productions, Callan collaborated in a strategy to acquire the defunct National Film Studios (as Ardmore Studios was then named), alter film investment law and attract Hollywood-based co-production into Ireland. Ardmore Studios was bought in partnership with the NEA and MTM Hollywood in November 1986.

In the 1990s, Callan started directing. His directorial debut was with the six-part series My Riviera, in which Roger Moore, James Coburn, Sylvia Kristel, Charles Aznavour and Joan Collins reviewed personal favourite places along the Côte d'Azur, an area Callan has frequented since the 1980s. The series was screened on ITV and throughout the world. In 1993 Callan wrote, produced and directed The Beach Boys Today, a co-production with RTÉ, documenting the final touring days of the Carl Wilson-led Beach Boys. He then made the documentary Back to Enchantment, about animators Gary Goldman and Don Bluth (An American Tail, Anastasia), which tied in with the release of Warner Bros' Thumbelina.

In 1994 Callan wrote, co-produced and co-directed Perry Como's final concert for PBS. Como, then in his 80th year, was unwell during the filming, but expressed himself exhilarated by the experience and later said that he had always wished to end his career in Ireland. After a decade working on the Redford project, in 2005 Callan resumed directing with the film Luke Kelly: The Performer, which topped DVD charts in Ireland for eight weeks, achieving platinum sales status.

In November 2010 Callan co-founded an interactive television-based resource for new artists and musicians, BOBCOM. As part of its creative incentive scheme, in July 2011 Callan wrote and directed the two-day Magical History Tour event in Liverpool, culminating with a 7-hour live session from the Cavern Club streamed on YouTube. The event included a re-creation of the Beatles' 1967 magic bus tour and a re-creation of the day in July 1957 when John Lennon met Paul McCartney.

Also in 2011, he produced and directed the start-up episodes of The 2UBE Live from the Liverpool Institute for the Performing Arts (LIPA), a student production that was streamed on YouTube.

== Painting ==
Callan's art, in watercolour, oils and bronze sculpture, has been exhibited by the Blue Leaf Gallery in Dublin. Irish Times art critic Aidan Dunne described his work as "a love affair with French painting", reflecting Callan's interest in L'École de Nice. Callan started painting in Chateauneuf de Grasse in the South of France in the eighties and titled his first exhibition, staged at Dublin's Blue Leaf Marino gallery in May 2002, A Workshop in France.

== Other media work ==
Callan has contributed to the arts programme Arena, on RTÉ Radio 1. He has reviewed books for the Irish Independent and contributed journalism to Vanity Fair, GQ Magazine and the Irish Times. He contributed to "The Art and Craft of Film Biography: A Symposium" in the summer 2013 issue of Cineaste magazine. He co-created and developed the multi-platform arts project BOBCOM with producer Steve Levine.

In December 2007, Callan joined the advisory board of the Los Angeles Irish Film Festival.

== Awards ==
Callan won the Hennessy Literary Award in 1977 for his short fiction.

In 2022 he won the Prix Littéraire Lucien Barrière, awarded by the jury of the Deauville American Film Festival for his non-fiction book Robert Redford: The Biography.

== Personal life ==
After living in London, Callan resettled in Dublin with his wife Ree and their two children. He frequently spends time at Châteauneuf de Grasse, where he paints and sculpts.
