= Peri Brown =

Fictional character from Doctor Who

- Doctor Who character
- Peri in Attack of the Cybermen (1985)
- First appearance: Planet of Fire (1984)
- Last appearance: Tales of the TARDIS (2023)
- Portrayed by: Nicola Bryant
- Non-canonical appearances: Dimensions in Time (1993)
- Duration: 1984–1986, 1993, 2023

In-universe information
- Full name: Perpugilliam Brown
- Alias: "The Warrior Queen"
- Nickname: Peri
- Species: Human
- Gender: Female
- Occupation: Botany student
- Affiliation: Fifth Doctor; Sixth Doctor
- Family: Howard Foster (stepfather)
- Origin: Baltimore, Maryland, U.S.
- Home: Earth
- Home era: 20th century

Perpugilliam "Peri" Brown is a fictional character played by Nicola Bryant in the long-running British science fiction television series Doctor Who.

An American botany major from Fells Point in Baltimore, Maryland, Peri is a companion of the Fifth (Peter Davison) and Sixth Doctor (Colin Baker) and a regular in the programme from 1984 to 1986, appearing in a total of 11 stories (33 episodes).

== Fictional biography ==
Peri first appeared in the Fifth Doctor serial Planet of Fire, in which she encountered the Doctor and Turlough on the island of Lanzarote. After an encounter with the Master and the shape-changing android Kamelion (who disguises himself as her stepfather, Professor Howard Foster), Peri asked to join the Fifth Doctor on his travels, while Turlough departed to return to his home planet of Trion. (The identity of Peri's mother was not revealed in the televised series – but see below.)

By the end of the Fifth Doctor's final story, The Caves of Androzani, both the Doctor and Peri were suffering from spectrox poisoning, so the Fifth Doctor decided to give what antidote remains to Peri, sacrificing himself to save her. As she looks on, he regenerates into the Sixth Doctor, and she continues to travel with him, despite the temporarily unstable Doctor attempting to strangle her after his transformation (in his debut story, The Twin Dilemma).

Peri is a bright and spirited young woman, an undergraduate and thus likely around twenty years of age, who travelled with the Doctor because, like many of his companions, she wanted to see the universe. Although she shared a more abrasive relationship with the Sixth Doctor, there was an undercurrent of affection in their verbal sparring.

Peri travelled with the Doctor for an undisclosed period of time; some sources say she travelled with him for mere months, while others say years. Between the events of Revelation of the Daleks and the season-long story The Trial of a Time Lord, her character was shown to have matured somewhat (coinciding with an 18-month production break between the two stories), and her relationship with the Doctor became less combative.

In the second segment of the Trial story arc, Mindwarp, Peri was abducted by a gastropod-like creature named Kiv, who apparently transplanted his brain into her body. Soon after, the Doctor was led to believe that Peri was dead and was severely distressed by this. It was later revealed, at the end of The Ultimate Foe (the fourth segment of the arc), that the evidence of Peri's death was faked by the Valeyard. In fact, Peri had survived and been saved by – whilst also marrying – King Yrcanos of Thoros Alpha, a warrior king who had assisted the Doctor and Peri in Mindwarp. It is not known what happened to Peri after she married King Yrcanos.

== Production ==
=== Casting ===
English drama student Nicola Bryant had been spotted by an agent in a production of the musical comedy No, No Nanette at her drama school, the Webber Douglas Academy of Dramatic Art, which was the last show she did before leaving the school. She had performed with an American accent during the show, and having mistaken her for a real American, the agent took note of "one American...". In less than a week after leaving the school, he phoned her up and secured her an audition for Doctor Who.

John Nathan-Turner was only auditioning Americans, and the British actress had to feign an American accent during the process. The agent had promised to tell the production that Bryant was British if she was successful, but this was ultimately unfulfilled. Bryant therefore had to use her American accent in all public places, barring the pop to the local supermarket; this included BBC canteens and rehearsal rooms. The young actress simply "got on with it" throughout her entire run on the show and later described it as the "longest role [she] ever played". Bryant described the audition process as "extraordinary" and "surreal".

Bryant revealed her British accent to Colin Baker at a dinner party; after his departure, Baker revealed her non-American origins to the newspapers, which he described as "doing [her] a favour". Decades later, Bryant finds that her American accent can still subconsciously slip into conversation and notes that fans are often still surprised to discover that she is not American.

=== Makeup and costume ===
Announcing the new companion, Nathan-Turner said of Peri, "She'll often be wearing leotards and bikinis. A lot of Dads watch Doctor Who and I'm sure they will like Nicola." Peri's outfit for the first Sixth Doctor serial, The Twin Dilemma, was originally a blue trouser suit; however, Nathan-Turner opposed this as he felt she should wear something more revealing. Despite Nathan-Turner's intentions, some critics felt that Bryant's costumes were too revealing.

Bryant disliked the costume that she wore on Doctor Who. She remembered consistently having her buttocks tapped while walking through the BBC lot and that she would have to laugh and say "thank you" in response and then walk a little faster or duck into the bathroom. She recalled a four- to five-hour makeup process for Mindwarp (1986) being artificially sped up by the makeup department, leading to the prosthetic being ripped from her face; while shooting in the sun the following days, her face was unbearably sore. The skimpy outfit she wore in her first story, Planet of Fire (1984), while appropriate for the Mediterranean weather of its setting, was inappropriate for British winter and caused her to get frostbite and pneumonia.

=== Departure ===
As a consequence of the hiatus, Bryant's three-year contract expired halfway through season 23; Nathan-Turner did not renew her contract, as he did not wish for a companion to be part of the series for longer than previous Doctors. When Bryant's contract was coming to an end, Nathan-Turner asked her how she would like Peri to be written out of the show. She advised that she did not want to shake hands and say a generic line such as "bye Doctor, I'll send you a postcard", and that she wanted a dramatic storyline to "go out with a bang". She was pleased with Philip Martin's "powerful" Mindwarp storyline involving the character's body being taken over by Sil. She was displeased, however, with the retcon at the end of the season, which suggested that Peri had married King Yrcanos (Brian Blessed), as she and Blessed had not played any romantic interaction between the two characters. She feels that the explanation of what happened to Peri in the Big Finish Productions audio story Peri and the Piscon Paradox (2011) was preferable and should be considered canon.

== Characterization ==
As her first job after leaving drama school, Bryant expected to receive a character sheet to give her a window into Peri's backstory. After not receiving one, she opted to write one herself, expecting Nathan-Turner to have it incorporated into the scripts, which he did not do. She initially felt that a companion must either be an adrenaline junkie or someone running from their past, because anyone else would want to leave the Doctor's dangerous adventures. She also noted that in real life, a person finding themselves in the companion's situation would have a nervous breakdown early on. Taking this into consideration, Bryant decided that it was Peri's choice to join the Doctor, that she was so miserable in the life she had on Earth that she wanted to do it, and that she would take on some of the Doctor's strength and courage throughout their adventures.

Similarly to previous companions, Peri's role was often perfunctory in nature, running off and getting in trouble so that the Doctor could save her. For the purpose of enjoying the adventures, the actress was required to "sugarcoat the trauma" of the character nearly dying each episode. To avoid any suggestion of a romantic relationship, Bryant played to the Fifth Doctor as a father figure; she had devised that he was reminiscent of Peri's deceased father, a touch that was never shown on-screen but that Nathan-Turner approved of. Bryant did not like the way that Peri was written in Timelash (1985), as she felt that she bore no resemblance to the character she had started out with and felt it was unnecessary that during her time on the show she spent "three out of four episodes" tied up. Bryant said the story "harked back to the 60s, where basically the companion gets tied up and left somewhere to scream a lot."

== Reception ==
Writing for Digital Spy Ben Rawson-Jones felt that her demise was "the most dramatic and heart-stopping exit by a Doctor Who companion ever."

=== Legacy ===
Bryant's first convention was in November 1983, just a few months after she started shooting, despite having no footage to show. She later described the experience as "a hysteria on par with Beatlemania". She required a bodyguard and stayed in a huge hotel suite. A man fainted after noticing her. At a later convention, she recalled a disabled man giving her a stuffed dog as a gift and describing Peri as his best friend. Bryant would later quasi-reprise her role as Peri in the form of 'Miss Brown' in the BBV video series The Stranger, which co-starred Colin Baker as the titular Doctor-inspired role. She has also acknowledged that the bluntness of Peri's death upset many fans of the show.

During a convention in 2017, Bryant discussed the positive impact that her time on Doctor Who has had on her life: she has been able to travel the world and make close friendships because of the show and expressed that she never expected it to become such a huge part of her life. She stated that there is not one of her stories that she would not wish to reshoot, noting her respect for The Caves of Androzani (1984) as a whole piece and believed the themes in Vengeance on Varos (1985) were still relevant. She also explained that the backstory of later companion Rose Tyler, the first companion of the revived series which began in 2005, was very reminiscent of the backstory she had constructed for Peri.

Peri Lomax, a fictional character from the Channel 4 soap opera Hollyoaks, played by Ruby O'Donnell, was named after Peri. Lomax is one of several Hollyoaks characters to be named after Doctor Who companions.

== Other appearances ==
Peri has the distinction of being the first humanoid television companion to appear in the comic strip within Doctor Who Magazine; previously the strip, which began in 1979, depicted the Doctor either travelling alone or with companions created for the strip, while the robotic television companion K9 was featured in several DWM comic strips featuring the Fourth Doctor). Her first appearance was in "Funhouse Part 1" (DWM #102), in which she appeared in two panels as a scantily clad apparition manifested by a villain. Two issues later, in "Kane's Story Part 1" (DWM #104), she became a regular character in the strip, initially travelling with both the Sixth Doctor and his shape-shifting companion, Frobisher, and continuing until the final part of "Up Above the Gods" in DWM #129. "Kane's Story" established that, at one point during her travels with the Sixth Doctor, Peri left the TARDIS for reasons left unrevealed and went to live in New York City, where she took a job in an office, a job she angrily quit for reasons also unrevealed just prior to encountering the Doctor again and voluntarily rejoining him.

The epilogue to the Target Books novelisation of Mindwarp, written by Philip Martin, stated that Peri returned to the 20th century with King Yrcanos, where the latter became a professional wrestler. This tongue-in-cheek conclusion was not reflected in any televised story and is generally ignored by the fandom.

In the Marvel Comics graphic novel The Age of Chaos, written by Colin Baker, Peri lived out her life on Krontep as Queen Consort of Yrcanos and has at least three grandchildren, who are principal characters in the story.

The Virgin New Adventures novel Bad Therapy by Matthew Jones reveals that, although becoming the wife of King Yrcanos, Peri blamed the Doctor for abandoning her. In the novel, the Seventh Doctor made peace with Peri after she found her way back to Earth through a temporal rift on Krontep and returned her to her time.

The Telos novella Shell Shock by Simon A. Forward reveals that Peri had been sexually abused by her stepfather. This is hinted at in the Past Doctor Adventures novel Synthespians™ by Craig Hinton, which also reveals that her parents were Janine and Paul Brown and that her father died in a boating accident when she was thirteen. She has two step-siblings from her mother's marriage to Foster.

Bryant has voiced Peri in several audio plays produced by Big Finish Productions, alongside both Peter Davison as the Fifth Doctor and Colin Baker as the Sixth Doctor. In several of these stories, the Fifth Doctor and Peri are joined by another companion, the Egyptian princess Erimem. The Sixth Doctor audio play The Reaping introduces Peri's mother, Janine Foster, played by American actress Claudia Christian (although in reality, Christian is five years younger than Nicola Bryant). The play, set in 1984 as the Doctor takes Peri back to her time to attend the funeral of the father of a friend of hers, confirms Peri's late father's name as Paul and mentions that Howard and Janine Foster have gone their separate ways but does not mention Peri's step-siblings. After the Doctor and Peri thwart a Cyberman attempt to set up a conversion factory in Baltimore, Peri plans to stay with her family, but Janine is subsequently killed due to an accident involving remaining Cyber-technology, cutting Peri's last familial tie to Earth and prompting her to return to her travels with the Doctor when he comes to visit her at her mother's grave.

In the audio play Her Final Flight, the Sixth Doctor finds Peri on a remote planet, where she apparently dies of a virus, although it is revealed that the entire story was part of a fantasy designed to make the Doctor kill himself.

Another audio play, Peri and the Piscon Paradox, states that the Time Lords made several adjustments to her timeline, resulting in at least five alternate versions of Peri with different fates, including one that thought she never travelled in the TARDIS but instead moved to California and eventually hosted a chat show called The Queen of Worries after divorcing her abusive childhood sweetheart.

In the later audio The Widow's Assassin, the Doctor travels to Krontep to attend Peri's wedding, only to be locked up for abandoning her. However, despite apparently spending five years in prison, the Doctor actually spends that time carrying out a complex long-term investigation into the death of King Yrcanos shortly after the wedding, eventually learning that 'Peri' is actually possessed by the Doctor's childhood imaginary enemy, Mandrake the Lizard King, who was 'extracted' from the Doctor's mind when he was exposed to Crozier's equipment. After transferring himself into Peri's body to expel Mandrake, the Doctor and Peri return to their true bodies and resume their travels together. In Masters of Earth, they arrive on Earth during the Dalek occupation, a year before the events of The Dalek Invasion of Earth from Earth's perspective, forcing the Doctor to help a future famous rebel figure escape without compromising history. In The Rani Elite, the Doctor and Peri visit a famous university and are nearly caught in a trap set by a version of The Rani who has already experienced the events of Time and the Rani; the crisis ends with Peri receiving an honorary degree in botany to accompany the Doctor's honorary degree in moral philosophy.

Future showrunner Steven Moffat mentions an unnamed 'Warrior Queen on Thoros Beta' in his 1996 short story, "Continuity Errors".

Bryant played the role of 'Miss Brown' in the first three instalments of the BBV video series The Stranger, opposite Colin Baker in the title role; although her character was never explicitly identified as being Peri (much as The Stranger was never directly linked to the Doctor), there are nonetheless similarities in the two characters, with one major difference: Bryant used her natural English accent for Miss Brown, rather than affecting an American accent as she did with Peri.

== Bibliography ==
- Ainsworth, John (2015). "Doctor Who – The Complete History: The Twin Dilemma, Attack of the Cybermen, and Vengeance on Varos". Doctor Who – The Complete History. Vol. 40. Panini Comics.
- Fountain, Nev (September 2009). "Outside the TARDIS Nicola Bryant". Doctor Who Magazine. No. 412. Panini Comics.
- Smith, Kenny (September 2009). "The Worlds of Doctor Who: Join Jago & Litefoot, Counter-Measures, Unit Gallifrey and the Doctor to Celebrate Fifteen Years of Adventures!". Vortex. No. 68. Big Finish Productions.
