= Michael Jayston =

English actor (1935–2024)

- Born: Michael Aubrey James; 29 October 1935; Nottingham, England
- Died: 5 February 2024 (aged 88); Hove, England
- Education: Guildhall School of Music and Drama
- Occupation: Actor
- Years active: 1962–2024
- Notable work: Nicholas and Alexandra (1971); Tinker Tailor Soldier Spy (1979); Doctor Who (1986); Only Fools and Horses (1996)
- Spouses: Lynn Farleigh (m. 1965; div. 1970); Heather Sneddon (m. 1970; div. 1977); Ann Smithson (m. 1979)
- Children: 5

Michael Aubrey James (29 October 1935 – 5 February 2024), known professionally as Michael Jayston, was an English actor and voiceover artist. He was best known for his numerous television appearances, which included portraying Peter Guillam in the miniseries Tinker Tailor Soldier Spy (1979), playing the Valeyard in all 14 episodes of the Doctor Who serial The Trial of a Time Lord (1986). He was nominated for the BAFTA TV Award for Best Actor in 1971.

Jayston also portrayed Nicholas II of Russia in the epic historical film Nicholas and Alexandra (1971). On stage, he was known for his work with the Royal Shakespeare Company and starring roles in West End productions like Noël Coward's Private Lives and Easy Virtue, The Homecoming, Equus, The Sound of Music, Woman in Mind, and Dancing at Lughnasa. He was also a prolific reader of audiobooks, most notably of John le Carré's novels and as James Bond in a BBC Radio 4 adaptation of You Only Live Twice.

== Early life and education ==
Jayston was born on 29 October 1935 in West Bridgford, Nottingham as Michael A. James, the only son of Aubrey Vincent James (died 1937) and Edna Myfanwy Medcalfe (died 1950). His father died of pneumonia when Michael was one, and his mother died when he was a young teenager. Jayston was then raised by his grandmother and an uncle. He attended the Becket RC School on Wilford Lane, West Bridgford. Formerly an accountant, he trained in acting at the Guildhall School of Music and Drama.

== Career ==
=== Stage ===
Jayston began his stage career in 1962, performed at the Bristol Old Vic, and joined the Royal Shakespeare Company at Stratford-upon-Avon in 1965. He starred as Captain von Trapp in the 1981 stage revival of The Sound of Music at the Apollo Victoria in London's West End, alongside Petula Clark as Maria. In 1984, Jayston starred as Mirabell in a production of William Congreve's The Way of the World at the Haymarket Theatre opposite Maggie Smith and Joan Plowright.

=== Television ===
Jayston played Shakespearean roles on TV including Macbeth in Macbeth (1970), Gratiano in The Merchant of Venice (1973) and Edmund in King Lear (1975). An early recurring television role of his was as civil servant Dowling in the final series of boardroom drama The Power Game in 1969.

In 1972, Jayston played Sir Henry Royce alongside Robert Powell in the episode "Mr. Rolls and Mr. Royce" of the BBC drama series The Edwardians; the following year he took the role of Mr Rochester in a BBC adaptation of Jane Eyre, opposite Sorcha Cusack.

Jayston made two appearances in the anthology series Thriller in 1974, and in 1975 played Quiller, a spy who never used a gun, in the short-lived British TV series of the same name. He appeared as Dornford Yates' gentleman hero Jonathan Mansel in the 1978 BBC adaptation of She Fell Among Thieves. In 1979, he played Peter Guillam opposite Alec Guinness in the series Tinker Tailor Soldier Spy. In 1981, he played the murderer Frederick Seddon in the Granada Television series Lady Killers. In 1983, he appeared, along with Sue Cook, in Arthur Marshall's team on Call My Bluff (Series 18 Episode 11) on 4 July 1983.

Jayston played Neville Badger in the 1989 television adaptation of David Nobbs's comedy of manners A Bit of a Do. In 1991, he appeared as Colonel Mustard in the television series Cluedo, and a year later made a guest appearance in the Press Gang episode "UnXpected". Other TV appearances include in EastEnders, Coronation Street, Only Fools and Horses, The Darling Buds of May, Tales of the Unexpected, The Bill and the character of Donald De Souza in Emmerdale. He appeared in Foyle's War, Holby City, Sherlock Holmes, Tracy Beaker Returns, and Midsomer Murders.

==== Doctor Who ====
In 1986, Jayston played the role of the Valeyard in the long-running British science fiction television series Doctor Who. In the serial's conclusion, the Valeyard is revealed to be a manifestation of the Doctor's dark side. He later reprised the part of the Valeyard in the Big Finish Productions audio plays He Jests at Scars..., Trial of the Valeyard, The Sixth Doctor: The Last Adventure, and The Eighth Doctor: The Time War 3.

=== Film ===
In 1968 Jayston played Demetrius in Peter Hall's A Midsummer Night's Dream. Two years later in 1970, he played Henry Ireton in Cromwell. The following year he starred as Tsar Nicholas II of Russia in the film Nicholas and Alexandra.

Jayston appeared as Gratiano opposite Laurence Olivier as Shylock in the National Theatre's film The Merchant of Venice (1974).

=== Audio ===
Jayston recorded most of John le Carré's novels in audiobook format, providing a link with his role as Peter Guillam in the 1979 TV series Tinker Tailor Soldier Spy. He was also the storyteller in the BBC radio readings of the novels Rogue Male and Rogue Justice, both written by Geoffrey Household.

In 1990, he played the role of Ian Fleming's James Bond in a BBC Radio 4 adaptation of You Only Live Twice.

As an official United Kingdom Record Store Day 2017 release, a collaborative double vinyl album between the underground artist Ruben Vine and Jayston, including a 28-page comic, was released. Jayston featured as the narrator on the story-based album entitled The Life & Times of an Imaginary Rock Star.

A prolific reader for audiobooks, Jayston also recorded audio versions of many of the novels of Alexander Kent - the Richard Bolitho adventures set during the age of sail before and throughout the Napoleonic Wars, Winston Churchill's history of the Second World War, and many others. In the 1970s and 1980s he also provided voiceovers for many TV adverts in the UK.

== Personal life ==
Jayston was married three times: to Lynn Farleigh in 1965 and, after his first divorce, to Heather Sneddon in 1970. He remarried in 1979 to Ann Smithson. He had three children with Sneddon and two children with Smithson.

=== Death ===
Jayston lived in Hove in East Sussex. He died on 5 February 2024, at the age of 88, following a short illness.

== Select filmography ==
=== Film ===
Year	Title	Role	Notes	Ref.
1970	Cromwell	Henry Ireton		
1971	Nicholas and Alexandra	Tsar Nicholas II of Russia		
1972	Follow Me!	Charles		
1972	Alice's Adventures in Wonderland	Charles Dodgson		
1973	Bequest to the Nation	Capt. Hardy		
1973	The Homecoming	Teddy		
1973	Tales That Witness Madness	Brian	Segment: "Mel"	
1974	Craze	Detective Sgt. Wall		
1974	The Internecine Project	David Baker		
1978	Dominique	Arnold Craven		
1979	Zulu Dawn	Henry Hope Crealock		
1981	From a Far Country	Narrator		
1994	Highlander III: The Final Dimension	Jack Donovan		

=== Television ===
Year	Title	Role	Notes	Ref.
1968	A Midsummer Night's Dream	Demetrius		
1969	The Power Game	Dowling		
1970	Mad Jack	Siegfried Sassoon		
1970	'The Hero of My Life'	Charles Dickens		
1972	The Edwardians	Henry Royce		
1973	The Merchant of Venice	Gratiano		
1973	Jane Eyre	Mr Rochester		
1974	Thriller	Mark Walker	"Ring Once for Death" - Roger Masters; "A Coffin for the Bride"	
1975	Quiller	Quiller		
1975	King Lear	Edmund		
1977	She Fell Among Thieves	Jonathan Mansell		
1979	Tinker Tailor Soldier Spy	Peter Guillam		
1981	Lady Killers	Frederick Seddon	1 episode: Root of All Evil	
1984	Tales of the Unexpected	G.B.Shaw	"The Best Chess Player in the World"	
1986	Doctor Who	The Valeyard	"The Trial of a Time Lord"	
1989	A Bit of a Do	Neville Badger	13 episodes	
1991	Cluedo	Colonel Mike Mustard		
1991	The Disappeance of Lady Carfax	Earl of Rufton	"The Case-Book of Sherlock Holmes (Granada Television)	
1992	Press Gang	Colonel X	1 episode: "UnXpected"	
1992	The Darling Buds of May	Ernst Bristow	4 episodes	
1995–1996	Outside Edge	Bob Willis		
1996	Only Fools and Horses	James Turner	1 episode: Time on Our Hands	
2007–2008	Foyle's War	A. C. Henry Parkins	2 episodes: "Casualties of War", "Plan of Attack"	
2007–2008	Emmerdale	Donald De Souza		
2010	Tracy Beaker Returns	Mr Spooner		
2014	Midsomer Murders	Reverend Arthur Gould		
