= Doctor Who: The 50th Anniversary Collection =

2013 soundtrack album

- Cover of the eleven disc release

Soundtrack album
- Released: 9 December 2013 (4 disc); 4 February 2014 (2 disc); 29 September 2014 (11 disc); 25 February 2016 (vinyl)
- Recorded: 1962–2013
- Genre: Soundtrack
- Length: 5:15:31 (4 disc); 2:37:19 (2 disc); 14:06:50 (11 disc); 2:09:51 (vinyl)
- Label: Silva Screen Records
- Producer: Mark Ayres

Doctor Who soundtrack chronology
The Snowmen / The Doctor, the Widow and the Wardrobe (2013)	Doctor Who: The 50th Anniversary Collection (2013)	Cold Worlds (2014)

Cover of the four disc release

Doctor Who: The 50th Anniversary Collection is a collection of music compiled by Mark Ayres from the first fifty years of Doctor Who that has been released in varying forms by Silva Screen Records.

== Releases ==
=== Four disc version ===
The first release of the music was in a four disc edition which was released on 9 December 2013. The track listing was released on 15 November 2013.

=== Two disc version ===
A condensed two disc release was prepared for the United States market, with a digital release on 17 December 2013 and a CD release on 4 February 2014. The cover for this US release is the same as the four disc version, but with a blue tint.

=== Eleven disc version ===
An expanded, eleven disc set was available for preorder in both a limited edition TARDIS packaging and in a standard clamshell packaging from 25 April 2014. The pre-order for the TARDIS packaging version ended on 9 May 2014, and the pre-order for the clamshell packaging version ended on 16 May 2014. Both eleven disc versions were scheduled for release 25 July 2014. However, in an email sent 14 July 2014 to customers who had ordered them, Silva Screen stated that production delays meant that the revised delivery date would likely be the end of November. Then in an email sent 15 July, it was announced that the standard clamshell eleven disc set would be released 15 September 2014, with the TARDIS set still expected at the end of November. However, an email sent 5 September announced that a printing error necessitated a reprinting of the clamshell release, with the release date being pushed back to 29 September.

=== Vinyl version ===
A 50-track, 4 LP vinyl edition was released on 25 February 2016 in a limited number of 1,000 editions.

== Track listings ==
=== Four disc version ===
Disc 1
No.	Title	Writer(s)	Serial/Episode	Length
1.	"Doctor Who (Original Theme)"	Delia Derbyshire (Note: Worked as part of the BBC Radiophonic Workshop)	various
2.	"Three Guitars Mood 2"	The Arthur Nelson Group	An Unearthly Child
3.	"TARDIS Takeoff"	Brian Hodgson	An Unearthly Child
4.	"Forest Atmosphere"	Tristram Cary	The Daleks
5.	"Forest With Creature"	Tristram Cary	The Daleks
6.	"City Music 1 and 2"	Tristram Cary	The Daleks
7.	"The Daleks"	Tristram Cary	The Daleks
8.	"Dalek Control Room"	Brian Hodgson	The Daleks
9.	"The Ambush"	Tristram Cary	The Daleks
10.	"Capsule Oscillation (Dalek Destructor Fuse / Bomb Countdown)"	Brian Hodgson	The Daleks
11.	"Explosion, TARDIS Stops"	Brian Hodgson	The Edge of Destruction
12.	"Sleeping Machine"	Brian Hodgson	The Keys of Marinus
13.	"Dalek Spaceship Lands"	Brian Hodgson	The Chase
14.	"TARDIS Lands"	Brian Hodgson	The Chase
15.	"Chumbley (Constant Run)"	Brian Hodgson	Galaxy 4
16.	"Chumbley at Rest"	Brian Hodgson	Galaxy 4
17.	"Marche"	Les Structures Sonores	Galaxy 4
18.	"A Strange Sickness"	Tristram Cary	The Daleks' Master Plan
19.	"Growing Menace"	Tristram Cary	The Daleks' Master Plan
20.	"The Ballad of the Last Chance Saloon"	Lynda Baron & Tom McCall	The Gunfighters
21.	"Space Adventure, Pt. 2"	Martin Slavin	The Tenth Planet
22.	"Heartbeat Chase"	Brian Hodgson	The Macra Terror
23.	"Chromophone Band"	Dudley Simpson, realised by Delia Derbyshire	The Macra Terror
24.	"Propaganda Sleep Machine"	Brian Hodgson	The Macra Terror
25.	"Sidereal Universe"	Paul Bonneau and his Orchestra	The Tomb of the Cybermen
26.	"Space Time Music, Pt. 1"	Westway Studio Orchestra	The Tomb of the Cybermen
27.	"Space Time Music, Pt. 2"	Westway Studio Orchestra	The Web of Fear
28.	"Mr. Oak and Mr. Quill (Incidental Music)"	Dudley Simpson, realised Brian Hodgson	Fury from the Deep
29.	"Cyberman Stab & Music"	Brian Hodgson	The Wheel in Space
30.	"Birth of Cybermats"	Brian Hodgson	The Wheel in Space
31.	"Interior Rocket (Suspense Music)"	Brian Hodgson	The Wheel in Space
32.	"Galaxy Atmosphere"	Brian Hodgson	The Dominators
33.	"Zoe's Theme"	Brian Hodgson	The Mind Robber
34.	"The Dark Side of the Moon"	Don Harper	The Invasion
35.	"The Company"	Don Harper	The Invasion
36.	"Machine and City Theme"	Brian Hodgson	The Krotons
37.	"Kroton Theme"	Brian Hodgson	The Krotons
38.	"The Seeds of Death Titles"	Dudley Simpson, John Blanchard, and Eric Allen	The Seeds of Death
39.	"Ice Warriors Music"	Dudley Simpson, John Blanchard, and Eric Allen	The Seeds of Death
40.	"Time Lord Court"	Brian Hodgson	The War Games
41.	"Doctor Who (New Opening, 1967 – full version)"	Delia Derbyshire	various
42.	"The Master's Theme"	Dudley Simpson, realised by Brian Hodgson	The Mind of Evil
43.	"Hypnosis Music"	Dudley Simpson, realised by Brian Hodgson	The Mind of Evil
44.	"Dover Castle"	Dudley Simpson, realised by Brian Hodgson	The Mind of Evil
45.	"Keller Machine Appears and Vanishes"	Brian Hodgson	The Mind of Evil
46.	"Keller Machine Theme"	Dudley Simpson, realised by Brian Hodgson	The Mind of Evil
47.	"Copy Machine Tickover"	Brian Hodgson	The Claws of Axos
48.	"The Axons Approach"	Brian Hodgson	The Claws of Axos
49.	"The Sea Devils"	Malcolm Clarke	The Sea Devils
50.	"The Mutants"	Tristram Cary	The Mutants
51.	"Frontier in Space, Episode 1"	Dudley Simpson	Frontier in Space
52.	"Death to the Daleks"	London Saxophone Quartet	Death to the Daleks
53.	"Metebelis III Atmosphere"	Dick Mills	Planet of the Spiders

Disc 2
No.	Title	Writer(s)	Serial/Episode	Length
1.	"Doctor Who Opening Title Theme"	Delia Derbyshire	various
2.	"Nerva Beacon Infrastructure and T-Mat Couch"	Dick Mills	The Ark in Space
3.	"Revenge of the Cybermen"	Carey Blyton and Orchestra	Revenge of the Cybermen
4.	"The Destruction of Charlie Rig"	Geoffrey Burgon	Terror of the Zygons
5.	"A Landing in Scotland"	Geoffrey Burgon	Terror of the Zygons
6.	"The Zygons Attack"	Geoffrey Burgon	Terror of the Zygons
7.	"The Android Invasion, Episodes 3 and 4"	Dudley Simpson	The Android Invasion
8.	"The Planet Karn"	Dick Mills	The Brain of Morbius
9.	"Antarctica – The First Pod"	Geoffrey Burgon and Orchestra	The Seeds of Doom
10.	"Get Dunbar! / Krynoid On The Loose"	Geoffrey Burgon and Orchestra	The Seeds of Doom
11.	"The Mandragora Helix"	Dick Mills	The Masque of Mandragora
12.	"The Invasion of Time, Episodes 3 and 4"	Dudley Simpson	The Invasion of Time
13.	"Doctor Who Closing Titles (40" Version)"	Delia Derbyshire	various
14.	"Doctor Who 1980 (Opening Titles)"	Peter Howell	various
15.	"Into Argolis"	Peter Howell	The Leisure Hive
16.	"K9 on a Mission"	Paddy Kingsland	Full Circle
17.	"Nyssa's Theme"	Roger Limb	The Keeper of Traken
18.	"It's The End…"	Paddy Kingsland	Logopolis
19.	"Doctor Who 1980 (Closing Titles)"	Peter Howell	Various
20.	"Castrovalva Suite"	Paddy Kingsland	Castrovalva
21.	"Exploring the Lab"	Roger Limb	Four to Doomsday
22.	"March Of The Cybermen"	Malcolm Clarke	Earthshock
23.	"Mawdryn Undead Suite"	Paddy Kingsland	Mawdryn Undead
24.	"The Five Doctors Suite"	Peter Howell	"The Five Doctors"
25.	"Warriors of the Deep Suite"	Jonathan Gibbs	Warriors of the Deep
26.	"Resurrection of the Daleks"	Malcolm Clarke	Resurrection of the Daleks
27.	"The Caves of Androzani (Alternative Suite)"	Roger Limb	The Caves of Androzani
28.	"Doctor Who Theme (1980 – Full Version)"	Peter Howell	various

Disc 3
No.	Title	Writer(s)	Serial/Episode	Length
1.	"The Twin Dilemma Suite"	Malcolm Clarke	The Twin Dilemma
2.	"The Mark of the Rani Suite"	Jonathan Gibbs	The Mark of the Rani
3.	"The Two Doctors Suite"	Peter Howell	The Two Doctors
4.	"Timelash Suite"	Elizabeth Parker	Timelash
5.	"Revelation of the Daleks Suite"	Roger Limb	Revelation of the Daleks
6.	"Doctor Who 1986"	Dominic Glynn	various
7.	"The Mysterious Planet"	Dominic Glynn	The Trial of a Time Lord: The Mysterious Planet
8.	"Terror of the Vervoids"	Malcolm Clarke	The Trial of a Time Lord: Terror of the Vervoids
9.	"The Ultimate Foe"	Dominic Glynn	The Trial of a Time Lord: The Ultimate Foe
10.	"Doctor Who 1987"	Keff McCulloch	Various
11.	"Time and the Rani Suite"	Keff McCulloch	Time and the Rani
12.	"Here's to the Future"	Keff McCulloch featuring The Lorells	Delta and the Bannermen
13.	"Dragonfire Suite"	Dominic Glynn	Dragonfire
14.	"Remembrance of the Daleks Suite"	Keff McCulloch	Remembrance of the Daleks
15.	"The Greatest Show in the Galaxy Suite"	Mark Ayres	The Greatest Show in the Galaxy
16.	"Battlefield Suite"	Keff McCulloch	Battlefield
17.	"The Curse of Fenric Suite"	Mark Ayres	The Curse of Fenric
18.	"Survival Suite"	Dominic Glynn	Survival
19.	"…and somewhere else, the tea's getting cold"	Dominic Glynn	Survival
20.	"Prologue: Skaro / Doctor Who Theme"	John Debney	Doctor Who
21.	"Who Am I?"	John Debney	Doctor Who
22.	"The Chase (Original Version)"	John Debney	Doctor Who
23.	"Open the Eye"	John Debney	Doctor Who
24.	"Farewell"	John Debney	Doctor Who
25.	"End Credits / Doctor Who Theme"	John Debney	Doctor Who

Disc 4
No.	Title	Writer(s)	Serial/Episode	Length
1.	"Doctor Who Theme – TV Version"	Murray Gold	various
2.	"Rose's Theme"	Murray Gold	"The End of the World"
3.	"Doomsday"	Murray Gold	"Doomsday"
4.	"Donna's Theme"	Murray Gold	"The Runaway Bride"
5.	"The Doctor Forever"	Murray Gold	"The Runaway Bride"
6.	"Martha's Theme"	Murray Gold	"Smith and Jones"
7.	"All the Strange, Strange Creatures"	Murray Gold	"Gridlock"
8.	"Boe"	Murray Gold	"Gridlock"
9.	"This is Gallifrey: Our Childhood, Our Home"	Murray Gold	"The Sound of Drums" / "Last of the Time Lords"
10.	"Song Of Freedom"	Murray Gold	"The Stolen Earth" / "Journey's End"
11.	"The Master Suite"	Murray Gold	"The End of Time"
12.	"Four Knocks"	Murray Gold	"The End of Time"
13.	"Vale Decem"	Murray Gold	"The End of Time"
14.	"I Am the Doctor"	Murray Gold	"The Eleventh Hour"
15.	"The Mad Man with a Box"	Murray Gold	"The Eleventh Hour"
16.	"Amy's Theme"	Murray Gold	"The Beast Below"
17.	"Abigail's Song (Silence Is All You Know) (Vocal - Katherine Jenkins)"	Murray Gold	"A Christmas Carol"
18.	"Melody Pond"	Murray Gold	"A Good Man Goes to War"
19.	"The Wedding of River Song"	Murray Gold	"The Wedding of River Song"
20.	"Towards the Asylum"	Murray Gold	"Asylum of the Daleks"
21.	"Together or Not at All – The Song of Amy and Rory"	Murray Gold	"The Angels Take Manhattan"
22.	"Up The Shard"	Murray Gold	"The Bells of Saint John"
23.	"The Long Song"	Murray Gold	"The Rings of Akhaten"

=== Two disc version ===
Disc 1
No.	Title	Writer(s)	Serial/Episode	Length
1.	"Doctor Who (Original Theme)"	Ron Grainer & Delia Derbyshire	various
2.	"Three Guitars Mood 2"	Derek Nelson & Arthur Raymond	An Unearthly Child
3.	"TARDIS Takeoff"	Brian Hodgson	An Unearthly Child
4.	"The Daleks"	Tristram Cary	The Daleks
5.	"Space Adventure, Pt. 2"	Martin Slavin	The Tenth Planet
6.	"Chromophone Band"	Dudley Simpson	The Macra Terror
7.	"Mr. Oak and Mr. Quill (Incidental Music)"	Dudley Simpson	Fury from the Deep
8.	"Zoe's Theme"	Brian Hodgson	The Mind Robber
9.	"The Company"	Don Harper	The Invasion
10.	"The Sea Devils"	Malcolm Clarke	The Sea Devils
11.	"The Mutants"	Tristram Cary	The Mutants
12.	"Revenge of the Cybermen"	Carey Blyton	Revenge of the Cybermen
13.	"Terror of the Zygons Suite"	Geoffrey Burgon	Terror of the Zygons
14.	"The Invasion of Time, Episodes 3 and 4"	Dudley Simpson	The Invasion of Time
15.	"It's The End..."	Paddy Kingsland	Logopolis
16.	"Doctor Who 1980 (Full Version)"	Ron Grainer	various
17.	"Castrovalva Suite"	Paddy Kingsland	Castrovalva
18.	"March Of The Cybermen"	Malcolm Clarke	Earthshock
19.	"The Five Doctors Suite"	Peter Howell	"The Five Doctors"
20.	"The Mark of the Rani Suite"	Jonathan Gibbs	The Mark of the Rani
21.	"Timelash Suite"	Elizabeth Parker	Timelash
22.	"Revelation of the Daleks Suite"	Roger Limb	Revelation of the Daleks
23.	"Doctor Who 1986"	Ron Grainer	various

Disc 2
No.	Title	Writer(s)	Serial/Episode	Length
1.	"The Trial of a Time Lord Suite"	Dominic Glynn	The Trial of a Time Lord
2.	"Doctor Who 1987"	Ron Grainer	various
3.	"Time and the Rani Suite"	Keff McCulloch	Time and the Rani
4.	"Here's to the Future"	Keff McCulloch	Delta and the Bannermen
5.	"Dragonfire Suite"	Dominic Glynn	Dragonfire
6.	"Remembrance of the Daleks Suite"	Keff McCulloch	Remembrance of the Daleks
7.	"The Greatest Show in the Galaxy Suite"	Mark Ayres	The Greatest Show in the Galaxy
8.	"The Curse of Fenric Suite"	Mark Ayres	The Curse of Fenric
9.	"Survival"	Dominic Glynn	Survival
10.	"Back To The Tardis (Version 2)"	Mark Ayres	More Than 30 Years in the TARDIS
11.	"Doctor Who: The Television Movie Suite"	John Debney	Doctor Who: The Television Movie
12.	"Doctor Who Theme – TV Version"	Ron Grainer & Murray Gold	various
13.	"Rose's Theme"	Murray Gold	"The End of the World"
14.	"Doomsday"	Murray Gold	"Doomsday"
15.	"The Doctor Forever"	Murray Gold	"The Runaway Bride"
16.	"All the Strange, Strange Creatures"	Murray Gold	"Gridlock"
17.	"This Is Gallifrey: Our Childhood, Our Home"	Murray Gold	"The Sound of Drums" / "Last of the Time Lords"
18.	"Vale Decem"	Murray Gold	"The End of Time"
19.	"I Am the Doctor"	Murray Gold	"The Eleventh Hour"
20.	"Amy's Theme"	Murray Gold	"The Beast Below"
21.	"The Long Song"	Murray Gold	"The Rings of Akhaten"
22.	"Infinite Potential"	Murray Gold	"The Rings of Akhaten"

=== Eleven disc version ===
Disc 1 (First Doctor)
No.	Title	Writer(s)	Serial/Episode	Length
1.	"Doctor Who (Original Theme)"	Delia Derbyshire	various
2.	"Doctor Who (Pilot Theme)"	Delia Derbyshire	"An Unearthly Child" - Unaired Pilot Version
3.	"TARDIS Exterior Hum and Door (Original)"	Brian Hodgson	"An Unearthly Child" - Unaired Pilot Version
4.	"Entry Into the TARDIS (Full length version)"	Brian Hodgson	"An Unearthly Child" - Unaired Pilot Version
5.	"TARDIS Original Takeoff Sequence"	Brian Hodgson	"An Unearthly Child" - Unaired Pilot Version
6.	"Doctor Who (Original Titles Music)"	Delia Derbyshire	various
7.	"Three Guitars Mood 2"	The Arthur Nelson Group	An Unearthly Child
8.	"TARDIS Takeoff"	Brian Hodgson	An Unearthly Child
9.	"Forest Atmosphere"	Tristram Cary	The Daleks
10.	"Skaro - Petrified Forest Atmosphere ("Thal Wind")"	Tristram Cary	The Daleks
11.	"TARDIS Computer"	Tristram Cary	The Daleks
12.	"Forest With Creature"	Tristram Cary	The Daleks
13.	"City Music 1 and 2"	Tristram Cary	The Daleks
14.	"Dalek City Corridor"	Tristram Cary	The Daleks
15.	"The Daleks"	Tristram Cary	The Daleks
16.	"Dalek Control Room"	Brian Hodgson	The Daleks
17.	"The Storm Continued (Susan Meets Alydon)"	Tristram Cary	The Daleks
18.	"The Fight"	Tristram Cary	The Daleks
19.	"The Ambush"	Tristram Cary	The Daleks
20.	"Rising Tension"	Tristram Cary	The Daleks
21.	"Demented Dalek"	Tristram Cary	The Daleks
22.	"Capsule Oscillation (Dalek Destructor Fuse / Bomb Countdown)"	Brian Hodgson	The Daleks
23.	"Explosion, TARDIS Stops"	Brian Hodgson	The Edge of Destruction
24.	"Sleeping Machine"	Brian Hodgson	The Keys of Marinus
25.	"Sensorite Speech Background"	Brian Hodgson	The Sensorites
26.	"The Chase (Music and Effects from the Soundtrack)"	Dudley Simpson and Brian Hodgson	The Chase
27.	"Dalek Spaceship Lands"	Brian Hodgson	The Chase
28.	"Dalek Tracking Device"	Brian Hodgson	The Chase
29.	"Dalek Spaceship Takeoff"	Brian Hodgson	The Chase
30.	"TARDIS Lands"	Brian Hodgson	The Chase
31.	"Chumbley (Constant Run)"	Brian Hodgson	Galaxy 4
32.	"Chumbley at Rest"	Brian Hodgson	Galaxy 4
33.	"Marche"	Les Structures Sonores	Galaxy 4
34.	"Chumbley Sends Message"	Brian Hodgson	Galaxy 4
35.	"Chumbley Dome (Rises / Falls / Rises / Falls)"	Brian Hodgson	Galaxy 4
36.	"Chumbley Dies"	Brian Hodgson	Galaxy 4
37.	"A Strange Sickness"	Tristram Cary	The Daleks' Master Plan
38.	"Kembel I"	Tristram Cary	The Daleks' Master Plan
39.	"Daleks I"	Tristram Cary	The Daleks' Master Plan
40.	"Activity on Dalek Ship Control Panel"	Brian Hodgson	The Daleks' Master Plan
41.	"Daleks at the TARDIS"	Tristram Cary	The Daleks' Master Plan
42.	"Wall of Fire"	Tristram Cary	The Daleks' Master Plan
43.	"At the City Walls"	Tristram Cary	The Daleks' Master Plan
44.	"Leaving Kembel"	Tristram Cary	The Daleks' Master Plan
45.	"The Experiment"	Tristram Cary	The Daleks' Master Plan
46.	"Invisible Creatures"	Tristram Cary	The Daleks' Master Plan
47.	"Dalek Time Machine"	Tristram Cary	The Daleks' Master Plan
48.	"The Missing TARDIS"	Tristram Cary	The Daleks' Master Plan
49.	"The Tomb"	Tristram Cary	The Daleks' Master Plan
50.	"The Heart of the Mountain"	Tristram Cary	The Daleks' Master Plan
51.	"Growing Menace"	Tristram Cary	The Daleks' Master Plan
52.	"The Time Destructor"	Tristram Cary	The Daleks' Master Plan
53.	"Excerpts from The Ballad of the Last Chance Saloon"	Tristram Cary	The Gunfighters
54.	"Transfer of Human Energy into Reserve"	Brian Hodgson	The Savages
55.	"Energy Escapes"	Brian Hodgson	The Savages
56.	"Space Adventure Part 2"	Martin Slavin	The Tenth Planet
57.	"Cybership Interior Atmosphere"	Brian Hodgson	The Tenth Planet
58.	"Machinery in TARDIS Goes Wild (Regeneration)"	Brian Hodgson	The Tenth Planet

Disc 2 (Second Doctor)
No.	Title	Writer(s)	Serial/Episode	Length
1.	"Regeneration Runs Down"	Brian Hodgson and Dick Mills	The Power of the Daleks
2.	"The Doctor's Transitional Trauma"	Brian Hodgson and Dick Mills	The Power of the Daleks
3.	"The Fish People"	Dudley Simpson and Brian Hodgson	The Underwater Menace
4.	"Heartbeat Chase"	Brian Hodgson	The Macra Terror
5.	"Chromophone Band"	Dudley Simpson and Delia Derbyshire	The Macra Terror
6.	"Controller Chimes"	Brian Hodgson	The Macra Terror
7.	"Muzak (from "Time in Advance")"	John Baker	The Macra Terror
8.	"Propaganda Sleep Machine"	Brian Hodgson	The Macra Terror
9.	"The Macra Terror (Incidental music excerpt)"	Dudley Simpson	The Macra Terror
10.	"Doctor Who (New Opening, 1967 - full version)"	Delia Derbyshire	various
11.	"Universe Sidereal"	Paul Bonneau and his Orchestra	The Tomb of the Cybermen
12.	"Space Time Music Part 1"	Westway Studio Orchestra	The Tomb of the Cybermen
13.	"Yeti Control Sphere Move, Call and Answer"	Brian Hodgson	The Abominable Snowmen
14.	"The Ice Warriors One: Titles"	Dudley Simpson	The Ice Warriors
15.	"The Ice Warriors Two-Six: Titles"	Dudley Simpson	The Ice Warriors
16.	"Space Time Music Part 2"	Westway Studio Orchestra	The Web of Fear
17.	"Sting & Web (Cocooning Interior / Cobweb Pulsates)"	Brian Hodgson	The Web of Fear
18.	"4 Stings"	Brian Hodgson	The Web of Fear
19.	"Fury from the Deep - Mr Oak and Mr Quill"	Dudley Simpson and Brian Hodgson	Fury from the Deep
20.	"Lead-In to Cyber Planner"	Brian Hodgson	The Wheel in Space
21.	"Cyber Planner Background"	Brian Hodgson	The Wheel in Space
22.	"Cybermen Stab & Music"	Brian Hodgson	The Wheel in Space
23.	"Rocket Stab"	Brian Hodgson	The Wheel in Space
24.	"Birth of Cybermats"	Brian Hodgson	The Wheel in Space
25.	"Cybermats Attracted to Wheel"	Brian Hodgson	The Wheel in Space
26.	"Rocket in Space"	Brian Hodgson	The Wheel in Space
27.	"Interior Rocket (Suspense Music)"	Brian Hodgson	The Wheel in Space
28.	"Servo Robot Music"	Brian Hodgson	The Wheel in Space
29.	"Wheel Stab"	Brian Hodgson	The Wheel in Space
30.	"Cosmos Atmosphere"	Brian Hodgson	The Wheel in Space
31.	"Alien Ship Music"	Brian Hodgson	The Wheel in Space
32.	"Jarvis in a Dream State"	Brian Hodgson	The Wheel in Space
33.	"2 Stabs"	Brian Hodgson	The Wheel in Space
34.	"TARDIS (New Landing)"	Brian Hodgson	The Dominators
35.	"Dominators' Saucer Power On"	Brian Hodgson	The Dominators
36.	"Sting"	Brian Hodgson	The Dominators
37.	"Statues Move (a and b)"	Brian Hodgson	The Dominators
38.	"Galaxy Atmosphere"	Brian Hodgson	The Dominators
39.	"Dominators' Saucer Interior"	Brian Hodgson	The Dominators
40.	"Tension Builder (a)"	Brian Hodgson	The Dominators
41.	"Tension Builder (c)"	Brian Hodgson	The Dominators
42.	"Tension Builder (d)"	Brian Hodgson	The Dominators
43.	"Low Sting"	Brian Hodgson	The Dominators
44.	"TARDIS, Extra Power Unit Plugged In"	Brian Hodgson	The Mind Robber
45.	"Zoe's Theme"	Brian Hodgson	The Mind Robber
46.	"White Void"	Brian Hodgson	The Mind Robber
47.	"The Dark Side of the Moon"	Don Harper	The Invasion
48.	"The Company"	Don Harper	The Invasion
49.	"Muzak (from "Time in Advance")"	John Baker	The Invasion
50.	"Brigadier Lethbridge-Stewart"	Don Harper	The Invasion
51.	"Mysteries"	Don Harper	The Invasion
52.	"Cyberman Brought to Life"	Brian Hodgson	The Invasion
53.	"Cyber Invasion"	Brian Hodgson	The Invasion
54.	"The Learning Hall"	Brian Hodgson	The Krotons
55.	"Entry into the Machine"	Brian Hodgson	The Krotons
56.	"Sting"	Brian Hodgson	The Krotons
57.	"Machine and City Theme"	Brian Hodgson	The Krotons
58.	"Kroton Theme"	Brian Hodgson	The Krotons
59.	"The Seeds of Death: Titles"	Dudley Simpson, John Blanchard, and Eric Allen	The Seeds of Death
60.	"Moon Control"	Dudley Simpson, John Blanchard, and Eric Allen	The Seeds of Death
61.	"Diffraction (Ice Warrior Gun Impact)"	Brian Hodgson	The Seeds of Death
62.	"Ice Warriors Music"	Dudley Simpson, John Blanchard, and Eric Allen	The Seeds of Death
63.	"Moon Homing Beam Call Signal & Reply"	Brian Hodgson	The Seeds of Death
64.	"TARDIS Lands"	Brian Hodgson	The Space Pirates
65.	"Alien Control Centre"	Brian Hodgson	The War Games
66.	"Time Zone Atmosphere"	Brian Hodgson	The War Games
67.	"Dimensional Control (SIDRAT Dimensions Contract)"	Brian Hodgson	The War Games
68.	"War Lord Arrival"	Brian Hodgson	The War Games
69.	"War Chief Music"	Dudley Simpson	The War Games
70.	"Silver Box (The Doctor Calls For Help)"	Brian Hodgson	The War Games
71.	"Time Lord Court"	Brian Hodgson	The War Games

Disc 3 (Third Doctor)
No.	Title	Writer(s)	Serial/Episode	Length
1.	"Doctor Who: Opening Title Theme (1970)"	Delia Derbyshire	various
2.	"TARDIS Tries to Take Off"	Brian Hodgson	Spearhead from Space
3.	"Doctor Who and the Silurians"	Carey Blyton	Doctor Who and the Silurians
4.	"Outer Space"	Brian Hodgson	The Ambassadors of Death
5.	"TARDIS Control On & Warp Transfer"	Brian Hodgson	Inferno
6.	"Blue Veils and Golden Sands"	Delia Derbyshire	Inferno
7.	"The Delian Mode"	Delia Derbyshire	Inferno
8.	"Battle Theme"	St George (Brian Hodgson)	Inferno
9.	"The Master's Theme"	Dudley Simpson	The Mind of Evil
10.	"Hypnosis Music"	Dudley Simpson	The Mind of Evil
11.	"Dover Castle"	Dudley Simpson	The Mind of Evil
12.	"Keller Machine Appears and Vanishes"	Brian Hodgson	The Mind of Evil
13.	"Keller Machine Theme"	Dudley Simpson	The Mind of Evil
14.	"Axos Cell Interior Atmosphere"	Brian Hodgson	The Claws of Axos
15.	"Brain Centre Atmosphere"	Brian Hodgson	The Claws of Axos
16.	"Copy machine tickover"	Brian Hodgson	The Claws of Axos
17.	"The Axons Approach"	Dudley Simpson	The Claws of Axos
18.	"TARDIS Lands"	Brian Hodgson	The Claws of Axos
19.	"TARDIS Interior (Stationary)"	Brian Hodgson	The Curse of Peladon
20.	"TARDIS Interior (In flight)"	Brian Hodgson	The Curse of Peladon
21.	"The Sea Devils"	Malcolm Clarke	The Sea Devils
22.	"Transfer Machine Arrival"	Dick Mills	The Mutants
23.	"The Mutants"	Tristram Cary	The Mutants
24.	"Doctor Who (Stereo Version, 1972)"	Delia Derbyshire	unaired
25.	"Doctor Who (Delaware Version, 1972)"	Delia Derbyshire and Brian Hodgson with Paddy Kingsland	unaired
26.	"Time Lords Background"	Dick Mills	The Three Doctors
27.	"Carnival of Monsters Episode 1"	Dudley Simpson	Carnival of Monsters
28.	"Frontier in Space - Hyperspace Jump"	Dick Mills	Frontier in Space
29.	"Frontier in Space Episodes 1 and 2"	Dudley Simpson	Frontier in Space
30.	"TARDIS Malfunctions (sequence)"	Dick Mills	Death to the Daleks
31.	"Exxilon City Beacon"	Dick Mills	Death to the Daleks
32.	"Death to the Daleks (Extended suite)"	Carey Blyton	Death to the Daleks
33.	"Aggedor's Temple Atmosphere, Peladon"	Dick Mills	The Monster of Peladon
34.	"Planet of the Spiders Part 2"	Dudley Simpson	Planet of the Spiders
35.	"Planet of the Spiders - Metebelis III Atmosphere"	Dick Mills	Planet of the Spiders
36.	"Doctor Who Closing Title Theme (1970)"	Delia Derbyshire	various

Disc 4 (Fourth Doctor)
No.	Title	Writer(s)	Serial/Episode	Length
1.	"Doctor Who Opening Title Theme"	Delia Derbyshire	various
2.	"Mysterious Robots"	Dudley Simpson	Robot
3.	"Nerva Beacon Infrastructure and T-Mat Couch"	Dick Mills	The Ark in Space
4.	"Styre's Scouting Machine"	Dick Mills	The Sontaran Experiment
5.	"Revenge of the Cybermen (Extended Suite)"	Carey Blyton	Revenge of the Cybermen
6.	"The Destruction of Charlie Rig"	Geoffrey Burgon	Terror of the Zygons
7.	"A Landing In Scotland"	Geoffrey Burgon	Terror of the Zygons
8.	"The Zygons Attack"	Geoffrey Burgon	Terror of the Zygons
9.	"Monster on the Moor"	Geoffrey Burgon	Terror of the Zygons
10.	"The Android Invasion Parts 3 & 4 (Extended Suite)"	Dudley Simpson	The Android Invasion
11.	"The Planet Karn"	Dick Mills	The Brain of Morbius
12.	"Antarctica: The First Pod"	Geoffrey Burgon	The Seeds of Doom
13.	"Harrison Chase"	Geoffrey Burgon	The Seeds of Doom
14.	"The Hymn of the Plants"	Geoffrey Burgon	The Seeds of Doom
15.	"Get Dunbar! / Krynoid On The Loose"	Geoffrey Burgon	The Seeds of Doom
16.	"The Mandragora Helix"	Dick Mills	The Masque of Mandragora
17.	"Inside the Doctor's Mind"	Dick Mills	The Invisible Enemy
18.	"The Sun Makers"	Dudley Simpson	The Sun Makers
19.	"The Invasion of Time Parts 3 and 4"	Dudley Simpson	The Invasion of Time
20.	"Movellan Runs Down"	Dick Mills	Destiny of the Daleks
21.	"Nova Device Countdown and Explosion"	Dick Mills	Destiny of the Daleks
22.	"Pretty Planet"	Dick Mills	Nightmare of Eden
23.	"Doctor Who Closing Titles (40" Version)"	Delia Derbyshire	various
24.	"Doctor Who 1980 (Opening Titles)"	Peter Howell	various
25.	"Into Argolis"	Peter Howell	The Leisure Hive
26.	"Earth Shuttle Arrives"	Peter Howell	The Leisure Hive
27.	"The Deons"	Paddy Kingsland	Meglos
28.	"Meglos"	Peter Howell	Meglos
29.	"Summons to Gallifrey"	Paddy Kingsland	Full Circle
30.	"K9 on a Mission"	Paddy Kingsland	Full Circle
31.	"Banqueting Music"	Peter Howell	Warriors' Gate
32.	"Nyssa's Theme"	Roger Limb	The Keeper of Traken
33.	"Kassia's Wedding Music"	Roger Limb	The Keeper of Traken
34.	"The Threat of Melkur"	Roger Limb	The Keeper of Traken
35.	"TARDIS Interior (Flying, Landing Beep, Stationary, Cloister Bell)"	Dick Mills	Logopolis
36.	"It's The End..."	Paddy Kingsland	Logopolis
37.	"Doctor Who 1980 (Closing Titles)"	Peter Howell	various

Disc 5 (Fifth Doctor)
No.	Title	Writer(s)	Serial/Episode	Length
1.	"The Moment Has Been Prepared For"	Paddy Kingsland	Castrovalva
2.	"Doctor Who Theme (1980 - Full Version)"	Peter Howell	various
3.	"Castrovalva (Suite)"	Paddy Kingsland	Castrovalva
4.	"Exploring the Lab"	Roger Limb	Four to Doomsday
5.	"Nyssa is Hypnotised"	Roger Limb	Four to Doomsday
6.	"TSS Machine Attacked"	Peter Howell	Kinda
7.	"Black Orchid"	Roger Limb	Black Orchid
8.	"March of the Cybermen"	Malcolm Clarke	Earthshock
9.	"Omega Force Field"	Roger Limb	Arc of Infinity
10.	"Ergon Threat"	Roger Limb	Arc of Infinity
11.	"The Termination of the Doctor"	Roger Limb	Arc of Infinity
12.	"Janissary Band"	Peter Howell	Snakedance
13.	"Mawdryn Undead (Suite)"	Paddy Kingsland	Mawdryn Undead
14.	"Enlightenment"	Malcolm Clarke	Enlightenment
15.	"The King's Demons"	Jonathan Gibbs	The King's Demons
16.	"The Five Doctors"	Peter Howell	"The Five Doctors"
17.	"Warriors of the Deep"	Jonathan Gibbs	Warriors of the Deep
18.	"The Awakening"	Peter Howell	The Awakening
19.	"Frontios (Suite)"	Paddy Kingsland	Frontios
20.	"Resurrection of the Daleks"	Malcolm Clarke	Resurrection of the Daleks
21.	"Planet of Fire"	Peter Howell	Planet of Fire
22.	"The Caves of Androzani (Extended Suite)"	Roger Limb	The Caves of Androzani

Disc 6 (Sixth Doctor)
No.	Title	Writer(s)	Serial/Episode	Length
1.	"The Twin Dilemma (Extended Suite)"	Malcolm Clarke	The Twin Dilemma
2.	"Attack of the Cybermen (Suite)"	Malcolm Clarke	Attack of the Cybermen
3.	"Vengeance on Varos (Suite)"	Jonathan Gibbs	Vengeance on Varos
4.	"The Mark of the Rani (Extended Suite)"	Jonathan Gibbs	The Mark of the Rani
5.	"The Two Doctors (Extended Suite)"	Peter Howell	The Two Doctors
6.	"Timelash"	Elizabeth Parker	Timelash
7.	"Revelation of the Daleks (The Funeral Parlour)"	Dick Mills	Revelation of the Daleks
8.	"Revelation of the Daleks"	Roger Limb	Revelation of the Daleks
9.	"Doctor Who Theme (1986 - Opening)"	Dominic Glynn	The Trial of a Time Lord
10.	"The Mysterious Planet (Extended Suite)"	Dominic Glynn	The Mysterious Planet
11.	"Mindwarp (sound effects montage) ("Machine"/"Sil's Chamber"/"Test Room Background"/"Light Tunnel Background"/"Force Beam and TARDIS"/"Time Bubble"/"Unfreeze")"	Dick Mills	Mindwarp
12.	"Terror of the Vervoids (Extended Suite)"	Malcolm Clarke	Terror of the Vervoids
13.	"The Ultimate Foe (Extended Suite)"	Dominic Glynn	The Ultimate Foe
14.	"Doctor Who Theme (1986 - Closing)"	Dominic Glynn	The Trial of a Time Lord

Disc 7 (Seventh Doctor)
No.	Title	Writer(s)	Serial/Episode	Length
1.	"It's the Man I Want"	Keff McCulloch	Time and the Rani
2.	"Doctor Who Theme (1987 - Opening)"	Keff McCulloch	various
3.	"Time and the Rani (Extended Suite)"	Keff McCulloch	Time and the Rani
4.	"Taken to the Cleaners"	Keff McCulloch	Paradise Towers
5.	"Drinksmat Dawning"	Keff McCulloch	Paradise Towers
6.	"The Making of Pex"	Keff McCulloch	Paradise Towers
7.	"Delta and the Bannermen"	Keff McCulloch	Delta and the Bannermen
8.	"Here's to the Future (featuring The Lorells)"	Keff McCulloch	Delta and the Bannermen
9.	"Dragonfire (Extended Suite)"	Dominic Glynn	Dragonfire
10.	"Remembrance of the Daleks (Extended Suite)"	Keff McCulloch	Remembrance of the Daleks
11.	"Time Will Tell"	Keff McCulloch	Remembrance of the Daleks
12.	"The Happiness Patrol"	Dominic Glynn	The Happiness Patrol
13.	"Fourth Reich"	Keff McCulloch	Silver Nemesis
14.	"Landing of the Cybermen"	Keff McCulloch	Silver Nemesis
15.	"Shooting at Us"	Keff McCulloch	Silver Nemesis
16.	"The Greatest Show in the Galaxy (Extended Suite)"	Mark Ayres	The Greatest Show in the Galaxy
17.	"Battlefield (Extended Suite)"	Keff McCulloch	Battlefield
18.	"Ghost Light"	Mark Ayres	Ghost Light
19.	"The Curse of Fenric (Extended Suite)"	Mark Ayres	The Curse of Fenric
20.	"Survival (Extended Suite)"	Dominic Glynn	Survival
21.	"...and somewhere else, the tea's getting cold"	Dominic Glynn	Survival
22.	"Doctor Who Theme (1987 - Closing)"	Keff McCulloch	various

Disc 8 (Eighth Doctor)
No.	Title	Writer(s)	Serial/Episode	Length
1.	"Prologue: Skaro / Doctor Who Theme / The Casket"	John Debney	Doctor Who
2.	"Breakout"	John Debney	Doctor Who
3.	"Wimps / Doctor #7 is Shot"	John Debney	Doctor Who
4.	"Aftermath"	John Debney	Doctor Who
5.	"Mr Smith and the Ambulance"	John Debney	Doctor Who
6.	"I Am Not Human"	John Debney	Doctor Who
7.	"Flatline"	John Debney	Doctor Who
8.	"X-Ray / Snake in the Bathroom"	John Debney	Doctor Who
9.	"The Taking of Bruce"	John Debney	Doctor Who
10.	"Seven to Eight"	John Debney	Doctor Who
11.	"Who Am I?"	John Debney	Doctor Who
12.	"City Scape"	John Debney	Doctor Who
13.	"Bad Morning"	John Debney	Doctor Who
14.	"Time"	John Debney	Doctor Who
15.	"I Quit"	John Debney	Doctor Who
16.	"Primitive Wiring / The UnBruce"	John Debney	Doctor Who
17.	"Two Hearts"	John Debney	Doctor Who
18.	"The TARDIS / True Identity"	John Debney	Doctor Who
19.	"Night Walk"	John Debney	Doctor Who
20.	"The Eye of Harmony / Half Human"	John Debney	Doctor Who
21.	"Until Midnight / Atomic Clock"	John Debney	Doctor Who
22.	"Green Eyes"	John Debney	Doctor Who
23.	"The Chase"	John Debney	Doctor Who
24.	"Beryllium Clock / Bragg's Key"	John Debney	Doctor Who
25.	"Jelly Baby"	John Debney	Doctor Who
26.	"Slimed"	John Debney	Doctor Who
27.	"Under the Influence"	John Debney	Doctor Who
28.	"Crown of Nails"	John Debney	Doctor Who
29.	"Lee's Last Chance"	John Debney	Doctor Who
30.	"Open the Eye"	John Debney	Doctor Who
31.	"Reroute Power! / Temporal Orbit"	John Debney	Doctor Who
32.	"To Hold Death Back"	John Debney	Doctor Who
33.	"Farewell"	John Debney	Doctor Who
34.	"End Credits / Doctor Who Theme"	John Debney	Doctor Who

Disc 9 (Ninth Doctor)
No.	Title	Writer(s)	Serial/Episode	Length
1.	"Doctor Who Theme - TV Version"	Murray Gold	various
2.	"Westminster Bridge"	Murray Gold	"Rose"
3.	"Seeking the Doctor"	Murray Gold	"Rose"
4.	"The Doctor's Theme"	Murray Gold	"Rose"
5.	"Clockwork TARDIS"	Murray Gold	"The End of the World"
6.	"Cassandra's Waltz"	Murray Gold	"The End of the World"
7.	"Rose's Theme"	Murray Gold	"The End of the World"
8.	"Slitheen"	Murray Gold	"Aliens of London"
9.	"Harriet Jones, Prime Minister"	Murray Gold	"World War Three"
10.	"The Lone Dalek"	Murray Gold	"Dalek"
11.	"Father's Day"	Murray Gold	"Father's Day"
12.	"Boom Town (Suite)"	Murray Gold	"Boom Town"
13.	"Monster Bossa"	Murray Gold	"Boom Town"
14.	"Rose in Peril"	Murray Gold	"Bad Wolf"
15.	"The Daleks"	Murray Gold	"Bad Wolf"
16.	"I'm Coming to Get You"	Murray Gold	"Bad Wolf"
17.	"Finding Jackie"	Murray Gold	"The Parting of the Ways"
18.	"Rose Defeats the Daleks"	Murray Gold	"The Parting of the Ways"
19.	"Hologram"	Murray Gold	"The Parting of the Ways"
20.	"New Adventures"	Murray Gold	"The Parting of the Ways"
21.	"Doctor Who Theme - Album Version"	Murray Gold	unaired

Disc 9: Classic Doctor Who - Bonus Tracks
No.	Title	Writer(s)	Serial/Episode	Length
22.	"Behind the Sofa"	Mark Ayres	More Than 30 Years In The TARDIS
23.	"Doctor Who 1986"	Dominic Glynn	various
24.	"Doctor Who 1987"	Keff McCulloch	various
25.	"Back to the TARDIS (version 1)"	Mark Ayres	30 Years In The TARDIS
26.	"...and somewhere else, the tea's getting cold"	Dominic Glynn	Survival
27.	"Back to the TARDIS (version 2)"	Mark Ayres	More Than 30 Years In The TARDIS

Disc 9: The New Series - The Tenth Doctor - Bonus Tracks
No.	Title	Writer(s)	Serial/Episode	Length
28.	"The Doctor Forever"	Murray Gold	"The Runaway Bride"
29.	"Song For Ten (Vocal - Neil Hannon)"	Murray Gold	"The Christmas Invasion"
30.	"My Angel Put The Devil In Me (Vocal - Yamit Mamo)"	Murray Gold	"Daleks in Manhattan"
31.	"The Cyberleader Runs Amok"	Murray Gold	"The Next Doctor"
32.	"Never Too Old to Shoot and Fly"	Murray Gold	"The End of Time"

Disc 9: The New Series - The Eleventh Doctor - Bonus Tracks
No.	Title	Writer(s)	Serial/Episode	Length
33.	"Emotions Get the Better Of Him"	Murray Gold	"Victory of the Daleks"
34.	"Impossible Choice"	Murray Gold	"The Beast Below"
35.	"Glasgow"	Murray Gold	"The Name of the Doctor"
36.	"Whisper Men"	Murray Gold	"The Name of the Doctor"

Disc 10 (Tenth Doctor)
No.	Title	Writer(s)	Serial/Episode	Length
1.	"Sycorax Encounter"	Murray Gold	"The Christmas Invasion"
2.	"The Face of Boe"	Murray Gold	"New Earth"
3.	"Tooth and Claw (Note: Shortened from original release)"	Murray Gold	"Tooth and Claw"
4.	"Madame de Pompadour"	Murray Gold	"The Girl in the Fireplace"
5.	"Cybermen"	Murray Gold	"Rise of the Cybermen" / "The Age of Steel"
6.	"Doomsday"	Murray Gold	"Doomsday"
7.	"The Runaway Bride"	Murray Gold	"The Runaway Bride"
8.	"Martha's Theme"	Murray Gold	"Smith and Jones"
9.	"Gridlocked Cassinis"	Murray Gold	"Gridlock"
10.	"All the Strange, Strange Creatures "	Murray Gold	"Gridlock"
11.	"Evolution of the Daleks"	Murray Gold	"Daleks in Manhattan" / "Evolution of the Daleks"
12.	"Mr. Smith and Joan"	Murray Gold	"Human Nature" / "The Family of Blood"
13.	"Just Scarecrows to War"	Murray Gold	"Human Nature" / "The Family of Blood"
14.	"Blink (Suite)"	Murray Gold	"Blink"
15.	"The Futurekind"	Murray Gold	"Utopia"
16.	"This is Gallifrey: Our Childhood, Our Home"	Murray Gold	"The Sound of Drums" / "Last of the Time Lords"
17.	"Doctor Who - Season 4 Opening Credits"	Murray Gold	various
18.	"Voyage of the Damned (Suite)"	Murray Gold	"Voyage of the Damned"
19.	"A Noble Girl About Town"	Murray Gold	"Partners in Crime"
20.	"Songs of Captivity and Freedom"	Murray Gold	"Planet of the Ood"
21.	"UNIT Rocks"	Murray Gold	"The Sontaran Stratagem" / "The Poison Sky"
22.	"The Doctor's Daughter"	Murray Gold	"The Doctor's Daughter"
23.	"Silence in the Library"	Murray Gold	"Silence in the Library" / "Forest of the Dead"
24.	"Midnight"	Murray Gold	"Midnight"
25.	"Turn Left"	Murray Gold	"Turn Left"
26.	"Song of Freedom"	Murray Gold	"The Stolen Earth" / "Journey's End"
27.	"Not the Doctor"	Murray Gold	"The Next Doctor"
28.	"A Special Sort of Bus"	Murray Gold	"Planet of the Dead"
29.	"By Water Borne"	Murray Gold	"The Waters of Mars"
30.	"Vale Decem"	Murray Gold	"The End of Time"

Disc 11 (Eleventh Doctor)
No.	Title	Writer(s)	Serial/Episode	Length
1.	"Doctor Who XI"	Murray Gold	various
2.	"Little Amy"	Murray Gold	"The Eleventh Hour"
3.	"I Am the Doctor"	Murray Gold	"The Eleventh Hour"
4.	"The Mad Man with A Box"	Murray Gold	"The Eleventh Hour"
5.	"The Beast Below"	Murray Gold	"The Beast Below"
6.	"Battle In The Sky"	Murray Gold	"Victory of the Daleks"
7.	"The Time Of Angels"	Murray Gold	"The Time of Angels" / "Flesh and Stone"
8.	"This Is The Dream"	Murray Gold	"Amy's Choice"
9.	"The Silurians"	Murray Gold	"The Hungry Earth" / "Cold Blood"
10.	"A Troubled Man"	Murray Gold	"Vincent and the Doctor"
11.	"Words Win Wars"	Murray Gold	"The Pandorica Opens" / "The Big Bang"
12.	"The Life and Death Of Amy Pond"	Murray Gold	"The Pandorica Opens" / "The Big Bang"
13.	"The Sad Man With A Box"	Murray Gold	"The Pandorica Opens" / "The Big Bang"
14.	"Abigail's Song (Silence Is All You Know) (Vocal - Katherine Jenkins)"	Murray Gold	"A Christmas Carol"
15.	"The Impossible Astronaut"	Murray Gold	"The Impossible Astronaut" / "Day of the Moon"
16.	"Deadly Siren"	Murray Gold	"The Curse of the Black Spot"
17.	"Run, Sexy"	Murray Gold	"The Doctor's Wife"
18.	"Which One Is The Flesh?"	Murray Gold	"The Rebel Flesh" / "The Almost People"
19.	"The Enigma of River Song"	Murray Gold	"Let's Kill Hitler"
20.	"Lost In the Wrong Stream"	Murray Gold	"The Girl Who Waited"
21.	"Make Peace"	Murray Gold	"A Town Called Mercy"
22.	"Together or Not At All (The Song of Amy and Rory)"	Murray Gold	"The Angels Take Manhattan"
23.	"Clara in the TARDIS"	Murray Gold	"The Snowmen"
24.	"Up the Shard"	Murray Gold	"The Bells of Saint John"
25.	"The Long Song"	Murray Gold	"The Rings of Akhaten"
26.	"A Machine That Makes Machines"	Murray Gold	"Journey to the Centre of the TARDIS"
27.	"What Is His Name?"	Murray Gold	"The Name of the Doctor"
28.	"Remember Me"	Murray Gold	"The Name of the Doctor"
29.	"The Majestic Tale (Of A Madman In A Box)"	Murray Gold	"Day of the Moon"

=== Vinyl version ===
Disc 1
No.	Title	Writer(s)	Serial/Episode	Length
1.	"Doctor Who (Original Theme)"	Ron Grainer & Delia Derbyshire	various
2.	"Three Guitars Mood 2"	Derek Nelson & Arthur Raymond	An Unearthly Child
3.	"TARDIS Takeoff"	Brian Hodgson	An Unearthly Child
4.	"Growing Menace"	Tristram Cary	The Daleks' Master Plan
5.	"The Ballad of the Last Chance Saloon"	Lynda Baron & Tom McCall	The Gunfighters
6.	"Heartbeat Chase"	Brian Hodgson	The Macra Terror
7.	"Universe Sidereal"	Paul Bonneau and his Orchestra	The Tomb of the Cybermen
8.	"Space Time Music Part 1"	Westway Studio Orchestra	The Tomb of the Cybermen
9.	"Space Time Music Part 2"	Westway Studio Orchestra	The Web of Fear
10.	"Zoe's Theme"	Brian Hodgson	The Mind Robber
11.	"Time Lord Court"	Brian Hodgson	The War Games
12.	"The Axons Approach"	Brian Hodgson	The Claws of Axos
13.	"The Sea Devils"	Malcolm Clarke	The Sea Devils
14.	"The Mutants"	Tristram Cary	The Mutants
15.	"Death to the Daleks"	London Saxophone Quartet	Death to the Daleks
16.	"Metebelis III Atmosphere"	Dick Mills	Planet of the Spiders

Disc 2
No.	Title	Writer(s)	Serial/Episode	Length
1.	"Doctor Who Opening Title Theme"	Delia Derbyshire	various
2.	"Revenge of the Cybermen"	Carey Blyton and Orchestra	Revenge of the Cybermen
3.	"The Android Invasion, Episodes 3 and 4"	Dudley Simpson	The Android Invasion
4.	"Antarctica – The First Pod"	Geoffrey Burgon and Orchestra	The Seeds of Doom
5.	"Get Dunbar! / Krynoid On The Loose"	Geoffrey Burgon and Orchestra	The Seeds of Doom
6.	"The Invasion of Time, Episodes 3 and 4"	Dudley Simpson	The Invasion of Time
7.	"Castrovalva (Suite)"	Paddy Kingsland	Castrovalva
8.	"March of the Cybermen"	Malcolm Clarke	Earthshock
9.	"The Five Doctors"	Peter Howell	"The Five Doctors"
10.	"Resurrection of the Daleks"	Malcolm Clarke	Resurrection of the Daleks

Disc 3
No.	Title	Writer(s)	Serial/Episode	Length
1.	"The Twin Dilemma"	Malcolm Clarke	The Twin Dilemma
2.	"The Mark of the Rani"	Jonathan Gibbs	The Mark of the Rani
3.	"The Two Doctors"	Peter Howell	The Two Doctors
4.	"Timelash"	Elizabeth Parker	Timelash
5.	"The Ultimate Foe"	Dominic Glynn	The Ultimate Foe
6.	"Remembrance of the Daleks"	Keff McCulloch	Remembrance of the Daleks
7.	"The Curse of Fenric"	Mark Ayres	The Curse of Fenric
8.	"Survival"	Dominic Glynn	Survival
9.	"...and somewhere else, the tea's getting cold"	Dominic Glynn	Survival
10.	"Prologue: Skaro / Doctor Who Theme"	John Debney	Doctor Who
11.	"Farewell"	John Debney	Doctor Who

Disc 4
No.	Title	Writer(s)	Serial/Episode	Length
1.	"Doctor Who Theme – TV Version"	Ron Grainer & Murray Gold	various
2.	"Rose's Theme"	Murray Gold	"The End of the World"
3.	"Doomsday"	Murray Gold	"Doomsday"
4.	"The Doctor Forever"	Murray Gold	"The Runaway Bride"
5.	"Martha's Theme"	Murray Gold	"Smith and Jones"
6.	"All the Strange, Strange Creatures"	Murray Gold	"Gridlock"
7.	"Vale Decem"	Murray Gold	"The End of Time"
8.	"I Am the Doctor"	Murray Gold	"The Eleventh Hour"
9.	"The Mad Man with a Box"	Murray Gold	"The Eleventh Hour"
10.	"Amy's Theme"	Murray Gold	"The Beast Below"
11.	"Melody Pond"	Murray Gold	"A Good Man Goes to War"
12.	"Together or Not at All – The Song of Amy and Rory"	Murray Gold	"The Angels Take Manhattan"
13.	"This Time There's Three of Us (The Majestic Tale)"	Murray Gold	"The Day of the Doctor"
