= Doctor Who: The Seventh Doctor Adventures =

Audio play series

The Seventh Doctor Adventures

Big Finish Productions audio drama
- Series: Doctor Who
- Featuring: Seventh Doctor
- Executive producers: Jason Haigh-Ellery; Nicholas Briggs
- Release date: January 2001 (retroactively); June 2022 (actual)

The Seventh Doctor Adventures is a Big Finish Productions audio play series based on the television series Doctor Who. It sees the return of Sylvester McCoy reprising his role as the Seventh Doctor.

== History ==
In 1999, beginning with the story "The Sirens of Time", Big Finish Productions began producing a series of audio adventures featuring the Fifth Doctor, Sixth Doctor and Seventh Doctor. For 22 years these stories continued collectively known as Big Finish's "Main Range". In May 2020, Big Finish announced the main range would conclude in March 2021 and subsequently replaced with regular releases of each Doctor's adventures continuing in their own respective ranges. Few previously released special titles were retroactively reallocated into these new ranges by Big Finish.

== Cast ==
List indicator

This section includes characters who will appear or have appeared in at least one season.

- A green cell indicates the actor is a main cast member.
- A red cell indicates the actor is a recurring cast member.
- A light blue cell indicates the actor is a guest or special guest cast member.

Actor	Character	Appearances											
Actor	Character	Sp.	TNA	S&I	SaC - AWOL	FfH	TLD		TDaC	PF	Wicked!	Fixers	Homecoming
Actor	Character	Sp.	TNA	S&I	SaC - AWOL	FfH	1	2	TDaC	PF	Wicked!	Fixers	Homecoming
Sylvester McCoy	The Doctor	✓	✓	✓	✓	✓	✓	✓	✓	✓	✓	✓	✓
Yasmin Bannerman	Roz Forrester		✓					✓					
Travis Oliver	Chris Cwej		✓					✓					
Bonnie Langford	Melanie Bush			✓			✓	✓					
Christopher Naylor	Harry Sullivan				✓	✓				✓			
Sophie Aldred	Ace						✓	✓			✓		✓
Lisa Bowerman	Bernice Summerfield						✓	✓					
Philip Olivier	Hex Schofield						✓	✓					✓
Maggie O'Neill	Lysandra Aristedes						✓	✓					
Amy Pemberton	Sally Morgan						✓	✓					
Sara Griffiths	Ray											✓	

=== Notable Guests ===
- Nicholas Briggs as Daleks & Ogrons
- Geoffrey Beevers as The Master
- Edward Peel as Kane
- Dan Starkey as Sontarans & Thomas Carnacki
- Chase Masterson as Vienna Salvatori
- Simon Callow as Don Quixote

== Episodes ==
=== Specials ===
No.	Title	Directed by	Written by	Featuring	Released
1	"Last of the Titans"	Nicholas Briggs	Nicholas Briggs	Seventh Doctor	January 2001
2	"Return of the Daleks"	John Ainsworth	Nicholas Briggs	Seventh Doctor, Daleks, Ogrons	December 2007

=== The Seventh Doctor: The New Adventures (2018) ===
No.	Title	Directed by	Written by	Featuring	Released
1	"The Trial of a Time Machine"	Scott Handcock	Andy Lane	Seventh Doctor, Roz, Chris	November 2018
2	"Vanguard"	Scott Handcock	Steve Jordan	Seventh Doctor, Roz, Chris	November 2018
3	"The Jabari Countdown"	Scott Handcock	Alan Flanagan	Seventh Doctor, Roz, Chris	November 2018
4	"The Dread of Night"	Scott Handcock	Tim Foley	Seventh Doctor, Roz, Chris	November 2018

=== Silver & Ice (2022) ===
No.	Title	Directed by	Written by	Featuring	Released
1	"Bad Day in Tinseltown"	Samuel Clemens	Dan Starkey	Seventh Doctor, Melanie Bush	June 2022
2	"The Ribos Inheritance"	Samuel Clemens	Jonathan Barnes	Seventh Doctor, Melanie Bush	June 2022
–	"Interlude: The Haunting of Bryck Place"	Read by: Sophie Aldred	Georgia Cook	Seventh Doctor, Ace	June 2022

=== Sullivan and Cross – AWOL (2022) ===
No.	Title	Directed by	Written by	Featuring	Released
1	"London Orbital"	Bethany Weimers	John Dorney	Seventh Doctor, Harry Sullivan, Naomi Cross	November 2022
2	"Scream of the Daleks"	Bethany Weimers	Lisa McMullin	Seventh Doctor, Harry, Naomi, Daleks	November 2022

=== Far From Home (2023) ===
No.	Title	Directed by	Written by	Featuring	Released
1	"Operation Dusk"	Samuel Clemens	Alfie Shaw	Seventh Doctor, Harry, Naomi, Vashta Nerada, The Forge	June 2023
2	"Naomi’s Ark"	Samuel Clemens	Allison Winter	Seventh Doctor, Harry, Naomi	June 2023
–	"Interlude: Frozen Worlds"	Read by: Sophie Aldred	Katherine Armitage	Seventh Doctor	June 2023

=== The Last Day (2023–24) ===
The title was revealed on 27 June 2023. The 12 part story is set after The Monthly Adventures' Dark Universe and leads directly into the TV Movie. Big Finish's official plot synopsis says "There is always injustice to fight. There is always a new danger for the universe. But what if the Doctor found a way to put things right, once and for all? Would it really be so terrible to take a stand? Would the end justify the means? And would his friends agree? The Seventh Doctor’s last day is coming…"

No.	Title	Directed by	Written by	Featuring	Released
Part One
1	"Part 1"	Samuel Clemens	Matt Fitton & Guy Adams	Seventh Doctor, Ace, Melanie Bush, The Master, Bernice Summerfield, Lysandra Aristedes, Hex Schofield, Kane, Sally Morgan, Sontarans	December 2023
2	"Part 2"	Samuel Clemens	Matt Fitton & Guy Adams	Seventh Doctor, Ace, Melanie Bush, The Master, Bernice Summerfield, Lysandra Aristedes, Hex Schofield, Kane, Sally Morgan, Sontarans	December 2023
3	"Part 3"	Samuel Clemens	Matt Fitton & Guy Adams	Seventh Doctor, Ace, Melanie Bush, The Master, Bernice Summerfield, Lysandra Aristedes, Hex Schofield, Kane, Sally Morgan, Sontarans	December 2023
4	"Part 4"	Samuel Clemens	Matt Fitton & Guy Adams	Seventh Doctor, Ace, Melanie Bush, The Master, Bernice Summerfield, Lysandra Aristedes, Hex Schofield, Kane, Sally Morgan, Sontarans	December 2023
5	"Part 5"	Samuel Clemens	Matt Fitton & Guy Adams	Seventh Doctor, Ace, Melanie Bush, The Master, Bernice Summerfield, Lysandra Aristedes, Hex Schofield, Kane, Sally Morgan, Sontarans	December 2023
6	"Part 6"	Samuel Clemens	Matt Fitton & Guy Adams	Seventh Doctor, Ace, Melanie Bush, The Master, Bernice Summerfield, Lysandra Aristedes, Hex Schofield, Kane, Sally Morgan, Sontarans	December 2023
Part Two
1	"Part 7"	Samuel Clemens	Matt Fitton & Guy Adams	Seventh Doctor, Ace, Melanie Bush, Roz Forrester, The Master, Bernice Summerfield, Vienna Salvatori, Lysandra Aristedes, Chris Cwej, Hex Schofield, Kane, Sally Morgan, Ogrons, Sontarans	June 2024
2	"Part 8"	Samuel Clemens	Matt Fitton & Guy Adams	Seventh Doctor, Ace, Melanie Bush, Roz Forrester, The Master, Bernice Summerfield, Vienna Salvatori, Lysandra Aristedes, Chris Cwej, Hex Schofield, Kane, Sally Morgan, Ogrons, Sontarans	June 2024
3	"Part 9"	Samuel Clemens	Matt Fitton & Guy Adams	Seventh Doctor, Ace, Melanie Bush, Roz Forrester, The Master, Bernice Summerfield, Vienna Salvatori, Lysandra Aristedes, Chris Cwej, Hex Schofield, Kane, Sally Morgan, Ogrons, Sontarans	June 2024
4	"Part 10"	Samuel Clemens	Matt Fitton & Guy Adams	Seventh Doctor, Ace, Melanie Bush, Roz Forrester, The Master, Bernice Summerfield, Vienna Salvatori, Lysandra Aristedes, Chris Cwej, Hex Schofield, Kane, Sally Morgan, Ogrons, Sontarans	June 2024
5	"Part 11"	Samuel Clemens	Matt Fitton & Guy Adams	Seventh Doctor, Ace, Melanie Bush, Roz Forrester, The Master, Bernice Summerfield, Vienna Salvatori, Lysandra Aristedes, Chris Cwej, Hex Schofield, Kane, Sally Morgan, Ogrons, Sontarans	June 2024
6	"Part 12"	Samuel Clemens	Matt Fitton & Guy Adams	Seventh Doctor, Ace, Melanie Bush, Roz Forrester, The Master, Bernice Summerfield, Vienna Salvatori, Lysandra Aristedes, Chris Cwej, Hex Schofield, Kane, Sally Morgan, Ogrons, Sontarans	June 2024
–	"Interlude: Fond Memories"	Read by: Sophie Aldred	Alison Lawson	Seventh Doctor, Ace	June 2024

=== The Doctor and Carnacki (2024) ===
No.	Title	Directed by	Written by	Featuring	Released
1	"The Haunter of the Shore"	Samuel Clemens	AK Benedict	Seventh Doctor, Thomas Carnacki	November 2024
2	"The House"	Samuel Clemens	Georgia Cook	Seventh Doctor, Thomas Carnacki	November 2024
3	"The Institute of Forgotten Souls"	Samuel Clemens	Jonathan Barnes	Seventh Doctor, Thomas Carnacki	November 2024

=== Past Forward (2025) ===
No.	Title	Directed by	Written by	Featuring	Released
1	"With the Angels (Part 1)"	Samuel Clemens	John Dorney	Seventh Doctor, Harry, Naomi	June 2025
2	"Catastrophix"	Samuel Clemens	Lizzie Hopley	Seventh Doctor, Harry, Naomi	June 2025
3	"With the Angels (Part 2)"	Samuel Clemens	John Dorney	Seventh Doctor, Harry, Naomi	June 2025

=== Wicked! (2025) ===
No.	Title	Directed by	Written by	Featuring	Released
1	"Backwards and in Heels"	Samuel Clemens	Alison Winter	Seventh Doctor, Ace	October 2025
2	"The Price of Snow"	Samuel Clemens	Katharine Armitage	Seventh Doctor, Ace	October 2025
3	"The Ingeniuous Gentlemen"	Samuel Clemens	Alan Ronald	Seventh Doctor, Ace	October 2025

=== Fixers (2026) ===
No.	Title	Directed by	Written by	Featuring	Released
1	"The Executor"	Samuel Clemens	Chris Chapman	Seventh Doctor, Ray	July 2026
2	"Oil and Water"	Samuel Clemens	James McDermott	Seventh Doctor, Ray	July 2026
3	"Much Ado About Racing"	Samuel Clemens	Fio Tretheway	Seventh Doctor, Ray	July 2026

=== Homecoming (2027) ===
No.	Title	Directed by	Written by	Featuring	Released
1	"The Auton Invasion"	Jonathan Morris	Jonathan S. Powell	Seventh Doctor, Ace, Hex	January 2027
2	"The Leviathan"	Jonathan Morris	Rochana Patel	Seventh Doctor, Ace, Hex	January 2027
3	"There's No Place Like Home"	Jonathan Morris	Jonathan Morris	Seventh Doctor, Ace, Hex	January 2027
