= Doctor Who season 24 =

1987 season of British sci-fi TV series

Doctor Who
- Season 24
- Cover art of the Blu-ray release for the complete season
- Starring: Sylvester McCoy; Bonnie Langford; Sophie Aldred
- No. of stories: 4
- No. of episodes: 14

Release
- Original network: BBC1
- Original release: 7 September – 7 December 1987

Season chronology
- ← Previous; Season 23 Next → Season 25

The twenty-fourth season of British science fiction television series Doctor Who began on 7 September 1987 with Sylvester McCoy's first story Time and the Rani, and ended with Dragonfire. John Nathan-Turner produced the series, with Andrew Cartmel script editing.

== Production ==
Colin Baker (contracted for four years starting in 1985) was originally due to reprise his role as the Sixth Doctor prior to his dismissal at the request of Michael Grade, who said that a 24th season would only happen if a new actor took the title role. Baker was offered the chance to film a single four-part story ending in his regeneration, but he declined (as he did not want to miss out on other work in the meantime), instead offering to do the entirety of the season and leave the show at its conclusion. The BBC never responded to his letter. Had Baker reprised his role, a story featuring the Sixth Doctor and Mel properly meeting for the first time was going to open the season. The opening story, Time and the Rani, was initially written as Baker's final story, initially titled Strange Matter, but due to Baker not returning, it was rewritten to accommodate his absence.

A new logo for the series was introduced with this season along with a new opening credits sequence that moved away from the "starfield" motif introduced in 1980, as producer John Nathan-Turner thought it was time for the series to have a brand new look. As with the opening sequence from the Sixth Doctor era, the Seventh Doctor's opening does not use a static image of the Doctor, but rather one with limited animation: the image of the Doctor starts as a scowl, then fades to a wink followed by a smile. McCoy wears makeup that gives his face and hair a silver/grey appearance. Episode four of Time and the Rani mistakenly uses an early version of this sequence, which gives the Doctor's face a shadowy look which producer John Nathan-Turner felt was not prominent enough.

=== Music ===
Keff McCulloch arranged the new opening theme. It was used until the end of the regular run of the series. The new theme arrangement marked the first time since the early part of the Second Doctor's era that the theme's "middle eight" section was regularly heard during the opening credits (the previous two arrangements used the middle eight during the closing credits only).

== Casting ==
=== Main cast ===
- Sylvester McCoy as the Seventh Doctor
- Bonnie Langford as Mel Bush
- Sophie Aldred as Ace

==== New Companion ====
The departure of Bonnie Langford saw plans to introduce a new companion. However, owing to Langford being undecided as to when she would actually leave the show, producer John Nathan-Turner asked writers Malcolm Kohll and Ian Briggs to formulate characters that could be used as potential companions. Kohll designed a character in his script, titled The Flight of the Chimeron (eventually to take shape as Delta and the Bannermen), called Ray. Initially, it appeared that The Flight of the Chimeron would be the final serial of the season, which would see Ray leave with the Doctor. However, by the time it came to production and scheduling for the season, Kohll's serial had been swapped in the running order with Ian Briggs' (which became Dragonfire), and led to Briggs' creation, who eventually became Ace, taking Mel's place with the Doctor.

=== Recurring stars ===
- Kate O'Mara as The Rani

O'Mara makes her second appearance as The Rani in McCoy's first serial Time and the Rani.

=== Guest stars ===
Sophie Aldred guest stars as Ace in Dragonfire; Ace joins the Doctor at the end of this story to become his companion throughout the next two seasons.

Tony Selby, having recently appeared in The Trial of a Time Lord, also made a guest appearance as Sabalom Glitz in the same story.

== Serials ==
Andrew Cartmel takes over as script editor. This season is moved to a Monday schedule.

The previous season, while ostensibly a single 14-part serial, was divided into three stories of four episodes and one of two episodes. For this season, this was re-jigged into a new format that would be followed over the next three years, with a pair of four-parters and a pair of three-parters. Not including The Two Doctors, which had episodes of 45-minute duration, Delta and the Bannermen was the first standard format (25-minute) 3 part serial since Planet of Giants in Season 2.

No. story	No. in season	Serial title	Episode titles	Directed by	Written by	Original release date	Prod. code	UK viewers (millions)	AI
144	1	Time and the Rani	"Part One"	Andrew Morgan	Pip and Jane Baker	7 September 1987	7D	5.1	58
144	1	Time and the Rani	"Part Two"	Andrew Morgan	Pip and Jane Baker	14 September 1987	7D	4.2	63
144	1	Time and the Rani	"Part Three"	Andrew Morgan	Pip and Jane Baker	21 September 1987	7D	4.3	57
144	1	Time and the Rani	"Part Four"	Andrew Morgan	Pip and Jane Baker	28 September 1987	7D	4.9	59
The Rani lures the TARDIS to Lakertya, where she requires the Doctor's aid to complete a device which will draw on the intelligence of history's greatest geniuses to help her reshape the universe to her own design. To this end, she drugs the newly regenerated Doctor and masquerades as Mel to gain his trust. The real Mel, however, allies herself with the native Lakertyans, who have been suffering under the rule of the Rani and her bat-like Tetraps. It is up to Mel to rouse the Lakertyans to rebellion, and free the Doctor from the Rani's clutches.
145	2	Paradise Towers	"Part One"	Nicholas Mallett	Stephen Wyatt	5 October 1987	7E	4.5	61
145	2	Paradise Towers	"Part Two"	Nicholas Mallett	Stephen Wyatt	12 October 1987	7E	5.2	58
145	2	Paradise Towers	"Part Three"	Nicholas Mallett	Stephen Wyatt	19 October 1987	7E	5.0	58
145	2	Paradise Towers	"Part Four"	Nicholas Mallett	Stephen Wyatt	26 October 1987	7E	5.0	57
The Doctor and Mel go to Paradise Towers for a holiday, only to find the famed complex in ruins. Long ago, the adults went off to fight a war and never returned. Left behind are the Kangs, gangs of wild teenaged girls; the Rezzies, cannibalistic old women; the Caretakers, who ostensibly look after the Towers; and Pex, who was too scared to go to war. But also lurking is Kroagnon, architect of Paradise Towers, who has taken mental possession of the Chief Caretaker and the cleaning robots in an attempt to rid his creation of human life forever.
146	3	Delta and the Bannermen	"Part One"	Chris Clough	Malcolm Kohll	2 November 1987	7F	5.3	63
146	3	Delta and the Bannermen	"Part Two"	Chris Clough	Malcolm Kohll	9 November 1987	7F	5.1	60
146	3	Delta and the Bannermen	"Part Three"	Chris Clough	Malcolm Kohll	16 November 1987	7F	5.4	60
The Doctor and Mel win a vacation on a time-travelling tour bus to a 1950s holiday camp. Also on the bus is Delta, the last of the Chimeron race, who is being hunted by the genocidal Bannermen and their brutish leader, Gavrok. When a mercenary on the bus alerts Gavrok to Delta's whereabouts, it is up to the Doctor and Mel to stop the assassins and find a way to give the Chimerons a new lease on life.
147	4	Dragonfire	"Part One"	Chris Clough	Ian Briggs	23 November 1987	7G	5.5	61
147	4	Dragonfire	"Part Two"	Chris Clough	Ian Briggs	30 November 1987	7G	5.0	61
147	4	Dragonfire	"Part Three"	Chris Clough	Ian Briggs	7 December 1987	7G	4.7	64
The TARDIS lands on Iceworld, an enormous shopping complex on Svartos. There, the Doctor and Mel meet up with a time-displaced teenaged waitress from Earth named Ace and their old friend Sabalom Glitz. Glitz is searching for the treasure of the legendary Dragon who is supposed to dwell beneath Iceworld. But when the Doctor joins Glitz in his quest, they discover more than they bargained for, unearthing the millennia-old secret of Kane, Iceworld's murderous ruler.

== Broadcast ==
The entire season was broadcast from 7 September to 7 December 1987. Transmission for this season moved to Monday nights. In this way, BBC1 scheduled it against Coronation Street on ITV, ensuring ratings struggles.

== Home media ==
=== VHS releases ===
Season	Story no.	Serial name	Duration	Release date		
Season	Story no.	Serial name	Duration	UK	Australia	USA / Canada
24	144	Time and the Rani	4 × 25 min.	July 1995	October 1995	September 1995
24	145	Paradise Towers	4 × 25 min.	October 1995	January 1997	June 1997
24	146	Delta and the Bannermen	3 × 25 min.	March 2001	—N/a	June 2002
24	147	Dragonfire	3 × 25 min.	February 1994	March 1994	February 1997

=== DVD and Blu-ray releases ===
All releases are for DVD unless otherwise indicated:

- ^{(B)} indicates a Blu-ray release

Season	Story no.	Serial name	Duration	Release date		
Season	Story no.	Serial name	Duration	R2	R4	R1
24	144	Time and the Rani (Note: Available individually or in the Regeneration box set in Region 2. Only available individually in Regions 1 & 4.)	4 × 25 min.	13 September 2010	4 November 2010	14 June 2011
24	145	Paradise Towers	4 × 25 min.	18 July 2011	7 September 2011	9 August 2011
24	146	Delta and the Bannermen	3 × 25 min.	22 June 2009	6 August 2009	1 September 2009
24	147	Dragonfire (Note: Only available as part of the Ace Adventures box set in Regions 2 and 4. Only available individually in Region 1.)	3 × 25 min.	7 May 2012	7 June 2012	8 May 2012
24	144–147	Complete Season 24 (Note: Released as Doctor Who: The Collection – Season 24 in Region B. Released as Doctor Who – Sylvester McCoy: Complete Season One in Region A.)	14 × 25 min. 14 × 30 min.	21 June 2021 ^{(B)}	25 August 2021 ^{(B)}	21 September 2021 ^{(B)}

== In print ==
Season	Story no.	Library no. (Note: Number in Target's Doctor Who Library, if applicable)	Novelisation title	Author	Hardcover release date (Note: Published by Target's parent companies (Allen Wingate, W. H. Allen, BBC Books) unless otherwise indicated)	Paperback release date (Note: Published by Target Books (or by BBC Books under the Target Collection umbrella) unless otherwise indicated)	Audiobook	
Season	Story no.	Library no.	Novelisation title	Author	Hardcover release date	Paperback release date	Release date (Note: Unabridged from BBC Audio / AudioGo unless otherwise indicated)	Narrator
24	144	128 (Note: Mistakenly numbered as number 127)	Time and the Rani	Pip and Jane Baker	17 December 1987	5 May 1988	6 January 2022	Bonnie Langford
24	145	134	Paradise Towers	Stephen Wyatt	—N/a	1 December 1988	5 April 2012	Bonnie Langford
24	146	135	Delta and the Bannermen	Malcolm Kohll	—N/a	19 January 1989	1 June 2017	Bonnie Langford
24	147	137	Dragonfire	Ian Briggs	—N/a	16 March 1989	5 December 2019	Bonnie Langford
