= Keff =

Keff may refer to:

- an abbreviation for the reactivity coefficient k-effective (written as k_{eff}), the effective neutron multiplication factor within an assembly of fissile material, in nuclear reactor theory
- Kerala Farmers Federation, an Indian organisation
- Keff McCulloch, a British composer
- Keff Ratcliffe, a Welsh musician and the former guitarist for the American band LA Guns.
