= Time and the Rani =

144 – Time and the Rani
- Doctor Who serial
- Promotional photo of Kate O'Mara as The Rani for the serial

Cast
- Doctor: Sylvester McCoy – Seventh Doctor
- Companion: Bonnie Langford – Mel Bush
- Others: Kate O'Mara – The Rani; Mark Greenstreet – Ikona; Donald Pickering – Beyus; Wanda Ventham – Faroon; Karen Clegg – Sarn; Richard Gauntlett – Urak; John Segal – Lanisha; Peter Tuddenham, Jacki Webb – Special Voices

Production
- Directed by: Andrew Morgan
- Written by: Pip and Jane Baker
- Script editor: Andrew Cartmel
- Produced by: John Nathan-Turner
- Music by: Keff McCulloch
- Production code: 7D
- Series: Season 24
- Running time: 4 episodes, 25 minutes each
- First broadcast: 7 September 1987
- Last broadcast: 28 September 1987

Chronology
← Preceded by The Trial of a Time Lord: The Ultimate Foe	Followed by → Paradise Towers

Time and the Rani is the first serial of the 24th season of the British science fiction television series Doctor Who, which was first broadcast in four weekly parts from 7 to 28 September 1987. It was the first to feature Sylvester McCoy as the Seventh Doctor.

In the serial, the renegade Time Lady the Rani (Kate O'Mara) brings the greatest geniuses from time and space to her laboratory on the planet Lakertya so she can use their minds to power her time manipulator.

== Plot ==
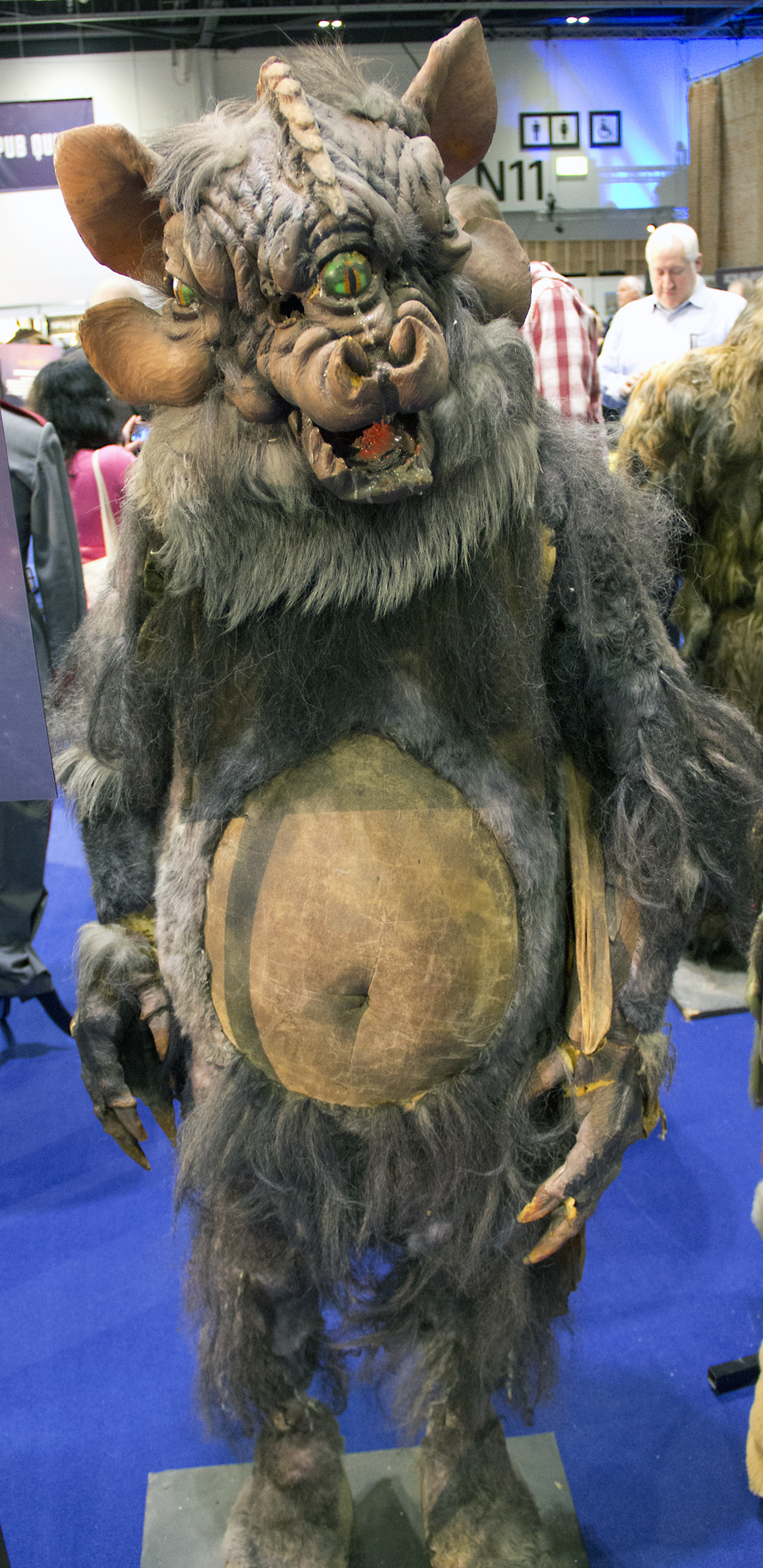
The Tetraps, on display at a 50th Anniversary event

Whilst in flight, the TARDIS is attacked by the Rani, an amoral scientist and renegade Time Lord. The TARDIS crash-lands on the planet Lakertya. On the floor of the console room, the Sixth Doctor regenerates into the Seventh Doctor. In his post-regenerative confusion the Doctor is separated from Mel and tricked into assisting the Rani in her megalomaniac scheme to construct a giant time manipulator.

Lost on the barren surface of the planet, Mel has to avoid the Rani's ingenious traps and her monstrous, bat-like servants, the Tetraps. She joins forces with a rebel Lakertyan, Ikona, desperate to end the Rani's control of his planet. The Doctor must recover his wits in time to avoid becoming a permanent part of the Rani's plan to collect the genius of the greatest scientific minds in the universe, of which she has captured many including Albert Einstein, in order that she can create a time manipulator, which would allow the Rani to control time anywhere in the universe, at the expense of all life on Lakertya.

The Doctor manages to foil her plan and free the Lakertyans of her evil control. The Rani escapes in her TARDIS, but it has been commandeered by the Tetraps, who take her prisoner. The Doctor takes all the captured geniuses on board his TARDIS so that he can return them home.

== Production ==
This story's working title was Strange Matter. The story was initially written for Colin Baker and the Sixth Doctor, with the opening scene, intended to be a depiction of the Judgement of Solomon, dropped to accommodate the regeneration.

Time and the Rani introduced a new title sequence for the show, replacing Sid Sutton's starfield title sequence, which had been in use since The Leisure Hive in 1980. The new titles were created by the graphic designer Oliver Elmes of the independent company CAL Video, and were the first to be realised with CGI. The animated graphics depicted a swirling spiral galaxy, asteroids, the Tardis enclosed within a bubble, a head shot of Sylvester McCoy as the Doctor and a new metallic logo. A new synthesizer arrangement of Ron Grainer's theme music by Keff McCulloch was also introduced.

=== Cast notes ===
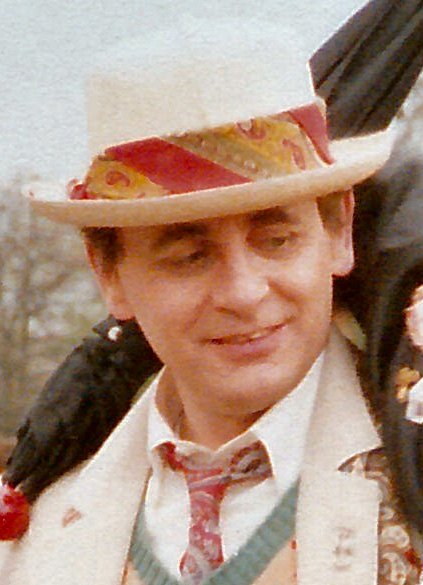
Time and the Rani introduced Sylvester McCoy in the lead role as The Doctor

Wanda Ventham and Donald Pickering previously appeared together in The Faceless Ones. Donald Pickering also appeared in The Keys of Marinus. Wanda Ventham also appeared in Image of the Fendahl. Due to Colin Baker refusing to reprise his role as the Sixth Doctor, Sylvester McCoy donned a wig for the regeneration effect.

== Broadcast and reception ==
Episode	Title	Run time	Original release date	UK viewers (millions)
1	"Part One"	24:44	7 September 1987	5.1
2	"Part Two"	24:36	14 September 1987	4.2
3	"Part Three"	24:23	21 September 1987	4.3
4	"Part Four"	24:38	28 September 1987	4.9

Reviewing Time and the Rani, Tat Wood criticised the story's dialogue and plot, but praised the direction as "visually impressive". A 2014 poll held by Doctor Who Magazine ranked Time and the Rani as the third worst story in the show's run, behind only Fear Her and The Twin Dilemma.

Newly appointed script editor Andrew Cartmel said there were many things he disliked about the script, which he felt lacked depth: "This was a story which wasn't about anything—and, frustratingly, it was Sylvester McCoy's debut." Cartmel also stated that the Bakers' scripts were also disliked by other members of the cast and crew including producer John Nathan-Turner.

== Commercial releases ==
=== In print ===
Time and the Rani
- Author: Pip and Jane Baker
- Series: Doctor Who book: Target novelisations
- Release number: 128 (initial printings erroneously have it numbered 127)
- Publisher: Target Books
- Publication date: December 1987 (Hardback) 5 May 1988 (Paperback)
- ISBN: 0-491-03186-6

A novelisation of this serial, written by Pip and Jane Baker, was published by Target Books in December 1987. The novel features a longer finale for the Sixth Doctor (and reveals that the regeneration into the Seventh Doctor was caused by "tumultuous buffeting" when the Rani attacked the TARDIS), while the Tetraps seem to speak English backwards.

=== Home media ===
Time and the Rani was released on VHS by BBC Worldwide in July 1995. It was released on region 2 DVD on 13 September 2010, and on region 1 DVD on 14 June 2011. This serial was also released as part of the Doctor Who DVD Files in Issue 99 on 17 October 2012.

In June 2021 it was released as part of the Doctor Who: The Collection Season 24 blu-ray box set, which includes an optional extended cut of all four episodes.

=== Soundtrack ===
Doctor Who: Time and the Rani

Soundtrack album by Keff McCulloch
- Released: 24 November 2023
- Genre: Soundtrack
- Length: 76:05
- Label: Silva Screen

Doctor Who soundtrack chronology
Doctor Who: Series 13 – The Specials (2022)	Doctor Who: Time and the Rani (2023)	Doctor Who: Revenge of the Cybermen (2023)

Keff McCulloch's music from this serial was released on CD 24 November 2023.

==== Track listing ====
All tracks are written by Keff McCulloch, except where noted.

Part One
No.	Title	Writer(s)	Length
1.	"The Rani Takes the TARDIS (Sound Effects)"	Dick Mills at the BBC Radiophonic Workshop	0.22
2.	"Leave the Girl, It's the Man I Want"		0.23
3.	"Doctor Who (Opening Theme)"	Ron Grainer, arr. Keff McCulloch	0.54
4.	"Einstein"		0.21
5.	"A Nice Nap"		0.34
6.	"Urak and Ikona"		1.12
7.	"The Death of Sarn"		1.05
8.	"Bull in a Barbershop"		0.24
9.	"Not Your Enemy"		1.52
10.	"The Tetrap Eyrie (1)"		0.46
11.	"Landscape"		0.25
12.	"New Wardrobe"		1.27
13.	"Mel and the Bubble Trap"		1.04

Part Two
No.	Title	Length
14.	"Mel and the Bubble Trap (continued)"	1.33
15.	"The Tetrap Eyrie (2)"	0.44
16.	"Wait Here"	0.56
17.	"Memory Like An Elephant"	1.18
18.	"Faroon, Ikona and the Mourning"	1.34
19.	"Urak Nets The Rani"	1.39
20.	"Pulses"	0.26
21.	"The Rani's TARDIS"	1.03
22.	"You're a Time Lord"	0.39
23.	"She's Coming"	0.29
24.	"Cliffhanger in the Eyrie"	1.30

Part Three
No.	Title	Length
25.	"Doctor on the Loose (Part 1)"	0.55
26.	"Doctor on the Loose (Parts 2-4)"	1.28
27.	"Doctor on the Loose (Part 5 - The Bubble Trap)"	0.33
28.	"Faroon Forlorn / Doctor on the Loose (Part 6)"	0.46
29.	"Future Pleasure"	4.58
30.	"Beez"	0.47
31.	"Hologram Mel"	1.29
32.	"Just the Expert"	0.24
33.	"As Sentimental as He Is"	0.17
34.	"Fixed Trajectory"	0.48
35.	"Second Bluff"	0.47
36.	"All as Planned"	0.20
37.	"The Brain"	2.08

Part Four
No.	Title	Writer(s)	Length
38.	"The Brain (reprise)"		1.19
39.	"Dissidents to Heel"		0.40
40.	"March of the Tetraps / Anklet Death"		1.48
41.	"The Rani Explains"		1.48
42.	"Urak Overhears"		0.27
43.	"Loyhargil (1)"		0.48
44.	"As You Snore So Shall You Sleep"		0.38
45.	"Loyhargil (2)"		0.14
46.	"Where there's a Will"		0.27
47.	"Loyhargil (3)"		0.24
48.	"The Rani Leaves"		0.20
49.	"Undoing The Rani"		2.08
50.	"Fingers Crossed"		0.21
51.	"Not Forgotten"		0.54
52.	"Time and Tide Melts the Snowman"		0.15
53.	"Doctor Who (Closing Theme)"	Ron Grainer, arr. Keff McCulloch	1.13

Bonus Tracks
No.	Title	Writer(s)	Length
54.	"Doctor Who 1987"	Ron Grainer, arr. Keff McCulloch	2.40
55.	"The Death of Sarn (part, alternative version without rattle)"		0.22
56.	"Two “stings” (1m10 and 1m12)"		0.18
57.	"New Wardrobe (original mono mix without overdubs)"		0.57
58.	"New Wardrobe (overdubs)"		0.57
59.	"New Wardrobe (original mono TV mix as used)"		0.58
60.	"She's Coming (unused version 1)"		0.43
61.	"Cliffhanger in the Eyrie (unused version 1)"		1.30
62.	"Cliffhanger in the Eyrie (Part Two Reprise edit)"		1.18
63.	"Future Pleasure (original master)"		4.32
64.	"The Brain (25th Anniversary Album edit)"		3.03
65.	"Doctor Who Theme 1987 (original demo)"	Ron Grainer, arr. Keff McCulloch	2.54
66.	"Doctor Who Opening Title 1987 (original demo)"	Ron Grainer, arr. Keff McCulloch	0.43
67.	"Doctor Who Closing Title 1987 (original demo)"	Ron Grainer, arr. Keff McCulloch	1.16
Total length:			76.05
