= Sara Griffiths =

English actress (born 1968)

- Born: Sara Julie Griffiths; 12 July 1968 (age 57); Sheffield, England
- Occupations: Actress; Presenter; Voiceover; Lecturer; Therapist
- Years active: 1987–present

Sara Griffiths (born 12 July 1968) is an English actress.

== Early life ==
Griffiths was born on 12 July 1968 in Sheffield, England. She trained at The Elmhurst School from 1979 to 1985, taking a drama course with Andrew Neil and Graham Mitchell during 1984/5. Before becoming an actress, Sara started her career as one of the youngest dancers ever in Moulin Rouge in Paris.

== Acting ==
Griffiths' appearances in British television series include The Chief, The Ruth Rendell Mysteries, Van der Valk, Holby City, The Bill, Doctor Who (in the serial Delta and the Bannermen) and Doctors. Her main roles were as Liz Beaufort in Gentlemen and Players and as two characters in soap opera Emmerdale: firstly as Clare Sutcliffe between June 1988 and April 1989 then as Isla Forsyth between October 2005 and November 2006.

At the time of her Doctor Who appearance in 1987, Griffiths became a potential candidate for replacement companion when Bonnie Langford (Mel Bush) left. Ultimately, the companion role was given to Sophie Aldred (Ace). 37 years later, Griffiths returned as the voice of her character (Ray), being a companion to Seventh Doctor Sylvester McCoy in various Big Finish audio dramas.

== Theatre ==
On stage, she appeared in the West End in An Inspector Calls playing Sheila Birling at the Garrick Theatre, spent a year at the Royal National Theatre and performed in numerous productions on tour, abroad and in the UK. One of these was working with Steven Berkoff on Coriolanus in the UK, Japan and Jerusalem. Another memorable performance was portraying the title character of Lady Windermere's Fan at Ipswich's Wolsey Theatre in 1996.

== Voicework ==
Represented by Harvey Voices, Griffiths provided voiceovers for commercials such as Nationwide Building Society, Disney, Twinings Tea, Aquafresh and Colman's. In addition, she narrated documentaries including Me, My Sex and I for the BBC as well as the O Network.

Griffiths regularly read new scripts for the Royal National Theatre Studio and took part in radio plays for BBC Radio 4 e.g. The Decameron by Giovanni Boccaccio and Network by Tony McHale, broadcast as an afternoon play for BBC Radio 4 in January 2012. In 2007, she appeared in the Big Finish Doctor Who play I.D., alongside Sixth Doctor Colin Baker.

== Other work ==
Griffiths has been a presenter on the shopping channel QVC, where she trained other QVC presenters in Germany and Italy. In addition, she is a communication coach, lecturer of drama and examiner for New Era Academy, training people from many industries in both their personal and public communication skills. As a Spiritual Mentor, she founded The Universal Soul Company.

== Personal life ==
While appearing in Emmerdale Farm, Griffiths was in a relationship with co-star Cy Chadwick (who played her onscreen lover Nick Bates). This ended when she moved to London while he was still filming the soap opera in Leeds. After that, the actress dated Joseph Fiennes for six years.
