= Oliver Elmes =

British graphic designer

7th Doctor logo

Oliver Elmes (24 October 1934 – 4 May 2011) was a British graphic designer. He designed a number of logos for the BBC, including Elizabeth R, The Goodies, but is best known for his title designs for The Good Life and the final three years of the original run of Doctor Who, from 1987 to 1989.

Doctor Who producer John Nathan-Turner commissioned Elmes to design a new opening for the show after the announcement that Colin Baker would not be returning to the series. Elmes worked with graphic designer Gareth Edwards from CAL Video to produce the new logo entirely on computer. The new design featured a Big Bang and a purple spiral cosmos, overlaid first with the TARDIS and then by Sylvester McCoy's face. The opening was accompanied with a new version of the theme by Keff McCulloch. The new sequence cost nearly £20,000 and took 3 months to complete. After the series was cancelled, the new logo continued to be used for the Virgin New Adventures until Bad Therapy (1996). It also appeared on some of the final Target Books novelizations, published by Virgin Publishing.

Elmes died on 4 May 2011.
