= Paradise Towers =

145 – Paradise Towers
- Doctor Who serial

Cast
- Doctor: Sylvester McCoy – Seventh Doctor
- Companion: Bonnie Langford – Mel Bush
- Others: Richard Briers – Chief Caretaker / The Great Architect; Clive Merrison – Deputy Chief Caretaker; Elizabeth Spriggs – Tabby; Brenda Bruce – Tilda; Judy Cornwell – Maddy; Howard Cooke – Pex; Julie Brennon – Fire Escape; Annabel Yuresha – Bin Liner; Catherine Cusack – Blue Kang Leader; Astra Sheridan – Yellow Kang; Joseph Young – Young Caretaker; Simon Coady – Video Commentary

Production
- Directed by: Nicholas Mallett
- Written by: Stephen Wyatt
- Script editor: Andrew Cartmel
- Produced by: John Nathan-Turner
- Executive producer: None
- Music by: Keff McCulloch
- Production code: 7E
- Series: Season 24
- Running time: 4 episodes, 25 minutes each
- First broadcast: 5 October 1987
- Last broadcast: 26 October 1987

Chronology
← Preceded by Time and the Rani	Followed by → Delta and the Bannermen

Paradise Towers is the second serial of the 24th season of the British science fiction television series Doctor Who, which was first broadcast in four weekly parts from 5 to 26 October 1987.

In the serial, Kroagnon, the incorporeal architect of the giant residential building Paradise Towers, takes over the body of the Chief Caretaker (Richard Briers) so he can kill everyone in the Towers.

== Plot ==
The Seventh Doctor and Mel, looking for a swimming pool, land in Paradise Towers, a luxurious 22nd-century high-rise apartment building which has now fallen into disrepair and chaos. It is divided between the Caretakers who maintain the building and roaming gangs of young girls called Kangs, grouped in colour theme; the Doctor and Mel encounter the Red Kangs.

The Chief sends a squad of Caretakers to arrest the Red Kangs and in the ensuing confusion the Doctor is split from Mel and captured by the Caretakers. Mel meanwhile heads off to an apartment in which two elderly residents ("rezzies") live. Tilda and Tabby explain that all the able-bodied residents left the Towers to fight a war, leaving behind only children and the elderly. The only other man still loose in the Towers is Pex, a would-be hero, who appoints himself Mel's guardian.

At the Caretaker control centre, the Doctor meets the Chief Caretaker, who greets him as the Great Architect Kroagnon, designer of Paradise Towers, and orders him killed. The Doctor cites an imaginary rule from the Caretakers' manual, confusing them enough to make his escape. Mel and Pex meanwhile are captured by a party of Blue Kangs who reveal to Mel that Pex is a coward and only survived by fleeing and hiding.

The Doctor is reunited with the Red Kangs who explain that Kangs and Caretakers have been disappearing in ever greater numbers. Meanwhile, Mel has visited Tilda and Tabby again and soon finds herself under threat when it emerges they are cannibals and plan to eat her. After escaping, both Tabby and Tilda are killed by a mechanical claw from their waste disposal unit.

The Chief Caretaker has been allowing the robotic cleaners to kill anybody they encounter, and after reading a sales brochure for the Towers, the Doctor remembers that Kroagnon also designed "Miracle City" - a cutting-edge development which used its automation to kill its occupants. The Doctor surmises that Kroagnon inhabits Paradise Towers in the basement, and thinks that inhabitants ruin his creations, so kills them off whenever possible.

Mel and Pex finally find the swimming pool. When Mel takes a dip in the pool, she is attacked by a crablike robot. Pex's cowardice prevents him from rescuing Mel, and she has to save herself which embarrasses Pex. Mel leaves to find the Doctor, and Pex trails behind her.

The Blue Kangs reach the Red Kangs' base, and nearly come to blows, but the Doctor persuades them that their game is over, and they must work together in order to defeat Kroagnon. As the Cleaners begin killing everybody, the surviving Rezzies and caretakers join forces with the Doctor and the Kangs to defeat Kroagnon. They plan to lure Kroagnon (now inhabiting the body of the Chief Caretaker) into a booby trapped room, but the plan fails. Pex sacrifices himself to drag the Chief into the trap.

After a period of reflection and Pex's funeral, the Doctor and Mel leave, trusting the remaining Kangs, Rezzies, and Caretakers to build a better society. As the TARDIS dematerialises, a new piece of Kang graffiti is revealed – "Pex Lives".

== Production ==
Episode	Title	Run time	Original release date	UK viewers (millions)
1	"Part One"	24:33	5 October 1987	4.5
2	"Part Two"	24:39	12 October 1987	5.2
3	"Part Three"	24:30	19 October 1987	5.0
4	"Part Four"	24:21	26 October 1987	5.0

Working titles for this story included The Paradise Tower. The 1975 J. G. Ballard novel High-Rise has been cited as an influence.

The music was originally meant to be provided by a member of the BBC Radiophonic Workshop, but producer John Nathan-Turner had decided that the incidental music no longer needed to be produced in-house. Instead, freelance composer David Snell was hired to provide the score, but Nathan-Turner terminated the commission very late in the production as he was unsatisfied with the way the score was done. Snell's original score was kept, albeit in lower quality, and is available on the DVD release of the story as an alternative soundtrack. Keff McCulloch provided the final score at short notice. Originally only booked to score Time and the Rani and Delta and the Bannermen for Season 24, he composed the replacement score to Paradise Towers in a week.

The swimming pool scene involving Mel and a pool-cleaning robot was filmed at Elmswell House near Chalfont St. Giles.

=== Cast notes ===
Nisha Nayar, an uncredited extra playing one of the Red Kangs, later appeared in a more substantial speaking part as the Female Programmer in the 2005 two-part story "Bad Wolf" and "The Parting of the Ways". This made her the second performer to appear in both the classic and new series of Doctor Who.

Julie Brennon, who played Fire Escape, was married at the time to Mark Strickson, who had been the Fifth Doctor's companion Vislor Turlough. Richard Briers – The Chief Caretaker – later appears in the Torchwood episode "A Day in the Death" as Henry Parker. See also Celebrity appearances in Doctor Who. Clive Merrison previously played Jim Callum in The Tomb of the Cybermen.

According to the extensive production documentation released with the 2021 Blu-ray box set edition of the series, both Rosemary Leach and Frances Cuka were offered the role of Maddy (Cuka being confirmed before withdrawing), Philip Jackson and later Roger Daltrey were both offered the role of the Deputy Chief Caretaker and Ronald Lacey, Ian Richardson, Denis Quilley and Edward Hardwicke were all formally offered the role of the Chief Caretaker.

== Reception ==
In a 2007 comedy article, Digital Spy named Paradise Towers Episode 4 as one of the reasons for swimming pool phobia.

Richard Briers' performance has attracted considerable criticism. In the DVD special features, it is mentioned that both John Nathan-Turner and Andrew Cartmel were concerned about his performance during the recording of scenes later in the story where his character's body is inhabited by Kroagnon, and Briers admits he ignored directions to tone it down. Patrick Mulkern, writing for Radio Times, described Briers' performance as a "career low", stating Briers is "shockingly bad in this story...there's no escaping the fact that the Chief Caretaker, the key baddie in Paradise Towers, is just Richard Briers in a silly cap, silly moustache, putting on a silly voice. Mugging for England. Sending up Doctor Who in a horribly misjudged, self-indulgent performance, especially after the Caretaker has been 'zombified' by the Great Architect. Briers growls and clomps about like an embarrassing dad playing the Bogeyman. It plunges an already teetering production into the abyss."

A critical analysis of the story was published as part of the Black Archive series of books from Obverse Books. The book won the Sir Julius Vogel Award for Best Professional Publication in 2023.

== Commercial releases ==
=== In print ===
Paradise Towers
- Author: Stephen Wyatt
- Cover artist: Alister Pearson
- Series: Doctor Who book: Target novelisations
- Release number: 134
- Publisher: Target Books
- Publication date: 1 December 1988
- ISBN: 0-426-20330-5

A novelisation of this serial, written by Stephen Wyatt, was published by Target Books in December 1988. It reveals that the Blue Kang Leader is named Drinking Fountain.

In April 2012, an audiobook of the novelisation was released, read by Bonnie Langford.

=== Home media ===
Paradise Towers was released on VHS in October 1995. It was released on DVD 18 July 2011. This serial was also released as part of the Doctor Who DVD Files in Issue 106 on 23 January 2013.

In June 2021 it was released as part of the Doctor Who: The Collection Season 24 blu-ray box set, which includes an optional extended cut of all four episodes.

=== Licensed sequels ===
Cutaway Comics, with the graphic novel Paradise Towers, and Obverse Books with the short story collections Build High for Happiness and Ice Hot have both published licensed sequels to the story, in each case with involvement from creator Stephen Wyatt. Wyatt also contributed a new interview on the story to the same company's Black Archive on the serial.
