= Kerala Farmers Federation =

Kerala Farmers Federation (KeFF) is a non-profit agricultural organization established in 2017. It consists of over 670,000 farmers and 1,400,000 workers, and spreads awareness about farmer rights, sustainable farming practices, trade agreements and laws concerning farming and holding of land.
