= Pip and Jane Baker =

British television writer duo

- The Bakers being interviewed on Open Air in 1986
- Born: 3 January 1929 (Pip); 30 December 1924 (Jane); United Kingdom (Pip, Jane)
- Died: 14 April 2020 (aged 91) (Pip); 29 August 2014 (aged 89) (Jane); United Kingdom (Pip, Jane)
- Occupations: Television writers and screenwriters
- Years active: 1961–2000
- Known for: Doctor Who; Watt on Earth

Ernest Alexander "Pip" Baker (3 January 1929 – 14 April 2020) and Iris E. E. "Jane" Baker (30 December 1924 – 29 August 2014), professionally known as Pip and Jane Baker, were an English husband-and-wife team of television writers known mainly for their contributions to the BBC science-fiction series Doctor Who.

The Bakers scripted or contributed to four serials for the programme in the 1980s: The Mark of the Rani (1985), The Trial of a Time Lord (1986), Parts 9–12 and 14 (also known as Terror of the Vervoids and The Ultimate Foe respectively); and Time and the Rani (1987). They also wrote novelisations of these stories, as well as a Make Your Own Adventure With Doctor Who (Find Your Fate With Doctor Who in the United States) gamebook titled Race Against Time. Pip and Jane's audio story The Rani Reaps the Whirlwind featured the return of The Rani and was released in 2000.

== Other work ==
Their play A Moment of Blindness was adapted into the film The Third Alibi (1961). They worked on several other films in the 1960s including Night of the Big Heat (1967) and Captain Nemo and the Underwater City (1969). They also wrote four episodes of the TV series The Pursuers starring Louis Hayward.

From the mid-1970s, they worked more in television, including the six-part children's thriller Circus. They scripted the episode "A Matter of Balance" (1976) for Gerry Anderson's TV series Space: 1999.

In the 1990s, they created and wrote the CBBC series Watt on Earth, the eponymous Watt being an alien who is trapped on Earth.

== Deaths ==
Jane Baker died on 29 August 2014, at the age of 89. Pip Baker died on 14 April 2020, at the age of 91.
