= The Mark of the Rani =

139 – The Mark of The Rani
- Doctor Who serial
- Anthony Ainley as The Master and Kate O'Mara as The Rani

Cast
- Doctor: Colin Baker – Sixth Doctor
- Companion: Nicola Bryant – Peri Brown
- Others: Anthony Ainley – The Master; Kate O'Mara – The Rani; Terence Alexander – Lord Ravensworth; Gawn Grainger – George Stephenson; Peter Childs – Jack Ward; Gary Cady – Luke Ward; William Ilkley – Tim Bass; Hus Levent – Edwin Green; Kevin White – Sam Rudge; Martyn Whitby – Drayman; Sarah James, Cordelia Ditton – Women; Richard Steele – Guard

Production
- Directed by: Sarah Hellings
- Written by: Pip and Jane Baker
- Script editor: Eric Saward
- Produced by: John Nathan-Turner
- Executive producer: None
- Music by: Jonathan Gibbs
- Production code: 6X
- Series: Season 22
- Running time: 2 episodes, 45 minutes each
- First broadcast: 2 February 1985
- Last broadcast: 9 February 1985

Chronology
← Preceded by Vengeance on Varos	Followed by → The Two Doctors

The Mark of The Rani is the third serial of the 22nd season of the British science fiction television series Doctor Who, which was first broadcast in two weekly parts on BBC1 on 2 and 9 February 1985.

The serial is set in the mining village of Killingworth in North East England in the 19th century. In the serial, the renegade Time Lords The Rani (Kate O'Mara) and The Master (Anthony Ainley) team up to take a chemical from humans' brains for use in the Rani's experiments, with the Master also intending to use the brightest minds of the Industrial Revolution to make the Earth a base for himself.

== Plot ==
When the Sixth Doctor and Peri arrive in the 19th-century mining town of Killingworth, they encounter a group of rampaging miners attacking people and destroying machinery. The Doctor discovers two renegade Time Lords, The Master and The Rani. The Rani's experiments on the planet of Miasimia Goria for which she rules, have left its inhabitants unable to sleep. In an attempt to fix the problem, she has begun harvesting brain fluid from the Killingworth miners hoping to synthesize it back on Miasimia Goria. The Master wants to use the finest brains of the Industrial Revolution to help speed up Earth's development and use the planet as a powerbase, coercing The Rani to assist him.

The Doctor sneaks into the Rani's TARDIS, whose control room contains jars of preserved dinosaur embryos, and overhears Rani confessing to have laid landmines in nearby Redfern Dell. Simultaneously, Peri is using her botanical knowledge to make a sleeping draught for the afflicted miners, but her quest for herbs leads her to Redfern Dell. The Doctor then surprises the Master and the Rani, who are lurking at the edge of the Dell, and takes them prisoner with the Master's own Tissue Compression Eliminator. They attempt to flee in The Rani's TARDIS, but the Doctor has sabotaged the navigational system and velocity regulator, and the ship starts heading out of control. In the destabilised condition, one of the jars containing an embryo Tyrannosaurus Rex falls to the floor and the creature begins to grow. The Master and the Rani are "stuck" against one of the walls of the Rani's TARDIS due to the speed at which they are travelling and are helplessly at the mercy of the rapidly aging immature Tyrannosaurus.

The Doctor and Peri return the stolen brain fluid to prominent local citizens Lord Ravensworth and George Stephenson with instructions to administer it to the affected miners.

== Production ==
The working titles for this story were Too Clever By Far and Enter The Rani.

The music score for this story was provided by composer Jonathan Gibbs. John Lewis was originally hired to compose the score, but had only completed the first episode when a sudden onset of illness – which ultimately resulted in his death – prevented him from finishing the work and forced the production team to give the assignment to Gibbs. Lewis' score for the first episode was included on the DVD release.

The serial featured extensive location filming at the Blists Hill Victorian Town and the Coalport China Museum, operated by the Ironbridge Gorge Museum Trust. Both episodes included in the credits: "The BBC wish to acknowledge the cooperation of the Ironbridge Gorge Museum." This was the first story since Season 3's The Gunfighters to feature specific historical characters, in this case landowner Lord Ravensworth and his employee George Stephenson.

== Broadcast and reception ==
Episode	Title	Run time	Original release date	UK viewers (millions)
1	"Part One"	45:01	2 February 1985	6.3
2	"Part Two"	44:32	9 February 1985	7.3

Writing for Radio Times, Mark Braxton awarded the serial three stars out of five, describing it as "a refreshing, earthbound delight in an undistinguished era of offworld futurama". He praised the location filming, the scenes between the Doctor, the Master and the Rani, and aspects of the design, such as the Rani's TARDIS, which he said was "absolutely gorgeous, quite the best piece of design in the show for an age". However, he characterized the dialogue as "a mixture of wonderful and woeful", questioned the low-key presence of the historical characters, the "shaky" period grasp and wandering North East accents, and concluded the serial was "a story of considerable interest. But little flair or sizzle".

Paul Cornell, Martin Day and Keith Topping, authors of The Discontinuity Guide, considered the story's dialogue to be overblown, although the concepts were interesting. They thought the direction and music of the serial were "superb", highlighting the scene where the Doctor inspected the inside of the Rani's TARDIS as "one of the few great scenes of this era". They concluded the serial was "altogether rather more impressive than its reputation." In Doctor Who: The Complete Guide, Mark Campbell awarded The Mark of the Rani four out of ten, describing it as "excitingly directed by newcomer Sarah Hellings" but "nonetheless a meandering story with some very stupid moments and the inclusion of one too many pantomime villains."

== Commercial releases ==
=== In print ===
The Mark of the Rani
- Author: Pip and Jane Baker
- Cover artist: Andrew Skilleter
- Series: Doctor Who book: Target novelisations
- Release number: 107
- Publisher: Target Books
- Publication date: January 1986 (Hardback) 12 June 1986 (Paperback)
- ISBN: 0-426-20232-5

A novelisation of this serial, written by Pip and Jane Baker, was published by Target Books in January 1986.

=== Home media ===
The Mark of the Rani was released on VHS in July 1995. It was released as a Region 2 DVD on 4 September 2006. As of 11 August 2008, this serial has been released for sale on iTunes. This serial was also released as part of the Doctor Who DVD Files in issue 63 on 1 June 2011.

It was released as part of the ‘Doctor Who The Collection: Season 22’ blu-ray box set on 20 June 2022.
