= Delta and the Bannermen =

146 – Delta and the Bannermen
- Doctor Who serial

Cast
- Doctor: Sylvester McCoy – Seventh Doctor
- Companion: Bonnie Langford – Mel Bush
- Others: Don Henderson – Gavrok; Belinda Mayne – Delta; Richard Davies – Burton; Stubby Kaye – Weismuller; Morgan Deare – Hawk; David Kinder – Billy; Martyn Geraint – Vinny; Sara Griffiths – Ray; Hugh Lloyd – Goronwy; Ken Dodd – Tollmaster; Brian Hibbard – Keillor; Johnny Dennis – Murray; Leslie Meadows – Adlon; Anita Graham – Bollitt; Clive Condon – Callon; Richard Mitchley – Arrex; Tim Scott – Chima; Jessica McGough, Amy Osborn – Young Chimeron; Laura Collins, Carley Joseph – Chimeron Princess; Robin Aspland, Keff McCulloch, Justin Myers, Ralph Salmins – The Lorells; Tracey Wilson, Jodie Wilson – Vocalists

Production
- Directed by: Chris Clough
- Written by: Malcolm Kohll
- Script editor: Andrew Cartmel
- Produced by: John Nathan-Turner
- Music by: Keff McCulloch
- Production code: 7F
- Series: Season 24
- Running time: 3 episodes, 25 minutes each
- First broadcast: 2 November 1987
- Last broadcast: 16 November 1987

Chronology
← Preceded by Paradise Towers	Followed by → Dragonfire

Delta and the Bannermen is the third serial of the 24th season of the British science fiction television series Doctor Who, which was first broadcast in three weekly parts from 2 to 16 November 1987.

In the serial, aliens called the Bannermen track down the Chimeron Queen Delta (Belinda Mayne) to a Welsh holiday camp in 1959 so they can kill her.

== Plot ==
On an alien planet the genocide of the Chimeron by the merciless Bannermen led by Gavrok is almost complete. The last survivor, Chimeron Queen Delta, escapes clutching her egg. She reaches a space tollport where the Navarinos, a race of shape-changing tourist aliens, are planning a visit to Disneyland on the planet Earth in 1959, in a spaceship disguised as an old holiday bus. She stows aboard, meeting Mel, while the Seventh Doctor follows in the TARDIS. The holiday vehicle collides with an Earth satellite and is diverted off course, landing at a holiday camp in South Wales, led by camp director Burton. Delta's egg hatches into a bright green baby that starts to grow at a startling rate. The Chimeron Queen supports this development with the equivalent of royal jelly given to bees.

Delta captures the heart of Billy, the camp's mechanic, to the chagrin of Ray, who loves Billy herself. Ray confides her situation to the Doctor, and they stumble across a bounty hunter making contact with the Bannermen to tell them of the Chimeron's whereabouts. Gavrok and his troops soon arrive. Delta and Billy head off for a picnic while the Doctor busies himself coordinating things back at the camp. Meanwhile, the Bannermen have destroyed the Navarino bus with all its passengers.

Two American CIA agents, Hawk and Weismuller, appear on the scene, tracking the missing satellite. Gavrok booby-traps the TARDIS in an attempt to kill the Doctor. A battle ensues with Gavrok and his Bannermen against the Doctor and his crew: Ray & Billy, Goronwy, Mr. Burton and the two CIA agents. The Bannermen are foiled by honey, Goronwy's bees and finally by the amplified scream of the Chimeron child Princess—a sound which is painful to Bannermen.

Goronwy explains to Billy the purpose of royal jelly in the lifecycle of the honeybee, provoking the mechanic to consume Delta's equivalent that she has been feeding her daughter in the hope of metamorphosing into a Chimeron.

As Gavrok and the Bannermen attack Shangri-La, the amplified scream of the Chimeron princess traumatises the attackers, including Gavrok, who becomes so stunned that he falls into the booby-trap he placed on the TARDIS and is killed. Delta and Billy leave together with the child, the two agents watch on with surprise and Goronwy winks knowingly as the Doctor and Mel slip away.

== Production ==
=== Pre-production ===
The story was produced under the name Flight of the Chimeron. The BBC's Doctor Who episode guide lists Echo & the Bunnymen among the story's "roots".

The character Ray was created as a potential new companion for the Doctor, as Bonnie Langford was due to leave the series. In the following serial, Dragonfire, the character of Ace was introduced and ultimately chosen to continue over Ray.

=== Filming and post-production ===
The scenes at the Shangri-La holiday camp were shot on location at Butlin's Barry Island in Wales. Notably, Richard Davies, as Mr Burton, speaks Welsh on several occasions.

The soundtrack of this serial contained numerous recognisable pop songs; all were re-recorded by "The Lorells", a fictional group created by the show's incidental music composer Keff McCulloch. The songs featured in the serial were "Rock Around the Clock"; "Singing the Blues"; "Why Do Fools Fall in Love"; "Mr. Sandman"; "Goodnite, Sweetheart, Goodnite"; "That'll Be the Day"; "Only You"; "Lollipop"; "Who's Sorry Now?" and "Happy Days Are Here Again".

McCoy can be seen wearing his glasses in certain long shots of him riding a motorcycle. The motorbike was made by British manufacturer Vincent Motorcycles. The guitar seen at the end of the story is a Squier Stratocaster by Fender, although the model was not available at the time the story was set.

=== Cast notes ===
The serial features guest appearances by Ken Dodd, Don Henderson, Hugh Lloyd, Morgan Deare, Richard Davies, and American stage and screen actor Stubby Kaye. Morgan Deare later played Senator Waldo Pickering in the audio play Minuet in Hell and Arthur in the new series episode "Rosa". Dodd's role of the tollmaster was originally offered to Bob Monkhouse and Christopher Biggins. According to McCoy, Dodd was uncertain of his performance during filming.

Lynn Gardner was cast as Ray but was hospitalised while practising riding a Vespa for the role. Sara Griffiths took over as Ray in Delta and the Bannermen, while Gardner was cast in a voiceover role for the following story, Dragonfire.

== Broadcast and reception ==
Episode	Title	Run time	Original release date	UK viewers (millions)
1	"Part One"	24:47	2 November 1987	5.3
2	"Part Two"	24:23	9 November 1987	5.1
3	"Part Three"	24:22	16 November 1987	5.4

Simon Brew of Den of Geek thought the story was "fun nonsense." Paul Cornell, Martin Day and Keith Topping enjoyed the serial, describing it as "confident, slick, and hugely enjoyable from beginning to end". They praised Bonnie Langford's performance, found Ken Dodd to be "OK" but thought Don Henderson played it too straight.

David J. Howe and Stephen James Walker found the serial to be even more whimsical than the preceding story but more successful, believing it was "all in all, a highly enjoyable romp." For Radio Times, Mark Braxton awarded it three stars out of five, declaring, "It's mad as cheese and about as scary as an episode of Play Away. It doesn't feel like Doctor Who for a second. But just once in a while the show can afford to go mad."

In 2015, Steven Moffat endorsed the fan theory that Goronwy is a future incarnation of the Doctor, and said that the idea fit well with the Doctor's line about retiring to become a beekeeper in "The Name of the Doctor".

== Commercial releases ==
=== In print ===
Delta and the Bannermen
- Author: Malcolm Kohll
- Cover artist: Alister Pearson
- Series: Doctor Who book: Target novelisations
- Release number: 135
- Publisher: Target Books
- Publication date: 19 January 1989
- ISBN: 0-426-20333-X

A novelisation of this serial, written by Malcolm Kohll, was published by Target Books in January 1989. The novelisation provides an explanation for why the genocide of the Chimeron race is taking place; the Bannerman have polluted the atmosphere and rivers of their own home planet, so they are attempting to seize the Chimeron's homeworld for themselves.

It was released on audiobook, read by Bonnie Langford.

=== Home media ===
Delta and the Bannermen was released on VHS in March 2001 in the UK and June 2002 in North America, but music clearance issues prevented the release of the serial in Australia. A DVD edition was released in the UK on 22 June 2009. This serial was also released as part of the Doctor Who DVD Files in issue 62 on 18 May 2011.

In June 2021 it was released as part of the Doctor Who: The Collection Season 24 Blu-ray box set, which includes an optional extended cut of all three episodes.

== See also ==
- List of guest appearances in Doctor Who
