= Dragonfire (Doctor Who) =

147 (Note: From the Doctor Who Magazine series overview, in issue 407 (pp26-29). The Discontinuity Guide, which counts the four segments of The Trial of a Time Lord as four separate stories and also counts the unbroadcast serial Shada, lists this story as number 151. Region 1 DVD releases follow The Discontinuity Guide numbering system. This story was promoted on its original transmission by BBC1 and the Radio Times as the 150th Doctor Who story.) – Dragonfire
- Doctor Who serial

Cast
- Doctor: Sylvester McCoy – Seventh Doctor
- Companions: Bonnie Langford – Mel Bush; Sophie Aldred – Ace
- Others: Tony Selby – Sabalom Glitz; Edward Peel – Kane; Patricia Quinn – Belazs; Tony Osoba – Kracauer; Stephanie Fayerman – McLuhan; Stuart Organ – Bazin; Chris MacDonnell – Arnheim; Nigel Miles-Thomas – Pudovkin; Sean Blowers – Zed; Ian MacKenzie – Anderson; Shirin Taylor – Customer; Miranda Borman – Stellar; Leslie Meadows – The Creature; Daphne Oxenford – Archivist; Lynn Gardner – Announcer

Production
- Directed by: Chris Clough
- Written by: Ian Briggs
- Script editor: Andrew Cartmel
- Produced by: John Nathan-Turner
- Music by: Dominic Glynn
- Production code: 7G
- Series: Season 24
- Running time: 3 episodes, 25 minutes each
- First broadcast: 23 November 1987
- Last broadcast: 7 December 1987

Chronology
← Preceded by Delta and the Bannermen	Followed by → Remembrance of the Daleks

Dragonfire is the fourth and final serial of the 24th season of the British science fiction television series Doctor Who, which was first broadcast in three weekly parts from 23 November to 7 December 1987. This serial marked the departure of Bonnie Langford as Mel Bush and the introduction of Sophie Aldred as companion Ace.

In the serial, the criminal Kane (Edward Peel), exiled to the planet Svartos three thousand years ago, seeks to find the power source for his prison ship, which has since become a trading colony called Iceworld, so he can use it to return to his home planet.

== Plot ==
The Seventh Doctor and Mel arrive at the trading colony Iceworld on the dark side of the planet Svartos. They soon run into Sabalom Glitz, who is on Svartos to work off a debt that he owes to the crime lord Kane, and is preparing to explore the depths of Svartos to locate a treasure reportedly protected by a dragon, aided by a map given to him by Kane; in exchange, Kane will return Glitz's ship, the Nosferatu, and clear him of his debts. The Doctor and Mel offer to help, but Glitz asserts the expedition is too dangerous for Mel, and she stays behind at a local diner. She befriends Ace, a young woman who turns out to have actually come from 20th-century Earth, propelled forward in time when a mysterious time storm appeared in her bedroom while she was trying to experiment with "Nitro-9", an explosive of her own creation. The two eventually become weary of waiting and follow the Doctor and Glitz.

Meanwhile, the Doctor and Glitz follow Glitz's map, unaware that Kane has implanted a tracking and listening device into it. Kane controls a large number of beings that had been unable to repay their debts, turned into cold-proof henchmen and their memories wiped by Kane's touch. Kane has a number of these follow the Doctor and Glitz so as to grab the treasure once it is found. The Doctor and Glitz eventually encounter the "dragon", which turns out to be a biomechanoid that can shoot lasers from its eyes. When Mel and Ace arrive and are pursued by Kane's men, the "dragon" helps to protect the two and defeat the men. The "dragon" leads the four to a control room where it plays a holographic message. The message explains that Kane is one half of the Kane-Xana criminal gang from the planet Proamon. They were chased down by authorities, and Xana, Kane's lover, killed herself in the process, while Kane was exiled to Svartos. The message continues that the Iceworld spaceport is really a giant spacecraft, whose power source lies in the head of the being, and Kane seeks this as to be able to escape Svartos. The Doctor suspects Kane must have been trapped here for millennia.

Kane, overhearing this, sends more of his forces to seize the head, while causing chaos among the spaceport, including destroying the Nosferatu with numerous escaping passengers aboard. Kane's men succeed in decapitating the "dragon" before they are killed, and Kane uses a communicator to tell the Doctor and the others to bring him the head. The Doctor does so, accompanied by his allies. Kane uses the head to initiate Iceworld's engines and it detaches itself from the planet. Kane attempts to set course to Proamon, but finds the computers unable to do so; the Doctor explains that Proamon was destroyed a thousand years after Kane was exiled on Svartos when the sun it was orbiting went supernova. Broken by this revelation, Kane commits suicide by purposely allowing his body to be exposed to the light of a nearby star, which causes him to melt.

As order is restored on Iceworld, Glitz declares himself owner of the vessel, and renames it Nosferatu II. Mel decides to stay with Glitz, while the Doctor offers to take Ace home to Perivale via the "scenic route".

== Production ==
Working titles for this story included Absolute Zero, The Pyramid's Treasure and Pyramid in Space. In one scene, the Doctor distracts a guard by engaging him in a philosophical conversation. One of the guard's lines, about the "semiotic thickness of a performed text", is a quotation from Doctor Who: The Unfolding Text, a 1983 media studies volume by John Tulloch and Manuel Alvarado. Story editor Andrew Cartmel had suggested that writers read The Unfolding Text to familiarise themselves with Doctor Who and its history, which inspired Ian Briggs to quote the academic text in his script, in a playful self-reference.

The literal cliffhanger at the end of episode 1 in which the Doctor lowers himself over a guard rail to dangle over an abyss from his umbrella for no apparent reason comes under frequent criticism for its seeming absurdity. As scripted, the Doctor did have a logical motivation for his actions. According to Cartmel in a later interview, the passage leading to the cliff was meant to be a dead end, leaving the Doctor no option but to scale the cliff face. As shot, however, this reasoning became unclear. This original intention is reinforced in the next episode when Mel and Ace contemplate the same climb.

For the effects shot of Kane's death, a wax bust of Edward Peel's screaming face was made and filmed being melted down to a skull within, this footage being sped up to achieve the effect. Though this is very similar to the death of Toht in Raiders of the Lost Ark, for the family audience of Doctor Who, the colour red was carefully avoided in the bust. Ronald Lacey, who had portrayed Toht in the film, was director Chris Clough's first choice to play Kane, but was unavailable. John Alderton and David Jason were also considered for the part of Kane, but neither were available for the role.

== Broadcast and reception ==
Episode	Title	Run time	Original release date	UK viewers (millions)
1	"Part One"	24:01	23 November 1987	5.5
2	"Part Two"	24:40	30 November 1987	5.0
3	"Part Three"	24:26	7 December 1987	4.7

This story was promoted on its original transmission by BBC1 and the Radio Times as the 150th Doctor Who story.

On UK Gold (now known as Gold) in 2003 to celebrate the 40th anniversary of Doctor Who, over a weekend DrWho@40weekend was shown which consisted of the best serials of each Doctor voted by the viewing public. Dragonfire was the serial chosen as the best Seventh Doctor serial. DrWho@40weekend also included interviews with the cast and crew of the series overall. The Doctor Who Appreciation Society voted the serial to be the best one of its season.

Paul Cornell, Martin Day and Keith Topping said the serial was "an interesting attempt to do what Doctor Who does best: mix monsters with semiotics and philosophy. It doesn't quite come off, but it's a very useful launch vehicle for Ace (despite some overdone dialogue)." David J. Howe and Stephen James Walker were critical of the cliffhanger end to episode one, "which must surely be the most ludicrous ever presented in Doctor Who." They conceded, however, that "Dragonfire actually succeeds in a great many respects. One of the principal reasons for this is that all the cast seem to take their parts seriously."

== Commercial releases ==
=== In print ===
Dragonfire
- Author: Ian Briggs
- Cover artist: Alister Pearson
- Series: Doctor Who book: Target novelisations
- Release number: 137
- Publisher: Target Books
- Publication date: 16 March 1989
- ISBN: 0-426-20322-4

A novelisation of this serial, written by Ian Briggs, was published by Target Books in March 1989.

=== Home media ===
Dragonfire was released on VHS on 7 February 1994, alongside the Tom Baker story Planet of Evil. It was released on DVD on 7 May 2012, coupled with The Happiness Patrol as part of the "Ace Adventures" box set. This serial was also released as part of the Doctor Who DVD Files in Issue 123 on 18 September 2013.

In June 2021 it was released as part of the Doctor Who: The Collection Season 24 blu-ray box set, which includes an optional extended cut of all three episodes.
