= Keff McCulloch =

British composer (born 1954)

- Born: Kenneth Norman Scott McCulloch; 8 July 1954 (age 72); Fulham, London, England
- Occupation: Composer
- Spouse(s): Tracey Wilson (m. 1990, divorced) Lynda Shephard

Keff McCulloch (born 8 July 1954) is an English composer best known for his electronic music for Doctor Who in the late 1980s.

In 1987, he was employed by producer John Nathan-Turner to arrange the Doctor Who theme music for the Seventh Doctor, Sylvester McCoy. The theme, drawing on the original composed by Ron Grainer and arranged by Delia Derbyshire, was used for three years until the series was cancelled by the BBC in 1989. The new theme music was accompanied by new titles and logo.

McCulloch also contributed incidental music scores to six stories during the McCoy era, namely: Time and the Rani; Paradise Towers; Delta and the Bannermen; Remembrance of the Daleks; Silver Nemesis; Battlefield; and also the later Dimensions in Time and Shada. McCulloch also played a role on screen as one of the Lorells (a backing group) in Delta and the Bannermen (1987).

Alongside his work on Doctor Who, McCulloch was a musician and sound engineer, touring with many bands and engineering and producing singles and albums for artistes including Acker Bilk, Johnny Logan and Russ Abbot. He also composed and recorded the incidental music for the video release of the film White Mischief.
