= Mel Bush =

Fictional character from Doctor Who

- Doctor Who character
- Bonnie Langford as Mel, in a promotional still from Terror of the Vervoids (1986)
- First appearance: The Trial of a Time Lord: Terror of the Vervoids (1986)
- Last appearance: The Reality War (2025)
- Portrayed by: Bonnie Langford
- Duration: 1986–1987, 1993, 2022–2025

In-universe information
- Full name: Melanie Bush
- Nickname: Mel
- Species: Human
- Occupation: Computer programmer
- Affiliation: Sixth Doctor; Seventh Doctor; Fourteenth Doctor; Fifteenth Doctor; UNIT
- Origin: Pease Pottage, West Sussex, England
- Home: Earth

Melanie "Mel" Bush is a fictional character played by Bonnie Langford in the long-running British science fiction television series Doctor Who. Mel is a computer programmer from the 20th century who is a companion of the Sixth and Seventh Doctors, first appearing on-screen when the Sixth Doctor showed an adventure with her to the Time Lords in order to prove that he would become a better person in the future. Following this, she is shown accompanying the Doctor as a companion, with no further explanation given as to how she met the Doctor.

Despite initial plans for the character's meeting with the Sixth Doctor to be depicted on-screen, the firing of Sixth Doctor actor Colin Baker at the end of 1986 made this unable to happen. Due to changes in script production, Mel's character was altered to adapt to whatever script she was in, resulting in a lack of a character arc. Langford departed the role of Mel in 1987's Dragonfire; following this, Langford reprised the role of Mel in several audio drama productions produced by Big Finish Productions and made a cameo appearance in the 2022 serial "The Power of the Doctor." Mel went on to appear in a recurring role in following episodes of the series, where the character's backstory and personality were fleshed out in these episodes in greater depth than in her prior appearances.

Mel was unpopular in her original appearances due to appearing as a thinly characterized stereotype to audiences. Aspects of her portrayal have been praised, and further reappearances of the character following her departure from the series have been highlighted for broadening the character's depth.

== Character biography ==
Mel is an orphaned computer programmer from the 20th century who originates from the village of Pease Pottage in West Sussex, England. She has an eidetic memory, and a cheery, optimistic personality. She is a health enthusiast and a vegetarian, often encouraging the slightly portly Sixth Doctor to exercise more and drink carrot juice. Mel first appears in the serial Terror of the Vervoids, part of the 14-part story The Trial of a Time Lord. She is called to the Sixth Doctor's (Colin Baker) defence during his trial by his people, the Time Lords. She becomes a companion of the Doctor at a point in the future, with the Doctor displaying an adventure with Mel to show the Time Lords that he would become a better person.

Mel is later seen travelling with the Doctor following this episode, and her first meeting with the Doctor is never elaborated upon within the show itself. She appears in six stories following her debut, eventually departing the series in the episode Dragonfire (1987) alongside the recurring character Sabalom Glitz (Tony Selby). Following this, Mel appears in the 1993 charity episode Dimensions in Time, though the episode's canonicity to the series' events is disputed. The character later appeared in several audio dramas produced by Big Finish Productions.

Mel returns in the 2022 special, "The Power of the Doctor", alongside several other former companions, who gather together as a support group to talk of their experiences with the Doctor. Mel next appears in the 2023 special, "The Giggle", where it is revealed that she was recruited by UNIT, having returned to Earth after Glitz's death. She helps the Fourteenth (David Tennant) and Fifteenth Doctors (Ncuti Gatwa) in defeating the Toymaker (Neil Patrick Harris), who had taken control of the minds of the human race, with Mel being unaffected by the Toymaker's control due to her previous experiences with the Doctor.

Mel reappears in the series fourteen two-part finale "The Legend of Ruby Sunday" and "Empire of Death", where she infiltrates Triad Technology on behalf of UNIT to investigate Susan Triad (Susan Twist), reuniting her with the Doctor once again. After it is revealed that Triad is in fact a minion for Sutekh (Gabriel Woolf), an old enemy of the Doctor's, Mel helps the Doctor escape back to UNIT HQ, where she, the Doctor and Ruby Sunday (Millie Gibson) use a special machine called a "memory TARDIS" to escape as Sutekh destroys the rest of the universe. Sutekh kills and possesses Mel, and animates Mel's body to return the Doctor and Ruby to the present day. After the Doctor defeats Sutekh and restores the universe, Mel returns to normal. Mel is last seen in "The Reality War".

Following the episode, Langford released a book starring Mel and Glitz titled Death in the Stars, which features the pair attempting to solve a murder in which they are the prime suspects.

== Development ==
According to producer Eric Saward, series producer John Nathan-Turner had told him that he wanted to have a "redhead companion" on the series. Nathan-Turner had immediately suggested Bonnie Langford. Langford at the time was a well-known, veteran actor, which authors at SFX considered to be part of John Nathan-Turner's plans to get Doctor Who talked about in the press. Langford was also known for having a strong scream, which multiple authors believed was a factor in her casting.

Nathan-Turner wished to depict Mel's first meeting with the Doctor on-screen in an episode which would have followed Trial of a Time Lord. However, the subsequent departure of lead actor Colin Baker prior to production of the new season made an in-universe introduction between the Sixth Doctor and Mel impossible. A new script editor was hired to the series following Season 24 who wished to take the series in a different direction. As a result, Mel's character was written to adapt to the episodes as written, and was given no character arc. Due to a lack of clarification regarding her backstory, many writers, including Gary Russell and Craig Hinton, have attempted to give her more detail in spin-off material for the series. Mel's last name "Bush" was never used on-screen, only being used in spin-off audio dramas produced by Big Finish Productions.

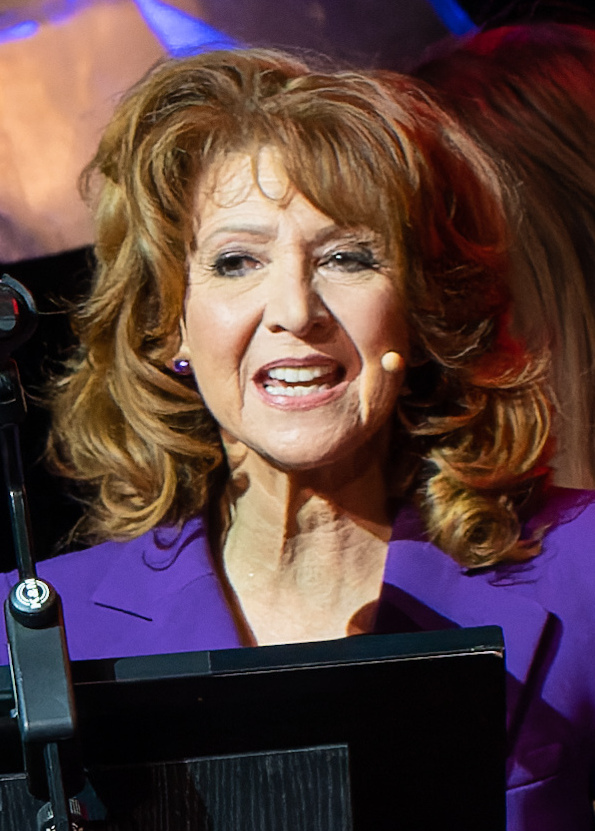
Mel is portrayed by Bonnie Langford (pictured in 2023).

Langford stated that she had not been happy with her performance in the classic series, with Mel's role in the original series being considered by Langford to be akin to a "diversion," which led to Langford feeling as though she couldn't "find her footing" in the role of Mel. Mel was eventually removed from the series; while it has been stated that poor audience reaction to Mel's role in the classic series led to the character's hasty removal from the series, co-star Sylvester McCoy has stated that the reason for her departure was because "[Langford] couldn't take it anymore," with Langford electing to leave the show of her own accord. In a later interview, Langford stated she left the series because producers had not asked her to stay on for another season, and Langford wished to guarantee she had another role lined up following her role on Doctor Who. The producers were originally content to let Langford leave according to McCoy; Mel had no departure scene in the original script of Dragonfire. According to McCoy, he had to argue with producers to get a scene for Mel's departure, with the producers using a scene McCoy shot for a screen test for the departure scene.

After Langford had collaborated with Doctor Who showrunner Russell T Davies on an audio drama, Langford was directly asked by Davies to return to the revived series of Doctor Who, with Langford being sent a script "out of the blue" by Davies with an offer to return. Unlike in the original series, Mel's character now utilized her technological background that had been often ignored in classic series episodes. Langford stated that her work with Big Finish had allowed her to continue to hone Mel's character, which she stated aided her performance in the revived series of the show. According to Langford, Mel was "a lot calmer. She’s a lot more resilient and resourceful and I think she's a lot more independent," and that "she's grown up, she's been around, she's seen a lot."

She also stated that she preferred playing Mel in the revived series than in the classic series due to Mel's maturation, and also responded positively to the support she had received from fans for her role and for Davies's expansion of the character. Langford explained that Mel's in-universe reason for returning was because "she had to stop travelling the universe and actually, literally, get back to down to Earth and face the things she's been running away from." Davies originally planned to kill Mel at the end of "Empire of Death" (2024), but decided against it during writing of the episode. During the in-episode commentary for "Empire of Death", Davies hinted that the mystery of Mel's family would play a role in the future of the series.

== Reception ==
Contemporary audiences strongly disliked Mel, primarily due to Mel often acting in a damsel in distress role, leading to plots focused around getting Mel out of trouble. Many audiences viewed her as a "crybaby" that distracted from more important stories. Her role, which was considered an outdated stereotype, was not liked by many audiences, and the character became widely remembered for her high-pitched screaming when faced with dangerous situations. During her time on the show, less than half of viewers enjoyed her character. The BBC's internal viewer reaction reports stated that Mel was a highly unpopular character, with a large number of viewers wishing the character had been eaten during the episode Paradise Towers (1987). Her dynamic with the Sixth Doctor also received mixed responses, with some feeling it didn't work well with the Sixth Doctor's "gruff" characterisation, while others enjoyed the pairing.

Adi Tantimedh, writing for Bleeding Cool, additionally stated that Mel was associated with the negative side of the classic series of Doctor Who due to her minimal story role and the low quality of the seasons she starred in. However, despite criticisms towards the character, Tantimedh appreciated the optimism of her character despite how little that trait was acknowledged in the classic series. Mel's character was also described as adding "sweetness" to the Sixth Doctor's usual irritable personality; when she was paired with McCoy's Seventh Doctor, the character's compassion was emphasized, which was further shown later on with her joining Glitz, a character who she wished to help grow into a better person. Mel's role in the series was debated by authors of SFX; while her role was considered poorly written and underdeveloped, Langford's performance was stated to be enjoyed by children at the time, and Langford was praised for being able to give weight to Mel's weaker character.

Mel's re-appearance in the series was highlighted for expanding her character, with her reappearances in Big Finish-produced audio dramas and the revived television series being praised by fans due to the further development of her character. Tantimedh additionally praised Mel's return to the series for adding depth to Mel's character and allowing the character to evolve past sexist tropes that had been present in her prior appearances.
