= History of Doctor Who =

Production history British TV sci-fi series (1963–present)

Doctor Who is a British science fiction television series, produced and broadcast by the BBC on the BBC TV channel from 1963 to 1964, and on BBC1 (later BBC One) from 1964 to 1989 and 2005 to 2025. A one-off television film, co-produced with Universal Pictures, was broadcast on the Fox network in the United States in 1996.

== Origins ==
In March 1962, Eric Maschwitz, the Assistant and Adviser to the Controller of Programmes at BBC Television, asked Donald Wilson, the Head of the Script Department, to have his department's Survey Group prepare a study on the feasibility of the BBC producing a new science fiction television series. The report was prepared by staff members Alice Frick and Donald Bull, and delivered the following month, much to the commendation of Wilson, Maschwitz and the BBC's Assistant Controller of Programmes Donald Baverstock. A follow-up report into specific ideas for the format of such a programme was commissioned and delivered in July. Prepared by Frick with another Script Department staff member, John Braybon, this report recommended a series dealing with time travel as being an idea particularly worthy of development.

In December, Canadian-born Sydney Newman arrived at BBC Television as the new Head of Drama. Newman was a science fiction fan who had overseen several such productions in his previous positions at ABC Weekend TV and the Canadian Broadcasting Corporation. In March 1963, he was made aware by Baverstock – now promoted to Chief of Programmes – of a gap in the schedule on Saturday evenings between the sports showcase Grandstand and the pop music programme Juke Box Jury. Ideally, any programme scheduled here would appeal to children that had previously been accustomed to the timeslot, the teenaged audience of Juke Box Jury, and the adult sports fan audience of Grandstand. Newman decided that a science fiction programme would be perfect to fill the gap, and initiated a brainstorming session chaired by Wilson and including Braybon, Frick and another BBC staff writer, C. E. Webber.

Webber's first outline document about the series, dated 29 March 1963, envisioned the show, tentatively titled The Troubleshooters, being driven by a group of Earth-based, contemporary humans who are constantly conflicting with a recurring foe. Newman would then personally come up with the idea of an educational series featuring a time machine larger on the inside than the outside and the idea of the central character, the mysterious "Dr. Who"; he may also have given the series the same title. However, in a 1971 interview Donald Wilson claimed to have named the series, and when this claim was put to Newman he did not dispute it.

Webber's second outline, now calling the series Dr. Who, followed an amnesiac "frail old man lost in space and time" with a machine which enables him "to travel together through time, through space, and through matter." The character of Dr. Who was described as being "suspicious and capable of sudden malignance", disliking his other supporting characters, and hating scientific progress, with the secret mission to meddle with time and destroy the future, while his time machine was described as "unreliable" and being invisible. Sydney Newman penciled in a rejection of the character's description, as he didn't want the main character of the series to be "a reactionary", but a "father figure" who would "take science, applied and theoretical, as being as natural as eating". He also disliked the idea of an invisible time machine, saying that a "tangible symbol" was needed, but was enthusiastic about the idea of the time machine's unreliability. In addition, Webber suggested ways Dr. Who's identity could develop. He suggested Bethlehem as a location for a Christmas story and Dr. Who as Merlin, as Jacob Marley, and his wife as Cinderella's godmother chasing her husband through time. Newman wasn't keen on the proposed direction for the series, writing, "I don't like this much - it reads silly and condescending. It doesn't get across the basis of teaching of educational experience - drama based upon and stemming from factual material and scientific phenomena and actual social history of past and future."

The final memo detailing the format of the series, written by Wilson, Webber, and Newman and dated 16 May 1963, described the character of Dr. Who as a "650 years old" man whose "watery blue eyes are continually looking around in bewilderment and occasionally a look of utter malevolence clouds his face as he suspects his earthly friends of being part of some conspiracy". He "seems not to remember where he comes from but he has flashes of garbled memory which indicate that he was involved in a galactic war and still fears pursuit by some undefined enemy". His ship is also described as "a police telephone box [...] but anyone entering it finds himself inside an extensive electronic contrivance. Though it looks impressive, it is an old beat-up model which Dr. Who stole when he escaped from his own galaxy in the year 5733; it is uncertain in performance; moreover, Dr. Who isn't quite sure how to work it, so they have to learn by trial and error." Later in the year production was initiated and handed over to producer Verity Lambert and story editor David Whitaker to oversee, after a brief period when the show had been handled by a "caretaker" producer, Rex Tucker. Concerned about Lambert's relative lack of experience, Wilson appointed the experienced staff director Mervyn Pinfield as associate producer. Australian staff writer Anthony Coburn also contributed, penning the very first episode from a draft initially prepared by Webber.

Doctor Who was originally intended to be an educational series, with the TARDIS taking the form of an object from that particular episode's time period (a column in Ancient Greece, a sarcophagus in Egypt, etc.). When the show's budget was calculated, however, it was discovered that it was prohibitively expensive to re-dress the TARDIS model for each episode; instead, the TARDIS's "Chameleon Circuit" was said to be malfunctioning, giving the prop its characteristic 'police-box' appearance.

The series' theme music was written by film and television composer Ron Grainer (who would later go on to also compose the theme to The Prisoner, among others) in collaboration with the BBC Radiophonic Workshop. While Grainer wrote the theme, it was Delia Derbyshire who was responsible for its creation, using a series of tape recorders to laboriously cut and join the individual sounds she created with both concrete sources and square- and sine-wave oscillators. Grainer was amazed at the results and asked "Did I write that?" when he heard it. Derbyshire replied that he mostly had. The BBC (who wanted to keep members of the Workshop anonymous) prevented Derbyshire from getting a co-composer credit and half the royalties. The title sequence logo was designed by graphics designer Bernard Lodge, with the sequence itself realised by electronic effects specialist Norman Taylor.

== 1960s ==
=== First Doctor ===
The title screen of the unaired pilot episode of Doctor Who

After actors Hugh David (later, a director on the series) and Geoffrey Bayldon had both turned down approaches to star in the series, Verity Lambert and the first serial's director Waris Hussein managed to persuade 55-year-old character actor William Hartnell to take the part of the Doctor. Hartnell was known mostly for playing army sergeants and other tough characters in a variety of films, but Lambert had been impressed with his sensitive performance as a rugby league talent scout in the film version of This Sporting Life, which inspired her to offer him the role.

Hartnell's Doctor would initially be accompanied by his granddaughter Susan Foreman (played by Carole Ann Ford), originally to have been merely a travelling companion, but with a family tie added by Coburn, who was uncomfortable with the possible undertones the relationship could carry were they to be unrelated. They were joined in the first episode by two of Foreman's schoolteachers, Barbara Wright (Jacqueline Hill) and Ian Chesterton (William Russell), from contemporary 20th-century England. This remained the line-up of the series for the entire first season, but over time the regular line-up would change regularly as the Doctor's various companions left him to return home, having found new causes on worlds they had visited and elected to stay there, or even occasionally being killed off. However, he would always quickly find new travelling companions. Such characters were used by the production team to relate the point of view of the viewers at home, asking questions and furthering the stories by getting into trouble.

The first (pilot) episode of the series, "An Unearthly Child", had to be re-recorded owing to technical problems and errors made during the performance. During the days between the two tapings, changes were made to costuming, effects, performances, and the script (which had originally featured a more callous Doctor, and Susan doing unexplained things such as flicking ink on paper and folding it to produce a symmetrical pattern, and then tracing shapes over the pattern). This second version of "An Unearthly Child", the first episode of the very first serial, was transmitted at 5.15 pm on 23 November 1963, but due to both a power failure in certain areas of the country and the overshadowing news of US President John F. Kennedy's assassination, it drew minimal comment and was repeated the following week immediately before the second episode.

It was not until the second serial, The Daleks, that the programme caught the imaginations of viewers and began to ingrain itself in the popular consciousness. This was primarily due to the Dalek creatures introduced in this story. Devised by scriptwriter Terry Nation and designer Raymond Cusick, they were completely un-humanoid and like nothing that had been seen on television before. Lambert had in fact been strongly advised against using Nation's script by her direct superior Donald Wilson but used the excuse that they had nothing else ready to produce it. Once it was clear what a great success it had been, Wilson admitted to Lambert that he would no longer interfere with her decisions as she clearly knew the programme better than he did.

Hartnell's Doctor was not initially paternal or sympathetic; he described himself and Susan simply as "wanderers in the 4th dimension". He was cantankerous, bossy and occasionally showed a streak of ruthlessness. However, the character mellowed as he grew closer to his companions, and he soon became a popular icon, especially among children who watched the series. This alteration in the portrayal of the Doctor began during the fourth serial, Marco Polo. The Doctor's role was minimal during episode two, "The Singing Sands", and from the later episodes his portrayal of the character mellowed considerably.

The programme became a great success, frequently drawing audiences of 12 million or more, and the Daleks came back for several return appearances. Whitaker left the show early in the second season (though continued writing for it until 1970), being briefly replaced by Dennis Spooner, who in turn was replaced by Donald Tosh at the end of the season. Pinfield also left halfway through the season due to poor health but was not replaced.

By the time of the third season in 1965, however, some difficulties were beginning to arise. Lambert had moved on, to be replaced as producer by John Wiles, who did not have a good working relationship with Hartnell. The lead actor himself was finding it increasingly difficult to remember his lines as he was suffering from the early stages of the arteriosclerosis that would later cause his death. Wiles and Tosh came up with a way of writing Hartnell out in the story The Celestial Toymaker, by having the Doctor made invisible for part of the story, intending that when he re-appeared he would be played by a new actor. However, Wiles was forbidden to replace Hartnell by the new Head of Serials, Gerald Savory. Wiles had also hoped to make other bold changes, such as introducing a companion with a cockney accent (which was vetoed, as he was told all characters must speak "BBC English"), and resigned shortly afterwards (allegedly after learning that he would be sacked at the end of the season), with Tosh also resigning on principle.

By 1966, however, it was clear that Hartnell's health was affecting his performances, and that he would not be able to carry on playing the Doctor for a long period of time. By this point, Savory had moved on as Head of Serials and his successor, Shaun Sutton, was more agreeable to change, allowing Wiles' replacement, Innes Lloyd, to make many of the very changes that Wiles had been barred from. Lloyd discussed the situation with Hartnell and the actor agreed that it would be best to leave, although later in life he would claim that he had not wanted to go.

=== Second Doctor ===
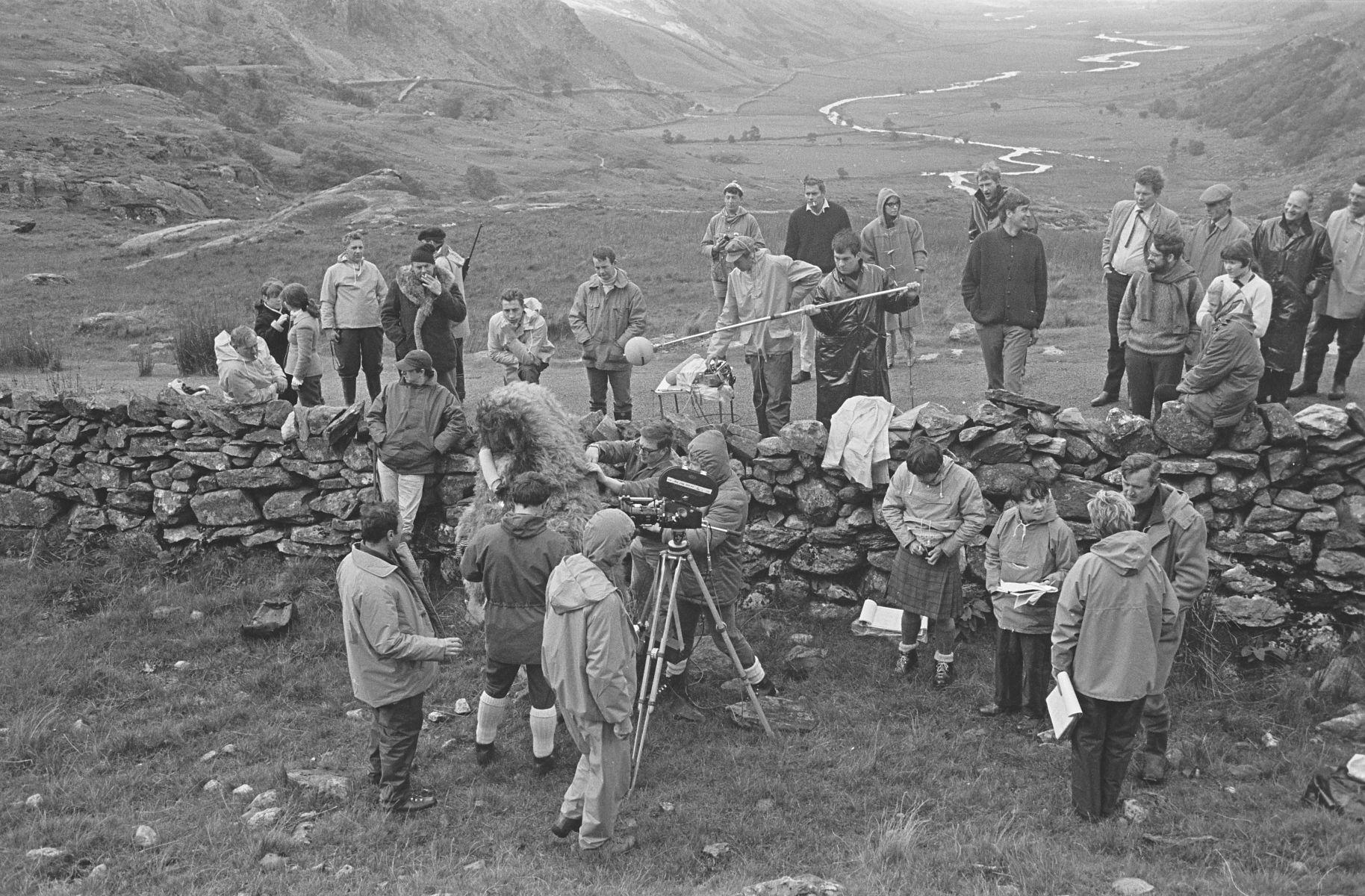
On the set of The Abominable Snowmen serial in 1967

Lloyd and story editor Gerry Davis came up with an intriguing way of writing the First Doctor out – as he was an alien being, they decided that he would have the power to change his body when it became worn out or seriously injured, a process that was called "renewal" but would later become known within the mythology of the series as "regeneration". Lloyd and Davis cast actor Patrick Troughton, who first appeared in November 1966 after the changeover from Hartnell had been seen at the end of the story The Tenth Planet. That serial also introduced the popular Cybermen, villains who would return to face the Doctor on several subsequent occasions.

Troughton played the role generally in a more lightweight, comical manner, albeit still with much of the original character's passionate hatred of evil and desire to help the oppressed. He also on occasion showed a darker side, manipulating his companions and the people around him for the greater good (examples include The Tomb of the Cybermen and The Evil of the Daleks). Davis left the show at the end of the fourth season and was replaced by Peter Bryant. A few months later, Lloyd left the show and Bryant was promoted to producer. Bryant's successor as script editor was Derrick Sherwin (though Victor Pemberton had filled the job for Bryant's first serial, The Tomb of the Cybermen).

Troughton remained in the part for three seasons until 1969, eventually tiring of the workload of starring in a regular series. By this time, the viewing figures for Doctor Who had fallen considerably, and new script editor Terrance Dicks recalled that there was some talk of ending the series after its sixth season in 1969 (though this has been denied by Bryant, Sherwin and director David Maloney, with paperwork suggesting it was actually in danger at the end of the seventh season in 1970). The series' budget was also increasingly strained by the cost of exotic sets, costumes and props every time the Doctor visited a new setting, and so Bryant and Sherwin (now effectively acting as co-producer, though the BBC refused to credit him as such) came up with the idea of reducing the cost of the series by setting all of the adventures on Earth, with the Doctor to act as the Scientific Advisor to an organisation called UNIT, the United Nations Intelligence Taskforce, charged with defending the Earth from alien invasion.

This new set-up was tested in the season-six story The Invasion, and at the end of the season was put in place more permanently by having the Second Doctor captured by his own race, the Time Lords, and sentenced to exile on Earth with his appearance being changed again as punishment for his interference in the affairs of other races. Thus Doctor Who ended its sixth production block and its black and white era. From then on, in common with other British television programmes, it was produced in colour.

== 1970s ==
=== Third Doctor ===
Sherwin's first choice to replace Troughton was actor Ron Moody, star of the musical Oliver!, but when he turned the part down, comic actor Jon Pertwee, another candidate from Sherwin's shortlist, was cast instead. Sherwin had hoped that Pertwee would bring much of his comic acting skill to the part, but he was keen to establish himself as a serious dramatic actor as well as a comedian. Although some lighter touches were visible throughout Pertwee's era, he essentially played it very "straight" and not at all as Sherwin had envisioned. Pertwee's Doctor was more action-oriented than his predecessors, and the producers allowed Pertwee to indulge his love of riding various vehicles during his tenure, including motorcycles, hovercraft, the so-called "Whomobile" and the Doctor's vintage roadster, "Bessie".

Sherwin stayed only to oversee the first story of the seventh season. Spearhead from Space was the first Doctor Who story to be made in colour and – due to industrial action in the electronic studios – the only example of the original series to be made entirely on film. Thereafter, he moved on to work on the series Paul Temple, and was replaced by director Barry Letts after another regular director on the show, Douglas Camfield, had turned down the job.

The seventh season, at twenty-five episodes, was shorter than any before and established a pattern of Doctor Who seasons being between twenty and twenty-eight 25-minute episodes in length, one that would last until the middle of the 1980s. However, although the new format of the Doctor being stuck on Earth had proved popular enough to save the programme from cancellation, neither Letts nor his script editor Terrance Dicks were particularly keen on the idea, and from the eighth season onwards sought reasons for the Doctor to be able to travel in time and space again, eventually having the Time Lords grant him full freedom after the 1973 tenth anniversary story, The Three Doctors, a serial which also featured guest appearances from Troughton and Hartnell, the latter in a restricted role due to his poor health.

Another innovation of theirs from the eighth season onwards was the introduction of the character of the Master as a new nemesis for the Doctor, conceived as a Professor Moriarty to the Doctor's Sherlock Holmes. Played by Roger Delgado, he became a highly popular character, although over the following two seasons it was felt, by both the public and the production office, that he became a little overused. Delgado and the production team eventually agreed that he should be written out during the eleventh season by killing the character off, with some ambiguity as to whether or not he had died to save the Doctor.

The Doctor Who "diamond" logo, used in the show's opening titles from 1973 to 1980

However, before this story could be written, Delgado was killed in a car accident in Turkey. His death had a profound effect on Pertwee. With actress Katy Manning also having departed from her role as companion Jo Grant after three seasons, and Letts and Dicks both planning to move on, Pertwee felt that his "family" on the show was breaking up, and he also decided to leave after the eleventh season in 1974. Also, according to Elisabeth Sladen in an interview on the DVD release of Invasion of the Dinosaurs, Pertwee asked for a substantially increased fee for another year on the series. However, this request was rejected and he subsequently resigned from the role.

=== Fourth Doctor ===
Although Letts and Dicks were both planning on leaving at the end of the same season, it was they who worked closely on re-casting the role of the Doctor, in preparation to hand over to their successors, producer Philip Hinchcliffe and script editor Robert Holmes, who had been a long-time writer for the programme.

Letts had intended to cast an older actor as the Fourth Doctor, to hark back to Hartnell's portrayal in the 1960s, but after a long search he eventually selected Tom Baker, who was suggested to him by the incoming Head of Serials, Bill Slater. Baker was only forty years old, almost fifteen years Pertwee's junior, but despite not being the type of actor Letts had originally been looking for, he went on to become arguably the most popular and best-remembered to play the role. He starred in the series for seven years, longer than any of his predecessors or successors, and during his time on the programme Doctor Who enjoyed a consistent run of popular success and high viewing figures. Baker's Doctor was a more eccentric personality, at times passionate and caring, but at other times aloof and alien. This ambivalence was a deliberate choice by Baker, in an attempt to remind the viewers that the Doctor was not human, and therefore had non-human characteristics.

Under the control of Hinchcliffe and Holmes, who took over from the beginning of the twelfth season, Doctor Who became a much darker programme, with the pair being heavily influenced by Hammer Films' successful horror film productions and other gothic influences. Their era achieved the highest viewing figures (average ratings for Hinchcliffe's 3 years were over 1 million higher than the average for any other producer) and is frequently praised by fans as a highly successful one, with many serials from that period remaining fan favourites. However, the BBC received complaints from Mary Whitehouse of the National Viewers' and Listeners' Association, that the programme was unfit for children and could traumatise them. While the BBC publicly defended the programme, after three seasons Hinchcliffe was moved on to the adult police thriller series Target in 1977, and his replacement, Graham Williams, was specifically instructed to lighten the tone of the storylines.

After staying on during the fifteenth season under Williams for a brief handover period, Holmes also left the programme, and his replacement, Anthony Read, worked with Williams, who was told to create a less violent and more humour-based approach, much to Baker's liking. The actor now felt very possessive of the part and frequently argued with directors over his inclusion of ad-libbed lines, but he was extremely pleased when the levity of the show increased even further after the departure of Read and the hiring of Douglas Adams as script editor for season seventeen in 1979. Some fans have criticised Adams for introducing too much of the sort of humorous content that served him well in The Hitchhiker's Guide to the Galaxy. However, others consider some of Adams' scripts to be among the series' high points, with City of Death (1979) being the primary example.

Season 17 saw the show garner its highest-ever viewing figures during the ITV network strike, with estimates of between 16 and 19 million viewers for episodes of the Williams and Adams penned story City of Death. However, there were also problems: director Alan Bromly left the production towards the end of the story Nightmare of Eden due to frustrations at the technicalities of production and arguments with Baker, leaving Williams to oversee completion of the story. Rampant inflation in the television industry was squeezing the series, with the budget much reduced in real terms from where it had been under Hinchcliffe. The scheduled final story of the season, Adams' own Shada, was abandoned midway through recording due to industrial action, and the season finished, after just twenty episodes, in January 1980.

Williams and Adams both departed at the end of the season, Williams because he had had enough of the programme after three seasons in charge, and Adams to concentrate on his increasingly successful Hitchhiker's franchise. Williams recommended to the Head of Series & Serials, Graeme MacDonald, that he be replaced by his Production Unit Manager, John Nathan-Turner. Although MacDonald agreed with the principle of appointing someone familiar with the workings of the show, he first offered the job to Nathan-Turner's predecessor George Gallaccio, who after leaving Doctor Who in 1977 had already gained experience as a producer on the BBC Scotland drama The Omega Factor. However, Gallaccio turned the role down, and MacDonald offered it instead to Nathan-Turner, who accepted and became the new producer.

== 1980s ==
=== John Nathan-Turner era ===
As Nathan-Turner was a new producer and a restructure of the Drama Department meant that MacDonald would not be able to offer the direct support that had been available to previous producers, the latter appointed Barry Letts to return to the series as Executive Producer and oversee Nathan-Turner's initial season working on the series. Letts had, in fact, been offering unofficial advice and comment to Graham Williams for some time beforehand.

Nathan-Turner and the new script editor, Christopher H. Bidmead, sought to return to a more serious tone for the series, reining in much of the humour that had been prevalent during Williams' tenure. The new producer also sought to bring the show "into the 1980s", commissioning a new title sequence, bringing all the incidental music in-house to be produced electronically by the BBC Radiophonic Workshop, and commissioning Peter Howell of the Workshop to come up with a brand-new arrangement of the series' famous theme tune. This displeased both Baker and his co-star Lalla Ward, who did not see eye-to-eye with Nathan-Turner on the new direction.

These changes arrived with season eighteen in the autumn of 1980, when the audience for Doctor Who fell dramatically to around five million viewers, due chiefly to competition from the ITV network's American import Buck Rogers in the 25th Century. Tom Baker decided that after seven seasons in the part he would leave the role. His departure was heavily publicised in the press, with Baker attracting much comment for his tongue-in-cheek suggestion that his successor could be a woman, which the publicity-aware Nathan-Turner was not quick to deny.

=== Fifth Doctor ===
The producer initially sought actor Richard Griffiths to succeed Baker, but when he proved unavailable, cast Peter Davison, with whom he had previously worked on the popular drama series All Creatures Great and Small. Davison was very different from his four predecessors, being much younger, in line with Nathan-Turner's desire for the Fifth Doctor to be completely unlike the popular Fourth, so that the public would not draw unfavourable comparisons between the two. Davison's Doctor was arguably the most human of them all, and the one whose vulnerability was emphasised the most. The Fifth Doctor, more often than not, reacted to circumstances around him rather than being proactive, and had the air of a young aristocrat about him, in contrast to Baker's bohemian personality.

Davison made his first appearance at the end of the season eighteen closer, Logopolis, although it was to be several months until his first full season in the part began in 1982. In the meantime Alan Hart, Controller of BBC 1, had decided to move the programme from autumn to a spring transmission slot. This was partly because, after eighteen years on Saturday evenings, he had also decided to change the transmission date, running the series twice-weekly on weekdays instead of once a week on Saturdays. This had the effect of halving the number of weeks the series was on-air to thirteen instead of twenty-six. Additionally, Davison was also working on the BBC sitcom Sink or Swim and was unavailable to record enough episodes to make an autumn start date viable.

This experiment in seeing the viability of running a twice-weekly drama serial would later lead to the launching of the massively popular soap opera EastEnders in a similar slot. It also had the short-term effect of doubling the Doctor Who audience, with the story Black Orchid being the final story of the regular run – and the only one of the 1980s – to break the double-figure millions barrier for the story overall, with a recorded figure of ten million viewers. The last individual episode with over ten million viewers was the first part of 1982's Time-Flight.

During the production of the nineteenth season, Bidmead decided to move on and was replaced as script editor, first temporarily by Antony Root and then on a more permanent basis by Eric Saward, who remained in the role for several years. He and Nathan-Turner oversaw an increasing reliance on the show's history in following seasons, with the return of various characters and adversaries from the Doctor's past, culminating in 1983 with the twentieth-anniversary special 90-minute episode, "The Five Doctors".

Davison left the part after three seasons in 1984. He had been advised by Patrick Troughton to stay no longer than three years and was also disenchanted with the quality of the scripts on the programme during the twentieth season. Although he felt things had improved in the twenty-first, by then his departure had already been announced, and Nathan-Turner had selected Colin Baker – who had appeared playing another character in the season twenty story Arc of Infinity – to replace him. Colin Baker became the Sixth Doctor on screen in March 1984 after Davison's final story, The Caves of Androzani.

=== Sixth Doctor ===
Colin Baker's first full season in 1985 was reasonably successful. Alan Hart had decided to experiment with doubling the length of Doctor Who episodes, with season twenty-two comprising thirteen 45-minute episodes rather than twenty-six 25-minute ones as had previously been the case. The series also returned to Saturday evenings, where it continued to draw reasonably respectable figures of seven to eight million viewers for most episodes even though it faced stiff opposition from another American import on ITV, The A-Team. Baker's portrayal of the Doctor also met with criticism. A more bombastic and overbearing personality than any of the others, the Doctor's use of deadly force against his enemies in a few stories caused controversy.

The series once again drew some criticism for the "horrific" content of some of the episodes. Unlike those misgivings levelled at the earlier reign of producer Philip Hinchcliffe, however, many of these came from within the BBC itself. Michael Grade had taken over as Controller of BBC 1 in 1984, and was not a fan of the series. In fact, he later admitted in interviews that he "hated" the programme, and he wanted to cancel it outright. There is much debate, however, as to how far his decisions were driven by his personal views. At the time, the BBC was suffering a financial shortfall due to expensive ventures such as the launch of EastEnders, breakfast and daytime television, and savings were needed across the corporation.

In any case, when it was announced that Doctor Who's production would be moved back a financial year, the news was interpreted as that the show was under threat of cancellation. The press and public outcry was much larger than Grade or the Board of Governors of the BBC had expected, being given a full-page front cover story in the popular tabloid newspaper The Sun. A charity single, "Doctor in Distress", was even produced and released in March 1985. It was written by Ian Levine and Fiachra Trench and performed by a group of 30 mid-level celebrities, including Nicola Bryant, Nicholas Courtney and Colin Baker himself, under the banner "Who Cares". The single was universally panned.

Baker's era was interrupted by what would be a long 18-month hiatus between seasons 22 and 23, compared to the then-usual gap of nine months between seasons. Before its postponement, plans for season 23 were well advanced, with scripts already drafted and in at least one case distributed to cast and production workers.

Season twenty-three eventually aired in the autumn of 1986. Production of the new season was complicated by various factors. Although the episode length had reverted to 25 minutes, the number of episodes was reduced to fourteen, just over half the length of most previous seasons. The series was still up against The A-Team and, having been off the air for eighteen months, found it hard to regain viewers who had turned to ITV. Saward and Nathan-Turner had decided on an overarching storyline for the entire season entitled The Trial of a Time Lord, but its complexities proved confusing to both writers and viewers, with the season drawing viewing figures of only four to five million.

Problems existed behind the scenes as well. Robert Holmes, who had returned to writing for the series on a semi-regular basis in 1984, died before he could deliver the final episode. In addition, Saward and Nathan-Turner had a falling out, with Saward resigning from the programme, and Nathan-Turner unofficially taking on the role of script editor after Saward's departure. Despite all of this, Grade consented to allow the series to continue, and moved it away from Saturday nights into a mid-week slot once more, and limited it again to a season of only fourteen 25-minute episodes. He also ordered that a new Doctor be found, as he was not enamoured of Colin Baker's portrayal. Baker was therefore dismissed from the role, despite Nathan-Turner's pleas to the BBC management that Baker did not fulfill his three-year contract, having effectively completed the equivalent of only one-and-a-half seasons.

=== Seventh Doctor ===
Nathan-Turner had thought that he too would finally be leaving the series, but with no other producer available or willing to take on the series, he was instructed to remain. As a BBC staff producer, he had little choice but to either accept this or resign from the corporation's staff. Not having expected to be producing season twenty-four, Nathan-Turner was left with little time to prepare, hiring inexperienced Andrew Cartmel as script editor on the advice of a friend who had run a BBC Drama Script Unit course that Cartmel had attended, and casting little-known Scottish actor Sylvester McCoy as the Seventh Doctor. In his first season, McCoy, a comedy actor, portrayed the character with a degree of clown-like humour, but Cartmel's influence soon changed that. The Seventh Doctor developed into a darker figure than any of his earlier incarnations, manipulating people like chess pieces and always seeming to be playing a deeper game than he ever let on.

The new season was placed by Grade at 7.35 pm on Monday evenings opposite the ITV soap opera, Coronation Street. The latter was the most-watched programme on British television, and the viewing figures for Doctor Who suffered accordingly, though they were frequently the best for any BBC programme broadcast in the slot (viewing figures at the time did not take account of video recordings). The season's quality was also publicly derided by many fans of the programme, although over the following two seasons the criticism was balanced out by some happier viewers, who felt that the young team of writers being assembled by Cartmel was taking the programme in the right direction.

Nathan-Turner attempted to leave once more at the end of production on the twenty-fifth season in 1988, but was once again persuaded to stay for a further year after another BBC producer – Paul Stone, who had produced The Box of Delights – was offered the position but declined. He and Cartmel remained on the production team for the twenty-sixth season in 1989. Although the season once again drew praise, the viewing figures were disastrous, starting at around the 3 million mark and improving to only around 4.5 million by the season's conclusion. At the end of the year, Cartmel was head-hunted to script-edit the BBC's popular medical drama, Casualty, and Nathan-Turner also finally left the show, although no replacements were assigned for either position as in-house production was being shut down.

Although Michael Grade had left the BBC in 1987 to take up a new position as Chief Executive of Channel 4, Doctor Who remained in its poor slot opposite Coronation Street in seasons of only fourteen 25-minute episodes, and continued to suffer in the ratings. Jonathan Powell, the new Controller of BBC 1, regarded Nathan-Turner with contempt, and the BBC's new Head of Series, Peter Cregeen, decided to cancel the series, a decision which was clear to the production team by the end of production on the twenty-sixth season in August 1989.

The final story to be produced as part of the original run was Ghost Light, although it was not the last to be broadcast. That was Survival, the last episode of which was transmitted on 6 December 1989, and brought the series' twenty-six-year run to a close. John Nathan-Turner decided close to transmission that a more suitable conclusion should be given to the final episode as it was possibly going to be the last ever. Accordingly, Andrew Cartmel wrote a short, melancholic closing monologue for Sylvester McCoy, which McCoy recorded on 23 November 1989 – by coincidence, the show's twenty-sixth anniversary. This was dubbed over the closing scene as the Doctor and his companion Ace walked off into the distance, apparently to further adventures.

== 1990s ==
=== Planned Season 27 ===
At the time production of the original series was cancelled, work had already begun on Season 27. Both McCoy and incumbent companion Sophie Aldred (Ace) have stated that they would have left during this season. Storylines would have seen Ace joining the Time Lord academy on Gallifrey, and the introduction of a cat burglar as the new companion. Script editor Andrew Cartmel had already begun work on four loosely connected stories which would have comprised the season: Earth Aid by Ben Aaronovitch (a space opera featuring insect-like aliens), Ice Time by Marc Platt (set in 1960s London, featuring the return of the Ice Warriors and Ace's departure), Crime of the Century by Cartmel (a contemporary story featuring animal testing), and Alixion by Robin Mukherjee (in which the Doctor is lured to an isolated asteroid to play a series of life-or-death games). Ahead of the new companion's introduction, Ice Time would have featured her father, a criminal named Sam Tollinger, who was intended to be a recurring character. Alixion would have seen the Doctor going insane after facing a psychic enemy, with mental rather than physical strain being the cause of his regeneration at the end of the season. However, since the programme was placed on indefinite hiatus, none of these stories were fully developed. Actors Richard Griffiths and Ian Richardson were two names mentioned by the production team as replacements for McCoy.

(The above details appear based primarily on a theoretical article written by Dave Owen for Doctor Who Magazine in issue 205, August 1997. In particular, the concept of regeneration through insanity was of Owen's own invention and was never part of the plans of Andrew Cartmel or his team of writers, although Cartmel has since become aware of the idea and given it his approval as a potentially fitting end to the Seventh Doctor. None of the stories above were commissioned at the time of cancellation, even to the point of rough outlines, and were put together by Dave Owen from interviews with the most likely authors to have been commissioned had the series gone ahead.)

On 12 November 2009, Big Finish Productions announced an audio version of Season 27 with Sylvester McCoy and Sophie Aldred and Beth Chalmers as new companion named Raine Creevey (not Kate Tollinger as previously suggested). Marc Platt contributed Thin Ice, while script editor Andrew Cartmel has written Crime of the Century, Animal and co-written Earth Aid with Ben Aaronovitch.

=== Beyond television ===
After the series was taken off the air in 1989, various Doctor Who projects were produced under license from the BBC. Doctor Who Magazine continued its long-running comic strip and published original fiction, initially continuing the run of stories with the Seventh Doctor and Ace and featuring other companions and Doctors. Virgin Publishing published a series of original books, The New Adventures of Doctor Who (NAs), from 1991 to 1997. This series continued the stories of the Seventh Doctor, further exploring and developing the themes and ideas introduced in the later years of the television series. Several writers who had worked on that era wrote NAs, as well as writers of earlier eras and some writers who would work on the new series, including Russell T Davies, Paul Cornell, Mark Gatiss and Gareth Roberts. The NAs introduced original companions, including Bernice Summerfield, and at one point the series editors considered regenerating the Doctor; they did however regenerate The Master. The success of the NAs led Virgin to publish The Missing Adventures, featuring earlier Doctors and companions, and several short story anthologies.

Following the television movie (see below), the Eighth Doctor replaced the Seventh in both the comic strip and original books. BBC Books took back the rights to publish original fiction in 1997 and published two series, the Eighth Doctor Adventures and the Past Doctor Adventures as well as some anthologies of short stories, until 2005. Big Finish Productions adapted several NAs, minus the Doctor, into audio plays; on the back of these, they won a license from the BBC to produce original audio plays featuring the Doctors and their companions, and eventually also produced plays featuring other characters and monsters from the TV series and spin-offs; Big Finish has also published short story anthologies. Big Finish attracted a number of writers from the books series as well as new writers, including Rob Shearman; it also gave future Doctor David Tennant his first acting role in a Doctor Who story.

For more information, see the Doctor Who spin-offs article.

Although it was for all intents and purposes cancelled (series co-star Sophie Aldred said in the documentary More Than 30 Years in the TARDIS that she was told it was cancelled), the BBC maintained the series was merely "on hiatus" and insisted the show would return. Nathan-Turner would produce just one more Doctor Who project, the 30th anniversary spoof mini-episode Dimensions in Time, in 1993, a replacement for an aborted 30th-anniversary project called The Dark Dimension.

=== Eighth Doctor ===
Although in-house production had ceased, the BBC were hopeful of finding an independent production company to re-launch the show and had been approached for such a venture as early as July 1989 (while the 26th season was still in production) by Philip Segal, a British expatriate who worked for Columbia Pictures' television arm in the United States. Segal's negotiations dragged on for several years and followed him from Columbia to Steven Spielberg's Amblin Entertainment company and finally to Universal Studios' television arm. At Amblin, Segal had come close to interesting the CBS network in commissioning the series as a mid-season replacement show in 1994, but this eventually came to nothing.

Finally, at Universal, Segal managed to interest the Fox Network in the programme, in the form of their vice-president in charge of Television Movie production, Trevor Walton, an Englishman who was already familiar with the series. Although Walton had no power to commission a series, he was able to commission a one-time television movie that served as a backdoor pilot for a possible series revival. The movie that was eventually made was simply titled Doctor Who. To distinguish it from the television series, Segal later suggested the alternate title Enemy Within. Opinions on how to refer to the television movie differ among fans, but the most common usage is to just call it the "television movie" or abbreviate it as "the TVM".

The original plan was for a completely new American version of Doctor Who, in the same way that Sanford and Son was an unrelated re-make of Steptoe and Son and All in the Family had re-made Till Death Us Do Part. However, when new scriptwriter Matthew Jacobs came on board in 1995 – at Walton's persuasion, feeling that a simpler story was needed than the intricate back-stories Segal had created with writer John Leekley – he persuaded Segal that the movie should instead be a direct continuation of the BBC series, something no American production had ever attempted before when buying the rights to a British programme.

Segal agreed, and Sylvester McCoy appeared briefly at the beginning of the film, before "regenerating" into the Eighth Doctor as played by Paul McGann. McGann had been Segal's first choice for the part, although both the actor himself and the Fox Network had not initially been keen. Segal later claimed that the BBC's Executive Producer on the project, Jo Wright, had wanted the role of the "previous Doctor" to be played by Tom Baker, as it was felt he was regarded as the definitive Doctor by the British public and McCoy's tenure had not been as popular, but she backed down when Segal explained how this went against the continuity of the programme. Segal also had to fight to retain the familiar Doctor Who theme: composer John Debney wanted to write a new piece, but was convinced to create a rearrangement of Ron Grainer's composition, although Grainer did not receive screen credit for his work. A further tie to the BBC series was the use of the logo used from 1970 to 1973 during the Jon Pertwee era. This logo subsequently became the official franchise logo until it was replaced in 2004, although it would appear on all merchandise featuring any of the original series Doctors up until 2018.

Transmitted on the Fox Network on 14 May 1996 and on BBC One thirteen days later – although actually having debuted on CityTV in Toronto, Canada, the film having been shot in Vancouver, on 12 May – the production drew only 5.5 million viewers in the United States, although it was far more successful in the UK with 9 million viewers, one of the top-ten programmes of the week.

McGann's Doctor was a combination of boyish glee and wonder at the universe with occasional flashes of an old soul in a young body, and was well received by fans, even if the reactions to the television movie were mixed. However, in spite of the success and popularity of the film in the UK, the disappointing US viewing figures led Fox to decline to commission a series. With no broadcast network attached in the United States, Universal could not produce a series for the BBC alone. Indeed, it would have been cheaper for the BBC to make a new series themselves rather than pay for a series with no production partner. Thus plans for a new series were scrapped, with no new production looking likely as the decade came to an end.

=== Back to the BBC ===
Following the 1996 television movie, Universal retained some rights to produce new Doctor Who stories, but without a broadcaster attached, they allowed those rights to expire. Full production rights, therefore, reverted to the BBC in 1997.

Little happened at the BBC regarding new Doctor Who production until the following year, when producer Mal Young arrived at the corporation's in-house production arm as Head of Continuing Drama Series. Young was keen on reviving the programme, and this interest was shared by the then controller of BBC One, Peter Salmon. Tony Wood, a producer in Young's department, who previously worked at Granada Television, recalled his former colleague Russell T Davies's enthusiasm for the programme and recommended him to Young as someone who might make a good writer of a new version. Davies had recently written for the Granada dramas The Grand and Touching Evil for the ITV network, and earlier in the decade had worked for the BBC, writing the well-received children's science fiction serials Century Falls and Dark Season, which itself contained many Doctor Who-influenced themes.

A meeting was arranged between Davies and Mal Young's development producer, Patrick Spence. In 1999 the media took hold of the story following the success and critical acclaim surrounding Davies's Channel 4 drama, Queer as Folk. Although various sources claimed that a provisional title of Doctor Who 2000 had been given to the proposed new series, in reality very little work had been done, as Peter Salmon had been informed by BBC Worldwide that a new series would upset the tentative plans they were making for a new film version of the series. Thus, plans for the television revival were shelved for the time and seemed to become even less likely in 2000 when Salmon was replaced as controller of BBC One.

== 2000s ==
=== 40th Anniversary Doctor ===
However, Salmon's successor, Lorraine Heggessey, proved to be equally enthusiastic about the idea of new Doctor Who, often commenting to the press that she would like to pursue the idea but that "rights difficulties" prevented it. Similarly positive comments were made by the corporation's overall Head of Drama, Jane Tranter. Heggessey had received several new series proposals since she had taken over control of BBC One, the highest-profile being from producer Dan Freedman – who had produced a full-cast, official, audio Doctor Who story, entitled Death Comes to Time, for the BBCi website in 2001. Another came from actor and writer Mark Gatiss, who in 2002 drew up and submitted a proposal in collaboration with writer Gareth Roberts and then Doctor Who Magazine editor Clayton Hickman.

In the meantime, BBCi, the interactive media arm of the corporation, who had scored successes with their Doctor Who webcasts (beginning with the aforementioned Death Comes to Time, which was followed by Real Time in 2002 and a re-make of the uncompleted Shada in 2003), decided on a more ambitious project to celebrate the programme's upcoming 40th anniversary. In July 2003, BBC announced the production of Scream of the Shalka, a fully animated adventure adapted for webcasting with Richard E. Grant as the Doctor and Sir Derek Jacobi as the Master. As there were no concrete plans for producing a new series, BBC announced Shalka as the official continuation of the programme, and that Grant was the official Ninth Doctor. However, events were soon to overtake that.

=== Ninth Doctor ===
In September 2003, Heggessey managed to persuade Worldwide that as several years had now passed and they were no nearer to producing a film, BBC television should be allowed to make a new series. The other proposals notwithstanding, Tranter and Heggessey elected to approach Davies once again, who had often told the BBC when approached for other projects that he would only return to them to take charge of a new series of Doctor Who. He quickly accepted, and on 26 September 2003 it was officially announced that Doctor Who would be returning to BBC One, produced in-house at BBC Wales in 2004 for transmission in 2005.

Davies was made the chief writer and executive producer of the new series (called Series 1 instead of continuing the numbering with Season 27, although the narrative thread continued from the old series rather than starting afresh), and other writers included Mark Gatiss, Steven Moffat, Paul Cornell and Rob Shearman. The producer was Phil Collinson and the other executive producers were Mal Young (although he subsequently left the BBC midway through production at the end of 2004), and BBC Wales Head of Drama, Julie Gardner. A new arrangement of the theme tune was composed by Murray Gold. Gardner later commented that the choice of Cardiff as the base for filming the series was the result of a combination of factors. She and Davies, who had worked together on the BBC drama series Casanova starring David Tennant, were both from Wales; the BBC was looking to move more of its productions away from London, and there was a good variety of filming locations in the area.

The new series would comprise thirteen 45-minute-long episodes, with the first story titled "Rose" after the Doctor's new companion Rose Tyler. Unlike past seasons which used serial-style storytelling, the new series would have mainly standalone or two-part episodes. Filming of the first season began in Cardiff on 18 July 2004. With the new series confirmed, when Shalka was webcast in November 2003, the further adventures of Grant's Ninth Doctor were in doubt. In February 2004, plans for sequels to Shalka were indefinitely shelved, although Grant's version of the character, now dubbed the "Shalka Doctor", would return in a short story entitled "The Feast of the Stone" published on the BBC website.

After much speculation in the press about possible candidates, BBC announced that Christopher Eccleston would be the Ninth Doctor, accompanied by former pop singer Billie Piper as Rose. In the April 2004 issue of Doctor Who Magazine, Davies announced that Eccleston's Doctor would indeed be the Ninth Doctor, relegating Grant's Ninth Doctor to non-official status.

In April 2004, Michael Grade returned to the BBC, this time as the Chairman of the Board of Governors, although this position does not involve any commissioning or editorial responsibilities. Although he was quoted as being generally indifferent to the new series, he eventually wrote an e-mail to BBC Director-General Mark Thompson in June 2005, after the successful new first series, voicing approval for its popularity.

"Rose" finally saw transmission on 26 March at 7 pm on BBC One, the first regular episode of Doctor Who for over 15 years. To complement the series, BBC Wales also produced Doctor Who Confidential, a 13-part documentary series with each episode broadcast on BBC Three immediately after the end of the weekly instalment on BBC One. "Rose" received average overnight ratings of 9.9 million viewers, peaking at 10.5 million. The final figure for the episode, including video recordings watched within a week of transmission, was 10.81 million, No. 3 for BBC One that week and No. 7 across all channels. The success of the launch saw the BBC's Head of Drama Jane Tranter confirming on 30 March that the series would return both for a Christmas Special in December 2005 and a full second series in 2006.

The series was well received by both critics and the public. The 2005 TV Choice/TV Quick Award went to Eccleston for Best Actor, and Doctor Who was nominated for Best Series. Eccleston, Piper, and Doctor Who were all winners in their categories at the UK's National Television Awards, announced on 25 October 2005. The series went on to win two BAFTA awards in May, including the Best Drama Series category.

Due to an initial lack of interest by networks in the United States, Doctor Who debuted on the Sci Fi Channel on 17 March 2006, one year after the Canadian and UK showings.

Although the new series clearly continues the storyline of the original – with Eccleston identified in publicity materials as the Ninth Doctor, and the appearance of original series elements such as UNIT and Sarah Jane Smith – the BBC is officially treating the series as a new programme, calling the 2005 season "Series 1". This has led to controversy between fans who wish to follow the BBC's numbering and those who consider the 2005 series to be Season 27 (and so on).

Concurrent with the new series, BBC Books revamped its line of Doctor Who original fiction, retiring, for now, its Eighth Doctor and Past Doctor paperback line (the last such volume appearing in late 2005) and launching a new series of hardback novels featuring the Ninth and, later, Tenth and Eleventh Doctors (see New Series Adventures).

=== Tenth Doctor ===
Hours after the announcement of a second series, tabloid newspapers The Sun and the Daily Express reported that Eccleston had quit the series. Eccleston then apparently released a statement through the BBC, saying that he would be leaving the role at Christmas for fear of being typecast.

Fan reaction to the news ranged from disappointment to sadness to irritation to outright anger. Some did point out, however, that the series is uniquely suited to deal with cast changes. The number of angry postings on the popular Outpost Gallifrey fan forum was to force Shaun Lyon, the owner of the website, to close down the forum for two days to allow tempers to cool.

Speculation arose as to how long the production team had been aware of Eccleston's decision. Eventually, it transpired that the departure had been planned and the scripts were written to accommodate Eccleston's departure, but it was not meant to have been announced until after the first series had concluded. The BBC said that they had falsely attributed the statement to Eccleston, and released it in violation of an earlier agreement not to reveal his departure publicly. The statement had been made after journalists made queries to the press office.

On 16 April 2005, the BBC confirmed that David Tennant would be the Tenth Doctor. The regeneration from Eccleston to Tennant took place in "The Parting of the Ways", the season finale. Tennant and Piper next starred in a 7-minute mini-episode for Children in Need. Tennant's first full story as the Doctor was the 2005 Christmas special, "The Christmas Invasion", and Piper joined him for the whole of Series 2.

At a BAFTA screening of "The Parting of the Ways", the finale of the 2005 series, on 15 June 2005, Jane Tranter announced that both a second seasonal episode (later titled "The Runaway Bride") and third series of Doctor Who had been commissioned. Piper left the programme at the end of Series 2, and a new companion, Martha Jones (played by Freema Agyeman), joined Tennant at the start of Series 3 on 31 March 2007.

Series 2 aired in the UK and US in 2006 and finished airing in Canada on 12 February 2007. The third series aired in the UK in the spring of 2007 and began airing in Canada and the US during the summer of that year. A 2007 Christmas Special "Voyage of the Damned" was broadcast on 25 December 2007 in the UK, featuring Kylie Minogue as a waitress named Astrid Peth.

The fourth series aired in the UK in 2008 featuring two companions; Donna Noble, who first appeared in "The Runaway Bride" and Martha Jones, who returned to the series for five episodes of series four. Billie Piper also returned to the show to reprise her original role as Rose Tyler.

Following broadcast of the fourth series, the BBC announced that the show would not return as a weekly series in 2009, due to a number of factors. Instead, four specials would be broadcast in 2009, with a full series returning in 2010. It was later announced that when the full series returned in 2010, Tennant would no longer be the Doctor. Playing the role would be the 26-year-old actor Matt Smith.

The return of Doctor Who has led to the BBC launching a number of spin-offs and related programmes. The first of these was the behind-the-scenes series Doctor Who Confidential which began airing on BBC Three in conjunction with the 2005 series and returned for a new set of episodes in 2006; each episode focuses on elements of that week's Doctor Who episode and the series continued alongside all stories for a number of years. In 2006, the first full Doctor Who spin-off series, Torchwood, debuted on BBC Three; it did not air in the United States until BBC America debuted it in September 2007, while the Canadian CBC aired it in October 2007. A second behind-the-scenes series, Totally Doctor Who, which aired on BBC One, also debuted in 2006. After the appearance of Sarah Jane Smith in the 2006 episode "School Reunion", it was announced that Elisabeth Sladen would reprise the role in a new series entitled The Sarah Jane Adventures, the first episode of which aired on BBC One on 1 January 2007, followed by its debut as a weekly series in September 2007. Following Sladen's death, the programme came to an end after its fifth series in autumn 2011. Yet another spin-off series, K-9, was announced for 2007, but this series was not being produced by the BBC. In addition, Tennant and Agyeman provided voice acting work for The Infinite Quest, an animated serial that aired as part of the 2007 series of Totally Doctor Who.

== 2010s ==
=== Eleventh Doctor ===
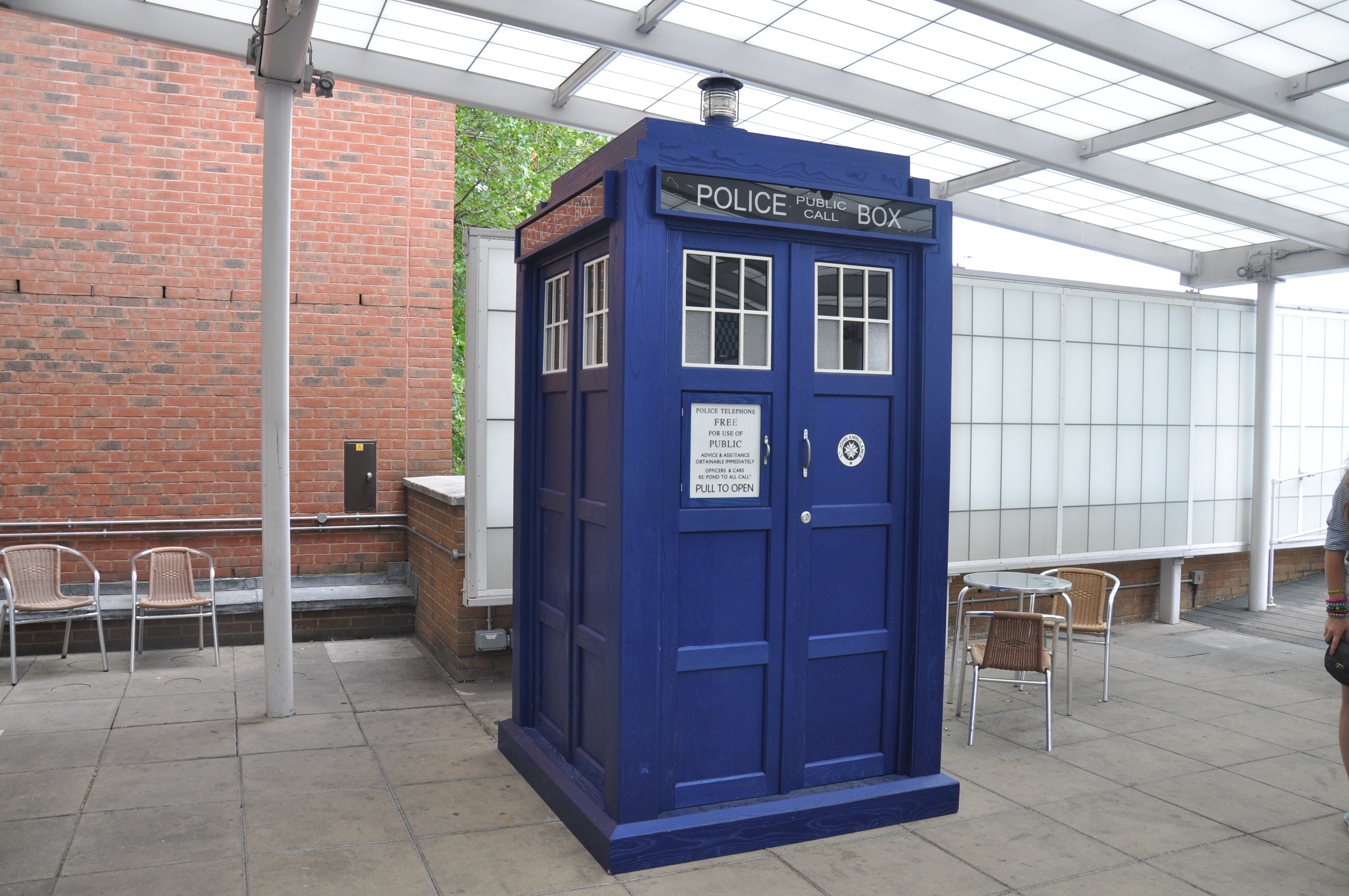
The TARDIS prop used from 2010 to 2017.

On 20 May 2008, it was announced that Russell T Davies would step down as executive producer and head writer of Doctor Who in 2009; Steven Moffat was confirmed as his replacement.

On 29 October 2008, during his acceptance speech via live feed at the National Television Awards, David Tennant publicly announced his intention to exit the series at the end of the 2009 specials, making way for a new actor to portray the eleventh incarnation of the Doctor in the 2010 series. 26-year-old actor Matt Smith was announced as his successor in a special edition of Doctor Who Confidential, broadcast on BBC One on 3 January 2009. Production on Moffat and Smith's first series began in July 2009, and the first episode was broadcast on 3 April 2010.

The new series was accompanied by a new logo, unveiled on 6 October 2009, and a new title sequence. The series featured a completely redesigned TARDIS interior, a slightly altered TARDIS police box exterior, and a new companion – Amy Pond – portrayed by Karen Gillan. Gillan was joined on a recurring basis by Arthur Darvill, playing Amy's boyfriend (later husband) Rory Williams, and Alex Kingston as the mysterious River Song.

The Eleventh Doctor's first series concluded on 26 June 2010 with the transmission of the series finale "The Big Bang", followed by another Christmas Special, "A Christmas Carol" and a pair of Comic Relief mini-episodes, "Space" and "Time," broadcast on 18 March 2011.

A second full series of 13 episodes was commissioned for 2011, with Smith and Gillan both returning as the Doctor and Amy respectively (making it the first time since the show's relaunch in 2005 that both the Doctor and main companion had remained the same from one series to the next). The series was broadcast in two halves, with the first seven episodes broadcast between April and June 2011, and the final six beginning on 27 August 2011. With the new series, Darvill was upgraded to series regular and full-time companion as Rory, and Kingston continued to appear on a recurring basis as River Song.

Due partly to budget restrictions at the BBC, the expected 2012 series, Smith's third, was split into 5 episodes transmitted from September 2012 and a further 8 transmitted from April 2013, with the now traditional Christmas special between these 2 groups of episodes. Gillan and Darvill departed from the show at the end of the first group of episodes; new companion Clara Oswald debuted in the 2012 Christmas special, played by Jenna Coleman.

The advent of the show's 50th anniversary in November 2013 meant that instead of starting to film an 8th series, the BBC started work on a feature-length special, to be transmitted on 23 November 2013, the precise date of the show's 50th anniversary. As well as being made in 3D for presentation at selected cinemas, the episode was also announced to be co-starring David Tennant and Billie Piper, reprising their roles of the Tenth Doctor and Rose, though ultimately Billie Piper played The Moment, a Gallifreyan Weapon that took the form of Rose.

Smith stepped down as the Eleventh Doctor with his last episode being the 2013 Christmas special.

=== Twelfth Doctor ===
It was announced on 4 August 2013 on a live BBC special entitled Doctor Who Live: The Next Doctor that Peter Capaldi would portray the twelfth incarnation of the Doctor in Doctor Who. During his appearance in the special, he said that he had been a fan of the series; a letter that he had written to the Radio Times at the age of 15 about the show was read aloud. Capaldi had already appeared in the series 4 episode "The Fires of Pompeii" as Caecilius, the father of the family that the Doctor saves from the eruption of Mount Vesuvius. He had also appeared in Torchwood: Children of Earth as the civil servant John Frobisher.

Series 8 was broadcast weekly in one continuous block, albeit with a reduced length of 12 episodes in total. Jenna Coleman remained as a main cast member in the role of Clara. The series premiere "Deep Breath" was first broadcast on 23 August 2014. The 2014 Christmas special "Last Christmas" was originally intended to be Clara's exit from the show but was rewritten following Coleman's decision to stay for an additional series.

Series 9 was again commissioned for 12 regular episodes, starring Capaldi as the Doctor and Coleman as Clara. The series premiered on 19 September 2015 with the episode "The Magician's Apprentice". Most of the series consisted of two-part stories, with the exception of the ninth episode "Sleep No More" acting as a standalone story and the final three episodes forming a loose three-parter. Coleman departed from the show in the series finale "Hell Bent", broadcast 5 December 2015. The 2015 Christmas special, "The Husbands of River Song", saw Alex Kingston return for the character River Song's final appearance.

On 22 January 2016, the BBC announced that Moffat would be stepping down as showrunner after series 10 of Doctor Who and would be replaced by Chris Chibnall as lead writer and executive producer. In addition, series 10 would debut in Spring 2017, with a Christmas special airing in 2016. On 30 January 2017, Peter Capaldi announced he would be stepping down as the Twelfth Doctor in the 2017 Christmas special.

Series 10 once again starred Peter Capaldi as the Doctor and introduced Pearl Mackie as a new companion Bill Potts. Matt Lucas as the recurring guest character Nardole was also promoted to series regular. The twelve-episode series premiered on 15 April 2017 with "The Pilot". Cast members Capaldi, Mackie and Lucas, as well as showrunner Moffat and composer Murray Gold, all departed from Doctor Who in the 2017 Christmas special "Twice Upon a Time", which also guest-starred David Bradley as the First Doctor.

=== Thirteenth Doctor ===
It was announced on 16 July 2017 that Jodie Whittaker would portray the Thirteenth Doctor in the eleventh series. She is the first woman to be cast in the role. The series introduced a new set of companions, including Bradley Walsh, Tosin Cole, and Mandip Gill as Graham O'Brien, Ryan Sinclair and Yasmin "Yaz" Khan, respectively. A new logo was unveiled at the BBC Worldwide showcase on 20 February 2018. This logo was designed by the creative agency Little Hawk, who also created a stylised insignia of the word "who" enclosed in a circle with an intersecting line. A new opening title sequence was also introduced; however, it did not debut until the second episode of the series. Segun Akinola took over as the series composer, creating a new rendition of the theme music along with an assortment of original music cues.

Series 11 premiered on 7 October 2018 with "The Woman Who Fell to Earth". The episode count was again reduced to ten regular episodes. In place of the traditional Christmas special that had aired annually over 2005–2017, a New Years special, "Resolution", was broadcast on 1 January 2019.

No regular episodes were broadcast throughout 2019. Series 12 was commissioned for another ten-episode run in 2020, with all the main cast from the previous series returning. Rather than having a dedicated Christmas or New Years special, 1 January 2020 instead saw the broadcast of the series premiere "Spyfall, Part 1"; the series then took up its regular timeslot on 5 January with "Spyfall, Part 2". The series concluded with "The Timeless Children", which saw the Doctor learning of her true origins as an alien lifeform from another universe, rather than a Time Lord as she had always believed. The episode received 4.69 million views upon its airing, the lowest view count of any episode in the modern series. It was followed by the special "Revolution of the Daleks", which was broadcast on New Years Day 2021, and was the second episode produced in 4K Ultra HD, alongside Twice Upon a Time.

On 29 July 2021, Jodie Whittaker and Chris Chibnall announced that they would both step down as The Doctor and showrunner respectively, after the thirteenth series in 2021 and a trio of specials in 2022.

Series 13, also entitled Flux premiered on 31 October 2021 with "The Halloween Apocalypse". This was the first time in the revived series, and the second overall time, that all the episodes in the series would be one story. The last time this happened was in "The Trial of a Time Lord". The episode count for this series was reduced from the original eleven, to a six chapter series, with three additional specials that followed in 2022, due to the ongoing COVID-19 pandemic. The first special aired on 1 January 2022 entitled "Eve of the Daleks", the second special aired on 17 April 2022 entitled "Legend of the Sea Devils" and the third special aired on 23 October 2022 entitled "The Power of the Doctor" as part of the BBC's Centenary Celebrations, which was Jodie Whittaker's final appearance as the Doctor.

== 2020s ==
=== Fourteenth Doctor ===
On 24 September 2021, the BBC announced that Russell T Davies would be returning as showrunner for the 60th anniversary in 2023, and the series beyond. It was also announced that the show would be co-produced by BBC Studios and Bad Wolf, founded by production staff of Doctor Who. On 8 May 2022, Ncuti Gatwa was announced to play the Doctor. The following week it was announced that David Tennant and Catherine Tate would be returning to the show to reprise their roles as The Doctor and Donna Noble in a series of three specials for the show's 60th anniversary.

On 23 October 2022, Tennant made his return to the role at the end of "The Power of the Doctor". It was then announced that Tennant would be playing the Fourteenth Doctor, and Gatwa would be playing the Fifteenth Doctor.

On 25 October 2022, it was announced that the BBC agreed a partnership to stream the series on Disney+ outside of the UK and Ireland alongside introducing the new logo for the 60th anniversary specials and beyond.

The Show is produced and mastered in 4K HDR from the 60th anniversary Specials onwards.

On 10 October 2023, as part of the 60th anniversary of Doctor Who, the BBC announced that they have cleared the rights to allow more than 800 episodes of Doctor Who programming — including episodes from the classic and revival series, Torchwood, The Sarah Jane Adventures, Class, and Doctor Who Confidential — as part of its iPlayer offering from 1 November 2023. Episodes included new accessibility options, including subtitles, audio description, and sign language. The release of these episodes excluded the first Doctor Who serial, An Unearthly Child (1963), due to a lack of agreement between the BBC and the son of the serial's late writer Anthony Coburn.

On 30 October 2023, the BBC announced it would be using the term "Whoniverse" in an official capacity to describe all shows within the orbit of Doctor Who, and specifically their home on BBC iPlayer, including documentary programming.

Tales of the TARDIS was released on 1 November on the BBC iPlayer as the first Whoniverse exclusive release. A Whoniverse ident was also introduced to unify content within the Whoniverse collection. This series sees the return of several Doctors and companions from the classic series as a celebration of the show's 60th anniversary.

On 17 November 2023, a special five-minute minisode starring Tennant as the Fourteenth Doctor titled "Destination: Skaro" was broadcast during the 2023 Children in Need telethon. It also featured the return of Julian Bleach as Davros.

On 24 November 2023, Tennant appeared in-character as the Fourteenth Doctor for the CBeebies Bedtime Story.

The 60th anniversary specials premiered on 25 November 2023 with "The Star Beast" directed by Rachel Talalay. It features the first full adventure of David Tennant as the Fourteenth Doctor, and the return of Catherine Tate as Donna Noble. They are also joined by returning cast members Jacqueline King, and Karl Collins, and new cast member Yasmin Finney. The second special "Wild Blue Yonder" features the return of, and the final acting performance of actor Bernard Cribbins as Wilfred Mott. This episode is dedicated to his memory. The specials conclude with "The Giggle", which featured the return of The Toymaker from the 1966 story "The Celestial Toymaker", this time played by Neil Patrick Harris. This episode also feature the return of Bonnie Langford as Mel Bush after her brief cameo at the end of "The Power of the Doctor". The episode also introduces the concept of the "bi-generation", which sees the first appearance of the Fifteenth Doctor played by Ncuti Gatwa splitting from the Fourteenth Doctor, resulting in both incarnations existing at the same time. As a result, for the first time, this regeneration story and post-regeneration story is also a multi-Doctor story.

=== Fifteenth Doctor ===
On 8 May 2022, Ncuti Gatwa was announced to play the Doctor.

On 18 November 2022, during Children in Need, Millie Gibson was announced as the new companion Ruby Sunday.

Ncuti Gatwa and Millie Gibson debut as the Fifteenth Doctor and companion Ruby Sunday in the 2023 Christmas Special "The Church on Ruby Road". This marks the return of the annual Christmas specials.

It was confirmed that the new series starring Ncuti Gatwa will be called Season 1 instead of Series 14 as a result of a season numbering reset.

On 7 June 2023, Bonnie Langford was announced to be reprising her role as Mel Bush for the series.

On 23 October 2023, it was announced that filming for the second season has started, marking the first time the second season of a new Doctor has entered production even before the first episode of their predecessor had aired.

At the end of the Season 2 episode "The Reality War", the Fifteenth Doctor regenerated, seemingly taking on the appearance of his former companion Rose Tyler (Billie Piper). The BBC did not elaborate on whether or not she was the new Doctor.

=== 2026 Commonwealth Games opening ceremony ===
The opening ceremony of the 2026 Commonwealth Games began with Sir Chris Hoy and Greg McHugh stealing the TARDIS from the Seventh Doctor (Sylvester McCoy) in order to escort King Charles III and Queen Camilla from Balmoral Castle to the ceremony in Glasgow. The segment was well received by spectators. It was also made available on YouTube.

=== Future ===
Disney ended its partnership with the BBC in 2025. Davies announced his departure in June 2026, with his last episode being the second season finale the previous year. Continuing to commit to the show's future, the BBC put the show out for competitive tender.

On 12 June 2025, the BBC announced it was seeking a production company to work on an animated spin-off for pre-school audiences, set to air on CBeebies from 2027 to 2029. On 17 December 2025, it was announced that the contract had been awarded to Blue Zoo. On 6 October 2026, the BBC released a teaser image for the series, Doctor Who: TARDIS Crew, featuring a young Doctor and his companions pursued by the Daleks, with the TARDIS visible in the background.
