= The Curse of Fatal Death =

- Doctor Who charity special
- VHS cover art

Cast
- Doctors: Rowan Atkinson – The Doctor; Richard E. Grant – The Quite Handsome Doctor; Jim Broadbent – The Shy Doctor; Hugh Grant – The Handsome Doctor; Joanna Lumley – The Female Doctor
- Companion: Julia Sawalha – Emma
- Others: Jonathan Pryce – The Master; Roy Skelton, Dave Chapman – Dalek voices

Production
- Directed by: John Henderson
- Written by: Steven Moffat
- Produced by: Sue Vertue
- Executive producer: Richard Curtis
- Music by: Mark Ayres, (Note: Also Music and Special Sound Consultant) Malcolm Clarke, Jonathan Gibbs, Peter Howell, Paddy Kingsland, Roger Limb
- Running time: 4 episodes, 23 minutes total
- First broadcast: 12 March 1999

The Curse of Fatal Death is a Doctor Who special made specifically for the Red Nose Day charity telethon in the United Kingdom and was originally broadcast in four parts on BBC One on 12 March 1999 under the title Doctor Who and the Curse of Fatal Death. Later home video releases are formatted as two parts and drop the "and" in the title. It follows in a long tradition of popular British television programmes producing short, light-hearted specials for such telethon events.

It has a special status amongst Doctor Who-themed charity productions. It has twice been featured on the cover of Doctor Who Magazine – an unusual feat even for a regular episode of the programme. It is the only Comic Relief story to be covered by "DWM Archives", a section of DWM normally reserved for discussion of past episodes of the regular series. Similarly, it is the only parody to be given an extensive behind-the-scenes article on the BBC official website, and its own video release through BBC Video. It is also the only BBC-commissioned live-action Doctor Who production between the Doctor Who television movie in 1996 and "Rose" in 2005.

Finally, it serves as a production bridge – if not a narrative bridge – between the 1963 and 2005 versions of the show. Most notable amongst the many connections between "old" and "new" versions is the fact that it showcases the first televised Doctor Who script by Steven Moffat, the first post-production work of The Mill on the programme, the only time a woman produced an episode of the programme between Verity Lambert and Susie Liggat, and the final performance by the longest-serving Dalek vocal artist, Roy Skelton. Executive Producer Richard Curtis later wrote the 2010 episode "Vincent and the Doctor". Richard E. Grant, who plays the alternative Tenth Doctor, later appeared on the actual show as the main antagonist of the seventh series, the Great Intelligence, after performing the voice of an alternate version of the Ninth Doctor in an animated webcast serial Scream of the Shalka and appeared as one of the many previous faces of the Doctor in the episode Rogue.

== Plot ==
The story begins with the Master gloating over his latest scheme to destroy his nemesis. However, instead of only spying on the Doctor and his companion Emma on a giant screen, he is unaware that his microphone is on, so they hear his plans. Angry, he tries to cover up his error by gloating that of course he wanted The Doctor to know his plans, to make his revenge that much sweeter, before turning off the screen and gloating once more. However, The Master has still left the microphone on, so The Doctor still hears him gloating. The Doctor then invites his old foe to meet him at a castle on the planet Tersurus. The planet is in ruins, and was once the home of a now-extinct race of supremely-enlightened beings shunned by all because they used flatulence as their means of communication. They all died when they discovered fire.

The Master appears, gloating that he travelled a century back in time, and persuaded the architect of the castle to put in a secret death trap. The Doctor had anticipated this and travelled further back, persuading the same architect to sabotage the trap. The Master had also anticipated this, and arranged for an additional trap – with identical results because the Doctor had likewise anticipated his move. The Doctor informs the Master, having calculated that he "has saved every planet in the known universe a minimum of 27 times", and having grown tired of battles with aliens and "the endless gravel quarries", that he is retiring, having found a companion – Emma – with whom he has fallen in love. The Master springs yet another trap; a trap door under the Doctor's feet leading to the vast sewers of Tersurus, which he intends to suggest to the architect after going back in time again and buying him an expensive dinner. However, the Doctor had already bought the architect that dinner, so when the Master pulls the lever, a trap door opens beneath him instead.

Seconds later, as the Doctor and Emma start to leave, the Master bursts in. Having taken 312 years to crawl out, he emerges as an old man covered in sewage. Using his TARDIS to return to the present, he has brought allies – the Daleks (who, lacking noses, are the only race that will have anything to do with him). Additionally, he has been enhanced by superior Dalek technology, a Dalek suction-cup hand. To the Master's dismay, he cannot answer when Emma asks him what the suction-cup is for. The Master throws himself at the Doctor but falls into the sewers again, and immediately bursts in again, another 312 years older and with a walking stick. The Daleks give chase to the Doctor, knocking the Master once more into the sewers. Having spent a total of 936 years in the sewers, he returns using a zimmer frame (walker) and is easily outpaced by the slow moving Daleks.

Emma and the Doctor are captured when they run into a room full of Daleks. Rather than being exterminated immediately, they are tied to chairs aboard the Dalek ship, the Daleks promising Emma that they "will explain later" as to why they even possess chairs. The Master claims he has been enhanced again with Dalek technology – rejuvenating him and adding "Dalek bumps" to his chest, which also act as "etheric beam locators". The Doctor insults the Master, comparing the "bumps" to breasts. In return for his enhancements, the Master agreed to give the Daleks the Zektronic energy beam – a weapon that would "allow the Daleks to conquer the universe in a matter of minutes".

When the Doctor tells the Daleks they will have to share the universe "with the beard and the bosoms over there", they inform the Doctor that they plan to exterminate the Master after he has assisted them. The Doctor uses the Tersuran language (flatulence) to warn his fellow Time Lord. The Master helps the Doctor and Emma escape, but not before the Doctor is fatally injured by the Daleks. He tells Emma (in Tersuran, which the Master translates) that he loves her, then dies. The Doctor regenerates into a handsome and sexually eager new Doctor (Richard E. Grant). Forced to fix the Dalek weapon, he is also electrocuted and becomes a shy, middle-aged and overweight Doctor (Jim Broadbent). Another accident results in a handsome, smooth-mannered Doctor (Hugh Grant), but this Doctor is also accidentally killed while fixing the weapon. Due to the Zektronic energy beam's ability to disable the regenerative process, the Doctor permanently dies. The Master vows to live a life of heroism in honour of his fallen foe's memory, as do the Daleks.

Seemingly through the will of the universe itself, the Doctor does regenerate yet again, only this time as a woman (Joanna Lumley), who seems confused that her breasts are not etheric beam locators, despite each having an "on switch". Emma is deeply disappointed, pointing out that "You're just not the man I fell in love with." The Master, however, is quite smitten with this new Doctor, who notices the sonic screwdriver (which vibrates) has "three settings!", including that of a vibrator sex toy. The story ends with them walking off together, the Master promising to explain later as to why he is called the Master.

== Continuity ==
This story is connected to a number of others by virtue of its narrative and its production elements. Many of the story's actors also have other connections to the programme, although most of these connections take the form of various actors almost getting a role in the main production.

=== Narrative ===
- The planet Tersurus was first mentioned in The Deadly Assassin, where a severely deteriorated Master, at the end of his last regeneration, was found. The spin-off novel Legacy of the Daleks by John Peel relates the events leading up to the Master's arrival there.

=== Future references to this sketch ===
- The Doctor later married River Song in "The Wedding of River Song", also written by Moffat.
- The Dalek bumps worn by the Master are presumably a reference to the Time Lords' questioned ability at the time to regenerate across genders. Steven Moffat later created Missy, a female incarnation of the Master and the first Time Lord to regenerate from male to female, in "Dark Water". The same happened to the Doctor in "Twice Upon a Time", in which Jodie Whittaker became the first female Doctor, as foreshadowed here by Moffat casting Joanna Lumley. Coincidentally, both played the Thirteenth Doctor.
- "Never cruel or cowardly", as the Doctor is described here by Emma, was later revealed by Moffat in "The Day of the Doctor" to be the "promise" that is made by the taking of the name "The Doctor". It was used in a novel by Paul Cornell published shortly before this sketch aired, but originates from (and implicitly quotes) "The Making of Doctor Who" by Terrance Dicks in the 1970s. This was referenced again by the twelfth doctor, just before regeneration in "Twice Upon a Time".

=== Production ===
- The title sequence is the same as used during most of the Tom Baker era of Doctor Who, albeit edited to remove Tom Baker's face.
- The opening image of the TARDIS flying through space as the Master watches was taken from the beginning of the Doctor Who TV movie.
- Steven Moffat, best known at the time for the children's drama series Press Gang (which starred Julia Sawalha), was well known as a fan of Doctor Who and included many small continuity references in his script. He subsequently wrote several episodes for the series proper since its revival in 2005, starting with the two-part serial "The Empty Child"/"The Doctor Dances", and was the programme's head writer and executive producer between 2010 and 2017.
- The title Curse of Fatal Death is a tautology (it being impossible to have a death that is not fatal), which parodies the sometimes melodramatic and tautological titles of the original series (an example being the 1976 serial The Deadly Assassin).
- This is the lone example of a BBC-only production prior to 2005 in which the TARDIS interior appears to be lit when viewed from the exterior. This continues a tradition begun in the 1996 television movie, and is common practice in the 2005 series. The visual effect was first seen in the film Dr. Who and the Daleks.
- The exterior TARDIS prop was the same Mark II fibreglass version used in the 1980s and in the 30th-anniversary story Dimensions in Time; Curse was the last time the prop was used.
- Other specially made episodes of Doctor Who include Dimensions in Time (1993), the officially untitled 2005 special mini-episode, and "Time Crash" (2007) — all produced for Children in Need — "Space" and "Time":, a two-part mini-story produced for Comic Relief in 2011 and "The Night of the Doctor" (2013). "Time Crash", "The Night of the Doctor" and "Space" and "Time" were written by Moffat.
- The main canon of the TV series would go on to feature the Doctor as a woman in her thirteenth official incarnation, this time portrayed by Jodie Whittaker.

==== Music ====
The production was deliberately based on the Fourth Doctor's era and a conscious effort was made to use cues taken directly from episodes of that era. However, the practical unavailability of these soundtracks forced the show's musical director, Mark Ayres, to use material mostly from the Fifth Doctor's era. Except for the reuse of the theme music, the majority of musical cues come from episodes between Meglos and The Caves of Androzani, with a brief excerpt also taken from the Third Doctor serial The Sea Devils as well as an excerpt from the Seventh Doctor serial The Greatest Show in the Galaxy (written by Ayres himself). The music during the episode's final scene, for example, is the same as that which played at the conclusion of the Fourth Doctor's regeneration into the Fifth in Logopolis. After each regeneration portrayed in the episode, music from Meglos is employed.

=== Actors ===
- Richard E. Grant was later cast as the Doctor in the animated 40th-anniversary adventure Scream of the Shalka in 2003, though his status was relegated to unofficial following the announcement of a new series in September 2003. He later played the villainous Great Intelligence (in its Walter Simeon persona) in 2012's "The Snowmen", and 2013's "The Bells of Saint John" and "The Name of the Doctor". In the 2024 episode "Rogue", Richard E. Grant's likeness was seen in a sequence of the Doctor's past regenerations.
- Jim Broadbent had previously played the Doctor in a sketch on Victoria Wood: As Seen on TV, mocking the series' perceived sexism, cheapness, and use of technobabble.
- Roy Skelton had voiced Daleks since 1967.
- Julia Sawalha was being considered for the role of a new companion, a "cat burglar" who would have been introduced in the twenty-seventh season. Building on this, a "what if" article in Doctor Who Magazine #255 featured her in this role along with a hypothetical Eighth Doctor, played by Richard Griffiths, who was at one time considered for the role of the Fifth Doctor.
- Hugh Grant was offered the role of the Doctor again ahead of Christopher Eccleston, and later said publicly that he regretted dismissing it without much thought when he saw how good the series was – and that he was hoping to play a villain in the ongoing programme instead. Russell T Davies later described Hugh Grant's performance as "fleetingly" one of the best performances in the part of the Doctor.
- Joanna Lumley is the first woman to play an incarnation of the Doctor. The second was Arabella Weir in the Doctor Who Unbound Big Finish episode Exile. On 16 July 2017, Jodie Whittaker was revealed as the official Thirteenth Doctor, becoming the first woman to be cast in the role of the Doctor within the "main" series.

== Broadcast and releases ==
- When originally broadcast, the title of the story was Doctor Who and the Curse of Fatal Death. The four episodes were later re-edited into a two-part story that was released to home video a few months following broadcast, with the proceeds again donated to Comic Relief. The opening credits were remade to include Rowan Atkinson's face. In the VHS release, the title was simply reduced to The Curse of Fatal Death.
- The serial was rebroadcast twice on UK Gold during their 40th anniversary marathon in 2003. Used as a five-minute "pause" between fan-chosen episodes of the classic era, it returned to its original title and four-episode format.
- The Curse of Fatal Death has been released digitally via iTunes (UK store only) and is available on both the Red Nose Day and Doctor Who channels on YouTube.
- Although released on VHS 6 September 1999, there have not been any plans to bring The Curse of Fatal Death out on DVD.
