= Scream of the Shalka =

2003 Doctor Who serial

Cast
- Doctor: Richard E. Grant – The Doctor
- Companion: Sophie Okonedo – Alison Cheney
- Others: Derek Jacobi – The Master; Conor Moloney – Dawson / Greaves; Andrew Dunn – Max; Craig Kelly – Joe; Anna Calder-Marshall – Mathilda Pierce; Diana Quick – Prime; Jim Norton – Major Kennet; David Tennant – Caretaker (uncredited)

Production
- Directed by: Wilson Milam
- Written by: Paul Cornell
- Script editor: None
- Produced by: Muirinn Lane Kelly
- Executive producers: Martin Trickey; James Goss; Mario Dubois
- Production code: None
- Series: None
- Running time: 6 episodes, 10–15 minutes each (80 minutes total)
- First broadcast: 13 November 2003
- Last broadcast: 18 December 2003

Chronology
← Preceded by —	Followed by → "The Feast of the Stone" (short story)

Scream of the Shalka is a Flash-animated series based on the British science fiction television series Doctor Who. The series is the 40th anniversary special and was originally released in six weekly parts from 13 November to 18 December 2003 on the BBC's Doctor Who website.

Although Scream of the Shalka continues the narrative of the original 1963–1989 programme and the 1996 television film, the show's 2005 revival ignored the events. The series was written by veteran Doctor Who writer Paul Cornell, with Richard E. Grant providing the voice for the Ninth Doctor. This performance followed years of rumours that Grant would play the Doctor in a film or new series, and he had appeared as the "Conceited Doctor" in the Comic Relief spoof The Curse of Fatal Death (1999).

Grant subsequently went on to appear in the revival of Doctor Who as Walter Simeon in "The Snowmen" (2012), and the Great Intelligence in "The Bells of Saint John" and "The Name of the Doctor" (both 2013). Grant was shown alongside the Doctor's other incarnations in the series 14 episode "Rogue" (2024). David Tennant, who appeared in a cameo role as the Caretaker, was cast as the Tenth Doctor in 2005 and the Fourteenth Doctor in 2023. Derek Jacobi reprised his role as the Master in "Utopia" (2007). The Doctor's companion for this adventure, Alison Cheney, was voiced by Sophie Okonedo, who appeared in the fifth series of Doctor Who as Liz Ten.

== Plot ==
The TARDIS has unexpectedly landed in the village of Lannet, Lancashire, in 2003. The Doctor, acting more disaffected than usual, lives with an android version of the Master, who acts as his ally. This version of the Master has the transferred consciousness of the original but can't leave the TARDIS. The Doctor makes the acquaintance of Alison Cheney, a local barmaid. The other villagers refused to tell him why the other villagers seem so fearful. A tremor strikes the area, killing a homeless woman, and swallowing the TARDIS into lava below. Angered by the homeless woman's death, the Doctor breaks into Alison's home, and she admits to seeing aliens. The other villagers have decided to stay inside and make as little noise as possible since it attracts creatures. The Doctor deliberately attacks two of the wormlike monsters, who burst up through the floor. He deflects their shrieking sonic attack back at them and they escape.

The Doctor contacts UNIT but says he doesn't want to get involved. He will leave as soon as he has the TARDIS returned to him. The Doctor leads a UNIT team down to get his ship. The creatures attack, and the Doctor separates himself from the group and meets Prime, the female commander of the Shalka Confederacy. Prime declares humans to be inferior and subject to their domination, declaring the start of an invasion of Earth. Prime orders her minions to have Alison killed, which forces the Doctor to make a deal to spare her life. The TARDIS is cast into a black hole the Shalka had created inside Earth which they are using as a gateway to bring in more troops. As he plummets into the black hole, the Doctor realizes his phone is still connected to the TARDIS and uses it to summon the ship; he and the Master expel the Shalka from the TARDIS into the black hole. For an unknown reason, the Shalka release Alison back to the surface.

As UNIT evacuates Lannet, the Doctor learns that one of the Shalka has been captured and that they have a vulnerability to pure oxygen. He also finds that the villagers have become mind-controlled by the invaders, who make them emit subsonic screams. The Earth's ozone layer is being stripped away as the Shalka's enslaved humans make their move all over Earth. The Doctor takes Alison and the Master back to the Shalka underground lair. Prime tells them that the Shalka inhabit 80% of the worlds in the universe. They live underground off of volcanic energy. When a species is on the edge of ecological destruction, the Shalka finish the job, with the rest of the universe none the wiser.

The Doctor swallows a small piece of Shalka he removed from Alison's forehead. He bonds with it, reprograms it, and uses its knowledge to plug himself into their sonic network and understand the shrieks. He engages Prime in a "sonic duel", which he purposely throws but only to get Prime to move him toward the black hole controls, so that he could send Prime to her death. The Doctor coughs up the piece of Shalka. He puts it back in Alison's head, where she fights off the remaining Shalka and shuts down the screams. The Doctor unplugs her a few moments before she can reprogram the scream to heal the atmosphere.

Back onboard the TARDIS, the Master reveals that it has been a long time since the Doctor had a living companion. His last companion was killed in the events that also led to the Master choosing to have his consciousness transferred into the android, and to the Doctor's exile. Without being specific, the Master tells her that they are being controlled by an unknown force. The Doctor wants Alison to stay as his companion but refuses to admit to it directly. She decides to leave Earth with the Doctor and see the universe.

== Production ==
Doctor Who had suspended production in 1989, and aside from charity specials had only resurfaced as an American-funded television movie in 1996, which did not garner enough ratings to go to a regular series. When Shalka was announced in July 2003 for planned broadcast in November, the possibility of Doctor Who returning to television screens still seemed remote and BBC Worldwide were continuing to shop around for another possible movie deal. As a result, BBCi officially announced, with BBC approval, that the Doctor appearing in Shalka would be the Ninth Doctor. However, events rapidly overtook this.

In September Lorraine Heggessey, the Controller of BBC One, managed to persuade BBC Worldwide that as their plans for a Doctor Who film were nowhere near fruition, BBC Television should be allowed to make a new series. A deal with Russell T Davies to produce the new series was quickly struck, and on 26 September, the BBC announced that Doctor Who would be returning to BBC One in 2005, produced by BBC Wales. As a result, the status of the Shalka webcast was in doubt even before it was released.

After the webcast, in February 2004, plans for sequels were indefinitely shelved. Though the webcast was followed by an online text short story entitled "The Feast of the Stone", and work was well underway on another webcast story, "Blood of the Robots", to be written by Simon Clark, production was halted. For a period, it was unclear if the new television Doctor would be the Ninth or Tenth Doctor, but this was ultimately settled in April 2004 when in an interview with Doctor Who Magazine, Davies announced that the new television Doctor (played by Christopher Eccleston), would be the Ninth Doctor, relegating Grant's Doctor to an alternate Doctor. Davies later commented that Grant had never been considered for the role in the television series, telling Doctor Who Magazine: "I thought he was terrible. I thought he took the money and ran, to be honest. It was a lazy performance. He was never on our list to play the Doctor." Grant's likeness later appeared alongside incarnations of the Doctor in the series 14 episode "Rogue".

The working title for this production was Servants of the Shalakor. This original story outline is included in the BBC Books novelisation (see below).

== In print ==
Scream of the Shalka
- Author: Paul Cornell
- Series: Doctor Who book: Past Doctor Adventures
- Release number: 64
- Subject: Featuring: Shalka Doctor; The Master; Alison
- Set in: Period between the 1996 TV movie and the 2005 revival
- Publisher: BBC Books
- Publication date: February 2004
- Pages: 248
- ISBN: 0-563-48619-8
- Preceded by: Deadly Reunion
- Followed by: Empire of Death

The novelization of Shalka was written by Paul Cornell. The book also includes a feature on the making of the webcast, as well as the original Servants of the Shalakor story outline.

== Critical analysis ==
A book length study of the serial, written by Jon Arnold, was published as part of The Black Archive series from Obverse Books in 2017. This detailed the story's key points and the production process, and featured an in depth look at the unmade sequel story Blood of the Robots. This book also revealed that the Big Finish audio drama Immortal Beloved was originally intended as a Shalka sequel before being adapted to feature the Eighth Doctor.

== DVD release ==
The British Board of Film Classification cleared all six episodes of the series for release on DVD. In March 2007, clips from the series were released to DVD, as part of Flash Frames, a documentary on the DVD release of the restored The Invasion. The story was released on DVD in Region 2 on 16 September 2013.
