= Doctor Who (film) =

1996 British television film

156 – Doctor Who: The Television Movie
- Doctor Who television film
- 1996 promotional poster

Cast
- Doctors: Paul McGann – Eighth Doctor; Sylvester McCoy – Seventh Doctor
- Companion: Daphne Ashbrook – Grace Holloway
- Others: Yee Jee Tso – Chang Lee; Eric Roberts – The Master; John Novak – Salinger; Michael David Simms – Dr. Swift; Eliza Roberts – Miranda; Dave Hurtubise – Professor Wagg; Dolores Drake – Curtis; Catherine Lough – Wheeler; William Sasso – Pete; Joel Wirkkunen – Ted; Jeremy Radick – Gareth; Bill Croft – Motorcyclist Policeman; Mi-Jung Lee – News Anchor; Joanna Piros – News Anchor; Dee Jay Jackson – Security Man; Gordon Tipple – The Old Master

Production
- Directed by: Geoffrey Sax
- Written by: Matthew Jacobs
- Produced by: Peter V. Ware; Matthew Jacobs (co-producer)
- Executive producers: Philip David Segal; Alex Beaton; Jo Wright (for the BBC)
- Music by: John Debney; John Sponsler; Louis Febre
- Production code: 50/LDX071Y/01X
- Series: Television film
- Running time: 89 minutes (Note: Original NTSC running time. The UK home video releases are affected by PAL speedup, which shortens the runtime to 85 minutes.)
- First broadcast: 12 May 1996 (Canada); 14 May 1996 (US); 27 May 1996 (UK)

Chronology
← Preceded by Survival	Followed by → "Rose"

Doctor Who, also referred to as Doctor Who '96 or as Doctor Who: The Movie or as Doctor Who: The Television Movie or as Dr Who in the US, is a 1996 television film continuing the British science fiction television series Doctor Who. Developed as a co-production between Universal Studios and BBC Worldwide, it premiered on 12 May 1996 on the Canadian television station CITV in Edmonton, Alberta, Canada, 15 days before its first showing in the United Kingdom on BBC1 and two days before being broadcast in the United States on Fox. It was theatrically released in some countries.

The first attempt to revive Doctor Who following its suspension in 1989, it was intended as a backdoor pilot for a new American-produced Who TV series. It introduced Paul McGann as the Eighth Doctor in his only televised appearance as the character until "The Night of the Doctor" in 2013 (though McGann has portrayed the Doctor also in various audio productions). It also marks the final appearance of Sylvester McCoy as the Seventh Doctor until his cameo appearance in "The Power of the Doctor" in 2022, the only appearance of Daphne Ashbrook as companion Grace Holloway, and the only onscreen appearance of Eric Roberts's version of The Master, although he has since reprised the role in audio dramas for Big Finish Productions. Although a ratings success in the United Kingdom, the film did not fare well on American television and no series was commissioned. The series was later relaunched on the BBC in 2005. The only Doctor Who episodes between the film and the new series were a 1999 spoof, Doctor Who and the Curse of Fatal Death, and a 2003 animation, Scream of the Shalka.

Although primarily produced by different entities than the 1963–1989 series and intended for an American audience, the producers chose not to produce a "re-imagining" or "reboot" of the series but rather a continuation of the original narrative. The production was filmed in Vancouver, British Columbia and is the only episode of Doctor Who to be filmed in Canada.

== Plot ==
The Doctor, currently in his seventh incarnation, transports the Master's remains from Skaro to Gallifrey via his TARDIS. The Master had been previously tried and executed at the hands of the Daleks. En route to their destination and while the Doctor reads, the locked box with the Master's remains breaks open. The Master, in the form of a snake-like ooze, leaks out and sabotages the TARDIS. The Doctor is forced to make an emergency materialisation in San Francisco's Chinatown on 30 December 1999.

After exiting the TARDIS, the Doctor is shot by a gang chasing down Chang Lee, a young Chinese-American man. Lee calls for an ambulance and escorts the unconscious Doctor to a hospital. The ooze also gets aboard the ambulance. At the hospital, after the bullets are removed, cardiologist Dr. Grace Holloway attempts surgery to stabilise his unusual heartbeat, but is confused by his strange double-heart anatomy. After the Doctor apparently dies on the operating table, his body is taken to the morgue, and Lee steals his possessions. That night, the Master takes over the body of Bruce, the paramedic.

Later, the Doctor regenerates. The new Doctor, suffering amnesia, recognises Holloway, who has resigned from the hospital after the failed operation. He follows her to her car and proves he is the same man she failed to save. Grace takes him home to recover. Now in Bruce's body, the Master convinces Lee that the Doctor had stolen his original body and persuades him into opening the TARDIS's Eye of Harmony, which requires a human retinal scan. When the Eye opens, the Doctor is flooded with memories and realises the Master is searching for him. He warns Grace that while the Eye is opened, the fabric of reality will weaken. Earth will be potentially destroyed by midnight on New Year's Eve if they cannot close it. To solve this conundrum, he needs an atomic clock, and there is one on display at the San Francisco Institute of Technological Advancement and Research.

The Doctor and the Master in their climactic battle

Outside, the Doctor and Grace find the ambulance. Stepping from it, the Master and Lee offer them a ride. The Doctor does not immediately recognise the Master, but discovers his true identity en route, and escapes with Grace. The two continue to the Institute, obtain the clock and return to the TARDIS. The Doctor then installs the clock and closes the Eye. However, the damage is so great that he must revert time before the Eye was opened to prevent Earth's destruction. As he connects the proper TARDIS circuits to do this, the Master takes control of Grace's body and she strikes the Doctor unconscious.

The Doctor wakes to find himself chained above the Eye, the Master poised to take his remaining regenerations while Lee and Grace watch. The Doctor is able to prove to Lee that the Master lied to him after the Master accidentally reveals that the Doctor's body is not his and he refuses to open the Eye again. Enraged, the Master kills him, forces Grace to open the Eye and begins drawing the Doctor's lifeforce. After being released from the Master's control, Grace completes the final circuits to put the TARDIS into a time-holding pattern, preventing the destruction. She then goes to free the Doctor. The Master kills her, but this has given enough time for the Doctor to free himself. In the ensuing fight, the Doctor gains the upper hand and pushes the Master into the Eye. The Eye closes and time reverts a few minutes, undoing Lee and Grace's deaths.

With no further risk to Earth, the Doctor prepares to leave. Lee returns his possessions and the Doctor warns him not to be in San Francisco on the next New Year's Eve. The Doctor offers Grace the opportunity to travel with him, but she politely refuses and kisses him goodbye. The Doctor returns to the TARDIS and begins to continue his book from the start of the film, while the record player begins to skip once more.

== Production ==
No. story	Title	Directed by	Written by	Original release date	Prod. code	UK viewers (millions)	AI
156	Doctor Who	Geoffrey Sax	Matthew Jacobs	12 May 1996 (Canada); 14 May 1996 (USA); 27 May 1996 (UK)	50/LDX071Y/01X	9.08	75

=== Pre-production ===
Producer Philip Segal had been trying for some years to launch a new American-produced series of Doctor Who, but the Fox Network — the only American network that showed any interest — was only prepared to commit to a single telemovie. It was hoped that, should the telemovie be successful, Fox might be persuaded to reconsider a series; however, the telemovie's ratings performance in America was not strong enough to hold Fox's interest.

A proposed bible for this series, written by John Leekley, was written for a potential pilot for the show's potential American revival. This outline would have established a new continuity, though would have drawn on elements from the original series and would have focused on the Doctor seeking his father, Ulysses, throughout time and space through a number of locales, such as his home planet Gallifrey, Ancient Egypt, and Skaro. A number of popular old stories, such as 1982's Earthshock, 1966's The Celestial Toymaker, and 1977's The Talons of Weng-Chiang, among others, would have been remade with altered locales and plots, with earlier drafts featuring a variety of other suggested story remakes. Leekley's scripts were not well-received, resulting in him being removed from the project in September 1994.

The production budget for the movie (as revealed in the book Doctor Who: Regeneration) was US$5 million, with the Fox Network spending $2.5 million, BBC Television contributing $300,000, and the remaining $2.2 million split between BBC Worldwide and Universal Television.

=== Casting ===
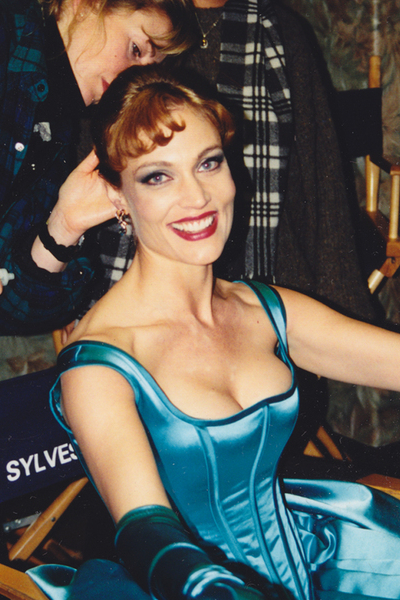
Daphne Ashbrook on set of Doctor Who in 1996

Casting sessions took place in March 1994; actors who actually auditioned for the role include Liam Cunningham, Mark McGann, Robert Lindsay, Tim McInnerny, Nathaniel Parker, Peter Woodward, John Sessions, Anthony Head, and Tony Slattery. Paul McGann was first considered around the time of these auditions, but did not formally audition for the part until later.

Among the actors who were invited to audition for the role of the Doctor but declined the opportunity were Christopher Eccleston and Peter Capaldi. Eccleston and Capaldi later played the Ninth and Twelfth incarnations of the Doctor, respectively, in the revived series of Doctor Who which began in 2005. Eccleston turned down the offer to audition because, he did not want to be associated with a "brand name" so early in his career. Capaldi declined because he felt it was unlikely that he would be given the part.

Of those actors who originally auditioned for the role of the Doctor, a number guest-starred in the series when it returned from 2005:

- Anthony Head guest-starred in the Series 2 episode "School Reunion" as Mr. Finch.
- Tim McInnerny guest-starred in the Series 4 episode "Planet of the Ood" as Klineman Halpen.
- Liam Cunningham guest-starred in the Series 7 episode "Cold War" as Captain Zhukov.
- John Sessions guest-starred in the Series 8 episode "Mummy on the Orient Express" as the voice of the homicidal computer GUS.

=== Production ===
The movie was filmed on 35mm film in Vancouver, British Columbia, the first time any Doctor Who story had been filmed in North America.

In the 2005 Doctor Who Confidential episode "Weird Science", and on the DVD commentary, Sylvester McCoy reveals that during the sequence where he locks the casket with his sonic screwdriver, he held the tool pointing the wrong way around (although in the original series, it is seen being used both ways). The sonic screwdriver was blurred in post-production to conceal the error.

=== Post-production ===
The opening pre-credits sequence went through a number of modifications, with several different voice-overs recorded. At one stage the voice-over was to be made by the old Master, played by Gordon Tipple; in the end this was not used. Tipple is still credited as "The Old Master", though in the final edit his appearance is very brief, stationary, and mute. Had the original pre-titles voice-over been used, it would have been unclear what incarnation of the Doctor Sylvester McCoy portrays in the movie (as he is simply credited as "The Old Doctor"). Only the rewritten narration (as read by Paul McGann) makes his number of regenerations clear. The sequence of the TARDIS flying through the time vortex was briefly reused in the opening of Doctor Who and the Curse of Fatal Death, as the Master observes Rowan Atkinson's Doctor.

Instead of designing a new Doctor Who logo for this film, it was decided instead to use a modified version of the logo that was used for the Jon Pertwee era of the original series (with the exception of the final season). This logo, being the last logo used on an "official" Doctor Who broadcast before the 2005 revival, was, until 2018, used by the BBC for most Doctor Who merchandise relating to the first eight Doctors. In 2018, efforts were made to make the show's merchandise more uniform, and so most items of merchandise began to use the logo designed for Jodie Whittaker's time as the Doctor, abandoning the "Movie" logo for the first time in 22 years.

John Debney was commissioned to write the score for this film, and intended to replace Ron Grainer's original theme with a new composition. Ultimately Debney did in fact use an arrangement of Grainer's music for the theme, although Grainer goes uncredited.

=== Alternative titles and labelling ===
Both DVD releases are labelled Doctor Who: The Movie. The VHS release contains both the name Doctor Who and the phrase The Sensational Feature Length Film (plausibly read as a subtitle). The novelisation was labelled simply The Novel of the Film. The 2021 Target Collection reissue of the novelisation is titled The TV Movie. The most common fan usage appears to refer to it as "The TV Movie" or "TVM", or variations thereof.

Upon translation into French, this film was renamed Le Seigneur du Temps (literal translation: "The Lord of Time").

"TVM" is the production code used in the BBC's online episode guide. The actual code used during production is 50/LDX071Y/01X. Doctor Who Magazine's "Complete Eighth Doctor Special" gives the production code as #83705. Big Finish Productions uses the code 8A, and numbers its subsequent Eighth Doctor stories correspondingly.

== Broadcast and reception ==
The movie premiered in Canada, on the Edmonton, Alberta CITV-TV station on 12 May 1996, two days prior to its Fox Network broadcast.

Commercials on the Fox network advertising the film used special effects footage from the 1986 story The Trial of a Time Lord, although this footage was not used in the movie. This marked the first time that footage from the original BBC series had been shown on a major American network. The advertisements also used a different arrangement of the Doctor Who theme music from that heard in the film.

The movie received disappointing US ratings. It received 5.6 million viewers, a total 9% share of the audience.

Maureen Paton in the Daily Express praised the movie "At last we have a grown-up hi-tech Doctor Who in Paul McGann...only a low-tech Luddite would miss the endearing amateurism of the old teatime serial format...the makers would be mad not to pursue the option of a series." Matthew Bond of The Times, by contrast stated "If the series is to return it will need stronger scripts than this simplistic offering, which struggled to fill eighty-five minutes and laboured somewhat in its search for wit". The letters pages of the Radio Times were divided between viewers who liked and disliked the TVM. Discussing the TVM, writer Gary Gillatt criticised it for having "too many unnecessary references" to the show's backstory. Gillatt added "although very entertaining, stylishly directed and perfectly played, the TV movie perhaps tried a little too hard to be what Doctor Who once was, rather than crusading to demonstrate what it could be in the future".

=== Awards ===
Doctor Who: The Television Movie won the 1996 Saturn Award for Best Television Presentation.

== Commercial releases ==
=== Home media ===
A LaserDisc release of the movie was released exclusively in Hong Kong by Universal in 1997.

The unedited version was released on DVD in the UK in 2001 titled as Doctor Who: The Movie, and was re-released in 2007 as a limited edition with an alternative cover sleeve (but with no change in content) as part of a series of classic series re-releases aimed at attracting fans of the revived series to the older shows.

Both the edited and unedited versions have also been released in countries such as Australia and New Zealand.

The 2010 DVD box set Revisitations contains the movie with new, updated Special Edition DVD features. It included a new commentary with Paul McGann and Sylvester McCoy, an hour-long documentary on the time in between the film and the series' cancellation in 1989, a documentary on the 7 years it took to get the film made, a documentary on the 8th Doctor's comic strip adventures, a documentary on the media reaction to the 8th Doctor, a documentary on the ties between Blue Peter and Doctor Who as well as all of the original features, including the original commentary with Geoffrey Sax.

Due to complex licensing issues, no VHS release of the film occurred in North America, and for more than a decade no DVD release occurred, either. Finally, on 25 August 2010, Dan Hall of 2entertain confirmed that the 2010 updated version would be released in North America sometime in the next twelve months following extensive negotiations with Universal Studios. Two months afterward, a North American DVD release date for the 2-disc Doctor Who: The Movie – Special Edition was announced to be 8 February 2011.

In 2013 it was released on DVD again as part of the "Doctor Who: The Doctors Revisited 5–8" box set, alongside the classic serials Earthshock, Vengeance on Varos, and Remembrance of the Daleks. Alongside a documentary on the Eighth Doctor, it also features an introduction from then current show runner Steven Moffat. This was also released in North America.

The movie was released as a 2-disc Blu-ray set in Region 2 on 19 September 2016. The footage was not re-scanned from the original film negatives. Instead it is a 1080/50i upscale which suffered from the same PAL speedup issue as previous home media releases.

On 19 February 2026, it was announced that the original negatives of the movie had been discovered, and had been re-edited (as the film was originally edited on videotape) and remastered into 4K to be released on 25 May 2026.

==== VHS releases ====
Season	Story no.	Serial name	Duration	Release date		
Season	Story no.	Serial name	Duration	UK	Australia	USA / Canada
—N/a	156	Doctor Who – The Movie	1 × 85 min.	May 1996	November 1996	—N/a

==== DVD and Blu-ray releases ====
All releases are for DVD unless otherwise indicated:

- ^{(B)} indicates a Blu-ray release
- ^{(B,UHD)} indicates a simultaneous Blu-ray and Ultra HD Blu-ray (includes Blu-ray) release

Season	Story no.	Serial name	Duration	Release date		
Season	Story no.	Serial name	Duration	R2	R4	R1
—N/a	156	Doctor Who: The Movie (Note: Available individually or in the Regeneration box set in Region 2)	85 min.	13 August 2001	—N/a	—N/a
—N/a	156	Doctor Who: The Movie (Special Edition) (Note: Only available as part of the Revisitations 1 box set in Region 2. Available individually or in the box set in Region 4. Only available individually in Region 1.)	85 min.	4 October 2010	2 December 2010 (Box set); 3 March 2011 (Individual)	8 February 2011
—N/a	156	Doctor Who: The Movie (Blu-ray Edition)	85 min.	19 September 2016 ^{(B)}	—N/a	—N/a
—N/a	156	Doctor Who: The Movie (Restoration)	89 min.	25 May 2026 ^{(B,UHD)}	—N/a	—N/a

=== Soundtrack release ===
Doctor Who – Original Soundtrack Recording

Soundtrack album by John Debney
- Released: 1997
- Genre: Soundtrack
- Label: John Debney Productions
- Producers: John Debney; John Thaxton

Doctor Who soundtrack chronology
Music from the Tomb of the Cybermen (1997)	Original Soundtrack Recording (1997)	Terror of the Zygons (2000)

Music from the movie was on a promotional-only soundtrack album published by the composer, John Debney. Additional music was contributed by John Sponsler and Louis Febre. Although the composer of the Doctor Who Theme, Ron Grainer, did not receive screen credit for his composition in the TV movie broadcast, the CD finally attributes the proper credit on its cover. The entire score was re-released with previously unreleased cues as the eighth disc of the eleven disc Doctor Who: The 50th Anniversary Collection on 29 September 2014.

==== Track listing ====
All music is composed by John Debney, except where noted.

No.	Title	Length
1.	"Prologue: Skaro" / "'DOCTOR WHO' Theme" (former composed by John Sponsler; latter composed by Ron Grainer)	1:38
2.	"Breakout" (composed by John Sponsler)	2:39
3.	"Wimps" / "Doctor #7 Is Shot" (former composed by John Sponsler; composed by Debney and John Sponsler)	1:44
4.	"Aftermath" (composed by Debney and John Sponsler)	1:09
5.	"X-Ray" / "Snake in the Bathroom" (former composed by John Sponsler; latter composed by Debney and John Sponsler)	1:28
6.	"'Who Am I?'" (composed by Louis Febre)	1:58
7.	"City Scape" (composed by Debney and John Sponsler)	1:07
8.	"Time" (composed by Debney and Louis Febre)	0:58
9.	"Primitive Wiring" / "The Unbruce" (former composed by Louis Febre; latter composed by Debney and Louis Febre)	1:40
10.	"Two Hearts" (composed by Debney and Louis Febre)	1:15
11.	"The Tardis" / "True Identity" (both composed by Debney and Louis Febre)	2:16
12.	"Night Walk" (composed by Debney and Louis Febre)	1:48
13.	"The Eye of Harmony" / "Half Human" (both composed by Louis Febre)	4:39
14.	"Until Midnight" / "Atomic Clock" (both composed by Louis Febre)	2:03
15.	"Green Eyes" (composed by John Sponsler)	0:48
16.	"The Chase" (composed by Debney and John Sponsler)	2:23
17.	"Beryllium Clock" / "Bragg's Key" (both composed by Louis Febre)	1:16
18.	"Slimed" (composed by Debney and Louis Febre)	2:08
19.	"Under the Influence" (composed by Louis Febre)	0:50
20.	"Crown of Nails" (composed by Debney and John Sponsler)	1:16
21.	"Lee's Last Chance" (composed by Debney and John Sponsler)	2:11
22.	"'Open The Eye'" (composed by Debney and John Sponsler)	2:29
23.	""Reroute Power!'" / "Temporal Orbit" (former composed by John Sponsler; latter composed by Debney and Louis Febre)	6:20
24.	"To Hold Death Back" (composed by Debney and Louis Febre)	1:48
25.	"Farewell" (composed by Debney and Louis Febre)	1:38
26.	"End Credits – "DOCTOR WHO" Theme" (composed by Ron Grainer)	0:50

==== CD credits ====
- Music Score produced by John Debney
- Executive album producers: John J. Alcantar III and Thomas C. Stewart
- Music Editor: Laurie Slomka
- CD Edited and mastered by James Nelson at Digital Outland
- CD Art direction: Mark Banning
- Front Cover concept: David Hirsch
- Special Thanks to Ryan K. Johnson

=== In print ===
Season	Story no.	Novelisation title	Author	Original publisher	Paperback release date	Audiobook	
Season	Story no.	Novelisation title	Author	Original publisher	Paperback release date	Release date (Note: Unabridged from BBC Audio / AudioGo unless otherwise indicated)	Narrator
—	156	The Novel of the Film	Gary Russell	BBC Books	15 May 1996	2 June 1997 (abridged)	Paul McGann
—	156	The TV Movie (Note: Revised from the previous publication)	Gary Russell	BBC Books (Target collection)	11 March 2021		Dan Starkey

The television movie was novelised by Gary Russell and published by BBC Books 15 May 1996. It was the first novelisation of a televised Doctor Who story to not be published by Target Books (or related companies) since Doctor Who and the Crusaders in 1966.

Basing the adaptation on an early draft of the script, Russell adjusted some details to make it more consistent with the original series, and the novelisation also contains elements that were cut from the shooting script for timing reasons.

- The novel begins with the Seventh Doctor receiving a telepathic summons from the Master (similar to The Deadly Assassin) to collect his remains from Skaro and a short prologue detailing how the Doctor escapes from the planet with the casket. This was originally intended to be a pre-credits sequence in the movie, and was subsequently contradicted by the ending of the novel Lungbarrow, where Romana gives the Seventh Doctor the assignment to retrieve the Master's remains.
- More detail is given to Chang Lee and Grace's backstory, including his recruitment into the Triads and his seeking a father figure as well as flashbacks to Grace's childhood.
- The Eighth Doctor finds the Seventh Doctor's clothing in the hospital rather than the Fourth Doctor's scarf. Also, the sequence where Chang Lee and the Master see the Seventh Doctor in the Eye of Harmony features all the previous Doctors as originally drafted.
- The scene where the Doctor and Grace meet the motorcycle police officer is relocated to a traffic jam on the Golden Gate Bridge (impossible to film in the movie since it was shot on location in Vancouver).
- When the Doctor first kisses Grace, he immediately pulls back, grins apologetically and murmurs, "I'm sorry, don't know what came over me there." This makes the romantic nature of the kiss more ambiguous. Instead of the second kiss at the end, he gives her the Seventh Doctor's straw hat as a memento.
- The Doctor is still referred to as half-human, to which the Master comments, "The Doctor once claimed to be more than just a Time Lord — He should really have said less than a Time Lord!" This was a reference to a line cut from Remembrance of the Daleks.
- Instead of dying and being brought back to life, Grace and Lee are merely rendered unconscious, though aware of what is happening around them. Russell also spends some time showing the Doctor and them discussing what a "temporal orbit" is.

The novelisation was the first Doctor Who novel published by BBC Books. The book was actually published prior to the conclusion of Virgin Books' contract for publishing original Doctor Who fiction, so the next release by BBC Books did not occur for about a year when the Eighth Doctor Adventures series began with The Eight Doctors. The novelisation was released as a standalone work and is not considered part of this series. The Eighth Doctor Adventures series ran until 2005 when it was discontinued.

The novel was also released as an audio book on 2 June 1997, read by Paul McGann. This reading was later included on the 2004 MP3 CD Tales from the TARDIS Volume Two. A revised Target Books edition titled The TV Movie was published in paperback and as an audiobook 11 March 2021.

== Continuations ==
- Paul McGann made a reappearance as the Eighth Doctor in the 2013 mini-episode "The Night of the Doctor" in which his regeneration was finally explored.
- Eric Roberts reprised the role of the Master in many Big Finish audio plays: Series 5 of "The Diary of River Song", Volume 4 of "Doctor Who: Ravenous", and reprised the role again in "Masterful", a special release celebrating 50 Years since the Master first appeared in "Terror of the Autons" back in 1971. Roberts reprised the role of his incarnation of the Master in Master! two months after the release of Masterful. The box set also starred Chase Masterson as Vienna Salvatorri. Roberts even recorded live-action material of himself playing the Master for the Big Finish YouTube channel.
- Yee Jee Tso returned in 2002 to play Major Jal Brant in the Seventh Doctor audio drama Excelis Decays and Doctor Reece Goddard in the Sixth Doctor webcast Real Time.
- Daphne Ashbrook returned in 2004, alongside Paul McGann, as Perfection in the audio drama The Next Life. In 2026, she also returned to play Hieronyma Friend (a character who takes on the appearance of former companions) in The Eighth Doctor: The Time War 8 once again with Paul McGann. This release also marked the 30th anniversary of the TV Movie by reuniting the two cast-members.
- Tso and Ashbrook returned to Big Finish together playing Captain Ruth Matheson and Warrant Officer Charlie Sato of UNIT in the audio dramas Tales From The Vault and Mastermind, both part of the Companions Chronicles series, in 2011 and 2013.
