= Space and Time (Doctor Who) =

"Space" and "Time"
- Doctor Who episodes
- The TARDIS inside itself and two Amy Ponds. The effect was achieved by filming the sequence twice with actress Karen Gillan and her double, and then merging the two halves together so it was only Gillan.

Cast
- Doctor: Matt Smith – Eleventh Doctor
- Companions: Karen Gillan – Amy Pond; Arthur Darvill – Rory Williams

Production
- Directed by: Richard Senior
- Written by: Steven Moffat
- Produced by: Annabella Hurst-Brown
- Executive producers: Steven Moffat; Piers Wenger; Beth Willis
- Music by: Murray Gold
- Running time: 2 episodes, 3 minutes each
- First broadcast: 18 March 2011

Chronology
← Preceded by "A Christmas Carol"	Followed by → "The Impossible Astronaut"

"Space" and "Time" (later known simply as "Time, Part One" and "Two") are two mini-episodes of the British science fiction television series Doctor Who. Written by the programme's head writer Steven Moffat and directed by Richard Senior, the mini-episodes were broadcast on 18 March 2011 as part of BBC One's Red Nose Day telethon for the charity Comic Relief.

The episodes form a two-part story, set entirely within the TARDIS, starring Matt Smith as the Doctor, and Karen Gillan and Arthur Darvill as married couple Amy Pond and Rory Williams. Rory, helping the Doctor work on the TARDIS, looks up the glass floor surrounding the console and becomes distracted by Amy's short skirt, causing him to drop the thermal couplings he was holding. This causes the three to be stuck in a "space loop" where the TARDIS materializes inside the TARDIS.

"Space" and "Time" were filmed in two days alongside the sixth series DVD Night and the Doctor extras "Bad Night" and "Good Night". The episodes are intended to show what life aboard the TARDIS would be like. Several editing techniques and doubles were used for the various shots where there were more than one of the same character on the screen. The mini-episodes received mixed reviews; some scenes were thought to be funny, but other jokes were criticised for relying on sexist humour. "Space" and "Time" were later released on the DVD and Blu-ray sets of the sixth series.

== Plot ==
=== "Space" ===
Amy is trying to get the Doctor's attention while he fixes the TARDIS. She discovers that her husband Rory is helping the Doctor by installing thermal couplings underneath the glass floor of the TARDIS. Rory and Amy then start a small argument about Amy cheating when she took her driving test, when the TARDIS suddenly shakes and the lights go out. The Doctor asks Rory if he dropped a thermal coupling, which Rory admits to and apologises for doing. Amy then apologises as well and, at the Doctor's confusion, explains that Rory was looking up her skirt through the glass floor when he dropped the thermal coupling. The Doctor then notes that they have landed through "emergency materialisation" which should have landed the TARDIS in the safest space available. The lights come on, revealing another TARDIS inside the control room — the TARDIS has materialised inside itself. The Doctor experimentally walks through the door of the TARDIS inside the control room and instantly walks back into the control room through the door of the outer TARDIS. The Doctor tells Rory and Amy that they are trapped in a "space loop" and that nothing can enter or exit the TARDIS ever again. Despite the Doctor's words, another Amy enters through the TARDIS door saying, "Okay, kids, this is where it gets complicated."

=== "Time" ===
The other Amy reveals that she is from a few moments in the future, and is able to come into the current outer TARDIS because "the exterior shell of the TARDIS has drifted forwards in time". The other Amy knows what to say and do because, from her perspective, she is repeating what she heard herself say earlier on. The Doctor sends the current Amy into the TARDIS within the current TARDIS, in order to maintain the timeline. The two Amys take a moment to flirt with each other before the current one departs, much to the Doctor's exasperation. However, not long after the current Amy has left, Rory and Amy enter through the door of outer TARDIS explaining that the Doctor, from their perspective, has just sent them into the inner TARDIS. The current Doctor promptly sends the current Rory and the now-current Amy through the inner TARDIS. The Doctor then explains that he will set up a "controlled temporal implosion" in order to "reset the TARDIS", but in order to do so he must know which lever to use on the control panel. Moments after he speaks, another Doctor enters through the outer TARDIS door and tells him to use "the wibbly lever", which he quickly operates, then steps into the inner TARDIS to tell his past self which lever to use. The inner TARDIS dematerialises while the outer TARDIS (being the same TARDIS) does the same, and the Doctor assures Amy and Rory that they are now back in normal flight, and then advises Amy to put some trousers on.

== Production ==
Doctor Who had previously aired two related specials for Comic Relief. The first was the 1999 spoof The Curse of Fatal Death, which was also written by Steven Moffat. The spin-off series The Sarah Jane Adventures produced its own mini-episode "From Raxacoricofallapatorius with Love" for the 2009 Comic Relief appeal. Unlike The Curse of Fatal Death, "Space" and "Time" are considered to be canonical. The canonicity of the two mini-episodes was affirmed by Moffat in Doctor Who Magazine. Moffat stated that, unlike The Curse of Fatal Death, "Space" and "Time" is not a spoof or a sketch, but rather "a little miniature story" in the style of the Children in Need mini-episodes. He described it as "A moment of life aboard the TARDIS. But obviously life about the TARDIS instantly gets you into terrible jeopardy, and all of causality is threatened. As I'm sure it is every day when they get up and have their coffee..." The concept of a TARDIS inside the TARDIS had been previously explored in The Time Monster (1972) and Logopolis (1980), though both times it was the TARDIS of the Master. Amy also repeats one of her lines from "The Big Bang" at the end of "Space".

The special was shot over two days alongside the made-for-DVD Night and the Doctor mini-episodes "Bad Night" and "Good Night". It was mostly shot on the first day, where all of the scenes with the TARDIS inside the TARDIS were filmed. Several tricks were used to create the illusion that there were more than one Doctor, Amy, and/or Rory. In scenes where the camera had to move between the double characters, a "whip-pan" was used twice, with the actor in a different place each time. The two shots were then edited together into one seamless take. For scenes where there were more than one of the same character in the same shot, such as the two Amys in front of the TARDIS, the camera was held very still and the scene was filmed twice, with the actor's double filling in for the part they were not playing. The doubles were also used briefly in scenes where the characters' backs were to the camera, such as when the Doctor, Amy, and Rory watched the future Amy and Rory enter the TARDIS.

== Broadcast, release and reception ==
"Space" and "Time" were broadcast during the Comic Relief Red Nose Day telethon on 18 March 2011 on BBC One. The telethon was watched by 10.26 million viewers. The BBC posted the episode in two parts on their official YouTube channel. The mini episodes were included as bonus features in the Complete Sixth Series DVD and Blu-ray box set, released on 21 November 2011 (Region 2) and 22 November 2011 (Region 1).

Lucy Mangan of The Guardian responded positively, noting it "manages brilliantly to nod to just about every Whovian in-joke, demographic and fetish within the span of two tiny instalments". The A.V. Club reviewer Christopher Bahn opined that the two Amys in "Space" and "Time" were "a lot more fun to watch" than the two in the sixth series episode "The Girl Who Waited". Tor.com's Teresa Jusino, who had been positive towards Amy's character in the past, was disappointed that the ending of the miniepisodes relied on "too-easy, dated, sexist humor". She cited the fact that Rory dropping the coupling was blamed on Amy's short skirt rather than Rory himself, which implied that she had a "responsibility to cover up, because 'men will be men'". In Who is the Doctor, a guide to the revived series, Robert Smith wrote that the episode was "cute, plotted to perfection and ends precisely when it should, before it has the chance to outstay its welcome". He said that the episodes used Amy well, as it did not make her unlikable. On the other hand, his coauthor Graeme Burk said that the story was "derivative and lazy" and a "missed opportunity". He likened the plot to that of Red Dwarf's "Future Echoes", and felt that Moffat could have written something better and funnier. Like Jusino, he thought that the "blokey humor" was "misplaced", denying a broad audience appeal and leading to the sexist last line: "Pond, put some trousers on!". Despite this, both Jusino and Burk enjoyed the scene where Amy flirts with herself.
