= Philip Segal =

British-American television producer (born 1964)

- Born: 1962 (age 63–64); Essex, England
- Education: San Diego State University
- Occupation: Television producer

Philip David Segal (born 1962 in Southend-on-Sea, Essex, England) is a British-American television producer. He emigrated to the United States "at the age of fifteen or sixteen", where he gained a degree in Telecommunications from San Diego State University. After graduating he started work in the US television industry, first as a casting assistant and then as a literary agent, working at Fenton Feinberg Casting and the ICM TV Literary Department training program.

In 1985, he was appointed Director of Drama Development at Columbia Pictures. He then moved to ABC Television as a programming executive, and says he worked on shows such as Twin Peaks, Thirtysomething and China Beach.

In 1989, he went to the BBC where he had a chat about the TV industry and asked about work on different shows, one of the ones he was most interested in was science fiction series Doctor Who. A week later, plans for a 1990 season of Doctor Who were aborted while the BBC searched for an American company to make a new series as a joint venture.

In 1991, he joined Steven Spielberg's Amblin Entertainment, where he became Vice President of Amblin Television, overseeing the production of seaQuest DSV, Earth 2 and The Young Indiana Jones Chronicles.

Segal contacted the BBC, applying for the distribution rights of a new series of Doctor Who under Amblin. Collaborating with fellow English expatriate Peter Wagg (producer of Max Headroom) they created the early drafts of what eventually became the Doctor Who television movie in 1996. Segal received an executive producer credit on the movie. In 2000, Segal co-wrote the book Doctor Who: Regeneration with Gary Russell (HarperCollins, ISBN 0-00-710591-6), the making-of book about the movie.

Segal won the best director of a short film award from the NY International Film & Video Festival in 2000 for his short story The Other Side of Monday. Other directing credits include: a single episode of Mutant X according to IMDB and one episode of Andromeda for the Tribune Action Hours, and the feature film Hobbs End which he also co-wrote with Eric Truheart. In 2000 he became senior VP for scripted programming and development at Tribune Entertainment, overseeing Andromeda, Beastmaster and other shows.

After a period working at Bunim-Murray Productions as Executive Vice-President, Segal joined Original Productions in 2006 as an executive producer. He was appointed Chief Executive Officer of Original in 2012 but left the company in 2017 when Original's parent company, Fremantle, decided not to renew his contract. His credits include Ice Road Truckers and Ax Men for The History Channel, The Colony, Pitchmen, Swords: Life on the Line for Discovery Channel, 1000 Ways to Die for Spike, Black Gold for Tru TV, Wildlife Warriors and Cut in Half for National Geographic Channel, and Storage Wars for A&E. Segal lives in Glendale, California and in Medford, Oregon.
