= List of Blue Peter presenters =

List of presenters of the British television programme

Blue Peter is a British children's television programme created by John Hunter Blair. The first programme was broadcast on 16 October 1958. It is the longest-running children's television programme in the world, and also one of the longest-running television programmes in the world.

Blue Peter currently airs weekly on Fridays in the United Kingdom on CBBC, a digital television channel. The show is produced in a magazine format, often transmitting live, and features a combination of studio presentation, interviews and outside broadcasting items. There have been forty-five official presenters of Blue Peter.

== History ==
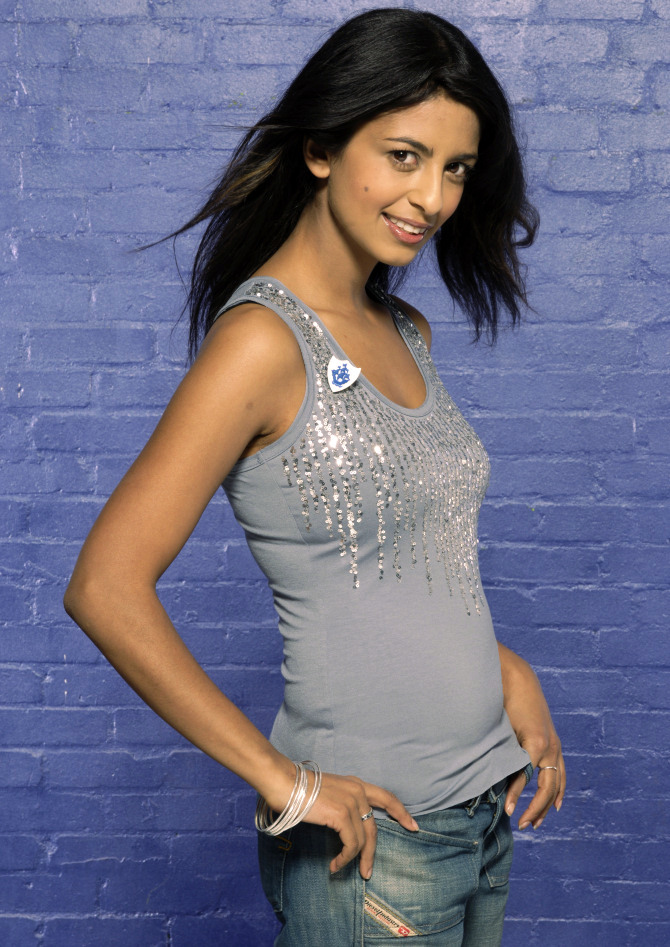
Konnie Huq, the 26th presenter, was the longest-serving continuing female presenter, from 1997 to 2008.

The first presenters of Blue Peter were Christopher Trace and Leila Williams. Trace presented for nearly nine years, and Williams for just over three years (although no footage of her has been retained by the BBC). In the early days, as the show ran continuously on a weekly basis, other presenters occasionally stepped in to give the regular team a break. Artist Tony Hart and actress Ann Taylor both presented the show either in place of either Trace or Williams, or sometimes in place of both, with Taylor replacing Williams for six weeks in 1959 and presenting the show at least once alone, as did Hart.

When Williams was dismissed from the show in 1962 following a series of spats with a newly appointed producer, Trace continued to present the show alone or with one-off presenters until a replacement was found. The role went to Anita West, who presented sixteen editions over a four-month period in 1962—the shortest tenure of any full-time presenter—before abruptly resigning due to her imminent divorce, something she had not revealed to the producers. Her tenure was so short that no footage from her time on Blue Peter exists in the BBC Archives, although footage of her audition remains, along with that of Valerie Singleton and other auditioners. It was not until 1998 that West was officially recognised as a former presenter.

John Noakes was the longest-serving presenter, having presented the show for over twelve years, and Konnie Huq is the longest-serving female presenter, with a tenure of over ten years, beating Valerie Singleton by three months. However, although Singleton left the series full-time in 1972 to present the spin-off series Blue Peter Special Assignment, she continued to be an occasional presenter until 1975. Singleton's last 'official' appearance on the show came on 20 October 1975 although she was also credited with appearing on the 1975 'review of the year' programme, broadcast on 29 December 1975.

Singleton made the first of her many returns to the programme in January 1976 following the death of the first Blue Peter cat, Jason. She also returned to Blue Peter on 16 October 1978 to co-present the live UK TV balloon release for the 20th anniversary. Singleton presented her last Special Assignment in May 1981, and returned to co-present Blue Peter to moderate the live UK TV link-up to launch the 25th Silver Anniversary balloon hunt on 17 October 1983; these additions make her total presenting span 21 years. Sandra Michaels presented the show twice in April 1964 in the absence of Singleton, and impressed producer Edward Barnes enough that he considered her as a replacement for Singleton; however, Michaels turned this down and he opted to carry on with Singleton, something he admitted in hindsight he was glad he did. The youngest presenter of Blue Peter was Yvette Fielding, who was eighteen when she began presenting, and the oldest was John Noakes, who was forty-four when he left. Only one presenter, Peter Duncan, had two stints of presenting, his first being from 1980 to 1984, and his second being from 1985 to 1986.

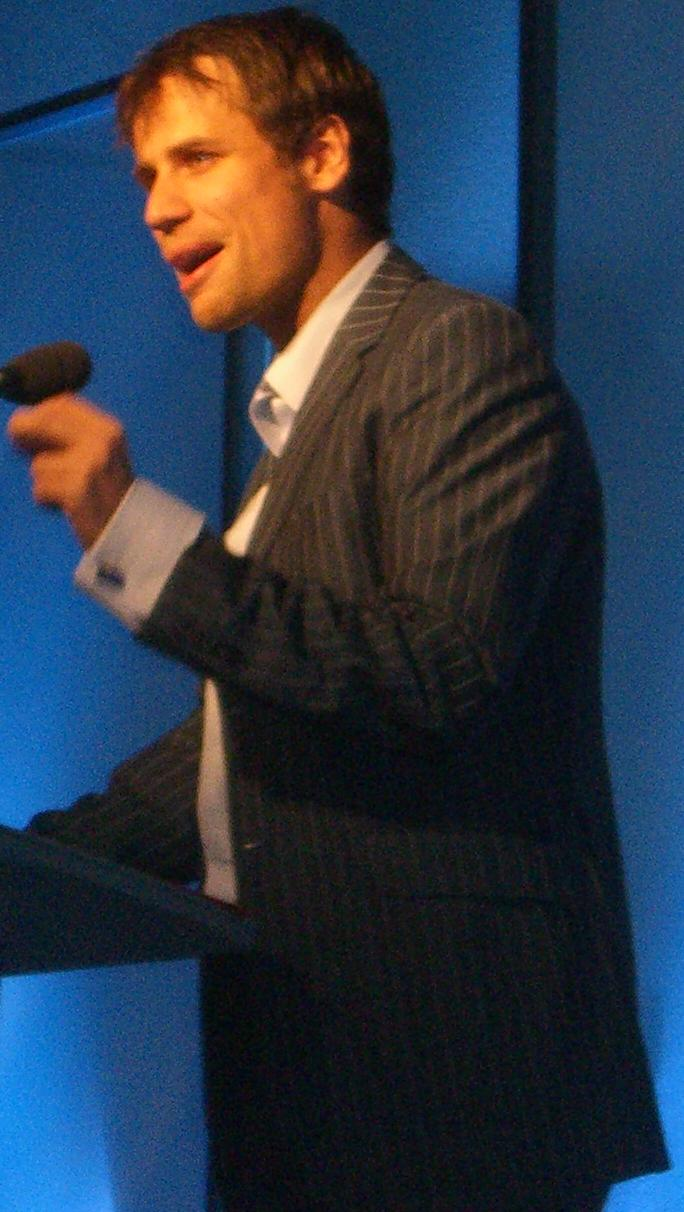
Richard Bacon, the 25th presenter from 1997 to 1998, is the only presenter to have his contract terminated mid-run.

The only presenter to have been fired from Blue Peter mid-contract is Richard Bacon, who was dismissed from the show in 1998 after it emerged that he had taken cocaine. A number of other presenters have garnered negative publicity for aspects of their private lives, which has been described in some sections of the British media as the "curse of Blue Peter". Nevertheless, many of the show's former presenters have continued to work in the media. Indeed, Bacon's career survived his dismissal; he has since presented The Big Breakfast and Top of the Pops among numerous other radio and television shows, some of which were for the BBC.

Following its move to Salford in September 2011, Blue Peter had a format with two permanent presenters, Helen Skelton and Barney Harwood, supplemented by guest presenters for particular topics, such as Naomi Wilkinson for wildlife.

On 4 March 2013, the BBC announced that it was searching for a new presenter to start in the summer of 2013. They announced that CBBC stars Dick and Dom would be hosting a new TV show to find the next presenter. The show began on 24 June as Blue Peter – You Decide! The judges were Myleene Klass, Eamonn Holmes and Cel Spellman. The winner was chosen after five weeks of competition, via a public vote. On 25 July 2013, it was announced that 22-year-old Lindsey Russell had won the public vote to become Blue Peter's 36th presenter.

On 8 August 2013, Skelton announced on air that she was leaving the show in September after five years, to be replaced by Radzi Chinyanganya.

Harwood left the programme on 14 September 2017. Chinyanganya left after five-and-a-half years on 18 April 2019. On 26 April, Chinyanganya's replacement was announced as Richie Driss. It was announced on 13 May 2020 that Mwaksy Mudenda would join Russell and Driss, returning the show to a three-presenter format. On 1 September 2020, Adam Beales was announced as the show's 40th presenter.

On 24 June 2021, Russell announced she would be leaving the programme, with her last appearance on 15 July 2021. On 17 June 2022, Beales announced that he would be leaving, with his last appearance to be aired on 15 July 2022. Joel Mawhinney became the 41st presenter on 11 November 2022, following a recent stint of guest presenting during the summer.

On 3 February 2023, Driss announced that after 4 years he would leave the show, with his last show to be aired on 3 March. His replacement, Abby Cook, became the 42nd presenter on the following episode, aired on 10 March 2023. Mudenda departed in September 2023; she was replaced four months later by Shini Muthukrishnan. On 17 July 2025, it was announced that puppet character Hacker T Dog (Phil Fletcher) would become a part of the presenting team starting on 5 September 2025. On 24 April 2026, Mawhinney announced he would be leaving the show this summer. On 10 October 2026, content creator Leo Olsson was announced as the 45th presenter and is expected to join the programme on 20 November 2026.

== Presenters ==
=== Relief ===
| No. | Presenter | Tenure began | Tenure ended | Length | Ref(s) |
|---|---|---|---|---|---|
| * | Ann Taylor | 17 September 1959 | 11 December 1959 | 85 days | (Note: Taylor presented the show alongside Trace for six weeks in 1959 for an absent Williams and often replaced Williams on other occasions, even presenting the show alone at least once.) |
| * | Tony Hart | 13 November 1959 | 20 November 1959 | 7 days | (Note: Hart co-presented two early editions of the show, including hosting at least one in 1959 in place of both Trace and Williams.) |
| * | Sandra Michaels | 20 April 1964 | 27 April 1964 | 7 days | (Note: Michaels presented two episodes on 20 and 27 April 1964 with Trace, while Singleton was on holiday.) |

=== Official ===
| No. | Presenter | Tenure began | Tenure ended | Length | Ref(s) |
|---|---|---|---|---|---|
| 1 | Christopher Trace | 16 October 1958 | 24 July 1967 | 8 years, 281 days | |
| 2 | Leila Williams | 16 October 1958 | 8 January 1962 | 3 years, 84 days | (Note: Williams was absent from many episodes in 1959, and more often leading up to her final appearance.) |
| 3 | Anita West | 7 May 1962 | 3 September 1962 | 119 days | |
| 4 | Valerie Singleton | 3 September 1962 | 29 December 1975 | 13 years, 117 days (Note: Singleton left the series full-time in 1972 but continued to make occasional guest appearances in the studio and was a presenter for most series of Blue Peter Special Assignment until 1981) | |
| 5 | John Noakes | 30 December 1965 | 26 June 1978 | 12 years, 178 days | |
| 6 | Peter Purves | 16 November 1967 | 23 March 1978 | 10 years, 127 days | |
| 7 | Lesley Judd | 15 May 1972 | 12 April 1979 | 6 years, 342 days | |
| 8 | Simon Groom | 15 May 1978 | 23 June 1986 | 8 years, 39 days | |
| 9 | Christopher Wenner | 14 September 1978 | 23 June 1980 | 1 year, 283 days | |
| 10 | Tina Heath | 5 April 1979 | 23 June 1980 | 1 year, 79 days | |
| 11 | Sarah Greene | 19 May 1980 | 27 June 1983 | 3 years, 39 days | (Note: Greene returned to cover for Janet Ellis in 1984, after Ellis injured her pelvis during a parachute landing.) |
| 12 | Peter Duncan | 11 September 1980 | 18 June 1984 | 3 years, 281 days | |
| 13 | Janet Ellis | 28 April 1983 | 29 June 1987 | 4 years, 62 days | |
| 14 | Michael Sundin | 13 September 1984 | 24 June 1985 | 284 days | |
| * | Peter Duncan | 9 September 1985 | 27 November 1986 | 1 year, 79 days | |
| 15 | Mark Curry | 23 June 1986 | 26 June 1989 | 3 years, 3 days | |
| 16 | Caron Keating | 13 November 1986 | 22 January 1990 | 3 years, 70 days | |
| 17 | Yvette Fielding | 29 June 1987 | 29 June 1992 | 5 years, 0 days | (Note: Fielding stepped in as a temporary replacement for Richard Bacon in 1998, following Bacon's dismissal.) |
| 18 | John Leslie | 20 April 1989 | 20 January 1994 | 4 years, 275 days | |
| 19 | Diane-Louise Jordan | 25 January 1990 | 26 February 1996 | 6 years, 32 days | |
| 20 | Anthea Turner | 14 September 1992 | 27 June 1994 | 1 year, 286 days | |
| 21 | Tim Vincent | 16 December 1993 | 24 January 1997 | 3 years, 39 days | |
| 22 | Stuart Miles | 27 June 1994 | 21 June 1999 | 4 years, 359 days | |
| 23 | Katy Hill | 23 June 1995 | 19 June 2000 | 4 years, 362 days | |
| 24 | Romana D'Annunzio | 1 March 1996 | 20 February 1998 | 1 year, 356 days | |
| 25 | Richard Bacon | 21 February 1997 | 16 October 1998 | 1 year, 237 days | |
| 26 | Konnie Huq | 1 December 1997 | 23 January 2008 | 10 years, 53 days | |
| 27 | Simon Thomas | 8 January 1999 | 25 April 2005 | 6 years, 107 days | |
| 28 | Matt Baker | 25 June 1999 | 26 June 2006 | 7 years, 1 day | |
| 29 | Liz Barker | 23 June 2000 | 10 April 2006 | 5 years, 291 days | |
| 30 | Zoe Salmon | 23 December 2004 | 25 June 2008 | 3 years, 185 days | |
| 31 | Gethin Jones | 26 April 2005 | 25 June 2008 | 3 years, 60 days | |
| 32 | Ayo Akinwolere | 28 June 2006 | 28 June 2011 | 5 years, 0 days | |
| 33 | Helen Skelton | 23 September 2008 | 26 September 2013 | 5 years, 3 days | |
| 34 | Joel Defries | 23 September 2008 | 14 December 2010 | 2 years, 82 days | |
| 35 | Barney Harwood | 17 January 2011 | 14 September 2017 | 6 years, 240 days | |
| 36 | Lindsey Russell | 5 September 2013 | 15 July 2021 | 7 years, 355 days | |
| 37 | Radzi Chinyanganya | 17 October 2013 | 18 April 2019 | 5 years, 183 days | |
| 38 | Richie Driss | 16 May 2019 | 3 March 2023 | 3 years, 291 days | |
| 39 | Mwaksy Mudenda | 14 May 2020 | 29 September 2023 | 3 years, 138 days | |
| 40 | Adam Beales | 3 September 2020 | 15 July 2022 | 1 year, 315 days | |
| 41 | Joel Mawhinney | 11 November 2022 | 3 July 2026 | 3 years, 234 days | |
| 42 | Abby Cook‡ | 10 March 2023 | present | 3 years, 256 days | |
| 43 | Shini Muthukrishnan‡ | 19 January 2024 | present | 2 years, 306 days | |
| 44 | Hacker T Dog‡ | 5 September 2025 | present | 1 year, 77 days | (Note: Puppet character, portrayed by Phil Fletcher.) |
| 45 | Leo Olsson‡ | 20 November 2026 | present | 1 day | |

Key
‡ Current Blue Peter presenters
