= List of Blue Peter episodes =

Blue Peter is a British children's television program, shown live on the CBBC channel. It first aired in 1958 and is the longest-running children's TV show in the world. Although the show has a nautical title and theme, it is a magazine/entertainment show containing viewer and presenter challenges, as well as art and craft creations.

This is a list of Blue Peter episodes listed by year.

episodes:

1. Blue Peter! (1958)
2. Blue Peter II: Welcoming Visit (1958)
3. Blue Peter III (1958)
4. Blue Peter IV (1958)
5. Blue Peter V (1958)
6. Blue Peter VI (1958)
7. Blue Peter VII: Boogie Dance (1958)
8. Blue Peter VIII (1958)
9. Blue Peter IX (1958)

== 1958 ==
No.	Original release date
1	16 October 1958
2	23 October 1958
3	30 October 1958
4	6 November 1958
5	13 November 1958
6	20 November 1958
7	27 November 1958
8	4 December 1958
9	11 December 1958
10	18 December 1958
11	25 December 1958

== 2005 ==
No.	Title	Original release date
1	"The Golden Eyes"	25 January 2005
Liz was joined by an animal manager from Woburn Safari Park and 3 Malaysian Giant Pond Turtles and Zoe & Chris Springwatch for the biggest ever survey into the arrival of spring across the UK, run by the BBC in association with the Woodland Trust.And there's a struggle to save Summer from wreckage...But then Konnie gets involved and things get really WEIRD and thrilling!
2	"The twisted day"	28 January 2005
Matt travels to Cambodia. He walks the streets of the ancient cities, try's a food specialty of the region, Giant Spiders, and goes to see old museum full of war memories from the past.
3	"Very silly!"	31 January 2005
Matt travels to America to be taught wrestling for another of his sporting challenges, Konnie spins some plates on sticks with guest, Andrew, and Zoe takes her first pancake challenge!
6	"The Brain of Blue Peter"	7 February 2005
Simon Presents a new Interactive; Quiz Zoe's Team The Chocahollicks; Matt's Team The Gaming Wizards; Liz's Team The Animal Lovers; Konnie's Team The Fashion Freaks - Round One - Famous People Round Two - Illusions, Round Three - Music, Round Four - Observation.
7	"Results of The Brain of Blue Peter"	9 February 2005
The Results Show of the Interactive Quiz, The fashion freaks won, the gaming wizards second, the animal lovers third and the chocalicks forth.
8	"Doctor Who Special"	21 March 2005
Christopher Eccleston and Billie Piper, the stars of the new series of Doctor Who, join Matt, Liz and Simon today to talk about the show and what going to happen. Also, Simon and Liz join a professional swimming technique team, plus in the studio Simon makes an Easter Chick out of dough. But when the plan to show it and become famous for two of them goes awry, what will they do next?
9	"Comic Relief Special"	11 March 2005
McFly came into the studio and performed their Comic Relief song. They also took the time to do a quick interview for the website. Dawn French Comedienne Dawn French joined us to talk about how the money raised for Comic Relief gets used and how much is expected to be raised in 2005. Konnie in Uganda Konnie also travelled to Uganda recently to make a film about how children there are benefitting from the money raised by Comic Relief
10	"4000th Episode"	14 March 2005
'Mary Poppins' is currently playing at the Prince Edward Theatre in London. You would probably expect actor Ewan McGregor to travel through space to be with us, or to ride in to the studio on a motorbike, but not on Blue Peter. On today's show, he was transported into the studio on a three and a half metre tall shopping trolley!
11	"007: James Bond Special!"	23 March 2005
James Bond Special All the presenters get dressed up and perform some of the classic Bond theme tunes: 'The Man with the Golden Gun', 'For Your Eyes Only', 'Diamonds Are Forever', 'View to a Kill' and 'Nobody Does it Better'.Meanwhile Liz and Simon go to ""Spy School"" to learn the tricks of the trade that real spies use. Meanwhile Matt interviews Charlie Higson, author of ""Silverfin"", which tells the story of James Bond as a boy.Meanwhile, Zöe and Konnie dressed up as the famous Bond Girls Shirley Eaton and Ursula Andres.But when the interview, The sessions at spy school and the party go awry, they escape with their lives?
16	"Blue Peter Championships (1)"	30 March 2005
The Blue Peter Championship Part 1- The Reds: Liz Barker, Chris Collins, Barney Harwood, Nick Baker, Dani Harmer; The Greens: Matt Baker, Zöe Salmom, Gemma Hunt, Mark Speight, Chris Perry-Metcalf.
17	"Blue Peter Championships (2)"	1 April 2005
The winner is the Greens!
23	"Meet Gethin Jones!"	27 April 2005
Superheroes In the studio today, Konnie, Matt, Liz and Zöe got all togged up in their superhero costumes and uncovered a few of the tricks of the film trade that give ordinary actors their superpowers. Blue Peter's 31st presenter, Gethin Jones, makes his first appearance dressed as Batman!
24	"Last Live Show of the Series and goodbye Matt!"	20 April 2005
The presenters tried out the next Text me home tent, which lights up when you text it. Matt and Zöe's jive Following on from last Friday's dance special, Matt and Zöe performed their jive again, due to popular demand. Watch the challenge and see how Matt and Zöe got on. Doctor Who Matt went behind the scenes of this Saturday's ""Doctor Who"", when the Doctor comes face to face with his oldest, and most deadly enemy, the Dalek And we say goodbye to Matt
25	"Farewell Simon!"	25 April 2005
After 6 and a halr years, Simon Says Goodbye to Blue Peter
26	"Simon Thomas: The Best Bits (1)"	2 May 2005
Relive so of Simon's best bits. Part 1
27	"Simon Thomas: The Best Bits (2)"	4 May 2005
Relive some more of Simon's memories.
38	"Morocco, The Land of the Setting Sun"	20 July 2005
39	"The Colours of Morocco"	21 July 2005
43	"There's a Nomad In My house (1)"	27 July 2005
44	"There's a Nomad In My house (2)"	28 July 2005
48	"Hello Vietnam"	3 August 2005
49	"Vietnam Journey To Tai Cha"	4 August 2005
53	"Australia, Outback"	10 August 2005
54	"Sunny Spain"	11 August 2005
57	"Big Brazilian Oi"	16 August 2005
61	"Giants and Gemstones"	24 August 2005
63	"Incredible India"	30 August 2005
68	"One Mat and His Meg"	8 September 2005
75	"Mat and the Marines"	22 September 2005
79	"Japan, Konichiwa Nippon"	30 September 2005
82	"National Poet Day Special"	6 October 2005
85	"Japan, Land of the Rising Sun"	11 October 2005
86	"Highlands and Islands"	12 October 2005
87	"A Year In Gear, Swedish Rally Driving"	13 October 2005
95	"Goodbye Liz"	25 October 2005
115	"Narnia Special"	2 December 2005
124	"Totally Blue Peter (1)"	19 December 2005
125	"Totally Blue Peter (2)"	20 December 2005
127	"Christmas Show"	23 December 2005
128	"Christmas Presents"	25 December 2005
129	"Winter in Norway"	27 December 2005
130	"Review of the Year"	30 December 2005

== 2016 ==
Presented by Barney Harwood, Lindsey Russell and Radzi Chinyanganya every Thursday

No.	Title	Original release date
1	"All New For 2016!"	5 January 2016
HIGHLIGHTS: Radzi goes behind the scenes at the Sports Personality of the Year Awards and the team looks back at the best bits from the last 12 months.
2	"The Next Step Live!"	14 January 2016
LIVE
3	"Get Your Purple Badge"	21 January 2016
LIVE: PURPLE BADGE SHOW: The team are celebrating the Purple badge! The viewers are in control and the whole show will be dedicated with the things that they love and want to see on the show.
4	"Out of This World"	28 January 2016
5	"Brand New Competition"	7 February 2017
The team launch a huge new sporting competition. Sir Chris Hoy sets a speedy cycle challenge for Barney and Radzi in aid of Sport Relief.
6	"Valentine's & Sport Relief Cycle Challenge!"	11 February 2016
Barney competes in the annual Great Olney Pancake Race and Barney and Radzi put pedal to the metal in the second part of their Sport Relief cycle challenge.
7	TBA	18 February 2016
8	"The Wave Runner Begins"	25 February 2016
It's the first part of Lindsey's epic Sport Relief challenge, and the top three Best Story nominees for the Blue Peter Book Awards 2016 are announced.
9	"Books, Books, Books!"	3 March 2016
Mary Poppins visits the studio for a performance. Barney travels to Munich and chats to British astronaut Tim Peake. Also, Angellica Bell reveals the Blue Peter Book Award winners.
10	"A Batmobile, A Kung Fu Panda and A Wave Runner!"	10 March 2016
Lindsey continues her Sport Relief Challenge, Radzi and Lindsey go behind the scenes of Kung Fu Panda, and Barney takes a ride in the Batmobile.
11	"Sports Relief Special"	17 March 2016
The team are live from Queen Elizabeth Olympic Park for a Sport Relief special. It is the final part to Lindsey's epic wave-runner challenge.
12	"Lindsey's Epic Sport Relief Challenge"	24 March 2016
All the action from Lindsey Russell's wave runner challenge, as she attempted to run across the Irish Sea in a three-metre inflatable ball - all in aid of Sport Relief.
13	"Goodbye Barney and Radzi"	31 March 2016
After 3 years Radzi leaves the show along with Barney after 5 years
14	"It's All About the Badge"	7 April 2016
Radzi goes behind the scenes on the set of CBBC's Wolfblood to see Blue Peter competition badge winner Myah in her starring role. US pop group JAGMAC perform live in the studio.
15	"Rocket-Fuelled Fun"	14 April 2016
The team plant rocket seeds that have been to the International Space Station.
16	"Competition Winner & Shakespeare"	21 April 2016
The team reveal the 2016 Team GB Blue Peter sport badge and Radzi joins the Royal Shakespeare Company to take part in a performance of A Midsummer Night's Dream.
17	"Get Your Team GB Sport Badge!"	28 April 2016
Find out how to get the brand new Team GB sport badge, with some help from some famous sport stars. Plus Lindsey takes on a hockey challenge and Radzi attempts a roller derby.
18	"Brand New Dream Big Competition!"	5 May 2016
Blue Peter guide dog Iggy meets her new owner, the team launch a brand new competition and Ashley and Pudsey perform in the studio.
19	"Big News!"	16 May 2016
We say hello to Blue Peter Presenter Number 39 Richien Driss
20	"The Big Fan Club Takeover!"	19 May 2016
This episode of Blue Peter is a fan club takeover, where viewers can control the show via the Blue Peter Fan Club. Featuring live online votes, viewer comments.
21	"Space Spectacular"	26 May 2016
Lindsey experiences what it is like to float like an astronaut and fly like a superhero in a zero-gravity plane. Also there is a recap of how our space rocket seeds are growing.
22	"Goes Greener"	2 June 2016
LIVE: GREEN BADGE SHOW: The team present a green badge special live from the Blue Peter garden, which has been given a makeover by a young gardening expert.
23	"A Big Surprise & Matilda Ramsay!"	9 June 2016
Lindsey and Radzi try their hand at indoor skydiving. Also, Tilly Ramsay gets ready for Father's Day with a special bake
24	"World Records & Flying High!"	16 June 2016
Radzi takes to the skies over Buckingham Palace to celebrate the Queen's 90th Birthday. A football freestyler attempts a new world record.
25	"The Big Bug Show!"	23 June 2016
The team gets up close and personal with some supersized creepy-crawlies and Radzi Chinyanganya chats to the stars of Secret Life of Pets. Plus, how to make a Shelley Pinata.
26	"Secrets of Film and TV!"	30 June 2016
The Blue Peter team takes a look at some tricks of the film and TV trade.
27	"Super Sport Badge Sportacular!"	7 July 2016
The team meet the Paralympic team, who have won a staggering 143 medals. Lindsey gets to grips with the science behind the Wimbledon Tennis Championships.
28	"Loves Books!"	14 July 2016
The team celebrate the art of words through books, poems, letters and music! Lindsey reads out some of your Blue Peter letters at the prestigious Letters Live. Radzi visits the team behind Gangsta Granny and Barney shows you how to make an ingenious bookmark for your favourite book. Plus nine-year-old author Toby Little tells us all about his adventures in writing!
29	"Live Awesome Authors"	16 July 2016
Blue Peter is live from Centenary Square in Birmingham, for the special CBBC Awesome Authors weekend! The team quiz a host of authors, including Holly Smale and David O'Doherty, with viewers' questions, and they create a story live on stage. Lindsey visits the Hay Book festival and we reveal the winner of the Dream Big competition.
30	"Awesome Authors"	17 July 2016
Blue Peter has more from the special CBBC Awesome Authors weekend. We put Jacqueline Wilson to the test in a quiz against a team of superfans! Authors such as David Baddiel and Alex Smith join in with fun and games and Lindsey reads viewers' letters at Letters Live.
31	"Dream Big Orange Badge Show"	31 July 2016
ORANGE BADGE SHOW: The Blue Peter team meet the Paralympic team who have won 143 medals. Lindsey gets to grips with the science behind the Wimbledon Tennis Championships. Also, the team are joined by a host of sporting heroes.
32	"Summer Badge Baton Relay Challenge!"	28 July 2016
The Blue Peter team kick-start the summer badge baton relay, where they challenge viewers to earn all their Blue Peter badges, starting with the blue badge! To celebrate, Lindsey and Radzi get a head for heights by being strapped to a plane and attempt a wing walking challenge involving passing a baton to each other! Will they succeed? Also, how to make a badge baton to store badges, and the team surprise a viewer by delivering a Blue Peter badge!
33	"Get Your Sport Badge!"	4 August 2016
The Blue Peter badge baton-relay continues with the sport badge 2016. Don't miss an exclusive look behind the scenes at the official kitting-out of Team GB. Also, Barney, Lindsey and Radzi try their hand at the Brazilian sport of footvolley.
34	"Go Green and Get Your Badge!"	11 August 2016
It's a Green badge special, jam-packed with UK wildlife. We come face to face with the reptiles on our doorstep. Also, young gardening expert, George, is back to turn the Blue Peter garden into a bird haven.
35	"Purple Power - It's Your Badge!"	18 August 2016
The summer badge baton relay continues with the purple badge. Also Radzi chats to the cast of new film Swallows and Amazons, and Barney goes drone racing.
36	"Earn your Silver Badge!"	25 August 2016
It's the last leg of the summer badge baton relay and the team end it in style by celebrating the silver badge! Also, Barney attempts a tin bath race-off the Isle of Man.
37	"Badge Baton Finale!"	1 September 2016
Blue Peter celebrates the end of the summer badge baton relay with a special live performance from chart topper Izzy Bizu and the cast of the Thundermans. Also Radzi and Barney head to the race track to take on top speeds with British GT champion Jamie Chadwick.
38	"A Record-Breaking Spectacular!"	8 September 2016
Barney, Lindsey and Radzi each attempt to break their very own record, involving planes, badges and straws! Lindsey puts the new five pound super-note to the test and Barney commemorates 350 years since the Great Fire of London.
39	"A Roald Dahl Special"	15 September 2016
Celebrate Roald Dahl's 100th anniversary with a fantabulous Blue Peter special. The team try to recreate the science from his famous books. Also, the cast of Charlie and the Chocolate Factory perform in the studio. Phizz-whizzing!
40	"Sport Badge Finish Line"	22 September 2016
The team are joined in the studio by a host of Olympians to inspire viewers to earn their sport badge. We continue Lindsey's sailing journey off the Isle of Wight, Barney gets some tips from an up-and-coming young darts player and the cast of the new Disney show, The Lodge, show off their singing and dancing moves.
41	"Thrills, Spills and... Sheep!"	29 September 2016
The team test their strength against the might of the England tug of war team. Radzi starts training for his epic water ski challenge. Plus pop band, The Tide, perform their latest single.
42	"TDM Fan Club Takeover"	6 October 2016
The fans take over on this episode of Blue Peter. Everything on the show has been requested by viewers. With live music, an update on favourite Blue Peter pets, and online superstar Dan TDM vlogging especially for Blue Peter.
43	"Doodles, Deer and Dropping Beat"	13 October 2016
In this live episode of Blue Peter, champion beatboxer Bellatrix puts the gang through their paces, Lindsey learns to talk like a deer and author and illustrator Liz Pichon hosts a live doodle-a-long.
44	"Freestyling Footy Fun"	20 October 2016
This week on Blue Peter, we have the show-stopping F2 Freestylers being challenged by you with your football tricks! We reveal the winner of our Big Day Out competition, Barney hunts for magical creatures in a forest with Augmented Reality, Radzi catches up with stars from Trolls and M.O perform their new single.
45	"Tricks, Treats and Tubes"	27 October 2016
This episode of Blue Peter is a Halloween spook-tacular! We show you how to make trick-or-treat cakes and reveal how to create your very own ghost. Also, the Blue Peter garden gets ready for winter and competition winner Max receives his prize.
46	"Jeff Kinney and the Wimpy Kid!"	3 November 2016
Magician Jamie Raven wows with levitation. Superstar trials biker Danny MacAskill teaches Barney a few tricks, author Jeff Kinney talks about his new book and the team begin their epic Children in Need challenge!
47	"With Special Guest Tim Peake!"	10 November 2016
Blue Peter is out of this world with special guest, Tim Peake! We catch up with the team's efforts in the second part of the Children in Need Try-Athlon Challenge. Also, the cast of musical The Wind in the Willows perform a television exclusive.
48	"Goo Your Thing!"	17 November 2016
It's a Children in Need spectacular as Barney, Lindsey and Radzi run, row and cycle to the ultimate bake sale in their Extreme Try-athlon. Pop megastar Olly Murs performs his latest single. Plus someone will get goo-ed. Who? You decide!
49	"Big Beasts!"	24 November 2016
Radzi goes behind the scenes of Fantastic Beasts and Where to Find Them, and the team are joined in the studio by some fantastic beasts of their own.
50	"Epic Christmas Card Make!"	1 December 2016
The make viewers have been waiting for - the Blue Peter Christmas Card. Lindsey takes a road trip with viewer Henry. The 2017 Book Awards shortlist is announced. Plus a very special performance from Nathan Sykes.
51	"Hank Zipzer's In Town!"	8 December 2016
Barney and Radzi compete at the European Curling Championships, Tom Fletcher tells some Festive Fibs and Nick James (AKA Hank Zipzer) gets messy answering viewers' questions. Plus, find out who has been nominated for Young Sports Personality of the Year 2016.
52	"It's Christmas!"	15 December 2016
With Christmas just around the corner, hundreds of Blue Peter viewers will be in the studio for our traditional Christmas carol round the tree. The cast of musical Chitty Chitty Bang Bang will perform a classic hit, and we look ahead to what's coming up in 2017. Also featuring celebs, Star Wars and sprouts.
53	"Best of 2016"	29 December 2016
Barney, Lindsey and Radzi pick some of their favourite moments from a jam-packed 2016.

== 2017 ==
Presented by Lindsey Russell and Radzi Chinyanganya every Thursday

No.	Title	Original release date
1	"Flying High!"	5 January 2017
HIGHLIGHTS: Lindsey and Radzi look back on some epic Blue Peter flying challenges
2	"Blue Badge Extravaganza"	12 January 2017
LIVE: Blue Peter celebrates its new blue badge design with wrestling commentators and a special bake. Also, catch all the backstage action from Sports Personality of the Year 2016 and Gary Barlow's brand new talent show, Let it Shine!
3	"The Vamps and a Brand New Competition!"	19 January 2017
LIVE: PURPLE BADGE SHOW: Blue Peter turns purple as the team unveil the new look purple badge which is awarded for reviewing the show. Plus music from The Vamps. Jessica Ennis-Hill is in the studio to talk about a brand new competition
4	"LOLS"	26 January 2017
LIVE: The young stars of A Series of Unfortunate Events visit the studio to talk about the new series. The team celebrate the Lunar New Year with a fantastic rooster lantern that you can make at home and Barney showcases his photography and comedy skills.
5	"Feel the Burn"	2 February 2017
LIVE: The show is set alight with a magnificent fire performance and Europe's strongest man shows off his skills. The team head out to the Blue Peter garden to go bird-spotting with young gardener George and RSPB spokesperson James Harding-Morris, plus Lindsey has a go at American football.
6	"Batman and Extreme Cheese!"	2 February 2017
LIVE: On this week's Blue Peter love is in the air. Find out how to make a card with a secret message for your Valentine and enjoy a romantic performance from Gabrielle Aplin. Plus we chat to Lego Batman himself and go caving... with cheese!
TBA	TBA	7 September 2017
LIVE:
6	"Code Breaker and Bye Bye Barney!"	14 September 2017
LIVE: Barney's last show goes off with a bang! Along with the winner of the Codebreaker competition announced and Barney's last ever challenge, motorised stunt dancing, the team has a few surprises in store for Barney; from fireworks to frogs and a look back at Barney's very best bits from his 6 and a half years, it certainly was a show to remember: Notes: Final appearance of Barney Harwood, he was also awarded a Gold Blue Peter badge

4973. 27 July 2017 Big Badge Boat Bonanza!

4974. 3 August 2017 SPORTS BADGE: Sport Badge 2017 Launch!

4975. 10 August 2017 SILVER BADGE: The Robots are Coming!

4976. 17 August 2017 GREEN BADGE: Green Badge Special!

4977. 24 August 2017 PURPLE BADGE: Purple Badge Takeover!

4978. 31 August 2017 SPORTS BADGE: Summer of Sport!

4979. 7 September 2017 World Record Special!

4980. 14 September 2017 Code Breaker and Bye Bye Barney!

NOTE: Barney Harwood's last ever Blue Peter

4981. 21 September 2017 Awesome New Competition!

4982. 28 September 2017 The Descendants and Cressida Cowell!

4983. 5 October 2017 Ali-A Takeover

4984. 12 October 2017 Birthday Bonanza!

4985. 19 October 2017 Jaqueline Wilson Takeover

 Note: First guest editor

4986. 26 October 2017 Pumpkins and Parachutes

4987. 2 November 2017 Fan Club Takeover with Sophia Grace

4989. 9 November 2017 Iggy's Back!

4990. 16 November 2017 Children in Need Spectacular

4991. 23 November 2017 Worst Witch Competition

4992. 30 November 2017 Anne-Marie and the Christmas Card!

4993. 7 December 2017 Christmas is Coming!

4994. 14 December 2017 It's Chriiiiistmaaaaas!

4995. 28 December 2017 Awesome 2017!

== 2018 ==
Presented by Lindsey Russell and Radzi Chinyanganya every Thursday at 17:30. 2018 marked the shows 60th anniversary.

4996. 4 January 2018 Radzi's Free Fall!

4997. 11 January 2018 Orange Badge Special!

4998. 18 January 2018 Winners and Wipeouts!

4999. 25 January 2018 Purple Badge Takeover!

5000. 1 February 2018 5,000th Show and a Brand New Badge

NOTE: 5,000th edition and the unveil of the Diamond badge, exclusive to 2018

5001. 8 February 2018 Superstar Pancakes!

5002. 10 February 2018 Winter Sports Special

5003. 15 February 2018 Cool as Ice!

5004. 22 May 2018 Epic Science and Chris MD

5005. 1 March 2018 Book Awards 2018!

5006. 8 March 2018 Epic Rugby and a Cheesy Bake!

5007. 15 March 2018 Get Ready for a Mega Sport Relief!

5008. 22 March 2018 Sport Relief Spectacular! 5037 16 October 2018 Blue Peter Big 60th Birthday!

== 2020 ==
No.	Title	Original release date
1	"Last Year's Best Bits"	2 January 2020
The presenters look back at selected moments from 2019.
2	"Get Inspired for 2020"	9 January 2020
Richie goes inside Robocar, a robotic race car at Silverstone. Vegan chef personality Omari McQueen is in the Blue Peter studio to make banana fritters.
3	"Crackerjack Takeover and Radio 1 Challenge"	16 January 2020
Lindsey takes a test to see if she meets the standards to be a Radio 1 DJ. Sam and Mark give information about their show, Crackerjack!
4	"Blue Peter Fan Club Takeover: Gymnastics and Awesome Animals"	23 January 2020
Everything shown is decided by Purple badge recipients, including gymnastics, courtesy of the cast of recent drama My Perfect Landing, and a performance from indie pop band Blossoms.
5	"The 2020 Sport Badge Competition"	30 January 2020
A competition is launched to design the sport badge. Lindsey meets future Olympian Sky Brown.
6	"Harry Potter Cupcakes and Favourite Films"	6 February 2020
The presenters show the audience how to bake sorting hat cupcakes in honor of Harry Potter Book Night.
7	"Steve Backshall Deadly Takeover and New Hope Club"	13 February 2020
Steve Backshall joins the Blue Peter studio with a preview of series 4 of Deadly 60. New Hope Club also performs their recently-released single, Let Me Down Slow.
8	"Dr Who, Pizza Pancakes and Awesome Authors"	20 February 2020
A competition was announced in which the audience had to vote the best Blue Peter Book Award winner of the past 20 years. Richie also meets the team behind the Doctor Who sounds.
9	"Crunchy Critters and Green Machines"	27 February 2020
Richie and Blue Peter fans plant trees in the Young People's Forest in Mead. Lindsey makes bread from insects. The presenters are also joined live by Formula E ahead of the 2020 Marrakesh ePrix.
10	"World Book Day and Six the Musical"	5 March 2020
The winners of the Blue Peter Book Award are revealed, with Wildspark by Vashti Hardy winning best story, and Rise Up: Ordinary Kids with Extraordinary Stories by Amanda Li winning best book with facts. The winner of the 20th anniversary prize was revealed, with the winner being the winner from 2001, Harry Potter and the Philosopher's Stone. The cast of historical musical film Six do a performance.
11	"Sport Relief Special"	13 March 2020
Lindsey attempts a show-jumping challenge with AJ and Curtis Pritchard. Richie also attempts to perform a bungee jump.
12	"Mother's Day, Dancing and Basketball"	19 March 2020
Vale, a contemporary dance group, which participated in The Greatest Dancer, perform in the Blue Peter studio. Lindsey and Richie play against each other in a basketball challenge.
13	"Try Something New"	26 March 2020
The cast of recent drama The Snow Spider enter to talk about the show. Presenter of Officially Amazing Ben Shires attempts sled dog racing, and children's presenter Naomi Wilkinson attempts at climbing trees.

== 2021 ==
No.	Title	Original release date
1	"We LOVE Animals!"	7 January 2021
At the zoo, Lindsey and Adam encounter red pandas, Mwaksy views a rhino calf.
2	"Lindsey's Racing Challenge"	14 January 2021
This episode takes place in Spain. Lindsey sees inside, and drives a W Series racing car.
3	"Burns Night with Bake Off"	21 January 2021
Winner of the 2020 Great British Bake Off Peter Sawkins cooks traditional Burns Night food. Mwaksy goes to the Cocoa Girl offices in Hackney, the first black magazine aimed at children in the UK.
4	"Radzi Returns and Escape Room Attempt"	28 January 2021
Former presenter Radzi Chinyanganya talks about his book written three weeks prior, Move Like a Lion, and Adam puts the other three presenters in an escape room. Richie Driss takes part with a project reintroducing beavers into the UK.
5	"Sea Shanties and Lunar New Year"	4 February 2021
For Chinese New Year, Blue Peter make a rattle drum, the theme tune gets an adjustment in the theme of a sea shanty by Nathan Evans.
6	"Tracy Beaker Takeover!"	11 February 2021
Honoring the debut of My Mum Tracy Beaker on February 12, Dani Harmer and Emma Maggie Davies (Tracy and Jess Beaker) are welcomed into the Blue Peter studio, and Mwaksy goes behind the scenes of the show.
7	"Pooch Perfect and Hovercraft Racing"	18 February 2021
Pooch Perfect contestant Verity Hardcastle is welcomed into the studio with her poodle. The presenters compete with each other in a grooming challenge, with Adam and Richie also in a hovercraft race, their second head-to-head in a series of three.
8	"Gold Badge Awards"	25 February 2021
Blue Peter awards the Gold badge to two people. The recipients were Marcus Rashford and Greta Thunberg.
9	"The Blue Peter Book Awards"	4 March 2021
The 2021 Blue Peter Book Award winners are revealed, with A Kind of Spark by Elle McNicoll winning best story, and A Day In The Life Of A Poo, A Gnu And You by Mike Barfield winning best book with facts. Viewers also voted for who the presenters dressed up as (Lindsey Russell as Cheshire Cat, Adam Beales as Willy Wonka, Mwaksy Mudenda as Mary Poppins (character), Richie Driss as Paddington Bear). Actor of Tom Gates in the TV series of the same name, Logan Matthews, answers questions in the Blue Peter studio.
10	"Junior Bake Off Winner Live!"	11 March 2021
Winner of the 2021 Junior Bake Off Reece shows the audience how to make "the perfect treat" in celebration of Mother's Day.
11	"Comic Relief with Malory Towers"	19 March 2021
For a Comic Relief special, the actors of Malory Towers enter the Blue Peter studio, Tom Grennan performs, and Lindsey visits a charity where their aim is to improve mental health by gardening.
12	"Adam v Richie... The Decider!"	25 March 2021
Adam and Richie DTV shred against each other in their third challenge, with Richie Driss winning with a time of 56 seconds. Mentalist magican Chris Cox is welcomed into the studio.
13	"Green Badge Climate Heroes!"	1 April 2021
Blue Peter launches a special green campaign, which includes replacing meat with artificial meat.
14	"You're in Charge of the Show"	8 April 2021
On this episode, the viewers get to choose what is displayed.
14	"Springtime Baby Animals and Upcycle Idea"	15 April 2021
Richie attempts to work at a farm with one of Britain's youngest farmers. The audience is also shown a tutorial on how to upcycle a milk carton into a plant pot.
15	"New Competition Alert!"	22 April 2021
Jack Harries is live in studio to speak about the Our Planet Now competition in which the best story or poem would be turned into an animation by Aardman and shown at the 2021 United Nations Climate Change Conference. The submitter would receive an orange badge, a green badge, they would see their animation being produced, they would go to the conference, and their text would be in the British Library forever. The competition was judged by Harries and Cressida Cowell.
16	"Lindsey vs Mwaksy in Extreme Mountain Biking"	29 April 2021
Lindsey and Mwaksy compete against each other in a mountain bike race, with Lindsey winning one point with a time of 1 minute and 42 seconds.
17	"Ollie and Jacob Live in Studio"	6 May 2021
TikTok personalities Ollie Ball and Jacob Pasquill judge food made by the presenters with Chuck It or Scran It, with Adam winning 'The Golden Lunchbox'. Lindsey and Mwaksy compete again in archery battle, with the intent to pop six balloons with six arrows. The results were Lindsey winning with four points and Mwaksy with three points.
18	"Gaming Competition Winner Revealed!"	13 May 2021
The winner The Gaming Competition from November 2020 is revealed, the winner's first name was Naomi. In the final part of Lindsey vs Mwaksy, at the tallest high ropes course in Europe (Marston Green). There were 15 badges scattered across the course (ten blue badges worth one point and five silver badges worth two points). Mwaksy won with 18 points (10 blue, 4 silver), so the overall result was Lindsey winning with 21 points (Mwaksy had 19).
19	"David Walliams and a Eurovision Party!"	20 May 2021
The presenters go to Alton Towers to visit The World of David Walliams, and talk with David Walliams. Eurovision entrant James Newman performs his single Embers in the Blue Peter studio.
20	"Out and About in Search of Wildlife!"	27 May 2021
The presenters go to Martin Mere Wetland Centre, and Lindsey goes to the Scottish coast to rescue water-adapted birds from ongoing problems, including plastic pollution.

5173. 24 June 2021 Mwaksy and Richies Army Challenge

5174 1 July 2021 almost never takeover

5175 8 July 2021 lindsey’s ultimate challenge

5176 15 July 2021 Goodbye Lindsey after eight years, Lindsey hangs up her Blue Peter badge.

== 2025 ==
The 2025-26 Series of Blue Peter was presented by Joel Mawhinney, Abby Cook, Shini Muthukrishnan and Hacker T Dog every Friday, in an entirely pre-recorded format for the first time in the show's 67 year history.

No.	Title	Original release date
1	"New Studio, Epic World Record Battle and Racing Challenge"	5 September 2025
Joel, Abby, Shini and Henry reveal a brand new look for the Blue Peter studio, including new presenter Hacker T Dog! Gladiator Steel joins us for a world record challenge, and Joel races a supercar!
2	"Gaming Top Tips and Joel's Toughest Challenge Yet"	12 September 2025
Top online gamers Yammy and Slogo join us for gaming masterclasses on Minecraft and Roblox. Meanwhile, Joel takes on his toughest challenge yet – scaling heights and descending cliffs to try to complete the Royal Marines Mountain Leader training.
3	"Creepy or Cute with Kyle Thomas and Beard of Bees Challenge"	19 September 2025
Animal lover and social media superstar Kyle Thomas wants to prove that creepy crawlies can be cute, and Joel is challenged to wear thousands of bees on his face. Meanwhile, Shini meets one of the UK’s cutest birds, and Henry gets a bath!
4	"Strictly Special and Brand New Competition Alert!"	26 September 2025
Packed full of amazing celeb guests, epic challenges and lols galore!
5	"The Next Step Takeover and Wildlife Adventure"	3 October 2025
The stars of The Next Step take on a dance battle in the studio and surprise a class of young fans for the ultimate dance lesson on how to attempt some moves at home. Meanwhile, Abby sets off on a sea kayaking adventure to spot some incredible wildlife!
6	"Silly Challenges with Harry Hill and Can Joel Become a Butler?"	10 October 2025
Harry Hill joins us in the studio to set the presenters some silly (but hilarious) challenges! Meanwhile, Joel swaps his Blue Peter Badge for a bow tie as he trains to be a butler at one of the world’s most luxurious five-star hotels!
7	"Bro’s in Control, Pranks and What Really Happens at the Airport!"	17 October 2025
Bro's in Control stars Adam B, Callum B and Joe Tasker go head-to-head against the Blue Peter presenters in three bonkers battles... with an unexpected prank! Shini goes behind the scenes at Heathrow Airport to discover the epic jobs and secret areas you never usually get to see!
8	"Halloween Makeovers and Spooky Reads"	24 October 2025
Eleven-year-old Karis Musongole, who played young Elphaba in Wicked, flies into the studio for some Halloween fun and to show how to make creepy (but tasty!) witches’ fingers. We reveal how you can get the Elphaba look at home, and don’t miss our latest spooky Book Club read!
9	"Halloween Takeover"	31 October 2025
It's our spookiest special yet, as we're in a creepy castle for Halloween! Expect pumpkin carving with a Blue Peter twist and DIY costume ideas from online superstar Little Jem. And can Shini and Abby survive a night in a haunted house?
10	"Canadian Adventure featuring Walking with Dinosaurs Competition"	7 November 2025
11	"Sport Relief Special"	14 November 2025
Lindsey attempts a show-jumping challenge with AJ and Curtis Pritchard. Richie also attempts to perform a bungee jump.
12	"Mother's Day, Dancing and Basketball"	21 November 2025
Vale, a contemporary dance group, which participated in The Greatest Dancer, perform in the Blue Peter studio. Lindsey and Richie play against each other in a basketball challenge.
13	"Try Something New"	28 November 2025
The cast of recent drama The Snow Spider enter to talk about the show. Presenter of Officially Amazing Ben Shires attempts sled dog racing, and children's presenter Naomi Wilkinson attempts at climbing trees.
