= Ann Taylor (actress) =

- Born: 1 November 1936 (age 90); Stafford, Staffordshire, England
- Occupations: Actress; Hostess; Singer
- Known for: Blue Peter

Ann Taylor (born 1 November 1936) is an English actress, hostess, and singer who appeared on British television in the 1950s and 1960s.

== Life and career ==
Taylor attended a Hertfordshire stage school while a teenager. After stage school, she appeared in a summer show at Folkestone. She made her professional stage debut in the pantomime Sleeping Beauty at Salisbury.

Taylor was a member of the TV dancing troupe Toppers, and then moved to the West End of London for work in cabaret. She was cast as the NAAFI girl in the series The Army Game (1957-1961), which led to film and television work; including The Avengers episode "The Frighteners," in which she played Sir Thomas Weller's secretary. In 1959 she did a season of repertory at Cheltenham, and for six weeks from September to December 1959 she was a relief presenter, along with Christopher Trace, on the BBC children's program Blue Peter where she stood in for Leila Williams.

== Family ==
Taylor is the daughter of an architect. She was married to Border Television programme director John Holdsworth.
