= Blue Peter badge =

Award given by the TV programme Blue Peter

A Blue Peter badge

A Blue Peter badge is an award for Blue Peter viewers, given by the BBC children's television programme for those appearing on the show, or in recognition of achievement. They are awarded to children aged 5 to 15, or to adults who have been guests on the programme. Adults can also get a Gold badge if they have done something extraordinary. Approximately 22,000 are distributed annually.

The pin badges were introduced to the programme by editor Biddy Baxter in 1963, from an idea by Blue Peter producer Edward Barnes. The design, a shield containing the Blue Peter ship logo, was designed by Tony Hart. Coincidentally, Hart's plasticine companion, Morph, was awarded one in 1981 by Blue Peter presenter at the time Sarah Greene. Although the original white-and-blue design remains the most common and well-known, differently coloured variations have been created for various purposes. Gold badges are the highest level of award, being reserved for exceptional achievements and former presenters.

The badge provides the wearer with free entry to many British attractions, particularly museums and exhibitions that are featured on the show, although many of the attractions will only allow one badge holder for each full-price-paying adult. The programme producers suspended the privileges amid concerns about the badges being sold in March 2006, but they were reintroduced with additional security a few months later.

== Use by presenters ==
The presenters almost always wear their badges on the show – the only exception being when their apparel is incompatible (for example, a life jacket), in which case a sticker with the ship emblem is normally used instead. In addition, large prints or stickers of the ship are attached to vehicles driven by the presenters during filming assignments.

Sometimes new presenters first appear on the programme with no badge before it is clarified to the audience that they are a new presenter. For example, Zoe Salmon appeared on the show as a guest a week before being introduced as a presenter. Simon Groom first appeared during a filming assignment at a disco where he was a DJ and Gethin Jones made a debut appearance disguised as Santa Claus on Zoe Salmon's first appearance.

Many presenters are awarded the more prestigious "gold badge" when they leave the show. When Simon Thomas left in 2005, he was awarded a gold badge on his last programme. This has since become a tradition with Liz Barker, Matt Baker, Konnie Huq, Katy Hill, Joel Defries, Andy Akinwolere, Helen Skelton, Lindsey Russell, Adam Beales and Barney Harwood also being awarded gold badges on their final show. Conversely, when Richard Bacon was fired from the show for drug use, he was required to hand back his Blue Peter badge.

Several former presenters have been awarded them when appearing as guests on the programme. Valerie Singleton was awarded a gold badge during a studio interview recorded for the 1990 video release The Best of Blue Peter, the 60's and 70's. Her fellow presenters John Noakes and Peter Purves were given gold badges on the first programme in 2000 when the time capsule for the year 2000 was dug up. Peter Duncan was presented with a gold badge in February 2007, whilst appearing on the programme as a guest.

== Awards to viewers ==
Blue Peter badges are frequently given out to children who appear on the show. Additionally, viewers aged 6–15 can apply for a badge by corresponding with the show by post. Applications require a message of at least 50 words explaining why a badge is deserved and often include drawings, poems, or other creative works. There are different types of badges, representing different types of achievement.

== History of badges ==
The badge was originally introduced in 1963, featuring the blue ship logo on a white plastic shield inspired by the ship from Disney's Peter Pan. This design remained unchanged until the 1990s when a revised badge featuring a raised moulding of the ship design by Tony Hart was introduced (more detailed and neater than the previous printed reproduction). This version disappeared in 1997 when the old-style badge returned.

In 2004, coinciding with the show's September revamp, a new badge design was introduced. It is slightly larger in dimension and with a much bolder printing of the new-style traditional ship without its rigging detail (though the pre-2000 style flags remain).

In 2016, it was announced that any future Green badges awarded (see below) would be made out of recycled yoghurt pots to try to make them 'greener'. The Blue and Purple badges followed suit during early 2017. These badges are slightly smaller, thinner and lighter than the badges before this change, but have the same ship design as the 2004 badge.

== Types ==
Blue Peter currently awards several different types of badges, as well as, occasionally, some limited edition variants.

=== Main badges ===
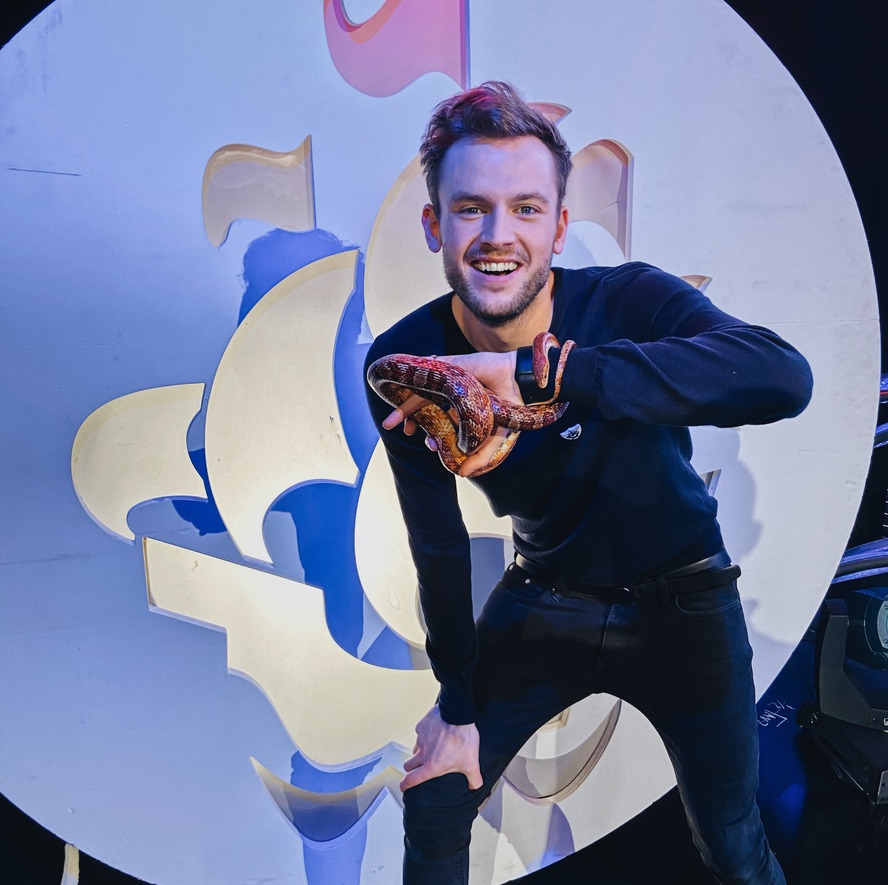
Rory Cowlam on the Blue Peter set wearing the standard blue and white badge.

- The Blue or White badge (a blue ship on a white shield): This is what the presenters on the show usually wear. Viewers of the programme can win one by either sending in an interesting letter, poem, picture or story, or by appearing on the programme.
- The Green badge (a white ship on a green shield): This is Blue Peter's environmental award, awarded for any correspondence from viewers with a conservation, nature or environmental theme. Presenters on the programme occasionally wear this badge instead of the blue one, as does the gardener Chris Collins, and they have been given out to those appearing on editions of the programme dedicated to environmental issues. On the Thursday 2 June 2016 show, it was announced that the Green badge would be made out of recycled material from then onwards.
- The Orange, or Competition Winners badge (a white ship on an orange shield): This is given to viewers who have been either a winner or runner-up in any of Blue Peter's many competitions. This replaced the original competition winners badge, which was a circular metal badge with the ship in the centre and the words "Blue Peter Competition Winner" around the outside, in 2005.
- The Sport badge was first introduced for a limited time in 2013, to try to get more children to participate in sport (from the months of July to September – a child's usual summer holiday). The badge is shield-shaped and is made from the same material as the common Blue badge. It was originally a white badge with a medal shape on the front of it (the round-shaped medal was blue, but had the white Blue Peter ship on it. The ribbon 'attached' to the medal was made from stripes of blue, white and red). A child could earn this version of the badge by introducing someone to a new sport (maybe a friend or a brother or sister). Children could initially apply for the Sport badge during the summer months of every year since 2013, with slight changes in the badge's design each year. The 2014 and 2015 badge had borders added to the design, which were blue and red respectively. To celebrate the 2016 Summer Olympics in Rio de Janeiro, a competition was launched to design the 2016 Sport badge. The Sport badge was also awarded in 2017, 2018, 2019 and 2020. The 2021/22 Sport badge was designed by skateboarder Sky Brown; it featured a wave design, and the raised motto, "The Sky is the Limit," in a ring around the ship logo. The current version of the Sport badge (launched on 14 July 2023) was designed by England footballer Leah Williamson. This badge is now available all year round, and is awarded to children for trying a new sport or for showing progress in a particular sport or physical activity.
- The Music badge, designed by Ed Sheeran, was launched for BBC Music Day in 2019; it has a black ship on a multi-coloured shield featuring musical instruments and other motifs.
- The Book badge was introduced in 2023. It is awarded to children for showing an interest in reading. It was designed by Quentin Blake in his caricature style.
- The Gold badge (a gold-plated brooch in the shape of the ship logo): This is Blue Peter's highest award and is given for exceptional achievement, such as to people who have performed acts of extreme bravery, or represented their country in a major event. It takes the form of a gold-plated ship-shaped pin brooch. Gold badge holders include Leo Stuchbury (1993) who was awarded this badge for being the youngest ever person to complete the National Swimathon at the age of 6, David Beckham, J. K. Rowling, Stephen Payne, Queen Elizabeth II (2001), Tom Daley (2009), David Tennant (2009), Lewis Hamilton (2009), Karina Bailey McNally (2009), Dani Harmer (2009), Gary Barlow (2009), Anthony Horowitz (2011), Jony Ive (2013), Helen Glover (2014), Peter Lord (2015), Steven Spielberg (2016), Roald Dahl (posthumously 2016), the Duke and Duchess of Cambridge (2017), Ed Sheeran (2018), Madonna, Peter Jackson, David Attenborough, Paul McCartney (2019), Captain Tom Moore (2020), Anne Wood (2020), Marcus Rashford (2021), King Charles III and Queen Camilla (2023), and Harry Styles (2026). Also, Matthew McGuinness for outstanding cricket despite living with cystic fibrosis in 2006, E Henshaw for fundraising efforts in 2013 and Emily Burrows for bravery and fundraising in 2019. Two dogs have also received the Gold badge: Bonnie in 1991 and Endal in 2003. Valerie Singleton was the first former presenter to be awarded the gold badge, being presented with it by Yvette Fielding and John Leslie during the recording of a commercial VHS home video The Best of Blue Peter, the 60's and 70's, released in 1990. John Noakes and Peter Purves were awarded their gold badges during the programme broadcast in January 2000 where the presenters reunited to open the box buried for the millennium in 1971. It has become traditional to present a leaving presenter with a gold badge on their final show, firstly with Simon Thomas, (see Use by presenters, above). Former editors of the programme; Biddy Baxter and Lewis Bronze were both given the badge live on their last shows, whilst Richard Marson was awarded one after his last programme by Baxter. Janet Ellis was awarded her gold badge in November 2017 on BBC’s breakfast news by presenter Radzi Chingyanganya. BBC Executive Producer Andy Wilman was privately awarded a badge for his work on Top Gear, as well as giving advice to Blue Peter executives.

=== Limited edition badges ===
As well as the badges listed above, some types of badges have been produced as limited editions for various occasions:

- A 25th birthday badge, introduced in October 1983.
- A 30th birthday badge, introduced in October 1988.
- A 35th birthday badge, introduced in October 1993.
- A badge to celebrate the 40th anniversary of the launch of the original badge in 1963, introduced in October 2003. This moulding was made of rubber and larger than the traditional badge; it consisted of a white shield with a raised 'bubble ship' applique.
- A 50th birthday badge, introduced in October 2008. This was a gold shield with a blue ship, with the digits "50" superimposed. It was awarded to viewers who sent in something to the programme which celebrated the 50th birthday. However this badge was not announced on the programme itself.
- The Factbyte Factory badge (a shield containing a hologram which oscillates between the Blue Peter logo and a "factbyte" logo) was introduced in early 2009. This badge was awarded to those achieving VIP Level 7 in the online Factbyte Factory game. This was achieved by collecting factbytes (interesting facts and information represented by a gold circle containing an f) from the programmes and the website. This was a limited-edition badge and the promotion ended after the close of the 2009 series.
- The Diamond badge, given out in 2018 to celebrate the 60th anniversary of Blue Peter and given to viewers who had already received a blue badge.
- The Doctor Who badge, given out in 2023 to celebrate the 60th anniversary of Doctor Who, was given to the top 500 competition entries for the Blue Peter Doctor Who Competition.
- The Silver and Blue badge (a silver ship on a blue shield; not to be confused with the Silver badge described below) was awarded to viewers who had already won a Blue badge, for a further achievement, until it was retired in 2022 in favour of a new Silver badge.
- The Silver badge (a silver ship on a sparkling silver shield) was launched on 14 October 2022, and was awarded for acts of kindness and supporting others. This badge was retired on 10 February 2025.
- The Purple, Fan Club or Team Player's badge (a white ship on a purple shield): Introduced in September 2006, this was originally awarded to twelve children a month who won the chance to spend a day working with the Blue Peter team by having ideas for the programme. It was also awarded to the 'Purple Lady' visited by Gethin Jones on the show broadcast on Thursday 10 May 2007. From the September 2007 series, the 'team players' scheme was changed and viewers were then awarded these badges when writing a review of an edition of the programme. Applications for the Purple badge closed on 31 March 2025.

=== Other awards ===
As well as the badges, an "Outstanding Endeavour" award was introduced to the show in 1978. It is circular, made from brass, and bears the show's ship logo. It was presented to the programme on its 20th-anniversary show by original presenter Christopher Trace. Trace was working at a factory at the time and his colleagues made the award to be presented to a viewer who had achieved some remarkable endeavour, such as saving a life or overcoming a particular adversity. Trace had not informed the production team ahead of the live broadcast he was planning on introducing the award on the programme. Initially it was presented annually on the show's October birthday edition, being given to, amongst others, pop group Musical Youth in 1982 and trampoline champion Andrea Holmes in 1983, who received the award from Trace himself on the 25th-anniversary show. 11-years-old lifesaver Martin Pout won the award in 1984 followed by Bob Geldof in 1985. Don Allum took the award in 1987 and teenagers Simon Marsh and Anthony Walters were recognised in 1988 for saving a school bus from disaster, being given their award by Valerie Singleton on the show's 30th anniversary edition. In 1989 the show honoured the boys of Emanuel School who had assisted the victims of the Clapham Junction rail crash on 12 December 1988. This was the last time the award was presented.

== Badges for sale ==
In March 2006, the news that Blue Peter badges were available for sale on auction websites such as eBay attracted a great deal of media interest, with the suspicion that the right to free entry was being abused. In a leader article The Times described the news as "a knife to the national psyche", while The Sun launched a campaign in which readers could "send in the names of people they know who have an illegal Blue Peter badge".

After news of the sales reached a wide audience, the number of badges for sale on eBay exploded from a few dozen to 300. eBay said that it would remove any auctions proven to involve fake badges on the grounds of copyright infringement, but that trade in real badges was not illegal and would not be halted by eBay administrators.

On 29 March 2006, the decision was made to withdraw the privileges the badges offered until measures could be put in place to stop the badges being sold for commercial gain, with the show appealing to the public for ideas. Accompanying the statement of suspensions the show's editor Richard Marson said Blue Peter wished to "protect children who have earned their badges and who are feeling very let down by this cynical trade."

Blue Peter badges were re-introduced on 19 June 2006, under a new system in which all current holders of a Blue Peter badge and those who win a badge will also need to be issued with a photo ID card. The idea was thought up by 11-year-old Blue Peter viewer and Blue badge winner Helen Jennings, who even included a prototype design of the ID card in the letter that she sent to the show. The producers awarded Jennings a Silver badge for proposing the system. ID cards for previous badge winners aged 6 to 15 can be obtained by entering details into a form on the Blue Peter website.
