= Abby Cook =

Abby Cook may refer to:

- Abby Cook (ice hockey) (born 1998), Canadian ice hockey player
- Abby Cook (television presenter) (born 2002), Scottish television presenter
