= Blue Peter =

British children's TV series (since 1958)

- Genre: Entertainment
- Created by: John Hunter Blair
- Presented by: Abby Cook; Shini Muthukrishnan; Hacker T Dog; Leo Olsson; (See full list)
- Country of origin: United Kingdom
- Original language: English
- No. of episodes: 5,294 (list of episodes)

Production
- Production locations: BBC Lime Grove Studios (1958–1960); BBC Television Centre (1960–2011); dock10 studios (2011–2025); Campfield Studios (2025–present)
- Running time: 15 minutes (1958–1960s); 25 minutes (1960s–2008); 35 minutes (2005–2006; CBBC Channel Extension); 24 minutes (2008–2011); 28 minutes (2012–present); 60 minutes (birthday specials and documentaries)
- Production companies: BBC Children's Productions (2018–2022); BBC Studios Kids & Family (2022–present)

Original release
- Network: BBC1 (1958–2012); BBC2 (1980–present); CBBC (2012–present)
- Release: 16 October 1958 – present

Related
- Record Breakers

Blue Peter is a British children's television entertainment programme created by John Hunter Blair. It is the longest-running children's TV show in the world, having been broadcast since October 1958. It was broadcast primarily from BBC Television Centre in London until September 2011, when the programme moved to dock10 studios at MediaCityUK in Salford, Greater Manchester. The show is currently broadcast from Campfield Studios in Manchester as of September 2025.

It is currently aired on the CBBC television channel on Fridays at 5 p.m. The show is also repeated on Saturday mornings on BBC Two, Sundays at 9:00 a.m. and a BSL version is shown on Tuesdays at 2:00 p.m. For decades the show was regularly broadcast live; however, in March 2025, a fully pre-recorded format was introduced.

Following its original creation, the programme was developed by a BBC team led by Biddy Baxter; she became the programme editor in 1965, relinquishing the role in 1988. Throughout the show's history there have been forty-four presenters; currently, it is hosted by Abby Cook, Shini Muthukrishnan, Leo Olsson and the puppet Hacker T Dog.

The show uses a nautical title and theme. Its content, which follows a magazine/entertainment format, features viewer and presenter challenges, competitions, celebrity interviews, popular culture, and sections on making arts and crafts items from household items. The show has had a garden in both London and Salford, known as the Blue Peter Garden, which is used during the summer and for outdoor activities. The programme has featured a number of pets including dogs, tortoises, cats and parrots. The longevity of Blue Peter has established it as a significant part of British culture and heritage.

== Content ==
Blue Peter's content is wide-ranging. Most programmes are broadcast live, but usually include at least one filmed report. There will also often be a demonstration of an activity in the studio, or a music or dance performance. Between the 1960s and 2011 the programme was made at BBC Television Centre, and often came from Studio 1, the fourth-largest TV studio in Britain and one of the largest in Europe. This enabled Blue Peter to include large-scale demonstrations and performances within the live programme. From the September 2007 series, the programme was broadcast from a small fixed set in Studio 2. However, from 2009 the series began to use the larger studios once more; also more programmes were broadcast in their entirety from the Blue Peter Garden.

The show is also famous for its "makes", which are demonstrations of how to construct a useful object or prepare food. These have given rise to the oft-used phrase "Here's one I made earlier", as presenters bring out a perfect and completed version of the object they are making – a phrase credited to Christopher Trace, though Marguerite Patten is another possibility. Trace also used the line "And now for something completely different", which was later taken up by Monty Python. Time is also often given over to reading letters and showing pictures sent in by viewers.

Over 5,000 editions have been produced since 1958, and almost every episode from 1964 onwards still exists in the BBC archives. This is unusual for programmes of that era; editor Biddy Baxter personally ensured that telerecordings and, from 1970, video recording were kept of each episode. The earliest surviving footage, a 35mm film sequence, comes from Programme 204 produced and broadcast in 1962. The earliest edition to survive in a complete form is Programme 238 from 1963, which survives as a 16mm film recording.

Many items from Blue Peter's history have become embedded in British popular culture, especially moments when things have gone wrong, such as the much-repeated clip of Lulu the baby elephant (from a 1969 edition) who urinated and defecated on the studio floor, appeared to tread on the foot of presenter John Noakes and then proceeded to attempt an exit, dragging her keeper along behind her.

Other well-remembered and much-repeated items from this era include a Girl Guides' campfire that got out of hand on the 1970 Christmas edition, and John Noakes's report on the cleaning of Nelson's Column.

== History ==
"Blue Peter" maritime signal flag

=== Early years ===
Blue Peter was first aired on 16 October 1958. It had been commissioned to producer John Hunter Blair by Owen Reed, the head of children's programmes at the BBC, as there were no programmes for children aged between five and eight. Reed got his inspiration after watching Children's Television Club, the brainchild of former radio producer, Trevor Hill, who created the latter show as a successor to his programme Out of School, broadcast on BBC Radio's Children's Hour; Hill networked the programme from BBC Manchester and launched it aboard the MV Royal Iris ferry on the River Mersey, Liverpool with presenter Judith Chalmers welcoming everyone aboard at the bottom of the gangplank.

It was subsequently televised about once a month. Hill relates how Reed came to stay with him and his wife, Margaret Potter, in Cheshire, and was so taken with the "Blue Peter" flag on the side of the ship and the programme in general, that he asked to rename it and take it to London to be broadcast on a weekly basis (see Reed's obituary). The "Blue Peter" is used as a maritime signal, indicating that the vessel flying it is about to leave, and Reed chose the name to represent "a voyage of adventure" on which the programme would set out. Hunter Blair also pointed out that blue was a popular colour with children, and Peter was a common name of a typical child's friend.

The first two presenters were Christopher Trace, an actor, and Leila Williams, winner of Miss Great Britain in 1957. The two presenters were responsible for activities which matched the traditional gender roles. As broadcasting historian Asa Briggs expressed it in 1995: "Leila played with dolls; Chris played with trains". They were supported on occasion by Tony Hart, an artist who later designed the ship logo, who told stories about an elephant called Packi (or Packie). It was broadcast every Thursday for fifteen minutes (17:00–17:15) on BBC TV (which later became BBC One). Over the first few months more features were added, including competitions, documentaries, cartoons, and stories. Early programmes were almost entirely studio-based, with very few filmed inserts being made.

=== 1960–1969 ===
From Monday 10 October 1960, Blue Peter was switched to every Monday and extended from 15 minutes to 20 minutes (17.00–17.20). In 1961, Hunter Blair became ill, and was often absent. After he produced his last edition on 12 June 1961, a series of temporary producers took up the post. Hunter Blair was replaced the following September by Clive Parkhurst who did not get along with Leila Williams. "He could not find anything for me to do," Williams recalled. In October, she did not appear for six editions, and was eventually fired, leaving Christopher Trace on his own or with one-off presenters. Parkhurst was replaced by John Furness, and Anita West joined Trace on 7 May 1962. She featured in just 16 editions, making her the shortest-serving presenter, and was replaced by Valerie Singleton, who presented regularly until 1972, and on special assignments until 1981. Following the departure of Furness, a new producer who was committed to Blue Peter was required, so Biddy Baxter was appointed. At the time she was contracted to schools' programmes on the radio, and therefore unable to take up her new post immediately.

It was suggested that Edward Barnes, a production assistant, would temporarily produce the show until Baxter arrived, at which point he would become her assistant. This suggestion was turned down, and Leonard Chase was appointed, with Barnes as his assistant. Baxter eventually joined Blue Peter at the end of October 1962.

During this period, many iconic features of Blue Peter were introduced. The first appeal took place in December 1962, replacing the practice of reviewing toys that children would ask for themselves. Blue Peter's first pet, a brown and white mongrel dog named Petra, was introduced on 17 December 1962. The puppy soon died of distemper, and having decided against upsetting young viewers over the news, Barnes and Baxter had to search London pet shops for a convincing clandestine replacement. Features such as "makes" (normally involving creating something such as an advent crown, out of household junk) and cooking became regular instalments on Blue Peter and continue to be used today. The Blue Peter badge was introduced in 1963, along with the programme's new logo designed by Tony Hart. Baxter introduced a system that ensured replies sent to viewers' letters were personal; as a girl, she had written to Enid Blyton and twice received a standard reply, which had upset her.

The next year, from 28 September 1964, Blue Peter began to be broadcast twice weekly, with Baxter becoming the editor in 1965, and Barnes and Rosemary Gill (an assistant producer who had joined as a temporary producer while Baxter was doing jury service) becoming the programme's producers. The first Blue Peter book, an annual in all but name, was published that year, and one was produced nearly every year after that, until 2010. A third presenter, John Noakes, was introduced at the end of 1965 and became the longest-serving presenter. A complete contrast to Trace, Noakes set the scene for "daredevil" presenters that has continued through the generations of presenters. Trace left Blue Peter in July 1967, and was replaced by Peter Purves in November. The trio of Valerie Singleton, John Noakes and Peter Purves lasted five years, and according to Richard Marson were 'the most famous presenting team in the show's history'. In 1965, the first Summer Expedition (a filming trip abroad) was held in Norway, and continued every year (except 1986 and 2011) until 2012, all over the world.

=== 1970–1999 ===
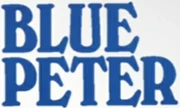
First logo from 1979 to 1985.

The first colour edition of Blue Peter aired on 14 September 1970, and the last black and white edition on 24 June 1974. Despite some editions being in black and white during this period, most editions did use colour film inserts. A regular feature of the 1970s were the Special Assignments, which were essentially reports on interesting topics, filmed on location. Singleton took this role, and in effect became the programme's "roving reporter". Blue Peter also offered breaking news on occasion, such as the 1971 eruption of Mount Etna. In May 1976, presenter Lesley Judd interviewed Otto Frank, father of Anne Frank, after he had agreed to bring his daughter's diaries to Britain. From 1971 the summer expedition from the previous year was edited into special programmes broadcast under the title Blue Peter Flies The World, televised during the summer break when the team were recording the latest expedition. The first was shown in July 1971 and featured the expedition to Jamaica.

In 1974, the Blue Peter Garden was officially opened in a green space outside the Television Centre restaurant block. By this time, Blue Peter had become an established children's programme, with regular features which have since become traditions. In 1978, the show celebrated its twentieth anniversary with a nationwide balloon launch from five regional cities during a special edition of the programme when Christopher Trace, Leila Williams, Valerie Singleton and Peter Purves returned. John Noakes contributed a message pre-recorded on film. At this time, Trace introduced the Blue Peter Outstanding Endeavour Award.

In 1979, its theme music was updated by Mike Oldfield, and at the end of the decade a new presenting team was brought in, consisting of Simon Groom, Tina Heath and Christopher Wenner. They were overshadowed by the success of the previous two decades, and failed to make as much of an impact. Heath decided to leave after a year when she discovered she was pregnant, but agreed to have a live scan of her baby, something which had never been done on television before. Blue Peter was praised for this by the National Childbirth Trust who told the BBC that in 'five minutes, Blue Peter had done more to educate children about birth than they'd achieved in ten years of sending out leaflets'. The production team decided not to renew Wenner's contract, resulting in him leaving along with Heath on 23 June 1980. Sarah Greene and Peter Duncan both joined in 1980, and a new producer, Lewis Bronze, joined in 1982. Janet Ellis joined Simon Groom, Sarah Greene and Peter Duncan on 28 April 1983, replacing Greene at the end of that season. The 1980s saw the Blue Peter studio become more colourful and bright, with the presenters gradually wearing more fashionable outfits, in contrast with previous decades. Several videos of Blue Peter were made available from 1982, the first being Blue Peter Makes, and an omnibus comprising the two weekly editions appeared in 1986 on Sunday mornings. Ahead of the show's 25th anniversary in October 1983, BBC1 ran a series Blue Peter Goes Silver, revisiting previous summer expeditions. The 25th anniversary itself was commemorated by a documentary presented by Valerie Singleton shown on BBC1 on Sunday 16 October 1983. This was followed the next day by a special edition of the programme when Christopher Trace presented the annual Outstanding Endeavour Award and Valerie Singleton, Peter Purves, Christopher Wenner, Tina Heath and Sarah Greene returned to celebrate the show's birthday with the current presenting trio of Simon Groom, Peter Duncan and Janet Ellis who launched a national balloon treasure hunt.

On 27 June 1988, Baxter took part in her final show, after nearly 26 years of involvement, and Bronze took her place as editor. Around this time, Blue Peter became distinctively environmentally aware, and introduced a green badge in November 1988 for achievements related to the environment. Shortly before, in October 1988, the show celebrated its thirtieth anniversary with a competition to design the cover of a commemorative issue of the Radio Times and Valerie Singleton presented the Outstanding Endeavour Award on the birthday show itself. The following year, the award was presented for the last time.

In 1989 (and again in 1992 and 1994), new arrangements of the theme tune were introduced. In 1995, BBC1 controller Alan Yentob suggested airing a third edition of Blue Peter each week. This meant that it was sometimes pre-recorded; Joe Godwin, the director, suggested that the Friday edition should be a lighter version of the show, which would concentrate on music, celebrities and games. Helen Lederer presented a documentary on BBC2 to celebrate the show's 35th anniversary Here's One I Made Earlier, with a special edition of the regular programme featuring the returns of Leila Williams, John Noakes and Lesley Judd amongst many other presenters. Neither Noakes or Judd had appeared in the studio since leaving the programme and Williams was returning for the first time in 15 years. A fourth presenter, Katy Hill, was introduced in 1995, but unlike earlier decades, there was little stability in the line-up, with resignations and new additions made almost every year of the decade. The 1990s also saw many more live broadcasts on location, with many shot entirely away from the studio. Blue Peter was also one of the first television series to launch a website. Oliver Macfarlane replaced Bronze as editor in 1996.

In October 1998, Richard Bacon was dismissed, following reports in the News of the World that he had taken cocaine. This incident followed shortly after the show's 40th anniversary, when many previous presenters returned for a special programme. Steve Hocking then replaced Macfarlane as editor, at what was regarded as a difficult period for the programme. He introduced a further re-arrangement of the theme tune and a new graphics package in September 1999.

=== 2000–2010 ===
The 2000s began with the opening of two previously buried time capsules. Former presenters including Singleton, Purves and Noakes were invited back to assist, and the programme also looked at life in the 1970s when the first capsule was buried. With Hill's departure and replacement by Liz Barker in 2000, the new team of herself, Konnie Huq, Simon Thomas, and Matt Baker were consistent for the next few years. The Friday edition, as in the previous decade, featured games, competitions and celebrities, but additionally there was a drama series, The Quest, which featured cameos of many former presenters.

It was at this time that the new Head of the BBC Children's Department, Nigel Pickard, asked for Blue Peter to be broadcast all year round. This was achieved by having two editions per week instead of three during the summer months, and using pre-recorded material. The early 2000s also introduced Christmas productions, in which the presenters took part. In 2003, Richard Marson became the new editor, and his first tasks included changing the output of Blue Peter on the digital CBBC. The first year of the channel's launch consisted of repeated editions, plus spin-off series Blue Peter Unleashed and Blue Peter Flies the World. This new arrangement involved a complex schedule of live programmes and pre-recorded material, being broadcast on BBC One and CBBC. Marson also introduced a brand new set, graphics and music. In September 2007, a new editor, Tim Levell, took over. At the same time, budget cuts meant that the programme came from a smaller studio. In February 2008 the BBC One programme was moved from 5pm to 4:35pm to accommodate The Weakest Link, and as a result, Blue Peter's ratings initially dropped to as low as 100,000 viewers in the age 6–12 bracket, before steadily improving.

As with the previous decade, numerous presenters joined and left the programme. This included the exits of Thomas, Baker and Barker and the additions of Zöe Salmon, Gethin Jones and Andy Akinwolere. Early 2008 saw the departure of Huq, who had become the longest serving female presenter with over ten years on the show. Later that year, Salmon and Jones both left and the presenting team of Akinwolere with new additions Helen Skelton and Joel Defries was introduced.

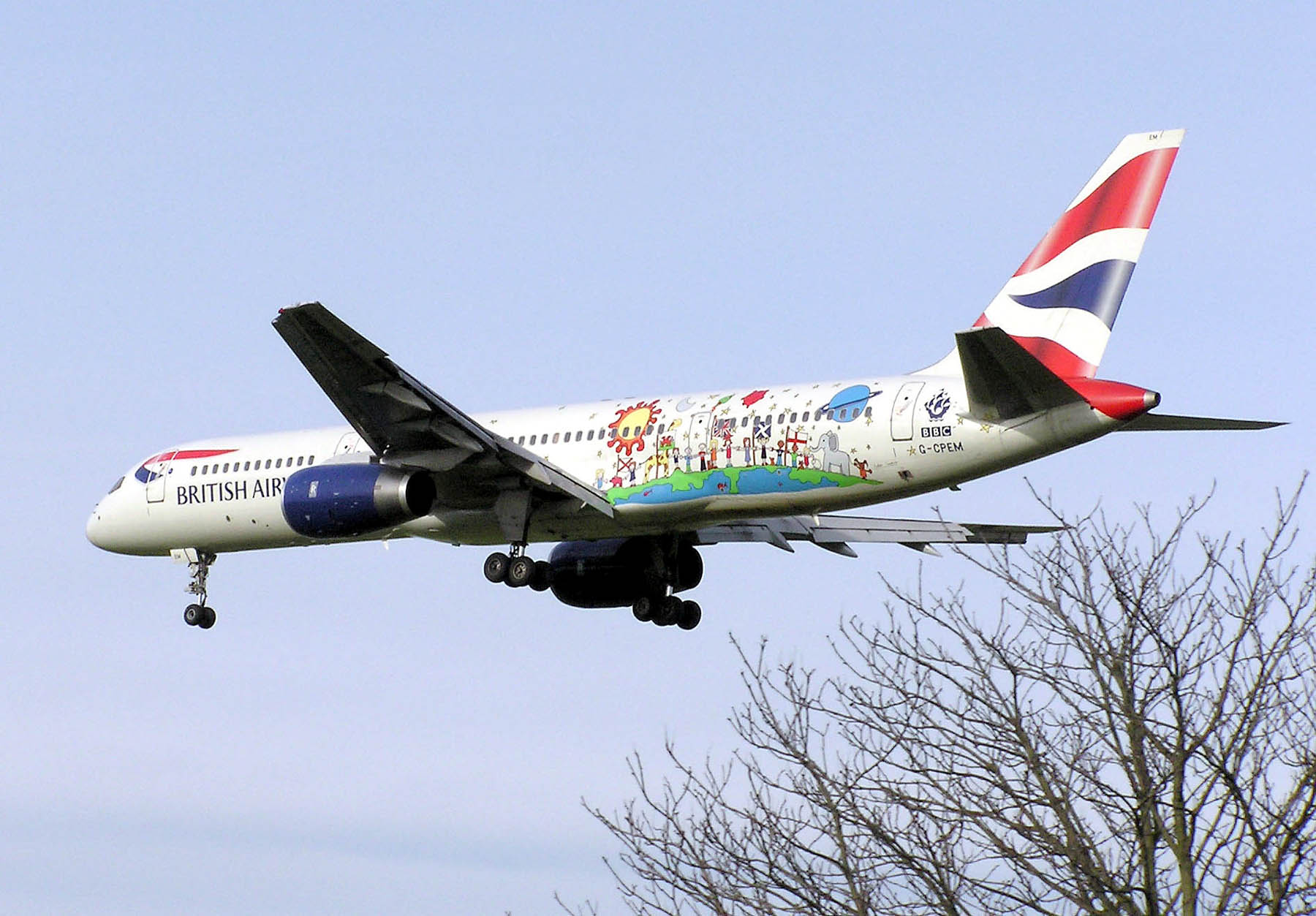
The specially painted Blue Peter British Airways Boeing 757 landing at London Heathrow Airport

On 16 October 2008, Blue Peter celebrated its 50th anniversary with a reception at Buckingham Palace hosted by Queen Elizabeth II and featuring several former presenters. There was a special live edition of the show broadcast to celebrate the anniversary with many returning presenters and a 60-minute documentary on BBC1 featuring interviews with many previous presenters and production staff, including Edward Barnes, Biddy Baxter and Rosemary Gill.

Writing in the BBC's in-house magazine, Ariel, in 2009, BBC Children's Controller Richard Deverell announced plans to re-invent the show to be more like the BBC's motoring programme Top Gear. Deverell hopes that by adding "danger and excitement", Blue Peter will achieve the same "playground buzz" among children as Top Gear.

=== 2011–2017 ===
In January 2011, Barney Harwood was introduced to the programme as replacement for Defries, who had departed in late 2010 after two years. Unusually, Harwood was no stranger to Blue Peter viewers, having appeared as a presenter on CBBC for many years, on shows including Prank Patrol and Bear Behaving Badly.

On 29 March 2011, Blue Peter became the first programme in the UK to broadcast an entire show in 360 degrees on the web. Viewers were able to watch the programme via their TVs and simultaneously interact with the television studio in front of and behind the cameras on the website. Viewers were also challenged to play a game where they had to find particular crew members and staff dressed up in distinctive costumes.

The final edition of Blue Peter to broadcast from the BBC's Television Centre in London was broadcast on 28 June 2011, before a move to Dock10 studios, MediaCityUK. The set left behind at BBC Television Centre was subsequently purchased and installed at Sunderland University's David Puttnam Media Centre in August 2013.

When the new series started on 26 September 2011, after the usual summer break, Harwood and Skelton revealed the new look Blue Peter studio along with the new music and title sequence. Departed presenter Andy Akinwolere was not initially replaced, and for the first time in 50 years only two presenters remained on the programme. The new Blue Peter Garden, located outside the studios, was officially opened by Princess Anne in February 2012.

In 2013, Lindsey Russell was voted the 36th presenter via Blue Peter - You Decide!, a series of five programmes hosted by Dick and Dom, where ten aspiring presenters were set a number of challenges to prove that they were worthy of the position. Judges Cel Spellman, Eamonn Holmes and Myleene Klass decided the final three, before viewers were given the chance to vote online. Russell joined Blue Peter in September of that year, shortly before Skelton's departure and the introduction of her replacement Radzi Chinyanganya.

In the summer, Blue Peter often challenges its viewers to earn all of their Blue Peter badges (with the exception of orange and gold) through five weeks, where the team look at each individual badge for a week, finishing with the limited time Sports badge which appears every summer with a different design. In the show before these weeks, the team show viewers how to make something to keep their badges in/on and continue the theme through the weeks, these have included the Badge Baton Relay in 2016, where badges stored within a baton tube and the Big Badge Boat Bonanza in 2017, where badges displayed on the iconic BP ship, a 2D model that can be made from paper.

Ahead of their Jubilee celebrations, Blue Peter introduced its first ever Guest Editor to the show on 19 October 2017 which was children's author Dame Jacqueline Wilson. Guest Editors have control for the day and plan what they want to show on their edition, as well as taking control behind the scenes.

=== 2018–2021 ===
A special programme broadcast on 1 February 2018, marked Blue Peter's 5000th edition. A brand new Diamond badge was revealed for the first time, designed by Henry Holland. This was only to be awarded within the special 60th year of 2018.

On 12 October 2017, it was revealed that outside of MediaCityUK, a Hollywood style walk of fame would be created with the names of famous people who have received a Gold Blue Peter badge. The walkway would lead up to the front of the studios and would help to mark 60 years of Blue Peter.

There were various celebrations across the UK for "The Big Birthday Year". In January, a competition was launched to design Blue Peter's second birthday balloon to be flown. In May, the Millennium Time Capsule formally buried under the Millennium Dome, which was dug up accidentally in 2017 by builders went on tour with various past presenters around the country. A play, "Once Seen On Blue Peter", ran at the Edinburgh Festival fringe in August, with six former presenters appearing in it.

On 16 October 2018, a special one-hour live edition of the programme, entitled Blue Peter: Big 60th Birthday, was broadcast on CBBC. Guests included The Vamps, Sophie Ellis-Bextor and Ed Sheeran, who was presented with a gold Blue Peter badge. Many former presenters returned for the show and contributed to the broadcast. Matt Baker contributed a pre-recorded message and Mark Curry was represented by a Lego model as he had to cancel his contribution due to ill health. The programme was repeated on BBC Two on 20 October.

The 60th Birthday celebrations were also marked by other BBC programming, including The One Show hosted by Matt Baker and former Blue Peter contributor Gabby Logan, which featured Sarah Greene, Mark Curry, Simon Thomas and Konnie Huq; ITV's Lorraine, where Greene appeared with Leila Williams and Anthea Turner; and BBC Breakfast which featured Lesley Judd. A documentary entitled Happy Birthday Blue Peter was broadcast that evening on BBC Radio 2. It was hosted by Barney Harwood and featured interviews with past and present presenters, as well as members of the production team.

=== 2021–present ===
On 17 June 2022, Adam Beales announced that he would be leaving the show, in July 2022, after 2 years. His final show aired on 15 July 2022. He announced on YouTube that he was gay the next week on 22 July 2022. On 22 October 2022, former presenter Helen Skelton danced a Charleston with professional partner Gorka Marquez on Strictly Come Dancing to the Blue Peter theme tune as a part of the celebrations of BBC's 100th Anniversary. On 25 October 2022, Joel Mawhinney was announced as the latest presenter. Mawhinney is a Northern Irish magician and content creator from Bangor, County Down who first appeared as a guest in summer 2018. He is known for his illusions on social media where he has a large following. He also starred in his own BBC Northern Ireland TV series Life is Magic in 2020. Mawhinney became the 41st Blue Peter presenter.

On 3 February 2023, Richie Driss announced that after 4 years he would leave the show. His last show aired on 3 March. On 6 March 2023 a new presenter (the show's 42nd) was announced; Abby Cook. Her first show was aired four days later on 10 March. Cook is a wheelchair user from Falkirk who has worked with Forth Valley Disability Sport and as a mental health project administrator for Scottish Disability Sport. She also trains twice a week with Paralympians as part of the Forth Valley Flyers. On 15 January 2024, the BBC announced that Shini Muthukrishnan would become the 43rd presenter and would make her debut later that week. Muthukrishnan is a content creator from Stafford. A graduate from King's College London, she taught children in Hong Kong during her gap year and volunteered at a youth camp in Birmingham.

On 24 January 2024, the BBC announced that the series' tender rights would be put up for auction as part of the corporation's "Competitive Tender" policy, allowing third-parties to bid on producing the programme. On 28 October, it was announced that BBC Studios Kids & Family had retained the rights to produce the programme on a two-year tender.

It was reported on 22 March 2025 that, after over 66 years, Blue Peter would no longer air any live episodes and would now transition to a fully pre-recorded format. Going forward, episodes will be made available on BBC iPlayer first before being shown on CBBC later in the day. This was confirmed by the BBC two days later; a spokesperson for the BBC said the change was to accommodate new viewing habits and to "future-proof the show and sustain its legacy for years to come". In May 2025, it was announced that the show's format and set design would be refreshed in September when the series relocates to a new studio in Manchester city centre; however, the production team, post-production and Blue Peter Garden will remain at Media City in Salford. On 17 July, it was further announced that familiar CBBC face Hacker T Dog would join the presenting team as part of the relaunch, becoming the show's forty-fourth presenter in all. He had made guest appearances on the show before this.

== Presenters and contributors ==
Christopher Trace and Leila Williams were the first presenters of Blue Peter in October 1958, and since then, there have been 44 subsequent presenters. Abby Cook, who joined as the show's 42nd presenter in March 2023, currently presents the programme alongside Shini Muthukrishnan, who joined in January 2024 as the 43rd and Hacker T. Dog, who joined in September 2025 and most recent presenter of the long-running show.

Director/producer Alex Leger who joined the show in 1975 as a production assistant and retired in 2011, making him Blue Peter's longest serving staff member ever. Presenter Anthea Turner said of Leger: "Alex was the director we feared and loved in the same sentence; he would push you to your limits of endurance and in my case made me face my fear of water by taking me to Crystal Palace to shoot a film about high board diving. Never have my knees knocked so much." Writing on The Huffington Post in November 2012, Leger admitted the "piles of clippings, strange souvenirs from overseas trips, half-finished 'makes' from the show and half-dead pot plants disguised the fact something ground-breaking was happening in the cramped Blue Peter offices". Leger published his book, Blue Peter: Behind the Badge, on 5 November 2012, in collaboration with many of his former colleagues.

Adam Beales was named as the 40th presenter and joined the team in September 2020. He left the show on 15 July 2022.

The most recent presenter to depart was Joel Mawhinney; after three-and-a-half years, he left on 3 July 2026.

On 10 October 2026, the BBC announced that Leo Olsson will join the show on 20 November 2026 as the show's 45th presenter.

== Blue Peter Garden ==
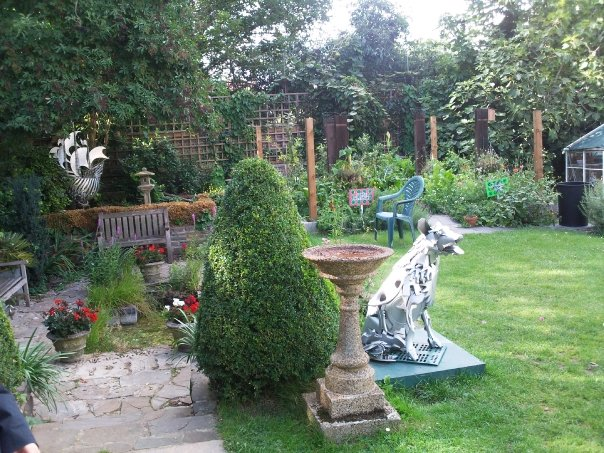
The former Blue Peter garden at BBC Television Centre in 2009

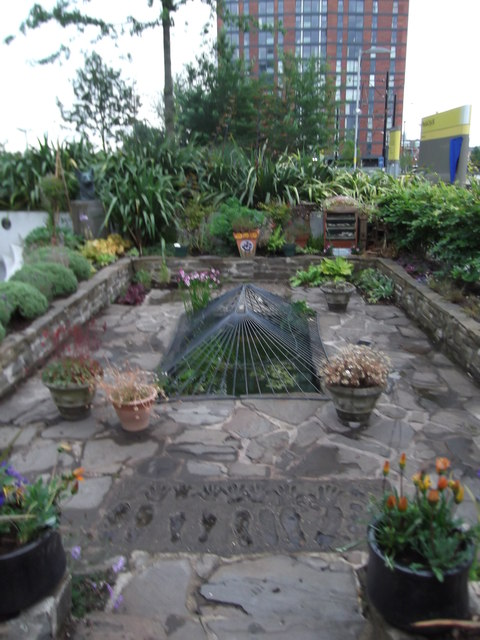
Current Blue Peter garden at Media City in Salford (2014)

Since the 1970s, presenters have maintained a Blue Peter Garden. The first garden, which was designed by British horticulturist Percy Thrower in 1974, was at the rear of Television Centre (51°30′38.25″N 0°13′39.61″W). Its features included an Italian sunken garden with a pond that contained goldfish, a vegetable patch, greenhouse and viewing platform. The garden was also used to commemorate the show's pets and notable events. A bust of the dog Petra was placed in the garden after her death in 1977. The remains of George the Tortoise were interred there in 2004. It had a sculpture of the Blue Peter ship, and a plaque honouring Percy Thrower, who died in 1988. The garden was often made available to other programmes for outside broadcasts such as the links between children's programmes during the summer months and for BBC Breakfast's weather forecasts.

On Monday 21 November 1983, Janet Ellis reported that over the weekend the garden had been vandalised. A rumour circulated in the early 1990s that the vandalism had been carried out by a gang that included the future English international footballers Dennis Wise and Les Ferdinand when they were teenagers. Both men denied any involvement, although Ferdinand did later appear to confess to "helping a few people over the wall." However, Ferdinand later recanted saying he had been making a joke and was never there. The destruction of the garden was depicted in Series 3 of Ashes to Ashes, which Gene Hunt is revealed to be the culprit.

=== Second garden in Salford ===
In September 2011, when the programme's production base moved to Dock10 in Salford, parts of the first garden including the sculptures and the sunken pond, were relocated to the piazza outside the new studio (53°28′20.26″N 2°17′48.95″W). The 2000 Blue Peter time capsule that was buried in London was also brought to the new location. It was due to be opened in 2029 but was accidentally dug up in 2017. Blue Peter's second garden was officially opened on Thursday 23 February 2012 by The Princess Royal. Like its predecessor, it continues to be used throughout the year for outdoor broadcasts and live events.

=== Royal Horticultural Society garden ===
In 2022, the BBC's centenary year, Blue Peter got a new temporary garden at the RHS Chelsea Flower Show. The new garden was inspired by the theme of 'Discover Soil'. The garden was designed by Juliet Sargeant, assisted by Richie Driss in design. The garden had soil-themed art, including projects created by the children and people of Salford. Garden visitors could listen to the sounds of a compost heap and in an underground observation chamber, they could watch what happens below ground. The garden was visited by some Blue Peter royalty, such as former presenter Lindsey Russell.

After the Chelsea Flower Show, the garden was moved to its permanent home of RHS Garden Bridgewater, which is open to the public.

== Main badges ==
Children (and adults) who appear on the show or achieve something notable may be awarded the coveted Blue Peter badge. The Blue Peter badge allows holders free entry into a number of visitor attractions across the UK. In March 2006, this privilege was temporarily suspended after a number of badges were discovered for sale on the auction site eBay. This suspension was lifted in June 2006, when a new "Blue Peter Badge Card" was introduced to combat the problem, which is issued to each badge winner to prove that they are the rightful owners.

The presenters almost always wear their badge; the only exception being when their apparel is incompatible (for example, a life jacket), in which case a sticker with the ship emblem is normally used instead. In addition, large prints or stickers of the ship are attached to vehicles driven by the presenters during filming assignments.

In addition to the standard Blue badge, several variations of the badge exist, for various achievements, including:

- Green badge, for contributions with a conservation, nature or environmental theme
- Orange badge, for competition winners and runners-up (replacing the previous circular "competition winner's badge")
- Sport badge, awarded for participation in sport or physical activity
- Music badge, awarded for participation in music-themed activities
- Book badge, awarded for demonstrating enthusiasm for reading
- Gold badge, the most rarely awarded, for exceptional achievement, bravery or endeavour.

Limited-edition badges have included:

- 50th Anniversary badge, awarded for sending a picture, poem or letter on the subject of the programme's 50th birthday
- Factbyte Factory badge, awarded to people who completed up to V.I.P. level 7 on the Factbyte factory online game on the official Blue Peter website in 2009
- Diamond badge, awarded to people from February 2018 to February 2019 to celebrate Blue Peter's 60th anniversary
- Doctor Who 60th Anniversary badge, for competition winners and runners-up of the Blue Peter and Doctor Who competition, celebrating the 60th Anniversary of the BBC science-fiction programme
- Silver and Blue badge, awarded to viewers who had already won a Blue badge, for a further achievement
- Silver badge, awarded for acts of kindness and supporting others
- Fan Club badge, a purple badge awarded for completing a review of the show and providing suggestions for future segments.

== Annual events ==
The programme also marks annual events, including Chinese New Year, St David's Day, Shrove Tuesday, Mothering Sunday, Guy Fawkes Night and Christmas. The latter, in particular, is a special occasion with a traditional format repeated year on year.

=== Shrove Tuesday ===
Usually shows one of the presenters making a pancake. It is usually the newest presenter who makes the pancake and attempts to toss it perfectly.

=== Mothering Sunday ===
Usually shows the viewers how to make their own Mother's Day card or present.

=== Guy Fawkes Night ===
Usually tells the history of Guy Fawkes and the Gunpowder Plot whilst the presenters tell viewers about the firework code and tips for a safe bonfire and fireworks night.

=== Appeals ===
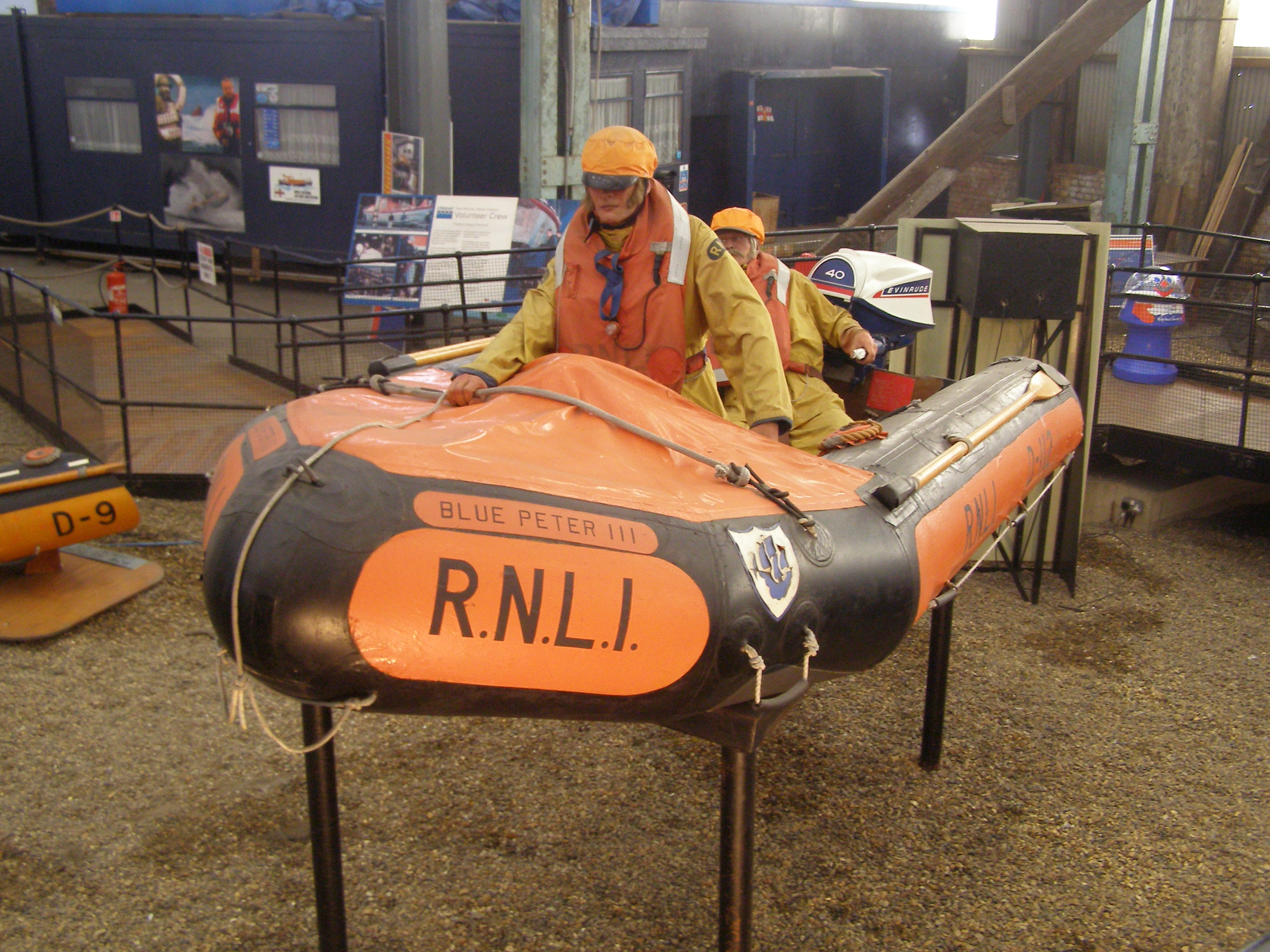
Blue Peter III, an RNLI D class lifeboat, one of 25 lifeboats funded by the programme, now part of the Royal National Lifeboat Collection on display at the Historic Dockyard, Chatham

From 1966, Blue Peter began an appeal to fund lifeboats for the RNLI. To date, 25 lifeboats have been funded by the appeal.

During appeals, the sum of money or objects collected is presented on the totaliser – a display that lights to show the amount collected. With some appeals, a second totaliser has often been introduced immediately after the original target has been met, with the aim of providing an incentive to keep on donating.

The 2008 appeal was called Mission Nutrition, an attempt to provide children in the UK, Bangladesh and South Africa with better food. As part of this appeal, the Blue Peter presenters held the world's biggest bring and buy sale on 18 February 2009, which was attended by several celebrities as well as regular people. Since the 2008 appeal there has been a return to regular features on the Appeal's progress in each edition, and the reinstatement of a physical studio set Totaliser.

"Send a Smile Appeal" was held in 2009. Children were encouraged to collect unwanted T-shirts to be donated to Operation Smile, a charity providing free reconstructive surgery to children in the developing world, where they were to be used as surgical gowns for their operations. Appeal contributors were encouraged to customise their gowns in a variety of creative ways, as well as following instructions given on the programme for how to include eyelets and ties to the backs of the gowns. In subsequent years, the traditional Appeal has been dropped in favour of general fundraising and awareness-raising for BBC Children in Need.

In 2018, it was announced that to celebrate Blue Peter's 60th year, it's 'Bring and Buy Sales' would be returning in aid of BBC Children in Need.

=== Book awards ===
From 2000 to 2022, Blue Peter promoted the Blue Peter Book Awards, a series of literary prizes for children's literature awarded annually.

== Time capsules ==
One of the most iconic parts of the show is its time capsules. The tradition began in 1971 when the first Blue Peter time capsule was buried, set to be opened in 2000 to demonstrate the next generations of viewers what daily life was like at the time, with viewers selecting what goes in the time capsule. Since then more time capsules have been buried and opened.

=== 1971–2000 ===
The first time capsule was buried by Valerie Singleton, John Noakes and Peter Purves in front of the BBC Television Centre on 7 June 1971. It was a steel box lined with lead and fastened with metal screws and two padlocks, however no thought was given to waterproofing the contents. It contained objects from the time such as documents describing the capsule's contents and the history of the show, an audiotape of the mascot dog Petra and cat Jason along with the show's theme tune and greetings from the presenters, a copy of the 1970 Blue Peter annual magazine, Blue Peter badges and booklets, a film reel of the show's coverage of an air race from the Isle of Man to Blackpool, a copy of the week's Radio Times, a set of decimal coins – which were introduced in 1971 – and photographs of the three presenters, the mascots, and the Blue Peter locomotive. The box had to be moved at two points in its long burial – first a few yards away a week later, after viewers sent in letters showing concerns that it would affect the root growth of a nearby tree, and second, when the original site of the capsule was due to be developed in 1984 so the box was unearthed and moved to another site in the Blue Peter garden.

On Friday 7 January 2000, the then-incumbent Blue Peter presenters joined Singleton, Noakes and Purves, who buried the capsule, to help unearth it. The team used a treasure map and thermal imaging to locate the box and then dug it up and opened it. Water had leaked into the box and partially damaged some items; however, most of the items were in surprisingly good condition. Editor Richard Marson decided that the opening of the capsule should not be broadcast live as it was unclear as to what would be discovered inside or even if the rusted container could even be opened. He was glad he made this decision when it became clear during the recording that the capsule had at some point been opened – probably at the time it was moved and reburied – and that the contents had been wrapped entirely differently from the original burial. By editing the video of the opening, he managed to avoid this becoming obvious to the viewers.

=== 1981–2022 ===
A second box made of wood and fastened with two padlocks was entombed in cement on 26 March 1981 by Simon Groom, Sarah Greene, Peter Duncan, and six students at the Samuel Lucas School in Hitchin, at the latter's request, within the structure of a multi-storey carpark at BBC Television Centre, with no intended opening date in mind. It marked the 10th anniversary of the 1971 capsule's burial and featured 'records of what life was like in the 1980s', including projects and drawings from the children on snack foods, dance, playground games, fashion, aircraft, travel, and sport. It also featured records from Blue Peter at the time, including photos of the presenters and their 'signature tunes', their script for the day, and tapes of the Blue Peter theme tune arranged by Mike Oldfield, as well as clips from the show of the carpark's construction.

It had been discovered by builders at BBC Television Centre in 2022 and was opened up on ITV's This Morning in June 2022 by Sarah Greene, Phillip Schofield and Holly Willoughby. Once again, the contents were severely degraded due to lack of waterproofing.

=== 1984–2000 ===
A third box, made of wood lined with lead and fastened with one padlock, was buried alongside the original by presenters Simon Groom, Peter Duncan and Janet Ellis on 12 April 1984, when the original was moved to the Blue Peter garden on 30 March that year. This box contained a collar for and six hairs from Goldie the Blue Peter Labrador, a vinyl record of the programme's theme tune arranged by Mike Oldfield, photographs of the show's presenters and mascots, more badges, the cover of the next Blue Peter book, and video footage of the moving of Petra's statue. The later capsule was dug up by Groom and Ellis in 2000; again, most of the artifacts were in poor shape, particularly the photographs, because of water seepage.

=== 1998–2017/2050 (The Millennium Time Capsule) ===
The fourth capsule, a metal cylinder without fasteners, was buried by Katy Hill and Richard Bacon in the floor beneath the Millennium Dome on 11 June 1998. As well as Blue Peter items including badges, a video tape of a segment on the Oblivion rollercoaster, an official CD-ROM, and a booklet on the history of the programme, the capsule contains a set of 1998 UK coins, a piece of felt from the Dome's roof, a set of Teletubby dolls, an insulin pen, a small yellow scarf and blue woggle, a France '98 football, a roller blade, an asthma inhaler, a Spice Girls compact disc, stamps of Princess Diana, a photo of Tony Blair with the construction crew, a picture of a dove to commemorate the Good Friday Agreement, a toy car, a video tape about a student's walk to school, and a copy of The Roald Dahl Treasury, all selected in a competition, alongside the selection announcement's videotape and 2,000 letters from competition entrants. The time capsule was set to be opened in 2050; however, in 2017, it was accidentally dug up by builders and damaged.

It was then taken to Salford Quays and restored successfully. In 2018, it was announced that, as part of the show's 60th birthday, the contents would go on tour with various past presenters meeting it at several locations, after which it would be stored in The National Archives until 2050.

=== 2000–2029 ===
Following the unearthing of the 1971 and 1984 time capsules on 7 January 2000, a fifth time capsule, a plastic barrel, was to be buried in the Blue Peter garden on 10 January. The capsule contains one of the recent Blue Peter books, two video tapes of the show's best bits from 1999, two video tapes of the 7 January 2000 unearthing, photographs of the presenters and crew of the show in 2000 as well as a medal celebrating the show's 40th birthday in 1998, more badges, and a small plush toy of George the tortoise. Matt Baker contributed a Geordie phrasebook, Simon Thomas an old Motorola Flare, Katy Hill a ring she bought in Mongolia, and Konnie Huq a CD of The Chemical Brothers album Surrender. The capsule was relocated to the new garden in 2011 with the programme's move to Salford Quays, and is due to be dug up in 2029.

=== 2018–2038 (The Diamond Time Capsule) ===
In 2018, the team announced a new time capsule for their 60th anniversary. Viewers suggested the contents of the time capsule through the website for the first time, and it is also to be stored in The National Archives, the first time it will not be buried. The contents include "a souvenir from the Royal Wedding between Prince Harry and Meghan Markle, 2018 set of UK coins and notes, a David Walliams book, fidget spinner, smartphone, World Cup 2018 sticker book and DVD of The Greatest Showman". The capsule was stored on the 60th birthday programme by a competition winner, who had won the chance to have her design printed onto the capsule, as well as presenters Radzi Chinyanganya, Lindsey Russell, Valorie Singleton, Peter Purves, Janet Ellis and Katy Hill.

== Books ==
In 1964, the first Blue Peter book was published by Lutterworth Press, by arrangement with the BBC. Due to the success of the book, the BBC produced an in house publication the following year.

In the early 1970s, a set of Blue Peter mini books were produced, covering specific topics that had been featured in the TV series. A set of these were buried in 1971 in the time capsule for the year 2000. The spin-off series Blue Peter Special Assignment also had books.

In 1973, a book about Paddington Bear's adventures with Blue Peter was published, called Paddington's Blue Peter Story Book.

In 2011, it was announced that, due to falling sales, the annuals would be scrapped. However, programme editor Tim Levell indicated that the book could return in the future.

== Broadcast history ==
=== BBC One (1958–2012) ===
Blue Peter first aired once a week on Mondays on the BBC Television Service, now BBC One, for a duration of 15 minutes. From 28 September 1964 until 1995 it was shown twice a week on Mondays and Thursdays, extending its duration to 25 minutes. A third show was added in 1995, broadcasting on Monday, Wednesday and Friday, and from 2000 the show began airing at 5 pm, due to Newsround moving to a later slot.

From 2006 the show's output began to be reduced, first by dropping the Friday edition, and initially moving the programme schedule to Monday to Wednesday, before moving again to Tuesday to Thursday. In May 2007, it was announced the show would lose a show a week and return to broadcasting twice weekly, leaving Tuesday and Wednesday the only days on which Blue Peter was broadcast on BBC One. At the time the BBC claimed that the purpose of returning to two shows a week was to increase the quality of the programme's content rather than simply a means of reducing production costs.

The show's schedule was changed again in February 2008 when Blue Peter was moved to the 4.35 pm slot on BBC One, due to The Weakest Link moving from BBC Two to replace Neighbours which had transferred to Five. However, this timing change led to a decrease in viewing figures for the weekday afternoon CBBC One slot, with Blue Peter receiving fewer than 100,000 viewers, down from around 335,000 in 2003. The BBC Trust recommended that the BBC produce plans, detailing how they intended to increase viewership, by mid-2009.

In September 2010, the show was moved from Wednesdays and Tuesdays to Mondays and Tuesdays at the same time slot.

On 21 December 2012, Blue Peter was shown on BBC One for the final time after 54 years and the show moved permanently to CBBC.

=== CBBC Channel (2012–) ===
From Thursday, 12 January 2012 another episode was dropped, with the show coming full circle by only broadcasting one new episode each week. For the first time in the show's history, first run episodes were now broadcast on the CBBC Channel, at 5:45 pm on Thursdays. However, a repeat was still broadcast the following day on BBC One.

Eventually however, in December 2012, Blue Peter ended its 54-year run on BBC One and now airs only on the CBBC Channel. The move came as regular children's programming was removed entirely from BBC One and Two following the completion of the digital switchover. Viewing figures determined that 93% of CBBC's target audience was now watching the BBC's children's programming on the dedicated CBBC Channel (including first-run episodes of Blue Peter), and few viewers were watching solely on BBC One.

=== Repeats and spin-off shows ===
Blue Peter was first repeated in full on satellite and cable channel UK Gold in the 1990s, one of the first archive channels in the UK. Later it moved to sister channel UK Gold Classics when UK Gold began broadcasting more recent programmes, although that channel lasted only six months before closing.

In 2017, Blue Peter Bite, a five-minute programme which features challenges previously shown on the programme was introduced. However, this has since been renamed Blue Peter Challenges, and only includes challenges.

=== Summary ===
| | Monday | Tuesday | Wednesday | Thursday | Friday |
|---|---|---|---|---|---|
| 1958–1959 | | | | Yes | |
| 1959–1960 | | | | | Yes |
| 1960–1964 | Yes | | | | |
| 1964–1994 | Yes | | | Yes | |
| 1994–2006 | Yes | | Yes | | Yes |
| 2006 | Yes | Yes | Yes | | |
| 2007 | | Yes | Yes | Yes | |
| 2007–2010 | | Yes | Yes | | |
| 2010–2011 | Yes | Yes | | | |
| 2012–2021 | | | | Yes | |
| 2022– | | | | | Yes |

== Signature tune and motif ==
The signature tune has always been a hornpipe, originally using variations of Barnacle Bill by Herbert Ashworth-Hope (not to be confused with the bawdy American drinking song "Barnacle Bill the Sailor"). The original version of the theme was a recording by the New Century Orchestra issued by the FDH Mood Music library. From the 2008 series, the theme became a rendition of the similar Sailor's Hornpipe. However, from 14 October 2008, the tune has been a blend of both tunes.

=== Opening theme ===
The following is a list of all the versions of the Blue Peter signature tune that have been used on the show:

- Sidney Torch & The New Century Orchestra: October 1958 to January 1979
- Mike Oldfield: January 1979 to June 1989 (see "Blue Peter" (Mike Oldfield instrumental))
- Simon Brint: September 1989 to September 1992
- Simon Brint: September 1992 to September 1994
- The Yes/No People: September 1994 to August 1999
- David Arnold and the BBC Philharmonic Orchestra: September 1999 to June 2004
- Nial Brown: September 2004 to December 2006
- Dave Cooke: January 2007 to June 2007
- Dave Cooke & The Blue Peter Music Makers: September 2007 to June 2008
- Dobs Vye: September 2008 – June 2011
- Banks & Wag: September 2011 – May 2021
- Sanj Sen: June 2021 – present

The debut of a new version of the theme tune is sometimes accompanied with an introduction by the presenters at the time explaining the reasons behind the new rendition.

In 2006, a new version was arranged and recorded by Murray Gold as part of the Music Makers competition, with prize winners taking part in the final orchestral recording. Viewers were told that this recording would be used when the series returned from its summer break in September 2006; however, for unknown reasons this was not the case, save for excerpts being used as incidental music. Instead, when the September 2006 series began, a slightly shortened version of the 2004 arrangement was used, with Sailor's Hornpipe and the opening bars removed. Between January and June 2007, Dave Cooke (who was the husband of ex-presenter Tina Heath) re-arranged the theme tune, although it was confirmed that Murray Gold's new arrangement would be used from the new series in September 2007, to coincide with the programme's 50th anniversary celebrations. However, the version that ultimately aired bears little resemblance to either the original Murray Gold/Music Makers recording or any previous recording of the theme.

For the start of the September 2008 series, Barnacle Bill was dropped after nearly fifty years and replaced by an arrangement of the very similar Sailor's Hornpipe. On 14 October (the same week as the 50th anniversary) the opening tune was reworked to include elements of "Barnacle Bill" once again. The closing theme for 2008 was the same as the opening signature tune.

In September 2011, the series returned to using "Barnacle Bill" though with the opening bars and drum roll omitted and the traditional closing signature tune not used. On 16 October 2018 (the same week as the 60th anniversary), the opening tune was remixed like the 50th anniversary one, which is composed by David Roocroft.

A new version of the Blue Peter theme and opening titles was introduced in 2021.

=== Closing theme ===
There is little or no record of the closing music of Blue Peter in its earliest days, but by the mid-1960s, the show was closing with an edit of Parts Two and Three of Drums and Fife, from a 1961 suite of six library cues by Wilfred Burns, performed by The Light Symphonia, conducted by Roberto Capelli (Conroy, BM 301-A). This recording remained in use until January 1979 when it was replaced by an arrangement by Mike Oldfield.

The track continued to be rearranged along with subsequent versions of the opening theme until 1999, when Drums and Fife was dropped and the opening theme was instead used to close the show. Drums and Fife returned in an arrangement by Nial Brown used from 2004 to 2006, and then by Dave Cooke as of January 2007. From September 2007 to June 2008 the closing theme was slightly extended and rearranged, again by Dave Cooke. From 2008 Drums and Fife was dropped again with the closing theme being the same as opening signature tune.

=== Motif ===
The programme's motif is a stylised sailing ship designed by Tony Hart. Hart's original design was never successfully used in a totally uniform fashion, with several different reproductions used in studio, on badges, the Blue Peter books and on-screen graphics. This was until the show's redesign in 1999, when the ship's rigging and hull detail was removed, and in 2000, the flags were subtly reshaped. For the 2008 series there has been a return to the original flag design on the ship, although some of the mast detail on the bow and stern has been removed.

=== Opening titles ===
1958–1989: The original opening titles showed a Blue Peter flag being lowered on a ship.

2011–2013: The new Blue Peter titles were created by Mighty Giant. The titles were meant to capture the essence of the show in 20 short seconds. The sequence Mighty Giant created had the presenters playing and throwing an object that changes throughout. As it transforms it captures another element of Blue Peter. These objects include for Helen, the Blue Peter adventure box, Technology screen and a ball. Barney's elements of Blue Peter in the titles include a globe, a piece of gaming technology and a keyboard. Mighty Giant shot the presenters against a green screen and then combined them with 3d objects back at its Northern Quarter base to create the desired effect. The logo also had a make over with the ship being put into a blue circle and the original designed ship in white inside the circle. The writing is the same as the 2008 logo.

== Controversy ==
=== Dismissal of Richard Bacon ===
In October 1998, Richard Bacon became the first presenter to have his contract terminated mid-run, after he admitted to taking cocaine and punching a wall, following reports in a tabloid newspaper. Lorraine Heggessey, then the Head of BBC Children's programmes, apologised on air.

Before the dismissal of Bacon in 1998, four previous presenters had left the programme when their contracts were not renewed, each for different reasons: these were Leila Williams in 1962, Christopher Wenner in 1980, Michael Sundin in 1985 and Romana D'Annunzio in 1998.

=== Fake phone competition winner ===
It was revealed by the BBC that a phone-in competition supporting the UNICEF "Shoe Biz Appeal", held on 27 November 2006, was rigged. The person who appeared to be calling in the competition was actually a Blue Peter Team Player who was visiting that day. The visitor pretended to be a caller from an outside line who had won the phone-in and the chance to select a prize. The competition was rigged due to a technical error when receiving the calls.

Former editor Biddy Baxter, described as still being influential with the programme at the time, explained the problem as an issue with a member of the production team on the studio floor and the Editor being oblivious to the situation in the studio gallery. She also went on to say that the programme would not feature premium rate telephone competitions in the future.

It was announced on 16 May 2007 that Blue Peter's editor and unofficial historian, Richard Marson, had stood down from his job, although any link to the controversy of March 2007 remains in doubt.

In July 2007, Blue Peter was given a £50,000 fine by the Office of Communications (OFCOM) as a result of rigging the competition.

=== Political partiality ===
On 24 November 1988, Frank Ruse, a left-wing Labour councillor for Liverpool City Council, accompanied Liverpool's Pagoda Chinese Youth Orchestra to London for an appearance on Blue Peter. He was given a Blue Peter badge and later wore it to council meetings. However, he received a BBC headed letter requesting the return of the badge. The letter (which was later discovered to be a forgery) stated that Blue Peter had been approached by the office of Neil Kinnock (Labour leader at the time) who were alarmed that the badge had been given to a councillor with hard-left views. On receiving the Blue Peter badge from Ruse, the BBC wrote back to him stating that they had sent no such letter, thereby revealing it to be a hoax. Ruse started a local and national enquiry to find out who was responsible for the letter.

In August 2007 while the programme was off air for its annual Summer Expedition, long-time presenter Konnie Huq appeared at a press conference to promote the health benefits of cycling along with Mayor of London, Ken Livingstone. The Conservative Party accused the BBC of political bias as a result of one of its employees appearing at what was construed as a pro-Labour Party event. The BBC claimed to have turned down the offer for Huq to appear, but this was unknown to both her and her agent.

=== "Socks" ===
In September 2007, an online vote on the BBC's Blue Peter official website took place to choose the name of the eighth Blue Peter kitten in January: the reported story was that, instead of calling the cat "Cookie" as chosen by a majority of the votes, the staff overruled the vote and called the kitten "Socks", citing problems with the voting system and a large surge in the former name. As a result of negative media coverage, the original cat, Socks, was joined by another kitten named Cookie, as had been chosen in the online vote. The BBC broadcast an apology on 25 September 2007 at the start of the new series.

== Tributes, honours and awards ==
In 1992, Blue Peter won the BAFTA for Best Children's Programme (Factual): Lewis Bronze.

Asteroid 16197 Bluepeter is named in its honour. The asteroid was discovered on 7 January 2000, the day that the Blue Peter time capsules from 1971 and 1984 were unearthed.

In a list of the 100 Greatest British Television Programmes drawn up by the British Film Institute in 2000, voted for by industry professionals, Blue Peter was placed 6th.

In 2008, Blue Peter was nominated for the BAFTA Children's Kids Vote Award.

== See also ==
- BBC
- CBBC
- Go With Noakes
- Duncan Dares
- Junior Magazine

== Bibliography ==
- Baxter, Biddy; Barnes, Edward; Adcock, John (1979). Blue Peter Sixteenth Book. London: British Broadcasting Corporation. ISBN 0-563-17723-3. OCLC 1244497210.
- Baxter, Biddy; Barnes, Edward (1989). Blue Peter: The Inside Story. Letchworth, Herts, UK: Ringpress. ISBN 0-948955-50-3. OCLC 24721898.
