= Anita West =

British actress and former television presenter

- Occupations: Actress, television presenter
- Known for: Blue Peter
- Spouse: Ray Ellington (m. 1956; div. 1962)
- Children: 2

Anita West is a British former actress and television presenter.

== Blue Peter ==
On 7 May 1962, West joined the British children's television show Blue Peter as co-host, following the departure of Leila Williams. She remained with the programme for only sixteen editions, the last being shown on 3 September 1962, making her one of the programme's shortest-serving presenters (other than stand-ins Ann Taylor, Tony Hart and Sandra Michaels). She voluntarily resigned from the show because of her imminent divorce (in 1962) from the musician Ray Ellington; she believed that audiences would find it inappropriate for a divorcée to present a children's programme. West never divulged her reasons for leaving to the producers, who deemed her "unprofessional" for simply walking out on the show.

West's tenure was so short that, for several decades, she was not officially recognised as a Blue Peter presenter, only being added to the official list of presenters upon the show's 40th anniversary in 1998. In contrast, her replacement, Valerie Singleton, ahead of whom West had come in earlier auditions, became the show's longest-serving female presenter until Konnie Huq. Additionally, due to the BBC's policy of not recording programmes at the time, no footage of West's time on Blue Peter exists.

== Later career ==
After leaving Blue Peter, West appeared in such shows as Space: 1999, Crossroads as Doctor Hilary Maddox, The Saint and Lovejoy. She also briefly returned to Blue Peter in 1998 to appear in its pantomime.

In the 1970s, she was a PR hostess at the Palm Beach Casino Club in Mayfair.

She appeared in the films Impact (1963), Shadow of Fear (1964), Ring of Spies (1964) and Joey Boy (1965).

== Personal life ==
West was married to Ray Ellington for six years; the couple had a son, Lance, and a daughter, Nina. In 1998, she told Blue Peter's 40th-anniversary documentary BP Confidential that she had no regrets about quitting the show, other than on a professional level, as her children were the most important thing in her life.
