= Simon Thomas (presenter) =

British television presenter (born 1973)

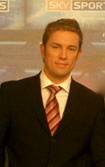
- Thomas on the set of Sky Sports News
- Born: 1972 or 1973 (age 53–54); Norfolk, England
- Education: Birmingham University
- Occupation: Presenter
- Spouses: Gemma Thomas (m. 2005; died 2017) Derrina Jebb (m. 2021)
- Children: 3

Simon Thomas (born 26 January 1973) is an English television presenter who hosts Soccer Saturday on Sky Sports. Thomas also worked on Blue Peter for six years, and presented live Premier League football for Sky Sports from 2016 to 2018.

== Broadcasting career ==
=== Blue Peter ===
Having applied for the job three times, Thomas began presenting the children's programme Blue Peter on 8 January 1999 replacing the sacked presenter Richard Bacon. Previously he had worked as a runner at Children's BBC and the radio station LBC. During his tenure at Blue Peter, he ran in the London Marathon twice and two Great North Runs, climbed Mount Kilimanjaro and Mont Blanc, completed over 40 solo sky dives with the Royal Air Force, presented a medal at the Commonwealth Games, ran in the 60 metres sprint at the Norwich Union Indoor Athletics against Frankie Fredericks and Darren Campbell and even directed an edition of the show. He also presented the Queen with a Gold Blue Peter badge when she visited the studio and remarked on presenting Her Majesty with the badge that "she could get into the Tower of London free with it."

Thomas co-presented with Stuart Miles, Katy Hill, Konnie Huq, Matt Baker, Liz Barker and Zöe Salmon.

Thomas announced his intention to leave Blue Peter in January 2005, and his last live show was aired on 25 April of that year.

=== BBC ===
Thomas presented CBBC Proms in the Park in Hyde Park in 2001 with Matt Baker and Faye Tozer, and in 2002 with Fearne Cotton. He also presented BBC Radio 3's Making Tracks with Matt Baker.

=== Sky Sports ===
After leaving the BBC, Thomas joined Sky Sports in June 2005 and presented the 15:00–19:00 shift on Sky Sports News, alongside Georgie Thompson. He also presented Cricket AM during the summer on Sky Sports 1 with Sarah-Jane Mee and has presented the Sky Sports Victory Shield, England's U21s games, Centenary Shield, International Cricket, Sky Sports News Cricket World Cup Report, the Mosconi Cup from Las Vegas, Sky Sports World Cup report from Cape Town 2010 and Sky Sports News's coverage of the 2010 Ryder Cup.

At the start of the 2010/2011 Football Season, Thomas became the lead presenter of Sky Sports' live Football League coverage, leaving his position on Sky Sports News. From 2014, Thomas began presenting live League Cup football on Sky Sports, following Ben Shephard stepping down from all live match presenting duties. From August 2016, Thomas has presented live Premier League coverage, most notably on Saturday lunch times and bank holidays, following the departure of Ed Chamberlin to ITV Racing, and David Jones' subsequent promotion to Super Sunday and Monday Night Football lead presenter. Thomas regularly works alongside pundits such as Graeme Souness, Jamie Redknapp and Thierry Henry.

=== This Morning ===
In May 2019 Thomas took part in a three-part miniseries for This Morning called 'Pursuits of Happiness'. The series showed three different activities people took part in to overcome and deal with their mental health issues.

In September 2019 Thomas appeared on the show to raise awareness for blood cancer symptoms.

== Personal life ==
Thomas married his first wife, Gemma, in 2005. They had one child, and lived in Berkshire. Gemma died in 2017. Thomas married his second wife, Derrina Jebb, in 2021. They had a daughter in 2022, and a son in 2024. The family live in Buckinghamshire.

Thomas is a Christian, lifelong supporter of Norwich City, and vice-president of the Norwich City Supporters Trust.
