= Lindsey Russell =

British television presenter and former Blue Peter presenter

- Born: Lindsey Russell; 25 September 1990 (age 35); Brussels, Belgium
- Occupation: Television presenter
- Years active: 2013–present
- Television: Blue Peter (2013–2021); Taking the Next Step (2016–2017)

Lindsey Russell (born 25 September 1990) is a British television presenter. She is best known for being the thirty-sixth presenter of the long-running British BBC television programme Blue Peter, which she co-hosted from 2013 to 2021 with Barney Harwood, Radzi Chinyanganya, Helen Skelton, Richie Driss, Mwaksy Mudenda and Adam Beales.

== Career ==
Russell was successful in a competition to find the next presenter for Blue Peter that attracted 20,000 applicants and was judged by a panel that included TV presenters Eamonn Holmes and Myleene Klass. She won the role shortly after graduating from the University of Bristol after a four-year French and drama course.

In 2016, Russell attempted to cross the 21 miles between Northern Ireland and Scotland in a three-metre zorb in aid of Sport Relief. She had to abort the attempt due to bad weather. She left Blue Peter on 15 July 2021, breaking a world record for the fastest time to dress in cricket whites on her last show.

It was announced on 16 December 2021 that Russell would join Heart Radio in January 2022 to present Saturdays and Sundays from 1am to 6am. From 2023, Russell presents the early breakfast slot from Monday to Friday from 4–6:30am on Heart Radio.

== Filmography ==
Year	Title	Role	Notes
2013	Blue Peter: You Decide	Herself	Contestant; 5 episodes
2013–2021	Blue Peter	Herself	Co-host
2013	Dani's Castle	Herself	1 episode
2014; 2016	Hacker Time	Herself	Guest; 1 episode Cameo; 1 episode
2015	World Snooker Championship	Herself	Guest; 2 episodes
2015	Ultimate Brain	Herself	Contestant; 1 episode
2016	Kung Fu Panda 3	Peony (voice)	
2016, 2018, 2019	Sam & Mark's Big Friday Wind-Up	Herself	Guest; 3 episodes
2016	Too Much TV	Herself	Guest; 1 episode
2016	Danger Mouse	Hysteria (voice)	2 episodes
2016–2017	Taking the Next Step	Herself	Host; 21 episodes
2016	Top Class	Herself	Contestant; Christmas special 2016
2017	The Next Step	Herself	Fictionalised version of Herself
2017	Art Ninja	Herself	Cameo
2017	Saturday Mash-Up!	Herself	1 episode
2018	This Morning	Herself	Competitions segment; co-presenter with Radzi Chinyanganya for 1 week
2019	Horrible Histories: The Movie – Rotten Romans	Celt Villager	Cameo
