= Richie Driss =

Former Blue Peter presenter

Richie Driss is an English television presenter, best known for presenting the weekly CBBC programme Blue Peter, being the 38th presenter on the show.

== Early life and career ==
Driss was born in St Albans, Hertfordshire. He attended both Roundwood Park and Sir John Lawes School in Harpenden. He studied Film and Television at Aberystwyth University. He joined Blue Peter as its 38th presenter in May 2019, replacing Radzi Chinyanganya.

On 3 February 2023, Driss announced that he would leave the show, with his last show to be aired on 3 March.

On 25 March 2024, the BBC announced Driss would be joining BBC Radio 1 as part of the Friday Early Breakfast line-up.
