= Juliet Sargeant =

British garden designer (born 1965)

Juliet Sargeant MBE
- Born: September 1965 (age 60); Tanzania
- Education: Royal Free Hospital School of Medicine; Middlesex University
- Occupations: physician garden designer
- Awards: RHS gold medal BBC People's Choice Award
- Website: julietsargeant.com/

Juliet Rose Bagaya Sargeant MBE (born September 1965) is a British garden designer. In 2016, her anti-slavery The Modern Slavery Garden was the first show garden by a female black gardener to be exhibited at the Chelsea Flower Show where it won an RHS (Royal Horticultural Society) gold medal and was voted the winner in the BBC's People's Choice Award.

== Early life and education ==
She was born in Tanzania to an English mother and a Tanzanian father who had met while he was studying law in London. She moved to England at the age of two. After growing up and going to school in Surrey and Sussex, she qualified as a doctor at the Royal Free Hospital School of Medicine, University of London in 1990. During her studies she also gained a 1st Class Honours Degree in Psychology intending to pursue a career in psychiatry.

== Career ==
Sargeant left medicine after working as a doctor for four years, returning to university to study garden design at Capel Manor College and Middlesex University gaining her degree in 1997. She now lives in Rottingdean near Brighton, and runs a successful garden design business and The Sussex Garden School from offices based in Hurstpierpoint and Alfriston, while also writing books such as New Naturalism and presenting television programmes such as BBC Gardener's World and ITV's Village of the Year. She is an active member of the Society of Garden Designers and was their chair from 2014 to 2015, taking on the role when the previous chair suddenly resigned. She was awarded Fellowship of SGD in 2017 for her contributions to the society. In 2018, she was listed as one of BBC's 100 Women.

== Awards and accolades ==
- 2016 GG2 Leadership Award
- 2016 Evening Standard Top 100 People
- 2017 SGD Hard Landscaping Award
- 2012 SGD Sustainability Award
- 2020 Fellowship of the Landscape Institute
