= Christopher Trace =

British television presenter (1933–1992)

- Christopher Trace on Blue Peter
- Born: 21 March 1933; Hambledon, Surrey, England
- Died: 5 September 1992 (aged 59); Tower Hamlets, London, England
- Education: Cranleigh School, Surrey; Royal Military Academy Sandhurst
- Occupations: Journalist; Actor; Television presenter
- Known for: Original Blue Peter presenter with Leila Williams
- Children: 3

Christopher Leonard Trace (21 March 1933 – 5 September 1992) was an English actor and television presenter, notable for his nine years as an original presenter of the BBC children's programme Blue Peter.

== Early life and career ==
Trace was the youngest of three children born to Edith (née Morley) and Lawrence Archibald Trace. His two older siblings were Ann and David Morley Trace.

Trace was educated at Cranleigh School, a boarding independent school in the town of Cranleigh in Surrey, which he left early.

After working as a farm labourer, he joined the British Army and trained at the Royal Military Academy Sandhurst. Trace received a commission in the Royal Regiment of Artillery of the British Army in 1953. He was promoted to lieutenant in February 1955, but resigned his commission in September 1956. Trace then had a relatively undistinguished acting career. In 1959, he played a detective, in 'Wrong Number', made at Merton Park Studios; and notably, Charlton Heston's body double in Ben-Hur (1959).

== Broadcaster ==
At the age of 25, and alongside his co-presenter Leila Williams, Trace launched Blue Peter. The programme's very first episode was broadcast on 16 October 1958, and Trace's final episode was broadcast on 24 July 1967.

According to the BBC, Trace landed the role after bonding with producer John Hunter Blair over their shared love of model railways. During his time hosting Blue Peter, he was also a regular presenter on the BBC Schools programme Signpost from 1961 to 1965.

By 1967, the Blue Peter production team were beginning to find Trace hard to deal with and were looking to replace him on the show, particularly when his wife divorced him for sleeping with another woman during a 1965 Blue Peter summer expedition to Norway. The couple had two children. Trace often threatened to resign and once the production team were happy that viewers had accepted John Noakes as a member of the team, Trace's next resignation was accepted.

He became a writer and production manager for a film company named Spectator which failed after two years, losing him his life savings. He was declared bankrupt in 1973, then returned to the BBC, first on local television in East Anglia and then on the network TV programme Nationwide. In the 1970s, he worked as a presenter on BBC East's daily morning radio programme Roundabout East Anglia, a regional opt-out from the Today programme on BBC Radio 4. He also appeared on local television as a presenter on BBC's early evening news programme Look East.

== Later life ==
By the mid-1970s, he had retired from the media, and briefly worked behind the bar of a pub near Norwich before becoming general manager of an engineering factory, where he lost two toes in an accident. On Blue Peter's 20th anniversary in 1978, he appeared on the show; further, the factory where he worked shut for the day so that the workforce could watch his appearance. On the show, without warning anyone, he announced that he wanted to give an Outstanding Endeavour Award. The award became an annual Blue Peter event. In the 1980s, he worked in the press office of the Soldiers, Sailors, Airmen and Families Association (SSAFA). In the 1990s, he briefly returned to the BBC to guest on and later host the nostalgia series Are You Sitting Comfortably? on Radio 2.

== Death ==
Trace died in 1992 from cancer of the oesophagus while living in Walthamstow. Valerie Singleton and Biddy Baxter visited him in hospital days before his death.

== Quotations ==
The Oxford Dictionary of National Biography credits Trace with coining two phrases that have become prominent in British popular culture: the line "And now for something completely different", later taken up by, and usually attributed to, Monty Python, and "Here's one I made earlier", since adopted by nearly all subsequent presenters on Blue Peter.

== Sources ==
- Alistair McGown, "Trace, Christopher Leonard (1933–1992)", Oxford Dictionary of National Biography, online edition, Oxford University Press, Oct 2005; online edn, May 2006 accessed 10 June 2006
