= John Hunter Blair =

British television producer (1903–1964)

John Blair
- Born: John Hunter Blair; 4 August 1903
- Died: 31 December 1964 (aged 61)
- Occupation: Television producer
- Known for: Creator of Blue Peter

John Hunter Blair (4 August 1903 – 31 December 1964) was a British television producer. He was the creator of Blue Peter, and was its producer from 1958 to 1961. Asked by Owen Read, head of BBC children's television, to devise a programme for children who were now too old for Watch with Mother, the programme began on 16 October 1958 and lasted for fifteen minutes.

John Wauchope Hunter Blair was born in 1903 to Ethel, wife of Major-General Walter Hunter Blair. He attended the Royal Naval Colleges at Osborne and Dartmouth. After studying at Edinburgh University, he did an MA in Modern History at Oriel College, Oxford, before becoming a school teacher.

Hunter Blair went to work at the University of Riga in 1933 and worked in radio for the Latvian State Broadcasting Service. In 1940 he moved to Australia and worked for the Australian Broadcasting Service, before returning to the UK in 1947 and working for the BBC.

Illness forced Hunter Blair to leave Blue Peter in 1961.
