= Abby Cook (television presenter) =

Scottish wheelchair racer and TV presenter (born 2000s)

Abby Cook (born 2002) is a Scottish television presenter and wheelchair racer. In March 2023, she became the 42nd presenter of CBBC programme Blue Peter.

== Early life ==
Cook was born in 2002 in Falkirk. She was diagnosed at birth with Ehlers–Danlos syndrome (EDS). She was active in competitive swimming and cross country running until age 12, when her condition made it impossible to continue. She attended St Bernadette's Primary in Stenhousemuir and Grangemouth High School, and then studied applied biological science at Forth Valley College. Cook said that she stayed at home for six months and missed two years of school due to her diagnosis, and later began wheelchair racing.

Cook worked with Forth Valley Disability Sport and as a mental health project administrator for Disability Sport Scotland, as well as uploading videos to TikTok as "hotwheels007". As of March 2023, she was training with Paralympians twice weekly for the club Forth Valley Flyers.

== Television work ==
On 6 March 2023, 20-year-old Cook was announced as the 42nd presenter of Blue Peter, the magazine show that first aired in 1958 and was airing on CBBC at the time. She was its first wheelchair-using presenter. She made her debut on 10 March, and her first challenge was to abseil down Millers Dale viaduct in the Peak District national park.

In 2024, Cook appeared on Would I Lie to You?, as a contestant. Later that year she won an episode of Celebrity Mastermind, with her specialist subject being the BBC series Sherlock. She was a contestant on Do You Know Your Place? in 2026.

== Achievements ==
In April 2024, Cook was named in The Sunday Times' inaugural Young Power List of 25 high achievers aged under 30 in the United Kingdom and Ireland.

On 21 March 2025, on the set of Blue Peter, Cook set the Guinness World Record for most manual wheelchair spins in 30 seconds by a woman, with 31.

On 5 March 2026, World Book Day, Cook hosted a reading lesson for 6,715 children at Portsmouth F.C.'s Fratton Park stadium. The event surpassed the previous Guinness World Record of 3,509 participants in Eastbourne in 2024.

At the 2026 British Rowing Club Championships, Cook became national champion in the W AR1/2 1x category with a record time of 11:33.40 for Agecroft Rowing Club.
