= Leila Williams =

English beauty pageant winner

- Education: Chuckery School, Walsall
- Occupation: Television presenter
- Known for: Blue Peter
- Spouse: Fred Mudd
- Children: 1
- Beauty pageant titleholder
- Title: Miss Great Britain 1957
- Major competitions: Miss Great Britain 1957 (Winner); Miss World 1957 (Unplaced)

Leila Williams is a British TV host, model and beauty pageant titleholder who was crowned Miss Great Britain 1957 and represented her country at Miss World 1957. She was one of the original presenters of Blue Peter, working on the programme from 1958 to 1962.

== Career ==
In 1957 Williams won the Miss Great Britain title. The following year she became the first female Blue Peter presenter, co-presenting with Christopher Trace. Williams recalled Michael Bond being a cameraman on the very first episode, and that she did not expect even to be invited back again.

Williams left Blue Peter at the start of 1962, after being made redundant by Clive Parkhurst, a newly appointed producer, with whom she did not get on. She recalled that "he could not find anything for me to do". In October 1961, Williams did not appear for six editions, and was eventually sacked, leaving Trace on his own or with one-off presenters. Parkhurst was replaced by John Furness. Williams is the only Blue Peter presenter of whom no footage survives, as episodes were either not recorded or were erased due to the BBC's wiping policy at the time.

Williams went on to play small parts in the films Watch Your Stern, Marriage of Convenience and The Beauty Jungle, and returned to Blue Peter for the show's 20th anniversary in 1978 and subsequently the 35th anniversary in 1993 40th in 1998 and the 60th in 2018.

== Personal life ==
Williams married Fred Mudd, lead singer of the music group The Mudlarks.

Whilst the Mudlarks were touring in the early 1970s, she worked as an assistant manager at a Dorothy Perkins clothing store in Harrow. Williams and Mudd then ran public houses in Kingston-upon-Thames and Surbiton for many years before retiring to Spain.
