= Radzi Chinyanganya =

British television presenter (born 1987)

- Born: Munyaradzi Thomas Kingsley Chinyanganya; 12 September 1987 (age 38); Oxford, Oxfordshire, England
- Education: Loughborough University Haberdashers' Adams
- Occupation: Presenter
- Years active: 2012–present
- Television: Blue Peter (2013–2019); WWE NXT UK (2018–2020); Cannonball (2017)

Munyaradzi Chinyanganya (born 12 September 1987) is a British television presenter and broadcaster. He co-presented the BBC children's TV programme Blue Peter from 2013 until 2019, and the ITV game show Cannonball in 2017. Previously he presented Wild on CBBC and was the host of Match of the Day Kickabout from 2013 until 2014, when Ben Shires took over. He provided the commentary for the 2018 World's Ultimate Strongman.

== Early life ==
Chinyanganya was born in Oxford, Oxfordshire, and lived there for his first ten years, subsequently moving to Wolverhampton where he spent his teenage years. He was born to a Scottish mother and a Zimbabwean father. He attended Adams' Grammar School in Newport, Shropshire. A graduate of Loughborough University, he worked on Loughborough University's TV and radio station while a student.

Following university he pursued an attempt to join the British skeleton bobsleigh team for the 2014 Winter Olympics, although he was unsuccessful in qualification rounds.

== Career ==
=== Sports hosting ===
At a screen test in The O2 Arena, he was selected as the official weightlifting presenter at the London 2012 Olympics. He hosted the weightlifting tournament, spoke on stage at the Excel Arena, interviewed athletes, introduced the weight categories and entertained the crowd. He was invited back to present the London 2012 Paralympic Games. He was a presenter with the BBC coverage of the 2018 Winter Olympics in Pyeongchang, South Korea and the 2020 Snooker World Championship, Sheffield. He was also the official commentator of the 2018 World's Ultimate Strongman Competition in Dubai.

In 2021, Chinyanganya was part of the Eurosport presenting team at the Tokyo Olympics. It was later announced he would become the main presenter for snookers' Triple Crown events on Eurosport, taking over from Colin Murray who had departed the role at the end of the 2020–21 snooker season.

=== Television ===
Chinyanganya presented Your Body: Your Image for BBC Two, an educational series about body image in schools. He co-presented Wild on CBBC with Naomi Wilkinson and Tim Warwood which first aired in 2013. In October 2013, he became the 37th presenter of Blue Peter after being announced following the departure of Helen Skelton. He was a reporter and presenter of CBBC's Match of the Day Kickabout.

In January 2020, he competed in the twelfth series of Dancing on Ice alongside professional partner Jess Hatfield.

=== Other work ===
He was a contestant in Sky One's Gladiators in 2008 and reached the semi-finals and was the only contestant in history to attempt the eliminator wearing a swimming cap. He was selected to attend Kiss FM's Presenter Academy, and spent the whole summer online reporting for Bauer Media radio station. In this role he interviewed artists and the public and sampled Olympic entertainment in London.

He has a cameo as Mi in Kung Fu Panda 3.

== Personal life ==
He is a Christian, and has said that his faith is one of his driving passions. He has described his parents as being Christians, but from different Christian denominations, leading to an inter-faith upbringing. In November 2020 Chinyanganya announced on the BBC's Songs of Praise programme that his own baptism had taken place at the Roman Catholic church of St Leonard and St Fergus in Ardler, a suburb of Dundee, his mother's hometown.

== Filmography ==
=== Television ===
Year	Title	Role	Channel
2008	Gladiators	Contestant	Sky One
2012	2012 Summer Olympics	Weightlifting host	BBC Red Button
2012	Your Body: Your Image	Presenter	BBC Two
2013–14	Wild	Presenter	CBBC
2013–14	Match of the Day Kickabout	Presenter	CBBC
2013–2019	Blue Peter	Presenter	CBBC
2014	Gareth's All-Star Choir	Himself	BBC One
2014; 2016–17	The Dog Ate My Homework	Panelist; 3 episodes	CBBC
2014	Hacker Time	Guest	CBBC
2015–present	Songs of Praise	Co-presenter	BBC One
2015	Celebrity Mastermind	Contestant	BBC One
2016	London Marathon 2016	Reporter	BBC One
2016	Rank the Prank	Himself	CBBC
2016	Great South Run 2016	Presenter	Channel 5
2017	Remotely Funny	Contestant	CBBC
2017	Art Ninja	Himself; Cameo	CBBC
2017	Celebrity Eggheads	Contestant	BBC Two
2017	Cannonball	Co-presenter	ITV
2017	Strictly Come Dancing: Children in Need 2017	Contestant	BBC One
2018	2018 Winter Olympics	Presenter	BBC One, BBC Four
2018	Ninja Warrior UK	Contestant	ITV
2018	The Crystal Maze	Contestant	Channel 4
2018–2020	NXT UK	Backstage Interviewer	WWE Network
2019	Crufts	Backstage Interviewer	Channel 4
2020	Dancing on Ice	Contestant	ITV
2020	World Snooker Championships	Presenter	BBC
2021	Beat The Chasers: Celebrity Special	Contestant	ITV
2022	World Snooker Championships	Presenter	Eurosport
2022	Formula E	Presenter	Channel 4, Formula E TV
2023	Good Morning Britain	Guest Entertainment Presenter - April	ITV
2025	Trooping the Colour	Presenter	BBC

=== Film ===
Year	Title	Role
2016	Kung Fu Panda 3	Mi (voice)
