= Chronovisor (film) =

2026 American film

- Theatrical release poster
- Directed by: Jack Auen; Kevin Walker
- Written by: Jack Auen; Kevin Walker
- Produced by: Jason Zuriff
- Starring: Anne Laure Sellier
- Cinematography: Leo Zhang
- Edited by: Jack Auen; Kevin Walker
- Music by: Gustav Holst
- Production company: Cosmic Salon Films
- Distributed by: Grasshopper Film
- Release dates: January 30, 2026 (IFFR); September 4, 2026 (United States)
- Running time: 99 minutes
- Country: United States
- Languages: English; French; German; Italian
- Box office: $138,955

Chronovisor is a 2026 American science fiction thriller film written, directed, and edited by Jack Auen and Kevin Walker in their feature directorial debut. It stars real-life professor Anne Laure Sellier as Béatrice Courte, an academic who becomes absorbed in the story of the "chronovisor," a device that the Benedictine monk Pellegrino Ernetti claimed could display images from any point in history.

The film combines its fictional narrative with authentic archival books, periodicals, audio recordings, and videotapes about Ernetti's claims, which the directors spent about six months collecting. It was shot on 16 mm film in libraries in New York City, Philadelphia, and Baltimore, and its soundtrack consists of recordings of Gustav Holst's The Planets.

Chronovisor premiered in the Bright Future section of the 55th International Film Festival Rotterdam on January 30, 2026. Grasshopper Film acquired its distribution rights in April 2026 and released it theatrically in the United States, beginning with a New York opening on September 4, 2026; it has grossed $138,955. The film garnered a generally positive critical response, with analyses focusing on its depiction of reading and research and on the boundary between historical fact and conspiracy theory. It won the Best Film Prize in the International Competition of the Jeonju International Film Festival, Best Film in the Iridiscencia section of the Guanajuato International Film Festival, and the Bronze Horse for Best Film at the Stockholm International Film Festival, and received a special mention in the New Visions competition of the Reykjavík International Film Festival.

== Plot ==
Dr. Béatrice Courte, a respected academic based in the United States, is writing a monograph on historical theories of human memory when she comes across an archived audio recording of a lecture about the "chronovisor", a device allegedly invented by Benedictine priest Pellegrino Ernetti that could reproduce images from any point in history on a television screen. Although widely dismissed as pseudoscientific, the lecturer argues that the device was based on the conservation of mass and energy, which supposedly produces "residual waves" that travel through the aether and can be reconstructed into images of the past.

Intrigued, Courte begins investigating Ernetti's work on the device, spending her evenings searching through old magazines, books, newspapers, and archival footage in libraries throughout New York City. The materials allege that Ernetti developed the chronovisor in the early 1950s in collaboration with several scientists, including Wernher von Braun and Enrico Fermi, and used it to observe historical events such as the crucifixion of Jesus Christ, episodes recounted in the Iliad, and a staging of the long-lost Roman tragedy Thyestes.

As her investigation progresses, Courte becomes increasingly obsessed with the chronovisor, to the detriment of her own academic work. She writes to Ernetti's nephew, Matteo, seeking access to his uncle's personal belongings for research purposes. Although Matteo has since died, a box of materials associated with Ernetti is delivered to her from the Monroe University campus in Castries, but apparently yields no substantial clues. Courte also contacts publishers of books by individuals associated with Ernetti, including French priest François Brune and writer Peter Krassa, under the pretense of arranging recognition for Krassa's work on parascientific literature and Ernetti's contributions to musicology. Further archival materials reveal that Ernetti, when challenged by journalists who dismissed the device as a hoax, defended his claims while maintaining that he had kept the invention secret because of the potentially dangerous consequences of its discovery and alleged threats from the Catholic Church. Some accounts claim that the device was dismantled, with its components distributed around the world to prevent its military use. One article also alludes to an unspecified "special effect" experienced due to the device. Other archival materials document Ernetti's last known appearance in Lisbon, where he was seen with unidentified individuals, before he went missing for more than a decade; he resurfaced only at his own funeral in Venice.

Courte eventually receives a lead from an Italian lawyer (referred to her by Krassa) who had handled paperwork concerning Ernetti's estate. The clue points to a location in Portugal indicated as "Pertuesa," a name Courte recognizes from the label of a damaged VHS cassette among the materials in Ernetti's box. After untangling the cassette's exposed magnetic tape and repairing it, she plays the recording which contains nighttime footage of a Portuguese village, apparently filmed by Matteo. The accompanying voice claims that Ernetti had confided in his nephew that the chronovisor had never been dismantled. Instead, it had been stolen by a Portuguese co-inventor and taken to the village, where the narrator had gone to retrieve it. The recording also reveals the device's adverse effects on its users: the memories of people observed through the chronovisor can merge with the user's own, eventually blurring their sense of identity.

Following the lead, Courte travels to the Portuguese village and enters a seemingly abandoned house. Inside, she encounters a bespectacled man repeatedly tearing pages from a book but passes him by as she explores the building. In a bedroom, she discovers the chronovisor, a large machine equipped with numerous knobs and antennae, an oscilloscope, and a television screen. After adjusting its controls, she activates the device, which displays grainy moving images accompanied by distorted voices. Among the images are scenes apparently depicting historical events, including the crucifixion and death of Jesus Christ. The display then shifts to increasingly recognizable footage of Courte, replaying events from her investigation, including her arrival at the house and discovery of the machine. The chronovisor ultimately shows a flickering image of Courte's own shocked face before the film cuts to black.

== Cast ==
=== Main ===
- Anne Laure Sellier as Béatrice Courte, an academic based in the United States who becomes obsessed with tracking down the chronovisor

=== Supporting ===
- Sophie Queuniet
- Laurence Marie
- Antonio Curedda
- Jarin van Emmichoven
- Gilles Turré
- Thrash VA
- Alex Kolodkin
- Nick Tebben
- Nicole Dombrowski Risser
- José Pacheco de Almeida

== Production ==
=== Development and research ===
Kevin Walker, who holds a master's degree in theology, encountered the chronovisor in Ambrose Andreano's book Angels, Archons & Aliens, which mentions the device in about half a page. The film's story draws on the claims of Pellegrino Ernetti, an Italian Benedictine monk who said he had helped invent a machine capable of filming the past. Walker and Jack Auen originally conceived the project as non-fiction and first pitched it as "a documentary wrapped in fiction", before combining it with a separate idea for an academic thriller. Sourcing the archival material took about six months; most of the 20 to 25 items shown in the film were bought through eBay and similar websites, and a few were borrowed from libraries. The directors have named the fiction of Jorge Luis Borges and Umberto Eco, Donna Tartt's The Secret History, and the films Seven, Zodiac, National Treasure, and Indiana Jones and the Last Crusade among their influences.

=== Casting ===
Anne Laure Sellier, a professor of behavioral sciences at HEC Paris whose research concerns time perception, creativity, and cognitive biases, plays the main character Béatrice Courte in her film debut. The filmmakers first considered trained actors, then searched the alumni databases of New York University, Columbia University, and Fordham University; they chose Sellier after watching a TED talk and a recorded lecture she had given, and Auen contacted her by email. She is also credited as an associate producer.

=== Filming ===
Leo Zhang photographed the film on 16 mm, mostly with natural or practical light; neither director had previously shot a feature on the format. According to the production notes, the format was chosen to match the analog textures of the archival material. The archival documents were filmed at a one-to-one shooting ratio to conserve film stock. Interiors were filmed in four libraries: the Yale Club in New York City, the German Society library in Philadelphia, the George Peabody Library of Johns Hopkins University in Baltimore, and the library of the Gilman School, the directors' former high school in Baltimore. The directors limited the number of actors on screen partly to save money.

English translations are superimposed over the original Italian, French, and German texts, a choice the directors attributed partly to budgetary constraints; film grain and gate weave were added to the overlaid text so that it would appear to be part of the artifacts.

=== Music and sound ===
The soundtrack consists of Gustav Holst's The Planets, which the directors used because it was free of copyright; they did not commission an original score and selected passages from four recordings of the suite. A Gregorian chant studied by Ernetti was also used for a scene in the film. Eric Zhang is credited for sound design.

== Release ==
Chronovisor had its world premiere in the Bright Future section of the 55th International Film Festival Rotterdam on January 30, 2026. In April 2026, Grasshopper Film acquired its distribution rights. It screened at New Directors/New Films Festival on April 10, 2026, the Los Angeles Festival of Movies on April 12, and the 27th Jeonju International Film Festival in May. Later festival screenings included the Reykjavík International Film Festival, the BFI London Film Festival, the Festival du nouveau cinéma in Montreal, the Film Forward International Competition of the Thessaloniki International Film Festival, the Stockholm International Film Festival, and the Before Midnight section of the QCinema International Film Festival.

Grasshopper Film opened the film at Film at Lincoln Center in New York on September 4, 2026, where it was presented alongside the venue's Bibliomania film series; it had screened at the American Cinematheque in Los Angeles on August 30. The distributor scheduled engagements at more than 60 venues in the United States and Canada through December 2026. The film has grossed $138,955 at the domestic box office.

== Reception ==
=== Critical response ===
On the review aggregator website Rotten Tomatoes, 97% of 30 critics' reviews are positive. The website's critics consensus calls the film "an eerie, wildly imaginative work of speculative sci-fi" and describes it as a meditation on the obsession with images and recorded experience. Metacritic, which uses a weighted average, assigned the film a score of 89 out of 100, based on 12 critics, indicating "universal acclaim".

Jeff Reichert of Reverse Shot wrote that from sparse elements the filmmakers had made "one of the most intellectually expansive and legitimately thrilling movie mysteries in recent memory". Brandon Yu of The New York Times called it "a bewitchingly lo-fi thriller" whose amber-toned images resemble a relic from decades past. Katie Rife of Inverse found the film gripping throughout and singled out its graphic design and its use of Holst's music, and Coleman Spilde of Salon called it a masterpiece while cautioning that viewers must work to get the most from it.

Some reviews were more qualified. Jacob Oller of The A.V. Club gave the film a B+, praising its visual rendering of the act of thinking but finding it more repetitive than a conventional thriller and Béatrice's devotion to knowledge "a little alienating". Carmen Gray of The Film Verdict praised the 16 mm photography and the finale, but considered the suspense more cerebral than visceral and doubted that the film would find wide appeal beyond arthouse audiences. Juan Barquin of RogerEbert.com admired how the film presents information and praised its score, but found the ending predictable and its depiction of Béatrice's descent into madness overly literal.

== Themes and interpretations ==
Reichert, Oller, and Spilde focus on the film's treatment of reading and research. Reichert argues that the film, composed largely of shots of Béatrice reading intercut with close-ups of the texts she examines, takes on-screen text to an extreme and casts its viewers as detectives who assemble textual clues. Oller similarly writes that the film succeeds in depicting the process of thinking rather than writing, compiling excerpts of reports, articles, and phone calls into a collage that resembles a hypertext. Spilde reads the film as presenting academic research as a means of access to the past, present, and future, and as a test of the audience's attention. Kevin Walker and Jack Auen have described Béatrice's isolated research as both a form of high adventure and a potentially pathological way of life, and have said they deliberately omitted her backstory.

Dylan Adamson of The Brooklyn Rail describes the film as a docu-fiction hybrid situated between The Da Vinci Code and La Jetée, more interested in the temptations and hazards of conspiratorial thinking than in conspiracy pulp; he argues that the apparent completeness of the archive does not make the past more reliable, since "one sees what one wants to see". Gray interprets the film as a parable for an era of disputed facts, conspiracy theories, and virtual spaces that absorb personal identity, and connects it to anxieties about artificial intelligence and the erosion of privacy. Walker has compared the verification of historical events to "an act of faith", and the directors have characterized the film as a fable rather than a biography of Ernetti.

Reichert and Oller also discuss memory and recorded media. Reichert links Béatrice's scholarship on memory palaces to the idea of a world that preserves everything that has happened, while Oller argues that the film shows how writings and recordings leave behind a multimedia double of a person. Gray identifies the protagonist's academic seclusion and the acquisitive nature of elite knowledge-seeking as the conditions from which the film's dread develops, and Dustin Chang of ScreenAnarchy concludes that the film is ultimately concerned with the desire to uncover knowledge that has been withheld. Reichert suggests that Béatrice's turn toward the chronovisor may reflect dissatisfaction with academic life.

Becca Rothfeld of The New Yorker, Gray, Barquin, and Chang each discuss the film in terms of horror. Rothfeld argues that the directors found in horror the ideal genre for depicting "the pangs of thinking", likening the fear that intellectual pursuit is empty to the fear of a haunting. Gray calls it "techno-horror" and compares its ending to The Blair Witch Project, and Barquin likens it to cosmic horror in its depiction of an irresistible quest that leads toward destruction. Chang writes that the film enters horror territory only at its conclusion, and that its degraded images of figures and faces are unsettling without matching the effects of Ring or found-footage horror. Other critics frame the film differently: Spilde writes that only two works of analog horror, Cecelia Condit's Possibly in Michigan and John Carpenter's Prince of Darkness, had chilled him as much, yet maintains that the film's images do not read like those of a horror film, Rife classifies it as a mystery-thriller hybrid, and Reichert places it in a lineage of occult-adjacent mysteries such as Umberto Eco's The Name of the Rose and Roman Polanski's The Ninth Gate.

== Accolades ==
Award / Festival	Date	Category	Recipient(s)	Result	Ref.
Jeonju International Film Festival	May 7, 2026	Best Film Prize (International Competition)	Jack Auen and Kevin Walker	Won	
Guanajuato International Film Festival	August 1, 2026	Best Film (Iridiscencia Official Selection)	Jack Auen and Kevin Walker	Won	
Reykjavík International Film Festival	October 2026	New Visions – Special Mention	Jack Auen and Kevin Walker	Won	
Stockholm International Film Festival	November 19, 2026	Bronze Horse for Best Film	Jack Auen and Kevin Walker	Won	
