= Thyestes (disambiguation) =

Thyestes was the mythical king of Olympia.

Thyestes may also refer to:

- Thyestes (Euripides), a lost Greek tragedy by Euripides
- Thyestes (Ennius), a lost Latin tragedy by Ennius
- Thyestes (Seneca), a Latin tragedy by Seneca
- Mount Thyestes, in Canada
- Thyestes (fish), a genus of fossil fish
- 14792 Thyestes, an asteroid

== See also ==
- Thyestes Chase, a National Hunt handicap steeplechase run in Ireland
