= 55th International Film Festival Rotterdam =

2026 edition of IFFR

- Promotional poster
- Opening film: Providence and the Guitar by João Nicolau
- Closing film: Bazaar by Rémi Bezançon
- Location: Rotterdam, Netherlands
- Founded: 1972
- Awards: Tiger Award: Variations on a Theme!; Audience Award: I Swear; Robby Müller Award: Yorick Le Saux
- Artistic director: Vanja Kaludjercic
- Festival date: Opening: 29 January 2026; Closing: 8 February 2026
- Website: IFFR

International Film Festival Rotterdam
- 2027 2025

The 55th International Film Festival Rotterdam, is the 2026 edition of the International Film Festival Rotterdam, which was held from 29 January to 8 February 2026. In this edition a retrospective for Egyptian film director Marwan Hamed, as one of its Focus strands in celebration of his prolific career was featured along with European premiere of his 2025 film El Sett, a biopic of Egyptian singer and actress Umm Kulthum. In its second focus strand the festival will present films from the Japanese V-Cinema.

The festival closed with the premiere of French film Bazaar, a comedy-thriller about a crime writer and a film professor caught up in a mystery by Rémi Bezançon. Tiger Award was won by Variations on a Theme!, by Jason Jacobs and Devon Delmar, whereas Audience Award was won by British biographical drama film I Swear by Kirk Jones.

== Jury ==
The jury for its three competition sections was announced on 2 December 2025.

=== Tiger Competition ===
- Soheila Golestani, Iranian actress and film director
- Marcelo Gomes, Brazilian film director, screenwriter and visual artist.
- Ariane Labed, Greek-French actress and film director.
- Kristy Matheson, BFI London Film Festival Director since 2023, and formerly the Creative Director of the Edinburgh International Film Festival and Director of Film at Australia’s national museum of screen culture ACMI.
- Jurica Pavičić, Croatian writer, columnist and film critic

=== Tiger Short Competition ===
- Sammy Baloji: photographer from the Democratic Republic of the Congo
- Anka Gujabidze: visual artist from Tbilisi
- Jukka-Pekka Laakso: Festival director of Tampere Film Festival since 2002

=== Big Screen Competition ===
- Jan-Willem van Ewijk: Dutch film director, actor and screenwriter
- Sara Ishaq: Yemeni-Scottish film director, screenwriter, and trainer
- Loes Luca: Dutch actress, singer and comedian
- Chris Oosterom: Director of Imagine Film Festival
- Mila Schlingemann: Senior Programmer & Acquisitions at EYE, the national museum for film and the art of moving image in the Netherlands.

== Official selection ==
The titles were revealed on 16 December 2025.

=== Opening and closing films ===
The opening and closing films of the festival are:

English title	Original title	Director(s)	Production countrie(s)
Opening film
Providence and the Guitar	A Providência e a Guitarra	João Nicolau	Portugal
Closing film
Bazaar	Le crime du 3e étage	Rémi Bezançon	France

=== Tiger Competition ===
The competition titles are as follows:

- La belle année, Angelica Ruffier (Sweden, Norway)
- A Fading Man, Welf Reinhart (Germany)
- The Gymnast, Charlotte Glynn (United States)
- A Messy Tribute to Motherly Love, Dan Geesin (Netherlands, Germany, Belgium)
- My Semba, Hugo Salvaterra (Angola)
- Nangong Cheng, Shao Pan (China)
- O profeta, Ique Langa (Mozambique, South Africa, Qatar)
- Roid, Mejbaur Rahman Sumon, (Bangladesh)
- Supporting Role, Ana Urushadze (Georgia, Estonia, Turkey, Switzerland, United States)
- Unerasable!, Socrates Saint-Wulfstan Drakos (Belgium, Thailand, Sweden)
- Variations on a Theme, Jason Jacobs, Devon Delmar (South Africa, Netherlands, Qatar)
- Yellow Cake, Tiago Melo (Brazil)

=== Big Screen Competition ===
- 2m^{2}, Volkan Üce, Belgium, Germany, Turkey
- The Arab, Malek Bensmaïl, Algeria, France, Switzerland, United Arab Emirates, Belgium
- Butterfly, Itonje Søimer Guttormsen, Norway, Sweden, United Kingdom, Germany
- Cyclone, Philip Yung, Hong Kong
- The Fall of Sir Douglas Weatherford, Sean Dunn, United Kingdom
- Home, Marijana Janković, Denmark, Serbia
- Master, Rezwan Shahriar Sumit, Bangladeshis
- Moonglow, Isabel Sandoval, Philippines
- Now I Met Her, Xiao Luxi, China
- Projecto Global, Ivo M. Ferreira, Portugal, Luxembourg
- Talking to a Stranger (Hablando con extraños), Adrian Garcia Bogliano, Mexico
- Tell Me What You Feel, Łukasz Ronduda, Poland

=== Tiger Short Competition ===
- A donde nos lleva la fe de José Gerónimo, director Juliano Kunert (Dominican Republic)
- Acid City, dir. Jack Wedge, Will Freudenheim (United States)
- The Apple Doesn’t Fall..., dir. Dean Wei (China)
- Body, remember..., dir. Matthew Berka (United Kingdom)
- CUL-DE-SAC !, dir. Clyde Gates, Gabriel Sanson (Belgium, France)
- Deep Cobalt, dir. Petna Ndaliko Katondolo (Congo, Democratic Republic, United States)
- DISSONANCE, dir. Jordan Strafer (Germany)
- Domestic Demon, dir. Anahid Yahjian (United States, Portugal)
- Futuros luminosos, dir. Ismael García Ramírez (Colombia)
- Golden Island, dir. Arief Budiman (Indonesia, Singapore)
- Home Is where the heart Is, dir. Timothée Engasser (France)
- I am a River, dir. Heidi Piiroinen (Finland, France)
- Last Shot, dir. Parham Rahimzadeh (Netherlands)
- like moths to light, dir. Gala Hernández López (Spain, Italy, France)
- Mirror Martyr Mirror Moon, dir. Jesse Jones (Ireland)
- The Next World, dir. Grau Del Grau (United States)
- Objet d’énigme, dir. Chiara Caterina (Italy, Belgium)
- Orla, dir. Marie Lukáčová (Czech Republic, Slovakia)
- RELUCESCO, dir. Shannon Lynn Harris (Canada)
- The Second Skin, dir. Mariia Lapidus (United States, Mexico)
- Smriti~, dir. Shahi A J (India)
- The Tragic Movement of the Spheres, dir. Simon Rieth (France)

=== Limelight ===
A programme showcasing cinematic highlights of film festival favourites and international award-winners.

English title	Original title	Director(s)	Production countrie(s)
100 Nights of Hero		Julia Jackman	United Kingdom, United States
3 Days in September	3 zile în septembrie	Tudor Giurgiu	Romania
Badak		M. Raihan Halim	Singapore, Malaysia
Bazaar (Murder in the Building)	Le crime du 3e étage	Rémi Bezançon	France
Between Brothers	Tussen broers	Tom Fassaert	Netherlands, Belgium
ChaO	チャオ	Yasuhiro Aoki	Japan
Dead Man's Wire		Gus Van Sant	United States
Deadline	自殺通告	Kiwi Chow	Taiwan, Hong Kong, United Kingdom
El Sett		Marwan Hamed	Egypt
Exit 8	8番出口	Genki Kawamura	Japan
Fackham Hall		Jim O'Hanlon	United Kingdom, United States
Father Mother Sister Brother		Jim Jarmusch	United States, Ireland, France
Fuori		Mario Martone	Italy, France
Gavagai		Ulrich Köhler	Germany, France
The History of Sound		Oliver Hermanus	United Kingdom, United States
Hi-Five	하이파이브	Kang Hyeong-cheol	South Korea
I Swear		Kirk Jones	United Kingdom
The Kidnapping of a President	Kyyditys	Samuli Valkama	Finland, Czech Republic, Netherlands, Estonia
Late Fame		Kent Jones	United States
Life Is Life	La vita va così	Riccardo Milani	Italy
The Little Sister	La Petite Dernière	Hafsia Herzi	France, Germany
Mi Amor		Guillaume Nicloux	France
My Daughter Is a Zombie	좀비딸	Pil Gam-sung	South Korea
My Tennis Maestro	Il Maestro	Andrea Di Stefano	Italy
No Hit Wonder		Florian Dietrich	Germany
No Other Choice	어쩔수가없다	Park Chan-wook	South Korea
Palestine 36	فلسطين ٣٦	Annemarie Jacir	Palestine, United Kingdom, France, Denmark, Norway, Qatar, Saudi Arabia, Jordan
Parasakthi	பராசக்தி	Sudha Kongara	India
Peleliu: Guernica of Paradise	ペリリュー 楽園のゲルニカ	Goro Kuji	Japan
Providence and the Guitar	A providência e a guitarra	João Nicolau	Portugal
Quezon		Jerrold Tarog	Philippines
Rangga & Cinta		Riri Riza	Indonesia
Return to Silent Hill		Christophe Gans	France, United States
Romería		Carla Simón	Spain, Germany
Scarlet	果てしなきスカーレット	Mamoru Hosoda	Japan
The Secret Agent	O Agente Secreto	Kleber Mendonça Filho	Brazil, France, Germany, Netherlands
The Shadow's Edge	捕风追影	Larry Yang	China, Hong Kong
Siapa Dia		Garin Nugroho	Indonesia
Silent Friend	Stille Freundin	Ildikó Enyedi	Germany, France, Hungary
Sore: Wife from the Future	Sore: Istri dari Masa Depan	Yandy Laurens	Indonesia
Sound of Falling	In die Sonne schauen	Mascha Schilinski	Germany
Special Unit – The First Murder	Rejseholdet – Det første mord	Christoffer Boe	Denmark, Poland
The Stranger	L'Étranger	François Ozon	France
The Testament of Ann Lee		Mona Fastvold	United Kingdom, United States
Tokyo Taxi	TOKYOタクシー	Yoji Yamada	Japan
Treat Her Like a Lady		Paloma Aguilera Valdebenito	Netherlands
Tunnels: Sun In The Dark	Địa đạo: Mặt trời trong bóng tối	Bui Thac Chuyen	Vietnam
Two Prosecutors	Два прокурора	Sergei Loznitsa	Latvia, France, Germany, Netherlands, Romania, Lithuania
Whitetail		Nanouk Leopold	Netherlands, Belgium, Ireland
The Wizard of the Kremlin	Le mage du Kremlin	Olivier Assayas	France
The Wolf, the Fox & the Leopard		David Verbeek	Netherlands, Luxembourg, Ireland, Taiwan, Croatia, Belgium, Finland

=== Bright Future ===
The programme highlights first-feature films from promising filmmakers.

English title	Original title	Director(s)	Production countrie(s)
Ah Girl	阿 Girl	Ang Geck Geck Priscilla	Singapore
Chronovisor		Jack Auen & Kevin Walker	United States
Dead Dogs Don't Bite	Ölü Köpekler Isırmaz	Nuri Cihan Özdoğan	Turkiye
Honey Bunny	Koke	Igor Jelinović	Croatia, Serbia
I Grew an Inch When My Father Died		P. R. Monencillo Patindol	Philippines
Let Them Be Seen		Nolitha Refilwe Mkulisi	South Africa, Germany
Mayilaa		Semmalar Annam	India

=== Harbour ===
The programme showcases contemporary cinema.

English title	Original title	Director(s)	Production countrie(s)
58th		Carl Joseph Papa	Philippines
Accept Our Sincere Apologies		Juja Dobrachkous	United Kingdom, Italy
Art Is Dark and Full of Horrors	El arte es oscuro y está lleno de horrores	Artemio Narro	Mexico
Earth Song		Erol Mintaş	Finland, Germany
The Hole, 309 Days to the Bloodiest Tragedy	Lobang Buaya: 309 Hari Sebelum Tragedi Berdarah	Hanung Bramantyo	Indonesia
Gaua		Paul Urkijo	Spain
Krakatoa		Carlos Casas	United Kingdom, Poland, France
The Misconceived		James N. Kienitz Wilkins	United States
Motherwitch	Δωδεκάμερον	Minos Papas	Cyprus, North Macedonia, United States
The Passion According to GHB	A Paixão Segundo GHB	Gustavo Vinagre, Vinicius Couto	Brazil
A Useful Ghost	ผีใช้ได้ค่ะ	Ratchapoom Boonbunchachoke	Thailand, France, Singapore, Germany

=== Focus: Marwan Hamed ===
This will feature Marwan Hamed's work from the past twenty years.

Year	English title	Original title	Production countrie(s)
2014	The Blue Elephant	الفيل الأزرق	Egypt
2019	The Blue Elephant 2	2 الفيل الأزرق	Egypt
2018	Diamond Dust	تُراب الماس	Egypt
2009	Ibrahim Labyad	إبراهيم الأبيض	Egypt
2022	Kira & El Gin	الجن و كيرة	Egypt
2017	The Originals	الأصليي	Egypt
2006	The Yacoubian Building	يعقوبيان عمارة	Egypt

=== Focus: V-cinema ===
Japan’s V-Cinema Focus will showcase a range of Toei titles:

English title	Original title	Director(s)	Production countrie(s)
Crime Hunter	クライムハンター 怒りの銃弾	Okawa Toshimichi	Japan

== Awards ==
The following awards were given in the festival:

=== Tiger Award ===
- Variations on a Theme!, Jason Jacobs and Devon Delmar, South Africa, Netherlands, Qatar

Special Jury Awards

- La belle année, Angelica Ruffier, Sweden, Norway
- Supporting Role Ana Urushadze, Georgia, Estonia, Turkey, Switzerland, United States

=== Big Screen award ===
- Master, Rezwan Shahriar Sumit, Bangladesh

=== Audience Award ===
- I Swear by Kirk Jones, United Kingdom

=== Ammodo Tiger short awards ===
- The Second Skin, Mariia Lapidus, USA, Mexico
- The Apple Doesn’t Fall... Dean Wei, China
- Ndjimu (Deep Cobalt), Petna Ndaliko Katondolo, Democratic Republic of the Congo, USA

=== FIPRESCI Award ===
- Supporting Role Ana Urushadze, Georgia, Estonia, Turkey, Switzerland, United States

=== KNF Award 2026 ===
- The Apple Doesn’t Fall... Dean Wei, China

=== NETPAC Award ===
- i grew an inch when my father died P. R. Monencillo Patindol, Philippines

Special mention

- The Seoul Guardians, Kim Jong-Woo, Kim Shin-Wan and Cho Chul-Young, South Korea

=== Youth Jury Award ===
- Ah Girl, Ang Geck Geck Priscilla, Singapore

=== European Short Film Award Nomination ===
- CUL-DE-SAC !, Clyde Gates, Gabriel Sanson, Belgium, France

=== Robby Müller Award ===
- Yorick Le Saux, French cinematographer
