= Gymnast (disambiguation) =

A gymnast is an athlete in gymnastics.

- Gymnast may also refer to:
- "The Gymnast" (Seinfeld), a 1994 episode
- The Gymnast (2006 film), directed by Ned Farr
- The Gymnast (2026 film), directed by Charlotte Glynn
- "Gymnast", a song by Gucci Mane from I'm Up, 2012
