= Rein Kotov =

Estonian film operator

Rein Kotov (born 17 February 1965 in Raasiku, Harju County) is an Estonian film operator and film editor.

In 1991 he graduated from Gerasimov Institute of Cinematography.

1985-1993 he worked at Tallinnfilm. After that he is worked primarily for Allfilm.

In 2014 he was awarded with Order of the White Star, IV class.

== Filmography ==
- 1993 "Darkness in Tallinn" (cinematographer)
- 2015 "1944" (feature film; operator)
- 2015 "Tiibadeta piloot" (feature film; operator)
- 2016 "Luuraja ja luuletaja" (feature film; operator)
- 2018 "Seltsimees laps" (feature film; operator)
- 2019 "Tõde ja õigus" (feature film; operator)
- 2022 Burial (cinematographer)
- 2026 Supporting Role (cinematographer)
- 2026 Our Erika (cinematographer)
