= Helmut Schmidt (parapsychologist) =

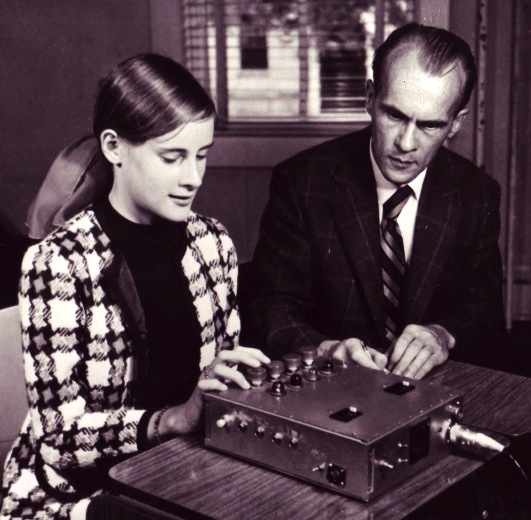
- Schmidt and subject in a random number generator experiment
- Born: 21 February 1928
- Died: 18 August 2011 (aged 83)
- Occupation(s): Physicist, parapsychologist

Helmut Schmidt (21 February 1928 – 18 August 2011) was a German-born physicist and parapsychologist whose experiments on extrasensory perception were widely criticized for machine bias, methodological errors and lack of replication. Critics also noted that necessary precautions were not taken to rule out the possibility of fraud.

== Biography ==
Schmidt was born in Danzig, Germany. He was educated at the University of Göttingen (M.A., 1953) and obtained a Ph.D. in physics from University of Cologne in 1958. He taught theoretical physics at universities in America, Germany and Canada.

In the 1960s Schmidt carried out experiments into clairvoyance and precognition. In the early 1970s he pioneered research into the effects of human consciousness on machines called random number generators or random event generators at the Rhine Research Center Institute for Parapsychology. He was appointed Research Director of the Institute in 1969.

Schmidt initially conducted experiments with electronic random event generators of either a flashing red or green light. Subjects would attempt to make one illuminate more than the other by psychic means. Schmidt reported success rates of 1–2% above what would be expected at random over a large number of trials. He has been credited by critics of parapsychology as the researcher with the most sophisticated approach to the methodological design of parapsychological experiments.

== Reception ==
Critics have written Schmidt's experiments in parapsychology have not been replicated. Schmidt worked alone with no one checking his experiments. He was accused of being a careless experimenter.

The psychologist C. E. M. Hansel found flaws in all of Schmidt's experiments into clairvoyance, precognition and psychokinesis. Hansel found that necessary precautions were not taken, there was no presence of an observer or second-experimenter in any of the experiments, no counterchecking of the records and no separate machines used for high and low score attempts. There were weaknesses in the design of the experiments that did not rule out the possibility of trickery. There was little control of the experimenter and unsatisfactory features of the machine employed. Regarding the machine used in the experiments, Hansel wrote:

The most obvious weakness in Schmidt's machine is that the results are in no case recorded positively inside the machine. They are only revealed after processing data obtained from the resettable counters in the machine or from the paper punch connected it. While machines may be foolproof, human beings seldom are... If Schmidt had used two machines, his scores for high- and low-aiming runs could have been kept separate from the start. Nonresettable counters could have ensured that all attempts were recorded and some supervision of the use and recording of the counters would have instilled more confidence into readers of the reports than they are likely to have at present.

The psychologists Leonard Zusne, Warren H. Jones supported Hansel and also noted:

The effect obtained by Schmidt and others is very small, at most a 2% deviation from the 50% chance level. Because of the very large number of trials that can be run with the REG in a short period of time (each trial lasts only a second or less), the odds against even such minuscule deviations range from 100 to 1 to several billions to 1. When, in addition to assessing the statistical significance of the results, their clinical or practical significance is also assessed using the appropriate statistics, it turns out to be practically zero... It can be assumed that the smaller the absolute size of a measured effect, the greater the likelihood that the effect is due to some extraneous, uncontrolled variable. In the REG experiments, statistical significance of the results is achieved only against a background of a very large number of trials, and the practical significance of the results is concomitantly zero. It can be, therefore, also assumed that such results are probably the outcome of one or more uncontrolled variable.

According to the physicist Victor Stenger "While Schmidt claims positive results, his experiments also lack adequate statistical significance and have not been successfully replicated in the thirty-five years since his first experiments were reported."

The psychologist James Alcock wrote that he found "serious methodological errors" throughout Schmidt's work which rendered his conclusions of psychokinesis untenable. This included criticism of Schmidt acting both as experimenter and subject and lack of clarification and detail from his reports such as the possibility of optional stopping during the experiments.

Schmidt has also drawn criticism for endorsing the psychic claims of Uri Geller.

== See also ==
- Extrasensory perception
- Remy Chauvin
