= Remy Chauvin =

French biologist and entomologist

March 26, 1994: Father François Brune & Professor Rémy Chauvin, having a lunch, during the first international congress dedicated to the so-called instrumental transcommunication — also known as electronic voice phenomenon — held in Versailles, France, on March 26 & 27, 1994.

Remy Chauvin (10 October 1913 – 8 December 2009) at Sainte-Croix-aux-Mines, Haut-Rhin, was a biologist and entomologist, and a French Honorary Professor Emeritus at the Sorbonne, PhD, and a senior research fellow since 1946. Chauvin was also known for defending the rights of animals and for being interested in such topics as parapsychology, life after death, psychics, clairvoyance and UFOs. He sometimes wrote under the pseudonym Pierre Duval.

== Evolution ==
Chauvin, continuing a tradition defended by French scientists Pierre-Paul Grassé and Jean Piveteau, was very critical of Darwinism and sociobiology. He developed his own evolutionary theory which was described in three books (God of the ants, God of the stars; The Biology of the Spirit; Darwinism or the death of a myth)

Chauvin's view of evolution can be seen as directed, goal driven and non-random. He has been described as a non-darwinian evolutionist. The following is a summary of his evolutionary views:

- Neo-Darwinism is a set of tautologies (e.g. natural selection predicts the survival of the fittest. But who is the fittest? Whoever survives!).
- Life is characterized by an immense adaptability to extensive changes in environments.
- The narrowness of the adaptation is death (e.g. a panda eats only bamboo).
- Alongside a complicated device, you can often find one nearby that is simpler and apparently works as well.
- Evolution looks at the goal and not the means.
- The environment is selective in only a very small number of cases.
- Evolution is directed. It is an internal program that runs and does not return. The goal seems to be the highest possible psyche.

Similar to the parapsychologist Helmut Schmidt Chauvin developed some of his views from his experiments in Anpsi (animal psi). He did experiments with rats and his results indicated that the rats could have been using Extrasensory perception.

Chauvin has been the subject of much criticism from others because it would appear his views of evolution have a vitalist leaning. He was also accused by his critics of wanting to strengthen creationism, although Chauvin was not a creationist.

Chauvin wrote a number of books on parapsychology that were similar to books by the authors Jacques Bergier and Louis Pauwels.

== Published works by Chauvin ==
Most of Chauvin's works have been published in French. The translations into English are listed here:

- The life of the insect and physiology, ed. Lechevalier, 1941, repr. 1983
- What you should know about the life of the insect physiology and biology, ed. Lechevalier, 1943
- Treaty of Insect Physiology: the major functions, behavior, environmental physiology, ed. INRA, 1949, repr. 1958
- Five years of operation of the station Bee Research Bures-sur-Yvette, ed. INRA, 1954
- Life and habits of insects, ed. Payot, 1956
- Bee biology. General review until 1956, ed. INRA, vol. 1, 1958
- God of scholars, the experience of God, ed. Mame, 1958
- Social behavior in animals, ed. PUF, 1961
- Animal societies, from bee to gorilla, ed. Plon, 1963
- Fighting techniques in animals, ed. Hachette, coll. The Adventure of Life, 1965
- Our unknown powers (under the pseudonym Pierre Duval, Jacques + Bergier), ed. Planet (Planet Encyclopedia coll.), 1966, repr. CGR (and revised), 1997
- The world of insects, ed. Hachette, 1967
- Behavior (+ Canestrelli L.), ed. Masson, 1968, ed. PUF, 1968
- The world of ants, ed. Plon, 1969, repr. du Rocher 1994, supplemented
- Science to the strange (under the pseudonym Pierre Duval), ed. Club of Friends of the Book (CAL – al. Library of irrationality and of the great mysteries), 1973
- Attachment (+ Anzieu D.), ed. Oxford University Press, 1974
- Ethology, biological study of animal behavior, ed. PUF, 1975
- Gifted, ed. Stock, 1975 repr. Marabout, 1979
- From the heart, ed. Retz, 1976
- Some things I do not understand, ed. CELT, 1976, repr. Famot, 1982 (revised edition of "Science at the strange")
- The bees and I, ed. Hachette, 1976
- The animal world and its complex behaviors (+ Bernadette Chauvin), ed. Plon, 1977
- The challenges of future war, ed. France-Empire, 1978
- Ants and Men, ed. France-Empire, 1979
- The synod of the faithful, ed. Vernoy, 1979
- Secrets of portolans (maps of the unknown), ed. France-Empire, 1980
- Parapsychology. When the irrational joined Science, ed. Hachette, 1980
- Scholars, for what?, Ed. Payot, 1981
- Plot in our church, ed. du Rocher, 1981 (idem "The Synod of the faithful", less the introduction, plus an afterword and a conclusion)
- The animal model (+ Bernadette Chauvin), ed. Hachette, 1982
- Animal societies, ed. PUF, 1982, repr. Quadriga / PUF, 1999
- Travel Overseas Land, ed. du Rocher, 1983
- The watchmen of the time, ed. du Rocher, 1984
- Animal societies and human societies, 1984, PUF, coll. " What do I know? "No. 696 (note: QSJ with same title and same number, by Paul Chauchard)
- The biology of mind, ed. du Rocher, 1985
- The hive and man, ed. Calmann-Lévy, 1987
- God of the ants, the god of the stars, ed. The Pre Clerics, 1988
- The direction of life and the genesis of thought, ed. François-Xavier de Guibert, 1989, repr. EYE 1998
- Animals and men, ed. Seghers, 1989
- The animal instinct, ed. Contrasts / The zeitgeist, 1990 (first part of Charles Darwin, 1884)
- A strange passion, a life for insects, ed. The Pre Clerics, 1990
- Psychological function, ed. Robert Laffont, 1991
- The conquerors blind, science threatens us does?, Ed. Robert Laffont, 1992
- The new Golem, ed. du Rocher, 1993
- Live from the afterlife (in collaboration with Father Francis Brown ), ed. Robert Laffont, 1993
- The world of ants, ed. du Rocher, 1994
- God's future, about a man of science, ed. du Rocher, 1995
- Bird World, ed. the Rock 1996
- Darwinism or the end of a myth, al. "The Spirit and Matter", ed. du Rocher, 1997
- Handbook of Psychophysiology, ed. Masson, 1997
- Listening to the beyond (+ father F. Brown), ed. Lebeaud, 1999 (fitness "Live from the Beyond")
- The devil in the font, ed. du Rocher, 1999
- The riddle of the bees, ed. du Rocher, 1999
- The man, monkey and bird, ed. Odile Jacob, 2000
- The paranormal in the Third Millennium, ed. JM Laffont – LPM, 2001
- The ball of bees, Volume 1, ed. of Goral, 2001 (Cartoon, RC scenario, drawings by Patrice Serres
- The return of the magicians, the alarm of a scientist, ed. JMG, 2002
- The ball of bees, Volume 2 "The fragrance of coffee," ed. of Goral, 2002 (planned trilogy)

== See also ==
- Richard Milton
- Extrasensory perception
- Telepathy
- Paranormal
- Vitalism
