= Cotter Smith =

American actor (born 1949)

- Born: Joseph Cotter Smith; May 29, 1949 (age 77); Washington, D.C., U.S.
- Occupation: Actor
- Years active: 1982–present
- Spouses: Christina Egloff (m. 1972; div. 1980); Mel Harris (m. 1988; div. 1996); Heidi Mueller (m. 2001)
- Father: John Lewis Smith Jr.

Joseph Cotter Smith (born May 29, 1949) is an American stage, film, and television actor.

== Early life ==
He was born in Washington, D.C., the son of Madeline (née Cotter) and John Lewis Smith, Jr., who was a federal judge. He graduated from the Lawrenceville School in 1968. In 1972, he received his Bachelor of Arts degree in literature at Trinity College, Hartford, Connecticut.

Smith's grandfather was an attorney, as are his brother and sister, and he said, "It was sort of assumed that I would be a lawyer, too." Instead, when he finished college, he became a teacher. After a few years, however, his interest turned to acting.

== Career ==
He began his acting career in New York City in 1978, studying with Stella Adler and at the Actors Studio. His New York theater credits include the Broadway premiere productions of Next Fall, which was a 2010 Tony Award nominee for Best New Play, Wendy Wasserstein's An American Daughter) and Lanford Wilson's Burn This. He also co-starred with Judd Hirsch in the National Tour of the Tony Award-winning play Art. His numerous Off Broadway appearances include the Public Theater's Shakespeare in the Park production of The Tempest with Sam Waterston; Paula Vogel's Pulitzer Prize-winning How I Learned to Drive with Molly Ringwald; Charles Fuller's Pulitzer Prize-winning A Soldier's Play with Denzel Washington and Samuel L. Jackson; Michael Weller's Side Effects with Joely Richardson; Athol Fugard's The Blood Knot with Danny Glover; Horton Foote's The Old Friends with Betty Buckley; and the American Premiere of the Olivier Award-winning Cockfight Play, among many others. He was also a ten-year member of the Circle Repertory Company in New York working exclusively on the premiere productions of new American plays.

He is a co-founder of The Matrix Theatre Company in Los Angeles, where he has appeared in The Seagull, The Homecoming, Endgame, Mad Forest, and Habeas Corpus. Other Los Angeles performances include Romeo and Juliet, Love Letters, and Raft of the Medusa, as well as the West Coast premieres of "A Soldier's Play' and How I Learned to Drive at the Mark Taper Forum.

With his wife, Heidi Mueller Smith, he co-founded and served as Artistic Director of the Cornerstone Theatre Company in Milwaukee, Wisconsin from 2001 to 2007. Among his directing credits for the company are Edward Albee's The American Dream, Harold Pinter's Night School, and Lanford Wilson's The Gingham Dog. His acting credits for the company include 12 Angry Men, Betrayal, Long Day's Journey into Night, and Educating Rita.

Smith has been nominated four times by the Los Angeles Drama Critics Circle, receiving the Outstanding Performance Award in 1996 for George M. Cohan's "The Tavern". He has received four Drama-Logue Awards and two Ovation Award nominations.

His television and film work ranges from his debut co-starring as Robert Kennedy (opposite Robert Blake's Jimmy Hoffa) in the mini-series Blood Feud, to his role as the President of the United States in the 20th Century Fox film, X2: X-Men United. Over the years he has appeared in many television shows, from his regular roles on the ABC series Equal Justice and Night Stalker to his more recent appearances on The Americans, Madam Secretary, Person of Interest, Forever, and The Good Wife.

Smith is also an acting teacher, for the past six years at The New School for Drama in New York, where he also served as the Department Head of the MFA Acting Program from 2015 to 2017. Prior to that he taught for several years at the Stella Adler Studio of Acting.

== Personal life ==
Smith has been married to Heidi Mueller Smith since 2001. He was previously married to actress Mel Harris, with whom he has his only child.

== Filmography ==
Film
Year	Film	Role	Other notes
1984	Nickel Mountain	Tucker	
1987	Lady Beware	Mac Odell	
1988	Cameron's Closet	Sergeant Sam Taliaferro	
1989	K-9	Gilliam	
1996	Invader	Dr. Case Montgomery	Alternative title: Lifeform
2003	Reeseville	John Meyers	
2003	X2	President McKenna	
2005	The Sleeper	Dr. Altman	
2008	Lunatics, Lovers & Poets	Scotty MacGregor	
2011	Friends with Kids	Phil Fryman	
2013	Burning Blue	Admiral Lynch	
2017	The Post	William Macomber	
2024	Unsinkable	Senator William Smith	
2026	The Gymnast	Dr. Sherman	
Television
Year	Title	Role	Notes
1982	St. Elsewhere	Dr. Rowe	1 episode
1982	Hill Street Blues	Intern	1 episode
1983	Blood Feud	Robert F. Kennedy	Television movie
1984	Mistral's Daughter	Frank	Miniseries
1984	The Master	Chad Webster	1 episode
1984	Cagney & Lacey	Captain Fuller	1 episode
1985	A Bunny's Tale	Ned Holcomb	Television movie
1985	Moonlighting	Brian Baker	1 episode
1985	The Rape of Richard Beck	Lt. Hugo	Television movie
1985	Hardcastle and McCormick	Randy Hopke	1 episode
1986	The Twilight Zone	Mitchell Chaplin	1 episode
1986	Murder, She Wrote	Robert Rhine	1 episode
1986	D.C. Cops	Michael Halsey	Television movie
1990	Equal Justice	Deputy D.A. Eugene "Gene" Rogan	Television movie
1990-1991	Equal Justice	Deputy D.A. Eugene "Gene" Rogan	25 episodes
1991	The Last Prostitute	Joe	Television movie
1992	Midnight's Child		Television movie
1992	A Message from Holly		Television movie
1993	A Place to Be Loved	Mike Caldwell	Television movie
1993	With Hostile Intent	Officer Rob Arnold	Television movie
1993	L.A. Law	Tony Henderson	3 episodes
1993	Desperate Journey: The Allison Wilcox Story	Steve	Television movie
1994	Armed and Innocent	Lonnie	Television movie
1995	Chicago Hope	Dr. Bob Marinak	1 episode
1995	Courthouse	Andrew Rawson	6 episodes
1995	Remember Me	Adam Nichols	Television movie
1996	High Incident		1 episode
1997	Spy Game	Adam Quill	1 episode
1997	Bridge of Time	Robert Creighton	Television movie
1997	Orleans	Bill Brennecke	1 episode
1997	Law & Order	Eric Martin	1 episode
1998	Oz	Judge Benjamin Fee	1 episode
1998	Trinity	Agent	1 episode
1999	Vengeance Unlimited	Stan Garcos	1 episode
2000	Run the Wild Fields	Silas Green	Television movie
2001-2005	Judging Amy	ASA Jeremy Friedman	4 episodes
2004	Alias	Agent Foster	1 episode
2004-2005	Tru Calling	Richard Davies	6 episodes
2005-2006	Night Stalker	Tony Vincenzo	10 episodes
2006	Commander in Chief	Governor Stan Preston	1 episode
2006	NCIS	NCIS Special Agent in Charge Sam Stevens	1 episode
2006	Invasion	Deputy Buell	1 episode
2006	Without a Trace	Fr. Sean McGinnis	1 episode
2006	The Unit	Bill Lachey	1 episode
2008	Depth Charge	Admiral Butler	Television movie
2008	Ghost Whisperer	Gerald Lucas	1 episode
2011	White Collar	Undersecretary of Asian Affairs Adam Wilson	1 episode
2012	Person of Interest	Denton Weeks	3 episodes
2013–2015	The Americans	Deputy Attorney General	7 episodes
2014	Revolution	President Jack Davis	5 episodes
2014	House of Cards	Drewery	Episode: "Chapter 16"
2015	Forever	Neville	Episode: "Mystery of Murder"
2015	The Following	Nathan	2 episodes
2015	Blindspot	General	Episode: "A Stray Howl"
2015	Madam Secretary	Darren Hahn	2 episodes
2017	Mindhunter	Unit Chief Shepard	8 episodes
2018	One Dollar	Mayor Britt	Episode: "Wilson Furlbee"
2019	The Code	Asa Turnbull	3 Episodes
