= The Fall of Sir Douglas Weatherford =

2026 film by Sean Robert Dunn

- Theatrical release poster
- Directed by: Seán Dunn
- Written by: Seán Dunn
- Produced by: Alex Polunin; Scott Macaulay; Jennifer Monks
- Starring: Peter Mullan; Jakob Oftebro; Lewis MacDougall; Oliver Maltman; Sid Sagar; Kerry Fox; Jimmy Yuill; Jonathan Hyde; Gayle Rankin
- Cinematography: David Gallego
- Edited by: Shakti Bhagchandani
- Music by: Gazelle Twin
- Production company: Ossian Pictures
- Distributed by: Mubi
- Release dates: 30 January 2026 (IFFR); 12 June 2026 (United Kingdom)
- Running time: 95 minutes
- Country: United Kingdom
- Language: English

The Fall of Sir Douglas Weatherford is a 2026 British dark comedy film directed by Seán Dunn. It stars Peter Mullan, Jakob Oftebro, Lewis MacDougall, Oliver Maltman, Sid Sagar, Kerry Fox, Jimmy Yuill, Jonathan Hyde, and Gayle Rankin. The film explores themes of ageing, identity, and the blurred boundary between history and fantasy.

It had its world premiere at the 55th International Film Festival Rotterdam in the Big Screen Competition on 30 January 2026.

== Cast ==
- Peter Mullan as Kenneth
- Jakob Oftebro as Oscar Sorensson
- Lewis MacDougall as Stewart
- Oliver Maltman as Stephen
- Gayle Rankin as Anna
- Sid Sagar as Sal
- Kerry Fox
- Jimmy Yuill
- Jonathan Hyde

== Production ==
The film was shot on location in Scotland and was produced by Alex Polunin for Ossian Pictures, Scott Macaulay for Forensic Films and Jennifer Monks for The Fold. The project was developed with BBC Film and co-financed by the BFI Film Fund, BBC Scotland and Screen Scotland.

== Release ==
Charades handled the international sales, excluding the United Kingdom (UK) and Ireland. Mubi acquired theatrical distribution rights for the UK and Ireland ahead of the film's premiere. The Fall of Sir Douglas Weatherford had its world premiere on 30 January 2026 at the 55th International Film Festival Rotterdam, where it was nominated for a "VPRO Big Screen Award". The film was released in the United Kingdom on 12 June 2026.
