= François Brune (priest) =

French Catholic priest and writer (1931–2019)

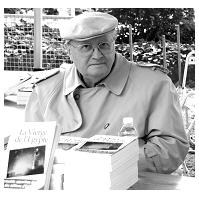
- Pere Brune in 2007
- Born: 18 August 1931; Vernon, Eure, France
- Died: 16 January 2019 (aged 87); Paris
- Education: Institut Catholique de Paris; Biblical Institute of Rome
- Occupations: Catholic priest; author

François Brune (18 August 1931, Vernon, Eure – 16 January 2019, Paris) was a French Catholic priest and writer.

== Biography ==
After a baccalaureate followed by four years of literary preparatory classes and certificates in Sorbonne in classical letters (Latin and ancient Greek), François Brune undertook studies in philosophy and theology (five years at the Institut Catholique de Paris and a year at University of Tübingen). In 1960, he obtained a degree in theology from the Institut catholique and joined the Compagnie des prêtres de Saint-Sulpice before teaching in various major seminaries, in Nantes, Rodez and Bayeux. In 1962, he attended the Biblical Institute of Rome and studied there for two years, and finally went on to study Holy Scripture in 1964. Since 1970, he had devoted himself to writing his books, as well as hosting conferences in various countries, making many trips to meet other researchers.

== Theology ==
Father Brune was interested in many theological questions but most of his theological work has two characteristics: the emphasis on the convergence of the experience of the Catholic mystics of the West with the theological tradition of the Orthodox Churches and not with the prevailing theological currents in the Catholic or Protestant west (influenced by Saint Augustine and Saint Thomas Aquinas); taking into account scientific discoveries, especially those of quantum physics, and phenomena related to death (imminent death experiences) to combat materialism.

In one of his works, François Brune welcomes the return to ideas from before the ecclesial crisis of the 1960s to 2000s, such as the notion of sin or the importance of the sacrament of reconciliation, but also the retreat in the Catholic Church of materialist theses denying the existence and importance of the supernatural and miracles, theses which, according to him, reduce vague humanitarian and philanthropic philosophy. He rejoices at the abandonment of the catechism for children "Living stones" where the divinity of Jesus Christ was affirmed only in a footnote.

However, he does not think that the return to the uses of before Vatican II will be enough to make the Catholic Church credible and attractive and he is open to the ordination of married men practiced in Orthodox Churches, to the reconciliation of the divorced and remarried, to the use of condoms and other forms of birth control. Very hostile to Saint Augustine's "appalling and despairing theology" on the damned masses, he regrets that his influence has been hypertrophied in the West to the detriment of the Greek Fathers much closer in his opinion to true Christianity.

== Publications ==
- "Pour que l'homme devienne Dieu", Ymca-Press, 1983, 2nd ed. Dangles, 1992; 3rd ed.Presses de la Renaissance, collection "Petite Renaissance", 2008, ISBN 978-2-7509-0357-2. New edition, updated, volume 1 and 2, Le temps présent 2013.
- "Les morts nous parlent", volume 1, Le Félin, 1988, 2nd ed. Philippe Lebaud, 1996, 3rd ed., Oxus, 2005, ISBN 978-2-84898-058-4, club edition "Succès du Livre", 1989; France Loisirs, 1994.et 2007. Translated into Bulgarian, Spanish, Italian, Polish, Portuguese and Romanian. Paperback, 2009.
- "À l'écoute de l'au-delà", with the collaboration of Rémy Chauvin, 1st ed. under the title " En direct de l'au-delà ", Robert Laffont, 1993; 2nd ed. Philippe Lebaud, 1999; 3rd ed. Oxus, 2003, ISBN 2-84898-011-7; éditions club Le grand livre du mois, 1999, France Loisirs, 2000; translated into Italian and Portuguese.
- "Must man be saved ? (Christ and karma)" Presses de la Renaissance, collection " Petite Renaissance ", 2007, ISBN 978-2-7509-03466; 1st ed. under the title "Christ and karma - Reconciliation", Dangles,

== Filmography ==
- "Quand l'invisible nous parle", documentary film by Marc-Laurent Turpin, mesure-6 Films, 2006
- Interview of Father Brune on France 2: Link to video
- Intervention of Father Brune during a report on the instrumental transcommunication: Link to video
- "Retour dans l'au-delà", documentary film by Marc-Laurent Turpin, mesure-6 Films, 2007
- Father Brune lectures on communication with the afterlife and cases of possession. Link to video.

== Namesake ==
=== Another François Brune ===
There is another author who, without knowing it and therefore without any bad intention, took my first and last name as a pseudonym. He first wrote books in the collection "Signes de piste" for teenagers, then he specialized in economics and advertising

In fact, this other François Brune published as early as 1973 a story entitled "Memoirs of a future President" in the Newspaper "Combat": as he explains on his literary blog, it was on this occasion that he gave himself this author's name by combining his first name and that of his wife. He naturally kept it when he then published articles in "Le Monde", then his essay "Le Bonheur conforme", at Gallimard, in 1981. Known from that time under this signature, he knew only much later that there was a priest with this name. Hence his good faith in maintaining his signature.

== See also ==
- Catholic Church in France
- Pellegrino Ernetti
