= Last Seen Alive =

2022 American action thriller film

- South African theatrical release poster
- Directed by: Brian Goodman
- Written by: Marc Frydman
- Produced by: Gerard Butler; Taylor Conrod; Marc Frydman; Brian Pitt; Bob Shapiro; David Shojai; Alan Siegel
- Starring: Gerard Butler; Jaimie Alexander; Russell Hornsby; Ethan Embry
- Cinematography: Peter Holland
- Edited by: Julia Wong
- Music by: Sam Ewing
- Production companies: Voltage Pictures; Perfection Hunter Productions; G-BASE; Marc Frydman Productions
- Distributed by: Voltage Pictures; Vertical Entertainment
- Release date: June 3, 2022
- Running time: 95 minutes
- Country: United States
- Language: English
- Box office: $5.9 million

Last Seen Alive is a 2022 American action thriller film directed by Brian Goodman and written by Marc Frydman. It stars Gerard Butler, who also produced the film, Jaimie Alexander and Russell Hornsby. Formerly known as Chase, the film follows a man who takes the law into his own hands in the search for his missing wife.

It was released in the United States on June 3, 2022 and received mixed reviews from critics. On October 1, 2022, the film was released on Netflix and instantly became Netflix's most watched film in the United States. The film also found international success on Netflix and was placed on "Top 10 Most Watched Films" lists in numerous countries.

== Plot ==
Wealthy real-estate agent Will Spann and his wife Lisa are driving to Lisa's parents' house, as she is preoccupied with her internal struggles in their marriage. They pull over at a gas station for Will to refill the tank while Lisa enters the store to buy bottled water, only for her to never return to his car. Paranoid, Will searches around the gas station for his wife but to no avail, save for her personal belongings. He dials 911 to file a missing persons report, whose call is forwarded to Detective Paterson, who tells him to stay put.

Before Paterson could arrive, Will heads to Lisa's parents' house, to ask Barry and Anna Adams for the whereabouts of Lisa and any of her friends she may have spoken to, but gets no information. Flashbacks suggest tension between the couple around their marriage and that her parents had not fully trusted Will. Returning to the gas station, he finally meets Detective Paterson, who proceeds to question the gas station clerk, Oscar. He claims the cameras are broken, but as Paterson leaves, Will notices one of the cameras positioned right at the store entrance is operational, making him suspect that Oscar is involved in Lisa's disappearance.

After a physical altercation, Will forcefully retrieves the CCTV recorder from Oscar and delivers it to the local police station. They spot Lisa leaving with a man, but lost sight of them due to a truck blocking their view, before the two, along with a 1963 Ford Fairlane had disappeared on sight. Will becomes aggravated by the line of questioning when Patterson mentions Lisa's life insurance and leaves.

Upon revealing the footage to the Adams, they recognize the man to be Knuckles, their handyman who had worked on their house and knows Lisa. Will tracks down and subdues Knuckles, who confesses that he took her to Frank and offers to take him to his hideout. Will tapes Knuckles and is carried in the back of his SUV, but is forced to abandon the car when he is pulled over by the police. After running aimlessly through the forest, he ruses an armed man to pointing towards Frank's hideout, which is a derelict drug den.

There, Will finds Frank, as well as Oscar, confirming his earlier suspicions of the latter's involvement in Lisa's disappearance. He sneaks around the camp and holds both Frank and one of his men at gunpoint, demanding to know where Lisa is. The three exchange gunfire with both Frank and his henchman shot dead, leaving Will despondent that the whereabouts of Lisa died with them. Simultaneously, Detective Paterson presses Knuckles, who is revealed in a flashback to have been coerced by Frank into abducting Lisa and claims that she was dead.

At the camp, Will is confronted by Oscar, who demands a large sum of money for information on Lisa. At that moment, Oscar is killed as the drug lab explodes, caused by a small fire that was triggered in the earlier firefight. The explosion attracts the attention of Paterson; he searches the camp for the hole where Knuckles claims he dug for Lisa, but finds it empty. Will hears banging from the shed behind him and finds a terrified but alive Lisa tied up.

At the Adams' residence, Detective Paterson confides to Will of Knuckles' confession. He also reveals there are gunshot wounds among the victims incinerated in the explosion but does not dig further and departs, wishing him well. The film ends as Lisa invites Will inside her home.

== Cast ==
- Gerard Butler as Will Spann
- Jaimie Alexander as Lisa Spann
- Russell Hornsby as Detective Paterson
- Ethan Embry as Knuckles
- Michael Irby as Oscar
- David Kallaway as Frank
- Alphonso A'Qen-Aten Jackson as Larry
- Cindy Hogan as Anna Adams, Lisa's mother
- Bruce Altman as Barry Adams, Lisa's father

== Production and release ==
The film was shot under the title of Chase and was acquired for distribution by Voltage Pictures in July 2021. It was added to Netflix in the United States on October 1, 2022. Last Seen Alive became Netflix's most watched film following its release in the U.S., Philippines, Thailand, Vietnam and Hong Kong. The film placed at #2 in Singapore, Taiwan and Indonesia and #6 in India.

On November 3, 2022, Variety reported that Last Seen Alive had 747 million minutes viewed on Netflix and the film debuted at number 6 on Nielsen Streaming Top 10 list. On the week of January 30– February 5, 2023, Last Seen Alive placed at #1 on Netflix's list of most watched films, "Top 10 By Country" in Denmark, #2 in Finland and Sweden, and #3 in Norway.

== Reception ==
On Rotten Tomatoes, the film holds an approval rating of 13% based on 15 reviews, with an average rating of 3.9/10. Common Sense Media gave the film 2 stars out of 5, claiming the film failed to "manage to create a sense of intrigue about any of its characters". The plot has been noted to be "achingly similar to that of the 1997 Kurt Russell film Breakdown".
