= Ethan Embry =

American actor (born 1978)

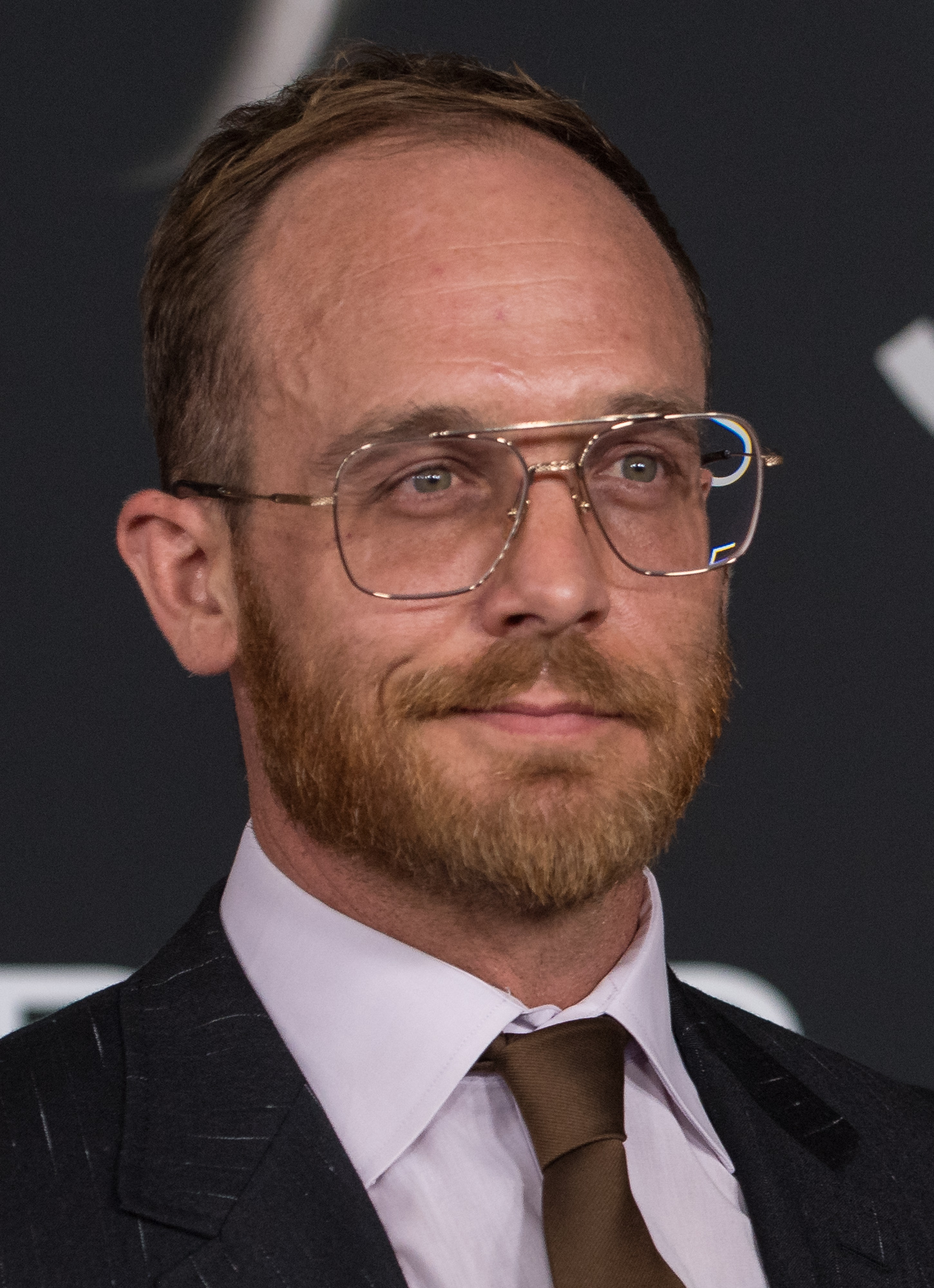
- Embry in 2018
- Born: June 13, 1978 (age 48); Huntington Beach, California, U.S.
- Occupation: Actor
- Years active: 1990–present
- Spouses: Amelinda Smith (m. 1998; div. 2002); Sunny Mabrey (m. 2005; div. 2012) (m. 2015)
- Children: 1

Ethan Embry (born June 13, 1978), credited early in his career as Ethan Randall, is an American actor. He began his career as a child actor, with starring roles in the films Dutch (1991), All I Want for Christmas (1991), and A Far Off Place (1993). He gained mainstream recognition for his supporting role in Empire Records (1995) and starring roles in Evolver (1995) and That Thing You Do! (1996).

In the late 1990s, Embry had the lead role in the teen comedy film Can't Hardly Wait (1998), starred in Vegas Vacation (1997) and Dancer, Texas Pop. 81 (1998), and a main role as Sebastian on the CBS sitcom Work with Me (1999). In the 2000s, Embry starred in the films They (2002) and Vacancy (2007) and had main roles as Derek and Adam Barnes on the Fox television series FreakyLinks (2000–2001), Frank Smith on the ABC television series L.A. Dragnet (2003), and Declan Giggs on the Showtime television series Brotherhood (2006–2008).

In the 2010s and 2020s, Embry starred in the films Cheap Thrills (2013), Blindspotting (2018), and Last Seen Alive (2022), and had a main role as Coyote Bergstein on the Netflix television series Grace and Frankie (2015–2022). He had supporting roles in the films Christy (2025) and Scream 7 (2026).

== Early life ==
Embry was born in Huntington Beach, California, and was raised in Los Angeles. His father was a dental technician. Embry was homeschooled by his mother as a result of a teacher allegedly recommending Ritalin after his first day of kindergarten.

Embry participated in gymnastics from a young age and enjoyed the sport.

== Career ==
Embry (originally credited as Ethan Randall) started acting at the age of 12. After making his debut in Defending Your Life (1991), he starred in several films, including Dutch (1991), All I Want for Christmas (1991), A Far Off Place (1993), Empire Records (1995), That Thing You Do! (1996), Vegas Vacation (1997), and the teen comedy Can't Hardly Wait (1998).

In 2002, Embry appeared as Bobby Ray Bailey opposite Reese Witherspoon in Sweet Home Alabama. The two actors had previously worked together a decade prior in the 1993 live action Disney film A Far Off Place.

Embry had a major role in Showtime's Brotherhood, which premiered in 2006 and in 2013 he had a recurring role as Greg Mendell on the television series Once Upon a Time. In 2015, Embry had a guest role as Carter on The Walking Dead. That same year, Embry began a recurring role as Coyote Bergstein on Grace and Frankie on Netflix.

In 2018, Embry took a small role as astronaut Pete Conrad in the Damien Chazelle film First Man.

Embry has appeared in a recurring role as the real Pete Murphy in Sneaky Pete, an Amazon Video original series. He was also on Grey's Anatomy in 2012 where he played Prosthetist Dr. David Moore.

== Personal life ==
Embry married actress Amelinda Smith on November 14, 1998; they divorced in 2002. They have a son together.

Embry married actress Sunny Mabrey on July 17, 2005. In 2012, Mabrey filed for divorce, citing irreconcilable differences. The two maintained some contact through Mabrey's weekly contact with his son, which escalated to the couple dating again by 2013, then remarrying in June 2015. Embry and Mabrey have homes in Los Angeles and Atlanta.

In November 2006, Embry and Mabrey were robbed at gunpoint in their driveway.

In 2008, Embry settled a lawsuit with former Deal or No Deal model Angelina Roudeva, who had sued him after being scarred over her torso when thrown from his motorcycle in 2005.

== Filmography ==
Key
†	Denotes films that have not yet been released

=== Film ===
Year	Title	Role	Notes
1991	Defending Your Life	Steve	Credited as Ethan Randall
1991	Dutch	Doyle Standish	Credited as Ethan Randall
1991	All I Want for Christmas	Ethan O'Fallon	Credited as Ethan Randall
1992	A Dog and His Boy	—N/a	Short film (Producer/Assistant Director)
1993	A Far Off Place	Harry Winslow	Credited as Ethan Randall
1994	Season of Change	Bobby Bascomb	Credited as Ethan Randall
1995	Evolver	Kyle Baxter	Credited as Ethan Randall
1995	Empire Records	Mark	Credited as Ethan Randall
1996	White Squall	Tracy Lapchick	
1996	That Thing You Do!	The Bass Player	
1997	Vegas Vacation	Rusty Griswold/Nick Papagiorgio	
1998	Montana	Jimmy	
1998	How to Make the Cruelest Month	Dillger	
1998	The Prophecy II	Young Coroner	Direct-to-video
1998	Dancer, Texas Pop. 81	Squirrel	
1998	Can't Hardly Wait	Preston Meyers	
1998	Disturbing Behavior	Allen Clark	
2000	The Independent	Bert	
2001	Rennie's Landing	Trevor Logan	also known as "Stealing Time"
2001	Ball in the House	Bobby	
2001	Male Order	Actor #2	Short film
2001	Who Is A.B.?	unknown role	
2002	Sweet Home Alabama	Bobby Ray	
2002	They	Sam Burnside	
2003	Manfast	Johnny Shore	
2003	Timeline	Josh Stern	
2004	Harold & Kumar Go to White Castle	Billy Carver	
2005	Pizza	Matt Firenze	
2005	Standing Still	Donovan	
2006	A Slice of 'Pizza'	Matt Firenze	Short film
2006	Escape	Hollywood Agent #1	Short film
2006	Kidney Thieves	Guy	Short film
2007	Vacancy	Mechanic	
2007	Order Up	Man	Short film
2008	Player 5150	Joey	
2008	Heart of a Dragon	Lee	
2008	Eagle Eye	Agent Toby Grant	
2010	You're So Vain	Boyfriend	Short film
2010	The Kane Files: Life of Trial	Jace Olsen	
2011	The Reunion	Leo Carey	
2012	Dorothy and the Witches of Oz	Frick	
2012	Ordinary Man	Jason Watts	
2013	Cheap Thrills	Vince	
2013	The House Across the Street	Tom	
2013	Armed Response	Kevin	
2014	The Guest	Higgings	
2014	Late Phases	Will	
2015	Bereave	Tommy	
2015	Echoes of War	Seamus Riley	
2015	Covergence	Daniel	
2015	White Cops and Unarmed Black Civilians Playset!	unknown role	Short film
2015	The Devil's Candy	Jesse Hellman	
2016	Fashionista	Eric	
2016	Those Eyes	Son	Short film
2017	The Feminist	—N/a	Short film (Cinematographer)
2018	Blindspotting	Officer Molina	
2018	Nathaniel Rateliff & The Night Sweats: You Worry Me	Husband	Short film
2018	First Man	Pete Conrad	
2022	Last Seen Alive	Knuckles	
2025	Alma and the Wolf	Ren Accord	
2025	Christy	John Salters	
2025	Safe House	Sorello	
2026	The Gymnast	Rich	
2026	Scream 7	Marco Davis	
2026	By Any Means	Sam Bowers	

=== Television ===
Year	Title	Role	Notes
1990	Drug Wars: The Camarena Story	unknown role	Miniseries (3 episodes)
1991	Bad Attitudes	Cosmo Consingsby	Credited as Ethan Randall
1993–1994	Harts of the West	Randy	2 episodes, credited as Ethan Randall
1994	Murder, She Wrote	Jimmy Taylor	Episode: "The Trouble with Seth"
1995	Murder, She Wrote	Mike Seresino	Episode: "School for Murder"
1998	Hercules	Melampus	Voice, 2 episodes
1999	The Wild Thornberrys	Ned Fervel	Voice, episode: "Chimp Off the Old Block"
1999	Rocket Power	TV Announcer	Voice, episode: "Rocket Girls"
1999–2000	Batman Beyond	Lee, Terrapin	Voice, 2 episodes
1999–2000	Work with Me	Sebastian	Series regular (10 episodes)
2000	Get Real	Wade Kostick	Episode: "Saved"
2000–2001	FreakyLinks	Derek Barnes / Adam Barnes	Series regular (13 episodes)
2001	The Zeta Project	Bodhi	Voice, episode: "His Maker's Name"
2001	Silicon Follies	unknown role	Television film
2002	The Twilight Zone	Zack Walker	Episode: "Time Lapse"
2003	L.A. Dragnet	Detective Frank Smith	Series regular (12 episodes)
2003	Spider-Man: The New Animated Series	Max Dillon / Electro	Voice, 3 episodes
2004	Celeste in the City	Kyle Halley	Television film
2004	Life on Liberty Street	Rick Spencer	Television film
2005	Numb3rs	Blake Cosnell	Episode: "Noisy Edge"
2005	Masters of Horror	Bruce	Episode: "Incident on and Off a Mountain Road"
2006	Law & Order: Criminal Intent	Art Geddons	Episode: "Watch"
2006–2008	Brotherhood	Declan 'Decko' Griggs	Series regular (20 episodes)
2009	Fear Itself	Chance Miller	Episode: "Chance"
2010	House M.D.	Mickey	Episode: "The Down Low"
2010	Biography	Himself (Interviewee)	Episode: "Ed O'Neill"
2011	Fairly Legal	Spencer Reed	3 episodes
2011	CSI: Miami	Randy North	2 episodes
2011	Thunderballs	unknown role	Television film
2012	Imaginary Friend	Brad	Television film
2012	Drop Dead Diva	Mark Baker	Episode: "Jane's Getting Married"
2012	Dark Wall	Man	Episode: "6:14"
2012	Grey's Anatomy	Dr. David Moore	Episode: "I Saw Her Standing There"
2012	The Frontier	D.J. Jackson	Television film
2013	Once Upon a Time	Greg Mendell	Recurring role (Season 2–3; 10 episodes)
2014	CSI: Crime Scene Investigation	Jefferson Nalley	Episode: "Keep Calm and Carry-On"
2014	Hawaii Five-0	Shawn Hutten	Episode: "Pale 'la"
2015	The Walking Dead	Carter	Episode: "First Time Again"
2015–2019	Sneaky Pete	Pete Murphy / Real Pete	Recurring role (11 episodes)
2015–2022	Grace and Frankie	Coyote Bergstein	Series regular (53 episodes)
2017	A Bunch of Dicks	Mick	Miniseries
2017	Idiotsitter	unknown role	Episode: "Girls Gone Wild"
2020	The Twilight Zone	Harry Pine	Episode: "The Who of You"
2021	Stargirl	Johnny Thunder	2 episodes
2021	Creepshow	Hank	Episode: "Mums"
2023	Gotham Knights	Arthur Brown	3 episodes
2024	Blue Ridge	Powell Padgett	Episode: "Locked In"
2026	Cape Fear	Ollie	2 episodes
