= Thyestes (Ennius) =

Ancient tragedy

Thyestes is a lost tragedy in Latin by the Roman poet Ennius, assumed to be based on the (also lost) Greek play Thyestes by Euripides. It was Ennius' last play, performed at the Ludi Apollinares between 6 and 13 July 169 BC, immediately before his death, according to Cicero. Ten fragments of the play have been identified in later authors, including Cicero's comment that "Thyestes curses with really splendid verses in Ennius."

An Italian Benedictine monk, Father Pellegrino Ernetti, claimed in the 1950s to have viewed the play being performed in ancient times, using a supposed Chronovisor time viewer, and to have made a transcription. This claim is unsubstantiated.

== Translations and Editions ==
- Ennius, Fragmentary Republican Latin, Vol. II: Ennius, Dramatic Fragments, Minor Works. Edited by Sander M. Goldberg and Genie Manuwald. Loeb Classical Library. Cambridge MA: Harvard University Press, 2018.
- Jocelyn, H.D. (1967) The Tragedies of Ennius: The fragments. London: Cambridge University Press.
