= Supporting Role =

2026 Georgian drama film

- Promotional poster
- Georgian: მეორეხარისხოვანი როლი
- Directed by: Ana Urushadze
- Screenplay by: Ana Urushadze
- Produced by: Ivo Felt; Zeynep Özbatur Atakan
- Starring: Dato Bakhtadze; Nata Murvanidze; Elene Maisuradze; Irakli Kvirikadze; Zurab Sturua; Eka Demetradze; Sandro Samkharadze; Nino Kasradze; Davit Dvalishvili; Lasha Mebuke; Murman Jinoria
- Cinematography: Rein Kotov
- Edited by: Levan Uchaneishvili
- Music by: Sten Sheripov
- Production companies: Zazafilms; Allfilm; Enkeny Films; Cinetrain; Zeyno Film; Melograno Films
- Release date: February 3, 2026 (IFFR)
- Running time: 139 minutes
- Countries: Georgia; Estonia; Turkey
- Languages: Georgian; Armenian

Supporting Role (Georgian: მეორეხარისხოვანი როლი) is a 2026 drama film written, and directed by Ana Urushadze. A co-production between Georgia, Estonia, and Turkey, the film follows a retired Georgian film star, used to playing heroic leads, embarks on a cathartic odyssey after being offered a supporting role of an unpleasant elderly man.

The film had its world premiere at the 55th International Film Festival Rotterdam in Tiger Competition on 3 February 2026, where it won Special Jury and FIPRESCI Awards.

It held its International premiere at the 32nd Sarajevo Film Festival on 19 August 2026, screening in the Competition Programme – Feature Film, and competed for the Heart of Sarajevo award.

== Synopsis ==
Niaz Ninua was once a famous actor, but his career faded after he left films 15 years ago. When he finally tries to come back, he realizes the industry has moved on without him. He goes to an audition for a small part in a young woman's first film. The experience hurts his ego, and he walks out annoyed, calling the role pretentious and insisting that the old, unattractive character has nothing to do with him. But later, as he thinks about the meeting, he starts to feel strangely drawn to the very role he rejected. What first seemed beneath him begins to show unexpected depth.

== Cast ==
- Dato Bakhtadze as Niaz
- Nata Murvanidze
- Elene Maisuradze
- Irakli Kvirikadze
- Zurab Sturua
- Eka Demetradze
- Sandro Samkharadze
- Nino Kasradze
- Davit Dvalishvili
- Lasha Mebuke
- Murman Jinoria

== Production ==
The film was in post-production in September 2024.

== Release ==
Supporting Role had its world premiere at the 55th International Film Festival Rotterdam on 3 February 2026, in Tiger competition section. Subsequently, in mid April it competed for Tiantan Award at the 16th Beijing International Film Festival, where it won Tiantan Best Music Award.

It had its International Premiere at the 32nd Sarajevo Film Festival, where it competed for Heart of Sarajevo award in the Competition Programme - Feature Film in August 2026.

It will also be presented in the 'Create' section of the 2026 BFI London Film Festival on 7 October 2026.

== Reception ==
Vladan Petkovic of Cineuropa reviewing the film at IFFR's Tiger Competition, praised it as a richly textured existential drama, highlighting Ana Urushadze's assured direction and Dato Bakhtadze's performance as the film's greatest strength. Petkovic observed that Urushadze and Bakhtadze together created a work of "striking richness," blending surrealism with everyday reality while developing a distinctive rhythm that rewards repeat viewings. Petkovic described the film as filled with quirky, dreamlike episodes, yet praised the director's "rock-solid" vision and confident filmmaking. He further highlighted Rein Kotov's sepia-toned cinematography and Sten Sheripov's playful jazz-influenced score for reinforcing the film's tragicomic atmosphere. Although he acknowledged that the narrative "may prove elusive for some audiences," he concluded that its exploration of identity and self-perception remains widely relatable, calling it "a rare film that's equally open to interpretation yet very direct in its message."

== Accolades ==
The film was shortlisted for a nomination at the 39th European Film Awards in the Feature Film category.

Award	Date of ceremony	Category	Recipient	Result	Ref.
International Film Festival Rotterdam	8 February 2026	Special Jury Awards	Supporting Role	Won	
International Film Festival Rotterdam	8 February 2026	FIPRESCI Award	Supporting Role	Won	
Beijing International Film Festival	25 April 2026	Tiantan Best Music	Supporting Role	Won	
Sarajevo Film Festival	21 August 2026	Heart of Sarajevo	Supporting Role	Nominated	
