= Time travel claims and urban legends =

Alleged reports of time traveling

Multiple accounts of people who allegedly travelled through time have been reported by the press or circulated online. These reports have turned out to be either hoaxes or else based on incorrect assumptions, incomplete information, or interpretation of fiction as fact. Many are now recognized as urban legends.

== Alleged time travelers ==
=== Charlotte Anne Moberly and Eleanor Jourdain ===
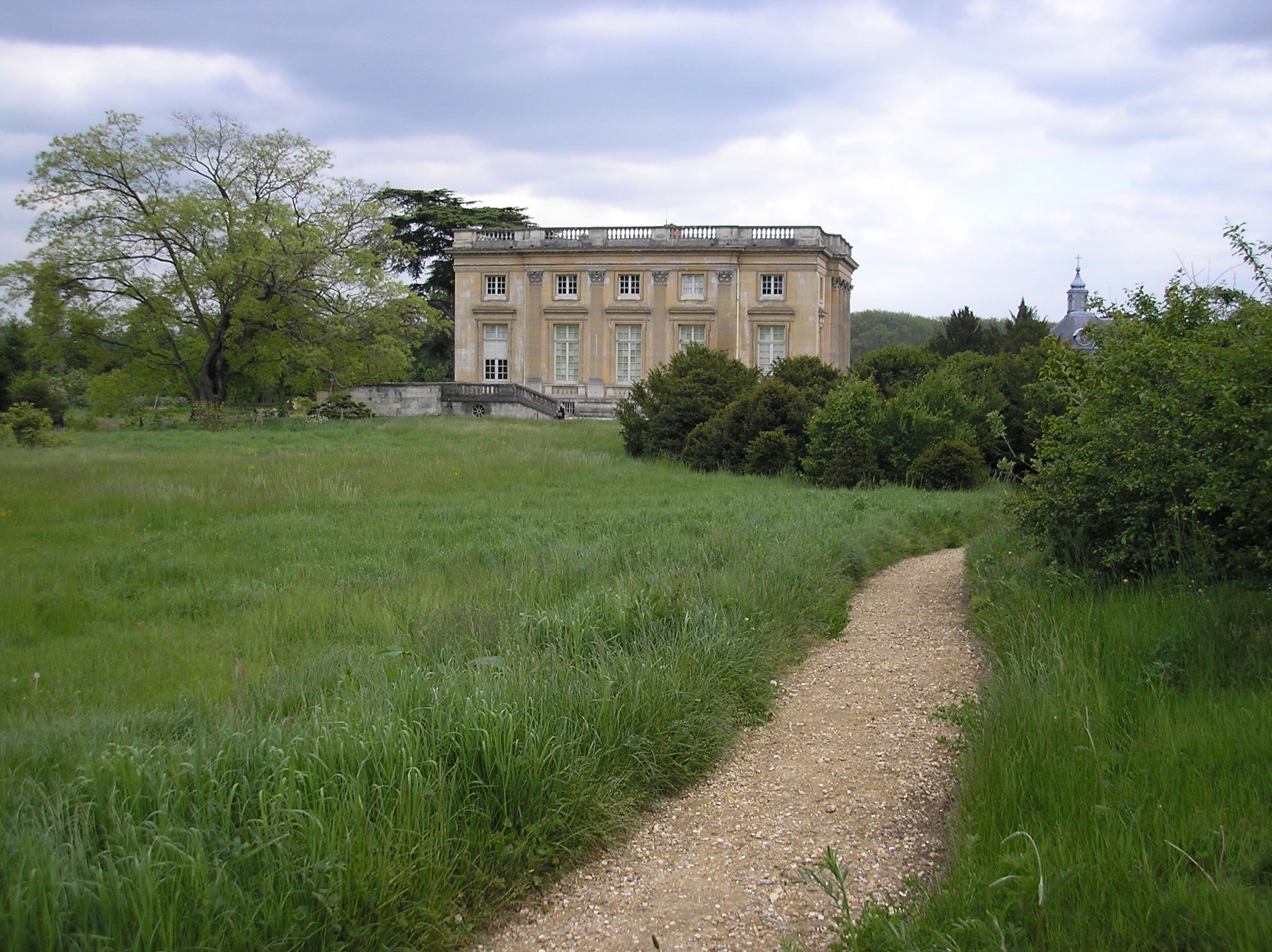
The Petit Trianon in 2005, where the incident purportedly took place.

In 1911, Charlotte Anne Moberly (1846–1937) and Eleanor Jourdain (1863–1924) published a book entitled An Adventure, under the names of "Elizabeth Morison" and "Frances Lamont". They described a visit to the Petit Trianon, a small château in the grounds of the Palace of Versailles, where they claimed they saw ghosts, including that of Marie Antoinette and others. Their story caused a sensation but was not taken seriously.

=== "Chaplin's Time Traveller" ===
In October 2010, Northern Irish filmmaker George Clarke uploaded a video clip entitled "Chaplin's Time Traveller" to YouTube. The clip analyzes bonus material in a DVD of the Charlie Chaplin film The Circus. Included in the DVD is footage from the film's Los Angeles premiere at Grauman's Chinese Theatre in 1928. At one point, a woman is seen walking by, holding up an object to her ear. Clarke said that, on closer examination, she was talking into a thin, black device that appeared to be a cellphone. Clarke concluded that the woman was possibly a time traveller. The clip received millions of hits and was the subject of televised news stories.

Nicholas Jackson, associate editor for The Atlantic, says the most likely answer is that she was using a portable hearing aid, a technology that was just being developed at the time. Philip Skroska, an archivist at the Bernard Becker Medical Library of Washington University School of Medicine, thought that the woman might have been holding a rectangular ear trumpet. New York Daily News writer Michael Sheridan said the device was probably an early hearing aid, perhaps an Acousticon manufactured by Miller Reese Hutchison.

=== Present-day hipster at 1941 bridge opening ===
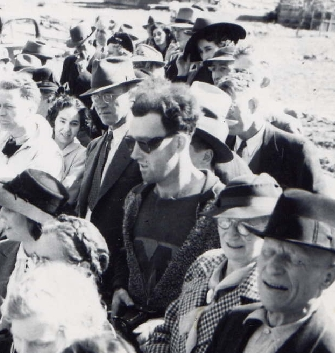
"The Time Travelling Hipster"

A photograph from 1941 of genuine authenticity of the re-opening of the South Fork Bridge in Gold Bridge, British Columbia, is sometimes alleged on the internet to show a time traveler. It was claimed that his clothing and sunglasses were of the present day and not of the styles worn in the 1940s, while his camera was anachronistically small.

Further research suggested that the man's present-day appearance would not necessarily have been out of place in 1941. The style of sunglasses he is wearing first appeared in the 1920s. On first glance, the man is taken by many to be wearing a printed graphic T-shirt, but on closer inspection, it seems to be a sweater with a sewn-on emblem, the kind of clothing often worn by sports teams of the period. The shirt resembles one worn by the Montreal Maroons, an ice hockey team from that era. The remainder of his clothing would appear to have been available at the time, though his clothes are far more casual than those worn by the other individuals in the photograph. His camera is smaller than most of that era, but cameras of that size did exist; while it is unclear what make his camera was, Kodak had manufactured portable cameras of equivalent size since 1938.

The "Time Traveling Hipster" became a case study in viral Internet phenomena which was presented at the Museums and the Web 2011 conference in Philadelphia.

=== Mobile device in 1943 ===
A photograph from 1943 of genuine authenticity, showing a scene of holidaymakers on Towan Beach in Newquay, Cornwall, was uploaded to Twitter in September 2018 by multimedia artist Stuart Humphryes, which was alleged by some viewers to show a time traveller operating an anachronistic mobile device, such as a phone. This tweet was picked up by news outlets including Fox News in the US, and various tabloid newspapers in the UK, such as The Daily Mirror. Fuelled by media websites such as LADbible it gained global coverage via news outlets in Russia, Iran, Taiwan, Hungary, China and Vietnam, amongst others. Humphryes, the original uploader, was quoted in these stories as dismissing the time travel theories, stating that the man in question was probably just rolling a cigarette.

=== Rudolph Fentz ===
The story of Rudolph Fentz is an urban legend from the early 1950s and has been repeated since as a reproduction of facts and presented as evidence for the existence of time travel. The essence of the legend is that in New York City in 1951 a man wearing 19th-century clothes was hit by a car. The subsequent investigation revealed that the man had disappeared without a trace in 1876. The items in his possession suggested that the man had traveled through time from 1876 to 1951 directly.

The folklorist Chris Aubeck investigated the story and found it originated in a science fiction book, A Voice from the Gallery (1953) by Ralph M. Holland, which had copied the tale from "I'm Scared" (1951), a short story by Jack Finney (1911–1995).

=== Mike "Madman" Marcum ===
In 1995, a caller to Art Bell's syndicated radio show Coast to Coast AM named Mike Marcum claimed to have discovered a means of time travel using a Jacob's ladder. In attempting to build a larger version of this device, Marcum admitted that he had stolen several power transformers from the local power company, St. Joseph Light and Power in King City, Missouri; in using them to power his "time machine" he caused a local blackout that brought him to the attention of authorities. Police records confirmed that he had been arrested for this theft and sentenced to 60 days in jail plus a suspended sentence. He called the radio show again in 1996, stating he was building a second "time machine" from legally acquired parts, and was 30 days from completing the device. He claimed to have sent around 200 items and small animals through this device and announced that he would travel through it himself. Marcum then "disappeared" in 1997. His absence led to a number of theories, as well as giving birth to a number of urban legends.

In 2015, Bell interviewed him again on his radio show, Midnight in the Desert, where Marcum claimed that he had been transported two years into the future and 800 miles (1,300 km) away, landing near Fairfield, Ohio, but suffered amnesia. While living in a homeless shelter, Marcum slowly remembered his name, his Social Security number, and other memories that enabled him to re-enter society. However, the Missouri State Highway Patrol has no record of him being reported as a missing person.

=== John Titor ===
Between 2000 and 2001, an online bulletin board user who self-identified as John Titor became popular, claiming to be a time traveler from 2036 on a military mission. Holding the many-worlds interpretation as correct and consequently every time travel paradox as impossible, he stated that many events which occurred up to his time would indeed occur in this timeline. These included a devastating civil war in the US in 2008 followed by a short nuclear World War III in 2015, which will "kill three billion people".

In the years following his last posts and disappearance in 2001, the failure to fulfill his specific predictions led to a decrease in his popularity. Criticism has pointed out flaws in Titor's stories, and investigations suggested his character may be a hoax and a creation of two siblings from Florida.

The story has been retold on numerous websites, in a book, in the Japanese visual novel/anime Steins; Gate, and in a play. He may also have been discussed occasionally on the radio show Coast to Coast AM.

=== Bob White/Tim Jones ===
Similar to John Titor, Bob White, or Tim Jones sent an unknown number of spam emails between 2001 and 2003. The subject of the emails was always the same: an individual seeking someone who could supply a "Dimensional Warp Generator." In some instances, he claimed to be a time traveler stuck in 2003, and in others he claimed to be seeking the parts only from other time travelers. Several recipients began to respond in kind, claiming to have equipment such as the requested dimensional warp generator. One recipient, Dave Hill, set up an online shop from which the time traveler purchased the warp generator (formerly a hard drive motor), while another Dave charged thousands of dollars for time-travel "courses" before he would sell the requested hardware.

The name "Bob White" was taken from an alias that the second Dave used when responding (a reference to the "Bob-Whites" of Trixie Belden-fame). Soon afterward, the time traveler was identified as professional spammer Robert J. Todino (known as "Robby"). Todino's attempts to travel in time were a serious belief, and while he believed he was "perfectly mentally stable," his father was concerned that those replying to his emails had been preying on Todino's psychological problems.

In his book Spam Kings, journalist Brian S. McWilliams, who had originally uncovered Todino's identity for Wired magazine, revealed that Todino had been previously diagnosed with dissociative disorder and schizophrenia, explaining the psychological problems of which his father had spoken. Todino's time traveller was referenced in the song "Rewind" by jazz trio Groovelily on their 2003 album Are we there yet? The song used phrases taken from Todino's emails within its lyrics.

=== Andrew Carlssin ===
Andrew Carlssin was supposedly arrested in March 2003 for SEC violations for making 126 high-risk stock trades and being successful on every one. As reported, Carlssin started with an initial investment of $800 and ended with over $350,000,000, which drew the SEC's attention. Later reports suggest that after his arrest, he submitted a four-hour confession wherein he claimed to be a time traveler from 200 years in the future. He offered to tell investigators such things as the whereabouts of Osama bin Laden and the cure for AIDS in return for a lesser punishment and to be allowed to return to his time craft, although he refused to tell investigators the location or workings of his craft. A mysterious man posted his bail, and Carlssin was scheduled for a court hearing but was never seen again; records show that he never existed.

The Carlssin story likely originated as a fictional piece in Weekly World News, a satirical newspaper, and was later repeated by Yahoo! News, where its fictitious nature became less apparent. It was soon reported by other newspapers and magazines as fact. This, in turn, drove word-of-mouth spread through email inboxes and internet forums, leading to far more detailed descriptions of events.

=== Håkan Nordkvist ===
A video uploaded in 2006 shows a Swedish man named Håkan Nordkvist claiming he was accidentally transported to 2046 while attempting to fix the sink in his kitchen. There in the future, he immediately met someone who turned out to be himself, about 70 years old, and with whom he "had a great time". He filmed short footage of the two smiling and hugging each other and showing the tattoo they had on their right arms.

The story was part of a marketing campaign promoting an insurance company's pension plans.

=== Smartphone in an 1860 painting ===
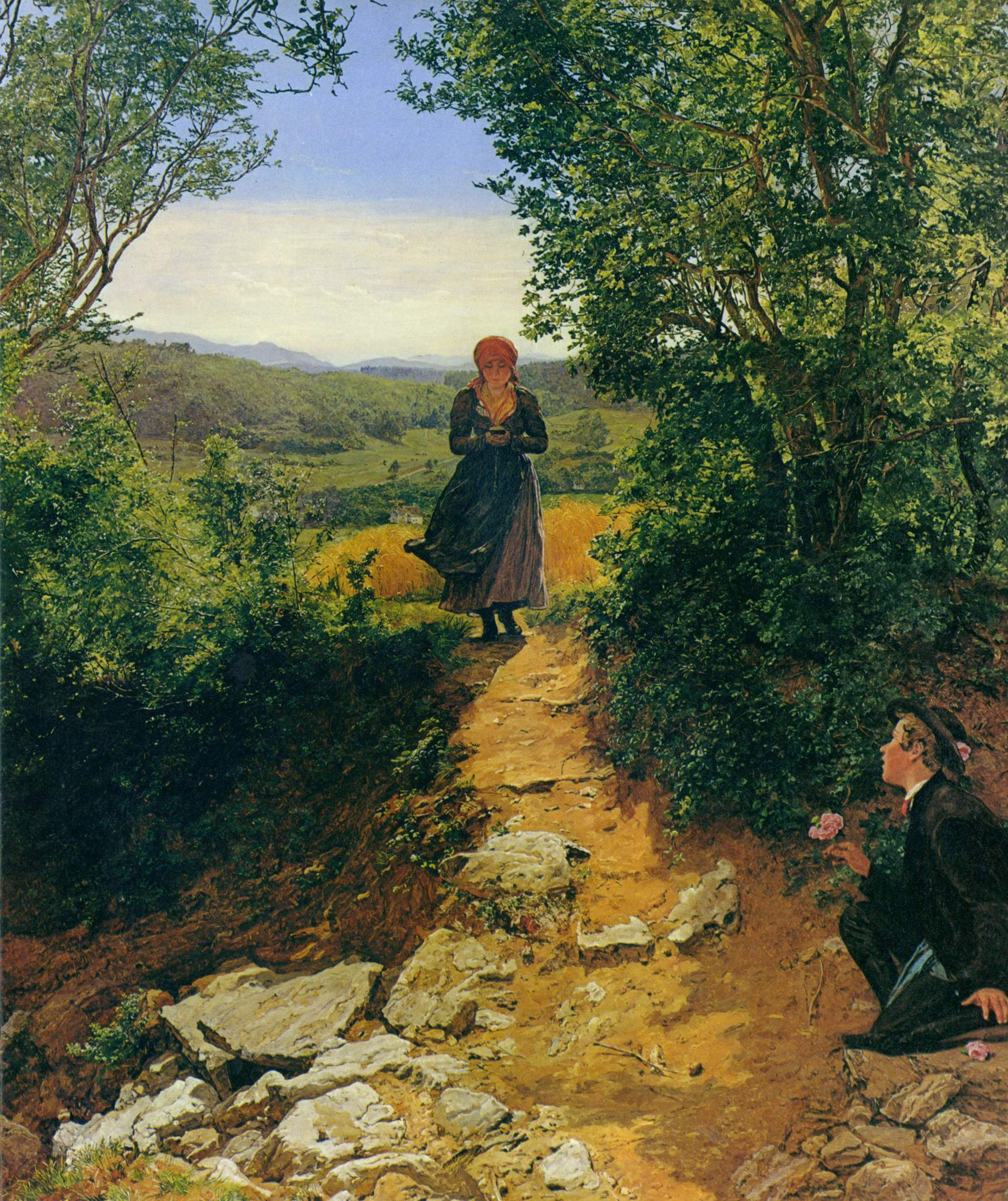
Ferdinand Georg Waldmüller's Die Erwartete (The Expected; 1860)

Some online viewers claimed that an 1860 painting by Austrian artist Ferdinand Georg Waldmüller titled The Expected depicted a woman holding a mobile phone and staring down at it while strolling along a country path. However, art experts debunked these claims, stating that the alleged mobile phone the woman was holding in the painting was actually a prayer book.

== Alleged time-travel technology ==
=== Die Glocke ===
Die Glocke ("The Bell") is a purported Nazi time machine that was supposedly part of a flying saucer.

=== The Chronovisor ===
Italian Benedictine monk Pellegrino Ernetti claimed to have used a time viewer that could film the past without sound. Using this device, which he called the "chronovisor", he allegedly was able to obtain a photograph of the Crucifixion of Jesus and view other scenes from ancient Rome, such as a performance of the lost play Thyestes.

Author Paul J. Nahin has suggested that a short story by Horace Gold (using the pen name Dudley Dell) called "The Biography Project" published in Galaxy Science Fiction magazine might have provided the inspiration for Ernetti's claim.

According to Guardian writer Mark Pilkington: "Ernetti's glory was short-lived. Another magazine revealed that Christ was a reversed image of a postcard from the Santuario dell'Amore Misericordioso, in the town of Collevalenza. More recently, doubt has been cast on his 'transcription' of Thyestes, and an apparent deathbed confession has also surfaced."

=== Iranian time machine ===
In April 2013, the Iranian news agency Fars reported that a 27-year-old Iranian scientist had invented a time machine that allowed people to see into the future. A few days later, the story was removed and replaced with one quoting an Iranian government official who said no such device had been registered.

=== Philadelphia Experiment and Montauk Project ===
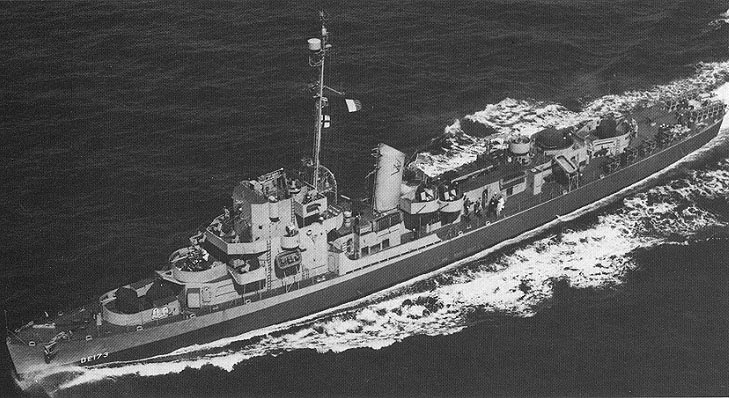
USS Eldridge (DE-173), c. 1944

The Philadelphia Experiment is the name given to a naval military experiment which was supposedly carried out at the Philadelphia Naval Shipyard in Philadelphia, Pennsylvania, sometime around 28 October 1943. It is alleged that the U.S. Navy destroyer escort USS Eldridge was to be rendered invisible (or "cloaked") to enemy devices. The experiment is also referred to as Project Rainbow. Some reports allege that the warship traveled back in time for about 10 seconds; however, popular culture has represented far longer time jumps.

The story is widely regarded as a hoax. The U.S. Navy maintains that no such experiment occurred, and details of the story contradict well-established facts about the Eldridge as well as the known laws of physics.

The Montauk Project was alleged to be a series of secret United States government projects conducted at Camp Hero or Montauk Air Force Station on Montauk, Long Island, for the purpose of exotic research, including time travel. Jacques Vallée describes allegations of the Montauk Project as an outgrowth of stories about the Philadelphia Experiment.

== See also ==
- List of creepypastas
