= The Hole, 309 Days to the Bloodiest Tragedy =

2026 Indonesian horror film

- Teaser poster under name "Bolong"
- Indonesian: Lobang Buaya: 309 Hari Sebelum Tragedi Berdarah
- Directed by: Hanung Bramantyo
- Written by: Hanung Bramantyo
- Produced by: Shierly Kosasih
- Starring: Baskara Mahendra; Carissa Perusset; Khiva Iskak; Anya Zen
- Cinematography: Suadi Utama
- Edited by: Haris F Syah
- Music by: Hariopati Rinanto
- Production company: Adhya Pictures
- Distributed by: EST N8
- Release dates: 3 February 2026 (IFFR); 1 October 2026 (Indonesia)
- Running time: 99 minutes
- Country: Indonesia
- Language: Indonesian

The Hole, 309 Days to the Bloodiest Tragedy (Indonesian: Lobang Buaya: 309 Hari Sebelum Tragedi Berdarah) is a 2026 Horror thriller film written and directed by Hanung Bramantyo. The film, set in 1960s Indonesia, centers on the village of Lubang Buaya, where a series of unexplained murders occur on the 30th of each month. Victims are found with holes and strange messages written on their faces.

The film is inspired by the theories surrounding 30 September Movement of 1965 events at Lubang Buaya, where six army generals were assassinated during a failed military coup. It blends historical references with elements of folklore and the supernatural. It will have its world premiere in the Harbour section at the 55th International Film Festival Rotterdam on 3 February 2026.

== Cast ==
- Baskara Mahendra
- Carissa Perusset
- Khiva Iskak
- Anya Zen

== Production ==
In November 2024 the international finance, production and sales company EST N8 handled the sales of the film at American Film Market after acquiring the world rights.

The film directed by Hanung Bramantyo starring Baskara Mahendra with Carissa Perusset is produced by Adhya Pictures. The film blends the detective thrills of 1995 American crime thriller film Se7en with the horror of 2016 South Korean horror film The Wailing, and 1998 Japanese horror film Ring.

== Release ==
The Hole, 309 Days to the Bloodiest Tragedy had its world premiere at the 55th International Film Festival Rotterdam on 3 February 2026, in Harbour section.
