= Imaginary Friend (film) =

2012 television film

- Written by: Christine Dixon; Brian D. Young
- Directed by: Richard Gabai
- Starring: Lacey Chabert; Ethan Embry; Amanda Schull
- Country of origin: United States
- Original language: English

Production
- Producers: Michael Amato; Richard Gabai
- Cinematography: Scott Peck
- Editor: Jeff Murphy
- Running time: 86 minutes
- Production companies: 180 Degrees; Braeburn Entertainment; Check Entertainment

Original release
- Network: Lifetime
- Release: June 2, 2012

Imaginary Friend is a 2012 Lifetime television movie starring Lacey Chabert, Ethan Embry, Amanda Schull, and Ted McGinley.

== Plot ==
Emma Turner is a talented artist haunted by the presence of a childhood imaginary friend called Lilly, which she created as a way to cope with abuse from her father, who killed her mother before committing suicide. She inherits a fortune in a trust on condition that she remains married. Her psychiatrist husband, Brad, uses this imaginary friend from her childhood to drive her insane so she may be committed to a mental institution, leaving him with free access to her trust without the burden of caring for her. His assistant, Molly, is his mistress and in on the scheme. Brad seems to be a caring husband to everybody, but he lies to Emma's doctor, Dr. Kent, and says Emma hurts herself to have her institutionalized faster. He also has Emma take more and more pills.

Eventually Lilly appears as an adult woman and shows a supportive attitude to Emma, who tries to make her disappear without success. She starts confiding in Lilly and realizes her presence is making her feel better. Brad knows Emma still sees Lilly, even though she denies it, so he speaks with the hospital staff to have Emma institutionalized as soon as possible, and signs a new power from attorney to continue having access to Emma's trust. One night, Emma has prepared dinner and tells Brad she killed Lilly, much to his horror. He interrogates her and asks her how the murder occurred. Brad starts getting paranoid, taking Emma's medication and trying to contact a woman called Brittany, who was one of his patients suffering from dissociative identity disorder two years ago and with whom he had an affair. He calls Brittany, but she never answers her phone; he looks for her at her home, but the landowner explains there is no one with that name living there. Even her file is not in his office.

It is revealed that Brittany was posing as Lilly as part of Brad's scheme, but has turned against him out of sympathy for Emma and begun working with her to make Brad look like the one who needs professional help. Their plan succeeds and Brad gets arrested and committed, freeing Emma from his lies. Brittany and Emma affirm their friendship, promising to be friends forever.

== Cast ==
- Lacey Chabert as Emma Turner
  - Kayla Madison as Young Emma
- Ethan Embry as Brad Turner
- Amanda Schull as Brittany / "Lilly"
  - Mila Brener as Young Lilly
- Ted McGinley as Officer Cameron
- Paul Sorvino as Jonathan
- Jacob Young as Dr. Kent
- Marc McClure as Dr. McQueen
- Sam Page as Robert
- Heather Tom as Grace
- Richard Portnow as Dan
- Angeline-Rose Troy as Molly
- Larry Poindexter as Duane
- Matt Knudsen as Karl
- Deena Dill as Veronica

== Reception ==
One review states, "an expertly built climax and conclusion that make it easy to say you should give it a chance, even if the toned down nature sounds like a deal breaker to you." Radio Times called the film a "seemingly average TV movie transformed by an entertaining climax", noting that the last act was "surprisingly enjoyable".
