= Dutch (1991 film) =

1991 film by Peter Faiman

- Theatrical release poster
- Directed by: Peter Faiman
- Written by: John Hughes
- Produced by: John Hughes; Richard Vane
- Starring: Ed O'Neill; Ethan Randall; JoBeth Williams
- Cinematography: Charles Minsky
- Edited by: Paul Hirsch; Adam Bernardi
- Music by: Alan Silvestri
- Production company: Hughes Entertainment
- Distributed by: 20th Century Fox
- Release date: July 19, 1991
- Running time: 107 minutes
- Country: United States
- Language: English
- Budget: $17 million
- Box office: $4.6 million

Dutch (released as Driving Me Crazy outside the US) is a 1991 American road comedy-drama film directed by Peter Faiman, and written by John Hughes. The film stars Ed O'Neill (in the title role) and Ethan Embry, co-starring JoBeth Williams, Christopher McDonald, Ari Meyers, and E. G. Daily. The original music score was composed by Alan Silvestri.

The film was poorly received critically and was a box-office bomb. O'Neill and Embry would later reunite as Joe Friday and Frank Smith in the 2003 version of the television series Dragnet.

== Plot ==
Dutch Dooley attends a ritzy party with his girlfriend, Natalie Standish. He stands out terribly among the upper-class guests as he makes boorish comments and wears a cheap suit. Natalie's relaxed, less rigid personality also does not fit with the other attendees. Dutch meets Natalie's snobbish, wealthy ex-husband Reed, who tells Natalie that he will have to break his Thanksgiving plans with their son Doyle for an unexpected business trip to London, and that Natalie will have to tell Doyle.

Natalie calls Doyle at his private school in Georgia and invites him home for Thanksgiving, but Doyle refuses the offer; he blames her for the divorce. Despite the refusal, Dutch sees an opportunity to get to know Doyle and further his relationship with Natalie, so he offers to go to Georgia and bring Doyle back to Chicago for the holiday.

Upon arriving in Georgia, Dutch finds Doyle to be much like his father: snobbish, selfish and elitist. Mistakenly believing his father has arrived to retrieve him for Thanksgiving, the boy throws a book at Dutch, hits him with a golf club, kicks him, and shoots him in the groin with a BB gun, for which Dutch promises revenge. Dutch ultimately restrains Doyle and carries him to the car to start their journey to Chicago.

The pair endures several mishaps, including an impromptu fireworks show which ruins Dutch's coat. Later, after Doyle throws a lit cigar in Dutch's lap, Dutch throws Doyle out of the car and makes him walk to their motel. Doyle gets even by parking Dutch's car in the middle of the highway, where it is hit and destroyed by a truck. They hitch a ride with two prostitutes who steal their luggage and Dutch's wallet, leaving them stranded.

Doyle calls his father, whom he discovers has lied about his trip to London; he instead spent the holidays with a girlfriend. Stunned by his father's betrayal, and wounded by Dutch's accusation that Doyle "hates his mother", Doyle begins to regret his callous attitude. Dutch initially relents and wants to call Natalie for assistance, but Doyle refuses and insists on getting home on their own. They sneak a ride on the back of a semi-truck. When they are assaulted by security guards at a trailer drop yard, Doyle brandishes his BB gun and feigns insanity, pretending that voices in his head are telling him to kill the guards, which frightens them enough to allow their escape.

Dutch and Doyle enter a restaurant, where they meet a married couple who take them to a homeless shelter in Hammond, Indiana for the night. At the shelter, Doyle grows fond of a young girl and her family. While becoming acquainted, he finally realizes that he has been neglecting his mother and indeed wants to be with her for the holidays.

On Thanksgiving Day, the family drives Dutch and Doyle to Natalie's home, where Reed is waiting. Dutch explains that he owns a large construction company, and he hires the family's father so they can afford to leave the homeless shelter. Doyle reunites with his mother and reveals to Reed that he knows the truth about his supposed trip to London. When Doyle decides to stay with his mother instead of Reed for Thanksgiving, Reed evicts Natalie from the house, which he owns. Dutch follows Reed outside as he departs and hits Reed. He demands that Reed show more respect to Natalie and become a better father to Doyle, to which a dazed Reed agrees.

As Natalie, Dutch and Doyle sit to begin their Thanksgiving feast, Dutch asks Doyle to retrieve Dutch's coat, as it contains a very special gift for Natalie. As Doyle walks away, Dutch finally claims his revenge by shooting Doyle with his own BB gun.

== Cast ==
- Ed O'Neill as Dutch Dooley
- Ethan Embry as Doyle Standish (credited as Ethan Randall)
- JoBeth Williams as Natalie Standish
- Christopher McDonald as Reed Standish
- E. G. Daily as Halley
- Ari Meyers as Brock
- L. Scott Caldwell as Homeless Woman
- Kathleen Freeman as Gritzi

== Reception ==
=== Critical ===
Dutch received poor reviews from critics. It holds a 17% approval rating on Rotten Tomatoes from 23 reviews, with an average rating of 3.7/10. Audiences polled by CinemaScore gave the film an average grade of "B+" on an A+ to F scale. Critic Roger Ebert, in his one-and-a-half star review of the film, thought that Dutch's screenwriter Hughes was following his own formula, repeating some of his other films, such as Planes, Trains and Automobiles (1987), and cited O'Neill's character as behaving "in defiance of common sense."

Ed O'Neill himself would notably mock the movie as his Married... with Children character Al Bundy, in the show's season 6 episode "England Show" the following year; when complaining about having to take off his shoes briefly in the airport, he jokes "Oh, please- they show us the movie Dutch, and they tell me I STINK?!".

=== Box office ===
The film opened at #10 at the box office and grossed $1,867,201. The film would end with a domestic gross of $4,603,929. It was a box-office bomb, grossing less than $5 million domestically against its $17 million budget.

=== Accolades ===
Year	Nominee / work	Award	Result
1992	Best Young Actor Starring in a Motion Picture - Ethan Embry	Young Artist Award	Won
1992	Best Family Motion Picture - Comedy	Young Artist Award	Nominated

== Home media ==
The film was released on DVD on March 22, 2005, and also was released on Blu-ray on January 17, 2012.
