= Lewis MacDougall =

British actor (born 2002)

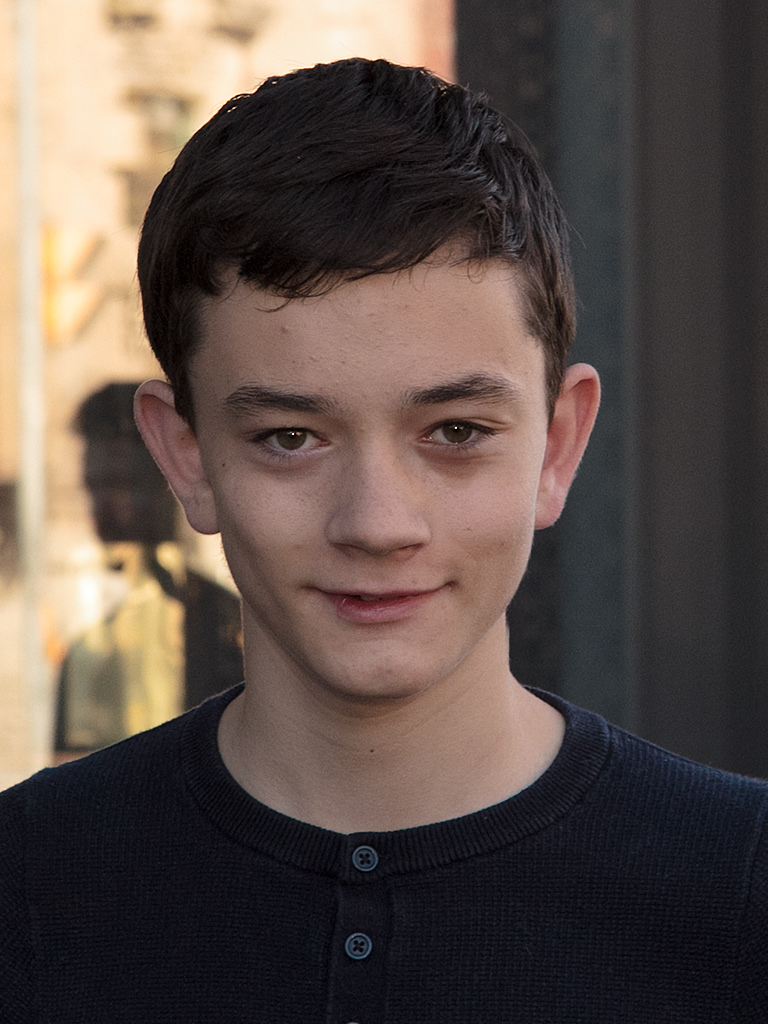
- MacDougall at the Toronto International Film Festival in September 2016
- Born: Lewis John Moir MacDougall; 5 June 2002 (age 24); Edinburgh, Scotland
- Occupation: Actor
- Years active: 2015–present

Lewis John Moir MacDougall (born 5 June 2002) is a Scottish actor. He made his film debut in the fantasy film Pan (2015). He subsequently starred in the fantasy tragedy A Monster Calls (2016), the road trip drama film Boundaries (2018) and The Belly of the Whale (2018).

== Early life ==
MacDougall was brought up in Edinburgh, Scotland, and attended Currie High School. His father is a retired banker. His mother, Fiona, died in December 2013 from multiple sclerosis, and a few weeks after her death Lewis was cast as Nibs in the film Pan. Before his first film he had acted only in small parts at his local drama group, The Drama Studio, which specialised in improvised rather than scripted performances.

== Career ==
MacDougall made his film debut in 2015 as Nibs in Pan, directed by Joe Wright, after attending an open audition in Morningside. In 2016, he starred in A Monster Calls, opposite Felicity Jones and Liam Neeson, and released on 23 December. In the film, a dark fantasy drama, he plays a boy whose mother is dying of a terminal illness, and who begins communicating with a tree monster seemingly living outside his house. On 6 October 2016, MacDougall attended the gala screening for A Monster Calls, at the BFI London Film Festival, where he was interviewed about his role. On 12 December, he appeared on BBC's The One Show, alongside co-star Liam Neeson, where he also talked about the film.

He then co-starred in the road trip comedy-drama Boundaries, opposite Vera Farmiga and Christopher Plummer, which premiered at South by Southwest in March 2018. In 2018 he also appeared as Lewis in the short film Multiplex.

== Filmography ==
Year	Title	Role	Notes
2015	Pan	Nibs	
2016	A Monster Calls	Conor O'Malley	
2018	Boundaries	Henry	
2018	The Belly of the Whale	Joey Moody	
2020	Multiplex	Lewis	Short film
2024	Mearcstapa	Mark	Short film
2025	Bill & Andy's Magical Porcelain Adventure	Bill	Short film
2026	The Fall of Sir Douglas Weatherford †	TBA	Post-production

=== Television ===
Year	Title	Role	Notes
2020	His Dark Materials	Tullio	3 episodes
2025	Shetland	Ethan Stone	
2026	House of the Dragon	Tom Tangletongue	Episodes: "Tumbleton" and "The Dragon in Winter"

== Awards and nominations ==
Year	Award	Category	Nominated work	Result	Ref
2016	Evening Standard British Film Awards	Malone Souliers Award for Breakthrough of the Year	A Monster Calls	Nominated	
2016	Washington D.C. Area Film Critics Association	Best Youth Performance	A Monster Calls	Nominated	
2016	Critics' Choice Movie Awards	Best Young Performer	A Monster Calls	Nominated	
2016	London Critics Circle Film Awards	Young British/Irish Performer of the Year	A Monster Calls	Won	
2016	Phoenix Film Critics Society Awards	Breakthrough Performance / Best Performance by a Youth	A Monster Calls	Nominated	
2016	Las Vegas Film Critics Society	Youth in Film	A Monster Calls	Nominated	
2017	Premios Feroz	Best Main Actor	A Monster Calls	Nominated	
2017	Empire Awards	Best Male Newcomer	A Monster Calls	Nominated	
2017	Saturn Awards	Best Performance by a Younger Actor	A Monster Calls	Nominated	
2017	Online Film & Television Association	Best Youth Performance	A Monster Calls	Nominated	
2017	Young Scot Awards	Entertainment Award	A Monster Calls	Won	
2017	South Bank Sky Arts Award	Times Breakthrough Award	A Monster Calls	Nominated	
