= Boundaries (2018 film) =

- Theatrical release poster
- Directed by: Shana Feste
- Written by: Shana Feste
- Produced by: Brian Kavanaugh-Jones; Chris Ferguson
- Starring: Vera Farmiga; Christopher Plummer; Lewis MacDougall; Bobby Cannavale; Kristen Schaal; Christopher Lloyd; Peter Fonda
- Cinematography: Sara Mishara
- Edited by: Marie-Hélène Dozo; Dorian Harris
- Music by: Michael Penn
- Production companies: Automatik Entertainment; Oddfellows Entertainment; Stage 6 Films
- Distributed by: Sony Pictures Classics (United States); Mongrel Media (Canada)
- Release dates: March 12, 2018 (SXSW); June 22, 2018 (United States); July 6, 2018 (Canada)
- Running time: 104 minutes
- Countries: United States; Canada
- Language: English
- Box office: $703,438

Boundaries is a 2018 comedy-drama film written and directed by Shana Feste, following Laura and her 14-year-old son Henry, who are forced to drive Laura's irresponsible, marijuana-dealing father cross-country after he is thrown out of his nursing home. It stars Vera Farmiga, Christopher Plummer, Lewis MacDougall, Bobby Cannavale, Kristen Schaal, Christopher Lloyd, and Peter Fonda.

The film was produced by Automatik Entertainment. It premiered at South by Southwest on March 12, 2018, and was released in the United States on June 22, 2018, and in Canada on July 6, 2018. It grossed $29,552 during its opening weekend and $755,977 worldwide. This was the final film featuring Fonda to be released during his lifetime.

== Plot ==
Laura Jaconi's therapist works her through trust and abandonment issues, stemming from her father Jack's lifetime of treatment. His lack of respect for her boundaries is problematic, causing her to cope strangely by adopting abandoned pets.

At home there is a motley collection of nine dogs and cats with various maladies. When Jim, a man that single-mom Laura has been seeing, is woken by a cat scratching his face, he breaks it off. Her teenaged son Henry gives him a twisted sketch of how he imagines him naked as a parting gift.

Dropping Henry off at school, Laura asks him to keep out of trouble as she'd rather not deal with the principal again. Arriving late to her work as an executive assistant, her excessively wealthy boss drives her crazy over her daughter's sweet-16 party, as she's nit-picking everything.

After school, Laura does have to meet Henry's principal. Not only has he slapped her as he tried to get back at one of his tormentors, but she found a lewd sketch of herself. He gets expelled, so Laura is given a list of private schools to try.

Desperate, needing to pay for an expensive private school, Laura finally calls back Jack looking for help. He's desperate also, as his home is throwing him out for dealing. They do a trade, he'll help get her the money in exchange for picking him up.

As Laura and Henry head to the home, she calls her sister JoJo in LA, asking her to take in their father. Although not too excited to do it, she says yes so they visit. At the home, Jack shows his grandson the greenhouse holding his huge crop of marijuana, the reason he's being discharged. He then insists Laura drive them in his Rolls under the guise of them spending time together, implying he has stage four cancer.

Laura convinces her workmate Serge to take in five of their dogs and make up a sick leave excuse, in exchange for a future date. The makeshift family with four dogs do a road trip down the coast from Seattle, through Oregon, San Francisco, and LA. Although she wants to drive straight through, Jack reprograms her sat-nav, and they stop at art forger Stan's for the night.

Jack confides in Henry, showing him the trunk holds weed worth 200,000. He confesses he's a low level drug dealer, explaining he needs help to unload it on their route. At dawn, unbeknownst to Laura, Henry helps Jack deliver to a Buddhist colony.

Several stops later, Jack coerces them to stop at Henry's dad Leonard's, who'd abandoned them and divorced Laura three years ago. Henry pretends he wants closure but neither father nor son is interested. Laura sleeps with Leonard, but in the morning realizes that their relationship, or lack thereof, is equally toxic as that of her father. He is not remotely interested in helping with Henry's private schooling. Laura discovers Leonard's remarried and tells Jack, who warns him to stay away from them all, punching him. Leonard retaliates by telling her that Jack's distributing on their way.

Laura finally makes Jack see how much he's hurt her over the years, then proceeds to scatter the remaining bags of product over the asphalt. Just then, a police cruiser approaches, so she frantically retrieves them. Once the officer runs her license, he takes her into the station for over 3,000 in unpaid parking tickets.

Jack's last drop is at his friend Joey's, but before he can leave with the money two black-clad figures burst in, demanding it. Their voice-disguising equipment fails and Joey realises it's his grandson. Laura jumps in behind them with a bow and arrow, scaring them off.

Finally arriving to JoJo's, Jack is underwhelmed, although the evening ends well. By morning he has left with the car, however left a large amount of money for the private school. Laura, Henry and five dogs, one which they adopted on the trip, head back to Seattle by bus.

In Seattle, checking in with Serge, Laura confirms their Friday date, then she and Henry arrive home. Jack surprises them with yet another stray, announcing he's there to stay and plans to change.

== Cast ==
- Vera Farmiga as Laura Jaconi, Henry's mother
- Christopher Plummer as Jack Jaconi, Laura's father
- Lewis MacDougall as Henry, Laura and Leonard's son
- Bobby Cannavale as Leonard, Laura's ex-husband and Henry's father
- Kristen Schaal as JoJo Jaconi, Laura's sister
- Peter Fonda as Joey
- Christopher Lloyd as Stanley
- Dolly Wells as Sofia
- Yahya Abdul-Mateen II as Serge
- Ryan Robbins as Jim
- Chelah Horsdal as Therapist
- Jill Teed as Principal Mueller
- Diana Bang as Fortune Teller
- Emily Holmes as Over Tired Mom
- Jessica McLeod as True
- Halldor Kenneth Bjarnason as Jed; Stanley's son
- Rohan Campbell as Mikey
- Elizabeth Bowen as Griselda
- James Kirk as Jimmy

== Production ==
=== Development ===
In April 2016, it was announced that Vera Farmiga and Christopher Plummer would portray lead roles in the drama film Boundaries, with Shana Feste directing from her own screenplay. Brian Kavanaugh-Jones and Bailey Conway were reported to be producing under the American production company Automatik Entertainment, with Chris Ferguson and Kenneth Burke producing under the Canadian production company Oddfellows Entertainment. In May 2016, Lewis MacDougall, Bobby Cannavale, Kristen Schaal, Peter Fonda, Christopher Lloyd, and Dolly Wells were also cast in the film.

=== Filming ===
Principal photography began on May 2, 2016 in Vancouver, British Columbia, and was completed on June 3, 2016.

== Music ==
In February 2017, it was reported that Michael Penn would compose the film's score.

== Release ==
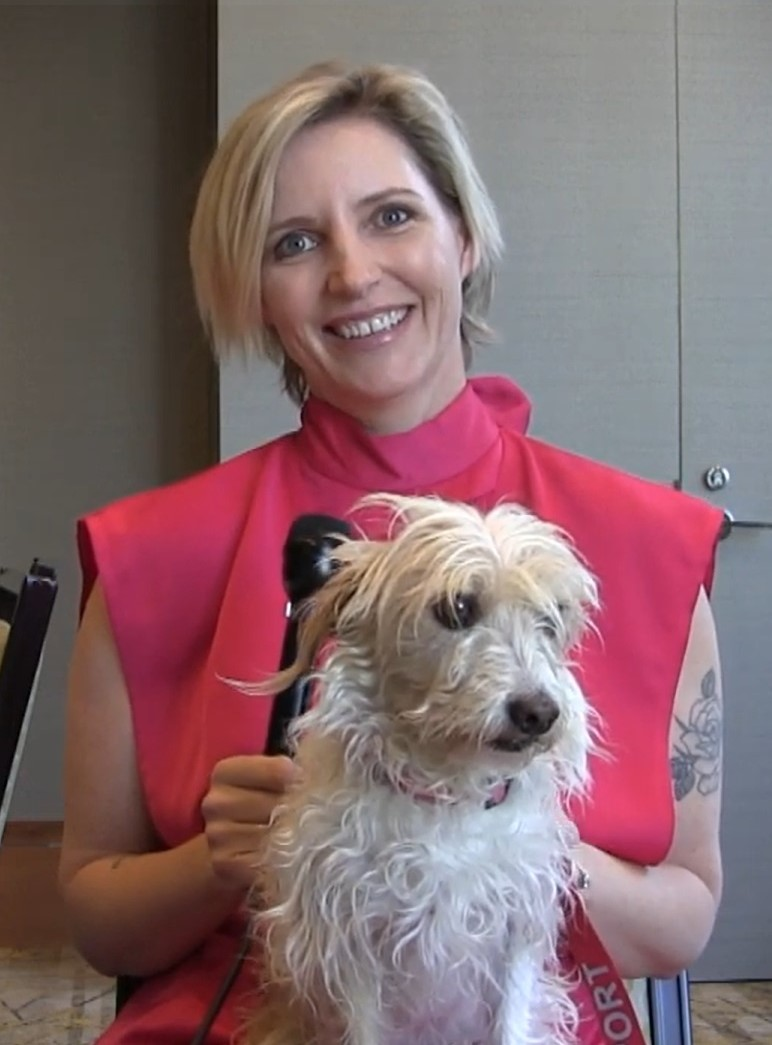
Director and screenwriter Shana Feste, with dog, interviewed about Boundaries in 2018

In May 2016, Stage 6 Films acquired worldwide distribution rights to the film. Sony Pictures Classics distributed the film in the United States. Boundaries had its world premiere at South by Southwest on March 12, 2018. It was released in the United States on June 22, 2018.

=== Peter Fonda controversy ===
On June 20, 2018, Sony Pictures Classics condemned comments Peter Fonda made about President Donald Trump's young son Barron on Twitter the previous day, but announced that they would not edit the film or change its release schedule, noting that Fonda "plays a very minor role."

== Reception ==
=== Box office ===
Boundaries made $29,995 from five theaters in its opening weekend, for an average of $5,910 per venue. Deadline Hollywood called it a "moderate start" while LifeZette called the film a "flop" and in-part blamed Fonda's association.

=== Critical response ===
On Rotten Tomatoes, the film has an approval rating of 49% based on 77 reviews, with an average rating of 5.2/10. The website's critical consensus reads, "Boundaries benefits from a stellar performance by the reliably excellent Christopher Plummer, but his work is overwhelmed by the mediocre movie that surrounds it." On Metacritic, the film has a weighted average score of 50 out of 100, based on 24 critics, indicating "mixed or average" reviews.
