= Direct-to-video =

Specific film distribution method

Direct-to-video, straight-to-video, direct-to-disc (D2D) or direct-to-DVD refers to the release of a film or television series on any kind of hard copy formats for strictly private residential viewing without an initial theatrical release or television premiere. This distribution strategy was prevalent before streaming platforms came to dominate the TV and movie distribution markets.

Because sequels or prequels of larger-budget films may be released direct-to-video, review references to direct-to-video releases are often pejorative. Direct-to-video release has also become profitable for independent filmmakers and smaller companies. Some direct-to-video genre films (with a high-profile star) can generate well in excess of $50 million revenue worldwide.

== History ==
The first direct-to-video release to go into production was E. Nick: A Legend in His Own Mind (1984), produced by CineTel Films, and directed by Robert Hegyes.

Hollywood realized that the video shelf was its own marketplace.... And [it would] eventually become today's streaming economy

== Reasons for releasing direct to video ==
The direct-to-video action movie is easy to spot on store shelves because it usually has "Dead," "Death," "Future" or "Blood" in its title. The cover of the video box habitually features a rugged man snuggling some sort of semi-automatic weapon amid a backdrop of high-tech destruction.
The plots are virtually interchangeable: Tough cop tracks down brutal serial killer; tough FBI or DEA agent battles South American drug kingpins; tough CIA agent takes on Middle Eastern terrorists; tough cyborg cop squares off with sadistic cyborg villain in the 25th Century. In short, bargain-basement Schwarzenegger.

— Chicago Tribune, 1994

A production studio may decide not to generally release a TV show or film for several possible reasons: a low budget, a lack of support from a TV network, negative reviews, its controversial nature, that it may appeal to a small niche market, or a simple lack of general public interest. Studios, limited in the annual number of films to which they grant cinematic releases, may choose to pull the completed film from the theaters, or never exhibit it in theaters at all. Studios then generate revenue through video sales and rentals. Direct-to-video films are marketed mostly through colorful box covers, instead of advertising, and are not covered by publications like Leonard Maltin's Movie Guide.

Direct-to-video releases have historically carried a stigma of lower technical or artistic quality than theatrical releases. Some films released direct-to-video are films which have been completed but were never released in movie theaters. This delay often occurs when a studio doubts a film's commercial prospects to justify a full cinema release or because its release window has closed. In film industry slang, such films are referred to as having been vaulted. Like B-movies shown in drive-in theaters in the mid-20th century, direct-to-video films employ both former stars and young actors who may become stars later.

Direct-to-video releases can be done for films which cannot be shown theatrically due to controversial content, or because the cost involved in a theatrical release is beyond the releasing company.

Animated sequels and feature-length episodes of animated series are also often released in this fashion. The first feature length animated film to be released direct-to-video in the United States was Tiny Toon Adventures: How I Spent My Vacation in 1992. The practice of creating and releasing regular fiction specifically for video did not really take off until 1994, with Disney's The Return of Jafar and Universal's The Land Before Time II: The Great Valley Adventure, neither of which was intended to hit theaters at any point in its production. Several of the animated sequels based on theatrical canon films, like MGM's The Secret of NIMH 2: Timmy to the Rescue from 1998, have sparked criticism due to the deliberate neglect of the original source material by basic storyline focuses as production of these types will eventually decrease as some, like Universal's Balto II: Wolf Quest, have dealt with distribution challenges, causing them to be delayed until further notice, or otherwise releasing them in incorrect order. Films based on long-time franchises will remain continuous since they became more successful, like Scooby-Doo for instance (their video debut Scooby-Doo on Zombie Island became one of the best-selling DTV films of all time).

By 1994, an average of six new direct-to-video films appeared each week. Erotic thrillers and R-rated action films were the two most successful genres. Family films became more important than such genres later in the 1990s, as retailers stocked more copies of blockbuster films instead of more titles. According to the Los Angeles Times:

Often, the downfall of live-action family films at the box office is their strength on video. Their appeal is to families with young children, who may go to only a couple of movies per year but who will watch many videos multiple times. The teens and young adults who drive blockbuster box office statistics stay away from family movies.

Some horror films that are unsuccessful in theaters, like Witchcraft, begin successful direct-to-video series. Studios may also release sequels or spin-offs to a successful live action film straight to DVD, due to a lack of budget in comparison to the original.

== Pornography ==
During the Golden Age of Porn in the 1970s, many pornographic films were released in theaters, some of which became some of the highest-grossing films in their release years, and in the pornography industry altogether. Toward the 1980s, porn began to shift to video release, because video allowed the producers to work on extremely low budgets and dispense with some film production elements, like scripts, and the increased privacy and convenience of the format change were preferred by the target market. During the late 1990s and onward, pornographers began releasing content on the Internet.

== Physical format releases ==
=== Direct-to-video films screened theatrically ===
Occasionally, a studio that makes a movie that was prepared as a direct-to-video film will release it theatrically at the last minute due to the success of another film with a similar subject matter or an ultimate studio decision. Batman: Mask of the Phantasm is an example of this. However, despite the movie's critically acclaimed success, its box-office performance was very poor, which has been attributed to the last minute nature of its theatrical release. The film had much better commercial success in its subsequent home video releases.

Other times, a direct-to-video movie may get a limited theatrical screening in order to build excitement for the actual release of the video such as was done for 2010's Justice League: Crisis on Two Earths, and Planet Hulk, 2016's Batman: The Killing Joke or 2013's Sharknado. In some cases, other direct-to-video films can also be theatrically released in other countries for similar reasons, such as maximizing revenue in markets with less competition, combat piracy by offering legal access earlier, and leverage specific genre popularity. Additionally, these films may be used to build international hype or, in some cases, to fulfill local distributor demand for new content.

=== Direct-to-disc or DVD premiere ===
As DVDs gradually replaced VHS videocassettes, the term direct-to-DVD replaced direct-to-video in some instances. However, the word video does not necessarily refer to videocassettes. Many publications continue to use the term direct-to-video for DVDs or Blu-rays. Both disc-based release types may also be referred to as direct-to-disc. A new term sometimes used is DVD premiere, abbreviated as DVDP. Such films can cost as little as $20 million, about a third of the average cost of a Hollywood release. According to Variety, American Pie Presents: Band Camp sold more than one million copies in a week.

Some direct-to-DVD releases recently have tended to feature actors who were formerly bankable stars. In 2005, salaries for some of these direct-to-DVD actors in the multimillion-dollar range from $2 to $4 million (Jean-Claude Van Damme) and $4.5 to $10 million (Steven Seagal), in some cases exceeding the actors' theatrical rates.

== Digital releases ==
With the increasing prominence of digital distribution platforms in the 2000s and 2010s, direct-to-digital or direct-to-demand releases (also known as straight-to-digital or straight-to-demand) began to emerge alongside, or in lieu of home video. In November 2007, Ed Burns' Purple Violets became the first film to premiere exclusively for sale online on iTunes Store, being exclusive to the platform for a month. It had premiered at the Tribeca Film Festival in April, where it was reviewed positively, but only received modest distribution offers. At the time, it was not very common for consumers to make digital movie purchases.

As part of a push by the service towards original content, the subscription video on demand service Netflix began to acquire feature films for distribution on its service in the 2010s, including the 2013 documentary The Square and its first feature film in 2015, Beasts of No Nation. Netflix pursued a simultaneous release strategy for its films, partnering with a distributor for a limited theatrical release (in order to maintain eligibility for awards requiring theatrical release, such as the Academy Awards) simultaneous with their availability to subscribers. As this practice violates the traditional release windows mandated by the cinema industry, major chains have typically declined to screen the films. Since 2018, Netflix has partially backpedaled from this strategy, giving its films a one-month theatrical run before their premiere on the Netflix service.

Unique circumstances have also resulted in direct-to-digital releases, sometimes alongside a limited theatrical release; the 2014 film The Interview was released simultaneously on digital and at selected cinemas, after major chains dropped the film due to terrorist threats by a hacking group believed to have ties to North Korea (whose regime is satirized in the film). The group had also leaked confidential data from the internal servers of the film's distributor, Sony Pictures.

The COVID-19 pandemic resulted in worldwide closures of cinemas due to economic restrictions and guidance against public gatherings, which prompted direct-to-digital releases for several major films; the Chinese film Lost in Russia was acquired by ByteDance for 630 million yuan (almost 100 million in US dollars) and streamed on its platforms (including TikTok) for free in lieu of a theatrical release, as part of a larger relationship with the company and the film's distributor Huanxi Media. A number of U.S. films were shifted directly to video-on-demand rentals in lieu of a theatrical release, while some have been sold directly to subscription services, including Disney+, HBO Max, Netflix, and Amazon Prime Video.

== OVA and V-Cinema in Japan ==
OV (original video) are movies made for direct-to-video release in the Japanese market. OVA (original video animation) is distinguished from OVM (original video movies) or V-Cinema, which usually refer to non-animated works. Different production studios may use other labels like V drama.

The OVA market developed in the mid-1980s. It appealed to filmmakers because it allowed them to include more controversial, sexual, violent, or political content in comparison to broadcast television, due to the lax censorship and lack of need rely on sponsored advertisements for financial support. The market continued to expand during the Japanese asset price bubble, and began to decline with the collapse of the bubble in the late 1980s and early 1990s.

With the rise of VHS home video and the decline of the Japanese economy in the late 1980s, film studios struggled to recoup investments on big-budget films. (See Cinema of Japan) Inspired by the success of OVAs, Toei released the first film in its V-Cinema line, Crime Hunter, in March 1989. Following Toei's success, other studios began to release a slew of direct-to-video movies, often under lines with similar names such as V-Picture, V-Feature and V-Movie. Despite V-Cinema originally being simply the name of Toei's line of direct-to-video release, in Japan it came to refer to all Japanese direct-to-video film releases, regardless of which studio released them or what line they were part of.

Relaxed censorship in V-Cinema gave way to the premier and rise of expressive auteur directors such as Takashi Miike, Hideo Nakata, Shinji Aoyama, and Kiyoshi Kurosawa. As the release of these titles were outside of usual distribution, studios and directors worked quickly to capitalize on niche markets or upcoming and current trends to increase financial returns. This period of history in Japanese cinema has been described by film journalist Tom Mes as "a far more diverse and vibrant film scene [than previous eras]". By 1995, the V-Cinema industry was in decline, but the explosion in quantity and variety of such movies established and cemented genres like J-horror and yakuza films.

The success of OVAs and V-Cinema has resulted in less stigma regarding direct-to-video releases in Japan than in western markets. While there are still OVA and V-Cinema releases, the market is considerably smaller than it was in the 1980s and 1990s.

== Online Big Movies in China ==
In the mid-to-late 2010s, low-budget B-movies that are made exclusively for digital streaming became a trend in China; these films are called Online Big Movies (OBM; 网络大电影 in Chinese, or simply 网大). The word big in the name was meant to be sardonic, as most of these films are often made on a very low budget and featuring mostly unknown cast members and sometimes nonprofessional actors. However, increasingly, the budget for these films have been slowly climbing up, due to the success of these films on digital distribution platforms; the budget for these films can now range from less than 1 million yuan to upwards of 10 or 20 million yuan. Although these Online Big Movies rarely feature well-known actors, in recent years, many Online Big Movies have hired veteran actors from Hong Kong action cinema and Taiwanese cinema to join its cast. These movies are also to be differentiated from films that are made for theatrical release but were later acquired by digital streaming services, in that these Online Big Movies are produced by internet companies with the sole intent of digital release.

In additional to the digital distribution of these films in China, many of the Online Big Movies have also been released on digital platforms outside of China, such as on YouTube. Several YouTube channels, such as Q1Q2 Movie Channel Official and YOUKU MOVIE are popular channels that distributes these Online Big Movies.

== See also ==
- List of animated direct-to-video series
- B movie
- First run film
- First-run syndication
- Shot-on-video film
- Television film
- Video on demand
