= Crime Hunter =

- Directed by: Shundō Ōkawa (Note: Shundō Ōkawa was previously known as Toshimichi Ōkawa.)
- Produced by: Kazuo Kato; Tōru Yoshida; Katsuhiko Takei
- Cinematography: Yōsuke Mamiya
- Edited by: Fumio Soda
- Music by: Seiichi Kyōda
- Release date: March 10, 1989 (Japan)
- Running time: 60 minutes
- Country: Japan
- Language: Japanese
- Budget: ¥60 million US$460,000

Crime Hunter (Japanese: クライムハンター 怒りの銃弾, Hepburn: Kuraimuhanta Ikari no Judan), also known as Crimehunter – Bullet of Fury, is a 1989 Japanese original video action film, which was the first in Toei's V-Cinema line. Directed by Shundō Okawa, it was released on March 10, 1989.

== Plot ==
Joe and Ahiru , police detectives in Little Tokyo, arrive at a scene in order to catch Bruce Yamamoto, who has stolen five million dollars from a Church. They capture Bruce, but as they are driving back to the station, they are ambushed by a gang. In the ensuing shootout, Joe is injured and hospitalised, Ahiru is killed, and Bruce escapes.

Joe leaves the police in order to pursue Ahiru's killers. After investigating some leads, he meets with Lily, a nun from the church that Bruce robbed, who wants to get the money back.

Later, Bruce kidnaps Lily and tells Joe to meet him in an abandoned warehouse. Bruce retrieves the stolen money, bringing Lily along with him. He then kills two members of the gang that killed Ahiru, and who were also going to kill Bruce in order to take the money for themselves. It transpires that this gang is in fact members of the former police force of Ahiru and Joe. Joe and Bruce then team up to kill the rest of the members. Bruce dies in the shootout.

As Lily and Joe are getting ready to leave, Hunt, the police officer who took over the case from Joe, appears and shoots Lily dead. Joe manages to kill Hunt and the film ends as Joe carries Lily's body away from the warehouse.

== Cast ==
- Masanori Sera as Joe Kawamura
- Minako Tanaka as Lily
- Riki Takeuchi as Ahiru
- Ryuji Katagiri
- Seiji Matano as Bruce Yamamoto
- Keishi Hunt as Hunt
- Yoshio Harada

== Reception ==
On Midnight Eye, Tom Mes said that "thanks to giving the Japanese film industry a much-needed shot in the arm by kick-starting the V-cinema movement, [the film] holds undeniable historical value".

== Sequels ==
The film was followed in the same year with Crime Hunter 2 (Kuraimuhantā 2 uragiri no jūdan), which was also directed by Ōkawa, and Crime Hunter 3 (Kuraimuhantā 3 minagoroshi no jūdan) in 1990.
