= The Gymnast (2026 film) =

2026 American drama film

- Directed by: Charlotte Glynn
- Written by: Charlotte Glynn
- Produced by: Ricky Tollman; Luke Spears
- Starring: Ethan Embry; Margarita Levieva; Britney Wheeler; Will Mossek
- Cinematography: Kayla Hoff
- Edited by: Lia Kulakauskas
- Production company: Hot Rod
- Release date: January 30, 2026 (IFFR)
- Running time: 84 minutes
- Country: United States
- Language: English

The Gymnast is a 2026 American drama film written and directed by Charlotte Glynn, in her directorial debut. It stars Ethan Embry, Margarita Levieva, Britney Wheeler and Will Mossek.

It had its world premiere at the 55th International Film Festival Rotterdam.

== Premise ==
A gymnast and her father fight to reinvent themselves after a possible career ending injury.

== Cast ==
- Ethan Embry as Rich
- Margarita Levieva as Stephanie
- Britney Wheeler as Monica
- Will Mossek as Mike
- Cotter Smith as Dr. Sherman

== Production ==
In December 2023, it was announced Ethan Embry and Margarita Levieva had joined the cast of the film, with Charlotte Glynn directing from a screenplay she wrote.

Principal photography began in November 2023 and concluded December 2023 in Pittsburgh.

The film participated in the Los Cabos International Film Festival Films in Development section, Sundance Catalyst, and the IFP Project Forum. Additional funds for the film were raised via Kickstarter.

== Release ==
The Gymnast had its world premiere at the 55th International Film Festival Rotterdam on January 30, 2026.
