= Pellegrino Ernetti =

Italian Catholic priest and musicologist

- Born: 13 October 1925; Rocca Santo Stefano, Rome, Kingdom of Italy
- Died: 8 April 1994 (aged 68); San Giorgio Maggiore, Venice, Italy
- Occupations: Benedictine priest, musicologist
- Known for: Studies of archaic music; Chronovisor claims

Pellegrino Ernetti (13 October 1925 – 8 April 1994) was an Italian Catholic Benedictine priest, musicologist and physicist. Specialising in Gregorian chant and archaic music, he was a lecturer, director of choirs, and author. He conducted laboratory research on sound, and attracted attention for claiming to have invented a device that could observe past events including the Crucifixion of Jesus Christ and a speech by Cicero.

== Early life and education ==
Ernetti was born on 13 October 1925. He entered the Benedictine Abbey of San Giorgio Maggiore in Venice in 1941, and undertook a traditional monastic education that included theology, philosophy, church history, and classical languages such as Latin and Greek, alongside musical training consistent with Benedictine liturgical traditions. He was ordained a priest on 14 August 1949.

== Academic career and musicological work ==
Ernetti developed a reputation as a specialist in Gregorian chant and archaic music. He directed the choir of the Benedictine Abbey of San Giorgio Maggiore, as well as several other choirs, with an emphasis on Gregorian chant. Many recordings were made under his direction. He was appointed full-time lecturer in archaic music at the Benedetto Marcello Conservatory of Music in Venice in 1960. Beginning in 1958, he published the multi-volume Trattato generale di canto gregoriano(Gregorian Chant: A General Treatise) under the auspices of the Cini Foundation's Institute for Cultural Collaboration. The series systematises historical, theoretical, and practical aspects of the chant tradition.

In the early 1950s, he collaborated with Franciscan physician Agostino Gemelli, founder of the Catholic University of Milan, on research into music and acoustics. They worked in a physics laboratory equipped with oscilloscopes, filtering systems, and other electronic instruments, and focused on improving the clarity of sung vocals. Ernetti authored several works on music, including Principi filosofici e teologici della musica (Philosophical and Theological Principles of Music), and Parola, Musica, Ritmo (Words, Music, Rhythm), focusing on the theoretical, philosophical, and practical aspects of music and its performance.

In the 1970s, Ernetti took an interest in Patriarchal chant. He argued that the Patriarchal chant of Venice is an original liturgical musical tradition, independent of Gregorian, Ambrosian, or Aquileian chant. He limited the term patriarchal to the Venetian oral tradition, while ethnomusicologists have applied it more broadly to Carnic and Friulian repertoires.

== Chronovisor and time‑travel claims ==
In 1972, Ernetti claimed to have created a time machine capable of observing and recording past events. He said the "Chronovisor" was developed over several years through the collaboration of twelve scientists, three of whom he identified by name: himself, Agostino Gemelli, and Wernher von Braun. Ernetti asserted that he had used the Chronovisor to observe the Crucifixion of Jesus Christ, to view a performance of the lost Latin tragedy Thyestes by Quintus Ennius, and to listen to a speech of the Roman politician and orator Cicero. He presented a photograph that he claimed depicted Jesus Christ during the Crucifixion, as well as a text he said reproduced the lost play. The photograph was later identified as an image of a wooden sculpture of Christ by Coullaut Valera, while the text is regarded by scholars as a modern composition, likely created by Ernetti himself. Ernetti's claims for the Chronovisor are generally regarded as pseudoscientific.

== Later life and legacy ==
Ernetti remains recognised for his contributions to musicology and sacred music performance. He authored numerous books on archaic music and is a prominent figure in historically informed performance and in the revival of early music in Italy.

In a deathbed confession Ernetti said the text he had claimed to be ancient was assembled by him using fragments from works of ancient authors. He also admitted that the image of Christ was fabricated. He said:

"I was hopeful that my Chronovisor would work. I was always so optimistic."

Ernetti died in Venice on 8 April 1994.

== Sources ==
- Krassa, Peter (2000). Father Ernetti’s Chronovisor: The Creation and Disappearance of the World’s First Time Machine. New Paradigm Books.
- Ladous, Régis (2003). "Voix et images d'ailleurs. Les deux fables de dom Ernetti". Ethnologie française. 37 (2). Presses Universitaires de France: 601–609. ISBN 2-13-053402-3. ISSN 0046-2616.
- di Paoli Paulovich, D. (2020). "A seicento anni dalla fine del Patriarcato di Aquileia (1420‑2020)". HRČAK – Portal of Croatian Scientific Journals. HRČAK: 173–211.
