= Thyestes (Euripides) =

Lost tragedy by Euripides

Thyestes (Ancient Greek: Θυέστης) is a lost tragedy by Euripides. The play may have concerned the myth of Thyestes' seduction of Aerope, the wife of his brother Atreus, and Atreus' subsequent revenge on Thyestes, killing his children and serving them to him at a feast.

== Translations and Editions ==
- Euripides, Fragments: Aegeus-Meleager, edited and translated by Christopher Collard and Martin Cropp, Loeb Classical Library No. 504, Cambridge, Massachusetts, Harvard University Press, 2008. ISBN 978-0-674-99625-0. Online version at Harvard University Press. pp. 428–437.
- Tragicorum Graecorum fragmenta. 2a ed., vol. 5: Euripides ed. E. C. Kopff. Goettingae 2004.
