= Blue Peter pets =

Animals that appeared regularly on children's show Blue Peter

The Blue Peter pets are animals that regularly appear on the long-running BBC children's television series Blue Peter. For 27 years, when not on TV, these pets were often looked after by Blue Peter's long-standing pet keeper Edith Menezes, who died in 1994. The exceptions were the dogs Petra, Shep and Goldie, who lived with Peter Purves, John Noakes and Simon Groom, respectively, for which the three presenters were paid a stipend for their upkeep.

The first pet was a dog named Petra in 1962, and since then there have been several dogs, cats, tortoises, parrots, and horses. The current animals on the show are Shelley the tortoise and Henry the beagle. Rags, a pony, named by viewers, was purchased with the proceeds of a Christmas appeal in the late 1970s as a Riding for the Disabled horse. The Blue Peter parrot—Joey, and one successor, Barney—featured in the 1960s, but when Barney, a blue-fronted amazon, died, he was not replaced.

In a 1986 documentary shown on BBC2 as part of the Did You See...? series, former presenter Peter Purves recalled that Biddy Baxter, the show's editor, had called him in floods of tears on the day that the first parrot Joey died. He went on to muse in the same interview that had he himself died, Baxter would have been far less upset. The original ideas behind featuring the programme's pets were to teach viewers who had animals of their own how to look after them, and for the creatures to act as surrogate pets for those that did not own any. For example, dog training items, tortoise hibernation, and cat care are often featured on the programme. In addition, dogs that lived with the presenters often accompanied them on filming assignments.

== Dogs ==
=== Petra ===
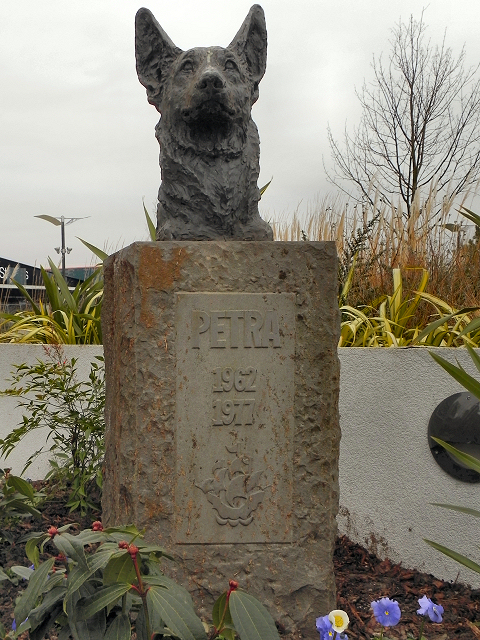
The bronze bust of Petra at the north east corner of the Blue Peter Garden

Petra (4 November 1962 – 14 September 1977) was a female mongrel that appeared on Blue Peter between 1962 and 1977. Petra was the first Blue Peter pet, and remains one of the best known. Up to May 2011, Petra is the longest-serving Blue Peter pet.

She was weighed on one of the episodes and found to weigh about 2 stone (28 lb; 13 kg). She had several puppies, including Patch, who also became a Blue Peter pet, and who predeceased her. Petra lost her teeth at an early age, but this was not necessarily a bad thing; Blue Peter presenter Peter Purves once said that she was often bad-tempered and would "gum you to death" if she had the chance.

On 16 November 1967, when Purves started working on Blue Peter, because Petra took to him, he became Petra's handler on set. Petra had already been on the show for about five years. Petra was an irritable nervous dog on set, so Biddy Baxter had the idea that Purves should be Petra's permanent keeper; he looked after her at home, too. He became fond of Petra and was sad when she died, having been her owner for more than nine years.

There is a bust of Petra in the Blue Peter garden, which was put up on 23 March 1978, during Purves's last show. It originally stood in front of BBC Television Centre but was moved to the garden in 1984 due to redevelopment works and now stands in the current garden at MediaCityUK.

It was later revealed that the original (unnamed) puppy had died of distemper a few days after her first appearance on Blue Peter, broadcast just before Christmas 1962. Instead of informing viewers, and feeling there was no need to upset children needlessly, the programme's director and producer Edward Barnes and Biddy Baxter bought a similar-looking replacement puppy, which was subsequently named Petra by the viewers.

=== Patch ===
Patch (9 September 1965 – 21 May 1971) was looked after by presenter John Noakes after Noakes joined the programme in December 1965. Patch had a distinctive marking around one of his eyes, giving him his name. Patch was often was known for being excitable and for ripping Tony Hicks's trousers. Patch died in May 1971.

=== Shep ===
Shep (1 May 1971 – 17 January 1987), a Border Collie, was bought by the BBC to replace Patch, one of Petra's puppies, born in 1965. He became the main Blue Peter dog when Petra died in 1977. Shep was bred by Audrey Wickham (née Hart), breeder of a number of notable pedigree border collies in the Sadghyl line. He is remembered by viewers as being inseparable from Blue Peter presenter John Noakes. Shep was excitable, and Noakes would often have to restrain him. Noakes's common refrain, "Get down, Shep!", became a catchphrase, and The Barron Knights released a song with that title. Shep left Blue Peter when Noakes departed in June 1978.

Shep also appeared with Noakes in six series of Go With Noakes, from 1976 to 1980. Noakes left Blue Peter on 26 June 1978 and the BBC offered to let him keep Shep, as the dog had lived with him since his TV debut. Despite Shep living with Noakes, the dog was always legally owned by the BBC and in rules that also applied to himself whilst under contract to the BBC, he could not use Shep for advertising or commercial purposes. Noakes was paid a stipend to cover all Shep's costs from the Blue Peter budget (as was Peter Purves for Petra and later Simon Groom for Goldie) and as part of the agreement to keep Shep after leaving the show, Noakes agreed to the no-advertising condition to remain.

Shortly after Noakes left the show he was furious to discover that what he called his "dog money" ceased to be paid and he confronted Biddy Baxter in a phone call. Baxter was adamant that since Shep had left Blue Peter, the programme should no longer be responsible for any of Shep's costs, although she did sympathise with some of his argument and felt that the BBC should pay Noakes for Shep to appear in Go With Noakes or for 'personal appearances' the dog made. Regardless, she later wrote that Noakes was too angry to discuss the matter and the two rarely spoke again. Soon after this angry confrontation, Noakes relinquished Shep, who went to live with Edith Menezes. Noakes subsequently appeared in a series of television advertisements for Spillers "Choice Cuts" dog food, using a dog that was indistinguishable from Shep but named Skip. The subterfuge led to a deeper rift between Noakes and Baxter. Shep died on 17 January 1987.

=== Goldie ===
Goldie (1978–1992) was a female Golden Retriever dog who appeared on Blue Peter from 1978 to 1986. She was owned by presenter Simon Groom. She made her first appearance on the show on 15 May 1978 (same day as Simon Groom) when she was 7 weeks and 5 days old, as a puppy and was named by viewers of Blue Peter. She went on to appear with eight other presenters and began the long list of golden retrievers to appear on the show. Goldie had two litters of puppies and in early 1986, Goldie went on to have puppies and one of them, Bonnie, went on to become a Blue Peter dog after Goldie left. She left along with Simon Groom later that year and lived to 14. Goldie is buried on Groom's farm in Derbyshire. She is also featured as the mascot for UK Gold and featured on idents which were kept until 1993.

=== Bonnie ===
Bonnie (3 February 1986 – 17 April 2001) was a female Golden Retriever dog who appeared on Blue Peter in the late 1980s and 1990s. She was the daughter of Goldie, and succeeded her mother as the Blue Peter dog. Bonnie appeared in 1,150 editions of the programme, alongside 16 different presenters; she had a close bond with presenter Anthea Turner. She retired in 1999 to live with Leonie Pocock, her off-screen owner. Bonnie died aged 15, in 2001.

=== Mabel ===
Mabel (August 1995 – 4 May 2011) was a Blue Merle Border Collie and was Blue Peter's second-longest-serving dog after Petra, being on the show for more than 14 years. Mabel was rescued by the RSPCA who found her in South East London in 1996. She was about six months old when she joined Blue Peter. Her name was derived from the label on her RSPCA kennel, MAB1. Mabel was noticeable for having heterochromatic eyes (one blue and one brown) and distinctive ears. She joined the programme in February 1996 and introduced by Katy Hill. As Mabel's exact date of birth is unknown, her birthday was celebrated on 3 February, the same day as former Blue Peter dog Bonnie. On 10 March 2010 it was announced that Mabel would be retiring from the show after 14 years. Mabel retired on 30 March 2010 (Hill returned for her retirement), and died on 4 May 2011 at the age of 15.

=== Lucy ===
Lucy (14 September 1998 – 4 April 2011) was a Blue Peter pet for 12 years. A pedigree Golden Retriever, she was born to Laytoncroft India of Highbrae (mother) and Lilling Dessie (father). She was introduced by Simon Thomas in 1999. She once wandered into Paul O'Grady's dressing room and was scared off by his dog. On 4 April 2011, it was announced that Lucy had died, aged 12.

=== Meg ===
Meg (6 December 2000 – 15 June 2011) was a Border Collie who belonged to presenter Matt Baker. Whilst not considered an official Blue Peter pet, as she lived with Baker's family in County Durham and was trained as a sheepdog, she frequently appeared on the show alongside Baker during his tenure as a Blue Peter presenter. Her highlights whilst on the show included demonstrating her sheepdog skills and giving birth to a litter of puppies. Meg left with Matt Baker in 2006, but also appeared in other television programmes he has been involved in, including the BBC's 2007 coverage of Crufts and Countryfile. There is also a model of Meg at the Jorvik Centre in York, made from a cast of the pet. Meg died on 15 June 2011 aged 10; she was the first Blue Peter dog whose death was not mentioned on the programme.

=== Barney ===
Barney (December 2008 -) was believed to have been an Irish Setter/Dachshund cross and officially joined the Blue Peter team on 22 September 2009 when he was around 9 months old when he joined. He was the show's ninth dog. Barney is a former stray and was given to presenter Helen Skelton by the Dogs Trust. Barney left the show along with his owner Helen on 26 September 2013.

=== Henry ===
Henry (19 February 2017 – present), a beagle/Basset Hound cross, made his first appearance on the show on 4 April 2019 and is the current Blue Peter dog. He was rescued from the Dogs Trust when he was two years old, and is owned by a member of the Blue Peter production team.

=== Guide dogs: Honey, Cindy, Button, Prince, Magic and Iggy ===
The programme has had a long association with guide dogs, which stretches back to 1964—captivating millions of viewers and helping to transform the lives of thousands of visually impaired people. The first Blue Peter guide dog puppy was Honey, whose training was charted by Valerie Singleton on the programme in 1964. Since then there has been Cindy, who was puppy walked by Peter Purves in 1968; Buttons, who was featured in the 1975, Prince, a son of Goldie, whose training was followed by Peter Duncan in 1981. Next was a second pup called Honey—named in honour of her predecessor—who was trained by presenter John Leslie during 1991. In 2006 Andy Akinwolere began puppy walking a new Blue Peter guide dog puppy, named by viewers as Magic. Magic had epilepsy and could not complete her Guide Dog training, so she was re-homed. In June 2014, presenter Lindsey Russell started to train a new guide dog called Iggy. She completed her guide dog training and left the show on 12 May 2016 to join her new owner, Callum.

== Cats ==
Helen Skelton and Socks the cat

=== Jason ===
Jason (3 May 1964 – 16 January 1976) was the first Blue Peter cat. He was a Seal Point Siamese who joined after appearing on an episode with his mother, brother and sister at just three weeks old. He was named by a viewer who was a resident of Jasons Hill in Botley, Buckinghamshire.

In December 1975 Jason played the part of the Cheshire Cat in the show's Christmas production, "Alice in Blue Peter Land". Jason lived until January 1976 aged 12.

=== Jack ===
Jack (29 January 1976 – 20 April 1986) was a silver striped tabby and the brother of Jill who made his television debut with his sister just three weeks after they were born. Jack and Jill became known as Blue Peter's disappearing cats, for whenever they appeared on screen they tended to leap out of a presenter's lap. The production team put together a sequence of clips demonstrating this, featuring various moments when the cats leapt out of sight. It was set to the theme of the cartoon Top Cat, and was often requested by viewers as the clip they most wanted to see again. Jack died suddenly in 1986 at 10 years old.

=== Jill ===
Jill (29 January 1976 – 30 May 1983) was a silver spotted tabby and the sister of Jack. She often appeared with her brother, famously leaping out of presenter's laps whenever on screen. On 15 May 1980 Jill gave birth to two kittens who appeared with their mother on the show on 23 June. Jill died of heart failure in 1983 at 7 years old.

=== Willow ===
Willow (11 May 1986 –) a Siamese × Balinese, first appeared on Blue Peter in September 1986 as a replacement to Jack, who had died a few months earlier. Viewers were asked to send in their suggestions for a name, and the name Willow was chosen, probably because of the kitten's oriental looks. Rather than follow Willow's progress as a mother, it was decided that she should be the first pet to be spayed. This decision was taken because of the vast numbers of unwanted pets destroyed by the RSPCA every year. Willow retired from the programme in 1991 to live in Sussex.

=== Kari and Oke ===
Kari and Oke (1991 – 2006/2011) were rescued as kittens and placed in the care of Wood Green Animal Shelters in Heydon, Cambridgeshire. Oke was found abandoned in a bush and the staff of the centre set about the tricky task of trying to encourage Kari's mother to adopt Oke. The plan worked and the pair became brother and sister. Six weeks after being rescued, they made their Blue Peter debut. They were named after John Leslie and Diane-Louise Jordan's Summer Expedition to Japan in 1991, where they performed karaoke. Kari and Oke retired from the programme in 2004, shortly after their 13th birthday. Kari died in 2006 at the age of 15; Oke died in mid-2011, aged 20.

=== Smudge ===
Smudge (10 July 2004 – 2005) was one of the shortest serving Blue Peter pets. First seen on-screen on 14 September 2004, Smudge was named as a kitten by the viewers and was one of the most popular kittens on the show, but died in 2005 from injuries sustained after being hit by a car.

=== Socks ===
Socks (29 November 2005 –) is a ragdoll cat, who first appeared on the show on 9 January 2006 as Smudge's replacement. Socks was at the centre of a scandal on the show after the programme's producers falsified the result of a viewer vote to choose the cat's name. Viewers had selected the name Cookie, but producers changed the result to Socks. Both Socks and Cookie stopped appearing regularly on the show after it moved to Salford in September 2011, and left permanently in October 2013 as it was felt that the journey from London, where they lived, was too far.

=== Cookie ===
Cookie (29 June 2007 –) was introduced to the show on 25 September 2007 following the scandal caused by the change of Socks' name. Cookie left in October 2013 along with Socks.

== Tortoises ==
=== Freda ===
Freda was the first Blue Peter tortoise. She made her debut on 21 October 1963 and lived to April 1979. She was originally thought to be a male and was called Fred, but renamed when it was realised she was female. Freda is best remembered for her appearances each year when she was brought onto the show and placed into a cardboard box to hibernate over the harsh British winter.

=== Maggie and Jim ===
Maggie and Jim (27 August 1974 – January 1982) were brother and sister who made their first appearance in 1974 and joined the show on a regular basis in 1979, after the death of Freda. They were named after Margaret Thatcher and James Callaghan, both prime ministers of that year. Neither tortoise survived the cold winter of January 1982.

=== George ===
George (c. 1920 – 10 May 2004) was a Mediterranean spur-thighed tortoise who first appeared on the programme in 1982 and holds the title of longest-serving Blue Peter pet. Originally named Pork Pie, viewers renamed him George. In 1988 George caused a scare when the home where he was kept had a break-in and he went missing. Thinking he had been killed, the production team broadcast a special tribute film about him, but George was found by a neighbour walking her dog some days later.

George made his last appearance on the show on 14 April 2004, and his death was announced on 10 May 2004; he was aged 83.

=== Shelley ===
Shelley (hatched c. 1985, Morocco) is a female Mediterranean spur-thighed tortoise who first appeared on the programme in 2004 as a friend to George and then became the only tortoise on the show after his death. Shelley retired after 15 years in 2019.

== Parrots ==
=== Joey ===
Joey, a grey parrot, was the first of two parrots to appear on Blue Peter during the 1960s with Petra, Patch, and Jason. In a 1986 documentary shown on BBC2 as part of the Did You See...? series, former presenter Peter Purves recalled that Biddy Baxter, the show's editor, had called him in floods of tears the day Joey had died. Amazon parrots have the potential to live for about 60 years; nevertheless, having a parrot as one of the pets on the programme was discontinued in the 1960s.

=== Barney ===
Barney, a blue-fronted amazon, was the second and final Blue Peter parrot, brought into the programme in the 1960s after the death of the previous parrot, Joey. When Barney died, he was not replaced.

== See also ==
- List of individual cats
- List of individual dogs
