= Take Me Home =

Take Me Home may refer to:

== Music ==
=== Albums ===
- Take Me Home (Cher album) or the title song (see below), 1979
- Take Me Home (One Direction album), 2012
- Take Me Home (Sam Clark album) or the title song, 2010
- Take Me Home (Zox album), 2003
- Take Me Home (EP), by PinkPantheress, or the title song, 2022
- Take Me Home, by the Bellamy Brothers, 1994
- Take Me Home, by Nomfusi, 2012
- Take Me Home, by X-Perience, 1997
- Celtic Thunder: Take Me Home, by Celtic Thunder, 2009

=== Songs ===
- "Take Me Home" (Cash Cash song), 2013
- "Take Me Home" (Cher song), 1979; covered by Sophie Ellis-Bextor, 2001
- "Take Me Home" (Jess Glynne song), 2015
- "Take Me Home" (Jess Moskaluke song), 2016
- "Take Me Home" (Phil Collins song), 1985
- "Take Me Home" (Roger Daltrey song), 1987
- "Take Me Home (4 Christmas)", by Olivia Rodrigo, 2026
- "Take Me Home", by 2-4 Family from Family Business, 1999
- "Take Me Home", by Aero Chord ft. Nevve, 2019
- "Take Me Home", by After Midnight Project from Let's Build Something to Break, 2009
- "Take Me Home", by Alexandra Stan, 2020
- "Take Me Home", by Ateez from Zero: Fever Part.2, 2021
- "Take Me Home", by Benson Boone from American Heart, 2025
- "Take Me Home", by Bill Conti from the For Your Eyes Only film soundtrack, 1981
- "Take Me Home", by Black Sabbath from The End, 2016
- "Take Me Home", by Boys Like Girls from Crazy World, 2012
- "Take Me Home", by Brother Ali from The Undisputed Truth, 2007
- "Take Me Home", by Bryce Vine, 2013
- "Take Me Home", by Delta Goodrem, B-side of the single "In This Life", 2007
- "Take Me Home", by Dramatis from For Future Reference, 1981
- "Take Me Home", by Guillemots from Red, 2008
- "Take Me Home", by Hollywood Undead from Day of the Dead, 2015
- "Take Me Home", by Ingrid Michaelson from Stranger Songs, 2019
- "Take Me Home", by Inna from Champagne Problems, 2022
- "Take Me Home", by Jack Savoretti from Before the Storm, 2012
- "Take Me Home", by Julian Lennon from Help Yourself, 1991
- "Take Me Home", by Knocked Loose from You Won't Go Before You're Supposed To, 2024
- "Take Me Home", by Lacuna Coil from Delirium, 2016
- "Take Me Home", by Liberty X from Being Somebody, 2003
- "Take Me Home", by Little River Band from After Hours, 1976
- "Take Me Home", by Loudness from Hurricane Eyes, 1987
- "Take Me Home", by Midnight Red, 2013
- "Take Me Home", by the Outfield from Rockeye, 1992
- "Take Me Home", by Peedi Peedi, 2007
- "Take Me Home", by the Showdown from Blood in the Gears, 2010
- "Take Me Home", by Spice Girls, B-side of the single "Say You'll Be There", 1996
- "Take Me Home", by Ted Nugent, from Penetrator, 1984
- "Take Me Home", by Terror Squad from True Story, 2004
- "Take Me Home", by Tom Waits from One from the Heart, 1982
- "Take Me Home", by Vince Staples from Vince Staples, 2021
- "Take Me Home", by White Lion from Return of the Pride, 2008
- "Take Me Home", written by Arthur Korb
- "Take Me Home", from the film Molly and Lawless John, nominated for a Golden Globe Award for Best Original Song, 1972
- "Take Me Home (Piss Off)", by Snuff from Tweet Tweet My Lovely, 1998

== Film ==
- Take Me Home (1928 film), an American lost silent comedy by Marshall Neilan and starring Bebe Daniels
- Take Me Home (2011 film), an American romantic comedy by Sam Jaeger
- Take Me Home (2023 film), an American dramatic short film by Liz Sargent
  - Take Me Home (2026 film), a feature-length adaptation of the 2023 short film

== Television ==
- Take Me Home (TV series), a 1989 British three-part drama series
- "Take Me Home" (Ironheart), an episode of Ironheart

== Other uses ==
- Take Me Home, a 1994 autobiography by John Denver, or a 2000 television film based on the book

== See also ==
- "Take Me Home, Country Roads", a song by John Denver
- Take Me Home Tonight (disambiguation)
- Take Me Home Tour (disambiguation)
