= Coalition of Asian Pacifics in Entertainment =

American advocacy organization

CAPE
- Formation: 1991; 35 years ago
- Type: 501(c)(3) organization
- Headquarters: Los Angeles, California
- Region served: U.S.
- Executive Director: Michelle K. Sugihara
- Website: https://capeusa.org

The Coalition of Asian Pacifics in Entertainment (CAPE) is a 501(c)(3) non-profit media arts and storytellers organization that advocates for Asian Americans and Pacific Islanders in the entertainment industry, specifically in television and film. Established in 1991, CAPE "champions diversity by educating, connecting, and empowering Asian American and Pacific Islander artists and leaders in entertainment and media." The organization focuses on training development program and incubators for emerging, mid-level entertainment and high-level industry professionals and media consulting and training services.

== History ==
CAPE was founded in 1991 as a way to connect Asian Americans and Pacific Islanders in the entertainment industry by television producer and executive Wenda Fong, publicist Fritz Friedman, and film producer and executive Chris Lee. The organization had few members when it was founded, as there were very few Asian Americans and Pacific Islanders who were very visible in the media. However, since its founding, CAPE has grown to support both new and established actors, writers, directors, producers, agents, and executives. Despite starting small, the CAPE community mobilized through volunteer efforts, and their educational programs and opportunities have helped members develop their careers in the entertainment industry by connecting them to the tools they need to enhance their careers. Additionally, CAPE has been working on developing connections with US and International film industries of China, India, Korea, Japan, Taiwan, and the Philippines.

In 2009, CAPE hired its first staff member in Executive Director, Jennifer Sanderson. It was in 2014 that CAPE moved from being a paid membership-driven organization to a mission-driven organization. The organization decided that in order to fulfill its original goals of serving the artists in the Asian American and Pacific Islander community, they needed to open up their resources to be available to anyone who needed to access them. The same year, Jennifer Sanderson officially stepped down and in 2015, Michelle K. Sugihara took helm and is currently CAPE's Executive Director.

In October 2016, CAPE celebrated its 25th anniversary. Steven Yeun, Harry Shum Jr., and Constance Wu were some of the many in attendance.

In October 2026, CAPE celebrated their 35th anniversary gala, their first anniversary celebration in a decade (with the 30th anniversary on pause due to the COVID-19 pandemic) and honored Kalikolehua Hurley of Walt Disney Animation Studios, actor and filmmaker Randall Park, actor Ben Wang, Street Fighter director Kitao Sakurai, Netflix executive Jinny Howe, The Women of The Pitt and actor Manny Jacinto.

== Programs ==
=== CAPE New Writers Award ===
The CAPE New Writers Award was established in 1999 in order to discover and help emerging AAPI writers and artists. Writers submit original works in two categories, film and television. Up to 10 writers are selected and winners receive a $4,000 prize, a reading of their script, and opportunities to connect with entertainment executives and producers. Notable winners of the fellowship include Alice Wu, Randall Park, Leonard Chang, and Matthew Yang King. The competition has since retired and transitioned into the CAPE New Writers Fellowship.

=== CAPE New Writers Fellowship ===
In 2014, CAPE ended their CAPE New Writers Awards competition to move focus move on developmental training and incubation for screenwriters. Founded by Writer-Producer Leo Chu and studio executive Stephen Tao, CAPE's New Writers Fellowship Program is a non-studio professional development program that trains and develops emerging writers to succeed in Hollywood. Participants of the program engage in intensive curriculum training through master classes, panels and workshops featuring professionals in the industry from working screenwriters, development executives, literary agents and managers and more. The program also includes one-on-one script mentoring with a high-level screenwriter-producer. Fellowship winners are presented at an annual graduation event to which members of the Asian American and Pacific Islander entertainment community are invited. 2022 marks a decade of the program.

Alumni of the fellowship include Director-Writer Iram Parveen Bilal, screenwriter-producer Kevin Lau, April Shi and others.

=== CAPE Executives Fellowship ===
In 2017, CAPE launched the CAPE Executives Fellowship (which was originally called the CAPE Leaders Fellowship) to develop leadership training to mid-level executives in film and television development, current and production.

=== CAPE Animation Directors Accelerator ===
In 2021, CAPE launched their third program, the CAPE Animation Directors Accelerator under co-chairs KPop Demon Hunters Producer Michelle Wong and former Sony Pictures Animation executive Justinian Huang. The program focuses on training animation professionals providing mentorship, panels, workshops and masterclasses with high-level industry execs, producers and creatives in the animation industry.

=== CAPE Showrunners Incubator ===
In 2024, CAPE ventured into programming to support television writer and producers on the pathway to becoming TV showrunners with Starz #TakeTheLead. The incubator provides hands-on training including mock writers room interviews, casting sessions and more in addition to panels and masterclasses.

=== Julia S. Gouw Short Film Challenge ===
The Julia S. Gouw Short Film Challenge is a grant program that begun as a partnership between CAPE, philanthropist Julia S. Gouw and producer Janet Yang that begun in 2021. Each year, a $25,000 production grant is provided to four filmmakers each toward a live-action or animated short film centering Asian and Pacific women or non-binary protagonists. Many of the short films from this program have gone to major film festivals including Sundance Film Festival, SXSW, Annecy Festival, Cannes Film Festival, and more. The most notable alum is Liz Sargent with her short film Take Me Home from the grant's inaugural year; the short film later became a feature film of the same name that premiered at Sundance Film Festival with Anna Sargent reprising her role and starring opposite Ali Ahn.

=== CAPE x TAAF Rising Filmmakers Finishing Fund ===
The Rising Filmmakers Finishing Fund is CAPE's second foray into production grants. CAPE teamed up with TAAF to provide two filmmakers $50,000 post-production grants for filmmakers working on their second to fifth feature film with the purpose of sustaining filmmaker's careers. In its inaugural year, Beth de Araújo's film Josephine starring Channing Tatum and Gemma Chan and Ravi Kapoor's film Patel received the grant.

== Other Initiatives ==
=== #IAm campaign ===
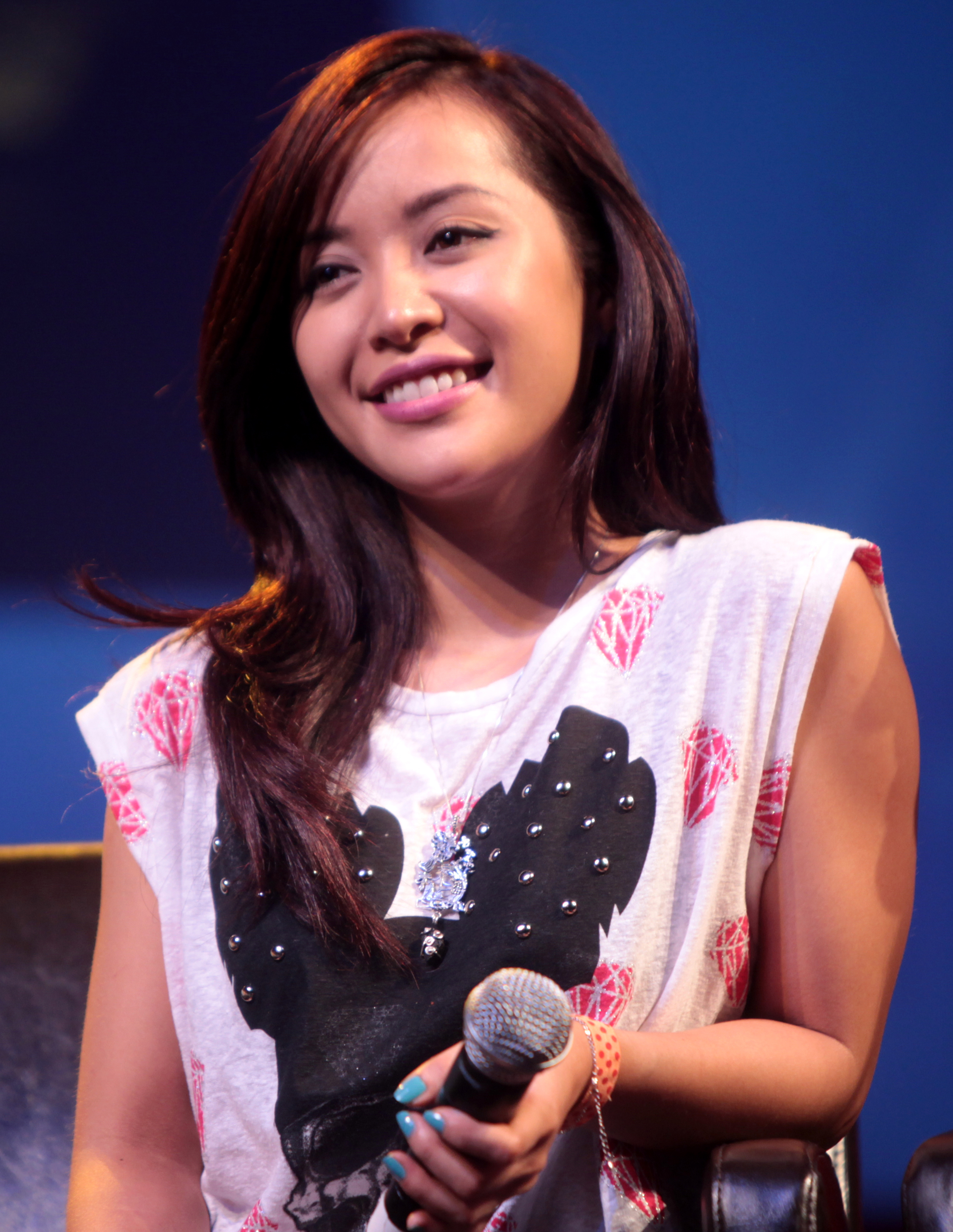
Michelle Phan

The #IAm campaign was launched in 2014 as a way to increase visibility and recognition of Asian Americans and Pacific Islanders. The goal of the campaign was to encourage Asian Americans to share their stories to commemorate Asian Pacific American Heritage Month in May. The campaign consists of an online web series featuring well known actors, musicians, and influential members of the entertainment sector providing stories about their experiences as Asian Americans and Pacific Islanders. The following have been participants of the I Am campaign for the following years:

2014: Amy Hill, Bobby Lee, Brian Tee, Carrie Ann Inaba, Wong Fu Productions (Phillip Wang and Wesley Chan), Christine Ha, David Choi, Harry Shum Jr., Jessica Gomes, Leonardo Nam, Lisa Ling, Melissa Tang, Phil Yu of Angry Asian Man, Randall Park, Kelly Hu, Steven Yeun, Jeremy Lin, Michelle Phan, and Ryan Higa.

2015: Constance Wu, Ki Hong Lee, Daniel Dae Kim, Cassey Ho, Seoul Sausage, Jason Chen, and Arden Cho.

2016: Megan Lee, D-Trix, Ming-Na Wen, and Danny Pudi.

2018: Sandra Oh, Mari Takahashi, Abhijay Prakash, Michelle Kwan, AJ Rafael

2019: Tzi Ma, Apolo Ohno, Ally Maki, Nisha Ganatra, Albert Cheng
