= Shep (British dog) =

Dog featured on "Blue Peter"

- Species: Canis lupus familiaris
- Breed: Border Collie
- Sex: Male
- Born: 1 May 1971
- Died: 17 January 1987 (aged 15 years 8 months)
- Owner: John Noakes
- Appearance: Blue Peter; Go With Noakes

Shep (1 May 1971 – 17 January 1987) was a Blue Peter dog, a Border Collie. He was bought by the BBC to replace Patch, one of Petra's puppies, born in 1965. Shep became the main Blue Peter dog when Petra died in 1977. Shep debuted on Blue Peter on 16 September 1971 and was named a week later.

== Appearances ==
Shep is remembered by British television viewers as inseparable from Blue Peter presenter John Noakes. Shep was excitable, and Noakes would often have to restrain him. Noakes' common refrain, "Get down, Shep!", became a catchphrase, and The Barron Knights released a song with that title. Shep appeared alongside Valerie Singleton, Peter Purves, Lesley Judd and Simon Groom as well as fellow Blue Peter pets Petra, Jason, Jack and Jill and Goldie. One of his most famous moments is when Roy Castle came on the show and Shep tried to join in. Shep left Blue Peter when Noakes departed the show in June 1978.

Shep also appeared with Noakes in six series of Go With Noakes, from 1976 to 1980. Noakes left Blue Peter on 26 June 1978, and the BBC offered to let him keep Shep, as the dog had lived with him since his TV debut. Despite Shep living with Noakes, the dog was always legally owned by the BBC and in rules that also applied to himself whilst under contract to the BBC, he could not use Shep for advertising or commercial purposes. Noakes was paid a stipend to cover all Shep's costs from the Blue Peter budget (as was Peter Purves for Petra and later Simon Groom for Goldie) and as part of the agreement to keep Shep after leaving the show, Noakes agreed to the maintenance of the no-advertising condition.

== Departure ==
However, shortly after leaving the show, Noakes was furious to discover that what he called his "dog money" ceased to be paid and he confronted the show's producer Biddy Baxter in a phone call. Baxter was adamant that the programme should no longer be responsible for any of Shep's costs after the dog had left Blue Peter, although she did sympathise with some of his argument and felt that the BBC should pay Noakes for Shep to appear in Go With Noakes or for 'personal appearances' the dog made. However, according to what she later wrote, Noakes was too angry to discuss the matter, and the two rarely spoke again. Soon after this angry confrontation, Noakes relinquished Shep, who went to live with Edith Menzies.

Noakes subsequently appeared in a series of television advertisements for Spillers "Choice Cuts" dog food, using a dog that was indistinguishable from Shep but named Skip. The clear subterfuge led to a deeper rift between him and Baxter. Noakes called her a "stupid woman" in a televised 2008 documentary celebrating the show's 50th anniversary. Shep died on 17 January 1987. Noakes revealed on Fax that Shep had died three days before. Noakes often became emotional when asked about him; he openly wept on a 2008 edition of The Weakest Link when hostess Anne Robinson asked him about the dog.

== See also ==
- List of individual dogs

Preceded by Petra	Blue Peter Dog; 1977–1978	Succeeded by Goldie
