= Minos Papas =

Greek-Cypriot filmmaker

- Born: London, England
- Education: School of Visual Arts
- Occupation: Filmmaker
- Years active: 2002–present
- Spouse: Liz Sargent

Minos Papas is a Greek-Cypriot film director, writer, producer, and cinematographer. He is based in Los Angeles, and heads the production company Cyprian Films, New York.

== Early life and education ==
Papas was born in London and raised in Cyprus. During his military service in Cyprus, he was the army's official cameraman. He worked at the Acropole Cinema in Nicosia, and then in 1999, he moved to New York City, earning a bachelor's degree from the School of Visual Arts in 2004.

== Career ==
Papas's debut feature film was the 2009 film Shutterbug, on which he served as writer, director, producer, and editor. Filmed in New York City and starring Nando Del Castillo as a photographer with damaged vision, it was inspired by Dante's Inferno and Greek mythology. The film was an extension of Papas's thesis short film Kalipolis.

Papas's short documentary A Short Film About Guns won Best Online Short at the 2013 Tribeca Film Festival. His short film Tango on the Balcony, about a US military veteran suffering from post-traumatic stress disorder, won the award for Best Director at the International Short Film Festival of Cyprus in 2016. His second feature film as director, 2015's Behind the Mirror, was written by Nicholas Sampson and filmed in upstate New York.

Papas produced and served as cinematographer on the short film Take Me Home, which was directed by his wife Liz Sargent and premiered at the 2023 Sundance Film Festival. In 2024, it was announced that Take Me Home would be adapted into a feature film of the same name, to be written and directed by Sargent, with Papas producing. The feature premiered at the 2026 Sundance Film Festival.

Papas's folk horror feature film Motherwitch, which he wrote, directed and produced, premiered at the 2026 International Film Festival Rotterdam. It was filmed in Cyprus in March and April 2024, and was produced by Caretta Films, Focus Pocus, and Cyprian Films, New York as a co-production of Cyprus, North Macedonia, and the United States. It is based on the Cypriot folklore of the Kallikantzaros, and set in the late 19th century, with the characters speaking in the historical Cypriot dialect.

As a cinematographer, Papas has shot two features for his father Michael Papas: Secret Paths (2013) and Little Odysseus and the Cyclops (2014). He also shot the features Fatal Promises (directed by Kat Rohrer, 2009) and '79 Parts (directed by Ari Taub, 2016), Lisanne Skyler's documentary short film Brillo Box (3 ¢ Off) (2016), and was a camera operator on Martin Scorsese's documentary The 50 Year Argument (2014).

Papas founded and heads the production company Cyprian Films, New York, which he established in 2005, and also heads the sister company Polyorama Pictures & Publishing, which is based in Cyprus. He is a two-time New York Emmy Award winner.

== Personal life ==
Papas is married to filmmaker Liz Sargent. His Cypriot father, Michael Papas, is also a filmmaker, and his British mother, Susan Papas, is a film producer. After more than 20 years in New York City, Papas relocated to Los Angeles in 2024.

== Filmography ==
Feature films

Year	Title	Director	Writer	Producer	DoP
2009	Shutterbug	Yes	Yes	Yes	No
2015	Behind the Mirror	Yes	No	Yes	No
2026	Take Me Home	No	No	Yes	2nd unit
2026	Motherwitch	Yes	Yes	Yes	No

Short films

Year	Title	Director	Writer	Producer	DoP
2004	Kalipolis	Yes	Yes	Yes	Yes
2012	A Short Film About Guns	Yes	No	Yes	Yes
2016	Tango on the Balcony	Yes	Yes	Yes	Yes
2023	Take Me Home	No	No	Yes	Yes

Television

Year	Title	Director	Writer	Producer	DoP	Note
2021	Flowstate/North Brooklyn Artists	Yes	Yes	Yes	Yes	8 episodes
