= Go With Noakes =

British children's television series (1976–1980)

- Genre: Children's Documentary
- Directed by: Daniel Wolf; Chris Clough; Cyril Gates; Claire Walmsley; Alan Walsh
- Presented by: John Noakes; Shep
- Theme music composer: Thomas Clark
- Opening theme: On Ilkla Moor Baht 'at
- Composer: Thomas Clark
- Country of origin: United Kingdom
- No. of series: 6
- No. of episodes: 31

Production
- Executive producer: David Brown
- Producer: David Brown
- Running time: 25 minutes

Original release
- Network: BBC 1
- Release: 28 March 1976 – 21 December 1980

Related
- Blue Peter; Blue Peter Special Assignment; Look Back With Noakes; Duncan Dares

Go With Noakes is a British television children's programme, broadcast between 28 March 1976 and 21 December 1980.

A documentary series, it was presented by John Noakes initially alongside, then following his departure from, Blue Peter in 1978. Broadly similar to the reports he made for that programme, each episode had an adventure-based outdoor theme in keeping with Noakes's reputation on Blue Peter as a man of action. Noakes was accompanied on most installments by Shep the dog, who had left Blue Peter at the same time. One episode featured the Blue Peter pony for the disabled 'Rags'. Travelling around the country, they got involved in diverse activities like motor racing, rowing, aerobatics and painting. In each series Noakes was featured travelling around Britain in a particular mode, e.g. sailing, narrow boat, walking, open top car, etc.

The series was produced by BBC Manchester and began on 28 March 1976, running for six series and 31 episodes. The last edition was transmitted on 21 December 1980. Being made on film allowed great flexibility with the shooting and editing of each week's subject matter. An example of the first series run was where Noakes met the RAF's Red Arrows aerial display team (first broadcast 11 April 1976). This edition is available to view on the BBC's Archive website and shows Noakes sitting in on the teams' debriefing, taking part in a simulated flying lesson as well as being a passenger in a practice display before helping the ground crew prepare the team for a big show. In the programme, Noakes references his former occupation where he trained as an aircraft engine fitter for the RAF and BOAC before deciding to become an actor.

The theme-tune for the series was 'On Ilkla Moor Baht 'at' ('On Ilkley Moor, without a hat'), a popular Yorkshire folk song sung to the tune of the hymn 'Cranbrook'. It was a reference to Noakes's own Yorkshire heritage. The end theme though was a different tune, the middle section of a piece called 'The Rovers Return' by Edrich Siebert.

A series of repeats was later broadcast under the title Look Back With Noakes.

A similar series entitled Duncan Dares hosted by one of Noakes's successors on Blue Peter, Peter Duncan, followed in 1985.

== Go With Noakes ==
=== Series 1 ===
Six episodes broadcast Sundays on BBC1 (except episode 5 broadcast Tuesday). Due to regional opt-outs, BBC1 Wales showed episodes 1-4 and 6 in June–July 1976. Producer: David Brown

No. overall	No. in season	Title	Directed by	Original release date
1	1	"The Lakeland Games"	Daniel Wolf	28 March 1976 – 4:30PM
John Noakes of Blue Peter comes to grips with The Lakeland Games: "They told me the Cumberland and Westmorland style wrestling was due to finish at three o'clock. The Fell Race up and down Butter Crag was fixed for 3.25. So why not enter both?”
2	2	"The Oxford Bumps"	Daniel Wolf	4 April 1976 – 5:00PM
John Noakes of Blue Peter puts his oar in The Oxford Bumps: "When I asked Balliol College if I could row in one of their Eights they warned me I was a bit underweight for an oarsman. But they said they'd see what they could do with me".
3	3	"The Red Arrows"	Daniel Wolf	11 April 1976 – 4:40PM
John Noakes of Blue Peter flies high with The Red Arrows: "I used to be an engine-fitter with the RAF, so I guessed what I was in for. But I hadn't bargained on the Arrows giving me the full treatment, and 16 minutes of aerobatics proved a bit too much".
4	4	"The Milk Race"	Daniel Wolf	25 April 1976 – 4:05PM
John Noakes of Blue Peter has a spin with The Milk Race: "To take part in a marathon like the Round Britain Cycle Race you've got to be utterly fit – and I wasn't".
5	5	"Formula 5000"	Daniel Wolf	4 May 1976 – 4:40PM
John Noakes of Blue Peter takes to the pits with Formula 5000: "It wasn't until we got to Oulton Park that one of the other mechanics told me the unwritten law of motor-racing – 'You can reckon that if nothing goes wrong, you're not trying'. "
6	6	"The Guernsey Handicap"	Daniel Wolf	9 May 1976 – 4:35PM
John Noakes of Blue Peter sails away to The Guernsey Handicap: 'It was Bob Fisher who suggested we went to race in the Channel Islands." Great yachting there," he said – "fresh winds, strong tides, lots of nasty rocks and currents and after all it's your boat we're taking ".'

=== Series 2 ===
Five episodes broadcast Sundays on BBC1. Producer: David Brown

No. overall	No. in season	Title	Directed by	Original release date
7	1	"Doing The Show's The Easy Bit"	Daniel Wolf	20 February 1977 – 4:30PM
John joins the Austen Brothers' Circus to sample the travelling life of the Big Top.
8	2	"Castleford Rules, OK?"	Daniel Wolf	27 February 1977 – 5:00PM
John tackles a week of training with the Castleford Rugby League team, as they prepare for a season of success.
9	3	"Paddlers Must Wear Life Jackets"	Daniel Wolf	6 March 1977 –5:00PM
John enters the toughest canoe race in Ireland, over ten weirs on the swollen River Liffey.
10	4	"The Walk Will Do You Good"	Daniel Wolf	13 March 1977 – 4:45PM
John and his dog Shep stride out on the 250-mile Pennine Way.
11	5	"The Lakeland Games"	Daniel Wolf	20 March 1977 – 5:00PM
John takes on Cumbria's toughest athletes at the annual Grasmere Sports.

=== Series 3 ===
Two episodes broadcast Fridays on BBC1. Producer: David Brown

No. overall	No. in season	Title	Directed by	Original release date
12	1	"You Might Win A Wee Prize!"	Daniel Wolf	11 November 1977 – 5:10PM
John visits the Pitlochry Highland Games.
13	2	"Blaenau Ffestiniog Here We Come!"	Daniel Wolf	18 November 1977 – 5:10PM
John joins the volunteer navvies on Britain's oldest narrow-gauge railway, in their two-year struggle to blast a new tunnel in the mountains of Wales.

=== Series 4 ===
A series of six holiday trips broadcast Sundays on BBC1. Producer: David Brown

No. overall	No. in season	Title	Directed by	Original release date
14	1	"Down To Land’s End"	Daniel Wolf	12 November 1978 – 5:25PM
John Noakes and Shep follow the ups and downs of the south-west coastal path.
15	2	"By Caravan Through Kerry"	Daniel Wolf	19 November 1978 – 5:30PM
John Noakes and Shep get taken for a ride along the lanes of south-west Ireland.
16	3	"Up The Road to the Isles"	Chris Clough	26 November 1978 – 5:30PM
John and Shep hitch their way through the highlands and islands.
17	4	"Along The South Downs"	Chris Clough	3 December 1978 – 5:25PM
John Noakes and Rags, the Blue Peter pony, ride out on the trail to Beachy Head.
18	5	"From Coast To Coast"	Chris Clough	10 December 1978 – 5:30PM
John and Shep take a bee-line across the lakes, dales and moors of Northern England.
19	6	"Around The Cheshire Ring"	Cyril Gates	17 December 1978 – 5:30PM
John Noakes and Shep take to the water for an inland voyage of discovery.

=== Series 5 ===
A six-part voyage of discovery around the coasts of Britain with John Noakes and Shep broadcast Sundays on BBC1. Producer: David Brown

No. overall	No. in season	Title	Directed by	Original release date
20	1	"Southampton to Penzance"	Daniel Wolf	21 October 1979 – 4:30PM
The good ship Pleiades sails west, Shep meets 400 donkeys, John tries his first water-ski jump, and everyone makes for Helston in time for the Flora Dance.
21	2	"Fishguard to Porthmadog"	Cyril Gates	28 October 1979 – 4:35PM
The crew of Pleiades take shore leave in the land of song. John fishes from a coracle, scales a sheer rock face and discovers he's a baritone.
22	3	"Port St Mary to Rathlin Island"	Cyril Gates	4 November 1979 – 4:35PM
John explores the Millennium Way on the Isle of Man, and the Causeway coast in Co Antrim. Shep develops a taste for ice-cream and plays his first round of golf.
23	4	"Lamlash to Inverness"	Claire Walmsley	11 November 1979 – 4:30PM
Pleiades navigates the Corryvreckan whirlpool and the Caledonian Canal. John goes in search of the White Stag on the Isle of Arran, and Shep keeps an eye open for the Loch Ness Monster.
24	5	"Queensferry to Whitby"	Claire Walmsley	18 November 1979 – 4:35PM
John takes a stroll up the Forth Bridge, Shep takes a lesson in shepherding, and David Bellamy challenges them both to a marathon Pooh-stick race.
25	6	"Wells-Next-The-Sea to Woodbridge"	Daniel Wolf	25 November 1979 – 4:30PM
Pleiades revisits the yard where she was built, and Shep is introduced to Mr Punch. John plays croquet, goes banger-racing, and becomes an artist.

=== Series 6 ===
Six programmes in which John Noakes and Shep take a Sunday afternoon drive down the by-ways of Britain broadcast on BBC1. Producer: David Brown

No. overall	No. in season	Title	Directed by	Original release date
26	1	"Mills and Dales"	Cyril Gates	16 November 1980 – 3:45PM
John gets 'Nellie' (a Morris Minor tourer) back on the road, takes a stroll beneath the Pennines, ties up some loose ends in Hawes, and goes for a spin at Harewood. Shep hears all about Ilkley Moor, and comes face-to-face with a church mouse.
27	2	"Wolds and Fens"	Cyril Gates	23 November 1980 – 3:50PM
John spins a pot at Alford, goes for gold with the Friskney Bow-men, sizes up Geoff Capes and takes on the US Air Force at football. Shep has a bracing day out at Skegness.
28	3	"Downs and Rivers"	Cyril Gates	30 November 1980 – 3:40PM
John punts down the Thames, puts a leg on a chair, and goes up, up and away. Percy Edwards chats to the animals at Whipsnade Zoo and Shep takes a close look at village life.
29	4	"Coasts and Cottages"	Cyril Gates	7 December 1980 – 3:45PM
John races a 'cat' at Gosport, breaks a record with Roy Castle and thatches a roof at Milton Abbas; Shep drops in for tea with Lesley Judd and Brillo.
30	5	"Borders and Bridges"	Alan Walsh	14 December 1980 – 3:40PM
John dodges birds of prey, blows a glass vase, pulls some onions with Percy Thrower and climbs down a factory chimney. Shep enters the Dog Olympics.
31	6	"Peaks and Pattis"	Cyril Gates	21 December 1980 – 4:00PM
John walks over hill and glides over dale. Shep goes fishing and finds a wallaby. They return to Halifax for the Piece Hall Carol Concert, and say farewell to Nellie with the Black Dyke Mills Band.

== Look Back With Noakes ==
=== Series 1 ===
No. overall	No. in season	Title	Directed by	Original release date
TBA	TBA	"Paddlers Must Wear Life Jackets"	Unknown	21 December 1983 – 12:05PM
TBA	TBA	"The Walk Will Do You Good"	Unknown	22 December 1983 – 12:00PM
TBA	TBA	"Down To Land's End"	Unknown	26 December 1983 – 12:00PM
TBA	TBA	"The Oxford Bumps"	Unknown	27 December 1983 – 12:00PM
TBA	TBA	"Up The Road to the Isles"	Unknown	28 December 1983 – 12:00PM
TBA	TBA	"The Lakeland Games"	Unknown	3 January 1984 – 12:00PM
TBA	TBA	"Along The South Downs"	Unknown	4 January 1984 – 12:00PM
TBA	TBA	"The Guernsey Handicap"	Unknown	5 January 1984 – 12:00PM

=== Series 2 ===
No. overall	No. in season	Title	Directed by	Original release date
TBA	TBA	"By Caravan Through Kerry"	Unknown	16 April 1984 – 9:20AM
TBA	TBA	"You Might Win A Wee Prize!"	Unknown	17 April 1984 – 9:20AM
TBA	TBA	"Around The Cheshire Ring"	Unknown	18 April 1984 – 9:20AM
TBA	TBA	"Castleford Rules OK?"	Unknown	19 April 1984 – 9:20AM
TBA	TBA	"From Lamlash to Inverness"	Unknown	25 April 1984 – 9:20AM
TBA	TBA	"From Queensferry to Whitby"	Unknown	26 April 1984 – 9:20AM
TBA	TBA	"From Wells-Next-The-Sea to Woodbridge"	Unknown	27 April 1984 – 9:20AM

=== Series 3 ===
No. overall	No. in season	Title	Directed by	Original release date
TBA	TBA	"Blaenau Ffestiniog Here we Come"	Unknown	1 July 1984 – 9:35AM
TBA	TBA	"Down to Land's End"	Unknown	8 July 1984 – 9:35AM
TBA	TBA	"By Caravan Through Kerry"	Unknown	15 July 1984 – 9:35AM
