= Waldo Salt Screenwriting Award =

Sundance Film Festival award

- Description: Award presented at the Sundance Film Festival recognizing outstanding screenwriting in dramatic features
- Country: United States
- Presented by: Sundance Film Festival
- Website: https://history.sundance.org/award/Waldo-Salt-Screenwriting-Award

The following is a list of recipients of the Waldo Salt Screenwriting Award for dramatic features presented at the Sundance Film Festival.

== History ==
It is an award given each year by U.S. Dramatic jury, starting in 1991. The award is named for screenwriter Waldo Salt, who won Oscars for Midnight Cowboy and Coming Home, and served as a creative advisor in multiple Sundance Institute Labs for directors and screenwriters, sharing his expertise with emerging filmmakers.

== Winners ==
Year	Film	Screenwriter(s)
1991	Hangin' with the Homeboys	Joseph Vásquez
1991	Trust	Hal Hartley
1992	The Waterdance	Neal Jimenez
1993	Combination Platter	Edwin Baker and Tony Chan
1994	What Happened Was	Tom Noonan
1995	Living in Oblivion	Tom DiCillo
1996	Big Night	Joseph Tropicano and Stanley Tucci
1997	Sunday	James Lasdun and Jonathan Nossiter
1998	High Art	Lisa Cholodenko
1999	Guinevere	Audrey Wells
1999	Joe the King	Frank Whaley
2000	You Can Count on Me	Kenneth Lonergan
2001	Memento	Christopher Nolan
2002	Love Liza	Gordy Hoffman
2003	The Station Agent	Tom McCarthy
2004	We Don't Live Here Anymore	Larry Gross
2005	The Squid and the Whale	Noah Baumbach
2006	Stephanie Daley	Hilary Brougher
2007	Grace Is Gone	James C. Strouse
2008	Sleep Dealer	Alex Rivera and David Riker
2009	Paper Heart	Nick Jasenovec and Lo Mutac (Note: Credited as Charlyne Yi)
2010	Winter's Bone	Debra Granik and Anne Rosellini
2011	Another Happy Day	Sam Levinson
2012	Safety Not Guaranteed	Derek Connolly
2013	In a World...	Lake Bell
2014	The Skeleton Twins	Craig Johnson and Mark Heyman
2015	The Stanford Prison Experiment	Tim Talbott
2016	Morris from America	Chad Hartigan
2017	Ingrid Goes West	Matt Spicer and David Branson Smith
2018	Nancy	Christina Choe
2019	Share	Pippa Bianco
2020	Nine Days	Edson Oda
2021	On the Count of Three	Ari Katcher and Ryan Welch
2022	Emergency	K.D. Dávila
2023	The Persian Version	Maryam Keshavarz
2024	A Real Pain	Jesse Eisenberg
2025	Sorry, Baby	Eva Victor
2026	Take Me Home	Liz Sargent

== See also ==
- Academy Award for Best Original Screenplay
- Academy Award for Best Adapted Screenplay
