= Take You Home =

Take You Home may refer to:

- "Take You Home" (A1 song), 2009
- "Take You Home" (Baekhyun song), 2017
- "Secret (Take You Home)", a song by Kylie Minogue from the album Body Language
- "Take You Home" (featuring Kelis), a song by Angie Martinez
- "Take You Home" (featuring Lil' Mo), a song by Fabolous from the album Ghetto Fabolous
- "Take You Home", a song by Annie from the album Don't Stop
- "Take You Home", a song by Anthony Hamilton from the album What I'm Feelin'
- "Take You Home", a song by Dido from Still on My Mind
- "Take You Home", a song by Hardline from the album Human Nature
- "Take You Home", a song by Benji Hughes from the album Songs in the Key of Animals
- "Take You Home", a song by Lloyd from the album Street Love
- "Take You Home", a song by Thomas Rhett from the album It Goes Like This
- "Take You Home", a song by Scars on 45 from the album Safety in Numbers
- "Take You Home", a song by Sloppy Seconds from the album Destroyed

== See also ==
- "Take Ya Home", a 2002 song by Lil' Bow Wow
- Take Me Home (disambiguation)
- "I Wonder If I Take You Home", a 1984 song by Lisa Lisa and Cult Jam
