= K.D. Dávila =

Mexican-American director

- Education: BA, Princeton University; MFA, University of Southern California
- Occupations: Writer; Director; Producer
- Awards: Academy Award Nominee, Best Live Action Short Film (2021); Waldo Salt Screenwriting Award (2022)

K.D. Dávila is an American filmmaker who wrote Emergency (2022) and directed the Academy Award-nominated short film Please Hold (2020).

== Career ==
Dávila began her career as a television writer, writing on the staff of the science fiction series Salvation and the fantasy series Motherland: Fort Salem.

Dávila was nominated for the Academy Award for Best Live Action Short Film in 2021 for her directorial debut, Please Hold. New York Times film critic Jeannette Catsoulis described it as "a shockingly clever satire of the privatized prison system and the elusiveness of justice."

Dávila wrote and executive produced the feature film Emergency, a dark comedy thriller directed by Carey Williams, produced by Temple Hill Entertainment and Amazon Studios. In April 2021, RJ Cyler, Sabrina Carpenter, Donald Elise Watkins, Sebastian Chacon, Maddie Nichols, Madison Thompson, and Diego Abraham were added to the cast. The film premiered at the 2022 Sundance Film Festival, where Dávila won the Waldo Salt Screenwriting Award. Her writing on Emergency garnered a nomination for an Independent Spirit Award for Best First Screenplay.

In 2022, she was named as one of Variety's Top Ten Latino Content Creators to Watch.

In 2024, she wrote the Dungeons & Dragons episode of the animated anthology Secret Level.
