= Motherwitch =

- Promotional poster
- Greek: Δωδεκάμερον
- Directed by: Minos Papas
- Written by: Evripidis Dikaios; Nikolas Kouroumtzis; Minos Papas
- Produced by: Constantinos Nikiforou; Minos Papas; Darko Popov
- Starring: Margarita Zachariou; Miltos Yerolemou; Danae Katsameni; Jason Hughes; Athos Antoniou; Sifis Katsoulakis; Marina Makris
- Cinematography: Jack McDonald
- Edited by: Smaro Papaevangelou
- Music by: Charles Humenry
- Production companies: Caretta Films; Focus Pocus Films; Cyprian Films, New York
- Release date: February 3, 2026 (IFFR)
- Running time: 104 minutes
- Countries: Cyprus; North Macedonia; United States
- Languages: Greek; French; English
- Budget: €1.7 million

Motherwitch (Greek: Δωδεκάμερον) is a 2026 gothic folk horror fantasy film directed by Minos Papas and co-written by Evripidis Dikaios and Nikolas Kouroumtzis.

== Premise ==
Eleni, a painter in Cyprus in 1882, reaches into the shadows to resurrect her lost children, but instead summons the ancient Kalikantzari of Cypriot lore. She must now confront the storm of her grief and anger, and lift the curse.

== Cast ==
- Margarita Zachariou as Eleni
- Miltos Yerolemou as Kounappis
- Danae Katsameni as Lamia / Saint Marina
- Jason Hughes as Sergeant Croyce
- Athos Antoniou as Kaeemis
- Sifis Katsoulakis as Michalakis
- Marina Makris as Maria
- Dimitri Andreas
- Jordan Walters as Lieutenant Richard Percy

== Production ==
In October 2024, filmmaker Minos Papas announced that that he would direct, produce, and co-write a fantasy horror film that's a co-production between Cyprus, North Macedonia, and the United States. The teaser trailer for the film was presented at the Cyprus Comic Con, and then later at the 2025 Cannes Film Festival.

== Release ==
Motherwitch premiered at the 55th International Film Festival Rotterdam on February 3, 2026.
