= Please Hold (2020 film) =

2020 short film by K.D. Dávila

- Directed by: K.D. Dávila
- Written by: K.D. Dávila & Levin Menekse
- Produced by: Marc Mounier; Diego Nájera; Levin Menekse
- Starring: Erick Lopez
- Cinematography: Farhad Ahmed Dehlvi
- Edited by: Brian Paison
- Music by: David Boman
- Production company: Scavenger Entertainment
- Distributed by: Max
- Release date: 2020
- Running time: 18 minutes
- Country: United States
- Language: English

Please Hold is a 2020 sci-fi dark comedy short film directed by K.D. Dávila.

== Summary ==
Mateo Torres, a young Latino man and fast food worker, is arrested by an autonomous police drone for an unknown crime that he insists he did not commit. He is taken to a fully automated private prison run by a company called Correcticorp, where Mateo tries and fails to get a hold of a human being. His AI public defender pressures to take a plea deal for the unknown crime.

Unable to afford a human attorney, Mateo toils away in his cell, working for Correcticorp's sister company Handmade, crocheting handmade accessories for an extremely low wage. He earns enough money to afford a phone call to his parents, but is cut off before he is able to explain his plight. Solitude grinds away at Mateo's sanity, and he contemplates taking the plea deal out of desperation, even though he still is unaware of his alleged crime.

Just before Mateo is about to accept the plea deal, he realizes his parents have wired him money, allowing him to hire a human attorney. The human attorney takes one look at his file, recognizes that a mistake has been made. Mateo is released from the jail. As he walks free, he listens to the voicemails that have accumulated in the time he spent in jail, notifying him that he has lost his job and his home, and that he no longer exists.

== Cast ==
- Erick Lopez as Mateo Torres
- Ruben Dávila as Guillermo Lima
- Doreen Calderon as Mama Torres
- Daniel Edward Mora as Papa Torres
- G.T. Karber as Justice Scaley, Esq.
- Dani Messerschmidt as Correcticorp AI

== Accolades ==
Best Live Action Short Film nomination - 94th Academy Awards

== See also ==
- The Pedestrian – 1951 short story by Ray Bradbury
- The Trial – 1925 novel by Franz Kafka
