= High Crimes =

2002 American psychological thriller film

- Theatrical release poster
- Directed by: Carl Franklin
- Screenplay by: Yuri Zeltser; Grace Cary Bickley
- Based on: High Crimes by Joseph Finder
- Produced by: Jesse Beaton; Arnon Milchan; Janet Yang
- Starring: Ashley Judd; Morgan Freeman; Jim Caviezel; Tom Bower
- Cinematography: Theo van de Sande
- Edited by: Carole Kravetz-Aykanian
- Music by: Graeme Revell
- Production company: Regency Enterprises
- Distributed by: Fox Searchlight Pictures
- Release date: April 5, 2002
- Running time: 115 minutes
- Country: United States
- Language: English
- Budget: $42 million
- Box office: $63.8 million

High Crimes is a 2002 American legal thriller film directed by Carl Franklin and starring Ashley Judd and Morgan Freeman, reunited from the 1997 film Kiss the Girls. The plot follows the successful criminal defense lawyer whose husband is arrested and accused of being the source of a shooting that killed nine people in El Salvador in 1990. An investigation reveals her husband was then a member of the United States Marine Corps, operating under a different name. The stakes are high as her client faces up to a life sentence for murder. The screenplay by Yuri Zeltser and Grace Cary Bickley is based on Joseph Finder's 1998 novel of the same name.

== Plot ==
Attorney Claire Kubik and her woodworker husband Tom are leading an idyllic life in Marin County, California, with no inkling that their lives are about to be shattered. During a Christmas shopping excursion in San Francisco's Union Square, Tom is suddenly arrested by the Federal Bureau of Investigation and charged with the 1990 murders of nine unarmed civilians in a village in El Salvador. Claire is shocked to discover that Tom's real name is Ronald Chapman and that he had been in a covert military operation with the United States Marine Corps, and has been on the run for the past 12 years. She finds it difficult to accept this revelation, but is determined to uncover the truth and save her husband from a life sentence.

Tom admits that he was at the scene of the mass murders but he vehemently insists that he had absolutely no role in the gruesome killings. His protests allude to the fact that he has been implicated in the crime to act as a scapegoat and protect Major James Hernandez, the real perpetrator who is now serving as the adjutant of Brigadier General Bill Marks. Tom is determined to forthrightly prove his innocence and is desperately pleading for justice and the truth to come to light, hoping that the local authorities would unearth the real villain and punish them accordingly. Such a happening, he believes, would give him the opportunity to make an authoritative and genuine case for his innocence and exonerate him of all doubts and suspicions that may be harboring in the minds of the public. Only with such a vindication can he reclaim the dignity he deserves and continue to live his life with pride.

First Lieutenant Terence Embry is assigned to defend Tom, but his youth and lack of experience prompt Claire to decide to assist professionally in defending her husband. When she realizes she needs help from someone familiar with the workings of a military court, she hires Charlie Grimes, an embittered former military attorney who has a grudge against the military brass, to assist her. Three of the five key witnesses, who previously testified Tom was guilty, have died under seemingly mysterious circumstances, raising Claire and Charlie's suspicions. As the trial proceeds, they uncover a massive cover-up perpetrated by one of the military's highest-ranking officials. Also creating problems are the sudden appearance of a resident of the village where the mass murder took place, who insists Tom was responsible; Embry's romantic involvement with Claire's irresponsible sister Jackie; Embry's drinking in a bar with the prosecutor, which leads Claire to assume that he leaked details about secrets she has uncovered to the prosecution; and Charlie's falling off the wagon after more than a year of sobriety.

The Salvadorian witness identifies an injured Hernandez as the culprit responsible for a bombing incident prior to the massacre. Claire recovers classified medical files from the FBI as evidence of the cover-up. Claire blackmails Marks by threatening to reveal what she knows about the cover-up and asks him to make the case go away; the next day, the U.S. Defense Department has the case thrown out of court due to "national security reasons".

Just as Claire is about to celebrate her victory in court, Charlie discovers the truth: Tom had murdered one of the witnesses in front of his family. The widow who witnessed the act described Tom's having tossed his gun from one hand to the other (a habit Tom displayed with keys and other objects throughout the film) and his shooting his gun first using one hand, then the other (revealing his ambidexterity). The match between these descriptions also indicated that Tom committed the massacre and also murdered two of the other key witnesses years prior to his arrest. After Tom overhears Claire talking to Charlie on the phone, a short scuffle between Claire and Tom ensues, during which Claire fears for her life. The Salvadorian witness shoots Tom through the window, and the film ends with Charlie and Claire partnering a new law firm.

== Cast ==
- Ashley Judd as Claire Kubik
- Morgan Freeman as Charlie Grimes
- Jim Caviezel as Tom Kubik/Ron Chapman
- Adam Scott as First Lieutenant Terence Embry
- Amanda Peet as Jackie
- Bruce Davison as Brigadier General Bill Marks
- Juan Carlos Hernández as Major James Hernandez
- Michael Gaston as Major Lucas Waldron
- Tom Bower as Special Agent Mullins
- Jude Ciccolella as Colonel Farrell
- Emilio Rivera as Salvadoran Man
- Michael Shannon as Troy Abbott
- Dendrie Taylor as Lola
- Paula Jai Parker as Gracie
- Dawn Hudson as Lieutenant Colonel LaPierre
- Julie Remala as Lisa Stenstrom

== Critical reception ==
Rotten Tomatoes reported a "rotten" 31% rating, based on 133 reviews, while Metacritic reported the film had an average score of 48 out of 100, based on 33 reviews.

A.O. Scott of The New York Times thought Ashley Judd and Morgan Freeman "make a muddled genre exercise seem a lot better than it is. Ms. Judd, always brisk and appealing, is capable of fine acting when the mood strikes [and] Mr. Freeman shows himself, once again, incapable of giving a bad performance." He added Carl Franklin's direction "is far from terrible, but it feels singularly uninspired, a flurry of fast, expository scenes and suspense-movie setups." He felt the plot twist "renders everything that came before completely nonsensical" and concluded, "If you figure it out, please let me know. On second thought, don't, but please drop a line to the folks at 20th Century Fox, since I'm sure they're just as baffled as the rest of us."

Roger Ebert of the Chicago Sun-Times rated the film three out of four stars and commented, "I do like the way director Carl Franklin and writers Yuri Zeltser and Cary Bickley . . . play both ends against the middle, so that the audience has abundant evidence to believe two completely conflicting theories of what actually happened . . . High Crimes works to keep us involved and make us care . . . The unfolding of various versions of the long-ago massacre is handled by Franklin in flashbacks that show how one camera angle can refute what another angle seems to prove. And if we feel, toward the end, a little whiplashed by the plot manipulations, well, that's what the movie promises and that's what the movie delivers."

Mick LaSalle of the San Francisco Chronicle said the film "has some faults, but it manages to keep its audience either angry or jumpy from start to finish . . . The dramatic focus of High Crimes gets a bit fuzzy in the last half hour - it starts to feel as if some scenes get replayed. Still, the scenes are never dull, and the movie recovers for the big finish. Only one thing is lacking throughout, not a big thing, but big enough to mention. We keep hearing about what great lawyers Claire and Grimes are, but there's no great courtroom scene. In that, High Crimes is too much like real life. It gives us court with no courtroom fireworks."

Michael O'Sullivan of The Washington Post said the film "satisfies a hunger for the basics: a decent mystery to chew on, a bit of juicy suspense, maybe a plot twist as garnish. The fare is all on the standard menu, but it goes down well just the same. Chalk that up to a cast the director can trust enough to step out of the way and let do their jobs . . . And yes, there's a twist ending, but don't kid yourself that you won't see it coming. Surprising? Maybe not. Satisfying? Not half as much as watching Freeman and Judd, two compelling performers who seem to enjoy each other's company almost as much as we do."

Robert Koehler of Variety called the film "utterly conventional" and Ashley Judd's performance "so resolutely humorless and businesslike that Freeman's gruffly affectionate warmth becomes doubly valuable, though not nearly enough to lend this generic project any special character. Most disillusioning is how director Carl Franklin, once known for tense storytelling and unpredictable characters, goes about his task here with a visible lack of inspiration . . . The screenwriting team of Yuri Zeltser and Cary Bickley has tweaked Joseph Finder's novel considerably . . . Character alterations, refinements, re-locations and plot substitutions produce a rabbit's warren full of holes in an almost laughably complex plot. By the time the third act exhaustedly appears, it's hardly a wonder that some major characters have no idea where other major characters are, or what they're doing."

== Awards and nominations ==
Morgan Freeman was nominated for the NAACP Image Award for Outstanding Actor in a Motion Picture but lost to Denzel Washington in John Q, the actor's fourth consecutive win in this category.

== Home media ==
20th Century Fox Home Entertainment released the Region 1 DVD on August 31, 2004. The film is in anamorphic widescreen format with audio tracks in English, Spanish, and French and subtitles in English and Spanish. Bonus features include commentary by director Carl Franklin and six featurettes about the making of the film.

High Crimes is also available on Blu-ray Disc on September 1, 2009.
