= Blue Peter Summer Expedition =

The Blue Peter Summer Expedition was a yearly tradition in which the presenters of the BBC children's TV programme Blue Peter go to a foreign country and experience the culture and film special reports from that country, which are broadcast over several weeks in September and October. The first expedition was held in 1965 in Norway, and they continued to go somewhere every year until 2012.

The Summer Expedition was traditionally announced on the last programme of the series which is usually towards the end of June. From 1971, the highlights of the expedition were shown as special programmes the following summer under the title Blue Peter Flies The World.

In 2012, with the series being broadcast all year round, the summer expedition was changed. It has been renamed the "Blue Peter Road Trip" and had purpose for going to a country(s). For the 2012 road trip, the presenters visited Poland and Ukraine because of the Euro 2012 games. The road trip was filmed over the course of one or two weeks. These would then be made as films for the live show and special programmes as usual. The expedition was abandoned after 2012.

To date, the Blue Peter team has visited the following countries:

- 1965 – Norway
- 1966 – Singapore and Borneo (without John Noakes)
- 1967 – Jamaica and New York City
- 1968 – Morocco
- 1969 – Ceylon
- 1970 – Mexico
- 1971 – Iceland, Norway and Denmark without Valerie Singleton
- 1972 – Fiji, Tonga and San Francisco
- 1973 – Ivory Coast
- 1974 – Thailand
- 1975 – Turkey
- 1976 – Brunei
- 1977 – Brazil
- 1978 – United States
- 1979 – Egypt
- 1980 – Malaysia
- 1981 – Japan
- 1982 – Canada
- 1983 – Sri Lanka
- 1984 – Kenya
- 1985 – Australia
- 1986 – no trip, due to budget cuts
- 1987 – Soviet Union
- 1988 – West Coast of the United States (without Mark Curry)
- 1989 – Zimbabwe (without Caron Keating)
- 1990 – The Caribbean
- 1991 – Japan (without Yvette Fielding)
- 1992 – Hungary with Anthea Turner, and New Zealand with Yvette Fielding
- 1993 – Argentina (without John Leslie)
- 1994 – New England, United States
- 1995 – South Africa
- 1996 – Hong Kong and China
- 1997 – Canada
- 1998 – Mexico
- 1999 – Australia
- 2000 – Spain
- 2001 – Vietnam
- 2002 – Morocco
- 2003 – Brazil
- 2004 – India
- 2005 – Japan (without Liz Barker)
- 2006 – Southern United States
- 2007 – Bolivia
- 2008 – Alaska (with new presenters)
- 2009 – Turkey
- 2010 – Italy
- 2011 – no Summer Expedition, due to move to Salford
- 2012 – Poland and Ukraine

== Bibliography ==
- Marson, Richard (2008). Blue Peter 50th Anniversary. Hamlyn. ISBN 978-0-600-61793-8.
