= Michael Papas =

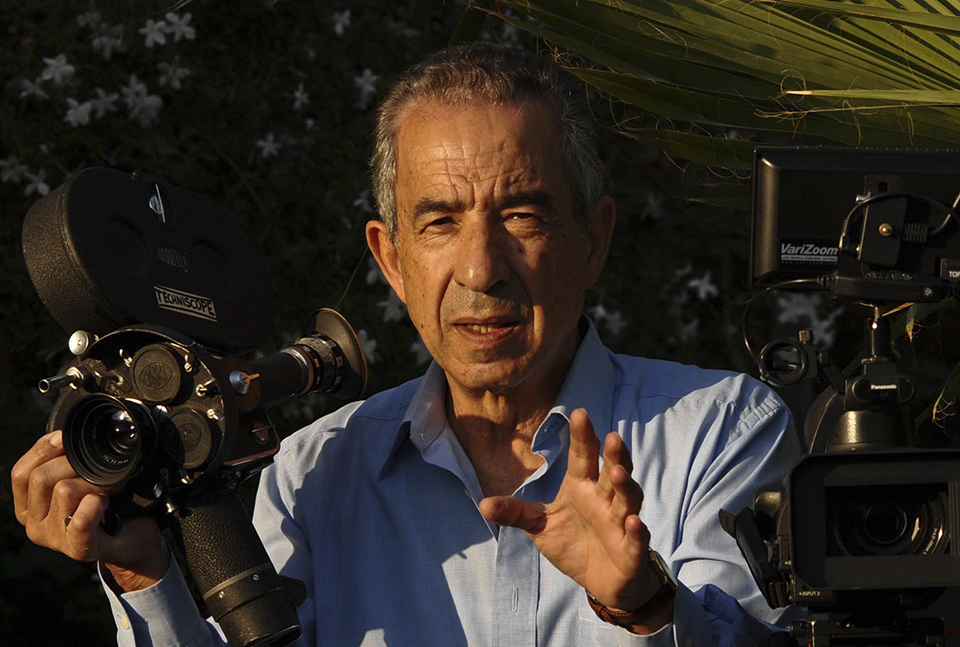
- Papas in 2010.
- Born: Nicosia, Cyprus
- Occupations: Film director, producer, screenwriter
- Years active: 1966–present
- Spouse: Susan Papas
- Children: 1
- Website: michaelpapas.com

Michael Papas is a Greek-Cypriot independent filmmaker working in England and Cyprus. He is best known for writing, directing and producing The Private Right, The Lifetaker and Tomorrow's Warrior.

== Career ==
=== The Private Right (1966) ===
In 1966, Papas made his feature film debut as producer, writer and director of the politically controversial, critically acclaimed The Private Right. Set in Cyprus and London, it concerns a group of Cypriot guerrilla rebels engaged in the uprising against the British colonials. After being captured, a Cypriot guerrilla leader is tortured by a fellow Cypriot who is collaborating with the British army. Years later, the victim travels to London to seek revenge against his torturer. The Private Right premiered at the 1966 London Film Festival and opened at theatres in England in 1967. Papas withdrew the film from competition at the 1967 Sydney Film Festival because of cuts demanded by the Commonwealth Censor Board.

The Sunday Times called the film "a striking debut." Sight & Sound called it "astonishing for a first feature" and added, "Papas achieves a heraldic theatrical power." The British Film Institute's Monthly Film Bulletin called Papas "a director eager to experiment with film form, and more important able to do it with authority." The Times said Papas "manages his box of tricks with striking skill and control, and the image he presents of a weirdly unfamiliar nightmare London… is powerfully haunting."

=== The Lifetaker (1975) ===
Papas's 1975 English film The Lifetaker stars Terence Morgan as a deceived husband who engages his wife (Lea Dregorn) and her young lover (Peter Duncan) in a series of deadly games. It had its world premiere at the International Film Festival Rotterdam, where it was both lauded and criticised for its controversial themes of sex and violence and the corruption of youth. According to Papas, the film was scheduled to be released across the UK, but the managing director of EMI distribution cancelled the release after viewing the completed film due to its controversial themes.

In Offbeat, a 2012 collection on British cinema edited by Julian Upton, The Lifetaker is called a “stylish and erotically charged tale of obsession” that is “not only the quintessence of the kind of film they don’t make anymore, but is also radically unlike the kind of film they made even then.” Upton praised the film for its “consistent use of inch-perfect composition, bold camera moves, sumptuous colour schemes and daring set pieces.”

=== Tomorrow's Warrior (1981) ===
Papas’s 1981 film Tomorrow’s Warrior, shot in the UK and Cyprus and also known by its Greek title Avrianos Polemistis, is based on true events from the 1974 Turkish invasion of Cyprus and stars Christos Zannidis. The story concerns a young Cypriot boy and his family who flee their village in advance of a Turkish invasion, struggling to survive in a Greek refugee camp. The Sunday Times called the initial invasion sequence a "stunning, mind-bending centre piece" that "has few equals anywhere in the cinema." The New Statesman wrote that such sequences "portray man's reasonless inhumanity to man everywhere."

=== Little Odysseus and the Cyclops (2011) ===
In 2011, Papas returned with Little Odysseus and the Cyclops and Secret Paths, which were filmed one after the other. Little Odysseus and the Cyclops is a modern day retelling of a story from Homer's The Odyssey. The fantasy adventure film premiered at Papas's Acropole Cinemas in Nicosia.

== Personal life ==
Papas was born in Nicosia, Cyprus. His wife, Susan Papas, co-produced his later films with him. Together they own and run the Acropole Cinemas in Nicosia, which they opened in 1995. His son, Minos Papas, is a New York-based filmmaker who was the director of photography on Little Odysseus and the Cyclops, Secret Paths, and Take Me Home.

== Filmography ==
Year	Title	Credited as
1966	The Private Right	Writer/director/producer
1972	Solitaire	Director
1975	The Lifetaker	Writer/director/producer
1981	Tomorrow's Warrior (aka Avrianos Polemistis)	Writer/director/producer
2011	Little Odysseus and the Cyclops	Writer/director/producer
2013	Secret Paths	Writer/director/producer
