= Janet Yang =

American film producer

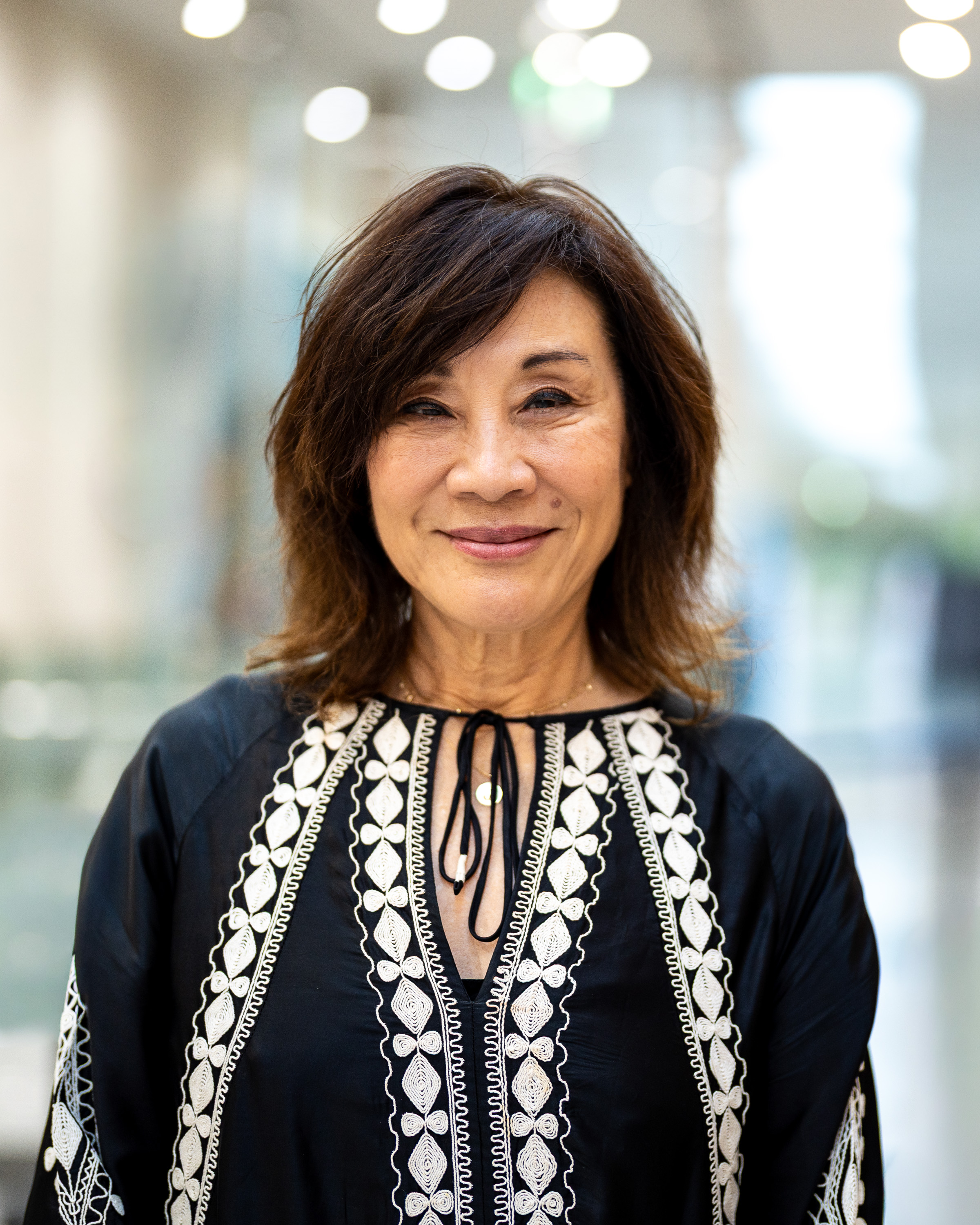
- Janet Yang at ACFM 2025 in Busan, South Korea
- Born: July 13, 1956 (age 70); New York City, New York, U.S.
- Education: Brown University (BA); Columbia University (MBA)
- Occupation: Film producer
- Years active: 1985–present
- Children: 1

Chinese name
- Traditional Chinese: 楊燕子
- Simplified Chinese: 杨燕子
Transcriptions
Standard Mandarin
- Hanyu Pinyin: Yáng Yàn zǐ

Janet Yang (born July 13, 1956) is an American film producer who served as president of the Academy of Motion Picture Arts and Sciences from 2022 to 2025. Yang has been credited on films and television including The Joy Luck Club, The People vs. Larry Flynt, Dark Matter, Indictment: The McMartin Trial, Zero Effect, Shanghai Calling, High Crimes, and the Academy Award-nominated animated film Over the Moon.

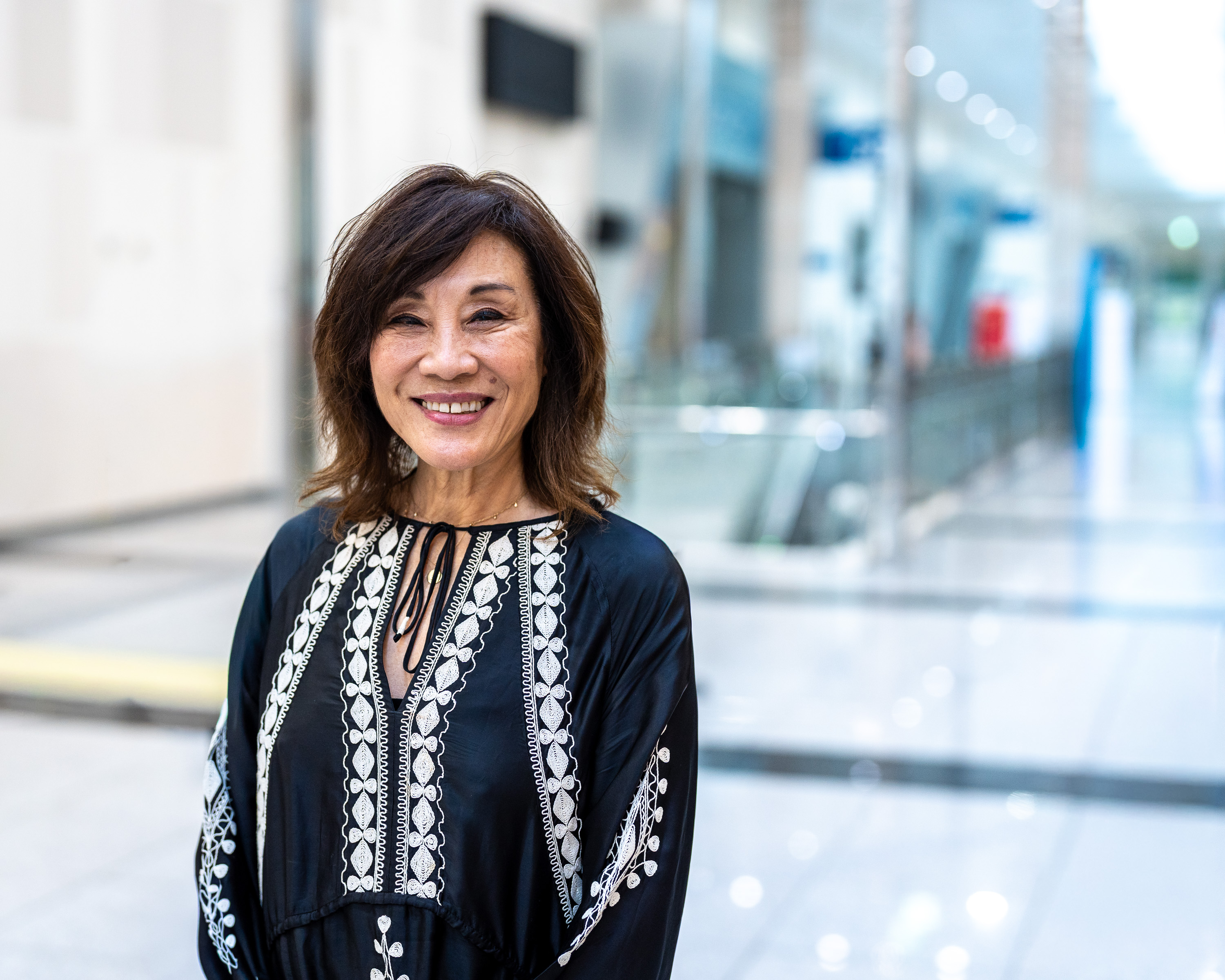
Janet Yang at ACFM 2025 in Busan, South Korea

== Early life and education ==
Janet Yang was born on July 13, 1956, in Queens, New York. Her parents immigrated to the U.S. Her mother was from Hunan, and her father from Shanghai. Yang attended Phillips Exeter Academy, then Brown University, where she focused on Chinese Studies, followed by an MBA from Columbia University.

== Career ==
Yang was president of World Entertainment in San Francisco. She revived this small, local distributor of Hong Kong films, expanded it into exhibition, and was able to garner exclusive representation rights in North America for all films produced in the People's Republic of China. These films included filmmakers Zhang Yimou and Chen Kaige, among others.

Yang's first producing effort was the documentary film, East to West: America Through the Eyes of a Chinese. Yang was hired by several major studios to re-introduce American cinema to the Chinese marketplace after a long hiatus. From 1985 to 1987, she represented three major studios — Universal, Paramount, and MGM/United Artists — and was able to broker the first sale of American studio movies to China since 1949.

In 1985, she was hired to be Steven Spielberg's eyes and ears in China for the filming of the historic production of Empire of the Sun, responsible for liaising with both national and local levels of the Chinese government for its largest production to date. She then segued into a production position at Universal, supervising Spielberg's Amblin account.

From 1989 to 1996, Yang served as president of Ixtlan, the company she formed with Academy Award-winning Writer/Director Oliver Stone, spearheading all aspects of the company's development and production. At Ixtlan, she produced The People vs. Larry Flynt. The film won the 1996 Golden Globe Awards for Best Director and Best Screenplay, and garnered Academy Award nominations for Best Director and Best Actor. Yang also served as executive producer of the groundbreaking film The Joy Luck Club, based on the best-selling novel by Amy Tan and directed by Wayne Wang. Yang executive produced Indictment: The McMartin Trial for which she won both Emmy and Golden Globe Awards for Best Made for Television Movie.

Following her seven-year stint at Ixtlan, she formed the Manifest Film Company with Lisa Henson. Manifest Productions include Carl Franklin's High Crimes, with Morgan Freeman; The Weight of Water, from Academy-Award-winning director Kathryn Bigelow and starring Sean Penn; Zero Effect, starring Bill Pullman and Ben Stiller; and Savior starring Dennis Quaid. Yang also served as the Managing Director in charge of creative content and production at Tang Media Partners.

Yang produced the acclaimed film Dark Matter, directed by Chen Shi-Zheng and starring Chinese actor Liu Ye and Meryl Streep. Dark Matter premiered at the 2007 Sundance Film Festival and won the Alfred P. Sloan Prize. In 2009, Yang was sought out by Disney Studios to produce High School Musical for Chinese audiences. Her last narrative feature was Shanghai Calling, a romantic comedy set in contemporary Shanghai. Yang was as an Executive Producer on the film, Documented, written and directed by the Pulitzer Prize-winning journalist, Jose Antonio Vargas. In 2020, Yang produced Over The Moon for Netflix.

On May 3, 2020, Janet Yang served as a guest speaker at Asia Society's "Stand Against Racism in the Time of COVID" forum, alongside guests such as Los Angeles Mayor Eric Garcetti and Representative Ted Lieu.

On July 19, 2022, Yang was feted at the Academy Museum of Motion Pictures with a pillar named in her honor. She is the first Asian American woman to have a pillar at the museum. On August 2, 2022, at a meeting of the Board of Governors, Yang was elected as president of the Academy of Motion Picture Arts and Sciences, replacing outgoing President David Rubin, who was ineligible to be re-elected. This made her the first Asian American President of the Academy of Motion Picture Arts and Sciences, and the fourth woman to hold that position.

In July 2025, Yang partnered with South Korean entertainment company CJ ENM, Miky Lee, and Dominic Ng to oversee a new label called First Light StoryHouse, which is dedicated to Asian and Asian American storytelling for major studios and streamers.

=== Membership and community participation ===
Yang is the president of the Academy of Motion Picture Arts and Sciences; a member of the Committee of 100, an organization of prominent Chinese-Americans; an advisory board member of Asia Society Southern California; the National Committee on US-China Relations and an advisory board member of CAPE, the Coalition of Asian-Pacific Americans in Entertainment. She has taught producing at the Sundance Institute and the Independent Feature Project. She is involved with a number of arts, community and political organizations. She is a co-founder of Gold House, a collective of influential Asians across entertainment, technology, lifestyle, and business. She has also been recognized with a Presidential Fellowship at Loyola Marymount University.

== Filmography ==
Year	Film	Role
1984	East to West: America Through the Eyes of Chinese	Producer
1987	Empire of the Sun	Production Advisor
1991	Iron Maze	Associate Producer
1992	Zebrahead	Executive Producer
1992	South Central	Producer
1993	The Joy Luck Club	Executive Producer
1994	The New Age	Co-Producer
1995	Indictment: The McMartin Trial	Executive Producer
1995	Killer: A Journal of Murder	Producer
1996	The People vs. Larry Flynt	Producer
1998	Zero Effect	Producer
1998	Savior	Producer
2002	The Weight of Water	Producer
2002	High Crimes	Producer
2004	Kingdom Hospital	Producer
2007	Dark Matter	Producer
2008	Year of the Fish	Executive Producer
2009	Qi Chuan Xu Xu	Executive Producer
2010	Chinese High School Musical	Producer
2012	Shanghai Calling	Producer
2013	One Night Surprise	Producer
2014	Documented	Executive Producer
2020	Over The Moon	Executive Producer
2023	Take Me Home	Executive Producer
2026	Take Me Home	Executive Producer
2026	Everest: The Other Side	Producer

== Awards ==
Year	Award	Work	Organization
1993	The Golden Ring Award for Honoring Artistic Excellence		The Asian American Arts Foundation
1994	Media Achievement Award		MANAA
1994	Outstanding Corporate Executive		Asian Business League
1994	Enzian Award for Creative Achievement		Florida Film Festival
1995	Primetime Emmy Award for Outstanding Made for Television Movie	Indictment: The McMartin Trial	The Television Academy
1995	Golden Globe Award for Best Miniseries or Motion Picture Made for Television	Indictment: The McMartin Trial	The Hollywood Foreign Press Association
1996	30th Anniversary Visionary Award for Outstanding Artistic Achievement for the Asian Pacific American Community		EWP (East West Players)
2005	Asian American Achievement Award for Distinguished Movie Producer		OCA (Organization of Chinese Americans, Inc.)
2013	Golden Angel Award for Best US-China Co-Production Film	Shanghai Calling	Chinese American Film Festival
2013	Audrey Women of Influence Award		KoreAm Journal and Audrey Magazine

Non-profit organization positions
Preceded by David Rubin	President of the Academy of Motion Picture Arts and Sciences; 2022–2025	Succeeded by Lynette Howell Taylor
