= Did You See...? =

- The title sequence of abacus cube like TV screens resolved to reveal the name of the programme.
- Country of origin: United Kingdom

Original release
- Network: BBC Two
- Release: 1980 – 1993

Did You See...? is a British television review programme which was broadcast on BBC2 from 1980 to 1993. The programme took a look back at the week's television with a discussion between the presenter and three guests. In the first run there was also a pre-filmed last segment on an aspect of TV by an independent reporter. The presenters of Did You See...? were the journalist and broadcaster Sir Ludovic Kennedy, who fronted the programme from 1980 to 1988, and Jeremy Paxman, who fronted the programme from 1991 to 1993. Sarah Dunant hosted the show while Kennedy was absent due to ill health. The format was to review the week's TV highlights, followed by an in depth review and critique of three selected shows with a panel of three public figures (not necessarily 'celebrities').

Significant editions of Did You See...? include a 1986 edition which featured a look at the history of Blue Peter in which former presenter Peter Purves recalled that on the death of Blue Peter pet parrot Joey, the show's editor Biddy Baxter called him in floods of tears. He speculated that had he himself died, Baxter would have been far less upset and would not have been likely to be calling his co-presenters telling them that he had died. This particular feature was one of several that was later expanded and extracted from the series, shown in a stand-alone documentary format. Sea of Faith, a 1984 documentary series examining the history of Christianity in the modern world, was featured on another edition. Several of the features were dedicated to Doctor Who. In 1982, there was an item on The Cybermen, to mark their first appearance in the series in seven years. A later feature took a general look at monsters from the series.
