= Emergency (2022 film) =

2022 film by Carey Williams

- Release poster
- Directed by: Carey Williams
- Written by: K.D. Dávila
- Based on: Emergency by: Carey Williams; K.D. Dávila
- Produced by: Isaac Klausner; John Fischer; Marty Bowen
- Starring: RJ Cyler; Donald Elise Watkins; Sebastian Chacon; Sabrina Carpenter
- Cinematography: Michael Dallatorre
- Edited by: Lam T. Nguyen
- Music by: Rene G. Boscio
- Production company: Temple Hill Entertainment
- Distributed by: Amazon Studios
- Release dates: January 20, 2022 (Sundance); May 20, 2022 (United States)
- Running time: 105 minutes
- Country: United States
- Language: English

Emergency is a 2022 American thriller comedy-drama film directed by Carey Williams and written by K.D. Dávila, based on their 2018 short film of the same name. It stars RJ Cyler, Donald Elise Watkins, and Sebastian Chacon as three college students who must weigh the pros and cons of calling the police when faced with an unexpected situation.

The film had its world premiere at the 38th Sundance Film Festival on January 20, 2022, where Dávila won the Waldo Salt Screenwriting Award. It began a limited theatrical release in the United States on May 20, 2022, followed by its streaming release on Amazon Prime Video on May 27, 2022. It received positive reviews from critics, who particularly praised Dávila's screenplay. The film was nominated for Best First Screenplay at the 38th Independent Spirit Awards, while Williams earned nominations for Outstanding Independent Film and Outstanding Emerging Director at the 23rd Black Reel Awards.

== Plot ==
Best friends and college students Sean and Kunle prepare to become the first Black men to complete the "Legendary Tour", a practice of visiting seven fraternity parties in one night. Along with their friend and roommate Carlos, they discover the unconscious body of Emma, an underage white teenager, in their living room. Sean argues that if they call the police, the color of their skin would be enough to raise suspicion. Kunle convinces the group to take Emma to a hospital 10 minutes away. Meanwhile, Emma's sister Maddy and her friends Alice and Rafael start to look for her.

The three friends first try an alternate option—dumping Emma off outside of one of the parties. As Kunle leaves them to be the lookout, an incident leads several students to chase him off the property and throw objects at their car, shattering a tail light. Maddy uses a phone tracker app to find Emma's location. Carlos accidentally gives Emma a bottle of alcoholic "Death Punch", mistaking it for a sports drink. Sean is unable to convince his relative to lend him his car. Emma regains consciousness and begins to scream when she sees she is inside a stranger's vehicle. She breaks Carlos' nose and kicks Kunle in the face, causing them to crash the car. Emma then runs off into the woods and the three of them chase after her. They find her passed out in a tree and bring her back into their vehicle as Maddy, Alice, and Rafael find them.

Maddy attacks Sean and Kunle with a branch and accidentally pepper sprays herself. Carlos and Rafael, who reveal they are cousins, appease the rest of the group and explain the situation, though Maddy remains skeptical, asking Emma if any of them assaulted her. Carlos asks how they were able to track Emma, and Maddy reveals that her phone was tucked into her bra, convincing the group they were truly trying to help her. A scared Sean abandons the group and goes to the "Underground", the last frat party of the "Legendary Tour". Emma begins to overdose as Carlos drives everyone to the hospital. As Kunle performs CPR to save Emma's life, the group is chased by the police, who believe they have kidnapped Emma. They are stopped by the police just as they make it to the emergency room. The police point a gun at Kunle, the only Black man in the car. Alice later explains the situation to the police. Kunle and Carlos are allowed to leave. A white police officer tells Kunle that they should have just called the police in the first place. Sean and Kunle reunite and make up.

The morning after the events, Emma and Maddy bring a gift basket to the boys' house and Emma apologizes before Maddy tells her to wait outside. As Maddy begins to read a handwritten apology about involving the police, Kunle shuts the door in her face. While playing a round of Jenga, Sean notices Kunle showing symptoms of post-traumatic stress disorder at the sound of distant sirens.

== Cast ==
- RJ Cyler as Sean
- Donald Elise Watkins as Kunle
- Sebastian Chacon as Carlos
- Sabrina Carpenter as Maddy
- Maddie Nichols as Emma
- Madison Thompson as Alice
- Diego Abraham as Rafael
- Summer Madison as Asa
- Gillian Rabin as Bianca
- Patrick Lamont Jr. as Malik
- Robert Hamilton III as Terence
- Melanie Jeffcoat as Karen

== Production ==
The short film Emergency won the Special Jury Prize at the 2018 Sundance Film Festival and the Grand Jury Prize at the 2018 SXSW. K.D. Dávila's screenplay made the 2020 Black List of most popular un-produced scripts from up-and-coming screenwriters. The project was in development with Temple Hill Entertainment and Amazon Studios. In April 2021, it was announced RJ Cyler, Sabrina Carpenter, Donald Elise Watkins, Sebastian Chacon, Maddie Nichols, Madison Thompson, Diego Abraham, and Melanie Jeffcoat were added to the cast. Principal photography took place in spring 2021.

== Reception ==
On the review aggregator website Rotten Tomatoes, 92% of 155 critics' reviews are positive, with an average rating of 7.3/10. The website's consensus reads: "Taking the form of a classic college comedy while adding some socially relevant function, Emergency is as smart and disturbing as it is hilarious." Metacritic, which uses a weighted average, assigned the film a score of 73 out of 100, based on 27 critics, indicating "generally favorable" reviews.
