= Liz Sargent =

American filmmaker

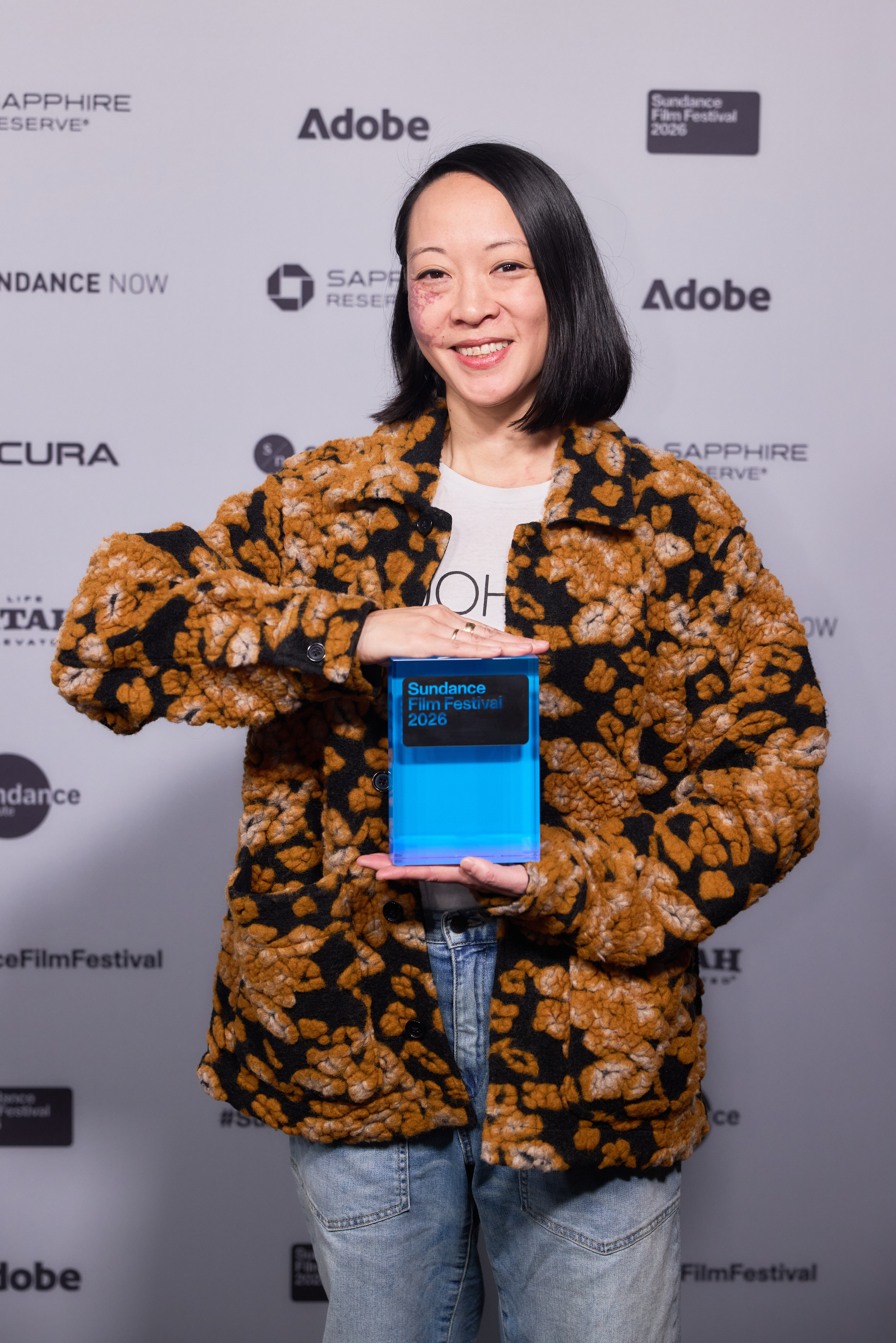
- Sargent in 2026
- Born: South Korea
- Education: University of North Carolina School of the Arts
- Occupations: Director, writer, producer
- Years active: 2015–present
- Spouse: Minos Papas

Liz Sargent is a Korean-American film director, writer, and producer. Her feature film debut Take Me Home, based on her short film of the same name, premiered in U.S. Dramatic Competition at the 2026 Sundance Film Festival, where she won the Waldo Salt Screenwriting Award.

== Early life and education ==
Sargent was born in South Korea and raised in the suburbs of Chicago as the middle of eleven children - she was one of seven children adopted by Bob and Joan Sargent, who also have four biological children. She studied modern dance at the University of North Carolina School of the Arts.

== Career ==
Sargent began her career in the mid-2000s in New York City as a modern dance choreographer and in experimental theater, where she created performance installations at the Lower Manhattan Cultural Council and Danspace Project. The New York Times described her debut show Returning as "both lovely and disturbing."

She transitioned into filmmaking with her debut narrative short film Strangers' Reunion (2019), about an adoptee reunion. It was one of five films chosen by Ritz-Carlton and Hearst to be produced by RSA Hong Kong, with mentorship by Mike Figgis. Her 2019 experimental short documentary about the Lower Manhattan Cultural Center's River to River Festival, Slow Down: River to River, features the work of Yoko Ono and Pam Tanowitz. It won a New York Emmy Award for Arts Program/Special. Her 2021 short film Dancers (Slightly Out of Shape) documents Tanowitz and her dancers rehearsing for a show during the Covid-19 pandemic. She won the Korean American Stories ROAR Story Slam award in 2022 for her story "Angel's Kiss," about growing up with a port-wine stain and being told it may have played a factor in her adoption.

Sargent's narrative short film Take Me Home, loosely based on her family situation, is about two estranged sisters, one of whom is cognitively disabled, who must learn to communicate after their mother's death. Sargent cast her younger sister Anna and their mother Joan to play versions of themselves, alongside Jeena Yi as the older sister. The film was nominated for Best Short Film at the 2023 Sundance Film Festival and Best Narrative Short at the 2023 South By Southwest Film Festival. It won the Grand Jury Prize at the American Cinematheque's 2024 Proof Film Festival, the 2023 deadCenter Film Festival's Special Jury Short award, and Best Short at the 2023 Los Angeles Asian Pacific Film Festival. It also won the inaugural Julia S. Gouw Short Film Challenge for Asian American and Pacific Islander Women and Non-Binary Filmmakers. Along with her sisters Anna and Molly, Sargent appeared at the White House on June 18, 2024, for a screening of the film as part of a program commemorating the 25th anniversary of Olmstead v. L.C., a case that affirmed the right of disabled people to receive state-funded support and services.

On June 21, 2024, it was announced that Take Me Home would be adapted into a feature, with the national advocacy organization Caring Across Generations onboard as a financier, along with River Road Entertainment, Cinereach, and Cyprian Films, New York. The feature script was a 2023 SFFILM Rainin Grant recipient. On June 5, 2025, the Tribeca Festival announced Sargent as the 2025 AT&T Untold Stories $1 million award recipient, to help fund Sargent's feature directorial debut.

The feature, also called Take Me Home, wrapped shooting in Florida in September 2025, and stars Sargent's sister Anna Sargent alongside Victor Slezak, Ali Ahn, Marceline Hugot, and Shane Harper. It expands on the short film of the same name by bringing in a father character and touching on the caregiving side of Anna's story, and struggles with the American healthcare system. Lisa Kennedy of Variety called it "a deeply felt examination of the challenges so many face when familial love is swamped by economic reality," while Sheri Linden of The Hollywood Reporter wrote that the film "balances dark truths with charm and humor." It premiered in U.S. Competition at the 2026 Sundance Film Festival, with Sargent winning the festival's Waldo Salt Screenwriting Award. Take Me Home had its international premiere at the 2026 Berlin International Film Festival. Sargent won the Lumen Lighthouse Award for her work on the film.

Sargent is a part of NBU Launch's 2024-26 class for its TV Directors Program. She is also a Ryan Murphy Half Initiative Mentee and AICP Mentee. She is an executive producer on Minos Papas's 2026 feature film Motherwitch.

== Personal life ==
Sargent is married to filmmaker Minos Papas.

== Filmography ==
=== Feature films ===
Year	Title	Director	Writer	Producer
2026	Take Me Home	Yes	Yes	Yes
2026	Motherwitch	No	No	Executive

=== Short films ===
Year	Title	Director	Writer	Producer
2016	Tango on the Balcony	No	No	Yes
2019	Strangers' Reunion	Yes	Yes	No
2019	Slow Down: River to River	Yes	No	Yes
2020	The Harvester Generation	No	No	Yes
2021	Dancers (Slightly Out of Shape)	Yes	No	No
2021	Every Moment Alters	Yes	No	No
2022	A Distance	No	No	Yes
2023	Take Me Home	Yes	Yes	Yes

=== Television ===
Year	Title	Director	Writer	Producer
2021	Flowstate	Yes	Yes	Yes
