= Simon Groom =

British TV presenter, producer and director

- Born: 12 August 1950 (age 75); Chesterfield, Derbyshire, England
- Education: Herbert Strutt Grammar School, Derbyshire; University of Birmingham
- Occupations: Television presenter Journalist; Producer
- Television: Blue Peter (1978–1986)

Simon Groom (born 12 August 1950) is a British producer and director. He was a presenter of Blue Peter from 1978 to 1986.

== Early life ==
Groom was born in Chesterfield in Derbyshire, and was brought up on a farm in Dethick, which he later often visited for Blue Peter reports. He was educated at Herbert Strutt Grammar School in Belper, Derbyshire, followed by the University of Birmingham.

== Career ==
=== Blue Peter ===
Groom worked briefly as an English teacher, before becoming a disc jockey and joining Blue Peter in 1978. Groom's co-presenters on Blue Peter were Lesley Judd, John Noakes, Christopher Wenner, Tina Heath, Peter Duncan, Sarah Greene, Janet Ellis and Michael Sundin.

Groom became known among the programme's production team for his dry humour and ability to ad lib innuendo in his broadcasting. One such statement was at the end of a piece on a replacement door knocker at Durham Cathedral, declaring "what a beautiful pair of knockers".

=== Other work ===
After leaving Blue Peter, Groom hosted a morning show on BBC Radio Bedfordshire. In 1992, he released a cover version of Elvis Presley's hit "Can't Help Falling in Love" on his own record label. Groom produced his first TV documentary, Angels & Devils, a critically acclaimed biopic of film director Ken Russell, reviewed as 'Pick of the Day' in both The Daily Telegraph and The Guardian. Groom also wrote, directed and produced A Steamy Affair: the Story of the Flying Scotsman for Channel 4. His other television documentaries include Bucking Mad, the story of an English rodeo rider, and Full Circle: the Saving of Derby's Roundhouse, both broadcast by the BBC.

Groom has also produced and presented documentaries for BBC Radio Four, including George Oliver: A Man For All Seasons, the story of a Bedfordshire gamekeeper; Peak Park Pressures (about Britain's first national park); and Ferry Across the Mekong: two Sony Award-nominated thirty minute programmes in which Groom makes a return trip to Cambodia. In 1979, he was one of the earliest Western journalists to enter the country, following the end of Pol Pot's regime.

Groom's documentary The Flying Scotsman: A Rail Romance, was transmitted on BBC Two in March 2013. The 60 minute programme has since been repeated twice on the channel.

== Personal life ==
Groom has worked as an ambassador for the city of Derby, and in 2010 was given an honorary degree by the University of Derby in recognition of his contribution to broadcasting.
