= Take Me Home Tonight =

Take Me Home Tonight may refer to:

- "Take Me Home Tonight" (song), a 1986 song by Eddie Money, featuring Ronnie Spector
- Take Me Home Tonight (film), a 2011 American film, starring Topher Grace

== See also ==
- "Fake Me Home Tonight", an episode of Glory Daze
