= Duncan Dares =

British children's television series

- Genre: Children's Documentary
- Presented by: Peter Duncan
- Country of origin: United Kingdom
- No. of seasons: 2
- No. of episodes: 12

Production
- Producers: Roy Thompson (series 1); Rob Benfield (series 2)

Original release
- Network: BBC Television
- Release: April 24, 1985 – June 2, 1987

Duncan Dares is a BBC Television children's programme that was first broadcast between 24 April 1985 and 2 June 1987.

The series was presented by Peter Duncan who had been a presenter on Blue Peter in the early 1980s. Each episode had an adventure-based outdoor theme in keeping with Duncan's reputation on Blue Peter as a man of action.

== Episodes ==
=== Series 1 (1985) ===
No. overall	No. in series	Title	Directed by	Original release date
1	1	"Stunt Man"	Rob Benfield	24 April 1985
Jumping 40 feet from a roof to escape enemy agents is just one stunt performed by Peter Duncan. Crashing a car at high speed and being set on fire are part of the rest of the day in the life of Special Agent Duncan.
2	2	"Dragon Boat Races"	Rob Benfield	1 May 1985
Travelling half-way around the world to be thrashed by the Far Easterns at their national sport seems an odd assignment for Peter Duncan, but after weeks of strenuous training with the men of the North East Amateur Rowing Club, they were ready for allcomers and off to exotic Hong Kong.
3	3	"Commando Yomp"	Alex Leger	8 May 1985
The 30-mile speed march is a legend in the Royal Marines. It's a race against the clock across some of the roughest country in Britain and the climax to a week of arduous muscle-sapping commando tests. The Royal Marine Commandos made a famous 'Yomp' or march to Port Stanley in The Falklands.
4	4	"Climber"	Rob Benfield	15 May 1985
On only his third climb, Peter Duncan tries the Old Man of Stoer. It's only 40 metres shorter than its famous cousin at Hoy, and to get to it involves an icy swim across a channel. With Everest mountaineer Doug Scott as his guide, Peter climbs up one of the most difficult and beautiful rocks in Britain, which only 20 years ago was considered unclimbable.
5	5	"Water Beetle"	Rob Benfield	22 May 1985
Crossing the notorious Irish Sea in an old car is a real dare for Peter Duncan and co-driver Steve Good when the weather forecasters get it wrong and they encounter 20-foot waves in mid-channel en route to Ireland. Why didn't they take the ferry?
6	6	"Tight Rope Walker"	Rob Benfield	29 May 1985
'..It takes years of practice to become a tightrope walker....' How about six months? That was the challenge put to Peter in this Duncan Dares when he joined the world of the circus to display his brand new act on the high wire. Look! No net and no strings attached, but will he get across without falling?

=== Series 2 (1987) ===
No. overall	No. in series	Title	Directed by	Original release date
7	1	"Truck Racer"	Rob Benfield	28 April 1987
It's new, it's exciting, it's the fastest-growing motor-sport in Europe today - it's truck-racing! Peter has to learn to manoeuvre a 40-foot trailer backwards at 3mph before he's allowed to join top truck-racing drivers on the starting grid for a lOOmph battle of the giants, at one of the world's most famous racing tracks - The Paul Ricard Circuit in the south of France.
8	2	"Firefighter"	Alex Leger	5 May 1987
'Remember, remember, the fifth of November'.The 'towering inferno' and the 'rat run' are legendary in the London Fire Brigade, and are part of Peter Duncan's dare as he trains as a fireman. On bonfire night he joins 'White Watch' at Holloway fire station for a night of firefighting he will never forget.
9	3	"Survivor (Part One)"	Alex Leger	12 May 1987
Alone in the wilderness after an air crash - could you survive? In the first of two programmes Peter Duncan joins expert Lofty Wiseman, who says that with proper training and the will to continue, any fit person can survive. But solitude and lack of proper food make seven days seem like eternity to Peter as he learns that bull rushes are as nourishing as asparagus, and all you need to cross water safely is a plastic sack.
10	4	"Survivor (Part Two)"	Alex Leger	19 May 1987
After four days of living off the land, survival expert Lofty Wiseman and Peter Duncan join forces once more to leave Peter's forest shelter and march to the coast and safety. Weakened by lack of proper food and the walking, Peter learns that limpets and seaweed fill you up and wild strawberry roots are good for cleaning your teeth.
11	5	"Hang Glider Pilot"	Rob Benfield & Alex Leger	26 May 1987
Up and away! In this high-flying dare Peter Duncan becomes a hang-glider pilot and discovers the Blorenge - the highest hang-gliding site in South Wales.The spectacular views from its summit provide a test of nerve for Peter's first flight.
12	6	"What Is A Dare?"	Rob Benfield	2 June 1987
'Dear Peter, would you ... lie on a bed of nails? Wear a beard of bees? Walk over hot coals? Let a tarantula walk across your bare chest?' All these ideas came from Duncan Dares viewers who felt that up till now he was getting off lightly. Join Peter in the last programme of the series as he faces up to what the viewers think is daring.
