= John Noakes =

English TV presenter (1934–2017)

- Noakes with Shep
- Born: John Wallace Bottomley; 6 March 1934; Halifax, West Riding of Yorkshire, England
- Died: 28 May 2017 (aged 83); Palma de Mallorca, Spain
- Occupations: Actor, presenter, television personality
- Years active: 1965–2013
- Spouse: Vicky Noakes (m. 1963)
- Children: 1

John Noakes (born John Wallace Bottomley; 6 March 1934 – 28 May 2017) was an English television presenter and actor. He co-presented the BBC children's magazine programme Blue Peter in the 1960s and 1970s and is the show's longest-serving male presenter, with a tenure that lasted 12 years and six months.

== Early life ==
Noakes was born John Bottomley, at the Royal Halifax Infirmary in Halifax, West Riding of Yorkshire, to Sallie Hinchcliffe (née Hampson) and Arthur Wallace Bottomley. He was educated at Shelf Council School, in Shelf and then at Rishworth School near Halifax, where he excelled in cross country running and gymnastics. His parents divorced when he was nine and he went to live with his grandmother.

At the age of 16, Noakes joined the Royal Air Force as a mechanic. The following year, his mother married Canadian big band trumpeter Alfred "Alfie" Noakes (1903–1982) and John took his surname. He subsequently worked for BOAC as an aircraft engine fitter.

=== Acting ===
When Noakes decided to become an actor, he took lessons at London's Guildhall School of Music and Drama, which he paid for by doing a cleaning job and working as a hotel liftboy. He made his stage debut as a dog and a clown in a summer show with Cyril Fletcher. In 1964, he appeared in one episode of the television military police drama series Redcap.

After spending six months in the Broadway production of Arnold Wesker's Chips with Everything, Noakes moved back to the UK to work in rep in Surrey where he met his wife-to-be, Vicky. Noakes recreated his role as Whitey Richardson in the 1963 BBC television adaptation of Chips with Everything. He followed this with the role of Anselme Popinot in mini-series The Rise and Fall of César Birotteau on BBC2, a four-part dramatisation broadcast in June 1965. His last dramatic role on television before joining Blue Peter was in an episode of the crime series Mogul (later called The Troubleshooters), starring Barry Foster and Geoffrey Keen, broadcast on BBC1 in August 1965.

== Blue Peter ==
=== Presenter ===
Noakes got the opportunity to join Blue Peter when producer Biddy Baxter needed a third presenter to join Christopher Trace and Valerie Singleton after the show went from a weekly to a twice-weekly format. Baxter noticed Noakes at the Phoenix Theatre in Leicester where he was playing Willie Mossop in the play Hobson's Choice. Noakes joined Blue Peter as a presenter on 30 December 1965. Peter Purves replaced Trace in 1967, creating the "Val, John and Pete" line-up, often referred to as "the dream team", which lasted until 1972. When Singleton began to diversify her television career, former Young Generation dancer Lesley Judd joined the team. At a time when most BBC presenters spoke with Received Pronunciation (RP), Noakes's Yorkshire accent was a novelty.

As a Blue Peter presenter, Noakes usually fulfilled the role of action man in the series. Highlights included changing the billboard name for the 1971 premiere of Bedknobs and Broomsticks in London's Leicester Square, free-fall parachuting with the RAF's Flying Falcons display team and bobsleighing (his sled hit a hole in the ice and turned over, injuring him). After a 5-mile (8 km) free-fall with the RAF in 1973, Noakes held the record for a while for the longest free-fall parachute jump by a British civilian. His 1977 unassisted ascent of the 51-metre-high (167 ft) Nelson's Column in Trafalgar Square in London has been voted the greatest moment in children's TV programming.

Alongside his Blue Peter work, Noakes also presented the BBC's Christmas edition of Disney Time with his Blue Peter colleagues on 27 December 1971. He returned to host the show solo at Easter 1979. In August 1972, he hosted four editions of BBC Radio 1's Junior Choice. Overlapping with his period on Blue Peter, Noakes and Shep made six series of Go With Noakes in which they travelled around Britain getting involved in diverse activities like motor racing, rowing, aerobatics and painting. In each series Noakes used a particular mode of transport to get about such as a yacht, on foot, narrow boat, or classic car. A total of 31 episodes of Go With Noakes were broadcast between 28 March 1976 and 21 December 1980. Noakes and Shep left on the 26th June 1978 (just 3 months after Purves).

In October 1998, Noakes joined Valerie Singleton and Peter Purves in a special programme that celebrated 40 years of Blue Peter. In January 2000, he joined his co-presenters again for the disinterment of the time capsule that they had buried in 1971 where he and Purves were awarded a gold badge.

=== Shep ===
Noakes was encouraged to take special responsibility for one of the show's pets. His original dog was Patch, the son of Petra, the first Blue Peter dog. After Patch's sudden death in 1971 he was given another pet dog, a Border Collie puppy, named Shep by viewers. Noakes's attempts to control the excitable Shep led to his catchphrase "Get down, Shep!".

When Noakes left Blue Peter, they offered to let him keep Shep, as the dog had lived with him since his TV debut. Despite Shep living with Noakes, the dog was always legally owned by the BBC and in rules that also applied to himself whilst under contract to the BBC, he could not use Shep for advertising or commercial purposes. Noakes was paid a stipend to cover all Shep's costs from the Blue Peter budget (as was Peter Purves for 'Petra' and later Simon Groom for 'Goldie') and as part of the agreement to keep Shep after leaving the show, Noakes agreed that the no-advertising condition should remain.

However, shortly after leaving the show, Noakes was furious to discover that what he called his "dog money" ceased to be paid by the Corporation and he confronted Biddy Baxter in a phone call. Baxter was adamant that since Shep had left Blue Peter, the programme should no longer be responsible for any of Shep's costs, although she did sympathise with some of his argument and felt that the BBC should pay Noakes for Shep to appear in Go With Noakes or for 'personal appearances' the dog made. Regardless, she later wrote that Noakes was too angry to discuss the matter and the two rarely spoke again. Soon after this angry confrontation, Noakes relinquished Shep, who went to live with Edith Menzies. Noakes subsequently appeared in a series of television advertisements for Spillers "Choice Cuts" dog food, using a dog that was indistinguishable from Shep but named Skip.

=== Departure and acrimony ===
After 12 years with Blue Peter, Noakes left the programme on 26 June 1978. By this time, his working relationship with the show's producer, Biddy Baxter, was very difficult. The bitterness would last for decades; in a 1999 interview, he said she "was an awful woman, I don't want to talk about her".

Noakes refused to appear on a special edition of Blue Peter to celebrate its twentieth birthday in October 1978 because of his poor relationship with Baxter. Eventually he was persuaded to pre-film a message for the programme, otherwise he would have been the only well-known presenter not to appear. The message was shot whilst he was on location filming the Go With Noakes episode "Around The Cheshire Ring", which allowed the show to explain his absence in a positive manner for the viewers. Five years later he did not appear at all for the silver anniversary programme in 1983.

On reflection, Noakes said that he was disappointed with the persona he had created on Blue Peter. Despite coming across as a natural presenter, he said his television personality was merely a role he played; one he once called "Idiot Noakes". He said of him: "Idiot Noakes has an extrovert personality, is light-hearted and jokey. A bit of a buffoon who would do anything for a laugh or a few pence."

Noakes also complained about what he regarded as his low salary during his time on Blue Peter, and how he had been uninsured for many of the stunts he had undertaken. Biddy Baxter, for her part, denied Noakes's claims there was a lack of insurance for his stunts.

== Later work ==
In 1979, Noakes wrote a children's book, The Flight of the Magic Clog, published by Fontana with illustrations by Toni Goffe. In the book, Mr. Brooks takes John, Mickey the clever one, June the talkative one, Barbara the pretty one and Eric the clumsy one on an adventure against the international villain Baron Wilhelm doppelgänger and his secret arms factory, using a giant, magic flying clog.

In 1982, Noakes and his wife made an unsuccessful attempt to sail around the world; they abandoned the attempt when their boat was damaged in a hurricane. In a second attempt in 1984, the couple stopped in Mallorca, Spain, where they initially planned a three-day stop, but instead settled at Andratx and ran a boat rental business. In 1983 Noakes presented The Dinosaur Trail, a seven-part documentary for Children's ITV.

Between 1986 and 1988, the BBC children's programme Fax answered questions posed by viewers. On 20 January 1987, the question "Whatever happened to John Noakes and Shep?" was posed. Noakes appeared on the show with his wife and revealed what he had been doing since retiring from television. During the course of the interview, Noakes tearfully revealed that Shep had died three days before.

Noakes also appeared in and voiced several television commercials throughout the 1980s, for products ranging from Andrex toilet tissue, Paper Mate pens, Everest Double Glazing and a public information film encouraging owners to keep their dogs on leads when in the countryside.

In the 2000s, Noakes trained in the Michel Thomas method of language tuition, and then became a language tutor, specialising in Romance languages. In 1999, Noakes co-hosted an ITV series entitled Mad About Pets and in 2004, he took part in the Living TV reality TV show I'm Famous and Frightened!. A year later, he appeared in the Channel 5 programme Britain's Worst Celebrity Driver. On 14 June 2008, he appeared in a Blue Peter-themed edition of The Weakest Link, being voted off second. On 7 September 2013, he appeared with Peter Purves in Pointless Celebrities.

== Personal life ==
He married his wife, Vicky (born 1944, née Fenez), a solicitor's daughter and a businesswoman specialising in ladies' fashion, in 1963 and they had one son, Mark (born 1963) who became a landscape architect. The couple settled in Mallorca in 1984.

On 30 June 2015 Noakes was reported missing from his home in Andratx, Mallorca: he had been diagnosed with Alzheimer's disease some years before. He was found the same day, close to his home, having fallen into grass in a storm drain.

Noakes died on 28 May 2017 at the Son Espases Hospital in Palma. In accordance with his wishes, on 28 October 2017, half of Noakes's ashes were scattered by firework over the playing fields of his old school at Rishworth, while the other half were scattered in Mallorca.
