= Take Me Home Tour =

Take Me Home Tour may refer to:

- Take Me Home Tour (Cher)
- Take Me Home Tour (One Direction)
