= Peter Duncan (actor) =

English actor and presenter (born 1954)

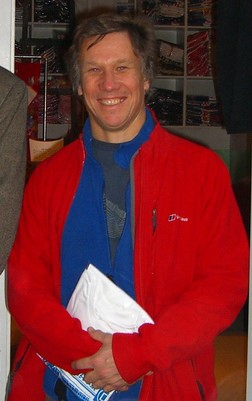
- Born: 3 May 1954 (age 72); London, England
- Education: Italia Conti Academy of Theatre Arts
- Years active: 1970–present
- Spouse: Annie Francis
- Website: www.pantoonline.co.uk

Peter Duncan (born 3 May 1954) is an English actor and television presenter. He was a presenter of Blue Peter in the 1980s, and made a series of family travel documentaries between 1999 and 2005. He directed, produced and performed in Jack and the Beanstalk which received a national cinema release in the UK in 2020. In 2009, Duncan co-founded The Natural Adventure, an adventure company specialising in self-guided walking and cycling holidays.

== Early life and education ==
Duncan was born in London.

He was a student at the Italia Conti Academy of Theatre Arts, an independent stage school in London. Duncan completed his secondary education at Hawes Down School for Boys at West Wickham, Bromley, London. He also studied with the Open University.

== Early career ==
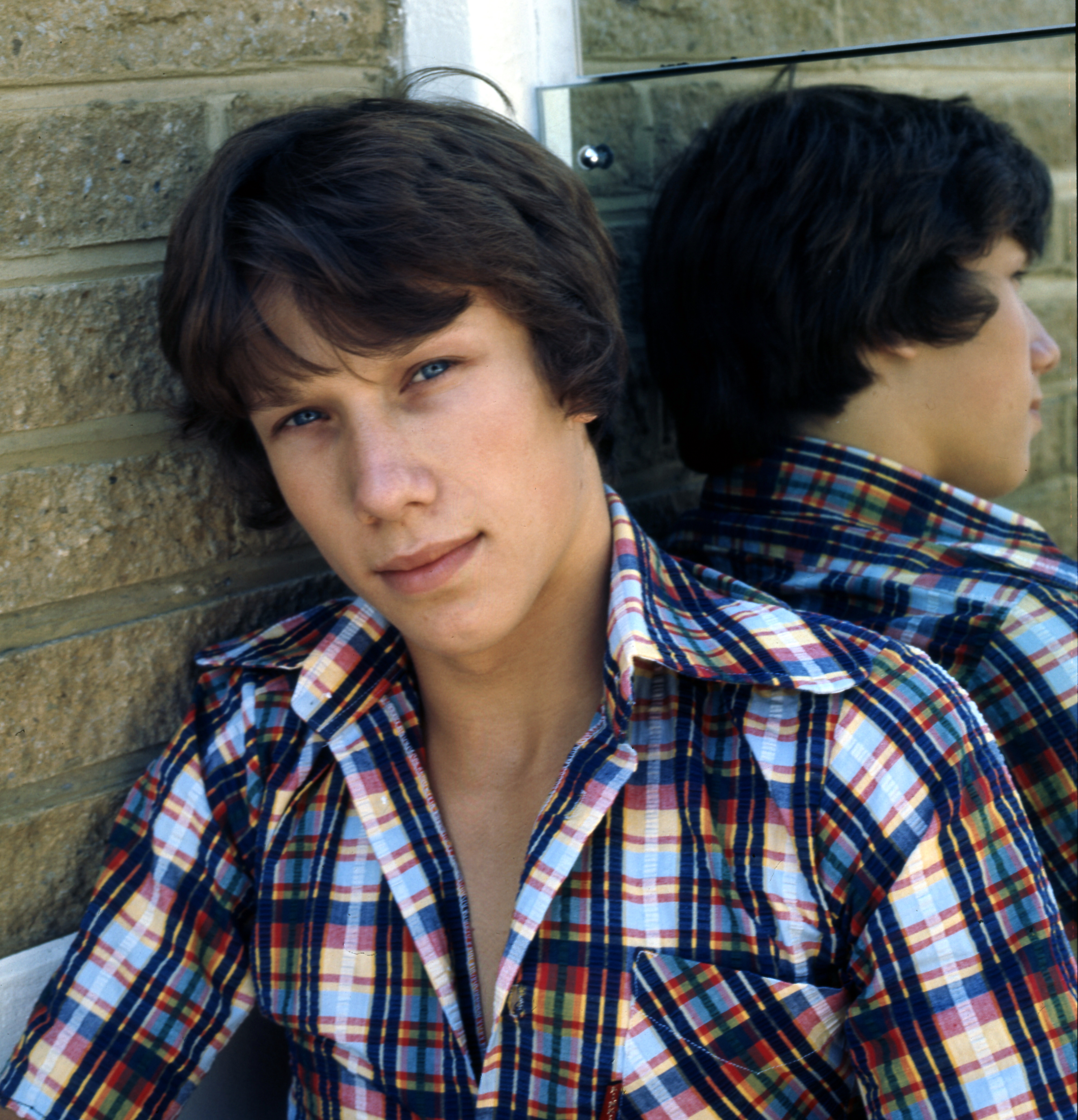
Duncan in 1973

Duncan's early career was as a stage actor, appearing as Jim Hawkins in Treasure Island followed by two years at Sir Laurence Olivier's National Theatre. His notable television roles include work on The Tomorrow People, Space: 1999, King Cinder, Play for Today, Warship, Oranges & Lemons, and season 2 of Survivors. In films, he appeared as Francois in the sex comedy On the Game (1974), the guitarist Kevin in Stardust (1974), Kit Nubbles in Mister Quilp (1975), the luckless Richard in The Lifetaker (1976), and in a brief role in the film Flash Gordon (1980), with his character dying after a few minutes on screen. Duncan starred in an episode of the children's television programme Storybook International as a young master in the tale of 'Cap O Rushes'.

Duncan played leading roles in the BBC's King Cinder as Kerry, and as Jimmy Carter in the 1977–1978 ITV children's television series The Flockton Flyer.

== Blue Peter ==
He joined Blue Peter in 1980, and shortly afterwards it was revealed in a tabloid newspaper that Duncan had appeared nude in the Michael Papas psychological thriller film The Lifetaker. The BBC denied that he was ever a porn star.

He ran in the first London Marathon in 1981 (in 3 hours and 10 minutes) and ran again in the 1991, 2001 and 2012 events. He was scheduled on 3 October 2021 to run for the final time.

Unusually, Duncan had two periods with Blue Peter, being on the team from 1980 to 1984, and again from 1985 to 1986. During his stay with the programme, he became associated with the kind of daredevil stunts previously popularised by John Noakes, and these continued in his own spin-off series, Duncan Dares. One of his most remembered such stunts occurred in 1980 when the Blue Peter crew put him out on a rope swing to clean the face of Clock Tower (Big Ben) without a safety harness, thus creating much trouble for the BBC. It is documented in Richard Marson's book Blue Peter 50th Anniversary.

On 20 February 2007, Duncan was awarded the highest Blue Peter Award - The Gold Badge. This badge was awarded in his role as the Scout Association's Chief Scout.

== Return to the stage ==
After leaving Blue Peter permanently in 1986, Duncan returned to the stage, including in Mike Stott's Funny Peculiar and in the musicals Barnum, Me and My Girl and The Card for which he was nominated for an Olivier Award for Best Actor in a Musical. In the 1990s he appeared in numerous pantomimes, some of which he also produced through his company Here's One I Made Earlier, including Robin Hood at the Lewisham (now Broadway) Theatre in South East London. He wrote and directed the Oxford Playhouse pantomime from 2006 to 2013.

He played Charlie Peace at Nottingham Playhouse in 2013 and Jack Firebrace in Birdsong in 2014 and 2015. He played Wilbur Turnblad in the touring production of Hairspray in 2015/16.

== Family travel documentaries ==
Between 1999 and 2005, Duncan filmed and produced three travelogue documentary series. Each series consisted of six episodes and featured his family embarking on backpacking trips around the world. The family also consists of Duncan's wife Annie, and their four children: Lucy, Katie, Georgia and Arthur.

The first series, Travel Bug, charted a six-month tour of the world. Filmed in 1999 when the children were aged 7 to 13, the series was shown on children's television on BBC1. The next series, Chinese Breakaway, charted the family's two-month backpacking trip across China in 2002. The series was aired on Five and Sky Travel. In the third series, Arthur's trip to India (also aired on Five), Duncan's 13-year-old son was featured as the chief presenter. A one-off additional episode (Arthur's trip to Jordan) followed his son to the heart of the Middle East.

== Scout Association ==
Duncan was appointed as the Scout Association's Chief Scout, for a five-year tenure from 5 September 2004 to July 2009.

== 2007 onwards ==
In 2007, Duncan took part in the Channel 4 series The Games. He has written and directed pantomimes for Oxford Playhouse and the Cheltenham Everyman. Until 2019, he produced the pantomime for the Lighthouse theatre in Dorset. In 2007, he played Macduff in Macbeth at Regents Park Theatre, London, and filmed a documentary about the Scouts climbing Everest. His one-man show Daft and Dangerous appeared in the 2009 Edinburgh fringe. Duncan featured in Through the Keyhole for the third time on 26 January 2019.

As a keen outdoor adventurer, Duncan co-founded "The Natural Adventure" in 2009, an adventure company specialising in self-guided walking and cycling holidays, with more than 600 tours in 58 countries.

In 2014, Duncan competed in BBC1's acrobatic and circus show Tumble, losing in the semi-final.

He is a Patron of British Youth Music Theatre.

In 2020, he wrote, produced and directed Jack and the Beanstalk, a British film which had a national cinema release.

== Partial filmography ==
- On the Game (1974) – François
- Stardust (1974) – Kevin
- Mister Quilp (1975) – Kit Nubbles
- The Lifetaker (1976) – Richard
- Flash Gordon (1980) – Young Treeman
- Jack and the Beanstalk (film) (2020) – Dame Trott
- Cinderella (film) (2021) – Billie Eyelash

The Scout Association
Preceded by George Purdy	Chief Scout of the United Kingdom and Overseas Territories; 2004 – 2009	Succeeded by Bear Grylls
