= Take Me Home (2023 film) =

2023 American dramatic short film

- Directed by: Liz Sargent
- Written by: Liz Sargent
- Produced by: Minos Papas; Liz Sargent
- Starring: Anna Sargent; Jeena Yi
- Cinematography: Minos Papas
- Edited by: Ashley Roby
- Music by: Filius Blue
- Production companies: Cyprian Films; Coalition of Asian Pacifics in Entertainment; Janet Yang Productions
- Release date: January 23, 2023 (Sundance Film Festival)
- Running time: 15 minutes
- Country: United States
- Language: English

Take Me Home is a 2023 American dramatic short film directed by Liz Sargent, starring her sister, Anna Sargent, and Jeena Yi. The film debuted at the Sundance Film Festival.

== Plot ==
The film opens in a quiet Florida home where Anna, a cognitively disabled woman, is doing chores that appear to have been neglected. As Anna tries to feed herself, the world becomes overwhelming, and she calls her sister Emily, who works in New York City. Anna attempts to explain that their mother is unresponsive, but does not explain the situation in a way that Emily can understand. Emily initially responds tersely, but changes her tone when she sees her mother has died over a video call.

Emily soon arrives in Florida, stepping out of a cab in front of their family home. Anna greets Emily, who has been watched over by Ms. Holtz, a case worker. During a conversation between Emily and the case worker, Anna begins to think of her mother caring for her. Emily is met with a deluge of responsibilities, including medical forms, financial decisions, and attempting to learn Anna's medication needs. A conversation takes place over the phone between Emily and the Medicare Nurse, but because Emily is not Anna's primary caretaker, she is unable to obtain the information needed. Anna is unable to articulate to Emily that she has the list of medications in a pouch she is wearing. Emily grows increasingly frustrated at the situation.

As Emily begins to pack up household items, removing things that hold sentimental value for Anna, Anna becomes upset. Emily, believing she's acting in Anna's best interest, makes decisions unilaterally, but Anna begins to resist, putting their mother's things back in the house. Anna lashes out at Emily, and Emily retreats back into their home. Anna apologizes to Emily, and the sisters bond over their mother's old clothing. The film intercuts flashbacks to Anna being tenderly cared for by her mother. During this, Anna is able to show Emily the medication list and medical paperwork that was in her pouch.

Time passes, turning the day to night, and the sisters are seen having a conversation during a Fourth of July celebration. While others are waving sparklers and the sounds of fireworks are heard, Anna expresses her fears and wants for independence to Emily, while Emily reassures her. They embrace and continue to watch the fireworks.

== Cast ==
- Anna Sargent as Anna
- Jeena Yi as Emily
- Joan Sargent as Mom
- Lisa Panagopoulos as Ms. Holtz
- Danielle J. Bowman as Medicaid Nurse
- Souljah Bless as Cab Driver

== Production ==
Take Me Home's production kickstarted after receiving the Julia S. Gouw Short Film Challenge $25,000 short film production grant from CAPE and Janet Yang Productions. It was filmed in Orlando, Florida, in the same home that Anna lives in with her family. The filming of the movie was structured to meet Anna's needs, shooting scenes "like a structured improv." The film uses a nontraditional pacing, which Sargent likened to a style of thinking similar to Anna's. Anna was born with a cyst on her brain, causing cognitive and physical disabilities, including impacting her memory. Liz and Anna's sister, Molly, helped coach Anna with her acting performance. Real conversations between Liz and Anna influenced portions of the dialogue in the film.

The film was shot on the Kinefinity MAVO Edge 8K, using a set of IronGlass lenses.

=== Feature-length adaptation ===
In 2024, it was announced that the short would be adapted into a feature-length film. Sargent partnered with Caring Across Generations, a national advocacy organization that focuses on assisting those who require long-term care and home care workers, to help finance the project. In 2025, Sargent became a recipient of the Tribeca Festival AT&T Untold Stories grant, awarding $1 million towards the funding of the feature-length version of Take Me Home. As part of the grant, the feature will premiere at the 2026 Tribeca Festival.

In October 2025, The Hollywood Reporter noted that the feature-length wrapped filming the prior month, taking place in Florida. The cast of the feature-length included Anna Sargent, Victor Slezak, Ali Ahn, Marceline Hugot, and Shane Harper. The feature-length premiered in the U.S. Dramatic section at the 2026 Sundance Film Festival, where it won the Waldo Salt Screenwriting Award.

== Accolades ==
Take Me Home is a winner of the first Julia S. Gouw Short Film Challenge for Asian American and Pacific Islander Women and Non-Binary Filmmakers.

In 2024, Take Me Home was represented at the White House by Liz, Molly, and Anna Sargent, who appeared for an event for disability advocates hosted by the Office of Public Engagement. The event marked the 25th anniversary of the U.S. Supreme Court's decision in Olmstead v. L.C., which affirmed the right of people with disabilities to receive state-funded support and services. In that same year, the film won the Grand Jury Award at American Cinematheque’s Proof Film Festival.
