= Fax (TV series) =

- Genre: Educational
- Country of origin: United Kingdom
- Original language: English
- No. of series: 3
- No. of episodes: 48

Production
- Production location: New Broadcasting House
- Running time: 25 minutes
- Production company: BBC Manchester

Original release
- Network: BBC1
- Release: 7 January 1986 – 24 April 1988

Fax is a British educational show, which included viewers sending in question, which aired on BBC1 from 7 January 1986 to 24 April 1988. The series was presented by Bill Oddie, Wendy Leavesley, Debbie Rix and Billy Butler.

== Transmissions ==
Series	Start date	End date	Episodes
1	7 January 1986	7 March 1986	16
2	6 January 1987	27 February 1987	16
3	3 January 1988	24 April 1988	16

The show was created to fill a vacant time slot after the BBC replaced Sixty Minutes with the Six O'Clock News, creating a gap between the end of children's shows and the beginning of the news. The third series of Fax was moved to a Sunday teatime slot, when Michael Grade moved the Australian soap Neighbours to the early evening on weekdays.
