= Take Me Home (2026 film) =

2026 American dramatic film

- Theatrical release poster
- Directed by: Liz Sargent
- Written by: Liz Sargent
- Produced by: Apoorva Guru Charan; Minos Papas; Liz Sargent
- Starring: Anna Sargent; Victor Slezak; Ali Ahn; Marceline Hugot; Shane Harper
- Cinematography: Farhad Ahmed Dehlvi
- Edited by: Ian Holden
- Music by: Nathan Halpern; Chris Ruggiero
- Production companies: All Caps; Caring Across; Cinereach; Cyprian Films, New York; River Road Entertainment
- Distributed by: Willa
- Release dates: January 26, 2026 (Sundance); September 23, 2026 (United States)
- Running time: 91 minutes
- Country: United States
- Language: English

Take Me Home is a 2026 American drama film written, produced, and directed by Liz Sargent. It is a feature film adaptation of the 2023 short film of the same name. It stars Anna Sargent, Victor Slezak, Ali Ahn, Marceline Hugot, and Shane Harper.

The film had its world premiere at the 2026 Sundance Film Festival on January 26, and its international premiere at the Perspectives section of the 76th Berlin International Film Festival on February 17, and was released on September 23, 2026, by Willa.

== Premise ==
Anna cares for her aging parents in a fragile balance of meeting one another's needs. When a Florida heat wave shatters their family and Anna's routine, her future is uncertain until she creates a world where she can thrive.

== Cast ==
- Anna Sargent as Anna
- Victor Slezak as Bob
- Ali Ahn as Emily
- Marceline Hugot as Joan
- Shane Harper as James

== Production ==
In 2024, it was announced that the short film (of the same name) would be adapted into a feature-length film. Sargent partnered with Caring Across Generations, a national advocacy organization that focuses on assisting those who require long-term care and home care workers, to help finance the project. In 2025, Sargent became a recipient of the Tribeca Festival AT&T Untold Stories grant, awarding $1 million towards the funding of the feature-length version of Take Me Home. In October 2025, The Hollywood Reporter noted that the feature-length wrapped filming the prior month, taking place in Florida. The cast of the feature-length included Anna Sargent as Anna, Victor Slezak as Bob, Ali Ahn as Emily, Marceline Hugot as Joan, and Shane Harper as James.

== Release ==
Take Me Home premiered at the Sundance Film Festival on January 26, 2026, where it won the Waldo Salt Screenwriting Award. It had its international premiere at the Perspectives section of the 76th Berlin International Film Festival on February 17 at the 76th Berlin International Film Festival. In May 2026, Willa acquired distribution rights to the film. It was released on September 23, 2026.

== Reception ==
On review aggregator website Rotten Tomatoes, the film holds an approval rating of 95% based on 21 reviews, with an average rating of 6.3/10.
