= Blue Peter Special Assignment =

- Genre: Children's Documentary
- Created by: Edward Barnes
- Written by: Edward Barnes; Dorothy Smith
- Directed by: Edward Barnes; Daniel Wolf; David Brown; Harry Cowdy; Peter Ridsdale Scott; Dorothea Brooking; Sarah Hellings; Hugh David; David Turnbull; Alex Leger; David Hargreaves
- Presented by: Valerie Singleton; Peter Purves; Lesley Judd
- Country of origin: United Kingdom
- Original language: English
- No. of series: 7
- No. of episodes: 39

Production
- Executive producer: Biddy Baxter
- Producer: Edward Barnes
- Production location: Various
- Running time: 25 minutes

Original release
- Network: BBC1
- Release: 7 January 1973 – 7 June 1981

Related
- Blue Peter

Blue Peter Special Assignment is a factual BBC TV series broadcast in the 1970s and early 1980s, the first spin-off from the long running BBC series Blue Peter. It ran regularly from 1973 until 1981, usually at weekends on BBC1, and was heavily promoted on Blue Peter itself.

The concept for the series was developed after Valerie Singleton had presented a successful documentary 'special' with HRH Princess Anne when she had visited Kenya in 1971. The Special Assignment series was mainly produced by Edward Barnes and presented initially by Valerie Singleton and later by Peter Purves and Lesley Judd all of whom had been presenters on Blue Peter itself.

== Series guide ==
Series One featured Valerie Singleton looking at six European Capital Cities. These included Rome, Paris, London, Edinburgh, Amsterdam and Brussels. The first programme to be filmed was the one featuring Rome and included a personal address to the children of Britain from Pope Paul VI in The Vatican.

Series Two continued to feature Singleton looking at European Cities and included Dublin, York and Madrid. Later series looked at Islands and included The Isle of Wight, The Isle of Man, Hong Kong, Malta and Venice, even though Venice had also featured in an earlier series as a 'city'. Later the show began to look at famous houses or famous individuals and included biographies of Vivaldi, The Brontë Sisters, The Duke of Wellington, Saint Therese of Lisieux, Marie Antoinette and Rudyard Kipling and both Lesley Judd and Peter Purves began presenting the series in place of Singleton.

The series in 1977 was presented jointly by Peter Purves and Lesley Judd, with the theme of 'twin towns'.

The final series was co-presented alternately by Singleton and Peter Purves, being broadcast in 1981. The series theme was 'Rivers', with Singleton examining the Yukon and Niagara, while Purves reported on the Tamar, the Tweed and the Singapore Rivers.

Spin off books were published by Edward Barnes.

== Episodes ==
=== Blue Peter Royal Safari (1971) ===
No.	Title	Directed by	Written by	Original release date
1	"Blue Peter Royal Safari"	Edward Barnes	Biddy Baxter	11 April 1971
The first solo television film for HRH Princess Anne with Valerie Singleton. Produced by Biddy Baxter & Edward Barnes.

Repeated Monday, 7 June 1971 at 7:20 pm and Monday, 3 April 1972 at 5:00 pm on BBC1.

=== Series 1: European Capitals (1973) ===
Valerie Singleton reports on six capital cities of Europe. Produced by Edward Barnes.

No. overall	No. in series	Title	Directed by	Written by	Original release date
1	1	"Rome"	Edward Barnes	Edward Barnes	7 January 1973
Valerie meets Pope Paul VI.
2	2	"Amsterdam"	David Brown	Edward Barnes	14 January 1973
Valerie tells the story of Anne Frank.
3	3	"The City of London"	Peter Ridsdale Scott	Edward Barnes	21 January 1973
Valerie meets the Lord Mayor of London.
4	4	"Paris"	David Brown	Edward Barnes	28 January 1973
Valerie celebrates Bastille Day.
5	5	"Edinburgh"	David Brown	Edward Barnes	4 February 1973
Valerie tells the story of Greyfriars Bobby.
6	6	"Vienna"	David Turnbull	Edward Barnes	11 February 1973
Valerie meets the Vienna Boys' Choir.

The series was repeated on BBC1 in November/December 1973 with the broadcast order changed to: Rome, Amsterdam, Edinburgh, Paris, City of London, Vienna.

=== Series 2: European Cities (1974) ===
Valerie Singleton reports on five European cities. Produced by Edward Barnes.

No. overall	No. in series	Title	Directed by	Written by	Original release date
7	1	"Venice"	Edward Barnes	Edward Barnes	31 March 1974
Valerie tells the story of Venice.
8	2	"Brussels"	David Brown	Edward Barnes	7 April 1974
Valerie finds out why Napoleon lost the Battle of Waterloo.
9	3	"Dublin"	Harry Cowdy	Edward Barnes	14 April 1974
Valerie tells the story of the Easter Rising.
10	4	"Madrid"	Peter Smith	Edward Barnes	21 April 1974
Valerie discovers what flamenco is about.
11	5	"York"	David Brown	Edward Barnes	28 April 1974
Valerie looks at Easter Eggs and Stained Glass.

=== Series 3: Islands (1975) ===
Valerie Singleton reports on six islands. Produced by Edward Barnes.

No. overall	No. in series	Title	Directed by	Written by	Original release date
12	1	"Hong Kong"	Edward Barnes	Edward Barnes	9 March 1975
Valerie visits the water people.
13	2	"The Isle of Skye"	Daniel Wolf	Edward Barnes	16 March 1975
Valerie follows the trail of Flora MacDonald & Bonnie Prince Charlie.
14	3	"Malta GC"	Harry Cowdy	Edward Barnes	23 March 1975
Valerie celebrates the village festival of St Nicholas of Siġġiewi.
15	4	"The Isle of Wight"	Sarah Hellings	Edward Barnes	30 March 1975
Valerie tells the story of Osborne House.
16	5	"The Isle of Man"	David Brown	Edward Barnes	6 April 1975
Valerie tries her hand at the TT races.
17	6	"Venice"	Edward Barnes	Edward Barnes	13 April 1975
In a revised repeat, Valerie tells the story of Venice.

A repeat season was broadcast in October 1975 on BBC1, featuring the following episodes:

- Hong Kong (3 October 1975)
- Brussels (10 October 1975)
- York (17 October 1975)
- Madrid (24 October 1975)
- Amsterdam (31 October 1975)

=== Series 4: Great Houses (1976) ===
Great names of history whose houses still exist. Produced by Edward Barnes.

No. overall	No. in series	Title	Directed by	Written by	Original release date
18	1	"The Prince Regent at Brighton"	Sarah Hellings	Dorothy Smith	23 May 1976
Valerie Singleton provides a link with the past.
19	2	"Disraeli at Hughenden"	Daniel Wolf	Dorothy Smith	30 May 1976
Valerie Singleton visits an English great house with Alan Badel as the voice of Disraeli.
20	3	"Pavlova at Ivy House"	Edward Barnes	Dorothy Smith	6 June 1976
Lesley Judd visits the home of the legendary ballerina.
21	4	"Darwin at Down House"	Daniel Wolf	Dorothy Smith	13 June 1976
Valerie Singleton with Michael Hordern as the voice of Charles Darwin.
22	5	"Keats at Wentworth Place"	Harry Cowdy	Dorothy Smith	20 June 1976
Valerie Singleton with Ronald Pickup as the voice of John Keats.
23	6	"Raleigh at Sherborne Castle"	Sarah Hellings	Dorothy Smith	27 June 1976
Valerie Singleton with Richard Pasco as the voice of Sir Walter Raleigh and the voices of John Nettleton and Jonathan Scott.

=== Series 5: Twin Towns (1977) ===
Peter Purves and Lesley Judd visit five different sets of twin towns. Produced by Edward Barnes.

No. overall	No. in series	Title	Directed by	Written by	Original release date
24	1	"Richmond & Fontainebleau"	Daniel Wolf	Edward Barnes	19 June 1977
Lesley Judd in Fontainebleau and Peter Purves in Richmond, Surrey.
25	2	"Coventry & Warsaw"	Sarah Hellings	Edward Barnes	26 June 1977
Lesley Judd in Coventry and Peter Purves in Warsaw.
26	3	"Cambridge & Heidelberg"	Edward Barnes	Edward Barnes	3 July 1977
Lesley Judd in Cambridge and Peter Purves in Heidelberg.
27	4	"Bristol & Bordeaux"	Sarah Hellings	Edward Barnes	10 July 1977
Lesley Judd in Bordeaux and Peter Purves in Bristol.
28	5	"Portsmouth & Haifa"	Daniel Wolf	Edward Barnes	17 July 1977
Lesley Judd in Haifa and Peter Purves in Portsmouth.

=== Series 6: Biographies (1979) ===
Peter Purves investigates dramatic settings for the lives of six great personalities from Italy, France and England. Produced by Edward Barnes.

No. overall	No. in series	Title	Directed by	Written by	Original release date
29	1	"Marie Antoinette at Versailles"	Hugh David	Dorothy Smith	7 January 1979
Peter Purves with the voices of Mary Wimbush, Geoffrey Matthews and John Gabriel.
30	2	"Rudyard Kipling at Bateman's"	Sarah Hellings	Dorothy Smith	14 January 1979
Peter Purves with the voices of Nicolette McKenzie and John Nettleton.
31	3	"Saint Therese of Lisieux"	Sarah Hellings	Dorothy Smith	21 January 1979
Peter Purves looks at the life of ‘The Little Flower’.
32	4	"The Duke of Wellington at Stratford Saye"	Hugh David	Dorothy Smith	28 January 1979
Peter Purves looks at the Duke of Wellington’s home life.
33	5	"The Brontes at Haworth"	Dorothea Brooking	Dorothy Smith	4 February 1979
Peter Purves follows the footsteps of the Bronte family.
34	6	"Antonio Vivaldi in Venice"	Sarah Hellings	Dorothy Smith	11 February 1979
Peter Purves meets the girls of the Venice Conservatorio Orchestra with the voices Sean Barrett, John Nettleton, John Rowe and Geoffrey Matthews as Vivaldi.

=== Series 7: Rivers (1981) ===
A series of five programmes produced by Edward Barnes.

No. overall	No. in series	Title	Directed by	Written by	Original release date
35	1	"The Niagara River"	David Turnbull	Dorothy Smith	10 May 1981
Valerie Singleton discovers the comic and the tragic stories of one of the world's greatest natural wonders - the Niagara Falls.
36	2	"The River Tweed"	Sarah Hellings	Dorothy Smith	17 May 1981
Peter Purves travels the length of the Tweed on the border of Scotland and England.
37	3	"The Yukon River"	David Hargreaves	Dorothy Smith	24 May 1981
Valerie Singleton travels 500 miles down the Yukon.
38	4	"The Singapore River"	Sarah Hellings	Dorothy Smith	31 May 1981
Peter Purves explores the Singapore River.
39	5	"The River Tamar"	Alex Leger	Dorothy Smith	7 June 1981
Peter Purves visits a river that has a special place in the lives of people in Devon and Cornwall. Executive Producer: David Hargreaves.
