= Lesley Judd =

British dancer, TV presenter (born 1946)

- Born: 20 December 1946 (age 79); London, England
- Education: Tring Park School for the Performing Arts
- Years active: 1962–1988
- Spouses: Derek Fowlds (m. 1974; div. 1978) Terry Gabell (m. 1978, divorced) Anthony Relph (m. 1986, died) Peter Thornton (died 2002)
- Children: 2

Lesley Judd (born 20 December 1946) is a British former television presenter and dancer, best known as a long-serving host of the BBC children's programme Blue Peter (1972–1979).

== Early life, education and early career ==
Born in London, the daughter of Leslie T. Judd and Hilda Madeline Haddock, Judd was educated at the independent Tring Park School for the Performing Arts (Hertfordshire). In 1959, she appeared in the BBC Television adaptation of Heidi, playing the part of Clara. Another early appearance as a child actress was as a schoolgirl in the Z-Cars episode "Person Unknown" on 14 November 1962. An early dancing appearance came on BBC TV's The Language of Love in 1964.

In 1967, Judd was one of the "children" dancers on Gillian Lynne's BBC2 show Hey Riddle Diddle starring Roy Castle and Nelson Riddle. She was a hostess on the Associated-Rediffusion game show Exit! It's the Way-Out Show hosted by Ed Stewart. Beginning in 1967 with The Rolf Harris Show, Judd appeared as part of the dance troupe The Young Generation on several television shows, but walked out in breach of her contract. When offered the role as a BBC presenter soon after, the BBC contracts department was furious that she was being hired by the corporation once again and insisted the contract was "watertight".

Judd was one of the background dancers in the filmed musical Half a Sixpence (1967) and had a small speaking role in the first Monty Python film And Now for Something Completely Different (1971, the "Hell's Grannies" sketch), and the Christopher Lee horror film I, Monster (1971). Judd made a brief return to dancing in 1976 when she joined Pan's People on Top of the Pops for a one-off routine (the rehearsals were later shown on Blue Peter), and later she often danced on the BBC show All Star Record Breakers.

== Blue Peter ==
Brought in to the show when Valerie Singleton began to diversify her television career in 1972, Judd initially presented with Singleton, John Noakes and Peter Purves, the partnership with Noakes and Purves lasting until 1978. After Noakes and Purves left three months apart she was briefly joined by Simon Groom and Christopher Wenner and her successor Tina Heath. Judd left the show finally in April 1979. Her tenure on Blue Peter was often in doubt; she was retained for most of her seven years on the show on short term 3-month contracts. When her first marriage, to Derek Fowlds, broke down in 1975 and her ex-husband threatened to 'tell all' to the tabloid press, Sally James was lined up to replace her on Blue Peter, but the storm blew over and Judd remained with the programme.

In 1975, Judd visited the Bishop Rock lighthouse, but (according to her BBC profile page) "looked like she was about to plunge into the murky depths". Disaster nearly struck as she travelled by rope to the lighthouse from a boat. Her harness slipped, leaving Judd with no support should she lose her grip on the rope. Show editors Biddy Baxter and Richard Marson both defended Judd's reaction to this incident in subsequent books, revealing that she could not swim and thus showed enormous bravery by undertaking the challenge at all. During her time on Blue Peter Judd also presented the spin-off series Blue Peter Special Assignment.

== Personal life ==
In 1974 Judd married Derek Fowlds but in 1975 the marriage broke down and they divorced in 1978. She then married Terry Gabell, a Blue Peter cameraman (who filmed a Nelson's Column climb in 1977) in 1978. Judd left Blue Peter in 1979 after Gabell's multiple sclerosis worsened. She divorced him and later married former drummer Anthony Relph in 1986. They had two children. Relph died of lung embolism at 48.

She later moved to France and married retired radio station manager Peter Thornton who died in 2002 from heart disease.

== Subsequent career ==
After leaving Blue Peter, Judd fronted a children's TV chat show, In The Limelight With Lesley, on BBC1, along the same lines as the earlier series Val Meets The VIPs with Singleton. One of her guests was British Prime Minister Margaret Thatcher who was asked to comment on an earlier appearance on Val Meets The VIPs in 1973 in which she had said there would not be "a woman Prime Minister in my lifetime". Another guest was the reigning Miss World Gina Swainson. She also guest starred on an episode of Go With Noakes in 1980. Judd appeared with Billy Boyle on an ITV series for children, Dance Crazy, tracing the history of dance and was a regular panellist on game shows such as Punchlines. She later featured as 'The Mole' in the educational game show The Adventure Game, and was co-presenter of the technology game show The Great Egg Race, the computer-related Micro Live from 1984 and Pets in Particular (1985).

Judd was a presenter on Woman's Hour on BBC Radio 4 from 1982 to 1988, and appeared as a television newsreader in the film Threads (1984). She was a presenter on the London radio station LBC during the late 1980s, later co-hosting with Steve Allen, at the same time presenting various programmes on television for the Open University. In the 1980s, she presented two educational series for young children, Let's Go Maths and Maths is Fun, produced by Granada Television for ITV Schools.

In 1992, Judd also fronted a daytime interview programme on UK Channel 4, Time To Talk. Each programme consisted of an interview with one celebrity guest. Valerie Singleton, David Kossoff, Diana Moran, Jonathon Porritt and Don Maclean were among the interviewees. In the late 1970s, Judd was a continuity announcer on Southern Television.

== Post-presenting career ==
Now living near Toulouse, France, Judd is employed as a conference organiser. She has taken part in several Blue Peter reunions, specifically Blue Peter's 35th birthday programme in 1993 and the 50th birthday commemorations in 2008. She also appeared in December 2017 in a tribute programme to fellow Blue Peter presenter John Noakes, who had died earlier that year. On 16 October 2018, she appeared on BBC Breakfast and later that day on Blue Peter to celebrate their sixtieth anniversary.
