= Rosemary Gill =

English children's television producer

Rosemary Ffolkes Gill (7 December 1930 – 22 February 2011) was an English children's television producer connected with Blue Peter, Multi-Coloured Swap Shop and Saturday Superstore.

== Early life and career ==
Gill was born in London to a schoolmaster and former nurse; the family lived in Camden Town. Her parents had met at Craiglockhart, near Edinburgh, where her mother was then working, the building being used as a military psychiatric hospital for World War I shell-shock patients like her father. Like her elder sister, Hazel, Gill was educated at St Paul's Girls' School.

In 1948, Gill began working for the BBC as a secretary (her sister had joined the corporation three years earlier), initially working for women's radio programmes, then at Alexandra Palace along with her sister. She worked for the producers Dorothea Brooking and Joy Harington, both involved in creating children's drama productions. Later, from 1955, she was an assistant floor manager.

== Blue Peter and Swap Shop ==
In this period, she first met Edward Barnes, who later managed to gain her secondment to Blue Peter when the producer (later programme editor) Biddy Baxter was called for jury service in 1963. Owen Reed, then head of the children's department was persuaded Gill could remain on the production team for a short period; she remained for another 13 years. The team of Baxter, Barnes and Gill established the programme's reputation; the later two became producers when the programme became bi-weekly in 1964. Gill became deputy editor when Barnes was appointed deputy head of the children's department.

In 1976, Gill left Blue Peter to become the editor of Multi-Coloured Swap Shop, more commonly known as Swap Shop. A newly created unrehearsed three-hour Saturday morning programme presented by Noel Edmonds, then best known as a disc-jockey for BBC Radio 1, the programme was a great success, despite initial doubts from some within the BBC. The series, based around children exchanging their possessions, replaced the previous BBC Saturday morning offering of repeats. "We wanted a programme that absolutely anybody could join in. As long as they had something, either goods and chattels, ideas or simply chat, to exchange", Gill remembered. "I don't believe she [Gill] had an ego," Edmonds recalled. "Rose was the silent shadow drifting behind the cameras, stepping over cables and whispering words of encouragement to a studio crew who all knew that in Swap Shop we were creating something very special".

When Swap Shop ended in 1982, Edmonds wishing to concentrate on his career in primetime television, Gill remembered that during her childhood, she had enjoyed playing shop with her sister. Saturday Superstore, now with Mike Read as the main presenter, based around an imaginary department store, was the new Saturday morning children's programme. It did not match the public reception of its predecessor, although it was welcomed by BBC management. Gill took early retirement in 1983.

== Private life ==
Gill was engaged in the late 1940s to a submariner serving in the Royal Navy, but her fiancé died in a submarine accident.

Gill's sister, Hazel, who had managed Blue Peter extensive correspondence, also retired early, and the two sisters travelled extensively in Europe and North America until Hazel died of cancer in 2001. Rosemary Gill died in February 2011, aged 80.

== See also ==
- List of BBC children's television programmes
