= Sarah Andrews =

Sarah Andrews may refer to:

- Sarah Andrews (author) (died 2019), American author and geologist
- Sarah Andrews (cricketer) (born 1981), Australian cricketer
- Sarah Andrews (immunologist), American immunologist
- Sarah Hollis Andrews (born 1962), English child actress
- Sarah Shepherd Andrews (1892–1961), American missionary in Japan
- Sarah Andrews (politician), South Australian politician, member for Gibson
