= Gary Downie =

British production manager

- Born: Roderick Gary Downie Pinkus; 17 July 1940; South Africa
- Died: 19 January 2006 (aged 65); Brighton, East Sussex, England
- Occupation: Production manager
- Partner: John Nathan-Turner (1972–2002; Nathan-Turner's death)

Roderick Gary Downie Pinkus (17 July 1940 – 19 January 2006) was a South African-born English production manager on many 1980s episodes of the long-running science fiction television series Doctor Who, and partner of its producer John Nathan-Turner. His own analysis of the role of a production manager can be found on the BBC DVD release of The Two Doctors.

== Career ==
Downie had previously been a dancer and alongside Adrian Le Peltier he occasionally accompanied Pan's People between 1968 and 1970, in Happening for Lulu, the Bobbie Gentry Show and Top of the Pops.

Downie also worked on I, Claudius, All Creatures Great and Small and Star Cops.

== Personal life ==
Downie died on 19 January 2006, having survived Nathan-Turner who died in 2002. Gary Downie shared a home with Nathan-Turner in Saltdean, Brighton. Downie was the author of the mid-1980s book The Doctor Who Cookbook. Many Doctor Who celebrities donated recipes to the volume including Ian Marter and Lalla Ward.

== Controversy ==
In Richard Marson's book The Life and Scandalous Times of John Nathan-Turner (2013) Marson alleges Downie sexually assaulted him, and details other accusations of inappropriate behaviour by Nathan-Turner and Downie, during the former's period as the series' producer.

== Bibliography ==
- 1985 – The Doctor Who Cookbook – ISBN 0-491-03214-5
