= Val Meets The VIPs =

British children's television series (1973–1974)

- Also known as: In the Limelight with Lesley
- Genre: Children's chat show
- Created by: Edward Barnes
- Directed by: Kate Harris; Alan Russell
- Presented by: Valerie Singleton; Lesley Judd
- Country of origin: United Kingdom
- Original language: English
- No. of episodes: 23

Production
- Executive producer: Edward Barnes
- Producer: Jill Roach
- Production locations: BBC Television Centre, London
- Running time: 25 minutes

Original release
- Network: BBC1
- Release: 21 February 1973 – 21 December 1974
- Release: 9 May – 6 June 1980

Val Meets The VIPs is a British children's chat series broadcast over three seasons from 1973 to 1974 on BBC1, hosted by Valerie Singleton.

There were eighteen editions, broadcast in three series of six episodes. The format for the programme was that Singleton would interview one celebrity guest, who would also face questioning from the audience of children assembled in the studio, after a short 'fly-on-the-wall' film had introduced each guest. Guests came from different areas of public life, including politics, exploring, sports, pop music and entertainment. The best remembered edition of the show (and the only one ever to be repeated on BBC television) featured Margaret Thatcher, then Secretary of State for Education and Science in the British Government. When asked by a child in the audience if she wanted to be Prime Minister, Thatcher responded that she did not have enough experience and (to an earlier question) that there would not be "a woman Prime Minister in my lifetime" (see external links). Two years later, she was elected leader of the British Conservative Party and became Prime Minister in May 1979. All three series were produced by Jill Roach. For the last series only, each edition was billed individually in the Radio Times as "Val Meets [Guest Name]" (i.e. Val Meets Susan Hampshire), but the show's titles were always "Val Meets... The VIPS".

A later series, In The Limelight With Lesley, ran on BBC1 in 1980, and followed the same format, but with Lesley Judd presenting. This latter series was produced by Sarah Hellings, who has since directed many television series. Margaret Thatcher was also a guest on this series and was shown the clip from her appearance on Val Meets... Margaret Thatcher and asked to comment on her earlier remarks.

== Guests ==
=== Series 1 ===
Val Meets The VIPs – Series 1 Guests:

- Morecambe & Wise (21 February 1973)
- Graham Hill (28 February 1973)
- Margaret Thatcher (7 March 1973)
- Petula Clark (14 March 1973)
- Gordon Banks (21 March 1973)
- Chris Bonington (28 March 1973)

=== Series 2 ===
Val Meets The VIPs – Series 2 Guests:

- Mary Peters (23 April 1974)
- Kevin Keegan (30 April 1974)
- Les Gray (7 May 1974)
- Thor Heyerdahl (14 May 1974)
- Michael Crawford (21 May 1974)
- Lord Vic Feather (28 May 1974)

=== Series 3 ===
Val Meets The VIPs – Series 3 Guests:

- Mike Yarwood (15 November 1974)
- Susan Hampshire (22 November 1974)
- Jack Charlton (29 November 1974)
- Lyn Paul (6 December 1974)
- Barry Sheene (13 December 1974)
- Chay Blyth (21 December 1974)

=== In The Limelight With Lesley ===
In The Limelight With Lesley – Series 1 Guests:

- David Attenborough (9 May 1980)
- Gina Swainson (16 May 1980)
- Brian Jacks (23 May 1980)
- Christopher Timothy (30 May 1980)
- Margaret Thatcher (6 June 1980)
