= Denis Carey (actor) =

British actor (1909–1986)

- Carey as Mr. Ryder in the series "The Adventures of Black Beauty".
- Born: William Denis Carey; 3 August 1909; London, England
- Died: 28 September 1986 (aged 77); London, England
- Occupation: Actor
- Spouse: Yvonne Coulette

Denis Carey (3 August 1909 – 28 September 1986) was a British actor who appeared in many film and television roles, although his biggest box office success was the revue Salad Days, which ran for 2,283 performances in the 1954–55 London season.

Some of Carey's notable appearances include Dennis Potter's 1968 television series A Beast With Two Backs, Elizabeth R, I, Claudius and The Barchester Chronicles. Carey appeared three times in the BBC science fiction series Doctor Who, including Professor Chronotis in the incomplete serial Shada, as the eponymous Keeper in The Keeper of Traken, and as the fake old man Borad in Timelash.

Carey was born in London, the son of May (née Wilkinson) and William Denis Carey. He was married to actress Yvonne Coulette. He died in London.

== Filmography ==
=== Film ===
Year	Title	Role	Notes
1948	The Red Shoes	Dancer	
1949	The Queen of Spades	Dancer	Uncredited
1949	Children of Chance	The fisherman	
1955	Oh... Rosalinda!	Dancer	
1973	Psychomania	Coroner's assistant	
1973	The Day of the Jackal	Casson	
1985	Lamb	Mr. Lamb	

=== Television ===
Year	Title	Episode(s)	Role	Network	Archive status
1947	The Tragical History of Doctor Faustus	TV Movie	Unknown	BBC Television Service	Missing
1948	Mungo's Mansion	TV Movie	Jack Manders	BBC Television Service	Missing
1948	Happy as Larry	TV Movie	Second tailor	BBC Television Service	Missing
1961	ITV Play of the Week	Series 7, Episode 8: Serjeant Musgrave's Dance	Pte. Attercliffe	ITV (ATV)	Exists
1962	BBC Sunday-Night Play	Series 4, Episode 5: The Big Eat	Harold Britten	BBC Television	Missing
1963	Armchair Theatre	Series 4, Episode 79: Late Summer	Mr. Dinsdale	ITV (ABC)	Exists
1965	Theatre 625	Series 2, Episode 8: The Minister	Yates	BBC Two	Missing
1965	Jury Room	Episode 2: A Time to Speak	Henry Henley	BBC Two	Missing
1965	ITV Play of the Week	Series 10, Episode 47: As the Crow Flies	Inspector Terry	ITV (ATV)	Exists
1965	Theatre 625	Series 3, Episode 7: The Siege of Manchester	Sir John Mounson	BBC Two	Exists
1965	Serjeant Musgrave's Dance	All 3 episodes	Private Attercliffe	BBC One	Exists
1966	Thirteen Against Fate	Episode 6: The Schoolmaster	Chief of Police	BBC One	Exists
1966	This Man Craig	Series 2, Episode 12: I	Mr. Marsh	BBC Two	Missing
1967	Armchair Theatre	Series 7, Episode 4: Never Mind the Quality, Feel the Width	Father Ryan	ITV (ABC)	Missing
1967	This Man Craig	Series 2, Episode 22: The Day's Run	Mr. Marsh	BBC Two	Missing
1967	Champion House	Series 1, Episodes 6 & 7: The Personal Approach / The Bradford Touch	Fred Fairlie	BBC One	Missing
1967	The Revenue Men	Series 2, Episode 10: The Exile	Raban	BBC Two	Missing
1968	Champion House	Series 2, Episodes 3 & 13: A Knife in Your Back / Go West, Young Man	Fred Fairlie	BBC One	Missing
1968	The First Lady	Series 1, Episode 4: Upset	Dr. Evans	BBC One	Missing
1968	The Expert	Series 1, Episode 1: The Unknown Factor	Barrington	BBC Two	Missing
1968	The Wednesday Play	Series 8, Episode 12: A Beast with Two Backs	Ebenezer	BBC One	Exists
1969	Fraud Squad	Series 1, Episode 12: Two Kinds of Crash	Stephen Abbo	ITV (ATV)	Exists
1969	Who-Dun-It	Episode 7: Death of a Cavalier	Rev. Harold Gorse	ITV (ATV)	Exists
1970	Codename	Episode 11: Appointment in Prague	Professor Radmore	BBC Two	Missing
1970	The Troubleshooters	Series 5, Episode 13: They Shall Not Pass	Albert	BBC One	Missing
1971	Paul Temple	Series 3, Episode 6: A Greek Tragedy	Father Nikolas	BBC One	Exists (German dub only)
1971	Paul Temple	Series 4, Episode 5: Party Piece	Socrates Kouvakis	BBC One	Exists (German dub only)
1971	Elizabeth R	Episode 2: The Marriage Game	Doctor Burcot	BBC Two	Exists
1971	Play for Today	Series 2, Episode 2: Edna The Inebriate Woman	Doctor	BBC One	Exists
1971	Owen, M.D.	Series 1 Episodes 21 & 22: The Weekenders, Pts. 1 & 2	Len Beavis	BBC One	Missing
1972	The Shadow of the Tower	Episodes 3, 4 & 6-9	Cardinal Morton	BBC Two	Exists
1972	Man of Straw	Episodes 3-6	Sötbier	BBC Two	Exists
1972	The Man Outside	Episode 10: Bye, Bye, Mrs Bly	Arthur	BBC One	Missing
1972	The Adventures of Black Beauty	Series 1, Episode 1: The Fugitive	Mr. Ryder	ITV (LWT)	Exists
1973	General Hospital	Episodes 125-127	Sir George Dysart	ITV (ATV)	Partial (Episode 126 only)
1974	General Hospital	Episodes 125-127	Sir George Dysart	ITV (ATV)	Partial (Episode 126 only)
1974	Crown Court	Series 3, Episode 113: Strange Past: Part 2	Dr. Simon Stone	ITV (Granada)	Exists
1974	Sutherland's Law	Series 3, Episode 5: Pay-Off	Lachy McCallum	BBC One	Missing
1975	Making Faces	Episode 3: Packaging Industry Convention 1963: A Christmas Box	Father Christmas	BBC Two	Missing
1976	I, Claudius	Episode 3: What Shall We Do About Claudius?	Livy	BBC Two	All programmes exist from this point
1976	Abide with Me	TV Movie	Mr. Spanier	BBC Two	All programmes exist from this point
1976	Brensham People	Episode 1: Going, Going, Gone	The Colonel	BBC Two	All programmes exist from this point
1977	Crown Court	Series 6, Episodes 19-21: Crime Passionel, Pts. 1-3	Dr. Simon Stone	ITV (Granada)	All programmes exist from this point
1977	Rooms	5 episodes	Sam Stafford	ITV (Thames)	All programmes exist from this point
1977	Marie Curie	Episodes 1 & 2	Professor Sklodowski	BBC Two	All programmes exist from this point
1977	Kilvert's Diary	Episode 2: Villaging	Farmer	BBC Two	All programmes exist from this point
1978	Coronation Street	Episodes 1770 & 1771	Ozzie	ITV (Granada)	All programmes exist from this point
1978	The Devil's Crown	Episode 12: Tainted King	Old Monk	BBC Two	All programmes exist from this point
1979	My Son, My Son	Episode 1	Michael Flynn	BBC One	All programmes exist from this point
1979	Blake's 7	Series 2, Episode 11: Gambit	Docholli	BBC One	All programmes exist from this point
1979	The Legend of King Arthur	Episodes 3 & 6	King Pelles	BBC One	All programmes exist from this point
1979	Testament of Youth	Episode 5: 1918	Dean of Hertford	BBC Two	All programmes exist from this point
1980	Doctor Who	Series 17: Shada (partially filmed; never broadcast)	Professor Chronotis	BBC One	All programmes exist from this point
1980	A Celebration of Sean O'Casey	Episode 2: Red Roses for Me	Verger Samuel	BBC Two	All programmes exist from this point
1981	Doctor Who	Series 18: The Keeper of Traken (2 episodes)	The Keeper	BBC One	All programmes exist from this point
1981	The Borgias	Episode 1	Cardinal of Venice	BBC Two	All programmes exist from this point
1982	Stalky & Co.	Episode 2: In Ambush	Col. Dabney	BBC One	All programmes exist from this point
1982	Month of the Doctors	Both episodes	Dr. Jordi Casals	BBC Two	All programmes exist from this point
1982	The Barchester Chronicles	Episodes 1 & 2	Skulpit	BBC Two	All programmes exist from this point
1983	Play for Today	Series 13, Episode 12: Atlantis	Ted	BBC One	All programmes exist from this point
1983	Jemima Shore Investigates	Episode 11: The Damask Collection	Inigo Cottle	ITV (Thames)	All programmes exist from this point
1984	The Country Diary of an Edwardian Lady	Episode 6: June	Professor Lanterl	ITV (Central)	All programmes exist from this point
1984	Dramarama	Series 2, Episode 8: Josephine Jo	Mr. Gardiner	ITV (Central)	All programmes exist from this point
1984	Big Deal	Series 1, Episode 9: Nine Bob Notes	School caretaker	BBC One	All programmes exist from this point
1985	Doctor Who	Series 22: Timelash (2 episodes)	Old man	BBC One	All programmes exist from this point
1986	Screen Two	Series 2, Episode 12: Hard Travelling	Wally	BBC Two	All programmes exist from this point
