= Timelash =

141 – Timelash
- Doctor Who serial

Cast
- Doctor: Colin Baker – Sixth Doctor
- Companion: Nicola Bryant – Peri Brown
- Others: Robert Ashby – The Borad; Denis Carey – Old Man; Paul Darrow – Tekker; Eric Deacon – Mykros; Neil Hallett – Maylin Renis; Jeananne Crowley – Vena; David Ashton – Kendron; David Chandler – Herbert; Tracy Louise Ward – Katz; Peter Robert Scott – Brunner; Dicken Ashworth – Sezon; Steven Mackintosh – Gazak; Christine Kavanagh – Aram; Martin Gower – Tyheer/Bandril Ambassador; Dean Hollingsworth – Android; James Richardson – Guardolier

Production
- Directed by: Pennant Roberts
- Written by: Glen McCoy
- Script editor: Eric Saward
- Produced by: John Nathan-Turner
- Music by: Elizabeth Parker
- Production code: 6Y
- Series: Season 22
- Running time: 2 episodes, 45 minutes each
- First broadcast: 9 March 1985
- Last broadcast: 16 March 1985

Chronology
← Preceded by The Two Doctors	Followed by → Revelation of the Daleks

Timelash is the fifth serial of the 22nd season in the British science fiction television series Doctor Who, which was first broadcast in two weekly parts on BBC1 on 9 and 16 March 1985.

In the serial, the Borad (Robert Ashby), the mutated leader of the planet Karfel, plots to start a war with the Bandril race which would wipe out both the Bandrils and Karfel's population so that the Borad could repopulate it with his own kind to rule the planet.

== Plot ==
The TARDIS is ensnared by a Kontron tunnel (similar to a time corridor) and is drawn to its source on the planet Karfel, which the Doctor has previously visited.

Its population is now ruled by the Borad, a sadistic ruler never seen in person, only via security monitors which reveal him to be an old man. His law is enforced by blue androids; and all rebels are dealt with either by summary execution or dispatch via the Timelash - exiled down a corridor of Time and Space. At the time of the Doctor's return, the neighbouring planet of Bandrils are posed to invade after the Borad rescinds the grain supply treaty which underpinned the relationship between the two civilisations.

Acting as a proxy for the Borad, the Maylin is the most senior of the five councillors of Karfel. When one of these fellow councillors, Mykros, actively plots with Maylin Renis to overthrow the Borad's rule, the Maylin is executed and Mykros sentenced to exile via the Timelash. Before he can be dispatched however, Vena - Renis' daughter and Mykros' lover - intervenes to plead for his life. When this fails, she steals an amulet conferring the power to the new Maylin - a sycophant named Tekker - and accidentally falls into the Timelash herself.

The arrival of the TARDIS presents Maylin Tekker with an opportunity to retrieve the amulet. When the Doctor refuses to help, Tekker explains that Peri has been taken hostage to ensure his co-operation. She has been taken to a cave of Morlox, large lizards indigenous to Karfel, but is rescued by some Karfelon rebels. However, they are soon captured by guards.

To protect Peri, the Doctor follows the Timelash tunnel back to Scotland in 1885. When he arrives he finds Vena with the amulet and a young man named Herbert. All return to Karfel, where the amulet is seized and the travellers rounded up with the rebels to await sentencing. They fight back and seal the chamber doors. The Doctor retrieves two kontron crystals from the Timelash, which he uses to create a time manipulator that allows him to slip out of the Chamber.

Tekker has meanwhile fled to the Borad, and blames the setback on the last remaining loyal Counsellor, Kendron, whom the Borad executes. Tekker remains with the Borad, now revealed to be a hideous amalgam of human and Morlox. They watch on a screen as Peri is brought into a cave and strapped down while Morlox gather to feed. A canister of the chemical Mustakozene-80 is placed nearby, which has the ability to fuse together the tissue of different species. The Borad has taken a liking to Peri and wishes to mutate her like himself. The Doctor arrives to confront Tekker and the Borad, recognising the latter as Megelen, a crazed scientist he encountered on his previous visit to Karfel and exposed to the Council for unethical experiments on Morloxes. Megelen wishes to replicate its effects to create a partner. His plan has been to provoke a war with the Bandrils that will result in their use of warheads which will wipe out all the Karfelons – but leave the Morlox and himself alive – allowing him to repopulate the world in his own image. This revelation prompts Tekker too to rebel, but he is aged to death. The Doctor then uses a Kontron Crystal to deflect Megelen's beam back at him, killing the mutant in his wheelchair.

Herbert helps the Doctor rescue Peri. They return to the Council Chamber where the imminent threat of a Bandril nuclear strike prompts the Doctor to take drastic action. He materialises the TARDIS in the path of the incoming warhead, risking his own life to save Karfel. He does so successfully and returns to Karfel to find Megelen returned from the dead and threatening the Council Chamber – or rather the other one was a clone of this original. Megelen is made unbalanced by the image of himself in a boarded up mirror, revealing the reason he hid himself away, and in this state is pushed into the Timelash by the Doctor, where he may have ended up as the Loch Ness monster (The Doctor says "he may be seen from time to time").

As they depart, the Doctor shows Herbert's calling card to Peri, which gives Herbert's name as Herbert George Wells.

=== Continuity ===
The Doctor's previous visit to Karfel is explicitly placed as an off-screen adventure during the Third Doctor's (Jon Pertwee) travels with Jo Grant (Katy Manning). A likeness of the Third Doctor is revealed behind a section of wall panelling in the Timelash control room, while Peri recognises a photograph of Jo. In the 2010 The Sarah Jane Adventures story Death of the Doctor, Jo describes her visit to the planet.

=== Outside references ===
This serial makes several references to Wells' novels: The Time Machine, The War of the Worlds, The Invisible Man, and The Island of Doctor Moreau.

== Production ==
The music for this story was provided by Elizabeth Parker, who had formerly contributed special sound for Blake's 7.

=== Cast notes ===
Paul Darrow had previously appeared in Doctor Who and the Silurians as Captain Hawkins. Denis Carey previously played Professor Chronotis in the incomplete serial Shada and the Keeper in The Keeper of Traken.

Darrow has acknowledged that producer John Nathan-Turner was initially unhappy with his performance, which he based on Richard III, and he was accused of "sending it up". However, he claims Nathan-Turner later praised him, saying: "You were absolutely right to do it that way - the script wasn't that good and you made something of it."

== Broadcast and reception ==
Episode	Title	Run time	Original release date	UK viewers (millions)
1	"Part One"	45:00	9 March 1985	6.7
2	"Part Two"	44:36	16 March 1985	7.4

Timelash was not well received by Doctor Who critics. Guest star Paul Darrow described Timelash as "the most disliked and also one of the most liked, which is fascinating". Graham Sleight noted that Timelash is "widely regarded as one of the worst series ever broadcast as part of Doctor Who", claiming the story has "a weak script, cheap-looking design, unimaginative direction, laughable special effects and some appalling performances". However, Sleight also praises Robert Ashby's performance as the Borad, claiming Ashby's performance "elevates his menace to an entirely different level to the rest of the story". Tat Wood described it as "a grindingly dull story only memorable for being made as a school panto with belated New Romantic 80s fashion errors". Wood singled out the story's script, production and costumes for particular criticism.

In The Discontinuity Guide, Timelash was criticised for "tacky sets and some dodgy acting" but was also said to be "nowhere near as bad as its reputation". Doctor Who: The Television Companion noted that the serial was not popular with fans of the show, but was at least "a reassuringly traditional Doctor Who adventure" in a season which contained "derivative, incomprehensible and inappropriately violent stories". In Doctor Who: The Complete Guide, Mark Campbell awarded Timelash seven out of ten, describing it as "an unfairly maligned homage to HG Wells and bad 'B' movies, Timelash is good, old-fashioned entertainment in a season brimming with macho portentousness. It all goes pear-shaped towards the end, but on the way there's plenty of fun to be had."

In 2013, The Daily Telegraph's Tim Stanley wrote of the serial: "The sets are bad, the acting is bad, the script stinks, the effects are laughable and – most importantly – Colin's Doctor is simply unlovable." Den of Geek's Andrew Blair selected Timelash as one of the ten Doctor Who stories that would make great musicals. Patrick Mulkern of Radio Times awarded the serial one star from five, describing it as "a turkey that's also a hoot". In his view, the serial was "codswallop served cold: boring Tardis scenes are intercut with stultifying political machinations on Karfel, a drab planet ruled by a lethargic lizard-man and about to be obliterated by glove-puppet Bandrils".

== Commercial releases ==
=== In print ===
Timelash
- Author: Glen McCoy
- Cover artist: David McAllister
- Series: Doctor Who book: Target novelisations
- Release number: 105
- Publisher: Target Books
- Publication date: December 1985 (Hardback) 15 May 1986 (Paperback)
- ISBN: 0-426-20229-5

A novelisation of this serial, written by Glen McCoy, was published by Target Books in December 1985.

A book length study of the serial, written by Phil Pascoe, was published as part of The Black Archive series from Obverse Books in 2019.

=== Home media ===
Timelash was released on VHS on 5 January 1998, and on DVD on 9 July 2007 with a commentary provided by actors Colin Baker, Nicola Bryant, Paul Darrow, and Robert Ashby along with a selection of other features.

It was released as part of the ‘Doctor Who The Collection: Season 22’ blu-ray box set on 20th June 2022.

=== Soundtrack ===
Doctor Who: Timelash

Soundtrack album by Elizabeth Parker and the BBC Radiophonic Workshop
- Released: 13 November 2026
- Genre: Soundtrack
- Label: Silva Screen

Doctor Who soundtrack chronology
Doctor Who: Series 10 (2025)	Doctor Who: Timelash (2026)	Doctor Who: The 60th Anniversary Specials (2026)

BBC Radiophonic Workshop chronology
Inventions for Radio (2023)	Doctor Who: Timelash (2026)

Music from this serial by Elizabeth Parker and the BBC Radiophonic Workshop was released on 13 November 2026.

==== Track listing ====
All tracks are written by Elizabeth Parker, except where noted.

Part One
No.	Title	Length
1.	"Doctor Who Opening Titles (Colin Baker Version, Mark Ayres Stereo Mix)" (Ron Grainer, arr. Peter Howell)
2.	"Karfel"
3.	"Inner Sanctum"
4.	"Fanfare: The Maylin Renis"
5.	"Banishment"
6.	"How's That Line?/Belt Up"
7.	"Time for Another Election"
8.	"Fanfare: The Maylin Tekker"
9.	"The Timelash"
10.	"Time Just Flies"
11.	"Feminist Sting"
12.	"The Flower of Many Faces"
13.	"The Morlox"
14.	"Herbert"
15.	"The Rebels"
16.	"1885 A.D."
17.	"Amulet"
18.	"Unpleasant Journey"

Part Two
No.	Title	Length
19.	"Unpleasant Journey reprise"
20.	"Where Are You Taking Me?"
21.	"The Edge of Oblivion"
22.	"Wired"
23.	"Kontron Crystals"
24.	"Peri Incarcerated"
25.	"Fidelity"
26.	"Doctor, Where Are You?"
27.	"Time Loop with Android"
28.	"The Bandrils are Coming"
29.	"The Borad"
30.	"Time Loop with Borad"
31.	"Herbert to the Rescue"
32.	"A Brave But Foolish Thing"
33.	"The Writing on the Wall"
34.	"Doctor Who Closing TItles (Colin Baker Version, Mark Ayres Stereo Mix)" (Grainer, arr. Howell)

Bonus tracks
No.	Title	Length
35.	"Timelash Suite (2025 Remaster)"
36.	"Timelash - Proto=Suite"
37.	"Timelash Suite [B.A.S.E. processed] (2025 Remaster)"
