= The Secret Garden (TV series) =

1975 British children's TV series

- DVD cover
- Genre: Children's drama
- Based on: The Secret Garden by Frances Hodgson Burnett
- Written by: Dorothea Brooking
- Directed by: Dorothea Brooking
- Starring: Sarah Hollis Andrews; Andrew Harrison; David Patterson; John Woodnutt
- Country of origin: United Kingdom
- Original language: English
- No. of episodes: 7

Production
- Producer: Dorothea Brooking
- Running time: 30 minutes
- Production company: BBC

Original release
- Network: BBC 1
- Release: 1 January – 12 February 1975

The Secret Garden is a 1975 British television adaptation of Frances Hodgson Burnett's 1911 novel of the same name. Adapted, produced and directed by Dorothea Brooking, it was first broadcast on BBC 1 in seven 30-minute episodes. This is the only BBC adaptation of the novel known to exist in its entirety. The 1952 adaptation is missing all eight episodes and the 1960 adaptation is missing three of its eight episodes.

== Plot ==
The series begins as Mary Lennox (played by Sarah Hollis Andrews) is abandoned by her parents and native attendants at her home in India due to a devastating outbreak of cholera. After the decease of her mother and father, she is discovered to be the only survivor by English colonist soldiers. She is sent to her uncle Archibald Craven's residence, Misselthwaite Manor in Yorkshire, England, to become his ward.

As she gradually becomes accustomed to her new surroundings, she befriends her maid Martha and Martha's brother Dickon. One night, upon hearing distant crying, Mary leaves her room to investigate and discovers her cousin, Colin. Colin is an invalid and bedridden, avoided by his father, demanding and hysterical and convinced that he will develop a hunchback like his father and die an early death. His presence was kept a secret from Mary by the housekeeper Medlock and the staff on his orders. With Mary's help, and intrigued by her stories of the moors, Dickon, and her eventual confession of finding the key to a hidden door into a neglected garden, he yearns to go outside and accompany Dickon and Mary in the garden as they seek to restore it back to life. Mary learns that the garden was beloved and tended by Colin's mother Lilias during her life. After a tragic fall caused her grave injuries, an early labour, and the birth of a sickly Colin, Lilias died. In Lord Craven's grief, he closed the garden away and hid the key, avoiding his son and sad memories of his wife's death. The passing years causes the garden to be almost forgotten, save for the old gardener Ben Weatherstaff, who—keeping a promise to Lilias to maintain her garden years before—enters the garden to prune the overgrowth.

In the process of restoring the bloom and verdure of the garden, Mary learns the value of love and care; Colin begins to believe in a healthy future for himself, and with the help of Mary and Dickon, gains the strength to walk. Colin's father Archibald, on receiving a letter from Mrs. Sowerby to return home, and experiencing a dream in which Lilias tells him to go to the garden, rushes back to the manor and finds Mary, Dickon, and his son Colin in the blooming garden—restored to health. Jubilant, they walk back to the manor together to the wonder and astonishment of the staff.

== Cast ==
- Sarah Hollis Andrews as Mary Lennox
- David Patterson as Colin Craven, Lord Craven's son and Mary's cousin
- Andrew Harrison as Dickon Sowerby, Martha's younger brother
- Jacqueline Hoyle as Martha, Mrs. Medlock's servant and Dickon's older sister
- John Woodnutt as Mr. Archibald Craven
- Hope Johnstone as Mrs. Medlock
- William Marsh as John
- Jennie Goossens as Nurse
- Tom Harrison as Ben Weatherstaff, the gardener
- Lorraine Peters as Mrs. Sowerby
- Richard Warner as Dr. Craven

== Episodes ==
No.	Title	Original release date
1	"There Is No-One Left"	1 January 1975
2	"The Cry in the Corridor"	8 January 1975
3	"The Door in the Wall"	15 January 1975
4	"I Am Colin"	22 January 1975
5	"A Tantrum"	29 January 1975
6	"When the Sun Went Down"	5 February 1975
7	"Magic"	12 February 1975

== Theme music ==
The soundtrack features a solo oboe playing "The Watermill" by Ronald Binge.

== Reception ==
The drama was nominated for a British Academy Television Award in 1976 in the drama/entertainment category, and in 1979 it was nominated in the children's entertainment series category at the 1979 Daytime Emmy Awards.
