= Glen McCoy =

British screenwriter, speaker and business coach

Glen McCoy (born 1954) is a British screenwriter, speaker, and business coach.

== Writing career ==
McCoy spent time with the London Ambulance Service at 19, and became one of the early batch of paramedics. It was during this time that he wrote Ambulance! (1982) published by David & Charles. As a television scriptwriter throughout the 1980s and 1990s, McCoy's credits include Angels, Emmerdale, EastEnders, and other soap operas.

One of his earliest commissioned BBC scripts was Timelash for the 22nd season of Doctor Who, screened in 1985. He subsequently novelised the story for Target Books. In 2006, he returned to Doctor Who when he contributed a story to Short Trips: The Centenarian, published by Big Finish Productions.

== Business ==
His business books include: Jobs in the Ambulance Service and Hospitals (Kogan Page), Getting Out of Debt (Management Books), Extraordinary Customer Care (Management Books) and Guerrilla Coaching (Management Books). McCoy has worked for companies like Vodafone, More Than, Land Rover, Mars, Phones 4u and Digicel.

He recently founded Carpe World, a 7-minute coaching-by-phone business, as well as FireStarter, a course in NLP and Business NLP with accreditation.
