= The Keeper of Traken =

114 (Note: From the Doctor Who Magazine series overview, in issue 407 (pp26-29). The Discontinuity Guide, which counts the unbroadcast serial Shada, lists this as story number 115. Region 1 DVD releases follow The Discontinuity Guide numbering system.) – The Keeper of Traken
- Doctor Who serial

Cast
- Doctor: Tom Baker – Fourth Doctor
- Companion: Matthew Waterhouse – Adric
- Others: Anthony Ainley – Tremas; Sheila Ruskin – Kassia; Denis Carey – The Keeper; John Woodnutt – Seron; Sarah Sutton – Nyssa; Margot Van der Burgh – Katura; Robin Soans – Luvic; Roland Oliver – Neman; Geoffrey Beevers – Melkur; Liam Prendergast – Foster

Production
- Directed by: John Black
- Written by: Johnny Byrne
- Script editor: Christopher H. Bidmead
- Produced by: John Nathan-Turner
- Executive producer: Barry Letts
- Music by: Roger Limb
- Production code: 5T
- Series: Season 18
- Running time: 4 episodes, 25 minutes each
- First broadcast: 31 January 1981
- Last broadcast: 21 February 1981

Chronology
← Preceded by Warriors' Gate	Followed by → Logopolis

The Keeper of Traken is the sixth serial of the 18th season of the British science fiction television series Doctor Who, which was first broadcast in four weekly parts on BBC1 from 31 January to 21 February 1981.

In the serial, the alien time traveller the Master (Geoffrey Beevers) seeks a power on the planet Traken known as the Source which he wishes to use to restore his life.

The end of the serial introduces Anthony Ainley as the Master. The serial is also the debut of Sarah Sutton as companion-to-be Nyssa.

== Plot ==
In the TARDIS, the Fourth Doctor and Adric arrive back in N-Space in the Traken Union, an empire of peace and harmony. A holographic image of the elderly Keeper of Traken appears in the TARDIS to ask Doctor's help. The Keeper explains that his title is about to pass on to Consul Tremas, giving him access to the powerful Source that is the centre of Traken's technological advancement, but senses evil within him, his wife Kassia, and his daughter Nyssa. The Keeper suspects a connection to Melkur, an evil creature that arrived years ago but became calcified. Melkur has since become something of a holy symbol, and Kassia has been tasked with talking to it and keeping it clean.

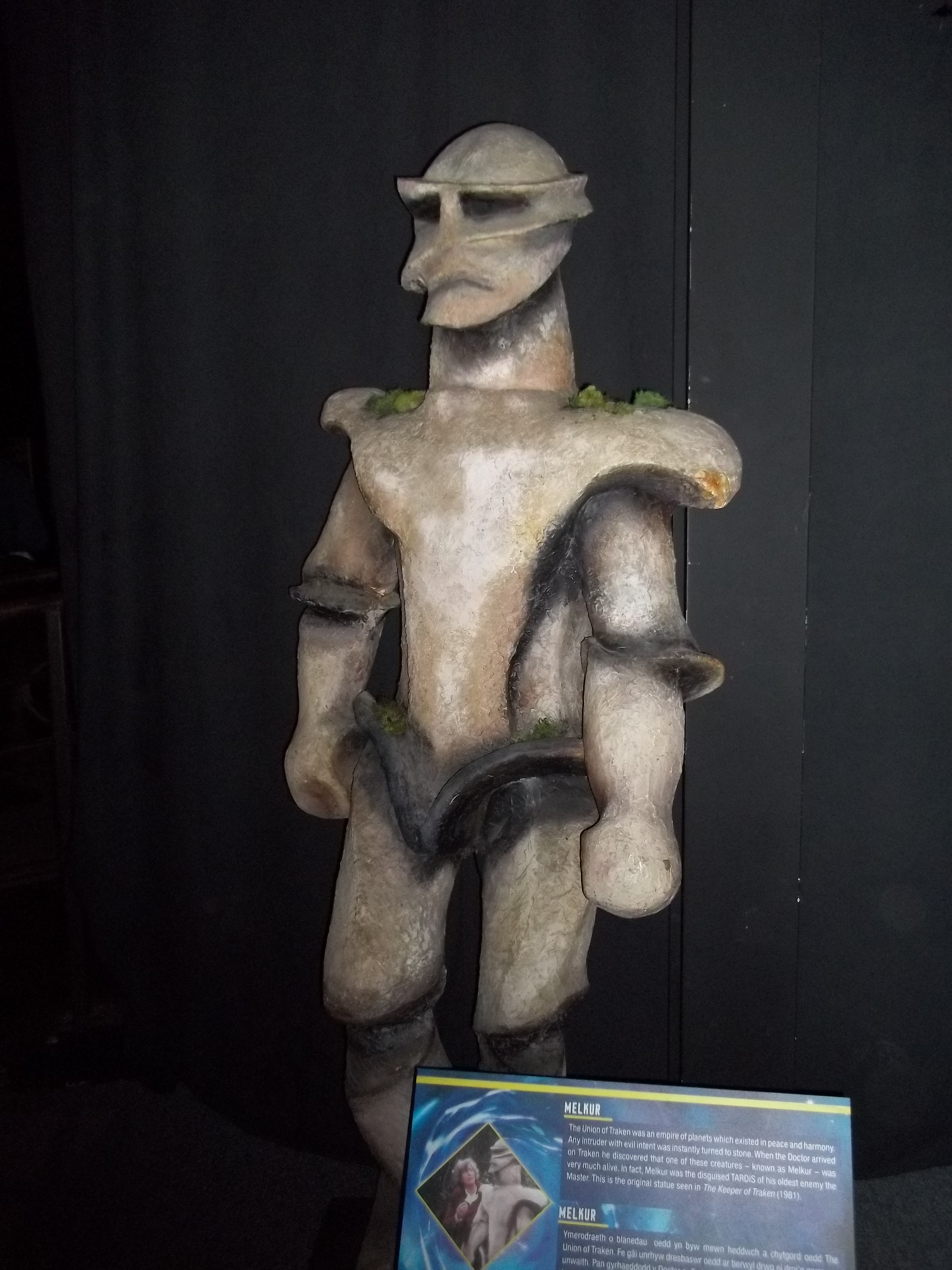
Melkur, as shown at the Doctor Who Experience.

When the Doctor and Adric land at Traken's capital and visit the Keeper, their presence appears to cause the Keeper to warn the assembled group of a great evil. Though Tremas vouches for them, others remain cautious about their presence. Soon, bodies in the grove are found, the Doctor and Adric determine they have been killed by some type of plasma weapon. Adric works with Nyssa to identify the energy signature of the plasma as being from a TARDIS, while the Doctor assists Tremas in defusing the conflict over their presence. Unbeknownst to either group, Kassia secretly visits Melkur, who gives her a collar to wear, providing the creature with mind-control over her while promising to keep her husband safe. Kassia is able to convince the guards to arrest Tremas, the Doctor, Adric and Nyssa, and uses the situation to convince the other Consul to install her as the next Keeper. When the Keeper dies, Kassia takes the throne, but as the pivotal moment of the ceremony is completed, she disappears, leaving the statue of Melkur in her place, now connected to the Source.

Having escaped, the Doctor and his allies seek to shut down the Source to stop Melkur from using it. As Adric and Nyssa prepare to activate it, the Doctor is drawn into the statue of Melkur, finding it to be a TARDIS. Inside a horribly disfigured Master. He reveals he is on his last regeneration, and seeks to use the Source to give him a new set of regenerations, and then attempts to subdue the Doctor. At the same time, Adric and Nyssa initiate the shutdown, disconnecting the Source from the Master and causing his TARDIS to malfunction. The Doctor escapes the Master's TARDIS, and when Melkur disappears, another Consul takes the throne to restabilise the Source before it completely dies.

After ensuring all is well, the Doctor and Adric depart in his TARDIS. Later, Tremas discovers an alien longcase clock, and is transfixed to it when the Master emerges from it and merges their bodies. The newly reformed Master laughs as he re-enters the clock—his TARDIS—and dematerialises, leaving Nyssa wondering where her father has gone.

== Production ==
This story came about when the script editor suggested to Johnny Byrne that he use the subjects of millennialism and the effects of a long-serving head of state dying. The producer wanted to include a character that would give a sense of familiarity when Tom Baker, who had been the Doctor for several years, left and the new lead actor took over. To this end the Master replaced the villain in Byrne's draft.

The Melkur statue's design was based on a 1913 statue by Umberto Boccioni. The decaying Master's robe was the same costume that had been used in The Deadly Assassin.

=== Cast notes ===
Geoffrey Beevers is credited as the Melkur to conceal the plot twist of the Master's return. The Melkur statue was played by Graham Cole. Denis Carey, who plays the Keeper, also played Professor Chronotis in the uncompleted Fourth Doctor serial Shada, and the Old Man in the Sixth Doctor story Timelash (1985). Margot Van der Burgh had previously appeared as Cameca in the First Doctor serial The Aztecs (1964). John Woodnutt also appeared in Spearhead from Space (1970), Frontier in Space (1973) and as Commander Broton in Terror of the Zygons (1975). Robin Soans subsequently appeared in the Twelfth Doctor episode "Face the Raven" (2015).

== Broadcast and reception ==
Episode	Title	Run time	Original release date	UK viewers (millions)
1	"Part One"	24:05	31 January 1981	7.6
2	"Part Two"	24:50	7 February 1981	6.1
3	"Part Three"	23:49	14 February 1981	5.2
4	"Part Four"	25:11	21 February 1981	6.1

The story was repeated on BBC1 (except BBC1 Wales) across four consecutive evenings from Monday to Thursday, 10–13 August 1981, achieving viewing figures of 5.2, 4.4, 5.2 and 5.0 million viewers respectively.

Patrick Mulkern of Radio Times awarded the episode four stars out of five. Writing for Doctor Who The Episode Guide, Mark Campbell regarded the episode as "a welcome respite from the so-called 'hard' science of Season 18." Charlie Jane Anders wrote positively of Nyssa's debut, and lamented her wasted potential in subsequent appearances.

== Commercial releases ==
=== In print ===
Doctor Who and the Keeper of Traken
- Author: Terrance Dicks
- Cover artist: Andrew Skilleter
- Series: Doctor Who book: Target novelisations
- Release number: 37
- Publisher: Target Books
- Publication date: 20 May 1982
- ISBN: 0-426-20148-5

A novelisation of this serial, written by Terrance Dicks, was published by Target Books in May 1982.

=== Home media ===
The Keeper of Traken was released on VHS in September 1993. In January 2007, it was released on DVD alongside Logopolis and Castrovalva, as part of the "New Beginnings" box set. It is also included in the Season 18 Blu-ray box set.
