= John Hosier =

British musician and broadcaster (1928–2000)

- Born: 18 November 1928; Kingsbury, Middlesex, England
- Died: 28 March 2000 (aged 71); London, England
- Occupation: Music educator

John Hosier CBE (18 November 1928 – 28 March 2000) was an English musical educator. He was born with stunted fingers so was unable to play most musical instruments himself. Later in life, when asked about his hands by children, he said he used to bite his fingernails too much.

== Early life ==
John Hosier was born in the northwest London suburb of Kingsbury, Middlesex. His father, Harry Hosier, was the co-founder of the building firm Hosier and Dickinson alongside G.W. Dickinson, a Master Builder. His mother, Constance, was a violinist. She overcame the problem of his playing a musical instrument by teaching him to play the xylophone. He attended Fryent Primary School, Kingsbury, Preston Manor County Grammar School, now Preston Manor High School, Wembley and St John's College, Cambridge where he also served as a director of Footlights from 1950 to 1951.

== Career ==
Hosier's career began in 1953 when he was appointed as a music producer for BBC Radio for schools, a position he held until 1959. Then from 1960 until 1973 he worked in BBC Television for schools. He was producer of the Schools Television programme Music Time.

From 1973 until 1976, he was the inspector for Inner London Education Authority and the director of the Centre for Young Musicians.

From 1978 until 1989, he was the principal of the Guildhall School of Music and Drama at the Barbican Arts Centre. During the trial of the musician Philip Pickett, it emerged that the parents of one of the students raped by Pickett had written to Hosier to complain. The parents were told to take their child elsewhere for lessons. Police discovered evidence within the archives of the school that in 1984 the then principal John Hosier had written to Pickett, asking him to discuss the allegations. Hosier passed police a letter regarding the allegations and his frustrations. The following year, the Guildhall awarded Pickett a Fellowship, one of its highest honours.

In 1986, Hosier worked with Leonard Bernstein for the Barbican Centre's Leonard Bernstein Festival. He became a Commander of the Order of the British Empire in 1984. In 1989 he was appointed Director of the Hong Kong Academy for Performing Arts, a position he held for five years until 1993. He was director of the Early Music Centre in London from 1994 until his death in 2000.

He was the long-term partner of Biddy Baxter, the editor of the BBC's children's television programme Blue Peter, and married her shortly before he died. In 2003, Baxter established the John Hosier Music Trust which offers scholarships to students to take up post-graduate studies.
