= Sarah Hollis Andrews =

English child actress

- Born: Sarah J. A. Hollis; 1962; Bristol, Gloucestershire, England
- Occupation: Actress
- Years active: 1975–77

Sarah Hollis Andrews (born Sarah J. A. Hollis) is a former English child actress, best known for playing the role of Mary Lennox in the British television adaptation of Frances Hodgson Burnett's The Secret Garden, and now continuing her career using the name Holly Hamilton.

== Career ==
Hollis Andrews' breakthrough role was that of Mary Lennox in the BBC children's drama The Secret Garden, an adaptation of Frances Hodgson Burnett's novel of the same name. She was discovered at an open call reading by director Dorothea Brooking, who praised her as "the best Mary," she had directed in her 3 productions of the beloved children's novel.

This serial was first shown in 1975. Her only other roles were in the Children's Film Foundation production The Man from Nowhere (1975), and the TV series The Peppermint Pig (1977).

Hollis Andrews is the daughter of actors John Hollis and Gabrielle Hamilton. She appeared alongside her mother in all three of her acting credits.
