= John Nathan-Turner =

British television producer (1947–2002)

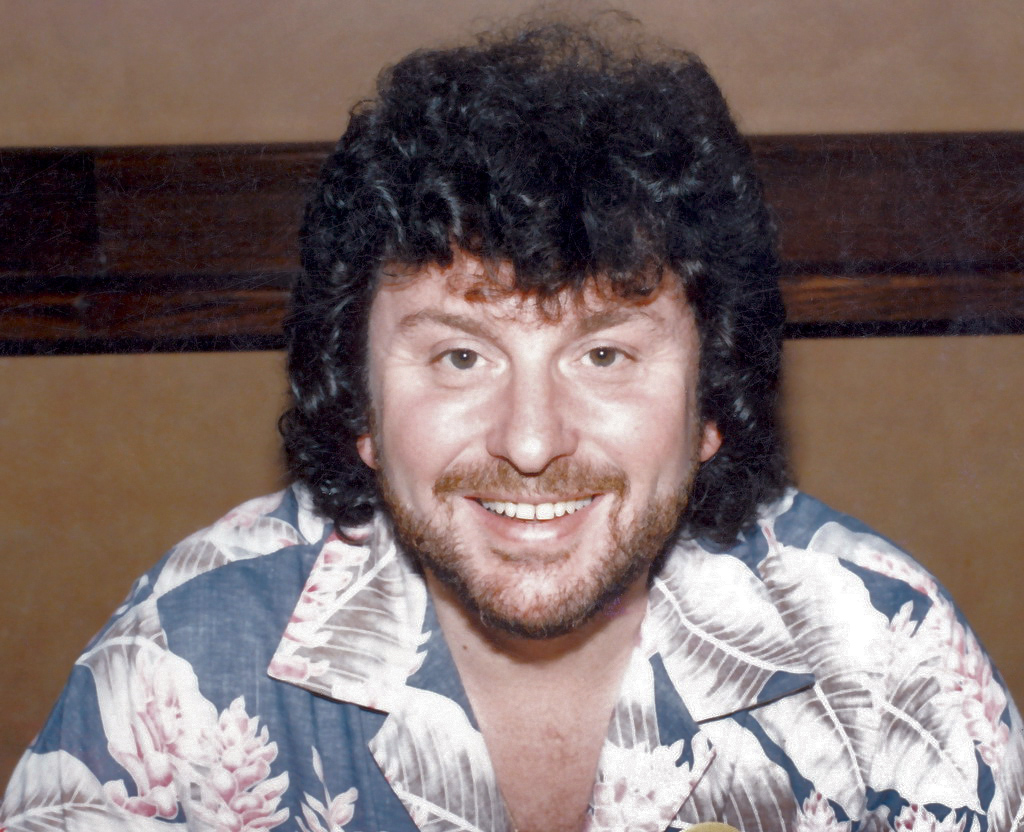
- Nathan-Turner at Whovent in September 1986
- Born: John Turner; 12 August 1947; Birmingham, Warwickshire, England
- Died: 1 May 2002 (aged 54); Brighton, East Sussex, England
- Occupation: Television producer
- Known for: Producer of Doctor Who (1980–1989)
- Partner: Gary Downie (1972–2002)

John Turner (12 August 1947 – 1 May 2002), known professionally as John Nathan-Turner, was an English television producer. He was the ninth producer of the long-running BBC science fiction series Doctor Who and the final producer of the series' first run on television (from 1980 until it was cancelled in 1989). He finished the role having become the longest-serving Doctor Who producer and cast Peter Davison, Colin Baker and Sylvester McCoy as the Fifth, Sixth and Seventh Doctors, respectively.

== Early life ==
Born John Turner in Birmingham, he adopted the double-barrelled stage name John Nathan-Turner to distinguish himself from the British actor John Turner. He was educated at King Edward VI Aston School in Birmingham, where he showed an early interest in acting and theatre. His earliest television acting work was as an extra in TV productions for ITV, including Crossroads and The Flying Swan. Both shows were made in Birmingham (the former at ATV's Aston studios). On leaving school, he initially worked as an actor and assistant stage manager at Birmingham's Alexandra Theatre.

Turner was later taken on by the BBC as a television floor assistant, working on every type of show (from light entertainment to news and current affairs), including–more importantly for his later career–drama. Shows produced by the BBC's drama department that he worked on included The Pallisers, How Green Was My Valley, Angels, and All Creatures Great and Small. An assignment to the BBC's light entertainment department also led to him spending two years working on The Morecambe and Wise Show, prior to the act's move to ITV in 1978.

== Doctor Who ==
Having joined the BBC as a floor assistant in the 1960s, he first worked on Doctor Who in 1969 as part of the floor crew at a time when the series was recorded in Studio D at the BBC's Lime Grove Studios. The first serial he worked on was the Patrick Troughton story The Space Pirates in 1969.

Nathan-Turner worked as an assistant floor manager on two serials in the Jon Pertwee era of Doctor Who: The Ambassadors of Death (1970) and Colony in Space (1971). He later worked on Doctor Who in the Tom Baker era as production unit manager under producer Graham Williams from 1977 to 1979. When Williams decided to leave the show after three seasons and the BBC management's first choice to replace him, George Gallaccio, turned it down, he accepted the post of producer for season 18, which would also become the last to feature Baker as the Fourth Doctor.

Due to Nathan-Turner's relatively young age at 33, and lack of previous experience as a producer, the newly appointed Head of Series & Serials (and, therefore, technically Doctor Who’s uncredited executive producer) Graeme MacDonald asked former Doctor Who producer Barry Letts (now working on the Sunday Classic Serials), to “keep an eye” on the show, since the newly combined Series & Serials role left MacDonald with less time to focus on Doctor Who. Nathan-Turner's experience of working with Graham Williams helped form his views on the future direction of the series. He strongly felt that people working on the programme (especially Williams, script editor Douglas Adams and star Tom Baker) had stopped taking the show seriously: it was parodying science fiction, rather than presenting serious storylines. He also believed that Williams had allowed Baker too much influence on the show's direction, rather than confronting Baker over his increasingly comedic acting style. Nathan-Turner, together with new script editor Christopher H. Bidmead, decided Baker's creative influence needed to be reined in.

Nathan-Turner decided on a new broom approach, and instituted sweeping changes: replacing the arrangement of the theme music which had run throughout the 1970s with a more contemporary electronic arrangement by Peter Howell, and introducing revamped opening titles (featuring a new photograph of Baker, replacing the original taken in 1974) and a new closing credit sequence. Nathan-Turner also dispensed with the services of long-time composer Dudley Simpson, who had provided the incidental music for the majority of the Doctor Who serials of the 1970s and all of the Williams era stories. With Simpson departed, the Doctor Who incidental music under Nathan-Turner's stewardship would be provided by electronic composers including Peter Howell, Paddy Kingsland, Malcolm Clarke, Roger Limb, Jonathan Gibbs, Keff McCulloch, and Mark Ayres.

As Nathan-Turner had no writing or script-editing experience, the choice of the stories for production was largely left to Bidmead. This at once led to difficulties, with the second story to enter production, Meglos (1980), suffering from all the problems which Nathan-Turner had identified in the show's scripts under Graham Williams (a lack of realism, an over indulgence in comedy). Nathan-Turner's first major story influence was in bringing back the Master, but the details of this he left to Bidmead. At the end of Nathan-Turner's first season in charge, both Bidmead and Letts left their posts on the series along with Tom Baker, and Lalla Ward, who had played companion Romana, also left partway through the season in Warriors' Gate (1980). Letts was not replaced, leaving Nathan-Turner as sole producer. Nathan-Turner cast Peter Davison as the Fifth Doctor for season 19, having previously worked with him on All Creatures Great and Small. Bidmead was briefly replaced with Antony Root, then more permanently with Eric Saward, who would work as script editor (and occasional writer) of the series from 1982 until 1986.

After Nathan-Turner brought the Master back for three consecutive stories, The Keeper of Traken (1981), Logopolis (1981) and Castrovalva (1982, now played on a regular basis by Anthony Ainley), he believed that the show could benefit from the publicity inherent in bringing back popular characters and monsters from its past. Earthshock (1982) enjoyed considerable publicity from featuring the return of the Cybermen, after an absence of seven years. Season 20 then saw the return of Omega, the Mara, the Black and White Guardians (from the Key to Time season), and Brigadier Lethbridge-Stewart. The Daleks and Davros also returned in Resurrection of the Daleks (1984), but the re-use of classic villains often proved complex for script editor Eric Saward and the show's writers. Nathan-Turner, however, was largely focused on generating publicity for the series, something which he also achieved by the device of casting high profile, well-known actors (sometimes from the world of light entertainment) as guest stars.

Nathan-Turner rarely used directors or writers who had worked for previous producers. The few exceptions were director Pennant Roberts (who directed Warriors of the Deep and Timelash), and the writers David Fisher (who wrote The Leisure Hive), Terrance Dicks (who wrote State of Decay and "The Five Doctors"), and Robert Holmes (who wrote The Caves of Androzani, The Two Doctors, The Mysterious Planet and the first episode of The Ultimate Foe).

By coincidence, Nathan-Turner's tenure occurred during a period of large growth in the show's fan base in the United States, thanks to repeated showings there of the Tom Baker serials on affiliates of the American Public Broadcasting Service (PBS) network. Nathan-Turner became a familiar face among the many Doctor Who celebrities who made appearances during PBS fundraising drives, held to finance the purchase of more Doctor Who serials for screening in the United States.

In addition to his work on the television series, for some years during the Eighties Nathan-Turner's interest in light entertainment led to him producing an annual Christmas Pantomime, at the Tunbridge Wells Theatre, starring the incumbent Doctor and other members of the cast. The first of these, in December 1982, starred Peter Davison and co-starred Anthony Ainley (the Master) and the actress Sandra Dickinson (who at that time was Davison's wife, but later guest starred in Doctor Who with Jon Pertwee, on Ghosts of N-Space).

During his time producing Doctor Who, Nathan-Turner wrote two books about the programme, Doctor Who: The TARDIS Inside Out (1985) and Doctor Who: The Companions (1986).

=== Contentious decisions ===
Criticism of his production decisions was wide-ranging, from employing too many back-references (thereby limiting the scriptwriters, and confusing the casual viewer), to employing excessive violence in Colin Baker's 1985 season, to his hostility to using writers and directors from the show's past, and in the casting of guest stars best known for roles from light entertainment rather than from drama (including Rodney Bewes, Beryl Reid, Richard Briers, Ken Dodd and Hale and Pace). Patrick Mulkern of Radio Times argued that "John Nathan-Turner should be applauded for enticing big-name guest stars and his 'stunt casting' of actors in wildly inappropriate roles often pays off", although he cited Briers as an example who was "shockingly bad".

He was criticised for the casting of companions purely as gimmicks: the character Tegan Jovanka (an Australian air-stewardess played by Janet Fielding) was introduced solely to curry favour with viewers in Australia; whilst Peter Davison reported that the American character Peri Brown (played by Nicola Bryant) was introduced only in an attempt to endear the show to American viewers. Davison has said Nathan-Turner's decision to introduce an American companion merely to appeal to the American market was one of his reasons for leaving the show, as he felt it was wrong for the series, but led to his realising that – despite being its star – the direction of the series was out of his control, and he could do nothing about decisions he disagreed with.

In 1985, BBC1 controller Michael Grade enforced an 18-month hiatus on Doctor Who, publicly criticising the series as tired, violent and unimaginative. In 1986, after the series had returned (with fewer episodes in the season), Grade insisted that Nathan-Turner replace the actor he had cast as the Sixth Doctor, Colin Baker, as a condition of it continuing. According to an interview with Peter Davison in 2018, Baker was "the victim" because "the power structure in the BBC had changed and they didn't want John Nathan-Turner around."

Nathan-Turner also received criticism from his former executive producer, Barry Letts, for introducing the question mark motif on Tom Baker's costume. Peter Davison, Colin Baker and Sylvester McCoy all said they were not happy with their wardrobe in the series. Davison disliked what he considered the "designer look" of his cricket attire; Baker didn't approve of the tasteless multi-coloured outfit he was given (as he detailed in the documentaries The Story of Doctor Who and Trials and Tribulations); while McCoy was dissatisfied with his pullover being covered in question marks, which he found "overstated". Writing for The Guardian, Tim Dowling thought it "certainly undermined a lot of his darker scenes".

Eric Saward, who joined Doctor Who as script editor in season 19 (1982), had a tumultuous working relationship with Nathan-Turner and quit the programme during production of season 23 (1986). In September 1986, an interview with Saward was published in issue No. 97 of Starburst magazine in which Saward voiced scathing criticism of Nathan-Turner.

Nathan-Turner's casting decisions for the central role of the Doctor have also been criticised. Former script editor Terrance Dicks said of the three actors he cast: "The magic wasn't quite there." Former producer Philip Hinchcliffe stated that, following Tom Baker's departure, the series "became a bit pantomime for me" and that Baker's successors lacked the "moral conviction" the earlier actors brought to the role. Eric Saward disagreed with the casting of Colin Baker in particular, saying he lacked "the energy and eccentricity that the part calls for", and complained that Nathan-Turner hadn't discussed casting decisions with him. Saward was also unhappy with the casting of Bonnie Langford as Mel Bush, saying: "I don't think she can act, let alone bring anything to the show."

Terrance Dicks was particularly scathing of Nathan-Turner's production of Doctor Who during an interview in 2013: "There was a decline, without a doubt. I think the people working on it, particularly John Nathan-Turner, were not fit for purpose, as it were. Colin Baker, for example, never got a chance with that silly costume, which I thought was a great shame. I was sorry, but I wasn't surprised when they took it off." Composer and audio engineer Mark Ayres made an impassioned defence of Nathan-Turner on the DVD commentary for The Greatest Show in the Galaxy, stating: "John gets a lot of criticism as a producer but he was absolutely fantastic in giving people a chance: new writers, new composers, new actresses. And a lot of what John did didn't work, let's be honest, but when it does work I think you get something really quite special."

== Later career ==
After the series ended in 1989, and until shortly before his death, Nathan-Turner continued to be involved in Doctor Who-related events, and remained a familiar face at conventions for many years afterwards.

In the early 1990s, while working for BBC Video, Nathan-Turner produced and wrote several Doctor Who videotape documentary releases: The Hartnell Years, The Troughton Years, The Pertwee Years, The Tom Baker Years, The Colin Baker Years, Daleks: The Early Years, Cybermen: The Early Years, and a special release of the unfinished story Shada with Tom Baker doing first person linking narration as the Fourth Doctor in place of the missing scenes.

Also during the early 1990s, Nathan-Turner produced the earliest Doctor Who commercial releases on audio cassette, for the BBC Radio Collection, creating narrated adaptations of television serials for which only the soundtrack remained. In these, he mixed the surviving soundtrack with a narration (written by himself) explaining the missing pictures, using as narrator actors who had played the Doctor. As Patrick Troughton had died in 1987, Nathan-Turner contracted Jon Pertwee (for The Tomb of the Cybermen), Tom Baker (for The Evil of the Daleks), and Colin Baker (for The Macra Terror) to narrate Troughton-era stories which, at the time of the link narration recordings, were all missing from the BBC's television archives except for episode 2 of The Evil of the Daleks. Nathan-Turner left his roles at BBC Video and the BBC Radio Collection at the end of 1992.

Nathan-Turner co-presented the BSB 31 Who programmes during their 1990 Doctor Who Weekend, and co-wrote the 1993 charity special Dimensions in Time for the show's 30th Anniversary. Nathan-Turner made his final contribution to Doctor Who in March 2002, six weeks before his death, when he gave his final interview on a location visit to what was used during the Resurrection of the Daleks recordings in 1983. This last interview from March 2002 first appeared on the November 2002 original DVD release of Resurrection of the Daleks.

== Personal life ==
A long-term drinker and smoker, Nathan-Turner was in poor health in the last years of his life. He contracted an infection and died in hospital on 1 May 2002, aged 54. Nathan-Turner lived for many years in London, with a home also in Saltdean, Brighton.

Nathan-Turner was an out gay man. His long-term partner, Gary Downie, was also a BBC employee (ultimately becoming a production manager with BBC Television). They met in 1972, and worked together on All Creatures Great and Small, where Nathan-Turner was production unit manager (Downie was the assistant floor manager at BBC Pebble Mill on the third series), and on Doctor Who. Downie, who was born Roderick Pinkus in South Africa in 1940, died on 19 January 2006. He spoke of his life with Nathan-Turner in an interview with Doctor Who Magazine.

Richard Marson's book, JN-T: The Life and Scandalous Times of John Nathan-Turner (2013), alleges inappropriate sexual behaviour on the part of Nathan-Turner and Downie by stating that the two men were preying on male teenage fans during the 1980s, who were under the age of consent for gay men at the time (which was 21 in the UK, compared to 16 for heterosexual relationships). He also alleges that Nathan-Turner made unwanted advances towards him.

== Books ==
- Doctor Who – The TARDIS Inside Out (May 1985, Picadilly Press Ltd., by John Nathan-Turner and illustrated by Andrew Skilleter, Paperback; October 1985, Random House Children's Books (library), Hardback)
- Doctor Who: The Companions (November 1986, Picadilly Press Ltd., by John Nathan-Turner and illustrated by Stuart Hughes, Paperback; January 1987, Random House Children's Books (library), Hardback)
- JN-T: The Life and Scandalous Times of John Nathan-Turner By Richard Marson ISBN 9781908630131 (May 2013, Miwk Publishing Ltd.)

Preceded by Graham Williams	Doctor Who Producer; 1980–89	Succeeded by Peter V. Ware (as title); Philip Segal (as showrunner)
