= Sarah Andrews (immunologist) =

American immunologist

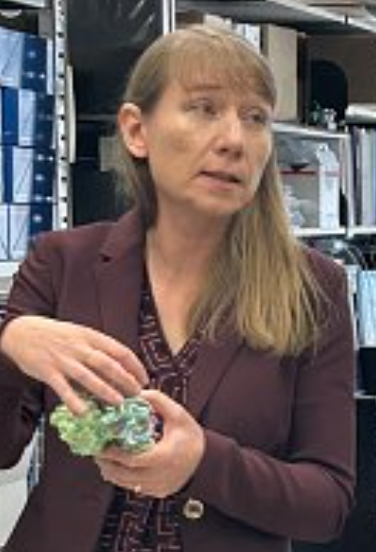
- Education: Oregon State University; University of Washington
- Scientific career
- Fields: Immunology
- Institutions: National Institutes of Health
- Doctoral advisor: David J. Rawlings

Sarah F. Andrews is an American immunologist serving as chief of the B Cell Immunobiology Section at the Vaccine Research Center, part of the National Institute of Allergy and Infectious Diseases. Her research focuses on B cell responses to influenza infection and vaccination, with an emphasis on the impact of early-life flu exposures and pandemic preparedness.

== Education ==
Andrews earned a B.S. in microbiology from Oregon State University in 2000. She pursued graduate studies at the University of Washington, where she received her Ph.D. in immunology in 2008. During her doctoral training, Andrews researched B cell development and tolerance under the mentorship of David J. Rawlings. She conducted postdoctoral research at the University of Chicago in the laboratory of Patrick C. Wilson, where she studied the human B cell response to influenza vaccination.

== Career ==
In November 2014, Andrews joined the Vaccine Research Center at the National Institute of Allergy and Infectious Diseases (NIAID) as a staff scientist in the vaccine immunology program. Her research focuses on the immunobiology of B cells in the context of Phase I influenza vaccine trials.

In 2024, Andrews was appointed chief of the B Cell Immunobiology Section at the Vaccine Research Center. Her research investigates how preexisting immunity from flu infections acquired early in life affects immune responses to influenza infection and vaccination decades later. In one clinical trial, Andrews and her team studied the immune response to a specific flu strain in participants whose birth years determined whether they had prior exposure to that strain. Andrews is involved in pandemic preparedness efforts. In one study, her team retrieved samples from individuals vaccinated with an avian influenza vaccine in 2010 to identify antibodies capable of neutralizing the bird flu strains currently circulating among birds and cows. Through high-throughput screening, they discovered five antibodies with broad and potent neutralizing abilities.
