= Monica Sims =

British radio executive

Monica Louie Sims OBE (27 October 1925 – 20 November 2018) was a British BBC Radio producer who became Head of Children's Programmes, BBC Television, and then Controller of BBC Radio 4. She was also a vice-president of the British Board of Film Classification, and Director of the Children's Film Foundation.

== BBC career ==
She spent three seasons working in theatres in Windsor and Bristol before joining BBC Radio as a Talks Producer, where she rose to become Editor of Woman's Hour, a position she held until 1967. She then moved to BBC Television as Head of Children's Programmes from 1967 to 1978 where she "believed passionately that the child audience deserved the best possible service and she, like her predecessors fought hard to increase the range of programming and the BBC’s investment in it".

She moved back to BBC Radio to become Controller of BBC Radio 4, replacing Ian McIntyre, a position she held from 1978 until 1983. The features producer Piers Plowright described her as "tactful but firm ... never a hair out of place, always elegant but with steel running through her". She described Radio 4 as providing "Surprise, through different perspectives on life through satire, poetry, storytelling, songs, argument, defining ideas, contact with opinion formers, writers, scientists, historians, philosophers and imaginative stimulus through works of art, music, drama, literature."

== Early life ==
She lived at 'Brimps' at Upton St Leonards. Her mother was heavily involved with the WI at Tuffley.

In the late 1930s she took part in many drama productions, and at the Girls High School and with the Electrical Association for Women, and took part in speech events at the Cheltenham Music Festival. She left school in 1943 to study an English degree at the University of Oxford, at the same time and place as Margaret Thatcher. At university, she joined the drama society, with Harold Hanbury, taking part in a production of the Taming of the Shrew, as Bianca Minola.

== Later career ==
In 1985 Monica Sims produced a report Women in BBC Management. It revealed that the number of women in top jobs was virtually the same as it had been a decade before - 6 women compared with 159 men. The report concluded with nineteen recommendations, including the appointment of a women's employment officer; more career guidance for both women and men; an examination of the policy on Appointments Boards for senior posts; an increase in the number of women attending Management Training Courses and the introduction of women-only courses as an experiment. Part-time work, job sharing and further options for flexible working should also be encouraged.

After leaving the BBC she was also a Vice President of the British Board of Film Classification and Director of the Children's Film Foundation.

She died on 20 November 2018 at the age of 93, at Richmond Village, Painswick, Gloucester.

Preceded by Owen Reed	Head of BBC Children's Programmes; 1967–1978	Succeeded by Edward Barnes
