= Biddy Baxter =

English television producer (1933–2025)

Biddy Baxter MBE
- Baxter with the Blue Peter badge she devised
- Born: Joan Maureen Baxter; 25 May 1933; Leicester, England
- Died: 10 August 2025 (aged 92); London, England
- Education: Wyggeston Girls' Grammar School; St Mary's College, Durham
- Occupation: Television producer
- Known for: Editing Blue Peter for 23 years
- Spouse: John Hosier (died 2000)

Joan Maureen "Biddy" Baxter, MBE (25 May 1933 – 10 August 2025) was an English television producer. She was best known for editing BBC Television's children's magazine show Blue Peter from 1965 to 1988, devising much of the format that is still used today.

== Life and career ==
=== Early life ===
Baxter was born on 25 May 1933 at Regent Hospital, Leicester, Leicestershire, to Bryan Reginald Baxter and Dorothy Vera, née Briers. Her father was a teacher, who later became the director of a sportswear company, and her mother was a pianist. She grew up at 'Brydor' on Syston Road in Thurmaston in the 1930s, then at 92 Highway Road in the 1940s.

At Highway Road, she helped to raise money for the city's Spitfire fund in 1940. After the war, aged 12, she took part in the Leicester Drama Society at the Little Theatre and drama productions at Wyggeston Girls' School, at such playing Isabella Thorpe in Northanger Abbey in 1951.

Baxter was educated at Wyggeston Girls' Grammar School, Leicester. Her nickname of "Biddy" was assigned at school because there were too many girls with the name "Joan" in her class. She visited her old school on Saturday 28 June 1975, at a garden fete, and attended another reunion at her college in April 1987.

Baxter studied at St Mary's, a women's college at Durham University, between 1952 and 1955. At a meeting with the careers officer at her university, Baxter noticed information about working for the BBC. "It wasn't that I was being snotty about secretarial work or teaching, I just didn't want to do either of them," she said in 2013 of the options offered to her on this occasion. "This particular teaching officer seemed to me – though maybe I was being unduly sensitive – to have this blind spot about women. All the men were going off to do these amazing things. I really should be grateful to him".

After graduating with a social sciences degree, Baxter joined the BBC as a studio manager in 1955, becoming a producer of schools' English programmes in 1958, and of Listen with Mother in 1961. After moving to a temporary post in 1962 within BBC Television owing to a staff shortage, she gained a permanent post as producer of Blue Peter from November 1962, and remained directly responsible for the programme for just over a quarter of a century.

=== Blue Peter ===
First broadcast on 16 October 1958, Blue Peter had originally been devised by John Hunter Blair, but it was Baxter and her deputy Edward Barnes, later head of BBC children's television, who developed the format into a successful programme, initially on a budget of only £180 per edition. When they were first introduced, Barnes was told: "You'll have to look after Biddy – she doesn't know very much", to his considerable irritation.

Baxter devised and introduced the Blue Peter badge in 1963 to encourage children to send in programme ideas, pictures, letters and stories and also she introduced the now famous annual appeals. She was awarded a gold badge herself when she retired as editor from the programme. Having been disappointed as a child to receive the same reply twice to different letters that she had written to Enid Blyton, she also introduced a card index system so that Blue Peter viewers could receive more personal responses. Baxter became programme editor in April 1965 following a reorganisation, while Barnes and Rosemary Gill became producers when the programme began to be broadcast twice a week in 1964.

Baxter was a divisive figure for some ex-presenters. Valerie Singleton said Baxter treated the presenters like children. Peter Purves said Baxter always gave "criticism rather than praise" and "riled me to bits", but he also said: "The programme succeeded – and I've said this many times – because of her, not in spite of her. She absolutely ruled it; I didn't always agree with her views, but she was right." Yvette Fielding said Baxter bullied her repeatedly until she decided to resign in 1988 after her first year of presenting, although she was persuaded to stay, and Baxter retired later that year. Fielding described Baxter as "incredibly cruel", stating she was constantly criticised for her presenting style.

=== Post–Blue Peter ===
Baxter's final programme in the role of editor aired on 27 June 1988; her partner had accepted a job offer in Hong Kong. After returning from Hong Kong in 1993, Baxter continued to work for the BBC, as a consultant to directors-general Michael Checkland and John Birt.

In the 1981 New Year Honours, Baxter was appointed Member of the Order of the British Empire (MBE), in recognition of her work as editor of Blue Peter; she received her insignia from Queen Elizabeth at Buckingham Palace, on 10 February 1981. She was also a fellow of the Royal Television Society, and received honorary DLitt degrees from Newcastle University in 1988 and the University of Durham in 2012.

In September 2008, Baxter expressed dissatisfaction with the way Blue Peter was being run and said that she believed that the BBC was trying to close the programme down.

In November 2013, Baxter was announced as the recipient of the Special Award at the BAFTA Children's Awards in 2013. Baxter was praised by Anna Home, former head of BBC Children's Television, on receiving the award. Home told Jane Martinson of The Guardian in 2013: "Somehow she was overlooked. If anyone deserves to be recognised she does ... Blue Peter is a legend and she is Blue Peter".

In June 2014, Baxter was a guest on BBC Radio 4's Desert Island Discs. Her musical choices included "Deo Gracias" from A Ceremony of Carols by Benjamin Britten, the final chorus from the St Matthew Passion by Johann Sebastian Bach and "Milord" by Édith Piaf. Her book choice was The Traveller's Tree by Patrick Leigh Fermor.

=== Personal life and death ===
Baxter's long-term partner was John Hosier, the music producer and educator. She married him shortly before he died in March 2000.

Baxter died on 10 August 2025, at the age of 92. She had suffered from breast cancer and Alzheimer's disease.
