= Dorothea Brooking =

English children's television producer and director

Dorothea Brooking (née Smith Wright; 7 December 1916 – 23 March 1999) was an English children's television producer and director. She also contributed to works for television, mainly early in her career, and in other capacities.

== Life and career ==
Dorothea Smith Wright was born into a theatrical family in Eton, Buckinghamshire (now part of Berkshire), and educated at Busage House and a finishing school in Montreux, Switzerland. Before the Second World War, she was an actress, under the name Daryl Wilde, and a member of the Old Vic company, when she met her husband John Brooking, who had the stage name of John Franklyn. During two years of the war, while her husband was in Africa, Brooking worked on the staff of a radio station in Shanghai. She managed to leave China with her son before the Japanese invaded. She and Franklyn divorced in 1951.

After returning to London, Brooking worked for the BBC's Overseas Service as a continuity announcer before being appointed as a producer in 1950 for the BBC's Children's Department at Lime Grove Studios. For more than 30 years, she was responsible for numerous adaptations of children's classics for television such as The Secret Garden (1952, 1960 and 1975) and The Railway Children (1951 and 1957).

She left the BBC in the mid-1960s after a period in schools' broadcasting, and went freelance. When Monica Sims was appointed to head the revived Children's Department in 1968 (it was part of a department for the family from 1963), Brooking returned to the BBC. She also undertook adaptations of contemporary works, including one of Philippa Pearce's novel Tom's Midnight Garden (1974).

In the 1960s, she met Wilfred Synge, an archaeologist, but in 1971, Synge died two weeks before they were due to be married.

Brooking's last responsibility as a director was the Haunting of Cassie Palmer (1982) for Television South (TVS), commissioned by Anna Home, then the station's head of children's and youth programmes. In her history of children's television, Into The Box of Delights (1993), Home describes Brooking as "one of the most influential makers of drama from the early Fifties onwards".

Brooking won the Pye Award for distinguished services to children's television in 1980.
