= Richard Marson =

English television producer

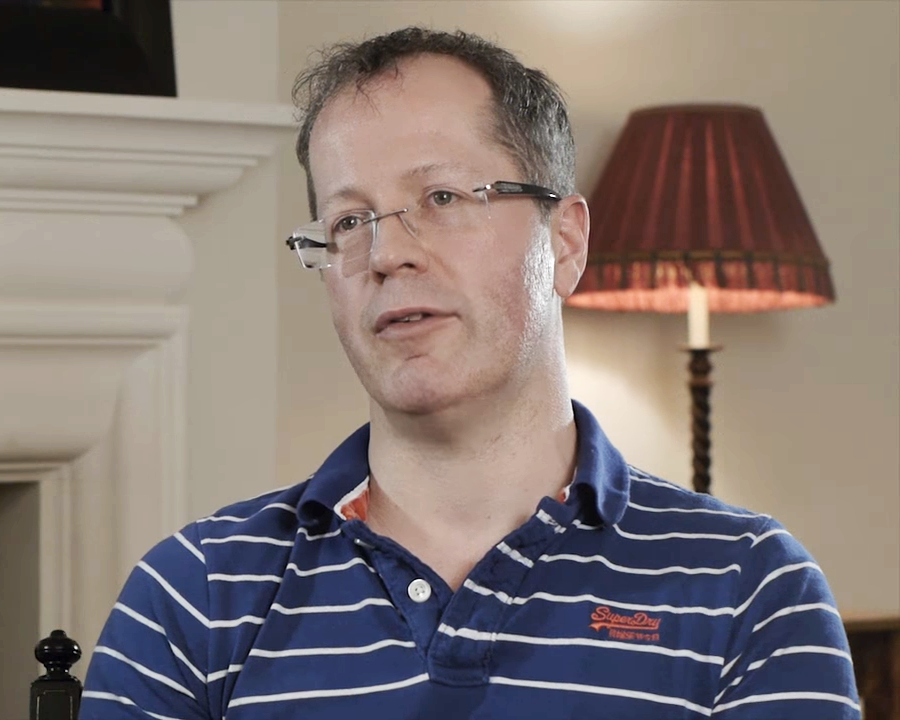
Marson in 2013

Richard Marson (born July 1966) is an English writer, television producer and director, best known as a former editor-in-chief of the BBC's children's television programme Blue Peter. In September 2007, Marson was sacked from his post for making an editorial decision on the naming of the new Blue Peter cat, thus overriding the results of online vote on the programme in January 2006. Despite this, he remains the programme's "unofficial historian".

Marson has directed and produced a number of documentaries, including Children's TV on Trial, Upstairs Downstairs Remembered, and Tales of Television Centre (2012).

== Early life and career ==
Marson was educated at Felsted School followed by Durham University, where he read for a degree in English, graduating in 1987. As a student he contributed to Doctor Who Magazine and put on plays as a member of Durham University Sensible Thespians (DUST), which would later evolve into the Durham Revue sketch group.

Marson won his first Blue Peter badge in 1972, which influenced him to pursue a career with the BBC in 1988. He worked on many TV programmes, including Going Live!, Top of the Pops, and eventually Blue Peter. Between 1983 and 1988, he wrote for Doctor Who Magazine.

Following five years as a freelance worker as a producer and director for such companies as Disney, Planet 24, and London Weekend Television, Marson returned to the BBC to direct Record Breakers and Tomorrow's World, eventually joining Blue Peter as a producer in 1998. Marson became first the series producer and then the editor of the show, before being sacked in September 2007.

== Competition controversies ==
In October 2006, Blue Peter ran a competition called "Whose Shoes?". More than 13,800 people entered, with calls costing 10p each, including 3.25p for a Unicef charity. Because of technical difficulties, the researcher was unable to access callers' details, and subsequently selected the winner from a guest in the studio without referring the decision to the editor, deputy editor, or producer.

Along with this, Blue Peter staff ignored the result of the online poll to name a new kitten, ignoring the winning name – "Cookie" – and calling the pet "Socks" instead. According to former editor Biddy Baxter's book Dear Blue Peter (see page 283), Marson "had been so concerned about the accuracy of the online votes he made an editorial decision that the kitten (with its four white paws) should be named 'Socks' rather than 'Cookie'. Richard was an inspired editor. His dismissal was a great blow to the programme." Because of Marson's handling of and failure to report the incident he was sacked from CBBC. He had already left Blue Peter in July 2007. Blue Peter was fined £50,000 by Ofcom. The BBC subsequently apologised for the error of judgement.

== Later career ==
He has produced and directed a 90-minute documentary about BBC Television Centre, called Tales of Television Centre, which was first shown on BBC Four on 17 May 2012. The programme had a preview screening at BFI Southbank two days before its first transmission. The documentary was commissioned to commemorate the ending of the Centre's role in the Corporation's activities and the site's likely sale.

His biography of the last 'classic' Doctor Who producer JNT: The Life and Scandalous Times of John Nathan-Turner was published in 2013 by Miwk Publishing. This work details Nathan-Turner's career, his difficulties with BBC superiors and alleges inappropriate behaviour by the producer. This was followed in 2015 by a biography of Doctor Who's first producer, Verity Lambert.

== Son's death ==
Richard Marson's son Rupert Marson, 14, died at their St Albans home in 2008. Police were called to the house on the morning of 8 June, whereupon Rupert Marson was pronounced dead at the scene. At the inquest a verdict of "accidental death" was declared.
