= Valerie Singleton =

English TV and radio presenter (born 1937)

Valerie Singleton OBE
- Born: 9 April 1937 (age 89); Hitchin, Hertfordshire, England
- Education: Royal Academy of Dramatic Art
- Occupations: Television presenter; radio presenter
- Years active: 1959–present
- Notable work: Blue Peter (1962–1976); The Money Programme (1980–1988)

Valerie Singleton OBE (born 9 April 1937) is an English television and radio presenter. She is best known as a regular presenter of the BBC Television children's series Blue Peter from 1962 to 1972. She also presented the BBC Radio 4 PM programme for ten years, as well as a series of radio and television programmes on financial and business issues, including the BBC's The Money Programme from 1980 to 1988.

== Early life ==
Valerie Singleton was born on 9 April 1937 in Hitchin, Hertfordshire, the daughter of Dennis Singleton OBE, an advertising executive with J. W. Thompson and formerly a wing commander in the Royal Air Force Volunteer Reserve and Eileen Singleton LRAM (née Reed). She studied dancing at the Arts Educational School, London, and at the age of twelve appeared as a young dancer in Cinderella at the Finsbury Park Empire. When Singleton was 16, she danced in Aladdin at the King's Theatre, Edinburgh, with Stanley Baxter playing Wishee Washee, and she was also a young singer in the Ovaltineys. She went on to spend two years at the Royal Academy of Dramatic Art, winning a scholarship for her first term, and she began her career as an actress at the New Theatre in Bromley.

== Career ==
=== Career beginnings and acting work ===
For several years Singleton pursued her acting career, including Nest of Robins, a No 1 Tour starring Jessie Mathews and Sonnie Hale. In 1959, she starred in the BBC television sitcom The Adventures of Brigadier Wellington-Bull. She began presenting on BBC Radio in 1963, hosting On the Sunny Side of the Street for the Light Programme. She was also a reporter on BBC2's Time Out in 1964. She became a voice over commentator for television commercials and presented, with Arnold a cartoon character, the Arnold Doodle Show on ITV on Sundays.

=== Blue Peter ===
Singleton joined the BBC in 1961 as a television continuity announcer and on 3 September 1962 joined Blue Peter, where she remained as a regular weekly presenter until 3 July 1972. She appeared alongside Christopher Trace and John Noakes. In 1967, when Peter Purves joined created the "Val, John and Pete" line up and are often referred to as "the dream team". 1971, Singleton accompanied Princess Anne (later the Princess Royal) to Kenya on the Princess's first overseas trip as the newly assigned President of the Save the Children Fund, for the film Blue Peter Royal Safari. In 1998, the two women met to reminisce about the Royal safari for Blue Peter's fortieth anniversary programmes. At Christmas 1971, Singleton and the rest of the Blue Peter presenting team hosted the annual Disney Time on BBC1.

The documentary Blue Peter Royal Safari led to the spin-off series, Blue Peter Special Assignments, in which Singleton was solo presenter. This was shown at weekends and ran from 1973 to 1981. Initially each edition focused on European capital cities, but later covered islands and the homes of well-known historic figures. After making the last of her "in studio" appearances on Blue Peter in October 1975, Singleton was featured in the end-of-year "review". She returned in January 1976 to mark the death of the first Blue Peter cat, Jason. Just a few weeks later, producer Edward Barnes wrote to tell her that as she was no longer associated with the show in any genuine sense, they were replacing her as the presenter of the Special Assignment series. Her fees were reportedly a factor in their decision.

The programme continued to repeat items featuring Singleton for many years, and she returned for a final series of the Special Assignment spin-off in 1981, reporting on the Yukon and Niagara Rivers. For both the 20th and 25th anniversary editions of Blue Peter in 1978 and 1983 respectively, Singleton moderated the live link-ups from around the UK to launch the anniversary badge balloon hunts, thus extending her presenting career to 21 years. As a guest, she presented the "Outstanding Endeavour" award to its young recipient on the programme's 30th anniversary edition. Richard Marson states in his Blue Peter 50th Anniversary book that "Singleton never really left Blue Peter".

During her time on Blue Peter, Singleton presented another BBC children's show, Val Meets The VIPs, a chat show that ran for three series during 1973–74. Each edition featured an interview with a single public figure to which an audience of children were invited to put across their questions. A guest in March 1973 was the then Secretary of State for Education Margaret Thatcher, who when asked if she would like to be Prime Minister said that she did not have enough experience, nor would there be a "woman Prime Minister in my lifetime".

=== Later work ===
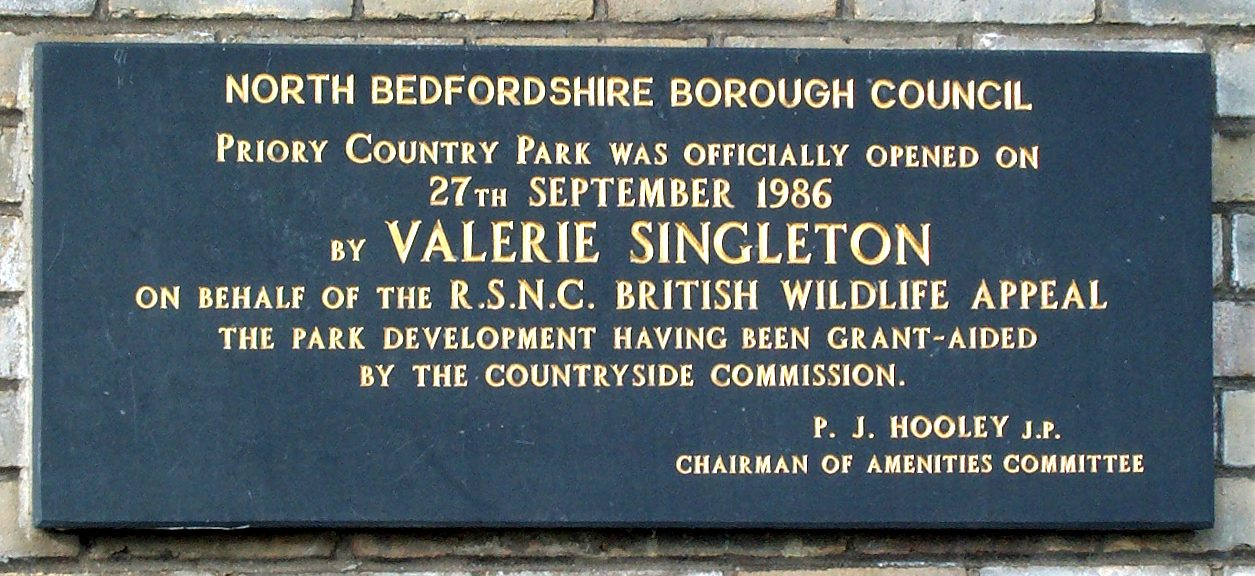
Plaque commemorating Singleton's opening of Priory Country Park

Having co-hosted a special programme about Metrication in July 1973, Singleton joined Nationwide in October 1973 as the show's "Consumer Unit" presenter with Richard Stilgoe, later becoming one of the main hosts of the show. Singleton was the co-anchor of Nationwide's royal wedding coverage in November 1973. She left Nationwide in 1978 to present the BBC's late-night news programme Tonight, replacing Sue Lawley. In 1980, she was the presenter of BBC2's series A Kind of Childhood. She made a brief return to Nationwide in the summer of 1983, presenting a series of films looking at people forced to leave their homeland and settle in Britain.

Singleton hosted many other programmes, notably undertaking a ten-year stint on the Monday-to-Friday BBC Radio 4 PM programme beginning in 1982 (having previously presented the station's Midweek with Valerie Singleton) and eight years presenting BBC2's The Money Programme from September 1980 to March 1988. While hosting PM, Singleton admitted she had a difficult relationship with co-presenter Hugh Sykes and threw a cup of water in his face while live on air. For the 1983 UK General Election held on 9 June, Singleton covered the results from two constituencies, Torbay and Truro. She interviewed the winning candidates, Frederic Bennett (Torbay) and David Penhaligon (Truro), after the results for the BBC's Election results programming.

When she left PM in 1993, Singleton presented a travel programme for ITV and became a regular travel writer for several national publications. She made a one-off return to PM on 29 February 2016 to co-present a special "Leap Day" programme, alongside Eddie Mair. In 1994, she was awarded the OBE for her services to children's television.

In the 1990s, Singleton made a guest appearance in the "Mr. Blobby" segment of Noel's House Party during the bank duties as well as presenting the quiz show Backdate on Channel 4. In the late 1990s, she presented 12 episodes of Playback for the History Channel, a programme that asked well-known figures about events that have influenced the course of their lives. In 2019, she appeared in Can I Improve My Memory? for Channel 4. She was an early enthusiast for and patron of the painter Jack Vettriano. In 2005, the story of Singleton's move from London to Dorset and the sale of the flat she had lived in for more than forty years was reported in The Times.

Singleton was the subject of This Is Your Life in 2001, when she was surprised by Michael Aspel. Earlier, in 1974, she had been the featured castaway on Desert Island Discs.

== Personal life ==
Singleton has never married or had children. In an interview, she said she has had several partners over the years, including actor Albert Finney. Whilst on Blue Peter she had an abortion and during her time as a presenter she had a one-night fling with her co-star Peter Purves. She was also once engaged to radio presenter and DJ Pete Murray from 1967 to 1971.

She said in 2008 that she liked "the pirate type. And men who give me what I call BSE – a big sexual experience."

In 2020, Singleton was living in Templecombe, Somerset.
