= Edward Barnes (television executive) =

British television executive (1928–2021)

- Born: Edward Campbell Barnes; 8 October 1928
- Died: 8 September 2021 (aged 92)
- Occupations: Television executive and producer
- Employer: BBC
- Known for: Presenting: Newsround; Blue Peter

Edward Campbell Barnes (8 October 1928 – 7 September 2021) was a British television executive and producer who worked for the BBC. He was credited with creating the children's television programme Newsround.

== Biography ==
Barnes was educated at Milton Abbey School, an independent boarding school for boys, in Milton Abbas, Dorset. Barnes was a co-creator of Blue Peter in 1958, and the programme's assistant director. He was later a producer of the series. With colleague Biddy Baxter, Barnes toured London pet shops in late 1962 after the show's mongrel puppy died and a clandestine substitute (soon known as Petra) was needed to avoid upsetting viewers.

Barnes was the originator of the longstanding children's television news programme Newsround, in April 1972; originally, it was known as John Craven's Newsround. At the time, he was deputy head of children's television at the BBC. Newsround was created to explain stories to children that would not be comprehended equally well on the main news. It was met with resistance when he formulated it, and was a controversial idea for some of his colleagues. Newsround was the first to bring the Space Shuttle Challenger disaster to British television on 28 January 1986.

Barnes's wife was the writer Dorothy Smith, who was a contributor to Blue Peter. The couple, who had three children, were married from 1950 until Smith's death in 1992.

== Death ==
Barnes died on 8 September 2021, at the age of 92, from COVID-19 during the COVID-19 pandemic in England.

Media offices
Preceded by Monica Sims	Controller: BBC Children's Television; 1978–1986	Succeeded by Anna Home
