= BBC Radiophonic Workshop discography =

Catalogue of published recordings by the BBC Radiophonic Workshop

- Studio albums: 6
- Soundtrack albums: 21
- Compilation albums: 10
- Singles: 12
- Sound effect albums: 6
- Stock music library albums: 6
- Box Sets: 3

This is the discography of the BBC Radiophonic Workshop, a British electronic music group. It consists of releases of music and sound effects.

== Studio albums ==
Year	Album details	Notes
1969	The Seasons: Released 1969; Label: BBC Radio Enterprises (RESR 7); Formats: LP, CD	Music by David Cain
1973	Fourth Dimension: Released 1973; Label: BBC Records (RED 93 S); Formats: LP	Music by Paddy Kingsland
1978	Through A Glass Darkly: Released 1978; Label: BBC Records (REC 307); Formats: LP	Music by Peter Howell
2014	Radiophonic Workshop: Released December 2014; Label: Bowers & Wilkins (SOS79); Formats: Subscriber-only download	
2017	Burials In Several Earths: Released 19 May 2017; Label: Room 13 (RWSCD001 [CD]; RWSLP001 [4x10" LP]; RWSDL001 [download]); Formats: 2xCD, 4x10" LP, WAV/FLAC, mp3	
2017	Everything You Can Imagine Is Real: Released 30 June 2017; Label: Room 13 (RWSDL002); Formats: cassette, WAV/FLAC, mp3	

== Soundtrack albums ==
Year	Album details	Notes
1984	The Living Planet: Released 1984; Label: BBC Records (REB 496); Formats: LP, CD	Music by Elizabeth Parker
2015	The Vendetta Tapes: Released 25 September 2015; Label: Buried Treasure Records (BUTR8); Formats: CD, LP	Music by John Baker
2018	The Changes: Released 21 April 2018; Label: Silva Screen (SILLP1540); Formats: 2-LP (limited), download	Music by Paddy Kingsland
2018	Possum: Released 26 October 2018; Label: Room 13 (RWSCD003 [CD]; RWSDL003 [download]); Formats: CD, WAV/FLAC, mp3	
2018	The Box of Delights: Released December 2018; Label: Silva Screen (SILCD1547); Formats: CD	Music by Roger Limb
2019	The Stone Tape: Released 13 April 2019; Label: Silva Screen (SILLP1548); Formats: 10" green vinyl (limited)	Music by Desmond Briscoe
2021	La Planète Sauvage (with Stealing Sheep): Released: 23 November 2021 (limited colored vinyl), 21 January 2022; Label: Fire Records (FIRE653); Formats: 2LP, CD	Re-imaged score for the 1973 animated film Fantastic Planet

=== Doctor Who soundtrack albums ===
Year	Album details	Notes
1978	BBC Sound Effects No. 19 - Doctor Who Sound Effects: Released 1978; Label: BBC Records (REC 316); Formats: LP, cassette (CS), CD	
1983	Doctor Who - The Music: Released 1983; Label: BBC Records (REH 462); Formats: LP, CS, CD	Reissued on CD in 1992 as Earthshock - Classic Music From The BBC Radiophonic Workshop Volume 1.
1985	Doctor Who - The Music II: Released 1985; Label: BBC Records (REH 552); Formats: LP, CS, CD	Reissued on CD in 1992 as The Five Doctors - Classic Music From The BBC Radiophonic Workshop Volume 2.
1993	Doctor Who: 30 Years at the BBC Radiophonic Workshop: Released 5 July 1993; Label: BBC Records (BBCCD 871); Formats: CD	
2000	Doctor Who at the BBC Radiophonic Workshop Volume 1: The Early Years 1963–1969: Released 2000; Label: BBC Music (WMSF 6023-2); Formats: CD	
2000	Doctor Who at the BBC Radiophonic Workshop Volume 2: New Beginnings 1970–1980: Released 2000; Label: BBC Music (WMSF 6024-2); Formats: CD	
2002	Doctor Who at the BBC Radiophonic Workshop Volume 3: The Leisure Hive: Released 2002; Label: BBC Music (WMSF 6052-2); Formats: CD	Music and effects by Peter Howell and Dick Mills
2002	Doctor Who at the BBC Radiophonic Workshop Volume 4: Meglos & Full Circle: Released 2002; Label: BBC Music (WMSF 6053-2); Formats: CD	Music by Paddy Kingsland and Peter Howell
2013	Doctor Who – The Caves of Androzani: Released 25 March 2013; Label: Silva Screen (SILCD1370); Formats: CD, 2xLP, Download	Music by Roger Limb
2013	Doctor Who – The Krotons: Released 13 May 2013; Label: Silva Screen (SILCD1371); Formats: CD, 10" LP, Download	Special sounds by Brian Hodgson
2018	Doctor Who – The Five Doctors: Released 14 September 2018; Label: Silva Screen (SILCD1553); Formats: CD, 2-LP	Music by Peter Howell with special sounds by Dick Mills
2020	Doctor Who – The Visitation: Released 1 May 2020; Label: Silva Screen (SILCD1570); Formats: CD, Vinyl	Music by Paddy Kingsland
2023	Doctor Who – Revenge of the Cybermen: Released 24 November 2023 (SILCD1585); Label: Silva Screen; Formats: CD, Vinyl	Music by Peter Howell augmenting Carey Blyton's original score
2026	Doctor Who – Timelash: Released 13 November 2026; Label:Silva Screen; Formats: CD	Music by Elizabeth Parker

== Sound effects albums ==
Year	Album details	Notes
1976	Out of This World: Released 1976; Label: BBC Records (REC 225); Formats: LP, CD	Reissued on CD in 1991 as Essential Science Fiction Sound Effects Vol. 2.
1977	Sound Effects No. 13 – Death & Horror: Released 1976; Label: BBC Records (REC 269); Formats: LP	Produced by Mike Harding
1978	Sound Effects No. 21 – More Death & Horror: Released 1976; Label: BBC Records (REC 340); Formats: LP	Produced by Mike Harding
1981	BBC Sound Effects No. 26 - Sci-Fi Sound Effects: Released 1981; Label: BBC Records (REC 420); Formats: LP, CD	Reissued on CD in 1991 as Essential Science Fiction Sound Effects Vol. 1, reissued on CD under the original title in 2013.
1982	Even More Death & Horror – Sound Effects No. 27: Released 1982; Label: BBC Records (REC 452); Formats: LP	Produced by Mike Harding
1984	Hi-Tech FX - Sound Effects No.29: Released 1984; Label: BBC Records (REC 531); Formats: LP, CD	Released on CD in 1991 as Essential Hi Tech Sound Effects with the 1991 Tomorrow's World 3-D stereo demonstration

== Compilation albums ==
Year	Album details	Notes
1968	BBC Radiophonic Music: Released 1968; Label: BBC Radio Enterprises (REC 25M); Formats: LP, CD	
1975	The Radiophonic Workshop: Released 1975; Label: BBC Records (REC 196); Formats: LP, CD	
1979	BBC Radiophonic Workshop - 21: Released 1979; Label: BBC Records (REC 354); Formats: LP, CD	
1983	The Soundhouse: Released 1983; Label: BBC Records (REC 467); Formats: LP, CS, CD	
1990	Essential Death & Horror Sound Effects Vol. 1: Released 1990; Label: BBC Enterprises (BBC CD 822); Format: CD	Compilation of the tracks produced by Mike Harding from the first sides of all three Death and Horror albums
1990	Essential Death & Horror Sound Effects Vol. 2: Released 1990; Label: BBC Enterprises (BBC CD 823); Format: CD	Compilation of the tracks produced by Mike Harding from the second sides of all three Death and Horror albums
2003	Music from the BBC Radiophonic Workshop: Released 8 November 2003; Label: Rephlex (CAT 147 LP); Formats: 4x10" LP	Collects and re-orders BBC Radiophonic Music (1968) and The Radiophonic Worlshop (1975)
2008	The John Baker Tapes – Volume 1: BBC Radiophonics: Released July 2008; Label: Trunk Records (JBH028CD); Formats:CD, LP	Music by John Baker
2008	BBC Radiophonic Workshop - A Retrospective: Released November 2008; Label: The Grey Area (phonic 3 cd); Formats: CD	
2017	Radiophonica: Released 10 April 2017; Label: Electronic Sound (001); Format: CD	CD included in a limited bundle with issue 28 of the Electronic Sound magazine.

== Stock music library albums ==
Year	Album details	Notes
1994	Poisoned Planet: Released 1994; Label: Cavendish Music (CAVCD 55); Formats: CD	Music by Elizabeth Parker, Peter Howell, Roger Limb, Malcolm Clarke and Richard Attree
1994	Undersea World: Released 1994; Label: Cavendish Music (CAVCD 56); Format: CD	Music by Elizabeth Parker, Peter Howell, Roger Limb, Malcolm Clarke and Richard Attree
1994	Africa: Released 1994; Label: Cavendish Music (CAVCD 57); Format: CD	Music by Peter Howell, Roger Limb, Malcolm Clarke and Richard Attree
1994	Time And Space: Released 1994; Label: Cavendish Music (CAVCD 58); Format: CD	Music by Elizabeth Parker, Peter Howell, Roger Limb, and Malcolm Clarke
1994	Ethnic Impressions: Released 1994; Label: Cavendish Music (CAVCD 59); Format: CD	Music by Elizabeth Parker, Peter Howell, Roger Limb, Malcolm Clarke and Richard Attree
2012	Retro Electro: Released 15 March 2012; Label: Universal Publishing Production Music (BBCPM005); Format: CD	Music by Paddy Kingsland

== Box sets ==
Year	Album details	Notes
1993	Radiophonic Workshop: Released 1993; Label: Cavendish Music; Format: 5-CD	Box set of five stock music albums: Poisoned Planet; Undersea World; Africa; Time And Space; Ethnic Impressions
2020	Four Albums 1968 - 1978: Released 29 August 2020; Label: Silva Screen (SILCD1599); Format: 6-CD	Box set released for Record Store Day 2020 including: BBC Radiophonic Music (1968); Fourth Dimension (1973); The Radiophonic Workshop (1975); Through A Glass Darkly (1978); The Body in Question single (1981); The Changes (2018); The Stone Tape (2019)
2023	Inventions for Radio: Released 8 December 2023; Label: Silva Screen (SILLP1598); Format: 6-LP, 6-CD	Box set of four radio broadcasts by Barry Bermange and Delia Derbyshire: "The Dreams"; "Amor Dei'; "The After-Life"; "The Evenings of Certain Lives"; with related and bonus material CD box set released as part of Record Store Day 20 April 2024.

== Singles ==
Year	Title	Notes
1962	"Time Beat" / "Waltz in Orbit"	Ray Cathode (a pseudonym used by Maddalena Fagandini and George Martin)
1964	"Doctor Who" / "This Can't Be Love"	Original Arrangement by Delia Derbyshire / Brenda & Johnny
1973	"Doctor Who" / "Reg"	New Arrangement by Delia Derbyshire / Paddy Kingsland
1973	"Moonbase 3" / "The World Of Dr Who"	Dick Mills
1974	"Ricochet" / "Theme Music Of BBC T.V.'s "Dial M For Murder""	Norrie Paramor And The Midland Radio Orchestra / John Baker
1976	Music From "The Changes"	Paddy Kingsland
1978	"The Astronauts" / "Magenta Court"	Peter Howell
1980	"Doctor Who" / "The Astronauts"	Peter Howell
1981	The Body in Question	Three tracks of music from the series by Peter Howell
1982	"K-9 & Company" / "Doctor Who"	Ian Levine and Fiachra Trench / Peter Howell
2017	"Proximity Edit"	A single edit taken from Everything You Can Image Is Real reworked and reassembled by Rupert Clervaux
2018	"Strange Beacons" / "Mind the Gap"	Released with issue 43 of the Electronic Sound magazine.
2019	"Doctor Who" / "Strange Lines And Distances"	Released with issue 59 of the Electronic Sound magazine.
2023	"Dalek City Corridor" / "Dalek Control Room" / "Explosion, Tardis Stops" / Inventions For Radio - "The Dreams" (Excerpt)	Released with issue 106 of the Electronic Sound magazine.
2024	"Love Without Sound" / "A Revisitation"	Radiophonic Workshop remixing tracks by White Noise. Released with issue 118 of the Electronic Sound magazine.

== See also ==
- Inventions for Radio (unreleased)
