= BBC Radiophonic Workshop – A Retrospective =

BBC Radiophonic Workshop - A Retrospective

Compilation album by BBC Radiophonic Workshop
- Released: 3 November 2008
- Recorded: 1958–1996
- Genre: Electronic music, Sound effects
- Label: The Grey Area
- Producer: Mark Ayres

BBC Radiophonic Workshop chronology
The John Baker Tapes – Volume 1: BBC Radiophonics (2008)	BBC Radiophonic Workshop - A Retrospective (2008)	Doctor Who: The Caves of Androzani (2013)

Professional ratings
Review scores
Source	Rating
The Times	3/5 stars

BBC Radiophonic Workshop – A Retrospective is a 2008 compilation of music and effects from the BBC Radiophonic Workshop. It was released to commemorate the 50th anniversary of the establishment of the workshop and includes material ranging from then to its closure. Many of the tracks were previously released on the BBC Radiophonic Workshop - 21 and The Soundhouse.

== Track listing ==
Disc 1

1. Daphne Oram - "Amphitryon 38"
2. Daphne Oram & Desmond Briscoe - "The Ocean (Main Title)"
3. Desmond Briscoe - "Quatermass and the Pit (Effects)"
4. Dick Mills - "Major Bloodnok's Stomach"
5. Desmond Briscoe & Maddalena Fagandini - "Outside"
6. Phil Young - "Science and Industry"
7. Phil Young - "The Artist Speaks"
8. Phil Young - "The Splendour That Was Rome"
9. Desmond Briscoe - "TV March"
10. Maddalena Fagandini - "Interval Signal"
11. Desmond Briscoe - "Phra The Phoenician"
12. Desmond Briscoe - "Full Circle - The Stick Up"
13. Maddalena Fagandini - "Time Beat"
14. Jenyth Worsley - "Music For A Magic Carpet"
15. Maddalena Fagandini - "Ideal Home Exhibition"
16. Delia Derbyshire - "Time On Our Hands (Titles And City)"
17. Delia Derbyshire - "Arabic Science and Industry"
18. Maddalena Fagandini - "The Chem Lab Mystery"
19. Delia Derbyshire - "Know Your Car (Get Out And Under)"
20. Delia Derbyshire - "Doctor Who"
21. Brian Hodgson - "Tardis"
22. John Baker - "Choice"
23. John Baker - "Hard Luck Hall"
24. Keith Salmon - "Westminster At Work"
25. Delia Derbyshire - "Talk Out"
26. Delia Derbyshire - "Science And Health"
27. Tony Askew - "Secrets Of The Chasm"
28. Brian Hodgson & Bridget Marrow - "The Slide (Opening)"
29. Delia Derbyshire - "A New View Of Politics"
30. David Cain - "Radio Stoke-On-Trent (1)"
31. David Cain - "Radio Stoke-On-Trent (2)"
32. John Baker - "Bobby Shaftoe"
33. John Baker - "The Lambton Worm"
34. Delia Derbyshire - "Environmental Studies"
35. Delia Derbyshire - "Chronicle"
36. Delia Derbyshire - "Great Zoos of the World"
37. John Baker - "P.M. (1970)"
38. John Baker - "Tros Y Gareg (Over The Stone)"
39. Delia Derbyshire - "Dance From 'Noah'"
40. John Baker - "Good Morning Wales"
41. Paddy Kingsland - "Sequence"
42. Dick Mills - "Martian March Past"
43. Paddy Kingsland - "The Changes (Suite)"
44. Dick Mills - "Thomas The Rhymer"
45. Peter Howell - "Merry-Go-Round"
46. Dick Mills - "Fanfare"
47. Malcolm Clarke - "BBC2 Serial"
48. Roger Limb - "The Plunderers"
49. Peter Howell - "The Secret War"
50. Roger Limb - "Quirky"
51. Paddy Kingsland - "Newton"
52. Malcolm Clarke - "Contact"
53. Roger Limb - "For Love Or Money"
54. Richard Yeoman-Clark - "Mysterioso"
55. Peter Howell - "The Astronauts"
56. Peter Howell - "Moving Form (Main Theme From The Body In Question)"
57. Paddy Kingsland - "A Whisper From Space"
58. Peter Howell - "Land And People"
59. Roger Limb - "Swirley"
60. Peter Howell - "Greenwich Chorus"
61. Malcolm Clarke - "Hurdy Gurdy"
62. Paddy Kingsland - "P.M. (1978)"
63. Paddy Kingsland - "Broken Biscuit Club"
64. Malcolm Clarke - "The Unseeing Eye"
65. Malcolm Clarke - "The Milonga"
66. Peter Howell - "Mainstream"
67. Dick Mills - "Seascape"
68. Roger Limb - "Yellow Moon"

Disc 2

1. Paddy Kingsland - "Brighton Pier" (from The Hitchhiker's Guide to the Galaxy)
2. Paddy Kingsland - "The Whale" (from The Hitchhiker's Guide to the Galaxy)
3. Elizabeth Parker - "Radio Blackburn"
4. Peter Howell - "Lascaux"
5. Malcolm Clarke - "The Comet Is Coming"
6. Dick Mills - "Macrocosm"
7. Elizabeth Parker - "Planet Earth (Scenes From The Living Planet)"
8. Dick Mills - "Catch The Wind"
9. Peter Howell & Dick Mills - "Fancy Fish" (arrangement of Camille Saint-Saëns's "Aquarium" from Le carnaval des animaux)
10. Jonathan Gibbs - "Houdin's Musical Box"
11. Jonathan Gibbs - "Computers In The Real World"
12. Malcolm Clarke - "Believe It Or Not"
13. Dick Mills - "Armagiddean War Games"
14. Jonathan Gibbs - "Dawn"
15. Roger Limb - "Ghost In The Water"
16. Peter Howell, Roger Limb, Jonathan Gibbs, Elizabeth Parker & Dick Mills - "Radiophonic Rock"
17. Jonathan Gibbs - "Woman of Paris"
18. Dick Mills - "Dandelion Countdown"
19. Jonathan Gibbs - "Heart Of The Matter"
20. Richard Attree - "Dead Entry (Opening Titles)"
21. Richard Attree - "No Easy Street"
22. Steve Marshall - "Slambash Wangs Of A Compo Gormer (Titles And Space Theme)"
23. Peter Howell - "The Great Rift"
24. Steve Marshall - "Kingdom of the Thunder Dragon (Titles)"
25. Steve Marshall - "Archery And Cranes"
26. Richard Attree - "Artwork"
27. Richard Attree - "Jewel In The Sun"
28. Richard Attree - "Techno"
29. Richard Attree - "OK2 (You In Mind)"
30. Elizabeth Parker - "Doctor To Be"
31. Elizabeth Parker - "Secret Nature (Titles)"
32. Malcolm Clarke - "The Secret Of Life (Cracking The Code)"
33. Elizabeth Parker - "Salem's Lot"
34. Elizabeth Parker - "Music from The Sea, The Sea"
35. Richard Attree - "Music From The Demon Headmaster"
36. Elizabeth Parker - "The Lost Gardens of Heligan"
37. Peter Howell - "Michael Palin's Full Circle (Main Title)"
38. Elizabeth Parker - "Assignment (Kofi Annan)"
39. Delia Derbyshire - "Dance from 'Noah' (Stereo Mix)"

== Credits ==
=== Other musicians ===
- Derek Taylor - Horn (on "The Changes (Suite)")
- Terry Emery - Percussion (on "The Changes (Suite)"), Timpani (on "The Astronauts")
- Nick Gomm - Sitar (on "The Changes (Suite)")
- Howard Tibble - Drums (on "The Astronauts")
- Ross Pople - Cello (on "Moving Form")
- Sebastian Bell - Flute (on "Moving Form" & "Lascaux")
- Geoff Downs - Drums (on "Swirley")
- Kris Rusmanis - Horn (on "The Comet Is Coming")
- Eddie Lorkin - Trombone (on "Believe It Or Not")
- Hilary Jones - Cello (on "Ghost In The Water")
- Nigel Nash - Saxophone (on "Heart Of The Matter")
- Peter Esswood - Cello (on "Doctor To Be" & "Music from The Sea, The Sea")
- Steve Bentley - Trumpet (on "Michael Palin's Full Circle (Main Theme)")
