= Music from the BBC Radiophonic Workshop =

Compilation album by BBC Radiophonic Workshop
- Released: 2003
- Recorded: 1958–1975
- Genre: Electronic music, musique concrète, library music
- Length: 91:04
- Label: Rephlex Records
- Producer: Mark Ayres

BBC Radiophonic Workshop chronology
Doctor Who at the BBC Radiophonic Workshop Volume 4: Meglos & Full Circle (2002)	Music from the BBC Radiophonic Workshop (2003)	The John Baker Tapes – Volume 1: BBC Radiophonics (2008)

Music from the BBC Radiophonic Workshop is a 2003 limited edition 4X10" vinyl compilation collecting and re-ordering the compilations BBC Radiophonic Music and The Radiophonic Workshop, including the bonus tracks from their 2002 CD re-releases. It featured the remasters provided by Mark Ayres for the original re-releases. The tracks were ordered in such a way as to provide Delia Derbyshire and John Baker with the first records dedicated solely to their work. The album was released on electronic musician Richard D. James' Rephlex Records label.

== Track listing ==
=== Record One (Delia Derbyshire) ===
==== Side A ====
1. "Mattachin"
2. "Happy Birthday"
3. "Air"
4. "Ziwzih Ziwzih OO-OO-OO"
5. "Door To Door"
6. "Pot Au Feu"
7. "Time To Go"

==== Side B ====
1. "Blue Veils and Golden Sands"
2. "The Delian Mode"
3. "Towards Tomorrow"

=== Record Two (John Baker) ===
==== Side C ====
1. "Radio Nottingham"
2. "Milky Way"
3. "The Chase"
4. "Factors"
5. "Sea Sports"
6. "Time And Tune"
7. "Festival Time"
8. "The Missing Jewel"
9. "Boys And Girls" (Traditional)
10. "The Frogs Wooing" (Traditional)
11. "New Worlds" (an extract from this song was used at the end of John Craven's Newsround)

==== Side D ====
1. "Fresh Start"
2. "Reading Your Letters"
3. "Quiz Time"
4. "P.I.G.S."
5. "Brio"
6. "Structures"
7. "Chino"
8. "Accentric"
9. "Tomorrow's World"
10. "Christmas Commercial" (an arrangement of the christmas carol "Adeste Fideles")

=== Record Three ===
==== Side E ====
1. David Cain - "Crossbeat"
2. David Cain - "Autumn And Winter"
3. David Cain - "Artbeat"
4. David Cain - "War Of The Worlds"
5. David Cain - "Radio Sheffield"
6. Richard Yeoman-Clark - "Waltz Antipathy"

==== Side F ====
1. Dick Mills - "Crazy Dazy"
2. Dick Mills - "Adagio"
3. Dick Mills - "Major Bloodnok's Stomach"
4. Paddy Kingsland - "The World Of Science"
5. Paddy Kingsland - "The Panel Beaters"
6. Roger Limb - "Kitten's Lullaby"
7. Roger Limb - "Geraldine"

=== Record Four ===
==== Side G (Malcolm Clarke) ====
1. "Bath Time"
2. "La Grande Piece De La Foire De La Rue Delaware"
3. "Romanescan Rout"

==== Side H ====
1. Glynis Jones & Malcolm Clarke - "Nénuphar"
2. Glynis Jones - "Schlum Rooli"
3. Glynis Jones - "Veils and Mirrors"
