= Out of This World (Radiophonic album) =

Studio album by BBC Radiophonic Workshop
- Released: 1976
- Genre: Electronic music, sound effects
- Length: 43:21
- Label: BBC Records
- Producer: Glynis Jones

BBC Radiophonic Workshop chronology
The Radiophonic Workshop (1975)	Out of This World (1976)	Through A Glass Darkly (1978)

Out of This World: Atmospheric Sounds and Effects from The BBC Radiophonic Workshop is a 1976 British commercial LP release of atmospheric sounds and effects from the library of the BBC Radiophonic Workshop. The album was divided into four sections (two on each side), each representing a different theme: "Outer Space", "Magic and Fantasy", "Suspense and the Supernatural" and "The Elements".

The album was produced by Glynis Jones and included sounds created by the various members of the Workshop. While many of the tracks are basic sound effects, such as those from the TV series Doctor Who, others are like ambient music, designed to create soundscapes rather than fulfilling a specific music or sound effects requirement.

The album was re-released on CD in 1991 in simulated stereo as Essential Science Fiction Sound Effects Vol. 2. It was released on vinyl LP by AudioGo and Discovery Records on 21 April 2012 as part of Record Store Day.

Track 61, "Passing clouds", by Roger Limb, was used on "Eye No", the opening song on Prince's 1988 album Lovesexy. It was also released as "Clouds", but wrongly credited to Delia Derbyshire, on a 2-CD bootleg called "Wow!", released by "Eye" Records in 2008.

The track "Spring tide" by Glynis Jones is used in the fish scene on the River Caves ride at Blackpool Pleasure Beach

== Track listing ==
=== Side 1 ===
==== Outer Space ====
1. Dick Mills - "Sea of Mercury"
2. Peter Howell - "Galactic Travel"
3. Brian Hodgson - "TARDIS take-off"
4. Brian Hodgson - "TARDIS land"
5. Dick Mills - "Space rocket take-off"
6. Dick Mills - "Space rocket land"
7. Paddy Kingsland - "Flying saucer land"
8. Paddy Kingsland - "Flying saucer take-off"
9. Richard Yeoman-Clark - "Flying saucer interior (constant run)"
10. Brian Hodgson - "Space ship control room atmosphere"
11. Brian Hodgson - "Space ship interior atmosphere"
12. Dick Mills - "Electric door open"
13. Dick Mills - "Electric door shut"
14. Brian Hodgson - "Laser gun, five bursts"
15. Brian Hodgson - "Computer"
16. Brian Hodgson - "Gravity generator"
17. Roger Limb - "Time warp start, run, stop"
18. John Baker - "Venusian space lab."
19. Malcolm Clarke - "Andromedan war machine"
20. Dick Mills - "Space-battle"

==== Magic and Fantasy ====
21. Malcolm Clarke - "Dance of fire-flies"
22. Delia Derbyshire - "Dreaming"
23. Glynis Jones - "Crystal city"
24. Dick Mills - "Enchanted forest"
25. Malcolm Clarke - "Goblins lair"
26. Glynis Jones - "Magic carpet take-off"
27. Glynis Jones - "Magic carpet flight"
28. Glynis Jones - "Magic carpet land"
29. Brian Hodgson - "Magic flower grows and buds"
30. Roger Limb - "Magic beanstalk grows"
31. Dick Mills - "Star Fairies"
32. Malcolm Clarke - "Midsummer elves"
33. Malcolm Clarke - "Fairy appears"
34. Malcolm Clarke - "Fairy disappears"
35. David Cain - "Wizard flies off"
36. Malcolm Clarke - "Casting a spell"
37. Malcolm Clarke - "Magic mushroom"
38. Glynis Jones - "Magic bird song"

=== Side 2 ===
==== Suspense and the Supernatural ====
1. Delia Derbyshire - "Phantoms of darkness"
2. Dick Mills - "Uncanny expectation"
3. David Cain - "Spectres in the wind"
4. Malcolm Clarke - "Evil rises up"
5. Malcolm Clarke - "Threatening shadow"
6. Dick Mills - "Moments of terror"
7. Malcolm Clarke - "Passing shade"
8. Glynis Jones - "Psychic fears"
9. Glynis Jones - "Two terror twangs"
10. Glynis Jones - "Three terror bangs"
11. David Cain - "Terror zing"
12. Malcolm Clarke - "Terror glissando"
13. Malcolm Clarke - "'Thing' approaches"
14. Brian Hodgson - "Roaring monster"
15. Peter Howell - "Firespitting monster"
16. Dick Mills - "Nightmare forest"
17. Dick Mills - "Fiendish shrieks"

==== The Elements ====
18. Delia Derbyshire - "Heat haze"
19. Roger Limb - "Desert sands"
20. Delia Derbyshire - "Frozen waste"
21. Delia Derbyshire - "Icy peak"
22. David Cain - "Snow swirls"
23. Roger Limb - "Passing clouds"
24. Glynis Jones - "Starry skies"
25. John Baker - "Electric storm"
26. John Baker - "Watery depths"
27. John Baker - "Rising bubbles"
28. Glynis Jones - "Spring tide"
