= BBC Radiophonic Workshop – 21 =

BBC Radiophonic Workshop - 21

Compilation album by BBC Radiophonic Workshop
- Released: 1979
- Recorded: 1958–1979
- Genres: Electronic music, Sound effects
- Length: 41:28
- Label: BBC Records

BBC Radiophonic Workshop chronology
BBC Sound Effects No. 19 - Doctor Who Sound Effects (1978)	BBC Radiophonic Workshop - 21 (1979)	BBC Sound Effects No. 26 - Sci-Fi Sound Effects (1981)

BBC Radiophonic Workshop – 21 is a compilation by the BBC Radiophonic Workshop to celebrate their 21st anniversary in 1979. It was compiled as an overview of their work both old and new, showcasing the changes in the Workshop as they developed from backroom sound effects suppliers for BBC Radio to full-fledged in-house music composers for the whole of the corporation. It demonstrates the move from the musique concrète and tape-manipulation techniques used in the early days, to the synthesiser works of the 1970s. The first side of the album consisted of material from 1958 to 1971, covering their early work creating jingles, sound-effects and some incidental music. This side includes the first material by Workshop founder Desmond Briscoe to be commercially released, as well as sound effects from The Goon Show, Maddalena Fagandini's interval signal that later became "Time Beat", some of Delia Derbyshire's experimental work and the pilot episode version of the Doctor Who theme music. The second side of the record covered the period between 1971 and 1979, including Richard Yeoman-Clark material from popular BBC series Blake's 7 and Peter Howell's vocoder heavy "Greenwich Chorus" theme for The Body in Question. It was reissued on CD by Silva Screen Records on 22 April 2016.

== Track listing ==
=== Side 1 ===
1. Desmond Briscoe - "Quatermass and the Pit"
2. Dick Mills - "Major Bloodnock's Stomach" (from The Goon Show)
3. Desmond Briscoe - "Outside"
4. Phil Young - "Science and Industry"
5. Phil Young - "The Artist Speaks"
6. Phil Young - "The Splendour That Was Rome"
7. Maddalena Fagandini - "Interval Signal"
8. Desmond Briscoe - "Phra The Phoenician"
9. Desmond Briscoe - "Stick Up"
10. Maddalena Fagandini - "Interval Signal" (reworked as "Time Beat")
11. Maddalena Fagandini - "Ideal Home Exhibition"
12. Delia Derbyshire - "Time on Our Hands"
13. Delia Derbyshire - "Arabic Science and Industry"
14. Maddalena Fagandini - "The Chem Lab Mystery"
15. Delia Derbyshire - "Know Your Car"
16. Delia Derbyshire - "Doctor Who"
17. Brian Hodgson - "TARDIS"
18. John Baker - "Choice"
19. John Baker - "Hardluck Hall"
20. Delia Derbyshire - "Talk Out"
21. Delia Derbyshire - "Science and Health"
22. Tony Askew - "Secrets of the Chasm"
23. Keith Salmon - "Westminster at Work"
24. Delia Derbyshire - "A New View of Politics"
25. Delia Derbyshire - "Environmental Studies"
26. Delia Derbyshire - "Chronicle"
27. Delia Derbyshire - "Great Zoos of the World"
28. Dudley Simpson - "Minds of Evil" (from "The Mind of Evil")

=== Side 2 ===
1. Dick Mills - "Fanfare"
2. Paddy Kingsland - "Broken Biscuit Club"
3. Roger Limb - "The Plunderers"
4. Richard Yeoman-Clark - "Mysterioso" (from Blake's 7)
5. Peter Howell - "Greenwich Chorus"
6. Malcolm Clarke - "Hurdy Gurdy"
7. Dick Mills - "Martian March Past"
8. Paddy Kingsland - "A Whisper From Space"
9. Roger Limb - "Swirley"
10. Peter Howell - "Merry Go Round"
11. Malcolm Clarke - "BBC2 Serial"
12. Roger Limb - "Quirky"
13. Paddy Kingsland - "Newton"
14. Peter Howell - "The Secret War"
15. Dick Mills - "Thomas The Rhymer"
16. Malcolm Clarke - "Contact"
17. Roger Limb - "For Love Or Money"
