= The Radiophonic Workshop =

Compilation album by BBC Radiophonic Workshop
- Released: 1975
- Genre: Electronic music
- Length: 38:20
- Label: BBC Records
- Producers: John Baker, Malcolm Clarke, Glynis Jones, Paddy Kingsland, Roger Limb, Dick Mills, Richard Yeoman-Clark

BBC Radiophonic Workshop chronology
Fourth Dimension (1973)	The Radiophonic Workshop (1975)	Out of This World (1976)

The Radiophonic Workshop is a 1975 compilation album by the BBC Radiophonic Workshop, similar in concept to the earlier BBC Radiophonic Music of 1968. The album featured a variety of work demonstrating many of the various techniques the Workshop used. Unlike its predecessor though, it was far more synthesiser oriented. The music comes from all types of sources from serious drama and documentary to the "Major Bloodnok's Stomach" sound effect from The Goon Show. As with the 1968 compilation, the album was remastered in 2002 by Mark Ayres and re-released with two bonus tracks from John Baker.

It is to be reissued as part of the Record Store Day exclusive 6-CD box set Four Albums 1968 - 1978 29 August 2020.

== Track listing ==
Original track listing

Side One

1. Malcolm Clarke (with Richard Yeoman-Clark) - "La Grande Pièce de la Foire de la Rue Delaware"
  John Baker - "Brio"
2. Dick Mills - "Adagio"
3. Roger Limb - "Geraldine"
4. Malcolm Clarke - "Bath Time"
5. Glynis Jones & Malcolm Clarke - "Nénuphar"

Side Two

1. Dick Mills - "Major Bloodnok's Stomach"
  Paddy Kingsland - "The Panel Beaters"
  Dick Mills - "Crazy Dazy"
2. Glynis Jones - "Veils and Mirrors"
3. Malcolm Clarke - "Romanescan Rout"
4. Glynis Jones - "Schlum Rooli"
5. Roger Limb - "Kitten's Lullaby"
6. Richard Yeoman-Clark - "Waltz Antipathy"
7. Paddy Kingsland - "The World of Science"

2002 track listing

1. Malcolm Clarke (with Richard Yeoman-Clark) - "La Grande Pièce de la Foire de la Rue Delaware"
2. John Baker - "Brio"
3. Dick Mills - "Adagio"
4. Roger Limb - "Geraldine"
5. Malcolm Clarke - "Bath Time"
6. Glynis Jones & Malcolm Clarke - "Nénuphar"
7. John Baker - "Accentric"
8. Dick Mills - "Major Bloodnok's Stomach"
9. Paddy Kingsland - "The Panel Beaters"
10. Dick Mills - "Crazy Dazy"
11. Glynis Jones - "Veils and Mirrors"
12. Malcolm Clarke - "Romanescan Rout"
13. Glynis Jones - "Schlum Rooli"
14. Roger Limb - "Kitten's Lullaby"
15. John Baker - "Chino"
16. Richard Yeoman-Clark - "Waltz Antipathy"
17. Paddy Kingsland - "The World of Science"

== Equipment ==
Equipment used on this compilation includes:

- Studer A80 - 8-Channel Master Recorder
- Studer B62 - ¼" Stereo tape machines
- EMS Synthi 100
- ARP Odyssey l
- EMS VCS 3
- Countryman Phaser
- Glen Sound Mixing Console
- AKG 451 Condenser Microphones
- EMT Stereo Echo Plate
