= The Stone Tape =

1972 British television ghost story

- Genre: Drama; Science fiction; Supernatural horror
- Written by: Nigel Kneale
- Directed by: Peter Sasdy
- Starring: Michael Bryant; Jane Asher; Michael Bates; Iain Cuthbertson
- Composers: Desmond Briscoe; BBC Radiophonic Workshop
- Country of origin: United Kingdom
- Original language: English

Production
- Producer: Innes Lloyd
- Camera setup: Multiple
- Running time: 90 minutes

Original release
- Network: BBC2
- Release: 25 December 1972

The Stone Tape is a 1972 British horror drama television play written by Nigel Kneale, directed by Peter Sasdy, and starring Michael Bryant, Jane Asher, Michael Bates and Iain Cuthbertson. It was broadcast on BBC Two as a Christmas ghost story in 1972. Combining aspects of science fiction and horror, the story concerns a team of scientists who move into their new research facility, a renovated Victorian mansion that has a reputation for being haunted. The team investigate the phenomenon, trying to determine if the stones of the building are acting as a recording medium for past events - the "stone tape" of the play's title. However, their investigations serve only to unleash a darker, more malevolent force.

Nigel Kneale was best known as the writer of Quatermass. Its juxtaposition of science and superstition is a frequent theme in Kneale's work; in particular, his 1952 radio play You Must Listen, about a haunted telephone line, is a notable antecedent of The Stone Tape. The play was also inspired by a visit Kneale had paid to the BBC's research and development department, which was then located in an old Victorian house in Kingswood, Surrey.

Critically acclaimed at time of broadcast, it remains regarded as one of Nigel Kneale's best and most terrifying plays. Since its broadcast, the hypothesis of residual haunting – that ghosts are recordings of past events made by the natural environment – has come to be known as the "Stone Tape Theory".

== Plot ==
Peter Brock is the selfish and petulant head of a research team for Ryan Electric Products. His team are developing a new recording medium that will give the company an edge over its Japanese competitors. They move into a new facility at Taskerlands, an old Victorian mansion renovated for their use. On arrival, they learn from estates manager Roy Collinson that the refurbishment of one of the rooms in Taskerlands remains incomplete. The builders refused to work in it because it is supposedly haunted. The room, with its stone walls, is a remnant of the original building, with foundations dating back to the Saxon era. The rest of the mansion was added over the centuries.

Curious, the researchers explore the room and hear the sounds of a woman running, followed by a gut-wrenching scream. Jill Greeley, an emotionally sensitive computer programmer, has a vision of a woman running up the stone steps in the room and falling, apparently to her death.

Enquiring about old records, Collinson finds records of a young maid who had died in the room in 1890 and that an unsuccessful exorcism had been performed on the property. Brock and Jill briefly meet with a local vicar, who is also an archivist but he fails to turn up records of the exorcism.

Brock thinks that it is not a ghost but that the stone in the room has preserved an image of the girl's death and this "stone tape" may be the new recording medium they have been seeking. Their scientific devices fail to detect any evidence of the phenomena the team experience and different team members experience different phenomena; most are able to hear sounds, Jill can also see images but another member of the team experiences no sensory input. Jill thinks that the "tape" does not produce sound or light but instead connects with the human nervous system during playback to create the sensory impression of sound and vision. Some individuals are more sensitive to this than others. She surmises that the recordings are imprinted in moments of extreme emotion, like a form of telepathy.

Excited by the possibilities presented by a recording medium that uses a person's senses as the means of recording and playback, Brock and his team move into the room. They bombard it with their technology, hoping to find the "stone tape" secret and have it play on demand. Brock is certain that the walls hold the secret but he fails to develop a predictable method of triggering anything. Under mounting pressure to succeed, Brock uses every available instrument, only to be told, by Jill, that the presence she had felt earlier was now gone, apparently meaning that the "tape" has been erased. Brock's failures are compounded when his superiors signal their lost confidence in him, requiring him to share Taskerlands with a rival research team working on a new washing machine.

Embittered, Brock no longer wants anything to do with the stone tape. He disregards Jill's insistence that there is still more to learn about the room and her mounting concerns that it is dangerous to stop their research. As Brock directs the team to resume their past projects, the vicar reappears, claiming to have found records of the unsuccessful exorcism, not in 1892 but much earlier, in 1760, before the house even stood.

Realizing that the phenomenon occurring in the room is far older than the house, Jill thinks that the stone tape can be recorded over again and again, like magnetic recording tape; the maid's death was simply the most recent and clearest recording. Independently continuing her research, Jill realizes that the maid's death was masking a much older recording, left many thousands of years ago. Brock cruelly dismisses her findings and forces Jill to take a two-month leave of absence to prevent her from continuing her research.

When Jill returns to the room one last time, a powerful, malevolent presence from the much-degraded older recording besieges her senses. Like the maid before her, she dies while frantically trying to escape it—running up the steps and falling to her death.

During an inquest, Brock tries to save face by denouncing Jill as having been mentally unstable. Afterwards, he orders that all of Jill's research be destroyed without reviewing it. The "haunted" room has been declared of historical importance by a preservation society, prohibiting development, destruction or commercial use. He makes a final visit to the room and discovers to his horror that the stone tape has made a new, crystal-clear recording: that of Jill screaming his name as she dies.

== Cast ==
- Michael Bryant: Peter
- Jane Asher: Jill
- Iain Cuthbertson: Collinson
- Michael Bates: Eddie
- Reginald Marsh: Crawshaw
- Tom Chadbon: Hargrave
- John Forgeham: Maudsley
- Philip Trewinnard: Stewart
- James Cosmo: Dow
- Neil Wilson: Sergeant
- Christopher Banks: Vicar
- Michael Graham Cox: Alan
- Hilda Fenemore: Bar Helper
- Peggy Marshall: Bar Lady

=== Notes ===
- Michael Bryant is credited as 'Peter' on-screen, and as 'Peter Brock' in Radio Times.

== Background ==
Nigel Kneale was a Manx television playwright who had first come to prominence in the 1950s thanks to his three Quatermass serials and his controversial adaptation of George Orwell's Nineteen Eighty-Four, all of which were produced by the BBC. Going freelance in the 1960s, Kneale had produced scripts for Associated Television and for Hammer Films. In the late 1960s and early 1970s, Kneale had been coaxed back to the BBC, writing such plays as The Year of the Sex Olympics, Wine of India and, for the anthology series Out of the Unknown, The Chopper, the latter two of which no longer exist.

In the middle of 1972, Christopher Morahan, who was Head of Drama at BBC2 and who had directed Kneale's 1963 play The Road and the 1965 remake of Kneale's adaptation of Nineteen Eighty-Four, approached Kneale asking him to write a play to be broadcast over the Christmas period. Accepting the commission, Kneale quickly decided that, in keeping with Christmas tradition, he would write a ghost story, but with a difference – ancient spirits would come into collision with modern science. The concept of mixing the supernatural with high technology had long been a feature of Kneale's work – most notably, his 1952 radio play You Must Listen, which concerned a telecommunications engineer who discovers that a telephone line has somehow preserved the final conversation between a woman and her lover before her suicide, was an important antecedent of The Stone Tape. No recordings of the radio play are known to exist, although a remake starring Toby Jones, Reece Shearsmith, and Caroline Catz was produced in 2023. The science and supernatural theme is also present in Kneale's Quatermass and the Pit which, in addition, shares similar elements with The Stone Tape such as an abandoned house with a reputation for hauntings; the collection of documentary evidence of the haunting (also a trademark of M. R. James, a writer much admired by Kneale) and the sensitivity of certain characters to the supernatural. In addition, the relationship between the scientists and the local villagers echoes that seen in Quatermass II.

For the research facility at "Taskerlands", Kneale was influenced by a visit he had paid to the BBC's research and development facility which was based at an old country house at Kingswood Warren in Kingswood, Surrey. Similarly, the researchers working at Kingswood Warren influenced the portrayal of the members of the Ryan research team in The Stone Tape. Kneale recalled of his visit to Kingswood Warren, "The sort of impression you got of the folk who worked there was a boyishness. They were very cheerful. It was all rather fun for them, which is a very clever way to go about doing that sort of heavy research ... They were nice chaps – and so we got some very nice chaps for the TV version".

Kneale delivered his script, initially titled Breakthrough and later renamed The Stone Tape, in September 1972. Because of its subject matter, it was felt that the play would be best handled as an instalment of Dead of Night, a supernatural anthology series produced by Innes Lloyd. In the end, The Stone Tape was broadcast as a standalone programme but production was handled by the Dead of Night team under Lloyd. Selected as director was Hungarian Peter Sasdy whose credits included adaptations of The Caves of Steel and Wuthering Heights for the BBC and Taste the Blood of Dracula and Hands of the Ripper for Hammer. Cast as Peter Brock was Michael Bryant, who had starred in the BBC's 1970 adaptation of Jean-Paul Sartre's Roads to Freedom and had a reputation for playing "bad boy" roles. Jane Asher, playing Jill Greeley, had, as a child, appeared in Hammer's The Quatermass Xperiment, the film adaptation of Kneale's BBC serial The Quatermass Experiment. Iain Cuthberston, playing Roy Collinson, was well known for his role in Budgie and would go to become the star of Sutherland's Law while Michael Bates, cast as Eddie Holmes, had appeared in Patton and would later become known for his roles in the sitcoms Last of the Summer Wine and It Ain't Half Hot Mum.

Recording of The Stone Tape began on 15 November 1972 with the exterior scenes of the house, "Taskerlands". These were shot at Horsley Towers, East Horsley in Surrey. This was once owned by Ada Lovelace, daughter of Lord Byron and sponsor of computer pioneer Charles Babbage. Production then moved to BBC Television Centre between 20 November 1972 and 22 November 1972. Not all scenes were recorded in time and a remount was required on 4 December 1972. Michael Bates was not available on this day and his lines had to be redistributed among the other cast members. Incidental music and sound effects were provided by Desmond Briscoe of the BBC Radiophonic Workshop and these proved significant in setting the mood of the play – sections were later used in a BBC educational programme on the effectiveness of incidental music.

The Stone Tape aired on 25 December 1972 on BBC2 to an audience of 2.6 million. The Evening Standard praised the play, describing it as "one of the best plays of the genre ever written. Its virtues aren't just the main spine of the story, but the way the characters shift, as in real life, the bitter comic conflict between pure and impure science". Viewers were similarly impressed: a panel questioned for an audience report praised The Stone Tape as "thoroughly entertaining" and "both gripping and spine-chilling". The play has survived in the BBC Archives as its 625 PAL colour videotape master.

The Stone Tape was one of the last plays Nigel Kneale wrote for the BBC. He had become increasingly disenchanted with the organisation, mainly as a result of the rejection of several scripts such as Cracks, a proposed Play for Today, and a fourth Quatermass serial. Moving to Independent Television, he wrote and created series such as Beasts and Kinvig and succeeded in getting his rejected Quatermass scripts produced in 1979. He died in 2006.

The script of The Stone Tape was published, along with the scripts of The Road and The Year of the Sex Olympics in 1976 by Ferret Fantasy under the title The Year of the Sex Olympics and Other TV Plays.

== Cultural significance ==
One of the first to promulgate the hypothesis of residual haunting, that ghosts may be recordings of past events made by the physical environment, was T. C. Lethbridge in books such as Ghost and Ghoul, written in 1961. Since the broadcast of the play, this hypothesis has come to be known as the "Stone Tape Theory" by parapsychological researchers.

The Stone Tape was a significant influence on John Carpenter's 1987 film Prince of Darkness in which a group of scientists investigate a mysterious cylinder discovered in the basement of a church. Besides directing the film, Carpenter wrote the screenplay under the pseudonym "Martin Quatermass", and included a reference to "Kneale University". This homage did little to impress Kneale, who wrote in The Observer, "For the record I have had nothing to do with the film and I have not seen it. It sounds pretty bad. With an homage like this, one might say, who needs insults? I can only imagine that it is a whimsical riposte for my having my name removed from a film I wrote a few years ago [a reference to Halloween III for which Kneale wrote an early draft] and which Mr Carpenter carpentered into sawdust." The play also influenced the 1982 Steven Spielberg and Tobe Hooper film Poltergeist. In the 2004 BBC7 Radio Serial "Ghost Zone", a character refers explicitly to the "Stone Tape theory" as an explanation for the way an invading alien intelligence is "replaying" scenes and figures from the past of the remote Scottish village in which the story is set. Author Marty Ross has explicitly acknowledged the influence of Kneale's work, and the Quatermass serials in particular, on his own BBC SF drama.

The Stone Tape remains well-regarded to this day. Roger Fulton, writing in The Encyclopedia of TV Science Fiction, calls it "arguably the most creepy drama ever seen on television". The writer and critic Kim Newman regards it as "one of the masterpieces of genre television, an authentic alliance of mind-stretching science fiction concepts with horror and suspense plot mechanics". Writer and member of The League of Gentlemen Jeremy Dyson feels that The Stone Tape "strikes a note that it just circumnavigates your intellect and gets you on a much deeper level [...] it just has this impact on you, rather like being in the room itself. Extraordinary piece of work." Writer Grant Morrison recalled The Stone Tape as "really creepy and very memorable. Just brilliant images. That scared the hell out of me!" Sergio Angelini, writing for the British Film Institute's Screenonline, has said that "The Stone Tape stands as perhaps his (Nigel Kneale's) finest single work in the genre." Lez Cooke, in his book British Television Drama: A History, has praised the play as "one of the most imaginative and intelligent examples of the horror genre to appear on British television, a single play to rank alongside the best of Play for Today".

The Stone Tape and other works by Kneale are analysed as part of the 2016 book 'The Weird and the Eerie' by cultural theorist Mark Fisher.

The Stone Tape and Kneale are referenced by Anthony Horowitz in his novel The Word Is Murder. In the book, he compares an old house to the one appearing in the movie, and he states how much of an inspiration Kneale has been for him.

== Radio adaptation ==
A BBC audio play was produced in 2015, adapted for radio by writer Matthew Graham and director Peter Strickland. The adaptation utilizes binaural sound design and production, and includes new music by James Cargill of Broadcast. It first aired on BBC Radio 4 as part of its Fright Night programming, and features a cameo from original television production cast member Jane Asher.

== Home video release ==
A DVD was released by the British Film Institute in 2001 with a commentary by Nigel Kneale and critic Kim Newman, sleeve notes by Kim Newman and the script of the play as well as the script of The Road. This edition is now out of print. In 2013 the DVD was re-released with new cover art by 101 Films, which also included the commentary by Kneale and Newman. It was also included in a two-disc edition with the BBC's Ghostwatch programme from 1992.

== Soundtrack release ==
The Stone Tape

Soundtrack album by Desmond Briscoe and the BBC Radiophonic Workshop
- Released: 13 April 2019
- Genre: Soundtrack
- Label: Silva Screen

BBC Radiophonic Workshop chronology
The Box of Delights (2018)	''The Stone Tape'' (2019)	Doctor Who: The Visitation (2020)

The soundtrack from this film, composed by Desmond Briscoe at the BBC Radiophonic Workshop, was released on 13 April 2019 on 10" green vinyl for Record Store Day 2019. It was reissued as a bonus disc in the Record Store Day exclusive 6-CD box set Four Albums 1968 - 1978 on 29 August 2020.

=== Track listing ===
All tracks are written by Desmond Briscoe and Glynis Jones, except where noted.

No.	Title	Length
1.	"The Stone Tape (Original Opening)"	1:59
2.	"Arrival"	2:48
3.	"Scene And Heard (Backing Track Edit)" (Paddy Kingsland)	3:22
4.	"Application For An Exorcism"	2:35
5.	"Do You Know What He's Done?"	2:04
6.	"The Others"	0:50
7.	"Accidental Death"	0:38
8.	"Help Me, Peter (Closing Title)"	1:32

== See also ==
- Archaeoacoustics
- List of ghost films
