= The Changes (TV series) =

1975 British children's sci-fi series

- Title card
- Genre: Fantasy
- Based on: The Weathermonger; Heartsease; The Devil's Children by Peter Dickinson
- Written by: Anna Home
- Directed by: John Prowse
- Starring: Victoria Williams; Keith Ashton
- Composer: Paddy Kingsland
- Country of origin: United Kingdom
- Original language: English
- No. of series: 1
- No. of episodes: 10 (list of episodes)

Production
- Producer: Anna Home
- Production location: Bristol
- Running time: 25 minutes
- Production company: BBC

Original release
- Network: BBC1
- Release: 6 January – 10 March 1975

The Changes is a British children's science fiction television serial filmed in 1974 and first broadcast in 1975 by the BBC. It was directed by John Prowse and is based on the trilogy written by Peter Dickinson: The Weathermonger (1968), Heartsease (1969), and The Devil's Children (1970) (the books were written in reverse order: the events of The Devil's Children happen first, Heartsease second, and The Weathermonger third).

== Background ==
The Changes posits a Britain where a sudden enveloping noise emanating from all machinery and technology causes the population to destroy them. The resulting upheaval displaces many people and reverts society to a pre-industrial age where there is a deep suspicion of anyone who may be harbouring machinery. Even the words for technology are taboo. The remnants of modern technology that escape destruction (such as electricity pylons) produce a physical and sometimes violent repulsion among those left in Britain.

The Changes are seen through the eyes of teenage schoolgirl Nicky Gore (Victoria Williams), and the 10-part series, originally broadcast every Monday from 6 January to 10 March 1975, traces Nicky's quest to reunite with her parents and solve the mystery.

== Regular cast ==
- Vicky Williams as Nicky Gore (all episodes)
- Keith Ashton as Jonathon (episodes 5–10)
- David Garfield as Davy Gordon (episodes 5–8)
- Rafiq Anwar as Chacha (episodes 2–5)
- Zuleika Robson as Margaret (episodes 5–8)
- Raghbir Brar as Gopal (episodes 2–5)
- Sahab Qizilbash as Grandmother (episodes 2–5)
- Marc Zuber as Kewal (episodes 2–5)
- Rebecca Mascarenhas as Ajeet (episodes 2–5)
- Jack Watson as Peter (episodes 5–8)

== Production notes ==
Despite its modest budget, The Changes had extensive location filming. This included:

- Bristol: Clifton; Hotwells; Totterdown
- Weston-super-Mare: Anchor Head
- Berkshire: Stanford Dingley; Bothampstead; Winterbourne
- Gloucestershire: Miserden; Gloucester and Sharpness Canal (incl. Splatt swing bridge, Purton Locks and the British Waterways tug Severn Active); Sapperton (Daneway Inn); Forest of Dean (Bixslade Valley and Clearwell Caves).

The theme and incidental music, composed by Paddy Kingsland, combines the sound of an EMS Synthi 100 synthesiser with a small live band (horn, sitar and percussion). Kingsland went on to score both the radio and TV adaptations of The Hitchhiker's Guide to the Galaxy and incidental music for a number of Doctor Who stories in the early 1980s.

Described by BBC continuity as "a serial for older children", the TV series was freely adapted by Anna Home from a trilogy of novels by Peter Dickinson. The series took most of its material from The Weathermonger which, together with Heartsease and The Devil's Children has recently been reissued in a single volume in the UK. In the original books, however, the lead character of Nicky Gore appears only in The Devil's Children – the books have entirely separate characters, and Nicky is introduced into scenarios in which she does not appear in the books, mixing with characters from the other two books. In addition, the timespan of The Changes is considerably reduced from that of the original trilogy.

The series was shown overseas, repeated by the BBC in 1976 and on UK Gold in 1994. It was released on DVD by the BFI in August 2014.

== Episode guide ==
Note: Episode titles were given in Radio Times, but were not shown on-screen.

No.	Title	Guest cast	Original release date
1	"The Noise"	Sonia Graham (Mrs Gore), Bernard Horsfall (Mr Gore), Clyde Pollitt (Preacher), Bartlett Mullins (Old Man)	6 January 1975
A strange noise fills people all over Britain with a violent rage against modern technology.
2	"The Bad Wires"	Bartlett Mullins (Old Man)	13 January 1975
Separated from her parents, Nicky joins a group of Sikhs.
3	"The Devil's Children"	Arthur Hewlett (Mr Tom), James Ottoway (Maxie), David King (Mr Barnard), Nancy Gabrielle (Mrs Sallow)	20 January 1975
Nicky and the Sikhs settle at Brooker's Farm but are dubbed by villagers as "the Devil's Children".
4	"Hostages!"	Arthur Hewlett (Mr Tom), James Ottoway (Maxie), David King (Mr Barnard), Edward Brayshaw (Chief Robber), Derek Ware (Second Robber)	27 January 1975
Bandits attack the village and take the children hostage.
5	"Witchcraft!"	Roy Evans (Carter), James Ottoway (Maxie), Stella Tanner (Anne)	3 February 1975
Nicky tries to track down her aunt, while the farm is visited by a witch finder.
6	"A Pile of Stones"	Stella Tanner (Anne), Tony Hughes (Jack)	10 February 1975
Nicky is found guilty of witchcraft and sentenced to death by stoning.
7	"Heartsease"	Stella Tanner (Anne), Tony Hughes (Jack), Kenneth Gilbert (Innkeeper), Daphne Neville (Villager), Godfrey Jackman (Publican)	17 February 1975
Nicky and Jonathon escape, pursued by the witch-finder and enraged villagers.
8	"Lightning!"	Kenneth Gilbert (Innkeeper), Tom Chadbon (Michael), Merelina Kendall (Mary)	24 February 1975
Nicky and Jonathon try to escape to sea but their boat is struck by lightning.
9	"The Quarry"	Tom Chadbon (Michael), Merelina Kendall (Mary), Oscar Quitak (Mr Furbelow)	3 March 1975
Nicky and Jonathon set off to investigate a mysterious power source on the other side of the mountains.
10	"The Cavern"	Oscar Quitak (Mr Furbelow)	10 March 1975
The protagonists enter a cavern and uncover the cause of the unbalancing of the world.

== Soundtrack ==
The Changes

Soundtrack album by Paddy Kingsland and the BBC Radiophonic Workshop
- Released: 21 April 2018
- Genre: Soundtrack
- Label: Silva Screen

BBC Radiophonic Workshop chronology
Everything You Can Imagine Is Real (2017)	''The Changes'' (2018)	Doctor Who The Five Doctors (2018)

A selection of music from this serial was released as a single by BBC Records (RESL 33) in 1976.

The complete soundtrack by Paddy Kingsland was released on double white vinyl LP on 21 April 2018 for Record Store Day 2018.

It was reissued as a bonus disc in the Record Store Day exclusive 6-CD box set Four Albums 1968 – 1978 29 August 2020.

=== Track listing ===
All tracks are written by Paddy Kingsland.

Episode 1: "The Noise"
No.	Title	Length
1.	"The Changes Opening Titles"	0:35
2.	"Home Alone (Nicky's Theme)"	3:05
3.	"Everybody's Gone"	2:07

Episode 2: "The Bad Wires"
No.	Title	Length
4.	"A Note on the Door"	1:14
5.	"A Special Kind of People"	3:34
6.	"Your Ways Are Not Our Ways"	1:08
7.	"The Changes Closing Titles (56" Version)"	1:01

Episode 3: "The Devil's Children"
No.	Title	Length
8.	"The Bad Wires"	0:58
9.	"The Barns"	1:36
10.	"Life on the Farm"	1:45
11.	"The Devil's Children"	2:17
12.	"The Village Court"	0:56

Episode 4: "Hostages!"
No.	Title	Length
13.	"The Forge"	1:34
14.	"Hostages!"	4:48
15.	"Rescue"	5:43
16.	"The Changes Closing Titles (67" Version)"	1:10

Episode 5: "Witchcraft"
No.	Title	Length
17.	"The End of the Rescue"	0:30
18.	"A Farewell"	0:43
19.	"A Journey, And Arrival at Henley Farm"	3:21

Episode 6: "A Pile of Stones"
No.	Title	Length
20.	"Sentence of Death"	3:07
21.	"Leaving Shipton"	3:09

Episode 7: "Heartsease"
No.	Title	Length
22.	"Heartsease"	4:09
23.	"At Purton Bridge"	1:10
24.	"The Changes Closing Titles (63" Version)"	1:07

Episode 8: "Lightning!"
No.	Title	Length
25.	"After The Bridge"	1:59
26.	"Michael And Mary"	2:09

Episode 9: "The Quarry"
No.	Title	Length
27.	"Necromancer's Weather"	3:19
28.	"The Quarry"	2:46
29.	"Mr Furbelow"	0:59
30.	"Qui Me Tangit, Turbat Mundum"	2:39
31.	"The Changes Closing Titles (48" Version)"	0:53

Episode 10: "The Cavern"
No.	Title	Length
32.	"Into The Rock"	2:59
33.	"The Cavern"	1:53
34.	"Merlinus Sum"	0:19
35.	"It's All Over"	1:40
36.	"Everything's Alright Again (End Titles)"	0:49

Bonus Tracks
No.	Title	Length
37.	"Nicky's Theme (Stereo Demo)"	1:35
38.	"Theme 2 Demo"	1:47
39.	"The Noise"	3:10

== Critical reception ==
Science fiction historian Brian Stableford lauded The Changes, writing that "Home's adaption of Dickinson's well-written novels is sensitive and artful."

Reviewing the DVD release of The Changes, writer Rob Young praised the show. Young stated "Episode one, entitled ‘The Noise’, is as good as anything the BBC children’s department ever produced." Young said The Changes had "occasionally stilted script and dialogue", but praised the performances of Victoria Williams, David Garfield and Oscar Quitak. Young concluded: "Home was committed to creating a canon of youth television to compare with the great works of children’s literature, and The Changes deserves that comparison".

Stewart Lee has remarked during an interview on the BBC4 programme Charlie Brooker's Screenwipe that he feels lucky for having been a teenager watching TV for teenagers in the 1970s as "there was something really comforting for nerds and weirdos about programmes like Children of the Stones and The Changes.".
