= Time Beat =

Single by Ray Cathode (Maddalena Fagandini & George Martin)
- B-side: "Waltz in Orbit"
- Released: 1962
- Recorded: 1962
- Genre: Electronic music
- Length: 2:09
- Label: Parlophone
- Songwriters: Maddalena Fagandini, George Martin.
- Producer: George Martin

BBC Radiophonic Workshop singles chronology
"Time Beat" (1962)	"BBC Radiophonic Music" (1968)

Audio
- "Time Beat" on YouTube

"Time Beat" is the first commercial release from the BBC Radiophonic Workshop. It was credited to "Ray Cathode", pseudonym of Maddalena Fagandini and future Beatles producer George Martin. The song was actually a reworking of an earlier interval signal created by Fagandini. The original track was later featured on the compilation BBC Radiophonic Workshop - 21. The B-side to the single was "Waltz in Orbit", also credited to Ray Cathode.

Time Beat can also be found on the fourth CD of Produced by George Martin.

== Track listing ==
- A1 - "Time Beat"
- B1 - "Waltz in Orbit"
