= Elizabeth Parker (composer) =

British film and television composer

Elizabeth Parker is a British film and television composer who worked at the BBC Radiophonic Workshop from 1978 until the workshop's closure.

== Biography ==
Parker graduated from the University of East Anglia with a degree in music, after which she completed a master's degree in electronic music. When she first started working at the BBC she was training to become a studio manager. She later joined the BBC Radiophonic Workshop.

The BBC Radiophonic Workshop became redundant in the 1990s as electronic music equipment became cheaper, and the workshop was ultimately shut down in 1998. Parker worked at the workshop "right until the very end". In the final years, the BBC could not justify the expense of upgrading the workshop's equipment, leading Parker to describe the obsolete workshop in its final days as "horrendous" and "horrible". After the workshop shut down, Parker set up her own studio and began working as a freelance composer.

== Works ==
During her time at the Radiophonic Workshop, Parker worked on hundreds of BBC productions for both television and radio. These productions included:

- The science fiction television series Blake's 7. Parker provided special sound for the series, taking over from Richard Yeoman-Clark from Series B onwards. She also provided the music for the episode "Gambit".
- The David Attenborough documentary series The Living Planet. An LP of Parker's score for the series was released in 1984.
- The science fiction television series Doctor Who. Parker provided special sound for the 1978 story The Stones of Blood, and the incidental score for the 1985 story Timelash under the name Liz Parker. Parts of this score are featured on the Doctor Who: 30 Years at the BBC Radiophonic Workshop compilation.
- The BBC Radio 4 adaptations of Iris Murdoch's novels The Bell and The Sea, the Sea.
- The BBC Radio 3 broadcast of Harold Pinter's play Moonlight.

Parker also arranged Gabriel Fauré's short work Pavane for choir, which the BBC used as their theme tune for the 1998 FIFA World Cup.

Parker continued to work on various television productions as a freelance composer. She wrote music for the BBC One documentary The Human Body and was commissioned to write new music for the soundtrack of a re-release of the comedy film Monty Python and the Holy Grail.
