= The Hobbit (radio series) =

1968 adaptation of J. R. R. Tolkien book

The Hobbit is a 1968 BBC Radio adaptation of J. R. R. Tolkien's 1937 children's fantasy novel of the same name.

The series was adapted by Michael Kilgarriff in eight episodes for BBC Radio 4 broadcast in the autumn of 1969. Music was written by David Cain. Paul Daneman played the titular role of the hobbit, Bilbo Baggins. It was produced by John Powell. The recording has been described as a classic.

== Plot ==
The radio series follows the plot of the original novel (revised 1951 version) closely, except for the addition of The Tale Bearer, a narrator whose account of the story is often interrupted and embellished by the protagonist Bilbo Baggins in the role of secondary narrator.

Bilbo is approached by the wizard Gandalf to undertake a dangerous adventure, and despite his initial reluctance he soon finds himself accompanying Thorin Oakenshield and his party of dwarves on a long and difficult quest to recover the dwarves' treasure from Smaug the dragon. On the way, he encounters trolls, goblins and giant spiders, and finds a magic ring with the power of invisibility.

== Production ==
The show's production was complicated by the inclusion of multiple sound effects (often inserted live while recording the actors' performances), songs from the novel, and special sounds and electronic voice treatments for the non-human characters created by the BBC Radiophonic Workshop.

== Reception ==
The scholar of English literature Nick Groom writes that the 1968 radio series, "deemed a 'classic'", was repeated in that year and broadcast again in 1991. He comments that the dialogue works both dramatically and in conveying the story's details. He finds the performance of Gollum (by Wolfe Morris) "impressively affective". Groom suggests that the discussion between Bilbo and Gollum "about being eaten" influenced the actor Martin Freeman's approach to the same scene in Peter Jackson's 2012 film The Hobbit: An Unexpected Journey. Groom describes the accents used in the radio series as "strangely accented", noting such pronunciations as "Gandalv" and "Gondoleen".

== Audio release ==
The original master tapes for the series were wiped in the 1970s. The BBC recovered the series from a domestic off-air tape recording.

There have been several home audio releases of the series on cassette and CD. The 1997 CD release includes a bonus CD containing 9¼ minutes of additional music in stereo, which was taken from BBC records REC 91S [LP] David Munrow and the Early Music Consort of London play music by David Cain recorded in 1971. The artwork (illustrations and map) are by J. R. R. Tolkien. The tracks include:

1. Opening and Bilbo's Theme (1:58)
2. Elves' Dances (1:38)
3. Bilbo's Lullaby (2:10)
4. Fanfare and Dance in Esgaroth (3:31)

The 1997 set contains a "Personal Memoir" by the series producer John Powell.

== Cast and credits ==
The cast and crew are as follows:

=== Main cast ===
- Anthony Jackson – The Tale Bearer
- Paul Daneman – Bilbo
- Francis de Wolff – Smaug
- John Justin – Thorin
- Heron Carvic – Gandalf
- Leonard Fenton – Elvenking
- John Pullen – Elrond
- Wolfe Morris – Gollum
- Duncan McIntyre – Bombur
- Lockwood West – Dwalin
- Peter Pratt – Balin
- Alexander John – Dori
- Peter Williams – Bard the Bowman
- Denis McCarthy – Great Goblin

=== Additional voices ===
- Peter Baldwin – Galion, Glóin
- David Brierly – Fíli
- John Bryning – Master of Laketown
- Wilfred Carter – Ori
- Nicholas Edmett – Kíli
- Greta Gouriet – Spider
- Brian Haines – Bert, Bifur, Dáin II Ironfoot
- Betty Hardy – Spider
- Denys Hawthorne – Beorn
- Hayden Jones – Elf Guard, Elves, Goblins
- Hilda Kriseman – Spider
- Rolf Lefebvre – Óin
- Victor Lucas – Bill
- Denis McCarthy – Bofur, Great Goblin
- Ian Thompson – Herald of Laketown
- Anthony Viccars – Nori
- Marjorie Westbury – Thrush
- John Wyse – Roäc

=== Crew ===
- Music composed by David Cain
- Music performed by David Munrow with The Early Music Consort
- Special sound effects and voice treatments by David Cain and Dick Mills, BBC Radiophonic Workshop
- Produced by John Powell
