= BBC Radiophonic Music =

Compilation album by BBC Radiophonic Workshop
- Released: 1968
- Recorded: 1962–1968
- Genre: Electronic music, library music
- Length: 47:29
- Label: BBC Records
- Producer: John Baker, David Cain, Delia Derbyshire

BBC Radiophonic Workshop chronology
"Time Beat" (1962)	BBC Radiophonic Music (1968)	Fourth Dimension (1973)

BBC Radiophonic Music is the first compilation of music released by the BBC Radiophonic Workshop. It featured music by three of the Workshop's most prominent composers, John Baker, David Cain, and Delia Derbyshire. The album was originally released by BBC Radio Enterprises in 1968 to coincide with the Workshop's tenth anniversary and later re-released in 1971 on the BBC Records label.

In 2002, the compilation was remastered by Mark Ayres, and re-released with two bonus Derbyshire songs; the original composition "Time to Go" and her version of "Happy Birthday". For the 2003 release of Music from the BBC Radiophonic Workshop, the 2002 remasters of this compilation were combined with Ayres' 2002 remasters of the 1975 compilation The Radiophonic Workshop, and the entire set was resequenced.

The music on BBC Radiophonic Music varied between incidental music and signature tunes, which had been used by various BBC programmes, as well as some radio jingles. The selection demonstrated many of the methods used by the composers at the Radiophonic Workshop, including musique concrète tape editing and their use of primitive early electronic oscillators. It featured mostly original compositions, except for Baker's arrangements of the traditional "Boys and Girls" and "The Frogs Wooing", and Derbyshire's version of Johann Sebastian Bach's "Air".

It was reissued on 29 August 2020 as part of the Record Store Day exclusive 6-CD box set Four Albums 1968 - 1978.

== Track listing ==
Original track no.	2002 track no.	2003 track no.	Artist	Track name	Year
1	1	E5	David Cain	"Radio Sheffield"	1967
2	2	C1	John Baker	"Radio Nottingham"	1968
3	3	C9	John Baker	"Boys and Girls"	
4	4	A1	Delia Derbyshire	"Mattachin"	
5	5	A6	Delia Derbyshire	"Pot au Feu"	
6	6	C6	John Baker	"Time and Tune"	
7	7	D9	John Baker	"Tomorrow's World"	1965
8	8	D2	John Baker	"Reading Your Letters"	
9	9	B1	Delia Derbyshire	"Blue Veils and Golden Sands"	
10	10	C8	John Baker	"The Missing Jewel"	
11	11	E3	David Cain	"Artbeat"	
12	12	D1	John Baker	"Fresh Start"	
13	13	D10	John Baker	"Christmas Commercial"	
14	14	C5	John Baker	"Sea Sports"	
15	15	B2	Delia Derbyshire	"The Delian Mode"	
–	16	A2	Delia Derbyshire	"Happy Birthday"	
16	17	C10	John Baker	"The Frogs Wooing"	
17	18	C2	John Baker	"Milky Way"	
18	19	D6	John Baker	"Structures"	
19	20	C11	John Baker	"New Worlds"	
20	21	A4	Delia Derbyshire	"Ziwzih Ziwzih OO-OO-OO"	
21	22	C7	John Baker	"Festival Time"	
22	23	C3	John Baker	"The Chase"	
23	24	B3	Delia Derbyshire	"Towards Tomorrow"	
24	25	D3	John Baker	"Quiz Time"	
25	26	D4	John Baker	"P.I.G.S."	
26	27	E2	David Cain	"Autumn and Winter"	
27	28	A5	Delia Derbyshire	"Door to Door"	
28	29	C4	John Baker	"Factors"	
29	30	E4	David Cain	"War of the Worlds"	
30	31	E1	David Cain	"Crossbeat"	
31	32	A3	Delia Derbyshire	"Air"	
–	33	A7	Delia Derbyshire	"Time to Go"	
