= Radiophonic Workshop (2014 album) =

2014 album by BBC Radiophonic Workshop

Studio album by Radiophonic Workshop
- Released: 15 December 2014
- Genre: Electronic music
- Length: 48:31
- Label: Bowers and Wilkins

Radiophonic Workshop chronology
Doctor Who: The Krotons (2013)	Radiophonic Workshop (2014)	The Vendetta Tapes (2015)

Radiophonic Workshop is a 2014 album of recordings created by the BBC Radiophonic Workshop. It was only available through the Bowers and Wilkins's Society of Sound music subscription service.

== Track listing ==
No.	Title	Length
1.	"On"	1:12
2.	"Out There"	6:40
3.	"ZiwZih ZiwZih Oo-Oo-Oo"	2:22
4.	"Incubus"	3:35
5.	"Aphorism"	2:04
6.	"Vortex"	5:08
7.	"Regeneration"	7:00
8.	"ΔV"	20:30
