= BBC Sound Effects No. 19: Doctor Who Sound Effects =

Compilation album by BBC Radiophonic Workshop
- Released: 1978
- Recorded: 1963–1978
- Genres: Electronic music, Sound effects
- Length: 33:22
- Label: BBC Records
- Producers: Dick Mills & Brian Hodgson

BBC Radiophonic Workshop chronology
Through A Glass Darkly (1978)	BBC Sound Effects No. 19: Doctor Who Sound Effects (1978)	BBC Radiophonic Workshop - 21 (1979)

Doctor Who soundtrack chronology
BBC Sound Effects No. 19 - Doctor Who Sound Effects (1978)	The Music (1983)

BBC Sound Effects No. 19: Doctor Who Sound Effects is a 1978 compilation of sound effects by the BBC Radiophonic Workshop from the BBC science fiction series Doctor Who. It was the first album in the BBC Sound Effects series to feature solely Radiophonic Workshop output and also the first commercial release of an album of the Doctor Who sound effects and atmospheres. The effects included came from throughout the show's history, covering both Brian Hodgson and Dick Mills' time recording effects for the programme. Effects that did not appear on the compilation included the TARDIS taking off and landing, sounds which are considered to be works of music by the BBC rather than mere effects. Each side of the record was re-released in the United States as a part of pair of picture disc compilations, which also included tracks from Doctor Who - The Music. It was remastered and re-released on 2 February 2012, by AudioGo. It was the first time the album had a CD release in the UK. AudioGo and Discovery Records then re-released the original vinyl LP on 21 April 2012 as part of Record Store Day.

== Track listing ==
The back of the vinyl slipcover lists many of the stories the sound effects originated from under working titles, taken from early script drafts before final broadcast titles had been decided upon. These alternate titles are listed in parentheses. Curiously, Death to the Daleks is listed both with its draft title and final broadcast title, being used for the first and second tracks respectively.

Track #	Artist	Track name	Stories used in
1	Dick Mills	"The Central Control Room in Exxilon City"	Death to the Daleks (Dr. Who and the Exillons)
2	Dick Mills	"The Dalek Control Room"	Death to the Daleks
3	Dick Mills	"Metebelis III Atmosphere"	Planet of the Spiders
4	Dick Mills	"Styre's Scouting Machine (Approach, Stop, Search, Depart)"	The Sontaran Experiment (The Destructors)
5	Dick Mills	"Dalek Hatching Tanks on Skaro"	Genesis of the Daleks
6	Dick Mills	"Zygon Spaceship Control Centre"	Terror of the Zygons (Dr. Who and the Zygons)
7	Dick Mills	"Sutekh Time Tunnel"	Pyramids of Mars (Pyramid of Mars)
8	Dick Mills	"The Interior of Xoanon"	The Face of Evil
9	Dick Mills	"The Shrine of the Sisterhood of Karn"	The Brain of Morbius (Dr. Who and the Brain of Morbius)
10	Dick Mills	"Kraal Disorientation Chamber"	The Android Invasion
11	Dick Mills	"The Mandragora Helix"	The Masque of Mandragora (The Curse of Mandragora)
12	Dick Mills	"Atomic Reactor Runs Wild"	The Hand of Fear
13	Dick Mills	"Wind-Mine Machine"	The Robots of Death
14	Dick Mills	"Distillation Chamber"	The Talons of Weng-Chiang
15	Dick Mills	"Cloning and Miniaturisation Process"	The Invisible Enemy (The Enemy Within)
16	Dick Mills	"Inside Dr. Who's Mind"	The Invisible Enemy (The Enemy Within)
17	Brian Hodgson	"TARDIS Interior (In Flight)"	various
18	Brian Hodgson	"TARDIS Interior (Stationary)"	various
19	Brian Hodgson	"TARDIS Observation Screen Operates"	various
20	Brian Hodgson	"TARDIS Door Opens"	various
21	Brian Hodgson	"Sonic Screwdriver"	various
22	Dick Mills	"Fission Gun (2 Blasts)"	The Ark in Space
23	Dick Mills	"Tesh Gun"	The Face of Evil
24	Dick Mills	"Gallifreyan Staser Gun (3 Blasts)"	The Deadly Assassin
25	Dick Mills	"Vardan Gun"	The Invasion of Time
26	Dick Mills	"Sontaran Gun (3 Blasts)"	The Invasion of Time
27	Dick Mills	"Gallifreyan Staser (3 Blasts)"	The Invasion of Time
28	Dick Mills	"Dematerializer Gun (Switch on and Fire)"	The Invasion of Time
29	Dick Mills	"Dalek Gun (3 Blasts)"	Genesis of the Daleks
30	Dick Mills	"Dragon Ray-Gun"	The Talons of Weng-Chiang

== Release history ==
Country	Release date	Label	Format	Catalogue
United Kingdom	May 1978	BBC	LP+cassette	REC/ZCM 316
Canada	1978	Total Records	LP	TRC 918
United States	1982	BBC / Gemcon	LP	BBC 22316
Spain	1983	Diapason	LP	51.0123
Spain	1990	Diapason	CD	950031
United Kingdom	2 February 2012	AudioGo	CD	ISBN 978-1-4084-7055-8
United Kingdom	2012	BBC	LP	LPBBC24819
