= Jonathan Gibbs (composer) =

British composer

Jonathan Gibbs is a British composer. Between 1983 and 1985 he worked at the BBC Radiophonic Workshop. His work at the workshop included providing the scores for the Doctor Who stories The King's Demons, Warriors of the Deep, Vengeance on Varos and The Mark of the Rani.
