= Through a Glass Darkly (album) =

Through A Glass Darkly

Studio album by Peter Howell & The Radiophonic Workshop
- Released: 1978
- Genre: Electronic music, progressive rock
- Length: 37:43
- Label: BBC Records
- Producer: Peter Howell & Mike Harding

BBC Radiophonic Workshop chronology
Out of This World (1976)	Through A Glass Darkly (1978)	BBC Sound Effects No. 19: Doctor Who Sound Effects (1978)

Through A Glass Darkly is a 1978 album by Peter Howell and the BBC Radiophonic Workshop. It featured six original instrumental compositions including "Through A Glass Darkly - A Lyrical Adventure", a 19-minute track which took up the whole of the first side of the record. Much of the music on the album leaned far more towards the prog rock of the 1970s than the previous output by the Radiophonic Workshop. The track "The Astronauts" later featured as the B-side to the 1980 single release of Howell's arrangement of the Doctor Who theme.

It was reissued as part of the Record Store Day–exclusive 6-CD box set Four Albums 1968 - 1978 29 August 2020.

== Track listing ==
All tracks are written by Peter Howell.

No.	Title	Length
1.	"Through A Glass Darkly - A Lyrical Adventure"	19:29
2.	"Caches of Gold"	4:04
3.	"Magenta Court"	4:27
4.	"Colour Rinse"	2:37
5.	"Wind in the Wires"	2:17
6.	"The Astronauts"	5:19

Bonus tracks on Four Albums box set reissue
No.	Title	Length
7.	"Moving Form" (Main theme from The Body in Question)	1:46
8.	"Greenwich Chorus" (from The Body in Question single)	2:21
9.	"Mesmer" (from The Body in Question single)	3:41
10.	"The Astronauts" (single version)	3:22
11.	"In The Kingdom of Colours (Through A Glass Darkly)" (alternative mix)	19:30

== Musicians ==
- Peter Howell – piano, synthesisers, acoustic guitar
- Terence Emery – timpani
- Howard Tibble – drums
- Brian Hussey – drums
- Tony Catchpole – electric guitar
- Des McCamley – bass guitar
