= The Living Planet: Music from the BBC TV Series =

Soundtrack album by Elizabeth Parker
- Released: 1984
- Genre: Electronic music
- Label: BBC Records
- Producer: Elizabeth Parker
- Compiler: William Grierson

BBC Radiophonic Workshop chronology
The Soundhouse (1983)	The Living Planet: Music from the BBC TV Series (1984)	Doctor Who - The Music II (1985)

The Living Planet: Music from the BBC TV Series is the soundtrack album to the television series The Living Planet. It was written and recorded by Elizabeth Parker at the BBC Radiophonic Workshop. It was reissued by Silva Screen on CD and digital download 12 August 2016 and on pearl-coloured vinyl LP on 26 August 2016.

== Track listing ==
1. The Living Planet (Theme from the series)
2. The Building of the Earth
3. The Frozen World
4. The Northern Forests
5. Jungle
6. Seas of Grass
7. The Baking Deserts
8. The Sky Above
9. Sweet Fresh Water
10. The Margins of the Land
11. Worlds Apart
12. The Open Ocean
13. New Worlds (Closing Theme from the Series)
