= Glynis Jones (composer) =

Glynis Jones is a composer, musician and member of the BBC Radiophonic Workshop. She joined the Workshop in 1973. In 1976, she produced the album Out of This World, on which some of her material appears. Her compositions also feature on the album The Radiophonic Workshop. She currently lives in West London.
