= EMS Synthi 100 =

Hybrid synthesizer

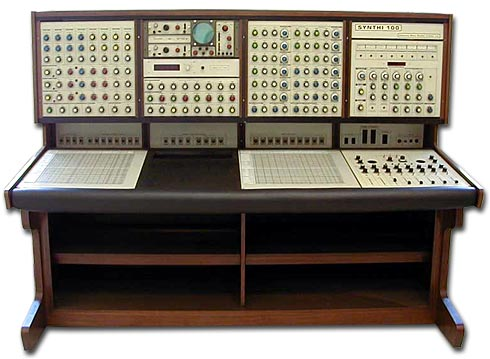
EMS Synthi 100

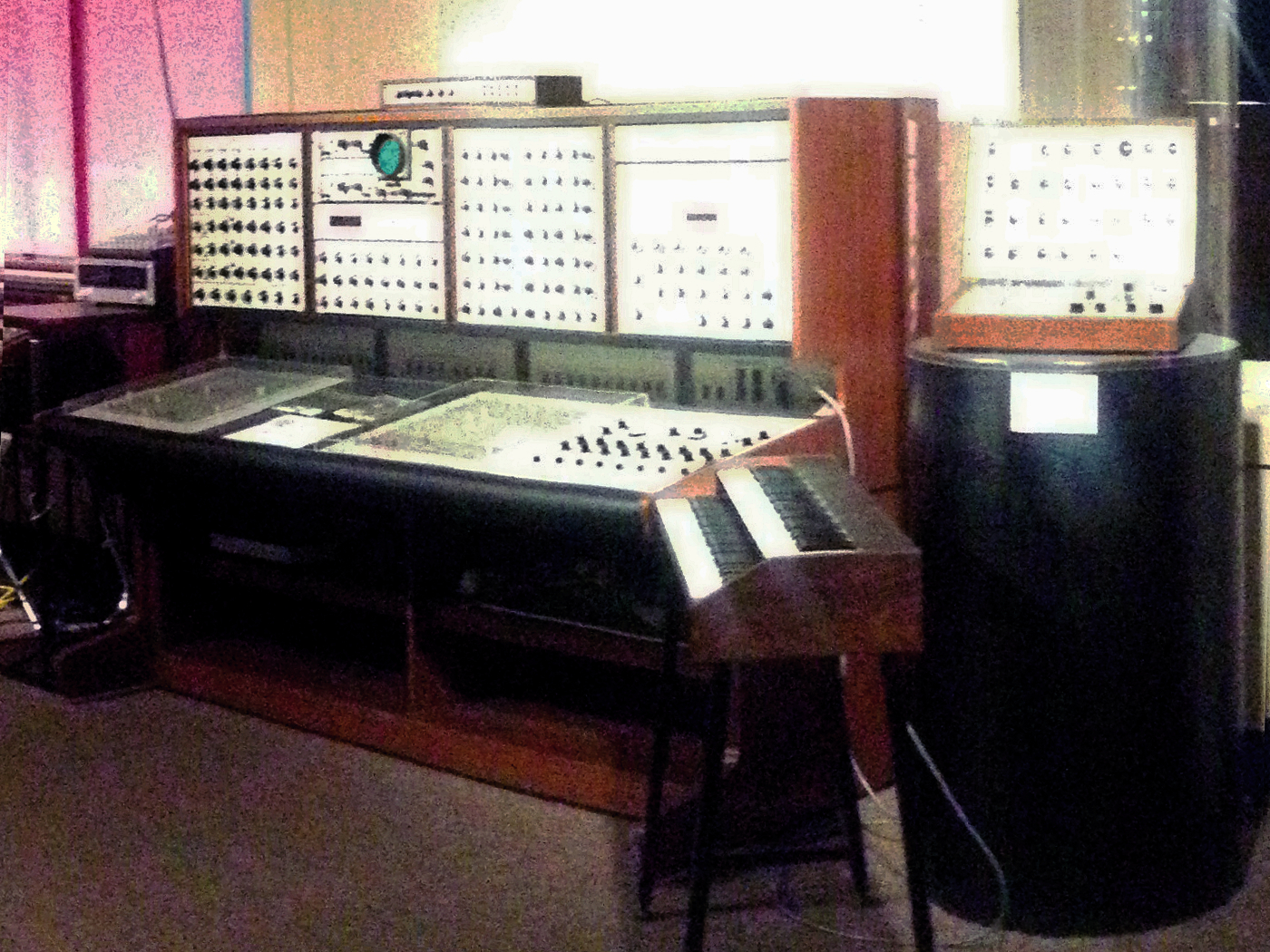
EMS Synthi 100 with dual manual keyboard (National Music Centre, Calgary, Canada)

The EMS Synthi 100 was a large analogue/digital hybrid synthesizer made by Electronic Music Studios, London, originally as a custom order from Radio Belgrade for what was to be the Radio Belgrade Electronic Studio, largely thanks to contact between composer Paul Pignon, then living in Belgrade, and Peter Zinovieff. The synthesiser was designed by David Cockerell and documented in detail in 1971. The cost at that time was £6,500 (about £92,500 in 2020 Pounds). The last unit built by EMS was number 30. Afterwards, one final unit was built by Datanomics, who bought assets from EMS when the company folded in 1979. The redesigned unit was sold to Gabinete de Música Electroacústica, Cuenca, Spain.

Developed from an initial concept of three VCS3 systems, the analogue modules on their own more closely resemble six VCS3s. With the addition of the 256-step digital sequencer's circuit cards, the card count rises to 85 (28 times larger than a VCS3 by circuit board count), with 12 voltage-controlled oscillators and eight voltage-controlled filters Two monophonic keyboards (both keyboards together produce four control voltages and two key triggers simultaneously). The digital sequencer has three (duophonic) layers, 10,000 clock events and 256 duophonic note events. Two 60 × 60 matrixes were used to connect the different modules by using patch pins. The keyboard spread could be adjusted, making it easy to play a tuned equal temperament scale as well as alternative microtonal tunings up to 61 divisions of each semitone.

The Synthi-100 was developed a few years after the first VCS3s. Both filters and oscillators were much more stable in the Synthi-100. There is an oscillator sync function that can sync the 12 main oscillators to each another or from an external source. The Synthi 100 also had an add-on computer interface known as "Computer Synthi" which contained a PDP-8 minicomputer and 4Kb of random access memory. It featured an LED display, twin digital cassettes, Two 24 × 60 matrix patchboards, and a switch button control panel. Only three were sold. The Vocoder 5000 (Studio Vocoder) was available as a separate module installed into the Synthi 100. It contained a 22 band filter, 22 × 22 matrix patchboard, mic/line inputs, two oscillators and noise sources, frequency shifter, pitch to voltage extractor, and a spectrum display driver.

== Users ==
The Synthi 100 owned by Jack Dangers can be heard being used extensively on electronica group Meat Beat Manifesto's album R.U.O.K.?. Many photos from that album's CD sleeve are close-up photos of the Synthi 100's control panels and displays.

A Synthi 100 (formally from Melodia Radio) is on display at the National Music Centre in Calgary, Canada. Until recently The Music Department of the University of Saskatchewan, in Saskatoon, Canada, also possessed a Synthi 100.

The BBC Radiophonic Workshop already had an informal relationship with EMS which went back as far as 1964 and were familiar with products being developed. They took delivery of an EMS Synthi 100 modular system in 1970 which had been modified to BBC specifications, dubbing it the "Delaware", after the name of the road outside the studio. Their composer Malcolm Clarke was one of its most enthusiastic users. One of the more notable scores he produced with the Synthi 100 was the incidental music for the 1972 Doctor Who serial The Sea Devils.

The first classical electronic music LP album generated exclusively on the Synthi 100 was released by Composers Recordings, Inc. in 1975. Called "American Contemporary-Electronic Music" (CRI SD 335), it featured full LP side lengths of music from Barton McLean (Spirals) and Priscilla McLean (Dance of Dawn).

The WDR Electronic Music Studio ordered a Synthi 100 in 1973, and it was delivered the next year It was used by Karlheinz Stockhausen in Sirius (1975–77), by Rolf Gehlhaar for Fünf deutsche Tänze (1975), by John McGuire for Pulse Music III (1978), and by York Höller for Mythos for 13 instruments, percussion, and electronic sounds (1979–80).

The first one to be used in the USA was purchased by Stevie Wonder. Billy Corgan, longtime frontman of the Smashing Pumpkins, is also reported to own one.

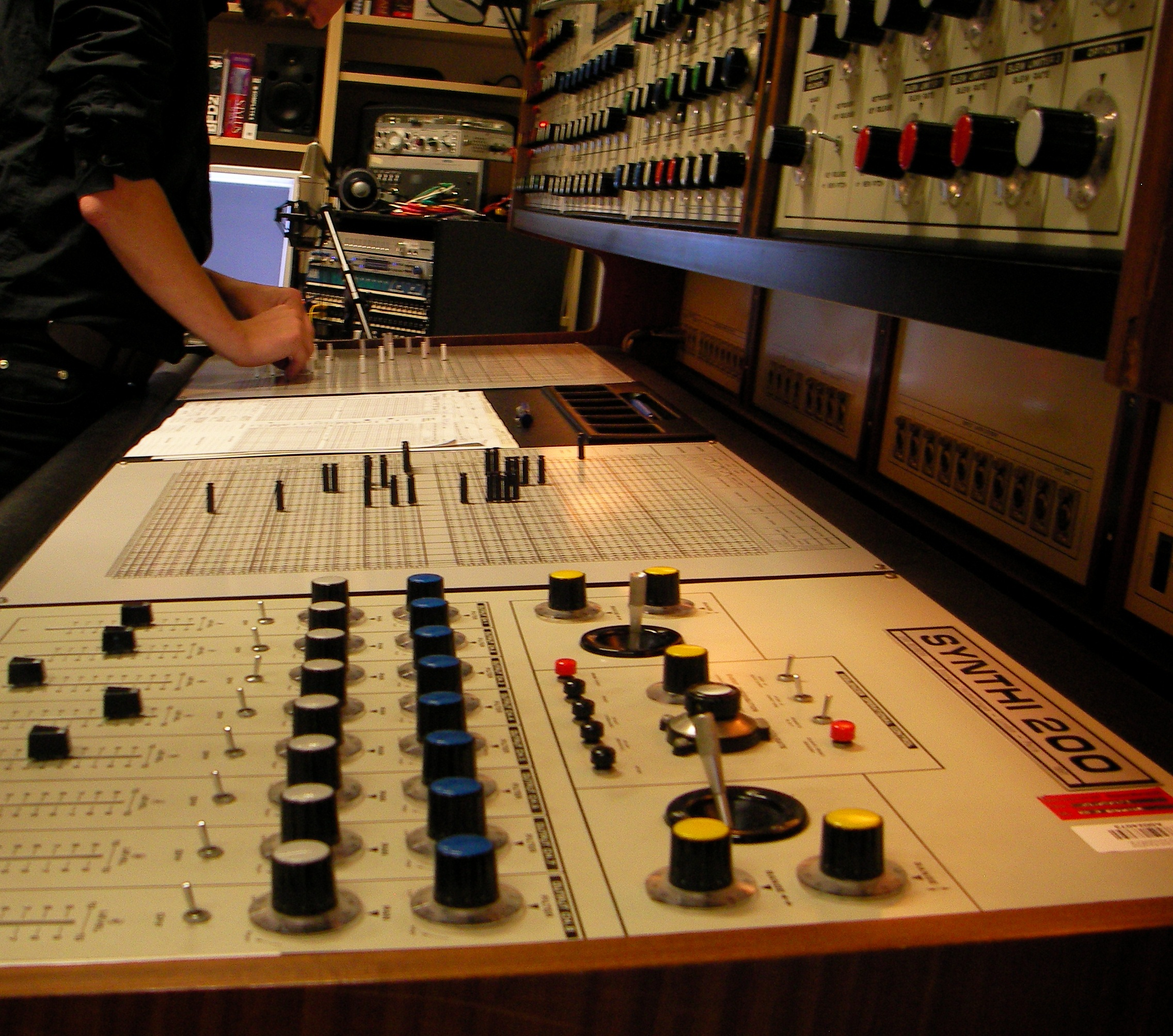
EMS Synthi 200

The University of Osnabrück, Germany, has a Synthi 100 variant labelled "Synthi 200" (since 1981). The same variant was bought in 1973 by the Bulgarian National Radio for the electronic music studio of Simo Lazarov.

IPEM, the musicology research center and former electroacoustic music production studio of Ghent University also owns a restored and working Synthi 100. It was acquired in the mid 1970s. Recently it was used by Soulwax, a belgian electronic music band, on the album "DEEWEE sessions, Vol. 01".

In 2017, Yoshio Machida and Constantin Papageorgiadis released an album "Music from the SYNTHI 100". This album was made with IPEM's SYNTHI 100.

Eduard Artemyev, Yuri Bogdanov and Vladimir Martynov used the Synthi 100 owned by Soviet label "Melodia" for their record "Metamorphoses - Electronic interpretations of classic and modern musical works". Also Lithuanian composer Giedrius Kuprevičius for their rock-oratorio "Labour and Bread" (1978) and Estonian composer Sven Grünberg for the soundtrack of Hukkunud Alpinisti hotell (Dead Mountaineer's Hotel) (1979) as mentioned in the title sequence of the movie.

Wolfgang Dauner has extensively used a Synthi 100, e.g., on his Album Changes (1978).

Sarah Davachi released her album "Vergers" in November 2016 by Important Records centred largely on the EMS Synthi 100 synthesizer.

A Synthi 100, owned by the Greek Contemporary Music Research Center, was restored and exhibited in Athens Conservatoire as part of the Documenta 14 in 2017.

According to official documents from Radio Belgrade and interview with Cockerell Synthi 100 was built as a commission by Radio Belgrade. It has been part of Radio Belgrade's Electronic Studio since the 1970s, but was in a non-functional state for the 15 years leading up to October 4, 2017, when it was restored. It is serial number 4.

The University of Melbourne's Synthi 100 has been regularly used in performances and demonstrations since it was restored by Tonmeister Les Craythorn.

The Musikhochschule Stuttgart has had a late Synthi 100 since new. It has been in constant teaching use from arrival in 1977 to the present day.

In September 2016, Engineers Australia awarded an Engineering Heritage Marker to a Synthi 100 that had been restored at Melbourne University.

Synthi-100 Nr. 7 was delivered to Bruno Spoerri in Zürich, Switzerland in August 1971. It was featured in the album "Switched-on Switzerland" (CBS 1974), "Voice of Taurus" (1976) and later on the album "Toy Planet" by Bruno Spoerri and Irmin Schmidt, also in numerous TV and film features. The Synthi was given to Felix Visser in 1987 - he had to sell it and it is unknown, where it is now.
