= BBC Radiophonic Workshop =

Produced sound effects and programme scores from 1958-1998

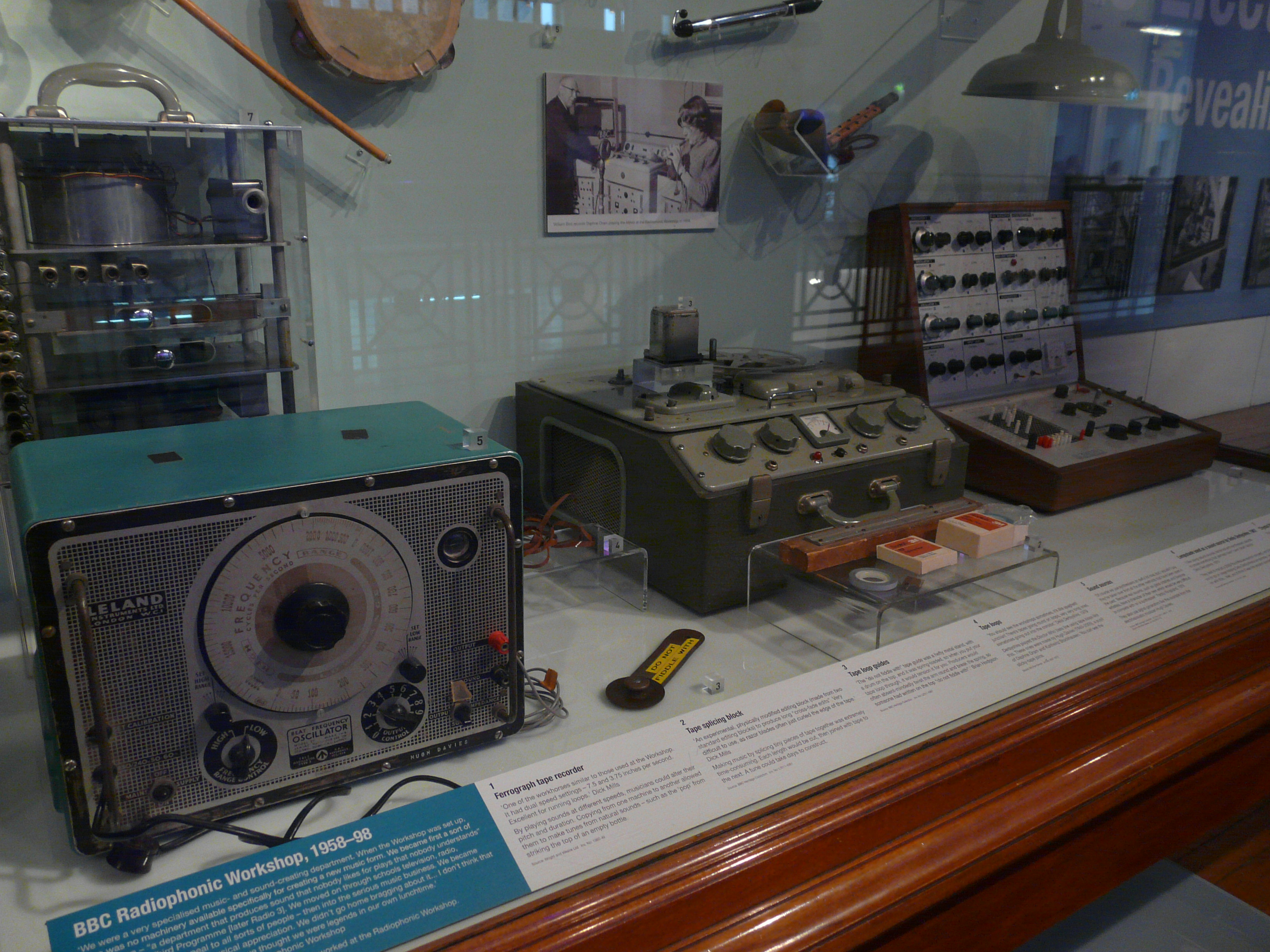
A collection of equipment from the Radiophonic Workshop, on display at the Science Museum, London

The BBC Radiophonic Workshop was one of the sound effects units of the BBC, created in 1958 to produce incidental sounds and new music for radio and, later, television. The unit is known for its experimental and pioneering work in electronic music and music technology, as well as its popular scores for programmes such as Doctor Who and Quatermass and the Pit during the 1950s and 1960s.

The original Radiophonic Workshop was based in the BBC's Maida Vale Studios in Delaware Road, Maida Vale, London. The Workshop was closed in March 1998, although much of its traditional work had already been outsourced by 1995. Its members included Daphne Oram, Delia Derbyshire, David Cain, John Baker, Paddy Kingsland, Glynis Jones, Maddalena Fagandini, Richard Yeoman-Clark and Elizabeth Parker, the last to leave.

== History ==
The Workshop was set up to satisfy the growing demand in the late 1950s for "radiophonic" sounds from a group of producers and studio managers at the BBC, including Desmond Briscoe, Daphne Oram, Donald McWhinnie, and Frederick Bradnum. For some time there had been much interest in producing innovative music and sounds to go with the pioneering programming of the era, in particular the dramatic output of the BBC Third Programme. Often the sounds required for the atmosphere that programme makers wished to create were unavailable or non-existent through traditional sources and so some, such as the musically trained Oram, would look to new techniques to produce effects and music for their pieces. Much of this interest drew them to musique concrète and tape manipulation techniques, since using these methods could allow them to create soundscapes suitable for the growing range of unconventional programming. When the BBC noticed the rising popularity of this method they established a Radiophonic Effects Committee, setting up the Workshop in rooms 13 & 14 of the BBC's Maida Vale studios with a budget of £2,000. The Workshop contributed articles on their findings to magazines, leading to some of their techniques being borrowed by sixties producers and engineers such as Eddie Kramer.

=== Early days ===
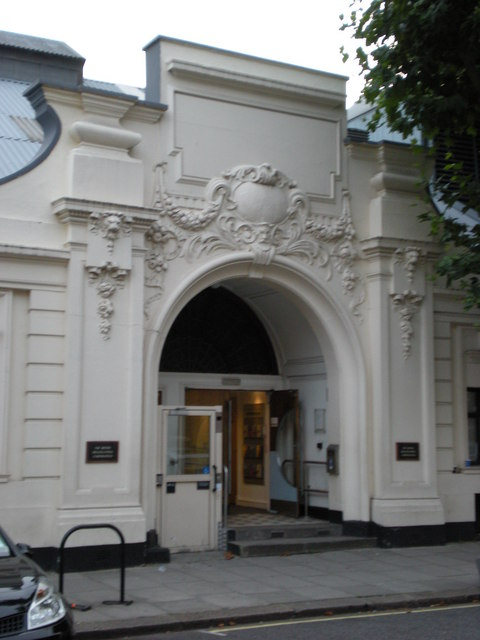
Maida Vale Studios

In 1957, Daphne Oram set up the Radiophonic Workshop with Desmond Briscoe, who was appointed the Senior Studio Manager with Dick Mills employed as a technical assistant. Much of The Radiophonic Workshop's early work was in effects for radio, in particular experimental drama and "radiophonic poems". Their significant early output included creating effects for the popular science-fiction serial Quatermass and the Pit and memorable comedy sounds for The Goon Show. In 1959, Daphne Oram left the workshop to set up her own studio, the Oramics Studios for Electronic Composition, where she eventually developed her "Oramics" technique of electronic sound creation. That year Maddalena Fagandini joined the workshop from the BBC's Italian Service.

From the early sixties the Workshop began creating television theme tunes and jingles, particularly for low-budget schools programmes. The shift from the experimental nature of the late '50s dramas to theme tunes was noticeable enough for one radio presenter to have to remind listeners that the purpose of the Workshop was not pop music. In fact, in 1962 one of Fagandini's interval signals "Time Beat" was reworked with assistance from George Martin (in his pre-Beatles days) and commercially released as a single using the pseudonym Ray Cathode. During this early period the innovative electronic approaches to music in the Workshop attracted some significant young talent including Delia Derbyshire, Brian Hodgson and John Baker, who was a jazz pianist with an interest in reverse tape effects. Later, in 1967, they were joined by David Cain, a jazz bass player and mathematician.

In these early days, one criticism the Workshop attracted was its policy of not allowing musicians from outside the BBC to use its equipment, which was some of the most advanced in the country at that time not only because of its nature, but also because of the unique combinations and workflows which the Workshop afforded its composers. In later years this would become less important as more electronic equipment became readily available to a wider audience.

=== Doctor Who ===
In 1963 they were approached by composer Ron Grainer to record a theme tune for the upcoming BBC television series Doctor Who. Presented with the task of "realising" Grainer's score, complete with its descriptions of "sweeps", "swoops", "wind clouds" and "wind bubbles", Delia Derbyshire created a piece of electronic music which has become one of television's most recognisable themes. Over the next quarter-century the Workshop contributed greatly to the programme providing its vast range of unusual sound-effects, from the TARDIS dematerialisation to the Sonic screwdriver, as well as much of the programme's distinctive electronic incidental music, including every score from 1980 to 1985.

In 2018 Matthew Herbert, creative director of The New Radiophonic Workshop, composed the sting used alongside the reveal of the new Doctor Who logo debuting later that year.

=== Changes ===
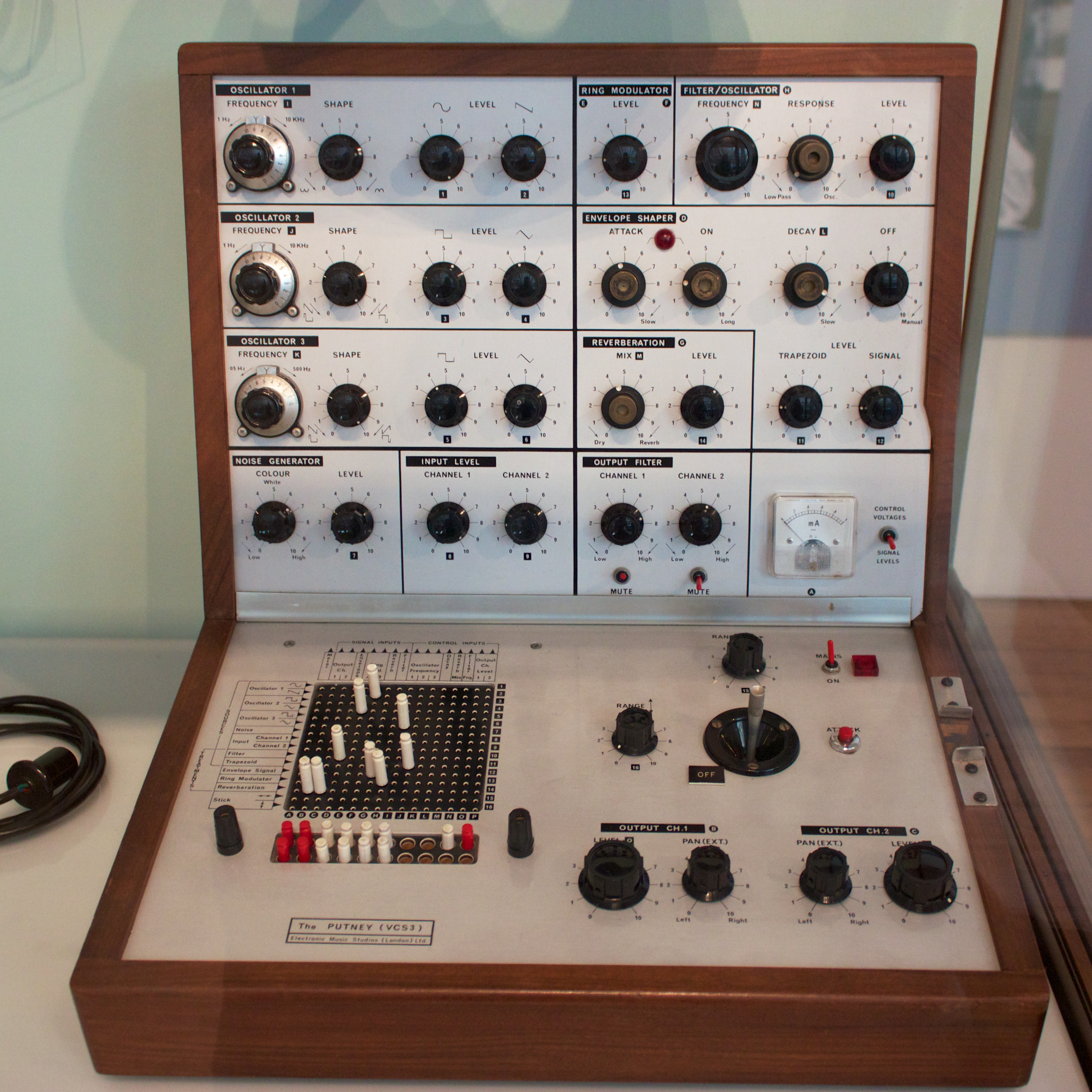
EMS VCS 3 (Putney)

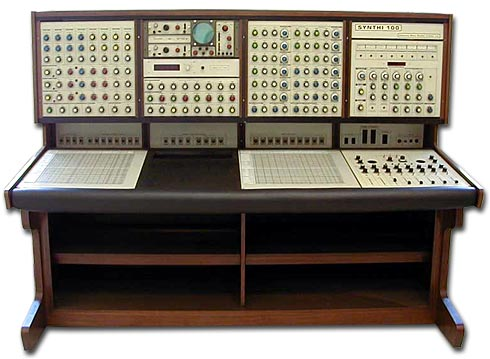
EMS Synthi 100 (Delaware)

As the sixties drew to a close, many of the techniques used by the Workshop changed as more electronic music began to be produced by synthesisers. Many of the old members of the Workshop were reluctant to use the new instruments, often because of the limitations and unreliable nature of many of the early synthesisers but also, for some, because of a dislike of the sounds they created. This led to many leaving the workshop, making way for a new generation of musicians in the early 1970s including Malcolm Clarke, Paddy Kingsland, Roger Limb and Peter Howell. From the early days of a studio full of tape reels and electronic oscillators, the Workshop now found itself in possession of various synthesisers including the EMS VCS 3 and the EMS Synthi 100, nicknamed the "Delaware" by the members of the Workshop.

In 1977, Workshop co-founder Desmond Briscoe retired from organisational duties with Brian Hodgson, returning after a five-year gap away from the Workshop, taking over.

By this point the output of the Workshop was vast with high demand for complete scores for programmes as well as the themes and sound effects for which it had made its name. By the end of the decade the workshop was contributing to over 300 programmes a year from all departments of the BBC and had long since expanded from its early two-room setup. Its contributions included material for programmes such as The Body in Question, Blue Peter and Tomorrow's World as well as sound effects for popular science fiction programmes Blake's 7 and The Hitchhiker's Guide to the Galaxy (in both its radio and television forms) by Richard Yeoman-Clark and Paddy Kingsland respectively.

BBC Radiophonic Workshop, "SoundHouse", Whale Theme excerpt
An excerpt from Whale Theme from the Hitchhikers Guide to the Galaxy TV series (music only), BBC Radiophonic Workshop

=== Latter days ===
By the early 1990s, BBC Director General John Birt decided that departments were to charge each other and bid against each other for services and to close those that couldn't make enough revenue to cover their costs. This policy led to operational staff being made redundant and more accountants being employed, and increased site costs. In 1991 the Workshop was given five years in which to break even but the cost of keeping the department, which required two dedicated engineers, a software developer (Tony Morton) and a secretary (Maxine) as well as the composers, proved too much, so they failed. Dick Mills, who had worked on Doctor Who since the beginning, left in 1993, along with Ray White, Senior Engineer, and his assistant, Ray Riley, with the Maida Vale technical team taking on their role, with engineer Fiona Sleigh smoothing the transition.

In 1995, despite being asked to continue, organiser Brian Hodgson left the Workshop, and his role was carried out remotely from Broadcasting House by people with other priorities and little enthusiasm for the workshop, rarely even visiting the site. Malcolm Clarke and Roger Limb left. By the end, only one composer, Elizabeth Parker, remained. The Workshop officially closed in March 1998, but Elizabeth stayed on for a couple of months to complete her last job. John Hunt (who had been doing much of the specialist editing side of the workshop previously done by Dick Mills) continued working in Studio E, now called "Radiophonics" until well into 2000, occasionally fitting in a bit of traditional Radiophonics work too. Mark Ayres recalls the Workshop's tape archive being collected on 1 April, exactly 40 years after the department had opened.

=== Legacy ===
Following the decision to close the Radiophonic Workshop, the studios were cleared and most remaining equipment was disposed of, with some of it being sold to the composers. The tape library was largely forgotten until the room was ordered to be "cleared" to save costs. The Maida Vale studio assistants and technical team became aware of this and hid the tapes in various dark corners of the building before they could be thrown away. Eventually Mark Ayres and Brian Hodgson were commissioned to catalogue its extensive library of recordings with help from other composers.

In October 2003, Alchemists of Sound, an hour-long television documentary about the Radiophonic Workshop, was broadcast on BBC Four.

The Magnetic Fields titled the first track of their album Holiday after the BBC Radiophonic Workshop.

In February 2025, Spitfire Audio released a sample library featuring sounds from the Radiophonic Workshop for public purchase. The library featured audio sourced from the original Workshop archives, as well as newly recorded performances by the Workshop members. Archivist Mark Ayres noted the team's age as a motivating factor for this collaboration, stating, "We're not going to be around for ever. It was really important to leave a creative tool, inspired by our work, for other people to use going forward."

=== Live reunions since 2009 ===
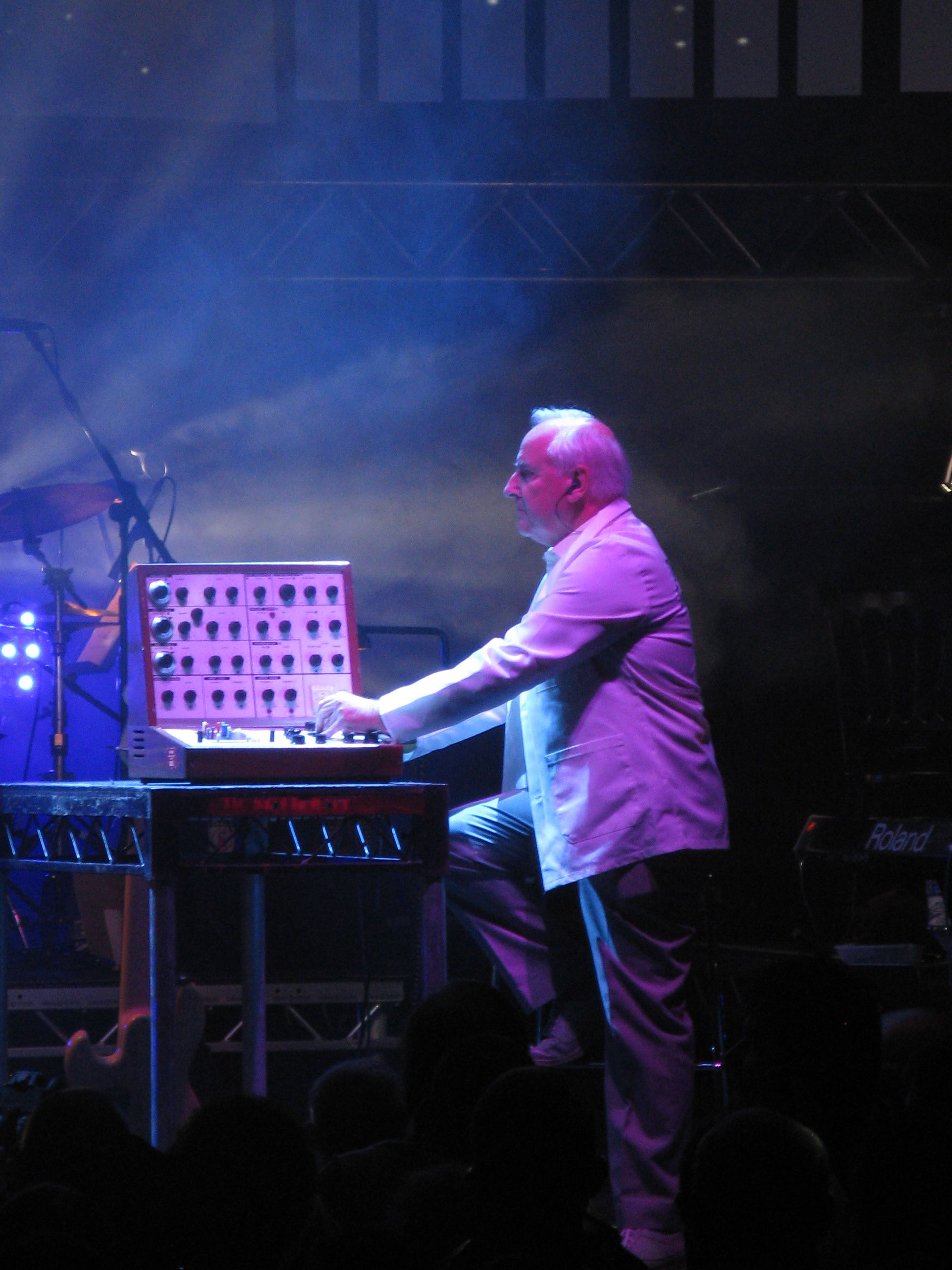
Dick Mills, BBC Radiophonic Workshop reunion live at the Roundhouse in 2009.

In May 2009, Dick Mills reunited with former BBC Radiophonic Workshop composers Roger Limb, Paddy Kingsland and Peter Howell and was joined by archivist Mark Ayres for a live concert at The Roundhouse, Chalk Farm, London, performing as "The Radiophonic Workshop". The composers, backed by a small brass section and a live drummer, performed a large number of their BBC-commissioned musical works including sections of incidental music from The Hitchhikers' Guide to the Galaxy and Doctor Who (including a medley of Mark Ayres's work) as well as some collaborative compositions written specifically for the Roundhouse concert.

The live performances were mixed in surround sound and interspersed with musical video montage tributes of deceased members of the Workshop including Daphne Oram, Delia Derbyshire and John Baker. The two and a half-hour event climaxed with live performances of the Derbyshire and Peter Howell arrangements of Doctor Who, segueing into a new Radiophonic version of the theme tune. Celebrated attendees included actor/writer/composer Peter Serafinowicz and satirist/writer/broadcaster Victor Lewis-Smith. Multiple cameras recorded the event but it has yet to be broadcast or released in any form, although amateur footage of the event can be seen on YouTube.

In 2013 the original members of the Workshop regrouped again for a more concerted programme of live appearances. Performing as The Radiophonic Workshop (dropping the BBC prefix) they were joined by drummer Kieron Pepper (The Prodigy, Dead Kids, OutPatient) and Bob Earland from Clor. They also embarked on a new recording project set for release in Autumn of 2014. This involved collaborations with contemporary electronic musicians, video artists, DJs, remixers, poets, writers and singers. Live appearances in 2013 included Festival Number 6 at Portmeirion, Wales in September and The London Electronic Arts Festival in November. The shows featured archive TV and visuals from many of the TV and film soundtracks that the Radiophonic Workshop contributed to between 1958 and 1998 when the unit was deactivated. The Radiophonic Workshop appeared on BBC television's The One Show on 20 November 2013 playing a unique version of the Doctor Who theme that combined Delia Derbyshire's original source tapes and Peter Howell's 1980 realisation of the Ron Grainer composition. Radio 6 Music's Marc Riley played host to a Radiophonic Workshop session where they delivered live versions of Roger Limb's Incubus, Paddy Kingsland's Vespucci, the Doctor Who Medley and a new composition – Electricity Language and Me (by American poet Peter Adam Salomon), featuring DJ Andrew Weatherall as the narrative voice for this classic piece of Radiophonic sound design. There were a number of radio, online and print interviews done at the time to coincide with the 50th anniversary of Doctor Who.

The Workshop's early archive recordings were also reissued on vinyl in November 2013 to accompany this renewed activity. In 2014, "The Radiophonic Workshop" appeared at festivals including End of the Road Festival, and the reissue programme of earlier work from their extensive catalogue continues along with a planned exploration of previously unheard or rare archive recordings.

=== 2012 online revival ===
In September 2012 Arts Council England and the BBC announced a joint venture whereby the concept of the Radiophonic Workshop would be revived as an online venture, with seven new, non-original composers and musicians. The new Workshop was based online at The Space, a joint venture between the BBC and Arts Council England. Composer Matthew Herbert was appointed the new Creative Director, and worked alongside Micachu, Yann Seznec, Max de Wardener, Patrick Bergel, James Mather, theatre director Lyndsey Turner and broadcast technologist Tony Churnside.

Composer Matthew Herbert's first work for The New Radiophonic Workshop takes audio from 25 previous projects featured on the website – from theater performances to poetry readings, creating a "curious murmur of activity". It can be heard by clicking on a button labeled "listen to The Space" at the top of any page on the website.

The New Radiophonic Workshop, not to be confused with the reactivated Radiophonic Workshop whose members are original BBC personnel, an entirely separate entity from the original unit, was assembled by Mathew Herbert as an online collective of composers for The Space arts project.

== Techniques ==
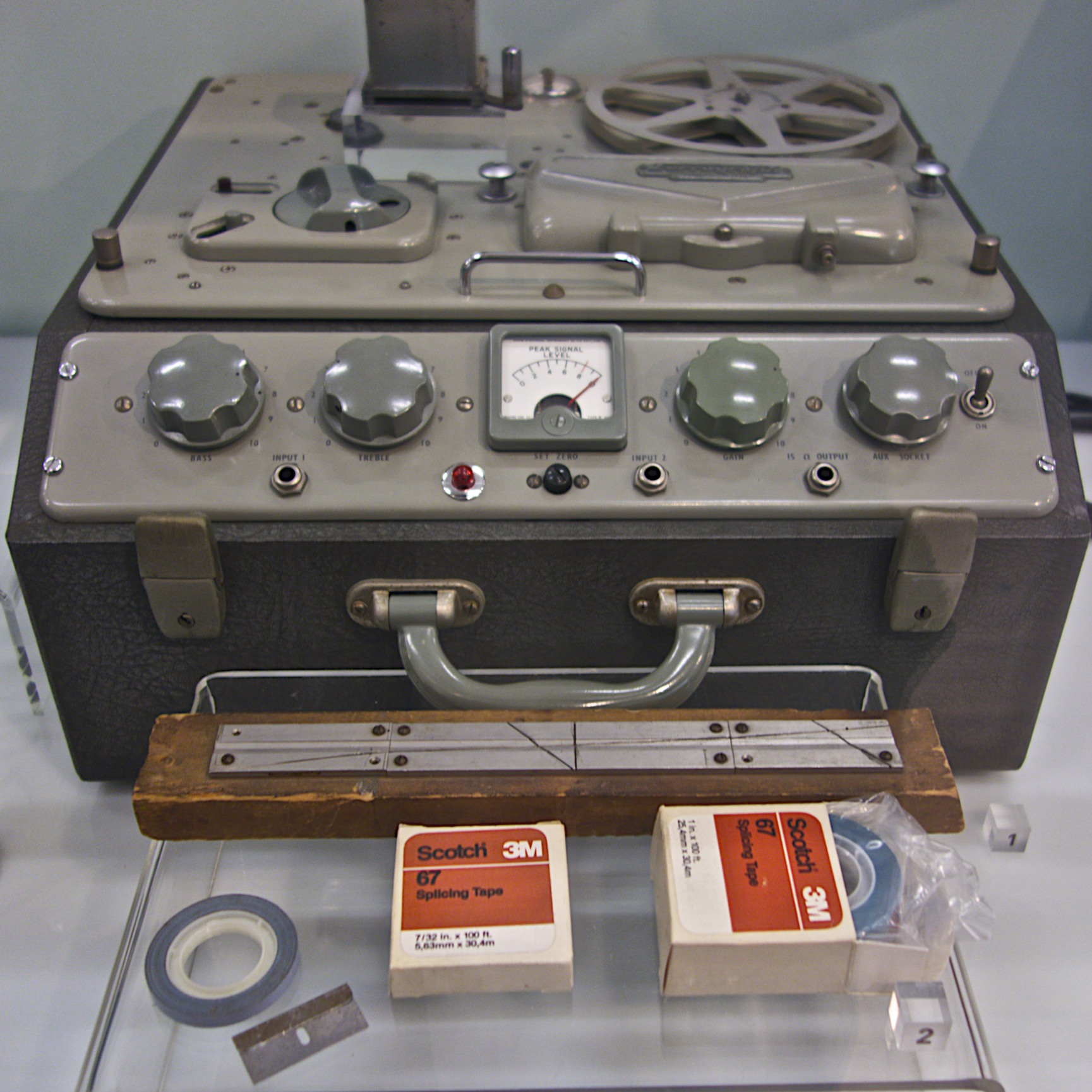
Tape manipulation tools:
tape recorder, tape splicer, and mending tapes

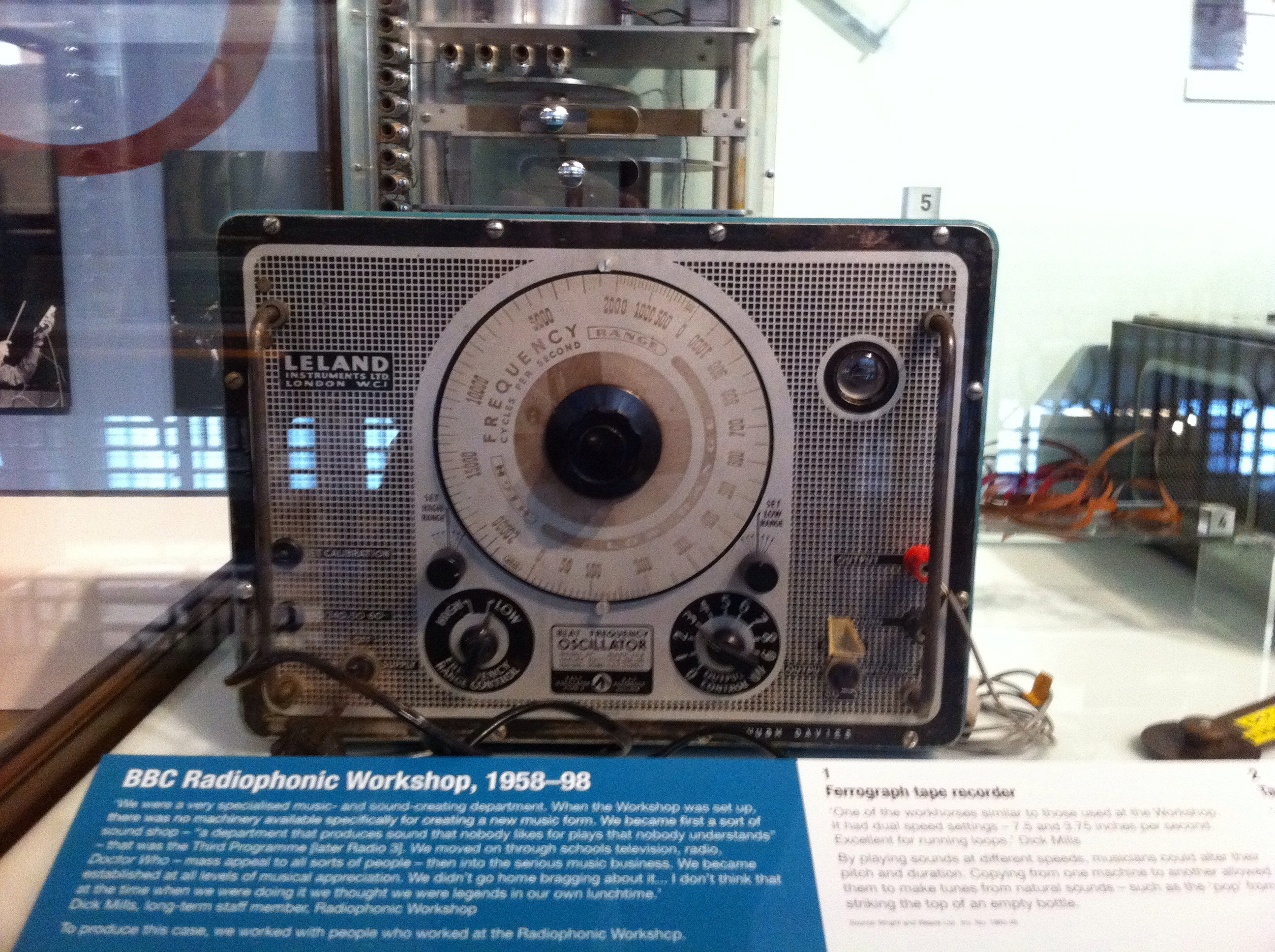
Sine wave oscillator

The techniques initially used by the Radiophonic Workshop were closely related to those used in musique concrète; new sounds for programmes were created by using recordings of everyday sounds such as voices, bells or gravel as raw material for "radiophonic" manipulations. In these manipulations, audio tape could be played back at different speeds (altering a sound's pitch), reversed, cut and joined, or processed using reverb or equalisation. The most famous of the Workshop's creations using 'radiophonic' techniques include the Doctor Who theme music, which Delia Derbyshire created using a plucked string, 12 oscillators and a lot of tape manipulation; and the sound of the TARDIS (the Doctor's time machine) materialising and dematerialising, which was created by Brian Hodgson running his keys along the rusty bass strings of a broken piano, with the recording slowed down to make an even lower sound.

Much of the equipment used by the Workshop in the earlier years of its operation in the late 1950s was semi-professional and was passed down from other departments, though two giant professional tape recorders made an early centrepiece. Reverberation was obtained using an echo chamber, a basement room with bare painted walls empty except for loudspeakers and microphones. Due to the considerable technical challenges faced by the Workshop and BBC traditions, staff initially worked in pairs with one person assigned to the technical aspects of the work and the other to the artistic direction.

== Influence on popular music ==
The Radiophonic Workshop published "Radiophonics in the BBC" in November 1963, listing all equipment used in their two workshops, diagrams of several systems, and a number of anecdotes. The Radiophonic Workshop also contributed articles to magazines of its experiments, complete with instructions and wiring diagrams.

British psychedelic rock group Pink Floyd made a memorable trip to the workshop in 1967. They had employed tape loops, sound effects, found sounds and the principles of musique concrete on their debut album, The Piper at the Gates of Dawn, from that same year. Other fans of the Radiophonic Workshop included The Rolling Stones' Brian Jones – who visited in 1968 – and Roger Mayer, who supplied guitar pedals to Jeff Beck, Jimmy Page and Jimi Hendrix. Phil Manzanera has also cited the Workshop as an influence on the sound of his group Roxy Music.

In 1997 the electronic dance music magazine Mixmag described the Workshop as "the unsung heroes of British electronica". Their work has been sampled extensively by contemporary electronic artists.

== Members of the Radiophonic Workshop ==
=== 1958–1998 ===
- Desmond Briscoe (1958–1983)
- Daphne Oram (1958–1959)
- Dick Mills (1958–1993)
- Maddalena Fagandini (1959–1966)
- Brian Hodgson (1962–1972), Organiser (1977–1995)
- Delia Derbyshire (1962–1973)
- John Baker (1963–1974)
- David Cain (1967–1973)
- Malcolm Clarke (1969–1995)
- Paddy Kingsland (1970–1981)
- Richard Yeoman-Clark (1970–1978)
- Roger Limb (1972–1995)
- Glynis Jones (1973–1978?)
- Peter Howell (1974–1997)
- Elizabeth Parker (1978–1998)
- Jonathan Gibbs (1983–1986)
- Richard Attree (1987–1998)

=== 2009–present ===
- Peter Howell (2009–present)
- Roger Limb (2009–present)
- Dick Mills (2009–present)
- Paddy Kingsland (2009–present)
- Mark Ayres (2009–present)
- Kieron Pepper (2013–present)
- Bob Earland (2013–present)

== Discography ==
=== Main albums ===
- BBC Radiophonic Music
- Fourth Dimension
- The Radiophonic Workshop
- Out of This World
- Through A Glass Darkly
- BBC Sound Effects No. 19 - Doctor Who Sound Effects
- BBC Radiophonic Workshop - 21
- BBC Sound Effects No. 26 - Sci-Fi Sound Effects
- Doctor Who - The Music
- The Soundhouse
- The Living Planet
- Doctor Who - The Music II
- Doctor Who: 30 Years at the BBC Radiophonic Workshop
- Doctor Who at the BBC Radiophonic Workshop
  - Volume 1: The Early Years 1963–1969
  - Volume 2: New Beginnings 1970–1980
  - Volume 3: The Leisure Hive
  - Volume 4: Meglos & Full Circle
- The John Baker Tapes – Volume 1: BBC Radiophonics
- BBC Radiophonic Workshop - A Retrospective
- Doctor Who – The Caves of Androzani
- Doctor Who – The Krotons
- Radiophonic Workshop
- The Vendetta Tapes
- Burials in Several Earths
- The Changes
- Doctor Who – The Five Doctors
- Possum
- The Box of Delights
- The Stone Tape
- Doctor Who – The Visitation
- La Planète Sauvage (with Stealing Sheep)
- Doctor Who – Revenge of the Cybermen
- Inventions for Radio

== Selected other works ==
=== Radio features ===
- Inventions for Radio (1964–1965)

=== Radio dramas ===
- The Foundation Trilogy (produced by David Cain) (1973)
- Good Friday: A Play in Verse (1974)
- A Wall Walks Slowly (produced by Desmond Briscoe with music by Peter Howell) (1977)
- August 2026 (produced by Malcolm Clarke) (1977)
- Notes from Janáček's Diary (produced by Maxwell Steer) (1991)
  - This was the only production ever to be realised at the Radiophonic Workshop completely by an external composer.

=== Sound effects and music contributions ===
- Radio
  - The Goon Show
  - The Hobbit (effects and music composed by David Cain) (1968)
  - The Hitchhiker's Guide to the Galaxy (effects by Paddy Kingsland with additional effects by Dick Mills. Music (except theme music) for second series by Paddy Kingsland)
  - The Lord of the Rings (effects by Elizabeth Parker) (1981)
  - Doctor Who: Slipback (BBC Radio) (music by Jonathan Gibbs) (1985)
  - Doctor Who: The Paradise of Death (BBC Radio) (music by Peter Howell) (1993)
  - Doctor Who: The Ghosts of N-Space (BBC Radio) (music by Peter Howell) (1996)
- Television
  - Quatermass and the Pit (effects by Desmond Briscoe & (uncredited) Dick Mills) (1958)
  - Doctor Who (effects by Brian Hodgson (1963–1972) & Dick Mills (1972–1989). Some additional effects provided by various Workshop members)
  - Penda's Fen (Paddy Kingsland) (1974)
  - Blake's 7 (effects by Richard Yeoman-Clark & Elizabeth Parker)
  - The Hitchhiker's Guide to the Galaxy (music and effects by Paddy Kingsland except theme music)

=== Doctor Who incidental music ===
The Doctor Who theme music was provided by the BBC Radiophonic Workshop from 1963 to 1985. From 1986 to the programme's demise the theme was provided by freelance musicians. Between 1980 and 1985 the complete incidental scores for the programme were provided in-house by the Workshop. Below is a complete list of incidental music provided by the Radiophonic Workshop for the programme.

- 1968
  - The Wheel in Space (special sounds by Brian Hodgson)
  - The Dominators (special sounds by Brian Hodgson)
  - The Mind Robber (special sounds by Brian Hodgson)
  - The Krotons (special sounds by Brian Hodgson)
- 1972
  - The Sea Devils (music by Malcolm Clarke)
- 1975
  - Revenge of the Cybermen (additional, uncredited music by Peter Howell (main score by Carey Blyton))
- 1980
  - The Leisure Hive (music by Peter Howell)
  - Meglos (music by Paddy Kingsland & Peter Howell)
  - Full Circle (music by Paddy Kingsland)
  - State of Decay (music by Paddy Kingsland)
- 1981
  - Warriors' Gate (music by Peter Howell)
  - The Keeper of Traken (music by Roger Limb)
  - Logopolis (music by Paddy Kingsland)
  - In 1981 Peter Howell also supplied the incidental music for the spin-off K-9 and Company.
- 1982
  - Castrovalva (music by Paddy Kingsland)
  - Four to Doomsday (music by Roger Limb)
  - Kinda (music by Peter Howell)
  - The Visitation (music by Paddy Kingsland)
  - Black Orchid (music by Roger Limb)
  - Earthshock (music by Malcolm Clarke)
  - Time-Flight (music by Roger Limb)
- 1983
  - Arc of Infinity (music by Roger Limb)
  - Snakedance (music by Peter Howell)
  - Terminus (music by Roger Limb)
  - Enlightenment (music by Malcolm Clarke)
  - The King's Demons (music by Peter Howell & Jonathan Gibbs)
  - "The Five Doctors" (music by Peter Howell)
- 1984
  - Warriors of the Deep (music by Jonathan Gibbs)
  - The Awakening (music by Peter Howell)
  - Resurrection of the Daleks (music by Malcolm Clarke)
  - Planet of Fire (music by Peter Howell)
  - The Caves of Androzani (music by Roger Limb)
  - The Twin Dilemma (music by Malcolm Clarke)
- 1985
  - Attack of the Cybermen (music by Malcolm Clarke)
  - Vengeance on Varos (music by Jonathan Gibbs)
  - The Mark of the Rani (music by Jonathan Gibbs)
  - The Two Doctors (music by Peter Howell)
  - Timelash (music by Elizabeth Parker (as "Liz Parker"))
  - Revelation of the Daleks (music by Roger Limb)
- 1986
  - Terror of the Vervoids (music by Malcolm Clarke)

== Works about Radiophonic Workshop ==
- Radio
  - The Sound Makers (1963)
  - The Electric Tunesmiths (1971)
    - Repeated as part of Selected Radiophonic Works in 2008.
  - The Space Between (4 October 1973)
  - Wee Have Also Sound-Houses (1979)
    - The title to this programme is a reference to Francis Bacon's 1626 novel "New Atlantis".
  - Sound in Mind (1979)
  - The Entertainers (CBC 1982)
  - Late Junction: 12 February 2008
  - Sunday Feature: Wee Have Also Sound-Houses (2008)
  - Stuart Maconie's Freak Zone: 26 October 2008
  - Selected Radiophonic Works (2008)
  - Jonny Trunk's OST Show – 2 Hours With Paddy Kingsland
  - Jonny Trunk's OST Show – David Cain Interview
- Television
  - The Same Trade as Mozart (1969)
  - The New Sound of Music (1979)
  - The Electric Music Machine, Five Days at the BBC Radiophonic Workshop (1988)
  - Alchemists of Sound (2003)
  - What the Future Sounds Like (2009)
- Books
  - Special Sound: The Creation and Legacy of the BBC Radiophonic Workshop by Louis Niebur (Oxford University Press, 2010)
  - An Electric Storm: Daphne, Delia and the BBC Radiophonic Workshop by Ned Netherwood (Obverse Books, 2014)
  - Radiophonic Times by Peter Howell (Obverse Books, 2021)
  - BBC Radiophonic Workshop: A Retrospective by William L. Weir (Bloomsbury Publishing, 2023)

== See also ==
- Music from the BBC Radiophonic Workshop
- The Radiophonic Workshop
- BBC Radiophonic Workshop – 21
- BBC Radiophonic Workshop – A Retrospective
- List of Doctor Who music releases
