= Desmond Briscoe =

English composer, sound engineer and studio manager (1925–2006)

- Born: 21 June 1925; Birkenhead, England
- Died: 7 December 2006 (aged 81)

Harry Desmond Briscoe (21 June 1925 – 7 December 2006) was an English composer, sound engineer and studio manager. He was the co-founder and original manager of the pioneering BBC Radiophonic Workshop.

Born in Birkenhead, and a drama studio manager for the BBC in the 1950s, Briscoe began to develop an interest in the use of electronic and electroacoustic techniques as a source of material for productions. Along with Daphne Oram, he worked on the BBC Radio production of Samuel Beckett’s All That Fall (tx:13 January 1957), Giles Cooper's The Disagreeable Oyster (tx:15 August 1957), and Frederick Bradnum's Private Dreams and Public Nightmares (tx:7 October 1957). These works featured some of the earliest electronic effects used by the BBC and highlighted the need for a facility to provide such material.

In 1958, Briscoe and Oram founded the BBC Radiophonic Workshop, with a remit to provide material for use in BBC radio and television programmes. Some of his first work with the workshop involved providing sounds for the science-fiction serial Quatermass and the Pit (1958–59).

To coincide with the opening of BBC Television Centre in 1960, his electronic arrangement of Eric Coates' Television March replaced the orchestral arrangement for the introduction to the 2.00pm BBC News bulletin. This was not met with universal approval, being described as "Orwellian" by one correspondent to the Radio Times, but it brought their work to wider notice on BBC Television.

Under his direction the Workshop grew from being a small back room department to being one of the most acclaimed electronic studios in the world. He remained with the Workshop until 1983, although he stepped back from organisation duties in 1977. In 1983, with Roy Curtis-Bramwell, he wrote a retrospective of the Workshop entitled The First 25 Years: The BBC Radiophonic Workshop.

The 1969 BBC album Narrow Boats - Voices, Sounds and Songs of the Canals (REB 56M) was arranged and produced by Desmond Briscoe, and edited by Dick Mills of the Radiophonic Workshop, using recordings from the BBC Sound Archive.

== Bibliography ==
- Desmond Briscoe, Roy Curtis-Bramwell, The BBC Radiophonic Workshop: the first 25 years (BBC Books, 1983)
