= David Cain (composer) =

English composer

- Born: Stoke-On-Trent, England
- Died: September 2019; Aleksandrów Łódzki, Poland
- Occupation: Composer

David Cain was a composer and technician for the BBC Radiophonic Workshop. He was educated at Imperial College London, where he earned a degree in mathematics. In 1963, he joined the BBC as a studio manager, specialising in radio drama. He transferred to the Radiophonic Workshop in 1967, where he composed various jingles and signature tunes as well as the complete incidental music for the BBC's radio productions of The War of the Worlds in 1967, and The Hobbit in 1968. He also produced the Workshop's 1973 adaptation of Isaac Asimov's Foundation series. He remained with the Radiophonic Workshop until 1973. His 30-second composition "Crossbeat" was used as the original theme for the Australian Broadcasting Corporation's morning radio current affairs program AM, which premiered in 1967.

== See also ==
- Neasden#BBC Radiophonic Workshop
