= Roger Limb =

British composer noted for his work with the BBC Radiophonic Workshop

- Born: Roger James Limb; 1941 (age 84–85); Hitchin, Hertfordshire
- Occupation: Composer

Roger James Limb is a British composer, specialising in electronic music. He was born in 1941 in Hitchin, Hertfordshire, England, UK. He is best known for his work on the television series Doctor Who whilst at the BBC Radiophonic Workshop. He joined the BBC as a studio manager, before going on to become a television announcer. In 1972 he left this position to join the Radiophonic Workshop, where he remained until 1995. Although he had received formal music training, he also spent much time in pop and jazz bands, the influence of which can be heard in much of his music.

Limb is best known for his work on Doctor Who, for which, between 1981 and 1985, he composed the music for the serials The Keeper of Traken, Four to Doomsday, Black Orchid, Time-Flight, Arc of Infinity, Terminus, The Caves of Androzani and Revelation of the Daleks.

Limb also contributed music to the television series The Justice Game, Aliens in the Family, The December Rose, Thinkabout, The Box of Delights, Kevin and Co, Martin Luther: Heretic, Storytime and the Look and Read serials "Fair Ground!", "Dark Towers", "Sky Hunter", "The King's Dragon", "Cloud Burst", "Geordie Racer", "Through The Dragon's Eye" and "Earth Warp". For the latter programme he also composed the cult favourite "Magic E" song as well as the popular education songs "Bill the Brickie", "Dog Detective" and "The Punctuation Song". His music can also be found in documentaries, including Bellamy's Backyard Safari and Submarine: Perisher: Million Pound Captains.

He also composed and played "Swirley", a cheerful piece of electronic music that was used as the theme to the BBC's Service Information news bulletins in the late 1970s/early 1980s, and arranged the songs for several series of the BBC Schools programme You and Me, featuring Cosmo and Dibs. He composed the music for the 1986 BBC series Steam Days, a series and piece of music that subsequently became familiar to railway enthusiasts all over the world. Limb was the composer of the music used in the Protect and Survive films, produced by the British government in the late 1970s to be broadcast in the event of imminent nuclear attack.

His recording "Passing Clouds" was included on the 1976 LP Out of This World, a compilation of sound effects. This track was used by Prince at the beginning of "Eye No", the opening track of 1988's Lovesexy. Out of This World was reissued in 1991 on CD as the "Essential Science Fiction Sound Effects, Volume 2"

In 2005, Limb discussed his score for Revelation of the Daleks in "Revelation Exhumed", a special feature on the DVD release of the story.
