= Malcolm Clarke (composer) =

British composer and experimental electronic musician (1943–2003)

- Born: 17 January 1943
- Died: 11 December 2003 (aged 60)
- Occupation: Composer

Malcolm Clarke (17 January 1943 – 11 December 2003) was a British composer and experimental electronic musician. He was a member of the BBC Radiophonic Workshop, which was based in Maida Vale, London, for 25 years from 1969 to 1994.

== Biography ==
Clarke proved somewhat controversial when he joined the Workshop, due to his view that radiophonic music should be, in his words, "fine art," a philosophy that was not shared by other workshop members at the time.

Clarke composed the incidental music for the Doctor Who serial The Sea Devils (1972); it was the second score that the Radiophonic Workshop provided for the series. Clarke produced the music for this serial on the Radiophonic Workshop's EMS Synthi 100 synthesizer. The score was experimental, unusual and controversial for Doctor Who at the time, with producer Barry Letts insisting that substantial edits be made for the finished programme. His score for the serial has been described as "startling in its range of obtrusive electronic timbres and relative melodic paucity", "mixed music and sound effects" and "presented uncomfortable sounds to a substantial early evening audience on Saturdays in a way not duplicated in Britain before or since".

The Radiophonic Workshop was not commissioned to produce music again for Doctor Who until 1980, when new producer John Nathan-Turner decided to fire regular composer Dudley Simpson and commission music from the Workshop instead. Clarke returned to the series to compose the music for the 1982 serial Earthshock. He continued to work on the series on a regular basis until 1986, composing the music for Enlightenment, Resurrection of the Daleks, The Twin Dilemma, Attack of the Cybermen and Terror of the Vervoids.

Clarke composed the 1976 radio piece August 2026: There Will Come Soft Rains, based on a short story by Ray Bradbury.

Outside his music interests, Clarke was an automobile enthusiast. Over a period of years he built a Bugatti from a collection of spare and scavenged parts.
