= Richard Yeoman-Clark =

British composer and sound engineer

Richard Yeoman-Clark was a British composer and sound engineer who worked at the BBC Radiophonic Workshop from 1970 to 1978.

Richard joined BBC Radio direct from St Albans School as a Technical Operator at Broadcasting House, moving to the Experimental Stereo Unit as the Recording Engineer a couple of years later. There he was involved with the integration of Stereo Operations from just test transmissions into the regular output of Radio 3 in the late 1960s. As stereo proliferated across BBC Radio he transferred to the Music Department as a Studio Manager. There his technical expertise was in demand for the presentation of electronic music concerts working with contemporary composers such as Stockhausen, Berio, Boulez etc. This experience led him to join the BBC Radiophonic Workshop where he produced the special sound for the science fiction series Blake's 7, amongst other programmes. Later he became the Technical Coordinator for the Workshop when electronic synthesizers started taking over from Musique Concrete.

Richard left the BBC in 1978 to become the Chief Technical Engineer at Roundhouse Recording Studios and oversaw the installation and operation of one of the first 3M Digital Multitrack Mastering System in the UK. Leaving Roundhouse Studios in the early 1980s, he joined F.W.O. Bauch as a field service engineer, and later became Service Manager for their professional broadcast products.

In 2002, Richard was recruited to the BFI National Archive. Working with Charles Fairall, his vast knowledge and experience of sound and digital techniques transformed the audio department's capabilities to cater for sound restoration of the optical soundtracks of films being restored by the BFI for both theatrical and DVD release. He led the sound restoration project for a special David Lean Centenary collection of ten of the best known Lean films, which were re-released digitally in 2008.

Since his retirement from the BFI in 2012, Richard was the technical powerhouse behind the Church Stretton Arts Festival, quietly providing a dazzling array of skills, knowledge and equipment each year to the benefit of numerous artists and audiences.

Richard died after a short illness on 16 September 2019.
