= Paddy Kingsland =

British musician

Paddy Kingsland (born 30 January 1947) is a composer of electronic music best known for his incidental music for science fiction series on BBC radio and television whilst working at the BBC Radiophonic Workshop. Educated at Eggar's Grammar School in Alton, Hampshire, he joined the BBC as a tape editor before becoming a studio manager for BBC Radio 1. In 1970 he joined the Radiophonic Workshop, where he remained until 1981. His initial work was mostly signature tunes for BBC radio and TV programmes. He later recorded incidental music for programmes including The Changes, two versions of The Hitchhiker's Guide to the Galaxy (the second radio series and the TV adaptation), and several serials of Doctor Who. His work on the latter series included incidental music for several serials in the early 1980s.

Other well-known series with music by Kingsland are Around the World in 80 Days and Pole to Pole, both travel series by Michael Palin. Kingsland also wrote music for many schools' television series, including Words and Pictures, Rat-a-tat-tat, Watch, Numbercrew, Storytime, English Express, Music Makers, Hotch Potch House and the Look and Read stories "Joe and the Sheep Rustlers" and "The Boy from Space". He also wrote music for the CITV series “Blips”, produced by Ragdoll Productions.

Since leaving the BBC, Kingsland has composed music for the KPM music library, television, commercials and corporate videos. He owns his own studio, PK Studios.

In 1973, Fourth Dimension, a compilation of his early signature tune work for the Radiophonic Workshop, was released. In 2002, his incidental scores for the Doctor Who serials "Meglos" and "Full Circle" featured as part of the Doctor Who at the BBC Radiophonic Workshop compilation series. KPM has issued eight albums of his library music work.

== Discography ==
=== Commercial albums ===
Year	Album details
1973	Fourth Dimension: Released 1973; Label: BBC Records (RED 93 S); Formats: LP
1974	Supercharged!: Released 1974; Label: EMI (TWOX 1024); Formats: LP
1976	Swag (as Swag): Released 1976; Label: EMI (EMC 3135); Formats: LP; Note: Written and produced with Richard Bellevue-de Sylva
2002	Doctor Who at the BBC Radiophonic Workshop Volume 4: Meglos & Full Circle (Note: Music by Paddy Kingsland and Peter Howell): Released 2002; Label: BBC Music (WMSF 6053-2); Formats: CD
2018	The Changes: Released 21 April 2018; Label: Silva Screen (SILLP1540); Formats: 2-LP (limited), download
2020	Doctor Who – The Visitation: Released 1 May 2020; Label: Silva Screen; Formats: CD, Vinyl

=== Stock music library albums ===
Year	Album details
1978	Moogerama: Released 1978; Label: Amphonic Music (AMPS 121); Format: LP
1983	The Jingle Machine: Released 1983; Label: KPM (KPM 1301); Format: LP
1984	Storytellers: Released 1984; Label: KPM (KPM 1312); Format: LP, CD
1985	The Main Chance: Released 1985; Label: KPM (KPM 1338); Format: LP
1986	The Effects Machine: Released 1986; Label: KPM (KPM 1365); Format: LP, CD
1988	Sound Images: Released 1988; Label: Themes International Music (TIM 9 CD); Format: CD
1989	Street Life: Released 1989; Label: KPM (KPM 68 CD); Format: CD
1991	The Jingle Factory: Released 1991; Label: KPM (KPM 157); Format: CD
1993	Nature: Released 1993; Label: KPM (KPM 199); Format: CD
1996	In Character: Released 1996; Label: KPM (KPM 289); Format: CD
1998	Nature + Wildlife: Released 1998; Label: Themes International Music (TIM 29 CD); Format: CD
2012	Retro Electro: Released 15 March 2012; Label: Universal Publishing Production Music (BBCPM005); Format: CD

=== Singles ===
Year	Title	Label
1974	"Spinball" (Theme From T.V. Series "Rugby Special") / "Wobulator Rock"	EMI (EMI 2110)
1976	"Wobulator Rock" / "Get Back"	EMI (EMI 2398)
1976	"London" (Radio London Theme) / "In the Bag" (as Swag)	EMI (EMI 2425)
1976	Music From "The Changes" (BBC-1 Television Series)	BBC Records RESL 33

== See also ==
- List of ambient music artists
