= The Worlds of Doctor Who =

Soundtrack album by Various Artists
- Released: May 1994
- Genre: Soundtrack
- Label: Silva Screen
- Producer: Mark Ayres

Doctor Who soundtrack chronology
30 Years at the BBC Radiophonic Workshop (1993)	The Worlds of Doctor Who (1994)	Music from The Tomb of the Cybermen (1997)

The Worlds of Doctor Who is a compilation CD consisting of musical excerpts from Doctor Who episode soundtracks, coupled with music from some of the independent spin-off productions for Reeltime Pictures, some original music and several versions of the Doctor Who theme. Most tracks (which included a mixture of original soundtrack recordings and newer performances) had been previously issued, with three tracks being released for the first time: Mark Ayres' main title music to the documentary Return to Devil's End, and two arrangements of the Doctor Who theme by Mark Lambert and Ian Hu, the second of which includes a guest performance (on the musical spoons) by Sylvester McCoy. The original theme arrangements by Delia Derbyshire and Peter Howell are also included.

The liner notes are by Gary Russell. The album was compiled and edited by Mark Ayres.

== Track listing ==
Track	Title	Composer	Previously released on
1	"Doctor Who"	Ron Grainer arr. Mark Lambert and Ian Hu	Previously Unreleased
2	"TARDIS - Doctor Who"	Ron Grainer realised by Delia Derbyshire	Doctor Who - The Music
3	"The World of Doctor Who"	Dudley Simpson	Doctor Who - The Music
4	"The Sea Devils"	Malcolm Clarke	Doctor Who - The Music
5	"The Ark in Space"	Dudley Simpson arr. Heathcliff Blair	Doctor Who - Pyramids of Mars
6	"Pyramids of Mars"	Dudley Simpson arr. Heathcliff Blair	Doctor Who - Pyramids of Mars
7	"The Brain of Morbius"	Dudley Simpson arr. Heathcliff Blair	Doctor Who - Pyramids of Mars
8	"Doctor Who theme"	Ron Grainer arr. Peter Howell	Doctor Who - The Music
9	"Meglos"	Peter Howell	Doctor Who - The Music
10	"The Five Doctors" ^{[b]}	Peter Howell	Doctor Who - The Music II
11	"The Caves of Androzani" ^{[b]}	Roger Limb	Doctor Who - The Music II
12	"Myth Makers theme"	Mark Ayres	Myths and Other Legends
13	"Doctor Who - Terror Version"	Ron Grainer arr. Dominic Glynn	Doctor Who: Variations on a Theme
14	"Terror in Totters Lane"	Mark Ayres	Myths and Other Legends
15	"The Greatest Show in the Galaxy" ^{[a]}	Mark Ayres	Doctor Who: The Greatest Show in the Galaxy
16	"Ghost Light" ^{[a]}	Mark Ayres	Doctor Who: Ghost Light
17	"The Curse of Fenric" ^{[a]}	Mark Ayres	Doctor Who: The Curse of Fenric
18	"Return to Devil's End Main Theme"	Mark Ayres	Previously Unreleased
19	"Doctor Who"	Ron Grainer arr. Mark Lambert and Ian Hu, feat. Sylvester McCoy	Previously Unreleased

^a Suite edited by Mark Ayres from his own soundtrack release
^b Edited by Mark Ayres from the original suite
