= List of Doctor Who music releases =

This is a list of music releases from and relating to the BBC television series Doctor Who. It is split into two sections: One for soundtracks of music from the show and its spinoffs, and one for music relating to the series, mainly novelty or tribute releases.

== Soundtrack music ==
=== Doctor Who ===
==== Albums ====
There have been several LP and CD releases of music and sound effects over the years from the BBC television series Doctor Who by the BBC Radiophonic Workshop, freelance composers, and stock music.

| Title | Composer | Label | Format | Original release date |
|---|---|---|---|---|
| BBC Sound Effects No. 19 - Doctor Who Sound Effects | BBC Radiophonic Workshop | BBC Records | LP/Cassette | May 1978 |
In mono, with sound effects from the Jon Pertwee and Tom Baker eras of Doctor Who. Reissues Reissued on CD in Spain by Diapason in 1990 as Efectos De Sonido - Ciencia Ficcion. Reissued on CD by AudioGo in a "facsimile" edition recreating the original artwork 2 February 2012. Reissued on LP by AudioGo and Discovery Records on 21 April 2012 as part of Record Store Day.
| BBC Sound Effects No. 26 - Sci-Fi Sound Effects | BBC Radiophonic Workshop | BBC Records | LP/Cassette | December 1981 |
Seventeen stereo sound effects, by Dick Mills, from Season Eighteen of Doctor Who were included on this release. Reissues Reissued on CD in 1991 as Essential Science Fiction Sound Effects Vol. 1. Reissued on CD by AudioGo in a "facsimile" edition recreating the original artwork 4 April 2013.
| Doctor Who - The Music | BBC Radiophonic Workshop | BBC Records | LP | February 1983 |
Reissues Reissued on CD by Silva Screen Records in November 1992 as Earthshock – Classic Music From The BBC Radiophonic Workshop Volume 1 with bonus tracks
| Doctor Who - The Music II | BBC Radiophonic Workshop | BBC Records | LP | February 1985 |
Reissues Reissued on CD by Silva Screen Records in November 1992 as The Five Doctors – Classic Music From The BBC Radiophonic Workshop Volume 2 with bonus tracks
| Space Adventures - Music from 'Doctor Who' 1963–1968 | Stock music | Doctor Who Appreciation Society | Cassette | September 1987 |
Limited edition (300 copies) cassette release of stock music used in the series. Reissued on CD, expanded to cover through 1971, by the researcher Julian Knott in 1998, again in a limited issue of 300 copies.
| Black Light - The Doctor Who Music of Dominic Glynn | Dominic Glynn | Doctor Who Appreciation Society | Cassette | July 1988 |
Music from The Mysterious Planet, The Ultimate Foe, and Dragonfire
| The Doctor Who 25th Anniversary Album | Keff McCulloch | BBC Records | LP/Cassette/CD | November 1988 |
Also includes versions of the Doctor Who Theme by Delia Derbyshire, Peter Howell, and Dominic Glynn. Reissues Reissued on CD as Evolution - The Music From Dr Who by Prestige Records in May 1997. Reissued on CD as Music from Doctor Who by Castle Pulse in April 2002.
| The Corridor of Eternity - The Music of Paddy Kingsland | Paddy Kingsland | Doctor Who Appreciation Society | Cassette | October 1990 |
Music from Castrovalva and Mawdryn Undead
| Doctor Who: The Curse of Fenric | Mark Ayres | Silva Screen Records | CD | July 1991 |
| Doctor Who: The Greatest Show in the Galaxy | Mark Ayres | Silva Screen Records | CD | April 1992 |
| Doctor Who: Ghost Light | Mark Ayres | Silva Screen Records | CD | June 1993 |
Reissued on CD with extra tracks on 26 August 2013.
| Doctor Who: Pyramids of Mars | Dudley Simpson | Silva Screen Records | CD | June 1993 |
Re-recorded from the original scores of various Fourth Doctor serials on synthesiser by Heathcliff Blair.
| The Best of Doctor Who Volume 1 – The Five Doctors | BBC Radiophonic Workshop | Silva America | CD | June 1993 |
Compilation for select tracks from The Music and The Music II plus the "Terror Version" of the theme music from Variations on a Theme (see below)
| Doctor Who: 30 Years at the BBC Radiophonic Workshop | BBC Radiophonic Workshop | BBC Enterprises | CD | July 1993 |
Compilation of sound effects, atmospheres, and music produced at the BBC Radiophonic Workshop
| The Worlds of Doctor Who | Various | Silva Screen Records | CD | May 1994 |
Compilation of Silva Screen's Doctor Who soundtrack output
| The Best of Doctor Who Volume 2 – The Greatest Show in the Galaxy | Mark Ayres | Silva America | CD | September 1994 |
Compilation of edited highlights from Mark Ayres's three scores released on Silva Screen plus the McCulloch arrangement of the theme music.
| Music from The Tomb of the Cybermen | Stock music | Via Satellite Records | CD | May 1997 |
Compilation of stock music used in this Doctor Who serial.
| Doctor Who: Original Soundtrack Recording | John Debney, John Sponsler and Louis Febre | John Debney Productions | CD | July 1997 |
Music from the 1996 TV movie. Promotional CD release by the composer
| Sherlock Holmes Meets Dr Who | Carey Blyton | Upbeat Classics | CD | May 1999 |
Contains new recordings of suites of music from Doctor Who and the Silurians, Death to the Daleks, and Revenge of the Cybermen
| Doctor Who: Terror of the Zygons | Geoffrey Burgon | BBC Music | CD | 24 January 2000 |
Music from Terror of the Zygons and The Seeds of Doom.
| Doctor Who at the BBC Radiophonic Workshop Volume 1: The Early Years 1963–1969 | BBC Radiophonic Workshop | BBC Music | CD | 29 May 2000 |
Reissues Reissued on CD by Mute Records 23 May 2005
| Doctor Who at the BBC Radiophonic Workshop Volume 2: New Beginnings 1970–1980 | BBC Radiophonic Workshop | BBC Music | CD | 29 May 2000 |
Reissues Reissued on CD by Mute Records 23 May 2005
| Dr Who - Music from the Tenth Planet | Stock music | Ochre Records | CD | May 2000 |
| Doctor Who at the BBC Radiophonic Workshop Volume 3: The Leisure Hive | Peter Howell and Dick Mills at the BBC Radiophonic Workshop | BBC Music | CD | 18 March 2002 |
| Doctor Who at the BBC Radiophonic Workshop Volume 4: Meglos & Full Circle | Paddy Kingsland and Peter Howell at the BBC Radiophonic Workshop | BBC Music | CD | 18 March 2002 |
| The Film Production Music | Carey Blyton | Apollo Sound | CD | 2003 |
Contains suites of music from Doctor Who and the Silurians, Death to the Daleks, and Revenge of the Cybermen
| Doctor Who: Devils' Planets - The Music of Tristram Cary | Tristram Cary | BBC Music | 2-CD | 1 September 2003 |
Incidental music from The Daleks, The Daleks' Master Plan and The Mutants.
| Doctor Who: Original Television Soundtrack | Murray Gold | Silva Screen Records | CD | 11 December 2006 |
Music from series one and two, featuring two songs performed by Neil Hannon. Reissued in a limited edition of 500 2-LP sets on 2 September 2013.
| Doctor Who – The Gunfighters | Tristram Cary | BBC Audio | 2-CD | 5 February 2007 |
This narrated soundtrack release included as an extra "The Ballad of the Last Chance Saloon" composed for this story by Tristram Cary.
| Doctor Who: Series 3 | Murray Gold | Silva Screen Records | CD | 5 November 2007 |
Featuring two songs performed by Yamit Mamo.
| Doctor Who: Series 4 | Murray Gold | Silva Screen Records | CD | 17 November 2008 |
Features music selections from "Voyage of the Damned" and all of the Series 4 episodes originally broadcast in 2008 except for "The Next Doctor" Christmas Special.
| Doctor Who: Series 4 – The Specials | Murray Gold | Silva Screen Records | 2-CD | 4 October 2010 |
Features music selections from the Series 4 special episodes "The Next Doctor", "Planet of the Dead", "The Waters of Mars", and "The End of Time".
| Doctor Who: Series 5 | Murray Gold | Silva Screen Records | 2-CD | 8 November 2010 |
| Doctor Who: A Christmas Carol | Murray Gold | Silva Screen Records | CD/Download | 21 March 2011 |
Featuring Katherine Jenkins singing "Abigail’s Song". Reissues Reissued on white vinyl LP in a limited first pressing edition of 500 on 1 December 2014
| Doctor Who: Series 6 | Murray Gold | Silva Screen Records | 2-CD | 19 December 2011 |
| Doctor Who: The Caves of Androzani | Roger Limb and the BBC Radiophonic Workshop | Silva Screen Records | CD/Download | 25 March 2013 |
Reissues Reissued in a 2-LP set on translucent purple vinyl by Silva Screen Records on 25 November 2013.
| Doctor Who: A 50th Anniversary Tribute | Murray Gold | Dominik Hauser | Download | 26 March 2013 |
Re-recordings arranged and produced by Dominik Hauser.
| John Smith and the Common Men: Sounds from the Inferno | Stock music | Hysterion Records | 7-inch EP | 20 April 2013 |
Limited edition of 1000 for Record Store Day 2013. Contains "Three Guitars Mood 2" from An Unearthly Child as well as "Latin Gear" and "The Eyelash" from The War Machines
| Doctor Who: The Krotons | Brian Hodgson and the BBC Radiophonic Workshop | Silva Screen Records | CD/download/10-inch vinyl | 13 May 2013 |
| Doctor Who: Series 7 | Murray Gold | Silva Screen Records | 2-CD | 9 September 2013 |
| Doctor Who: The Snowmen/The Doctor, The Widow and The Wardrobe | Murray Gold | Silva Screen Records | CD | 21 October 2013 |
Includes music from "The Snowmen" and "The Doctor, the Widow and the Wardrobe"
| Doctor Who: The 50th Anniversary Collection | Various | Silva Screen Records | 4-CD | 9 December 2013 |
Other versions Released in a condensed 2-disc release in the US on 17 December 2013 (digital download) and 4 February 2014 (CD) Released in an expanded limited 11-disc box set 26 September 2014 Released in a 4-LP vinyl set 25 February 2016 Dubbed the Cyberman edition, this limited edition set (1,000 copies) is pressed in metallic silver vinyl. Also pressed in "Adipose white", limited to 100 copies through Spacelab9.
| Cold Worlds | Don Harper | Dual Planet | LP/CD | 7 July 2014 |
Re-recording of the score from The Invasion
| The Ultra Sonic Perception | Eric Siday | Dual Planet | LP/CD | 7 July 2014 |
A collection of stock music, including some used in Doctor Who.
| Doctor Who: The Day of the Doctor/The Time of the Doctor | Murray Gold | Silva Screen Records | 2-CD | 24 November 2014 |
Includes music from "The Day of the Doctor" and "The Time of the Doctor"
| Doctor Who: Best of Series One Through Seven | Murray Gold | Silva Screen Records/ SPACELAB9 | LP Picture Disc | 23 December 2014 |
Selected tracks from the Series 1/2 through Series 7 soundtracks. Limited to 3,000 copies. Exclusive to Hot Topic.
| Doctor Who: Series 8 | Murray Gold | Silva Screen Records | 3-CD | 18 May 2015 |
| Doctor Who: A Musical Adventure Through Time and Space, Volume One | Murray Gold, John Debney, John Sponsler and Louis Febre | BSX Records | CD | 28 August 2015 |
Re-recordings of music from the 1996 TV movie and Series 1 – 8 produced and arranged by Dominik Hauser.
| Doctor Who: The Daleks | Tristram Cary | Silva Screen Records | CD | 15 September 2017 |
Also includes special sounds by Brian Hodgson at the BBC Radiophonic Workshop. Reissued on 12-inch vinyl LP 24 November 2017.
| Doctor Who: Survival | Dominic Glynn | Silva Screen Records | CD | 15 September 2017 |
Reissued on 12-inch vinyl LP 24 November 2017.
| Doctor Who: Series 9 | Murray Gold | Silva Screen Records | 4-CD | 27 April 2018 |
| Doctor Who: The Invasion | Don Harper | Silva Screen Records | CD | 14 September 2018 |
Also includes Radiophonic effects by Brian Hodgson. Also released on LP 28 September 2018, omitting some effects.
| Doctor Who: The Five Doctors | Peter Howell and the BBC Radiophonic Workshop | Silva Screen Records | CD | 14 September 2018 |
Includes both the original and special edition scores, as well as a selection of effects by Dick Mills. Also released on 2-LP 28 September 2018, omitting the effects.
| Doctor Who: Series 11 | Segun Akinola | Silva Screen Records | 2-CD | 11 January 2019 |
| Doctor Who: The Music Collection | various | Silva Screen Records | CD | 9 January 2020 |
Promotional sampler exclusive to Doctor Who Magazine #547 sold at WHSmith
| Doctor Who: Series 12 | Segun Akinola | Silva Screen Records | 2-CD | 3 April 2020 |
| Doctor Who: The Sun Makers | Dudley Simpson | Silva Screen Records | CD/LP | 1 May 2020 |
| Doctor Who: The Visitation | Paddy Kingsland and the BBC Radiophonic Workshop | Silva Screen Records | CD/LP | 1 May 2020 |
| Doctor Who: Series 12 – Revolution of the Daleks | Segun Akinola | Silva Screen Records | Digital | 2 January 2021 |
| Doctor Who: Series 13 – Flux | Segun Akinola | Silva Screen Records | Digital/3-CD | 30 September 2022 |
The third CD includes the Revolution of the Daleks score; this is not included in the digital album. CD version released 11 November 2022.
| Doctor Who: Series 13 – Eve of the Daleks | Segun Akinola | Silva Screen Records | Digital | 2 December 2022 |
| Doctor Who: Series 13 – Legend of the Sea Devils | Segun Akinola | Silva Screen Records | Digital | 9 December 2022 |
| Doctor Who: Series 13 – The Power of the Doctor | Segun Akinola | Silva Screen Records | Digital | 16 December 2022 |
| Doctor Who: Series 13 – The Specials | Segun Akinola | Silva Screen Records | 3-CD | 13 January 2023 |
CD release of the above three digital releases
| Doctor Who: Time and the Rani | Keff McCulloch | Silva Screen Records | CD | 24 November 2023 |
| Doctor Who: Revenge of the Cybermen | Carey Blyton with Peter Howell and the BBC Radiophonic Workshop | Silva Screen Records | CD | 24 November 2023 |
| Doctor Who: The Daleks in Colour | Tristram Cary & Mark Ayres | Silva Screen Records | CD, digital | 13 September 2024 |
Soundtrack to the edited and colourised version of The Daleks broadcast in November 2023
| Doctor Who: Series 10 | Murray Gold | Silva Screen Records | 2-CD, digital | 12 December 2025 |
| Doctor Who: Timelash | Elizabeth Parker | Silva Screen Records | CD, digital | 13 November 2026 |
| Doctor Who: The Star Beast | Murray Gold | Silva Screen Records | Digital | 23 November 2026 |
| Doctor Who: Wild Blue Yonder | Murray Gold | Silva Screen Records | Digital | 23 November 2026 |
| Doctor Who: The Giggle | Murray Gold | Silva Screen Records | Digital | 23 November 2026 |
| Doctor Who: The 60th Anniversary Specials | Murray Gold | Silva Screen Records | 3-CD | 27 November 2026 |
CD release of the above three digital releases

==== Singles ====
| Title | Artist | Label | Format | Original release date |
|---|---|---|---|---|
| "Doctor Who" b/w "It Must Be Love" by Brenda and Johnny | BBC Radiophonic Workshop | Decca | 7" | February 1964 |
Delia Derbyshire arrangement
| "Doctor Who" b/w "Reg" by Paddy Kingsland at the BBC Radiophonic Workshop | Delia Derbyshire at the BBC Radiophonic Workshop | BBC Records | 7" | April 1973 |
Stereo version of the Delia Derbyshire arrangement
| "Doctor Who" b/w "The Astronauts" | Peter Howell and the BBC Radiophonic Workshop | BBC Records | 7" | October 1980 |
Peter Howell arrangement
| "Doctor Who" b/w "Doctor Who" (Cosmic Remix) by Mankind | Dominic Glynn | BBC Records | 7", 12", cassette | October 1986 |
Dominic Glynn arrangement; 12" and cassette version add the Delia Derbyshire arrangement
| "Doctor Who Theme" b/w "Time Beat" by Ray Cathode | Delia Derbyshire | Harkit Records | 7" | December 2013 |
Delia Derbyshire arrangement
| "Doctor Who Theme" b/w "Strange Lines and Distances" | Delia Derbyshire | Electronic Sound | 7" | 15 November 2019 |
Delia Derbyshire arrangement. Bundled with Electronic Sound issue 59.
| "Dalek City Corridor" / "Dalek Control Room" / "Explosion, Tardis Stops" b/w "Inventions For Radio - The Dreams (Excerpt)" by Barry Bermange in collaboration with Delia Derbyshire | Brian Hodgson and the BBC Radiophonic Workshop | Electronic Sound | 7" | 12 October 2023 |
Bundled with Electronic Sound issue 106.
| "The Goblin Song" | Murray Gold | Silva Screen Records | Digital | 11 December 2023 |
Single from the 2023 Christmas special, "The Church on Ruby Road"

==== Home video isolated scores ====
Various stories have been released on DVD/Blu-ray by BBC Video/2 Entertain (unless otherwise indicated) with isolated scores as an option during viewing.

| Title | Composer | Format | Original release date |
|---|---|---|---|
| Remembrance of the Daleks | Keff McCulloch | DVD | 26 February 2001 |
Reissued on the Blu-ray box set The Collection: Season 25 (UK)/ Silvester McCoy: Complete Season Two (USA) 21 October 2024
| The Caves of Androzani | Roger Limb | DVD | 18 June 2001 |
| The Movie | John Debney, John Sponsler, and Louis Febre | DVD | 13 August 2001 |
| Resurrection of the Daleks | Malcolm Clarke | DVD | 18 December 2002 |
| Earthshock | Malcolm Clarke | DVD | 18 August 2003 |
Reissued on the Blu-ray box set The Collection: Season 19 (UK)/ Peter Davison: Complete Season One (USA) 4 December 2018
| The Two Doctors | Peter Howell | DVD | 8 September 2003 |
| The Curse of Fenric | Mark Ayres | DVD | 6 October 2003 |
Reissued on the Blu-ray box set The Collection: Season 26 (UK)/ Sylvester McCoy: Complete Season Three (USA) 27 January 2020
| The Visitation | Paddy Kingsland | DVD | 19 January 2004 |
Reissued on the Blu-ray box set The Collection: Season 19 (UK)/ Peter Davison: Complete Season One (USA) 4 December 2018
| The Leisure Hive | Peter Howell | DVD | 5 July 2004 |
Reissued on the Blu-ray box set The Collection: Season 18 (UK)/ Tom Baker: Complete Season Seven (USA) 18 March 2019
| Ghost Light | Mark Ayres | DVD | 20 September 2004 |
Reissued on the Blu-ray box set The Collection: Season 26 (UK)/ Sylvester McCoy: Complete Season Three (USA) 27 January 2020
| Revelation of the Daleks | Roger Limb | DVD | 11 July 2005 |
| The Mark of the Rani | Jonathan Gibbs | DVD | 4 September 2006 |
| The Keeper of Traken | Roger Limb | DVD | 29 January 2007 |
Reissued on the Blu-ray box set The Collection: Season 18 (UK)/ Tom Baker: Complete Season Seven (USA) 18 March 2019
| Logopolis | Paddy Kingsland | DVD | 29 January 2007 |
Reissued on the Blu-ray box set The Collection: Season 18 (UK)/ Tom Baker: Complete Season Seven (USA) 18 March 2019
| Castrovalva | Paddy Kingsland | DVD | 29 January 2007 |
Reissued on the Blu-ray box set The Collection: Season 19 (UK)/ Peter Davison: Complete Season One (USA) 4 December 2018
| Survival | Dominic Glynn | DVD | 6 April 2007 |
Reissued on the Blu-ray box set The Collection: Season 26 (UK)/ Sylvester McCoy: Complete Season Three (USA) 27 January 2020
| Arc of Infinity | Roger Limb | DVD | 6 August 2007 |
| Doctor Who and the Silurians | Carey Blyton | DVD | 14 January 2008 |
Reissued on the Blu-ray box set The Collection: Season 7 (UK)/ Jon Pertwee: Complete Season One (USA) 3 March 2025
| The Sea Devils | Malcolm Clarke | DVD | 14 January 2008 |
| Warriors of the Deep | Jonathan Gibbs | DVD | 14 January 2008 |
| "The Five Doctors" | Peter Howell | DVD | 3 March 2008 |
Original mono mix on disc 1, stereo version of the Special Edition on disc 2.
| Battlefield | Keff McCulloch | DVD | 26 December 2008 |
Reissued on the Blu-ray box set The Collection: Season 26 (UK)/ Sylvester McCoy: Complete Season Three (USA) 27 January 2020
| Full Circle | Paddy Kingsland | DVD | 26 January 2009 |
Reissued on the Blu-ray box set The Collection: Season 18 (UK)/ Tom Baker: Complete Season Seven (USA) 18 March 2019
| State of Decay | Paddy Kingsland | DVD | 26 January 2009 |
Reissued on the Blu-ray box set The Collection: Season 18 (UK)/ Tom Baker: Complete Season Seven (USA) 18 March 2019
| Warriors' Gate | Peter Howell | DVD | 26 January 2009 |
Reissued on the Blu-ray box set The Collection: Season 18 (UK)/ Tom Baker: Complete Season Seven (USA) 18 March 2019
| Attack of the Cybermen | Malcom Clarke | DVD | 16 March 2009 |
| Mawdryn Undead | Paddy Kingsland | DVD | 10 August 2009 |
| Terminus | Roger Limb | DVD | 10 August 2009 |
| Enlightenment | Malcolm Clarke | DVD | 10 August 2009 |
| The King's Demons | Jonathan Gibbs | DVD | 14 June 2010 |
| Planet of Fire | Peter Howell | DVD | 14 June 2010 |
| Silver Nemesis | Keff McCulloch | DVD | 9 August 2010 |
Reissued on the Blu-ray box set The Collection: Season 25 (UK)/ Silvester McCoy: Complete Season Two (USA) 21 October 2024
| The Seeds of Doom | Geoffrey Burgon | DVD | 25 October 2010 |
| Meglos | Paddy Kingsland and Peter Howell | DVD | 4 January 2011 |
Reissued on the Blu-ray box set The Collection: Season 18 (UK)/ Tom Baker: Complete Season Seven (USA) 18 March 2019
| Kinda | Peter Howell | DVD | 7 March 2011 |
Reissued on the Blu-ray box set The Collection: Season 19 (UK)/ Peter Davison: Complete Season One (USA) 4 December 2018
| Snakedance | Peter Howell | DVD | 7 March 2011 |
| Frontios | Paddy Kingsland | DVD | 30 May 2011 |
| The Awakening | Peter Howell | DVD | 20 June 2011 |
| Dragonfire | Dominic Glynn | DVD | 7 May 2012 |
Reissued on the Blu-ray box set The Collection: Season 24 (UK)/Sylvester McCoy: Complete Season One (USA) box set 21 June 2021.
| The Happiness Patrol | Dominic Glynn | DVD | 7 May 2012 |
Reissued on the Blu-ray box set The Collection: Season 25 (UK)/ Silvester McCoy: Complete Season Two (USA) 21 October 2024
| The Greatest Show in the Galaxy | Mark Ayres | DVD | 30 July 2012 |
Reissued on the Blu-ray box set The Collection: Season 25 (UK)/ Silvester McCoy: Complete Season Two (USA) 21 October 2024
| Vengeance on Varos | Jonathan Gibbs | DVD | 10 September 2012 |
Released only on the Special Edition. Original release instead offered Unmixed Soundtrack with no music or Sound Effects
| Scream of the Shalka | Russell Stone | DVD | 16 September 2013 |
"Soundtrack album" released as a standalone feature
| Terror of the Zygons | Geoffrey Burgon | DVD | 30 September 2013 |
| Revenge of the Cybermen | Carey Blyton | DVD/Blu-Ray | 15 March 2019 |
Released in Germany by Pandastorm as Die Rache der Cybermen
| Black Orchid | Roger Limb | DVD/Blu-Ray | 19 July 2019 |
Released in Germany by Pandastorm as Die schwarze Orchidee
| The Mysterious Planet | Dominic Glynn | Blu-ray | 7 October 2019 |
Released as part of The Collection: Season 23 (UK)/Colin Baker: Complete Season Two (USA) box set
| Mindwarp | Richard Hartley | Blu-ray | 7 October 2019 |
Re-recording of the original score as the music tapes were lost. Released as part of The Collection: Season 23 (UK)/Colin Baker: Complete Season Two (USA) box set
| Terror of the Vervoids | Malcolm Clarke | Blu-ray | 7 October 2019 |
Released as part of The Collection: Season 23 (UK)/Colin Baker: Complete Season Two (USA) box set
| The Ultimate Foe | Dominic Glynn | Blu-ray | 7 October 2019 |
Released as part of The Collection: Season 23 (UK)/Colin Baker: Complete Season Two (USA) box set
| Four to Doomsday | Roger Limb | DVD/Blu-Ray | 21 February 2020 |
Released in Germany by Pandastorm as Vier vor Zwölf
| The Power of the Daleks | Tristram Cary | DVD/Blu-ray | 27 July 2020 |
Released only on the Special Edition release. Featured here as an unedited compilation rather than as an Isolated Score
| Time-Flight | Roger Limb | DVD/Blu-Ray | 25 September 2020 |
Released in Germany by Pandastorm as Zeitflug
| Time and the Rani | Keff McCulloch | Blu-ray | 21 June 2021 |
Released as part of The Collection: Season 24 (UK)/Sylvester McCoy: Complete Season One (USA) box set
| Paradise Towers | Keff McCulloch | Blu-ray | 21 June 2021 |
Released as part of The Collection: Season 24 (UK)/Sylvester McCoy: Complete Season One (USA) box set
| Delta and the Bannermen | Keff McCulloch | Blu-ray | 21 June 2021 |
Released as part of The Collection: Season 24 (UK)/Sylvester McCoy: Complete Season One (USA) box set

=== Spinoffs ===
==== Feature films ====
| Title | Composer | Label | Format | Original release date |
|---|---|---|---|---|
| "The Eccentric Dr. Who" b/w "Daleks & Thals" | Malcolm Lockyer | Columbia | 7" | 13 August 1965 |
Rearrangements of the theme and incidental music from Dr. Who and the Daleks
| "Fugue for Thought" b/w "Fair's Fair" | Bill McGuffie | Philips | 7" | February 1967 |
A-side is a rearrangement of the music from the opening scene of Daleks' Invasion Earth: 2150 A.D.
| Dr. Who & the Daleks | Malcolm Lockyer and Bill McGuffie | Silva Screen | CD | 5 October 2009 |
Music from Dr. Who and the Daleks and Daleks' Invasion Earth: 2150 A.D. with effects by Barry Gray Reissues 16 April 2016 (yellow double vinyl, limited to 750 copies, released for Record Store Day)
| Dr. Who and the Daleks/Daleks Invasion of Earth 2150 A.D. | Malcolm Lockyer and Bill McGuffie | Silva Screen | 7-inch EP | 16 April 2011 |
Released as part of Record Store Day. Side Two is a mini-adventure featuring the film's dialogue with music by Bill McGuffie
| Dr. Who & the Daleks | Malcolm Lockyer | StudioCanal/Silva Screen | LP | 31 October 2022 |
Released with 4K UHD and Blu-ray discs of the film.
| Daleks' Invasion Earth A.D. 2150 | Malcolm Lockyer, Bill McGuffie, and Barry Gray | StudioCanal/Silva Screen | LP | 31 October 2022 |
Released with 4K UHD and Blu-ray discs of the film.

==== Television spinoffs ====
| Title | Composer | Label | Format | Original release date |
|---|---|---|---|---|
| "K-9 and Co." b/w "Shana the Star Dancer" by Phil Wells | Fiachra Trench and Ian Levine | Solid Gold | 7" | January 1982 |
Single release of theme music
| Torchwood: Original Television Soundtrack | Ben Foster and Murray Gold | Silva Screen Records | Download/CD | 5 August 2008 |
Music from Series 1 and 2
| Torchwood: Children of Earth | Ben Foster | Silva Screen Records | Download/CD | 7 July 2009 |
| An Adventure in Space and Time | Edmund Butt | Silva Screen | CD | 3 March 2014 |
| Class: Original Television Soundtrack | Blair Mowat | Silva Screen | CD/2-LP | 7 December 2018 |
Limited marbled vinyl edition released 4 January 2019. Both CD and LP editions are available with a bonus CD of additional score cues.
| "Barclay's Theme" | Lorne Balfe | Silva Screen | Digital | 28 November 2025 |
From The War Between the Land and the Sea
| The War Between the Land and the Sea | Lorne Balfe | Silva Screen | Digital | 5 December 2025 |
CD released 30 January 2026
| "'Heroes'" | David Bowie & Brian Eno | A.G. Records | Digital | 12 December 2025 |
Cover by Alison Goldfrapp and Lorne Balfe from The War Between the Land and the Sea
| Class: Original Television Soundtrack Vol. II | Blair Mowat | Silva Screen | Digital | 23 October 2026 |
Re-release of the 2018 bonus CD featuring several previously unreleased bonus tracks.

==== Direct to video spinoffs ====
| Title | Composer | Label | Format | Original release date |
|---|---|---|---|---|
| Myths and Other Legends | Mark Ayres | Metro Music | LP | January 1990 |
Ayres's music for Reeltime Pictures' Myth Makers series of Doctor Who interviews. Reissues Reissued in an expanded format on CD by Silva Screen Records in August 1991
| Downtime: Original Soundtrack Recording | Ian Levine, Nigel Stock, & Erwin Keiles | Silva Screen Records | CD | December 1995 |
Music from the direct-to-video spinoff
| Shakedown: Return of the Sontarans – Original Soundtrack Recording | Mark Ayres | Silva Screen Records | CD | January 1996 |
Music from the direct-to-video spinoff
| Dæmos Rising: The Music | Alistair Lock | Reeltime | CD | 14 March 2004 |
Music from the direct-to-DVD spinoff

==== Big Finish ====
Music from the Big Finish range of audios.

| Title | Composer | Label | Format | Original release date |
|---|---|---|---|---|
| Doctor Who: Music from the New Audio Adventures – Volume I | Alistair Lock | Big Finish | CD | September 2000 |
Music from Phantasmagoria, The Fearmonger, The Marian Conspiracy, and The Spectre of Lanyon Moor
| Doctor Who: Music from the New Audio Adventures – Volume II | Alistair Lock | Big Finish | CD | March 2001 |
Music from Last of the Titans, The Shadow of the Scourge and The Fires of Vulcan
| Doctor Who: Music from the New Audio Adventures – Volume III | Russell Stone | Big Finish | CD | June 2001 |
Music from Red Dawn, Winter for the Adept, and The Holy Terror
| Doctor Who: Music from the Eighth Doctor Audio Adventures | Alistair Lock, Nicholas Briggs, Russell Stone & William Allen | Big Finish | 2-CD | January 2002 |
Music from Storm Warning, Sword of Orion, The Stones of Venice, and Minuet in Hell, plus the Eighth Doctor Big Finish Theme
| Doctor Who: Music from the Fifth Doctor Audio Adventures | Alistair Lock, David Darlington & Russell Stone | Big Finish | CD | October 2002 |
Music from Loups-Garoux, The Eye of the Scorpion, and Primeval
| Doctor Who: Music from the Sixth Doctor Audio Adventures | Alistair Lock, Jim Mortimore & Jane Elphinstone | Big Finish | CD | November 2002 |
Music from Bloodtide, Project: Twilight, The One Doctor
| Doctor Who: Music from the Excelis Audio Adventures | David Darlington | Big Finish | CD | December 2002 |
Music from Excelis Dawns, Excelis Rising, Excelis Decays, and The Plague Herds of Excelis
| Doctor Who: Music from the Seventh Doctor Audio Adventures | Andy Hardwick, Jim Mortimore & Russell Stone | Big Finish | CD | April 2003 |
Music from Dust Breeding, The Rapture, and Bang-Bang-a-Boom!
| Doctor Who - Embrace the Darkness - Remastered | Jim Mortimore | Bandcamp | Download | 11 October 2012 |
| Doctor Who - The Rapture - Remastered | Jim Mortimore with Jane Elphinstone & Simon Robinson | Bandcamp | Download | 28 October 2012 |
| Doctor Who - Project Twilight - Remastered | Jim Mortimore | Bandcamp | Download | 19 November 2012 |
| Doctor Who - He Jests at Scars - Remastered | Jim Mortimore | Bandcamp | Download | 16 December 2012 |
| Doctor Who - Seasons of Fear - Remastered | Jane Elphinstone | Bandcamp | Download | 6 January 2013 |
| Doctor Who - Davros - Remastered | Jane Elphinstone | Bandcamp | Download | 4 February 2013 |
| Escape to Danger | Joe Kraemer | La-La Land Records | CD | 14 July 2020 |
Music from The Defectors and Absolute Power
| Seabird One | Borna Matosic | Borna Matosic | Digital | June 2023 |
Music from the UNIT: Brave New World audio series
| Visitants | Borna Matosic | Borna Matosic | Digital | June 2023 |
Music from the UNIT: Brave New World audio series
| The Eleventh Doctor Chronicles | Borna Matosic | Borna Matosic | Digital | 11 July 2025 |

==== Other spinoffs ====
| Title | Composer | Label | Format | Original release date |
|---|---|---|---|---|
| Doctor Who: The Edge of Time | Richard Wilkinson | Richard Wilkinson (digital); Demon Music Group (LP) | Digital/2-LP | 12 November 2019 |
Music from the VR game.
| Doctor Who Am I | Mark Leggett | Mark Leggett | Digital | 7 October 2022 |
Music from the documentary.
| inDoctornated | Dominic Glynn | No Bones Music | Digital | 18 August 2025 |
Music from the documentary.

== Related music releases ==
Over the years, there have been music releases that did not feature in the series, but are related to Doctor Who, ranging from novelty spoofs to tributes to the series.

| Title | Composer | Label | Format | Original release date |
|---|---|---|---|---|
| "I'm Gonna Spend My Christmas With A Dalek" | The Go-Go's | Oriole (UK) | 7-inch | December 1964 |
| "Who's Who" | Roberta Tovey | Polydor Records (UK) | 7-inch | August 1965 |
| "Who's Dr. Who?" | Frazer Hines | Major Minor (UK) | 7-inch | October 1968 |
| "Who Is The Doctor" | Jon Pertwee | Purple Records (UK) | 7-inch | November 1972 |
| "Dr. Who" | Mankind | Pinnacle (UK) | 7-inch, 12-inch | 25 November 1978 |
| "Doctor Who is Gonna Fix It" | Bullamakanka | RCL Records (Australia), BBC / Gemcom (US), BBC Records (UK) | 7-inch | December 1982 |
| "Doctor in Distress" | Who Cares? | Record Shack | 7-inch, 12-inch | March 1985 |
Charity single with proceeds going to Cancer Research UK created to raise awareness of the 1985 hiatus
| "Doctorin' the Tardis" | The Timelords | KLF (UK), TVT Records (US) | 7-inch, 12-inch, cassette, CD | 23 May 1988 |
| Doctor Who: Variations on a Theme | Various | Metro Music | 12-inch, Square CD | November 1989 |
This disc consists of four versions of the Doctor Who theme, arranged by Mark Ayres, Dominic Glynn and Keff McCulloch. Reissued in 1991 by Silva Screen.
| CyberTech | Adrian Pack and Michael Fillis | Jump Cut | CD | February 1994 |
Music inspired by the series, including the Dimensions in Time version of the theme music
| CyberTech Part II - Pharos | Adrian Pack and Michael Fillis | Jump Cut | CD | July 1995 |
Music inspired by the series and the New Adventures novels
| Who is Dr Who | various | RPM | CD | 30 October 2000 |
Compilation of novelty singles and related singles from 1964–1973 produced by Mark Ayres
| Chameleon Circuit | Chameleon Circuit | DFTBA Records | CD, Download | 1 June 2009 |
| Trock On! | various | DFTBA Records | CD, Download | 6 August 2009 |
| Still Got Legs | Chameleon Circuit | DFTBA Records | CD, Download | 12 July 2011 |
| Doctor Who Theme: The Gallifrey Remixes | Dominic Glynn | No Bones Records | Digital Download | 16 June 2014 |
| Vortis - music inspired by The Web Planet | Jim Mortimore | Bandcamp | Download | 8 August 2014 |
| The Destructor Contract | Jim Mortimore | Bandcamp | Download | 27 April 2015 |
Music from the unlicensed fan-produced Audio Visuals story of the same name.
| The Ravolox Remixes | Dominic Glynn | No Bones Records | Digital Download | 18 May 2015 |
| Doctor Who: The Happiness Patrol Remixes | Dominic Glynn | No Bones Records | Digital Download | 18 September 2017 |
| Dr Who: The Sword of Orion | Jim Mortimore | Bandcamp | Download | TBA |
Music from the unlicensed fan-produced Audio Visuals story of the same name.
| The Caves | The Sevateem | Bandcamp | Digital Download | 22 May 2018 |
Rock opera based on The Caves of Androzani
| The Eleven Day Empire | Mike Dickinson | Obverse Music | CD | 2 June 2022 |
Music inspired by the Faction Paradox
| Doctor Who: The Survival Remixes | Dominic Glynn | No Bones Records | Digital Download | 24 November 2023 |

== See also ==
- Doctor Who theme music
- List of Doctor Who composers

== Notes and references ==
Notes

References

- Ayres, Mark (9 March 2002). "Doctor Who Compact Disc Catalogue".
- "CD & Cassettes". The TARDIS Library.
- "Incidental Music Discography". The Millennium Effect. Archived from the original on 5 December 2009.
