= The Doctor Who 25th Anniversary Album =

Compilation album
- Released: November 1988
- Genre: Soundtrack
- Length: 44:01
- Label: BBC Records and Tapes
- Producer: John Nathan-Turner

Doctor Who soundtrack chronology
Space Adventures – Music from 'Doctor Who' 1963–1968 (1987)	The Doctor Who 25th Anniversary Album (1988)	The Curse of Fenric (1991)

The Doctor Who 25th Anniversary Album is a 1988 compilation album of music from Doctor Who. Mainly consisting of selections of Keff McCulloch's incidental music, it also included versions of the Doctor Who theme by Delia Derbyshire, Peter Howell, Dominic Glynn and McCulloch. It was subsequently reissued in 1997 as Evolution - The Music From Dr Who on Prestige Records. However, this issue was mastered at the wrong speed, the whole album playing much too fast. It was also reissued as Music from Doctor Who by Castle Pulse in July 2002.

== Track listing ==
All tracks are written by Keff McCulloch, except where noted.

No.	Title	Stories used in	Length
1.	"TARDIS - Dr. Who" (Ron Grainer arr. Delia Derbyshire (TARDIS sound by Brian Hodgson))	1972 stereo single version	2:25
2.	"Dr. Who" (Ron Grainer arr. Keff McCulloch)	Various	0:55
3.	""Gavrok's Search"	Delta and the Bannermen	2:11
4.	"A Child's Return"	Remembrance of the Daleks	2:32
5.	"Towers el Paradiso"	Paradise Towers	2:42
6.	"Burton's Escape"	Delta and the Bannermen	1:23
7.	"Drinksmat Dawning"	Paradise Towers	1:29
8.	"Future Pleasure"	Time and the Rani	3:19
9.	"Newsreel Past"	Paradise Towers	2:52
10.	"The Sting"	Delta and the Bannermen	1:43
11.	"Dr. Who (1980)" (Ron Grainer arr. Peter Howell)	Various	2:41
12.	"Dr. Who" (Ron Grainer arr. Dominic Glynn)	The Trial of a Time Lord	2:55
13.	"8891 Royale"	Trailer for the 1988 season	1:55
14.	"The White Flag"	Delta and the Bannermen	1:44
15.	"Guards of Silence"	Paradise Towers	2:38
16.	"The Making of Pex"	Paradise Towers	1:22
17.	"Cemetery Chase"	Remembrance of the Daleks	2:25
18.	"The Brain"	Time and the Rani	3:03
19.	"Here's to the Future"" (featuring the Lorells)	Delta and the Bannermen	1:58
20.	"Goodbye Doctor"	Paradise Towers	0:35
21.	"Dr. Who" (Ron Grainer arr. Keff McCulloch)	Various	1:24

== See also ==
- Doctor Who theme music
- Category:Doctor Who music
- Doctor Who Soundtrack
