= Doctor Who at the BBC Radiophonic Workshop Volume 2: New Beginnings 1970–1980 =

Compilation album by BBC Radiophonic Workshop
- Released: 2000
- Recorded: 1970–1980
- Genres: Electronic music, Sound effects
- Length: 77:56
- Label: BBC Music
- Producer: Mark Ayres
- Compiler: Mark Ayres

BBC Radiophonic Workshop chronology
Doctor Who at the BBC Radiophonic Workshop Volume 1: The Early Years 1963–1969 (2000)	Doctor Who at the BBC Radiophonic Workshop Volume 2: New Beginnings 1970–1980 (2000)	Doctor Who at the BBC Radiophonic Workshop Volume 3: The Leisure Hive (2002)

Doctor Who soundtrack chronology
Doctor Who at the BBC Radiophonic Workshop Volume 1: The Early Years 1963–1969 (2000)	Doctor Who at the BBC Radiophonic Workshop Volume 2: New Beginnings 1970–1980 (2000)	Music from the Tenth Planet (2000)

Doctor Who at the BBC Radiophonic Workshop Volume 2: New Beginnings 1970–1980 is the second in a series of compilations of BBC Radiophonic Workshop music from Doctor Who. The album collected various incidental music from the 1970s including, for the first time, the complete Malcolm Clarke score for the 1972 serial The Sea Devils, only the second scored completely by the Radiophonic Workshop. The compilation also featured a few of Dudley Simpson's compositions as realised by Brian Hodgson, some Delia Derbyshire music as featured in Inferno, two Peter Howell demos from 1979 and a selection of Dick Mills' sound effects from the era.

== Track listing ==
Track #	Artist	Track name	Stories used in
1	Delia Derbyshire	"Doctor Who (Opening Title Theme, 1970)"	various
2	Brian Hodgson	"TARDIS Control On & Warp Transfer"	Inferno
3	Delia Derbyshire	"Blue Veils & Golden Sands"	Inferno
4	Delia Derbyshire	"The Delian Mode"	Inferno
5	Brian Hodgson	"The Master's Theme" (composed by Dudley Simpson)	The Mind of Evil
6	Brian Hodgson	"Dover Castle" (composed by Dudley Simpson)	The Mind of Evil
7	Brian Hodgson	"Keller Machine Appears / Vanishes"	The Mind of Evil
8	Brian Hodgson	"Keller Machine Theme" (composed by Dudley Simpson)	The Mind of Evil
9	Brian Hodgson	"Brain Centre Atmosphere"	The Claws of Axos
10	Brian Hodgson	"The Axons Approach" (composed by Dudley Simpson)	The Claws of Axos
11	Brian Hodgson	"TARDIS Lands"	The Claws of Axos
12	Delia Derbyshire	"Doctor Who (Closing Title Theme, 1970)"	various
13	Malcolm Clarke	"The Prison"	The Sea Devils
14	Malcolm Clarke	"The Master"	The Sea Devils
15	Malcolm Clarke	"The Naval Base"	The Sea Devils
16	Malcolm Clarke	"The Sea Fort"	The Sea Devils
17	Malcolm Clarke	"Stranded"	The Sea Devils
18	Malcolm Clarke	"The Sea Devil"	The Sea Devils
19	Malcolm Clarke	"The Master at Large"	The Sea Devils
20	Malcolm Clarke	"Air-Conditioning Problem"	The Sea Devils
21	Malcolm Clarke	"Duel"	The Sea Devils
22	Malcolm Clarke	"The Master's Plan"	The Sea Devils
23	Malcolm Clarke	"The Submarine"	The Sea Devils
24	Malcolm Clarke	"Jo Frees the Doctor"	The Sea Devils
25	Malcolm Clarke	"Rock Bottom"	The Sea Devils
26	Malcolm Clarke	"The Beach"	The Sea Devils
27	Malcolm Clarke	"The Minefield"	The Sea Devils
28	Malcolm Clarke	"Devil Underwater"	The Sea Devils
29	Malcolm Clarke	"The Doctor and Jo on the Run"	The Sea Devils
30	Malcolm Clarke	"The Sea Devils Take the Prison"	The Sea Devils
31	Malcolm Clarke	"The Diving-Bell"	The Sea Devils
32	Malcolm Clarke	"Mr Walker's War"	The Sea Devils
33	Malcolm Clarke	"Torpedo"	The Sea Devils
34	Malcolm Clarke	"Attack in Force"	The Sea Devils
35	Malcolm Clarke	"Ventilation Shaft"	The Sea Devils
36	Malcolm Clarke	"Sea Chase"	The Sea Devils
37	Malcolm Clarke	"Escape"	The Sea Devils
38	Delia Derbyshire	"Doctor Who (Stereo Version, 1972)"	single release
39	Delia Derbyshire & Brian Hodgson with Paddy Kingsland	"Doctor Who (Delaware Version, 1972)"	—N/a
40	Dick Mills	"Aggedor's Temple Atmosphere, Peladon"	The Monster of Peladon (sound effects)
41	Dick Mills	"Metebelis III Atmosphere"	Planet of the Spiders (sound effects)
42	Dick Mills	"Nerva Beacon Infrastructure & T-Mat Couch"	The Ark in Space (sound effects)
43	Dick Mills	"The Planet Karn"	The Brain of Morbius (sound effects)
44	Dick Mills	"The Shrine of the Sisterhood of Karn"	The Brain of Morbius (sound effects)
45	Dick Mills	"The Mandragora Helix"	The Masque of Mandragora (sound effects)
46	Dick Mills	"Nova Device Countdown & Explosion"	Destiny of the Daleks (sound effects)
47	Peter Howell	"Demo 1"	1979 demos for The Horns of Nimon
48	Peter Howell	"Demo 2"	1979 demos for The Horns of Nimon
49	Peter Howell	"Doctor Who (New Theme, 1980)"	various

== Reception ==
In his review for Notes, Louis Niebur wrote that "the second volume, with the inclusion of Malcolm Clarke's The Sea Devils score, as well as selections from three other stories ... contrasted to Clarke's anarchic score, Dudley Simpson's music for The Mind of Evil and The Claws of Axos show what happens when the synthesizer is treated as just another orchestral instrument. Simpson was to become the primary composer for the program throughout the 1970s, but his decision in the early 1970s to 'perform' his music entirely on the EMS VCS3, leads on this recording to some hilariously dated sounds, a frequent problem with early analog synthesizer music, and his are among the least successful tracks on this CD. By 1972, Simpson had begun composing for traditional instruments in combination with electronics provided by Brian Hodgson and Dick Mills of the Radiophonic Workshop, an arrangement that lasted nearly seven years. At the end of the decade the Doctor Who production team was looking to change the sound of the program again and asked if the Radiophonic Workshop could start providing them with entirely electronic scores on a full time basis."

== See also ==
- Music from the BBC Radiophonic Workshop
- List of Doctor Who music releases
