= Doctor Who: 30 Years at the BBC Radiophonic Workshop =

Compilation album by BBC Radiophonic Workshop
- Released: 5 July 1993
- Recorded: 1963–1989, 1993
- Genres: Electronic music, Sound effects
- Length: 69:49
- Label: BBC Enterprises

BBC Radiophonic Workshop chronology
Doctor Who – The Music II (1985)	Doctor Who: 30 Years at the BBC Radiophonic Workshop (1993)	Doctor Who at the BBC Radiophonic Workshop Volume 1: The Early Years 1963–1969 (2000)

Doctor Who soundtrack chronology
Pyramids of Mars (1993)	30 Years at the BBC Radiophonic Workshop (1993)	The Worlds of Doctor Who (1994)

Alternative cover

Doctor Who: 30 Years at the BBC Radiophonic Workshop is a 1993 album celebrating the 30th anniversary of popular BBC science-fiction series Doctor Who, which had been taken off the air four years previous. The compilation featured a selection of sound-effects and atmospheres from throughout the history of the programme as well as a sample of music from the 1993 BBC Radio production "The Paradise of Death". It also collected four versions of the memorable theme music, including the first official release of the unused 1972 "Delaware" version.

== Track listing ==
Track #	Artist	Track name	Stories used in
1	Delia Derbyshire	"Original Theme"	Various
2	Brian Hodgson	"TARDIS Exterior"	Various
3	Brian Hodgson	"TARDIS Take-off"	Various
4	Brian Hodgson	"Sensorites In Laboratory"	The Sensorites
5	Brian Hodgson	"Slyther on the Move"	The Dalek Invasion of Earth
6	Brian Hodgson	"Death Of A Mirebeast"	The Chase
7	Brian Hodgson	"Mechanoid"	The Chase
8	Brian Hodgson	"Dalek Spaceship Takes Off"	The Chase
9	Brian Hodgson	"Dalek Spaceship Lands"	The Chase
10	Brian Hodgson	"Chumblie Constant Run"	Galaxy 4
11	Brian Hodgson	"Chumblie At Rest"	Galaxy 4
12	Brian Hodgson	"Chumblie Dies"	Galaxy 4
13	Brian Hodgson	"Few Fishpeople"	The Underwater Menace
14	Delia Derbyshire	"Signature Tune – A New Beginning"	Various
15	Brian Hodgson	"Propaganda Sleep Machine"	The Macra Terror
16	Brian Hodgson	"Macra Control and Macra"	The Macra Terror
17	Brian Hodgson	"Destruction of the Daleks"	The Evil of the Daleks
18	Brian Hodgson	"Cobweb Mutates"	The Web of Fear
19	Brian Hodgson	"Yeti Growls, Roars and Dies"	The Web of Fear
20	Brian Hodgson	"Four Yetis Signalling"	The Web of Fear
21	Brian Hodgson	"Cybermats Attracter to Ship"	The Wheel in Space
22	Brian Hodgson	"Start of the Cyber Invasion"	The Wheel in Space
23	Brian Hodgson	"Birth of the Cybermats"	The Wheel in Space
24	Brian Hodgson	"Cybermat Killed by Special Sound"	The Wheel in Space
25	Brian Hodgson	"Quarks Chuckle"	The Dominators
26	Brian Hodgson	"Quark Kills"	The Dominators
27	Brian Hodgson	"Quark Goes Berserk and Explodes"	The Dominators
28	Brian Hodgson	"Kroton Theme with Birth and Death of a Kroton"	The Krotons
29	Brian Hodgson	"Original Sonic Screwdriver"	The War Games
30	Brian Hodgson	"Time Zone"	The War Games
31	Brian Hodgson	"Sidrat Control"	The War Games
32	Brian Hodgson	"Factory with Mechanical and Physiological Autons and Auton guns"	Spearhead from Space
33	Delia Derbyshire & Brian Hodgson with Paddy Kingsland	"Signature Tune (The Delaware Version)"	Never used in the series
34	Brian Hodgson	"TARDIS Lands"	Various
35	Dick Mills	"Threat to Sarah"	The Sontaran Experiment
36	Dick Mills	"Sonic Screwdriver (Multi-Purpose Mode)"	Various
37	Dick Mills	"Wirrn in the Infrastructure"	The Ark in Space
38	Dick Mills	"Void"	The Masque of Mandragora
39	Dick Mills	"Shuttle Landing Sequence"	The Invisible Enemy
40	Dick Mills	"Fendahl Shuffle and Slobber"	Image of the Fendahl
41	Dick Mills	"Vardan Materialises and Shimmers"	The Invasion of Time
42	Dick Mills	"K9 Probe and Gun"	The Invasion of Time
43	Dick Mills	"TARDIS Doors"	The Invasion of Time
44	Dick Mills	"White Guardian's Windbells"	The Ribos Operation
45	Elizabeth Parker	"An Ogri About"	The Stones of Blood
46	Elizabeth Parker	"Pouring Crystals"	The Stones of Blood
47	Dick Mills	"Attack on War Room"	The Armageddon Factor
48	Dick Mills	"Doctor's Repair to TARDIS' Central Column Fails"	The Horns of Nimon
49	Dick Mills	"Foamasi Voices"	The Leisure Hive
50	Dick Mills	"Doors"	Meglos
51	Dick Mills	"Reactivation and Laboratory Rises"	Meglos
52	Dick Mills	"Dodecahedron Beams"	Meglos
53	Dick Mills	"Marshmen Emerge from the Mistfall"	Full Circle
54	Dick Mills	"Timewinds"	Warriors' Gate
55	Dick Mills	"TARDIS Landing Bleep"	Various
56	Dick Mills	"Cloister Bell"	Castrovalva
57	Dick Mills	"March of the Victims"	Terminus
58	Dick Mills	"Search, Capture and Display Dolls"	"The Five Doctors"
59	Dick Mills	"Scrolls Self-Destruct"	"The Five Doctors"
60	Dick Mills	"Borusa Destroyed"	"The Five Doctors"
61	Dick Mills	"Myrka Passes"	Warriors of the Deep
62	Dick Mills	"Sea-Devils Energising Chamber inside Silurian Rock"	Warriors of the Deep
63	Dick Mills	"Exploding River of Mud"	The Caves of Androzani
64	Elizabeth Parker	"Timelash Music Suite"	Timelash
65	Dick Mills	"Tissue Compression Eliminator"	The Trial of a Time Lord
66	Dick Mills	"Limbo Atrophier"	The Trial of a Time Lord
67	Dick Mills	"Drinks Machine"	Paradise Towers
68	Dick Mills	"Transformer Machine"	Delta and the Bannermen
69	Dick Mills	"Sonic Cone Switch On and Detonate"	Delta and the Bannermen
70	Dick Mills	"Bees"	Delta and the Bannermen
71	Dick Mills	"Singing Trees with Dragon Shots and Two Nitro-9 Bombs"	Dragonfire
72	Dick Mills	"Confuser Machine"	Remembrance of the Daleks
73	Dick Mills	"Baseball Bat Hits Daleks"	Remembrance of the Daleks
74	Dick Mills	"Big Dalek Gun"	Remembrance of the Daleks
75	Dick Mills	"Doctor In Time Tunnel"	The Greatest Show in the Galaxy
76	Dick Mills	"Cybership Lands, Doors Open"	Silver Nemesis
77	Dick Mills	"Statue"	Silver Nemesis
78	Dick Mills	"Execution Sequence"	The Happiness Patrol
79	Dick Mills	"Letters Burnt On Crypt Wall"	The Curse of Fenric
80	Dick Mills	"Phial Breaks, Gas Escapes"	The Curse of Fenric
81	Dick Mills	"Energy Bursts"	Battlefield
82	Dick Mills	"Bessie Drives Off"	Battlefield
83	Dick Mills	"Transmaterialisation"	Survival
84	Dick Mills	"Light Petrifies Victims"	Ghost Light
85	Dick Mills	"Bird Nightmare"	Ghost Light
86	Dick Mills	"Sphere"	Shada
87	Peter Howell	"Paradise of Death"	The Paradise of Death
88	Peter Howell	"Closing Theme"	Various
