= List of Doctor Who composers =

This is a list of composers for science fiction television series Doctor Who. It is sortable by a number of different criteria. The list defaults to ascending alphabetical order the composer's last name.

== History ==
The Doctor Who theme music was composed by Ron Grainer and initially arranged by Delia Derbyshire of the BBC Radiophonic Workshop. Various composers subsequently arranged it for later versions of the theme.

In the classic series, each serial's director chose the freelance composer for the incidental music in the serial. Some directors chose to use stock music or special soundscapes from the Radiophonic Workshop instead of specially composed music as a cost cutting measure. During the 1970s, the incidental composer primarily associated with the programme was Dudley Simpson, composing most of the decade's music. When John Nathan-Turner became producer of Doctor Who in 1980, he decided that the music needed to be updated, and took Simpson out for a meal telling him how much he appreciated his work on Doctor Who but that it would no longer be required as he intended to have the BBC Radiophonic Workshop provide music from that point. While Simpson was contracted to score Shada, the unfinished nature of that production meant he never started work. As a result, his last broadcast work on Doctor Who was for The Horns of Nimon.

The 1980s saw the music composition brought in house at the BBC by various members of the Radiophonic Workshop, before transitioning back to freelance composers at the end of the original series's run. This decade saw a more heavy use of synthesizers than before.

John Debney was chosen to score the 1996 TV movie, and he achieved this together with his proteges Louis Febre and John Sponsler.

The revived series' scores were entirely composed by Murray Gold for the first ten series. Gold utilised a score created with first with orchestral samples for Series 1, and later with the BBC National Orchestra of Wales from Series 2 onwards. He heavily used of leitmotifs for characters such as the Doctor, the companions and monsters. Gold's music was played at the Proms, such as for the 50th anniversary celebration. Several singers performed in the soundtracks of these series, for instance, Tim Phillips in "Song for Ten". (Neil Hannon performed the vocals for the soundtrack album version.) However, the programme had previously had a singers - The Gunfighters featured Lynda Baron singing "The Ballad of the Last Chance Saloon" composed by Tristram Cary in 1966 and Delta and the Bannermen featured "The Lorells", a fictional group created by the show's incidental music composer Keff McCulloch in 1987.

Segun Akinola replaced Gold for the duration of the Thirteenth Doctor's run. Akinola's scores tended to be more ambient than Gold's, with a great variety of instruments for different episodes.

In April 2023, it was announced that Gold would again join Doctor Who as composer.

== Doctor Who composers ==
Composer	No. stories	First date	First story	Last date	Last story
Segun Akinola	24	2018	"The Woman Who Fell to Earth"	2022	"The Power of the Doctor"
Mark Ayres (Note: Also composed music for the 2017 version of Shada and additional music for the 2023 colourised version of The Daleks)	3	1988	The Greatest Show in the Galaxy	1989	The Curse of Fenric
Richard Rodney Bennett	1	1964	The Aztecs	1964	The Aztecs
Carey Blyton	3	1970	Doctor Who and the Silurians	1975	Revenge of the Cybermen
Charles Botterill (Note: Botterill performed eight minutes of percussive music for the score, with the rest from stock.)	1	1965	The Time Meddler	1965	The Time Meddler
Geoffrey Burgon	2	1975	Terror of the Zygons	1976	The Seeds of Doom
Tristram Cary (Note: Three serials credited to Cary (The Rescue, The Ark, and The Power of the Daleks) just reuse music originally recorded for The Daleks or The Daleks' Master Plan with no new music.)	8	1963	The Daleks	1972	The Mutants
Francis Chagrin	1	1964	The Dalek Invasion of Earth	1964	The Dalek Invasion of Earth
Malcolm Clarke (Note: Composed as part of the BBC Radiophonic Workshop)	7	1972	The Sea Devils	1986	Terror of the Vervoids
John Debney	1	1996	Doctor Who	1996	Doctor Who
Louis Febre	1	1996	Doctor Who	1996	Doctor Who
Jonathan Gibbs	4	1983	The King's Demons	1985	The Mark of the Rani
Dominic Glynn	5	1986	The Mysterious Planet	1989	Survival
Murray Gold	139	2005	"Rose"	2025	"The Reality War"
Don Harper	1	1968	The Invasion	1968	The Invasion
Richard Hartley	1	1986	Mindwarp	1986	Mindwarp
Brian Hodgson (Note: Effectively scored four serials (The Wheel in Space, The Dominators, The Mind Robber, and The Krotons) under the credit of "Special Sound" and is named on the music cue sheets for The Invasion alongside Don Harper.)	5	1968	The Wheel in Space	1969	The Krotons
Peter Howell (Note: Also provided uncredited incidental music for Revenge of the Cybermen.)	9	1980	The Leisure Hive	1985	The Two Doctors
Raymond Jones	2	1965	The Romans	1966	The Savages
Norman Kay	3	1963	An Unearthly Child	1964	The Sensorites
Paddy Kingsland (Note: Kingsland's last two scores (Mawdryn Undead and Frontios) were composed freelance after he left the Radiophonic Workshop)	8	1980	Meglos	1984	Frontios
Roger Limb	8	1981	The Keeper of Traken	1985	Revelation of the Daleks
Keff McCulloch (Note: Also composed music for the 1992 video release of Shada and the 1993 charity special Dimensions in Time)	6	1987	Time and the Rani	1989	Battlefield
Stanley Myers	1	1964	The Reign of Terror	1964	The Reign of Terror
Elizabeth Parker	1	1985	Timelash	1985	Timelash
Humphrey Searle	1	1965	The Myth Makers	1965	The Myth Makers
Dudley Simpson	62	1964	Planet of Giants	1980	The Horns of Nimon
John Sponsler	1	1996	Doctor Who	1996	Doctor Who

== Stock music ==
Instead of using specially composed music, some serials were scored completely with pre-recorded stock music. Some of these serials used music by one composer as noted below:

- The Edge of Destruction
- The Web Planet - Music by Les Structures Sonores
- The Space Museum
- Galaxy 4 - Music by Les Structures Sonores
- Mission to the Unknown - Music by Trevor Duncan
- The Massacre of St Bartholomew's Eve - Music by Pierre Arvay
- The War Machines
- The Tenth Planet
- The Highlanders
- The Moonbase
- The Faceless Ones
- The Tomb of the Cybermen
- The Enemy of the World - Music by Béla Bartók
- The Web of Fear
- Inferno

== Spinoff composers ==
Composer	Spinoff title(s)
Mark Ayres	Wartime, Shakedown: Return of the Sontarans, P.R.O.B.E. (The Zero Imperative, The Devil of Winterborne, Unnatural Selection, Ghosts of Winterborne)
Lorne Balfe	The War Between the Land and the Sea
Nicholas Briggs	Mindgame, Mindgame Trilogy
Edmund Butt	An Adventure in Space and Time
Christopher Elves	K9
Ben Foster	Torchwood
Alan Glass	White Witch of Devil's End
Linzi Gold	White Witch of Devil's End
Murray Gold	The Sarah Jane Adventures (theme tune), Torchwood (theme tune and incidental music)
Barry Gray	Dr. Who and the Daleks, Daleks' Invasion Earth 2150 A.D.
Peter Howell	K-9 and Company, also arranged the theme tune
Erwin Keiles	Downtime
Ian Levine	K-9 and Company (theme tune), Downtime
Michael Lira	K9 (theme tune)
Alistair Lock	Auton Trilogy, Dæmos Rising, Zygon: When Being You Just Isn't Enough, Sil and the Devil Seeds of Arodor
Malcolm Lockyer	Dr. Who and the Daleks
Bill McGuffie	Daleks' Invasion Earth 2150 A.D.
Blair Mowat	Class
Nigel Stock	Downtime
Olivia Thomas	P.R.O.B.E. (When to Die)
Fiachra Trench	K-9 and Company (theme tune)
Dan Watts	The Sarah Jane Adventures
Sam Watts	The Sarah Jane Adventures, Tales of the TARDIS
