= Newfangle =

- Genre: Sitcom
- Running time: 30 minutes
- Country of origin: United Kingdom
- Language: English
- Home station: BBC Radio 4
- Starring: Russell Tovey; Maureen Lipman; Gabriel Vick; Hugh Bonneville; Pippa Evans; Amy Shindler
- Written by: Adam Rosenthal; Viv Ambrose
- Produced by: Adam Bromley
- Recording studio: The Soundhouse, London
- Original release: 1 June – 6 July 2009
- No. of series: 1
- No. of episodes: 6
- Website: Above the Title (Production company)

Newfangle is a BBC Radio 4 sitcom written by Adam Rosenthal and Viv Ambrose, first broadcast on 1 June 2009. The series is set hundreds of thousands of years ago amongst a tribe of proto-humans. Newfangle (played by Russell Tovey), is a low status member of his tribe who tries to improve his status in the tribe by coming up with new inventions such as language, fire and money. However, all of his inventions are stolen by the tribe's alpha male, Alf (Hugh Bonneville).

== Plot ==
Newfangle is a low status member of an early tribe of proto-humans living hundreds of thousands of years ago. What time exactly is unknown and different times are given on different websites. The BBC website says it takes place in 100,000 B.C., while an earlier statement from the BBC Press Office said it was set, "hundreds of thousands of years ago", and the website for the show's production company, Above the Title Productions, claims it is set two million years ago.

Newfangle's father, Fangle, was the alpha male before he was ambushed and killed by the current alpha male Alf. Newfangle tries to constantly improve his position in the tribe by inventing new things such as language, warfare and music. However, Alf constantly steals Newfangle's ideas in order to keep his position.

Newfangle also tries to use his ideas to impress other members of the tribe, especially a female he is in love with, Snaggle (Pippa Evans) but his ideas tend to fail rather than impress. Although, in the last episode, she confesses her love for Newfangle to the Voice in the Tree-Stump (unaware it is Newfangle) He also tries to impress his mother Coco (Maureen Lipman), but she considers him to be weak and places more confidence in Newfangle's half-brother Crag (Gabriel Vick).

== Reception ==
Newfangle received positive reviews. Gillian Reynolds from the Daily Telegraph described it as a, "Thoughtful, inventive comedy", adding, "Soon prehistory turns out to quite a lot like life anywhere, anytime. But funnier."

Frances Lass from the Radio Times also praised the programme saying that:

"I love this. I love everything about it - from Russell Tovey's aping of the lowly hominid of the title who invents language to express his unrequited love and his protests about always being beaten up by the alpha male, to Adam Rosenthal and Viv Ambrose's gloriously scrumptious and clever script. Set in the primordial mud, a group of apes on the brink of evolving into humans grapple with those things that progress entails. And yet, their hierarchies and obsessions seem awfully familiar and modern. Probably coming to a TV series near you. Og me if it doesn't!"

== Episodes ==
No.	Title	Original release date
1	"Insult to Injury"	1 June 2009
Newfangle invents language in the hope it will improve his standing, but soon finds the system is open to abuse from gossip, lies, slang and swearing.
2	"Changing Tunes"	8 June 2009
Alf orders the tribe to make him a giant mound. While making it, Newfangle makes a rhythm by hitting pieces of flint together and thus he invents music.
3	"Grows on Trees"	15 June 2009
Newfangle and Crag discover the piles of mud shaped like shelters help to protect the tribe from the heat. They become so popular that Newfangle tries to cash in by inventing a system of payment to use them.
4	"Bright Ideas"	22 June 2009
Newfangle is forced by Alf to come up with a new invention for the annual feast because of the alpha male's recent hunting disasters. A lightning strike results in his latest discovery - fire.
5	"Sticks and Stones"	29 June 2009
Newfangle's latest invention, diplomacy, fails when Alf upsets another tribe. Newfangle is then forced to come up with a new weapon to help win the war.
6	"Trees in the Forest"	6 July 2009
Newfangle offends the elders of the tribe and hides away to avoid being savaged to death. While in hiding, he discovers his words carry a new power.
