= Doctor Who at the BBC Radiophonic Workshop Volume 1: The Early Years 1963–1969 =

Compilation album by BBC Radiophonic Workshop
- Released: 2000
- Recorded: 1963–1969
- Genre: Electronic music, Sound effects
- Length: 77:56
- Label: BBC Music
- Producer: Mark Ayres
- Compiler: Mark Ayres

BBC Radiophonic Workshop chronology
Doctor Who: 30 Years at the BBC Radiophonic Workshop (1993)	Doctor Who at the BBC Radiophonic Workshop Volume 1: The Early Years 1963–1969 (2000)	Doctor Who at the BBC Radiophonic Workshop Volume 2: New Beginnings 1970–1980 (2000)

Doctor Who soundtrack chronology
Terror of the Zygons (2000)	Doctor Who at the BBC Radiophonic Workshop Volume 1: The Early Years 1963–1969 (2000)	Doctor Who at the BBC Radiophonic Workshop Volume 2: New Beginnings 1970–1980 (2000)

Doctor Who at the BBC Radiophonic Workshop Volume 1: The Early Years 1963–1969 is the first in a series of compilations of Doctor Who material recorded by the BBC Radiophonic Workshop. Compiled and remastered by Mark Ayres, the album features mostly sound effects and atmospheres from the first six years of the programme. Although some incidental music tracks do appear, most of the album's content is by original Doctor Who sound effects creator Brian Hodgson. The compilation also features three Radiophonic Workshop realisations of early Doctor Who composer Dudley Simpson's work.

The compilation was the first release of Radiophonic Workshop material following the department's closure and was intended by archiver Ayres to be the beginning of a series covering the varied output of the department. The series was to have included material from other children's programmes such as Roger Limb's score from The Box of Delights as well as music from documentaries and radio, although only material related to Doctor Who has so far been released.

== Track listing ==
Track #	Artist	Track name	Stories used in
1	Delia Derbyshire	"Doctor Who (Original Theme)"	—
2	Brian Hodgson	"TARDIS Exterior Hum and Door (Original)"	"An Unearthly Child" (Pilot)
3	Brian Hodgson	"Entry Into The TARDIS"	"An Unearthly Child" (Pilot)
4	Brian Hodgson	"TARDIS Original Takeoff Sequence"	"An Unearthly Child" (Pilot)
5	Delia Derbyshire	"Doctor Who (Original Titles Music)"	various
6	Brian Hodgson	"TARDIS Takeoff"	An Unearthly Child
7	Brian Hodgson	"Skaro; Petrified Forest Atmosphere ('Thal Wind')"	The Daleks
8	Brian Hodgson	"TARDIS Computer"	The Daleks
9	Brian Hodgson	"Dalek City Corridor"	The Daleks
10	Brian Hodgson	"Dalek Control Room"	The Daleks
11	Brian Hodgson	"Capsule Oscillation (Dalek Destructor Fuse - Bomb Countdown"	The Daleks
12	Brian Hodgson	"Explosion, TARDIS Stops"	The Edge of Destruction
13	Brian Hodgson	"Sleeping Machine"	The Keys of Marinus
14	Brian Hodgson	"Sensorite Speech Background"	The Sensorites
15	Brian Hodgson	"Dalek Spaceship Lands"	The Chase
16	Brian Hodgson	"TARDIS Lands"	The Chase
17	Brian Hodgson	"Chumblie (Constant Run)"	Galaxy 4
18	Brian Hodgson	"Chumblie At Rest"	Galaxy 4
19	Brian Hodgson	"Chumblie Sends Message"	Galaxy 4
20	Brian Hodgson	"Chumblie Dome (Rises-Falls-Rises-Falls)"	Galaxy 4
21	Brian Hodgson	"Chumblie Dies"	Galaxy 4
22	Brian Hodgson	"Activity on Dalek Ship Control Panel"	The Daleks' Master Plan
23	Brian Hodgson	"Energy Escapes"	The Savages
24	Brian Hodgson	"Machinery in TARDIS Goes Wild (Regeneration)"	The Tenth Planet
25	Brian Hodgson & Dick Mills	"Regeneration Runs Down"	The Power of the Daleks
26	Brian Hodgson & Dick Mills	"The Doctor's Transitional Trauma"	The Power of the Daleks
27	Brian Hodgson	"The Fish People (Incidental Music)" (composed by Dudley Simpson)	The Underwater Menace
28	Brian Hodgson	"Heartbeat Chase"	The Macra Terror
29	Delia Derbyshire	"Chromophone Band" (composed by Dudley Simpson)	The Macra Terror
30	Brian Hodgson	"Controller Chimes"	The Macra Terror
31	John Baker	"Musak (From Time in Advance)"	The Macra Terror
32	Brian Hodgson	"Propaganda Sleep Machine"	The Macra Terror
33	Delia Derbyshire	Doctor Who (New Opening Theme, 1967)	Various
34	Brian Hodgson	"Sting & Web (Cocooning Interior) - Cobweb Pulsates"	The Web of Fear
35	Brian Hodgson	"Four Stings"	The Web of Fear
36	Brian Hodgson	"Mr Oak and Mr Quill" (Incidental Music) (composed by Dudley Simpson)	Fury from the Deep
37	Brian Hodgson	"Lead-in to Cyber Planner"	The Wheel in Space
38	Brian Hodgson	"Cyber Planner Background"	The Wheel in Space
39	Brian Hodgson	"Cyberman Stab & Music"	The Wheel in Space
40	Brian Hodgson	"Rocket Stab"	The Wheel in Space
41	Brian Hodgson	"Birth Of Cybermats"	The Wheel in Space
42	Brian Hodgson	"Cybermats Attracted to Wheel"	The Wheel in Space
43	Brian Hodgson	"Rocket In Space"	The Wheel in Space
44	Brian Hodgson	"Interior Rocket (Suspense Music)"	The Wheel in Space
45	Brian Hodgson	"Servo Robot Music"	The Wheel in Space
46	Brian Hodgson	"Wheel Stab"	The Wheel in Space
47	Brian Hodgson	"Cosmos Atmosphere"	The Wheel in Space
48	Brian Hodgson	"Alien Ship Music"	The Wheel in Space
49	Brian Hodgson	"Jarvis in a Dream State"	The Wheel in Space
50	Brian Hodgson	"Floating Through Space"	The Wheel in Space
51	Brian Hodgson	"2 Stabs"	The Wheel in Space
52	Brian Hodgson	"TARDIS (New Landing)"	The Dominators
53	Brian Hodgson	"Galaxy Atmosphere"	The Dominators
54	Brian Hodgson	"Tension Builder (a)"	The Dominators
55	Brian Hodgson	"Tension Builder (b)"	The Dominators
56	Brian Hodgson	"Tension Builder (c)"	The Dominators
57	Brian Hodgson	"Low Sting"	The Dominators
58	Brian Hodgson	"TARDIS; Extra Power Unit Plugged In"	The Mind Robber
59	Brian Hodgson	"Zoe's Theme"	The Mind Robber
60	Brian Hodgson	"White Void"	The Mind Robber
61	John Baker	"Musak (From Time in Advance)"	The Mind Robber
62	Brian Hodgson	"Cybermen Brought to Life"	The Invasion
63	Brian Hodgson	"Cyber Invasion"	The Invasion
64	Brian Hodgson	"The Learning Hall"	The Krotons
65	Brian Hodgson	"Entry Into The Machine"	The Krotons
66	Brian Hodgson	"Sting"	The Krotons
67	Brian Hodgson	"Machine and City Theme"	The Krotons
68	Brian Hodgson	"Kroton Theme"	The Krotons
69	Brian Hodgson	"TARDIS Land"	The Space Pirates
70	Brian Hodgson	"Alien Control Centre"	The War Games
71	Brian Hodgson	"Time Zone Atmosphere"	The War Games
72	Brian Hodgson	"Dimensional Control (SIDRAT Dimensions Contract)"	The War Games
73	Brian Hodgson	"War Lord Arrival"	The War Games
74	Brian Hodgson	"Silver Box (The Doctor Calls For Help)"	The War Games
75	Brian Hodgson	"Time Lord Court Atmosphere"	The War Games
76	Delia Derbyshire	"Doctor Who (Closing Titles)"	Various
