= Doctor Who: The Music II =

Compilation album by BBC Radiophonic Workshop
- Released: 1985
- Recorded: 1983–1984
- Genre: Electronic music
- Length: 44:36
- Label: BBC Records
- Producer: Dick Mills

BBC Radiophonic Workshop chronology
The Living Planet - Music from the BBC TV Series (1984)	Doctor Who: The Music II (1985)	Doctor Who: 30 Years at the BBC Radiophonic Workshop (1993)

Doctor Who soundtrack chronology
The Music (1983)	The Music II (1985)	Space Adventures – Music from 'Doctor Who' 1963–1968 (1987)

"The Five Doctors" cover

Doctor Who: The Music II is a 1985 BBC Records album which is a sequel to Doctor Who: The Music released in 1983. Once again, it featured a selection of BBC Radiophonic Workshop music from the popular series. The compilation was made up of material recorded since its predecessor, including music from Workshop newcomer Jonathan Gibbs. As with the first album, the music was reassembled into short suites and remixed into stereo with added sound effects. It was re-released in 1992 on Silva Screen, with bonus tracks, as The Five Doctors - Classic Music From The BBC Radiophonic Workshop Volume 2. Selections from both Doctor Who - The Music albums were also re-used on the 1994 Silva Screen compilation The Best Of Doctor Who Volume 1 - The Five Doctors.

== Track listing ==
=== Original 1985 track listing ===
Side One
No.	Title	Writer(s)	Length
1.	"The Five Doctors"	Peter Howell
2.	"The King's Demons""	Jonathan Gibbs
3.	"Enlightenment"	Malcolm Clarke

Side Two
No.	Title	Writer(s)	Length
1.	"Warriors of the Deep"	Jonathan Gibbs
2.	"The Awakening"	Peter Howell
3.	"Resurrection of the Daleks"	Malcolm Clarke
4.	"Planet of Fire"	Peter Howell
5.	"The Caves of Androzani"	Roger Limb

=== 1992 "The Five Doctors" track listing ===
No.	Title	Writer(s)	Length
1.	"Doctor Who"	Ron Grainer arr. Peter Howell
2.	"Enlightenment"	Malcolm Clarke
3.	"The King's Demons"	Jonathan Gibbs
4.	"The Five Doctors"	Peter Howell
5.	"Warriors of the Deep"	Jonathan Gibbs
6.	"The Awakening"	Peter Howell
7.	"Resurrection of the Daleks"	Malcolm Clarke
8.	"Planet of Fire"	Peter Howell
9.	"The Caves of Androzani"	Roger Limb
10.	"Doctor Who (Reprise)"	Ron Grainer arr. Peter Howell
