= Forthcoming =

Forthcoming may refer to:

- "Forthcoming", a song from the 1992 album Atmos, composed by Miroslav Vitous and performed by Jan Garbarek
- "Forthcoming", a song from the 1997 album Care in the Community by Monk & Canatella
- "Forthcoming", a song from the 1999 album Protechtion by Adam Beyer
- Forthcoming, a 2000 book by Jalal Toufic

== See also ==
- Fourthcoming, a 2009 album by FourPlay String Quartet
