= The Machine that Changed the World =

The Machine that Changed the World may refer to:

- The Machine That Changed the World (book), book by Jim Womack, Dan Jones, and Daniel Roos, about the automobile
- The Machine That Changed the World (miniseries), a five-part television show on electronic digital computers
