= Doctor Who: The Music =

1983 compilation album by the BBC Radiophonic Workshop

Compilation album by BBC Radiophonic Workshop
- Released: 1983
- Recorded: 1963, 1972, 1980–1983
- Genre: Electronic music
- Length: 40:24 / 51:24
- Label: BBC Records
- Producer: Dick Mills
- Compiler: Dick Mills

BBC Radiophonic Workshop chronology
BBC Sound Effects No. 26 - Sci-Fi Sound Effects (1981)	Doctor Who: The Music (1983)	The Soundhouse (1983)

Doctor Who soundtrack chronology
BBC Sound Effects No. 26 - Sci-Fi Sound Effects (1981)	The Music (1983)	The Music II (1985)

Earthshock cover

Doctor Who: The Music is a 1983 compilation of music from the BBC Radiophonic Workshop featuring incidental music from the popular science-fiction television series Doctor Who. The album was the first full-length to feature solely music from the programme. The collection was produced by Workshop member and long-time Doctor Who sound-effects creator Dick Mills. It featured the original Delia Derbyshire arrangement of Ron Grainer's theme tune and music by Malcolm Clarke from the 1972 serial "The Sea Devils", which was only the second to have an incidental score provided completely by the Radiophonic Workshop. Most of the music included came from serials from the previous three years to demonstrate the recent composers' works. For the album, each serial's incidental music was reassembled into short "suites" and although most of the music had been recorded in mono it was, for this compilation, remixed into stereo with sound effects added on to some tracks. The album was re-released in 1992 by Silva Screen records as Earthshock - Classic Music From The BBC Radiophonic Workshop Volume 1, with bonus tracks including "The Worlds of Doctor Who", a track recorded by Mills as a B-side to Dudley Simpson's 1973 "Moonbase 3" single, which featured a mix of music with sound effects from Planet of the Daleks before following with Simpson's "Master's Theme" and finishing with music from the serial The Mind of Evil . Selections from both this compilation and its follow-up, Doctor Who: The Music II, were also re-used on the 1994 Silva Screen compilation The Best of Doctor Who Volume 1: The Five Doctors.

== Track listing ==
=== Original 1983 track listing ===
Track #	Artist	Track name	Stories used in
Side One
1	Delia Derbyshire	"TARDIS - Doctor Who" (Note: Special Sound by Brian Hodgson)	—
2	Malcolm Clarke	"The Sea Devils"	The Sea Devils
3	Peter Howell	"Meglos" (Note: Special Sound by Dick Mills)	Meglos
4	Roger Limb	"Nyssa's Theme"	The Keeper of Traken
5	Roger Limb	"Kassia's Wedding Music"	The Keeper of Traken
6	Roger Limb	"The Threat of Melkur"	The Keeper of Traken
7	Roger Limb	"Exploring the Lab"	Four to Doomsday
8	Roger Limb	"Nyssa is Hypnotized"	Four to Doomsday
9	Peter Howell	"The Leisure Hive"	The Leisure Hive
Side Two
1	Roger Limb	"Omega Field Force"	Arc of Infinity
2	Roger Limb	"Ergon Threat"	Arc of Infinity
3	Roger Limb	"Termination of the Doctor"	Arc of Infinity
4	Peter Howell	"Banqueting Music"	Warriors' Gate
5	Peter Howell	"TSS Machine Attacked"	Kinda
6	Peter Howell	"Janissary Band"	Snakedance
7	Malcolm Clarke	"Subterranean Caves"	Earthshock
8	Malcolm Clarke	"Requiem"	Earthshock
9	Malcolm Clarke	"March of the Cybermen"	Earthshock
10	Peter Howell	"Doctor Who"	various

=== 1992 Earthshock track listing ===
Track #	Artist	Track name	Stories used in
1	Delia Derbyshire	"TARDIS - Doctor Who"	—
2	Malcolm Clarke	"The Sea Devils"	The Sea Devils
3	Peter Howell	"Meglos"	Meglos
4	Dick Mills (Note: composed by Dudley Simpson)	"The Worlds of Doctor Who"	—
5	Delia Derbyshire	"Blue Veils and Golden Sands"	Inferno
6	Roger Limb	"Nyssa's Theme"	The Keeper of Traken
7	Roger Limb	"Kassia's Wedding Music"	The Keeper of Traken
8	Roger Limb	"The Threat of Melkur"	The Keeper of Traken
9	Roger Limb	"Exploring the Lab"	Four to Doomsday
10	Roger Limb	"Nyssa is Hypnotized"	Four to Doomsday
11	Peter Howell	"The Leisure Hive"	The Leisure Hive
12	Delia Derbyshire	"The Delian Mode"	Inferno
13	Roger Limb	"Omega Field Force"	Arc of Infinity
14	Roger Limb	"Ergon Threat"	Arc of Infinity
15	Roger Limb	"Termination of the Doctor"	Arc of Infinity
16	Peter Howell	"Banqueting Music"	Warriors' Gate
17	Peter Howell	"TSS Machine Attacked"	Kinda
18	Peter Howell	"Janissary Band"	Snakedance
19	Malcolm Clarke	"Subterranean Caves"	Earthshock
20	Malcolm Clarke	"Requiem"	Earthshock
21	Malcolm Clarke	"March of the Cybermen"	Earthshock
22	Delia Derbyshire	"TARDIS - Doctor Who - Reprise"	—
