= The Soundhouse =

Compilation album by BBC Radiophonic Workshop
- Released: 1983
- Recorded: 1979–1983
- Genre: Electronic music
- Length: 45:42
- Label: BBC Records

BBC Radiophonic Workshop chronology
Doctor Who - The Music (1983)	The Soundhouse (1983)	The Living Planet - Music from the BBC TV Series (1984)

The Soundhouse is a 1983 compilation released by BBC Records of music from the BBC Radiophonic Workshop. It featured music composed at the Workshop in the period since the previous compilation, BBC Radiophonic Workshop - 21. During the gap between releases, many advances had been made in the use of computer technology to produce electronic music and this was reflected on the compilation with much of the material having been performed using the Fairlight CMI, the first digital sampling synthesiser. The album included two tracks by Paddy Kingsland used in the television version of The Hitchhiker's Guide to the Galaxy, three electronic realisations of classical compositions and an original collaboration featuring five of the Radiophonic Workshop members entitled "Radiophonic Rock".

== Track listing ==
1. Peter Howell, Roger Limb, Jonathan Gibbs, Elizabeth Parker & Dick Mills - "Radiophonic Rock"
2. Peter Howell - "Lascaux"
3. Jonathan Gibbs - "Computers in the Real World"
4. Dick Mills - "Seascape"
5. Paddy Kingsland - "The Whale" (from The Hitchhiker's Guide to the Galaxy)
6. Roger Limb - "Rallyman"
7. Dick Mills - "Catch the Wind"
8. Malcolm Clarke - "Believe it or Not"
9. Elizabeth Parker - "Planet Earth"
10. Jonathan Gibbs - "Dawn"
11. Peter Howell - "Mainstream" (composition attributed to Henry VIII)
12. Malcolm Clarke - "The Unseeing Eye"
13. Peter Howell & Dick Mills - "Fancy Fish" (arrangement of Camille Saint-Saëns's "Aquarium" from Le carnaval des animaux)
14. Paddy Kingsland - "Brighton Pier" (from The Hitchhiker's Guide to the Galaxy)
15. Dick Mills - "Armagiddean War Games"
16. Roger Limb - "Yellow Moon"
17. Elizabeth Parker - "Radio Blackburn"
18. Dick Mills - "Macrocosm"
19. Peter Howell - "Land and People"
20. Jonathan Gibbs - "Houdin's Musical Box" (composed by Marc-Antoine Charpentier)
21. Roger Limb - "Ghost in the Water"
22. Malcolm Clarke - "The Milonga" (closing theme from BBC Radio 3's Borges at 80) (later used in "Enlightenment")
