= Agincourt (band) =

Agincourt were a late sixties English psychedelic folk band.

The band consisted of John Ferdinando, Peter Howell, and Lee Menelaus. They released one privately pressed album under the band name, Fly Away, on the Merlin label. This LP has commanded high prices amongst collectors especially after a mid-nineties CD release. In total, the partnership released five albums credited without the band name.

The members of Agincourt were also involved in writing tracks for Alice Through The Looking Glass, Ithaca, and Tomorrow Come Someday.

The group broke up in the early 1970s when Howell secured a BBC sound engineering position and worked on the soundtrack for Doctor Who. Ferdinando would sporadically involve himself in the folk music scene thereafter. As for Menelaus, she performed small roles of vocals and spoken-word on soundtracks.
