= Space Adventures – Music from 'Doctor Who' 1963–1968 =

Space Adventures - Music from 'Doctor Who' 1963 - 1968

Soundtrack album
- Released: 1987
- Genre: Soundtrack
- Label: Reference Department of the Doctor Who Appreciation Society; Julian Knott (CD reissue)
- Producer: Julian Knott

Doctor Who soundtrack chronology
The Music II (1985)	Space Adventures – Music from 'Doctor Who' 1963 - 1968 (1987)	The Doctor Who 25th Anniversary Album (1988)

Cover of the 1998 CD reissue

Space Adventures – Music from 'Doctor Who' 1963 - 1968 is a collection of stock music used in the BBC TV series Doctor Who. First issued on cassette in September 1987 in a limited edition of 300 copies, with red or blue text, by DWAS, it was reissued on CD, expanded to cover through 1971, by the researcher Julian Knott, again in a limited issue of 300 copies.

== Track listing ==
=== Original cassette ===
Track #	Artist	Track name	Stories used in
Side One
1	Nelson & Raymond	Three Guitars Mood 2	An Unearthly Child
2	Douglas Gamley	Machine Room	The Tenth Planet
3	Pierre Arvay	Little Prelude	The Massacre of St Bartholomew's Eve
4	Robert Gerhard	Asyndeton	The Space Museum
5	Pierre Arvay	Hunted Man	The Massacre of St Bartholomew's Eve
6	J. Scott	Palpitations	The Tomb of the Cybermen
7	Robert Gerhard	Telergic	The Tomb of the Cybermen
8	F. Bayle	Andromeda	The Web of Fear
9	Walter Stott	Music For Technology - Part One	The Tenth Planet
10	E. Nordgren	Bathysphere	The Space Museum (Note: This recording was not featured in Doctor Who and was included only because of inaccurate or incomplete documentation. 'Bathysphere' does not appear in 'the Space Museum' or any other 'Doctor Who' story. Its inclusion here was because of a mix up - 'Bathysphere' is the B-side of MQ 759 whereas it was a brief section of the A-side, 'Aliens', that was used in the episode (played at near-half speed over the film insert of Vicki's glass reassembling). Whoever compiled the PasB for the episode simply wrote down the title from the wrong side of the disc.)
11	Edwin Braden	Spine Chillers	The Web of Fear
12	Martin Slavin	Space Adventure	The Tenth Planet; The Moonbase; The Tomb of the Cybermen
Side Two
1	Douglas Gamley	Power Drill	The Tenth Planet
2	Paul Bonneau	Sidereal Universe	The Tomb of the Cybermen
3	Pierre Arvay	Frightened Man	The Massacre of St Bartholomew's Eve
4	Robert Gerhard	Meteoroids	The Time Meddler
5	W. Josephs	Space Time Music - Part One	The Tomb of the Cybermen; The Web of Fear
6	W. Josephs	Space Time Music - Part Two	The Tomb of the Cybermen; The Web of Fear
7	Buxton Orr	Musique Concrete II	The Edge of Destruction
8	Syd Dale	Impending Danger	The Web of Fear
9	Jack Trombey	World of Plants	The Space Museum

=== CD Bonus Tracks ===
Track #	Artist	Track name	Stories used in
22	H. Feishner	Desert Storm	The Tomb of the Cybermen
23	Buxton Orr	Musique Concrete	The Space Museum
24	Roger Roger	Blast Off!	The Tenth Planet (Note: This recording was not featured in Doctor Who and was included only because of inaccurate or incomplete documentation. 'Blast Off' is a distinctive track and is clearly not used in any episode of 'Tenth Planet' - something Andrew Pixley has acknowledged both on Outpost Gallifrey and in the Panini 'Doctor Who - The Complete History' release for that story. The track was planned to be used over the opening captions of part one but in the episode this sequence is music-free.)
25	E. Sendel	Astronautics Suite	The Space Museum; The Tomb of The Cybermen
26	Jack Trombey	Youngbeat	The Evil of the Daleks (Note: This recording was not featured in Doctor Who and was included only because of inaccurate or incomplete documentation. 'Youngbeat' (or more correctly 'Young Beat') is the name of both a 10" De Wolfe Library LP and its opening track, incorrectly featured here. The correct track is 'Mexican Beat'.)
27	Keith Papworth	Spotlight Sequins No.1	Terror of the Autons
28	Trevor Duncan	Mutations	1958 BBC serial Quatermass and the Pit; The Space Museum (Note: This recording was not featured in Doctor Who and was included only because of inaccurate or incomplete documentation. 'Mutations' - the PasB for 'The Space Museum' correctly lists the featured track as 'Mutations: Background' (aka 'Mutations No.1(c)') from BM 158-A. The track on this CD is clearly not that piece but 'Mutations No. 1(a) - Opening'. This was never used in 'Doctor Who' but was employed as the theme music to the TV version of 'Quatermass and the Pit'.)
