= The Joy Of... =

The Joy Of…

Studio album by FourPlay String Quartet
- Released: 2000
- Genre: Rock
- Length: 52:12
- Label: Smart Pussy Records
- Producer: Unknown

FourPlay String Quartet chronology
Catgut Ya' Tongue? (1998)	The Joy Of… (2000)	Now to the Future (2006)

The Joy Of... is the second studio album by FourPlay String Quartet. It was released in 2000.

== Track listing ==
No.	Title	Length
1.	"Domino"	3:31
2.	"Just Like U Said It Would B"	4:10
3.	"August"	4:12
4.	"Meshugganah (Dub)"	4:06
5.	"Meshugganah (Klezmer)"	2:32
6.	"Ich Bin Ein Auslander"	4:00
7.	"Breakfast in America"	2:42
8.	"The Boy from Ipanema"	4:22
9.	"On the Road Again"	1:50
10.	"Cut Up"	3:10
11.	"Lilli Pilli Drive"	5:04
12.	"Gypsy Scream"	3:36
13.	"Femme Fatale"	4:41
Total length:		53:56
