= BBC Sound Effects No. 26: Sci-Fi Sound Effects =

BBC Sound Effects No. 26 - Sci-Fi Sound Effects

Compilation album by BBC Radiophonic Workshop
- Released: December 1981
- Recorded: 1977–1981
- Genre: Electronic music, Sound effects
- Length: 43:50
- Label: BBC Records
- Compiler: William Grierson

BBC Radiophonic Workshop chronology
BBC Radiophonic Workshop – 21 (1979)	BBC Sound Effects No. 26 - Sci-Fi Sound Effects (1981)	Doctor Who: The Music (1983)

Doctor Who soundtrack chronology
BBC Sound Effects No. 19 - Doctor Who Sound Effects (1978)	BBC Sound Effects No. 26 - Sci-Fi Sound Effects (1981)	Doctor Who - The Music (1983)

BBC Sound Effects No. 26: Sci-Fi Sound Effects is a 1981 compilation of sound effects and atmospheres created by the BBC Radiophonic Workshop. It was the second in the BBC Sound Effects series to be credited to the Workshop. It featured sounds from popular television series Doctor Who (all from Season 18) and Blake's 7, as well as effects for the first series of the radio versions of Douglas Adams' The Hitchhiker's Guide to the Galaxy and James Follett's Earthsearch. In 1991 it was re-released on CD as Essential Science Fiction Sound Effects Vol. 1. Reissued on CD with its original title and cover as part of AudioGo's "Vintage Beeb" line 4 April 2013.

Although seemingly a compilation of merely incidental effects, the album influenced pioneering electronic band The Orb enough for them to name their 1989 single "A Huge Ever Growing Pulsating Brain That Rules from the Centre of the Ultraworld" after one of its tracks.

== Track listing ==
=== The Hitchhiker's Guide to the Galaxy series 1 (Mono effects by Dick Mills) ===
1. "The Book's Activation Code"
2. "Slartibartfast's Aircar: Takeoff"
3. "Slartibartfast's Aircar: Constant run"
4. "Slartibartfast's Aircar: Lands"
5. "Magrathea Alarm"
6. "Magrathea Police guns"
7. "Space car park outside The Restaurant at the End of the Universe"
8. "The End of the Universe"
9. "Black spaceship oscillates"
10. "Ravenous Bugblatter Beast of Traal: Eats"
11. "Ravenous Bugblatter Beast of Traal: Walks"
12. "Ravenous Bugblatter Beast of Traal: Roars"
13. "Penargilon Kangaroo Relocation Drive engaged"
14. "Penargilon Kangaroo Relocation Drive arrival"
15. "Golgafrincham Ark Fleet, Ship 'B' Bridge Background"

=== Doctor Who (Stereo effects by Dick Mills) ===
1. "Earth Shuttle Arriving" (from "The Leisure Hive")
2. "Argolis Exterior Atmosphere" (from "The Leisure Hive")
3. "Flock Of Bats" (from "State of Decay")
4. "Laboratory Descends, Gaztak Spaceship Takes Off" (from "Meglos")
5. "Dodecahedron Energy Beams" (from "Meglos")
6. "Marshmen Emerge from the Mistfall" (from "Full Circle")
7. "Respirator Room background in Spaceship" (from "Warriors' Gate")
8. "Time Winds" (from "Warriors' Gate")
9. "Alarm" (from "The Keeper of Traken")
10. "Electronic Storm" (from "The Keeper of Traken")
11. "Cloister Bell In The TARDIS" (from "Logopolis")
12. "The Master's TARDIS Lands" (from "Logopolis")
13. "The Master's TARDIS Take Off" (from "Logopolis")
14. "TARDIS 'Out Of Time Slip'" (from "Logopolis")
15. "TARDIS 'Into Time Slip'" (from "Logopolis")

=== Blake's 7 Series D (Stereo effects by Elizabeth Parker) ===
1. "Dawn Of Emptiness"
2. "Space Bells Of Ceremonial Room"
3. "Scorpio Spaceship Lands"
4. "Dematerialisation"
5. "Rematerialisation"
6. "Scorpio Gun"

=== Blake's 7 Series A-C (Mono effects by Richard Yeoman-Clark & Elizabeth Parker) ===
1. "Orac Switch On"
2. "Orac Working"
3. "Orac Switch Off"
4. "Liberator Computer Mailfunction"
5. "Liberator Plasma Bolt Explosion"
6. "Liberator Laser"
7. "Federation Ship Laser Explosion"
8. "Liberator Life Capsule Ready to be Launched"
9. "Liberator Ship Background"
10. "Liberator Guns X3"
11. "Avon's Communicator Bracelet Transportation Sounds"
12. "Disappearance"
13. "Reappearance"
14. "Mysterious 'Being' Disappears in a Flame"
15. "Alien Gun"
16. "Appearance Of The Ovoid (A Stone Surrounded in Mystery and Magic)"
17. "Heavy Voltage Force"
18. "Glow From A Mysterious Ghost Who Haunts the Liberator"
19. "The Core, A Huge Evergrowing Pulsating Brain which Rules from the Centre of Ultraworld"
20. "Interior Of Federation Patrol Ship"
21. "Going Through A Black Hole in the Liberator"
22. "Space Centre Medical Unit Hum"
23. "Machine Monster with a Black Sense of Humour! (who Chases our Heroes Around, Winking)"
24. "Break Down Of Machine Monster"
25. "Extra-terrestrial Heavenly Choir"

=== Earthsearch (Stereo effects by Lloyd Silverthorne) ===
1. "UFO Landing"
2. "Computer Touch Panel Bleeps"
3. "Warbles"
4. "Alarm"
5. "Meteorite Alert Station"
6. "Rumbling Gurgle"
7. "Hand Held Ray Guns"
8. "Space Bombs"
9. "Space Police"
10. "Outer Airlock Door Open and Close"
11. "Inner Airlock Door Open and Close"
12. "Plasma Discharge Weapons"
13. "Underworld Animation Chamber"
14. "Bleeps for Suspended Animation Chamber"
15. "Electric Warning Gong"
16. "Three Harmonic Strings Followed by Explosion"
17. "Sharp Hum With Trail Out"
18. "Rapid Fire Laser Guns"
19. "Space Hurricane"
20. "Spacecraft Crash Into Sea"
