= FourPlay String Quartet =

FourPlay
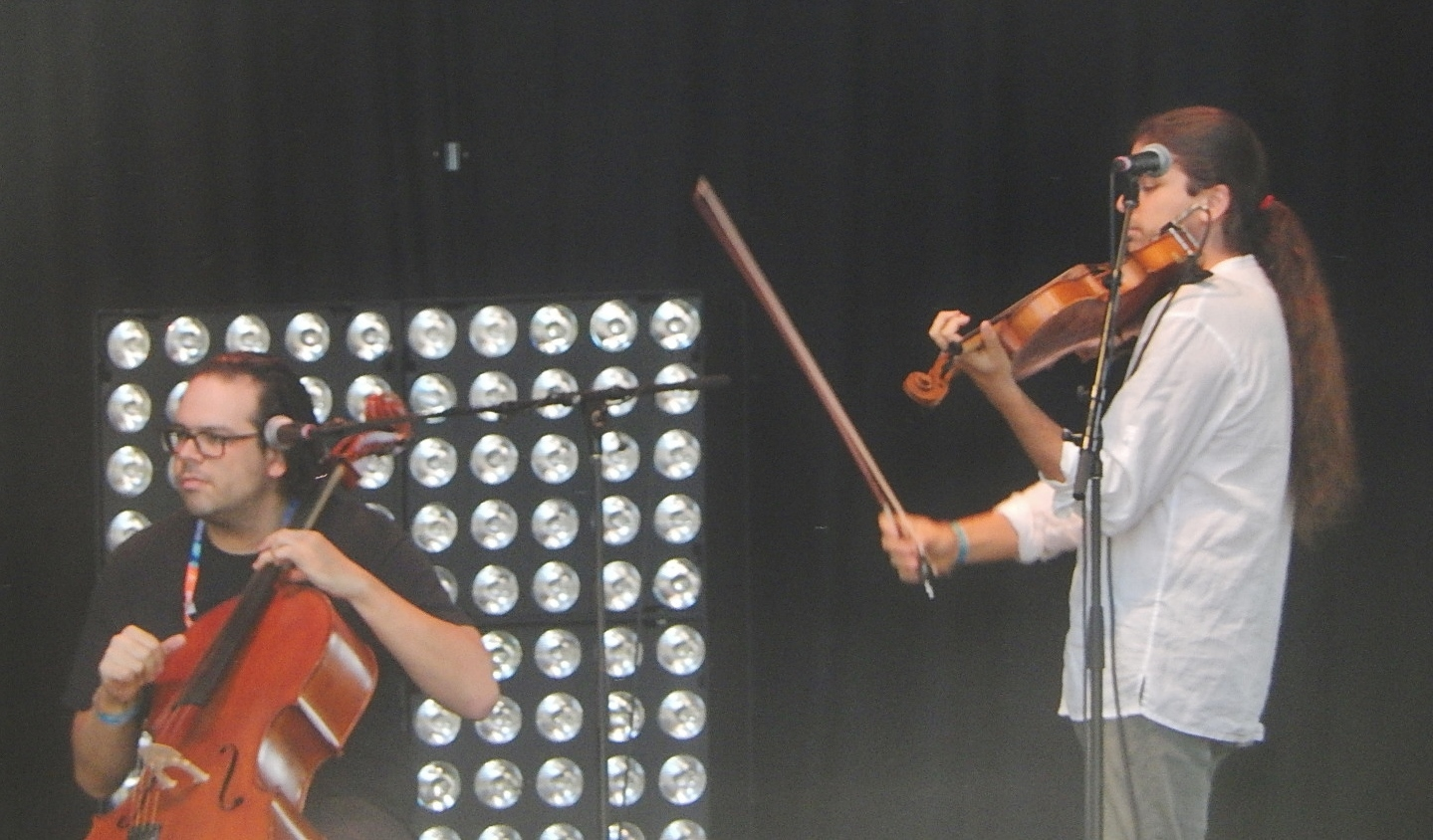
- At WOMADelaide

Background information
- Origin: Sydney, New South Wales, Australia
- Genres: Alternative rock, classical, jazz, rock, string quartet
- Years active: 1995–present
- Label: Smart Pussy Records
- Members: Tim Hollo; Peter Hollo; Lara Goodridge; Shenzo Gregorio
- Past members: Veren Grigorov; Chris Emerson
- Website: Home Page

FourPlay String Quartet are an Australian string quartet from Sydney, formed in 1995 and renowned for playing music not typically associated with the format.

FourPlay's members include brothers Tim Hollo (violin and viola) and Peter Hollo (cello), Lara Goodridge (violin and vocals) and Shenzo Gregorio (viola); former members include: Veren Grigorov (viola) & Chris Emerson (viola). Although all members of FourPlay had formal classical training, the band play an eccentric form of rock music, with subtle influences from three of the four band members' Jewish heritage (although FourPlay regard themselves as an Australian band above all else) as well as gypsy, pop, folk, hip-hop, electronica, post-rock, folktronica and many other forms.

== History ==
FourPlay's first album, Catgut Ya' Tongue? was released in 1998, and featured mostly covers (of bands including Metallica and Depeche Mode, and the theme from Doctor Who), along with a few original compositions. In late 1999, Emerson left to get married in England and was replaced by Veren Grigorov. FourPlay released their second album, The Joy Of... in 2000, which included, among other things, a two-part dub/klezmer composition, a distortion-heavy cover of Pop Will Eat Itself's Ich Bin Ein Auslander, and a gypsy-style instrumental ending with a mass scream. This was followed, a year later (2001), by a 2-disc remix compilation, Digital Manipulation, featuring work by many Australian musicians, including Machine Translations, B(if)tek and Darrin Verhagen. FourPlay have also toured abroad extensively, and supported artists including george and The Whitlams.

In 2004, Grigorov was replaced by Shenton Gregory aka Shenzo Gregorio, renowned stunt violinist from Brisbane. Shenzo's personality and style meshed perfectly into FourPlay, and he took to the viola instantly. A highly fertile period of new composition resulted in many new originals, as well as covers of Radiohead, The Strokes, and various jazz/blues numbers. These were recorded in the latter half of 2005 and appear on Now To The Future, released in June 2006.

In July 2009, Fourthcoming, their fourth album, was released. Most of the tracks were written 3 years prior. Recorded live at the Street Theatre in Canberra over three small gigs. Like the previous three albums, Fourthcoming contains a number of covers. Rage Against the Machine, Leonard Cohen and Sufjan Stevens. A number of the original songs contain politically charged lyrics. The track A Grain of Truth was inspired by the AWB (Australian Wheat Board) scandal. The track Where The Sun Don't Shine was written in response to the former Prime Minister of Australia John Howard's sustainable energy policy for the 2007 election. The track Rudd-a-dub Dub refers to the then-current Prime Minister, Kevin Rudd.

In August 2010, the band collaborated with author Neil Gaiman and comics author/artist Eddie Campbell at the inaugural Graphic festival at the Sydney Opera House, composing a 70-minute accompaniment to Gaiman's novella "The Truth is a Cave in the Black Mountains". The twelve year long collaboration between Mr. Gaiman and the FourPlay String Quartet culminated in the 2023 record Signs of Life, which was nominated for the "Best Classical Album" ARIA Award for 2023.

== Discography ==
=== Studio albums ===
- Catgut Ya' Tongue? (1998)
- The Joy Of... (2000)
- Now To The Future (2006)
- Fourthcoming (2009)
- This Machine (2014)
- Signs of Life (with Neil Gaiman)

== Awards and nominations ==
=== AIR Awards ===
The Australian Independent Record Awards (commonly known informally as AIR Awards) is an annual awards night to recognise, promote and celebrate the success of Australia's Independent Music sector.

| Year | Nominee / work | Award | Result |
|---|---|---|---|
| 2007 | Now to the Future | Best Independent Jazz Album | Nominated |

=== ARIA Music Awards ===
The ARIA Music Awards is an annual award ceremony event celebrating the Australian music industry.

| Year | Nominee / work | Award | Result | Ref. |
|---|---|---|---|---|
| 2023 | Signs of Life (with Neil Gaiman) | Best Classical Album | Nominated | |
