= Now to the Future =

Studio album by FourPlay String Quartet
- Released: 2006
- Recorded: Unknown
- Genre: Rock
- Length: 52:12
- Label: Smart Pussy Records
- Producer: Unknown

FourPlay String Quartet chronology
The Joy Of… (2000)	Now to the Future (2006)	Fourthcoming (2009)

Now to the Future is an album by FourPlay String Quartet. It is their third studio album, and features more originals and fewer covers than the previous two. Track 9, Bollyrock, fuses the styles of traditional Indian raga with a rock style.

== Track listing ==
#	Title	Length	Writer
1.	"2 + 2 = 5"	3:38	Radiohead
2.	"Evolve or Decay"	4:48	original by Lara Goodridge
3.	"Downtown Nudnik"	4:33	original by Peter Hollo
4.	"You've Changed Your Tune"	4:26	original by all four members
5.	"Reptilia"	3:29	Julian Casablancas / The Strokes
6.	"All Blues"	4:23	Miles Davis
7.	"Trust"	3:48	original by Lara Goodridge
8.	"Now To The Future"	6:10	original by all four members
9.	"Bollyrock"	8:22	original by all four members
10.	"Cry Me a River"	4:36	Arthur Hamilton
11.	"Goodbye Pork Pie Hat" (Theme for Lester Young)	4:40	Charles Mingus / Rahsaan Roland Kirk
12.	"The Hunter"	4:57	original by Lara Goodridge
13.	"Appalachian Jam"	8:27	original by all four members
