= Catgut Ya Tongue =

Catgut Ya' Tongue?

Studio album by FourPlay String Quartet
- Released: 1998
- Genre: Rock
- Length: 44:10

FourPlay String Quartet chronology
Catgut Ya' Tongue? (1998)	The Joy Of… (2000)

Catgut Ya' Tongue? is an album by FourPlay String Quartet. This is their first studio album; it mainly consists of covers with two original tracks.

== Track listing ==
#	Title	Length	Writer
1.	"Theme from Dr Who"	2:56	Ron Grainer
2.	"Corrosion"	4:47	original by Peter Hollo and Chris Emerson
3.	"Grace"	5:02	Jeff Buckley and Gary Lucas
4.	"My Baby Just Cares For Me"	3:13	Nina Simone
5.	"The 2 Of Us"	5:37	Suede
6.	"Enter Sandman"	3:50	Metallica
7.	"Theme from The Simpsons"	1:11	Danny Elfman
8.	"Sabotage"	2:38	The Beastie Boys
9.	"Led Zeppelin Medley"	4:36	Led Zeppelin
10.	"The Sweetest Perfection"	4:51	Depeche Mode
11.	"Languid, Yet…"	5:29	original by Peter Hollo
