= Mankind (band) =

Disco band

Mankind were a disco band formed in 1978 consisting of engineer Don Gallacher, keyboard player Mark Stevens, Dave Christopher on guitar, Dave Green on bass and Graham Jarvis on drums. They had a #25 on the UK Singles Chart with a disco rendition of the Doctor Who theme music.

== Background ==
In an interview with MigMag.co.uk, engineer Don Gallacher said that he had the idea for a disco version of the Doctor Who theme music after hearing Meco's Star Wars Theme, and at the suggestion of his three-year-old son, decided that as disco was still popular, it would be a good idea for him to create a disco version of Dr. Who's theme. He commented: "If it wasn't disco it was punk, and I couldn't stand punk".

Together with keyboard player Mark Stevens, he recruited guitarist Dave Christopher, bassist Dave Green and drummer Graham Jarvis - his usual session drummer, Graham Hollingsworth, wasn't available - and booked, in his words, "the cheapest 24-track studio I could find, above a bingo hall in Clapham, London" and had the track completed in twelve hours: three hours a day, for four days. According to the inlay notes of "The Ultimate Seventies Collection Volume 6: Solid Gold", a BMG/Telstar 8-disc box-set released in 2001 that featured the track, that studio was known as "Gaumont Studios". He added some vocals due to the BBC Radio 1's "absolute anti-instrumental policy: if it didn't have a voice on it, they wouldn't play it" which he later denounced as "absolute garbage". The single was backed by "Time Traveller".

After Gallacher sent cassette copies off to the major labels, he decided to release the single himself so that it could be released in time for Christmas. He found a small pressing plant, Motor Records, which said "we'll do it all for you" and produced 500 copies. Shifting them was not easy, however; Gallacher called the sleeve "so awful – I couldn't bear to look at it, let alone put it out. It had this horrible orange sticker... it looked as if someone had made up an old stamp-printing set, like a kiddie's printing set – horrible", and "the only way that a record shop would buy stock from the makers was to have an account. Getting an account with a major was not an easy thing to do". However, he eventually found a wholesaler - Ray Self of the One Stop record shop in Euston Tower - who agreed to produce the first 1,000 copies as long as they were 12-inch picture sleeves. They were printed as "dazzling, eye-catching translucent blue" vinyls with no writing on it; talking to MigMag.co.uk, he said this was because a supermarket supplier "advised me that a product label is designed to get the customer to pick it up. If they pick it up they are more than 60% likely to buy it. So I had the cover designed without any writing on the front at all. The record shop owners would literally have to pick it up to see what it was".

On 13 October 1978, he collected and delivered the new pressings to the wholesalers, clubs and smaller shops around London. On his way home, he spotted a disco and asked the DJ to play his record. Despite it being in the shops for a matter of hours, the DJ took out his copy of the record, leading Gallacher to believe he may have a hit on his hands.

Eventually, distribution was delegated to Pinnacle at the suggestion of Pete Waterman, then a new distributor, who produced new 7-inch pressings and multi-coloured versions of the 12-inch. The deal was biased towards Pinnacle due to his desire to "get it over and done with", who placed a sticker saying "Pinnacle Records" placed over the "Motor" logo and the word "Motor" placed somewhere else on the record in far smaller print. They got it played on Radio Luxembourg, though not BBC Radio One, as they would have seemed biased in playing a remix of one of their theme tunes. On 25 November 1978, the track entered the top 40 of the UK Singles Chart, eventually peaking at #25 and spending 12 weeks in the chart. Gallacher reckons that over 240,000 copies were sold and that "if a single sold that many copies between October and January in the present day, it would probably be number one for the entire Christmas/New Year period".

== Top of the Pops ==
Even before the track had been recorded, Gallacher had contacted Graham Williams, the then producer of Doctor Who, and at a meeting over a drink, he told him what he wanted - if they made it onto Top of the Pops, they wanted their performance to contain "swirling Daleks and the TARDIS and all those effects". He made a point of doing it as early as possible, on the grounds that "if we have to ask for them with one day's notice it will never happen".

After the song charted, distributor Pinnacle rung Gallacher to tell him they would be appearing on Top of the Pops. They performed three times, with these performances involving the band wearing Tom Baker-esque hats and scarves, the audience bopping, and visuals of the Bernard Lodge credit sequence being mixed in. In addition, Paul Martinelli substituted for Dave Christopher (because, according to Gallacher, "he wasn't good looking enough") and in what Gallacher called a "welcome irony" Graham Hollingworth on drums. It is unknown why they were engaged, however Gallacher suggested they may have been on tour with Cliff Richard. However, miming to the track was not allowed due to instructions from the Musicians' Union and thus they had to re-record it and then mime to that. This was next to impossible; though the musicians were capable of recording the backing track in one take, Gallacher and Stevens had spent days overdubbing keyboards and synthesizers, which couldn't be redone in three hours. Thus, Gallacher told the members to arrive before the Union representative arrives, and that they would "pretend" to re-record the track. However, Dave Green, the bass player, heeded no such instruction and arrived later, leading to Gallacher needing to hit "talkback" and give instructions to Green and take frequent "trips to the loo"; on one of these, Gallacher found Green ascending the stairs, whispered to him instructions, and he snuck into the studio.

== 1979 Doctor Who convention ==
1,000 copies were produced exclusively for the first Doctor Who convention in Los Angeles. Gallacher was exclusively responsible for the fourth Doctor, Tom Baker, being present at the convention, as he found out that the BBC TV technicians were going on strike that day and thus asked convention producer Lucy Chase Williams and her co-producer Amy Krell if it was worth him calling Graham Williams to see if Baker could get there. The convention was on the top of the Sunset Hyatt Hotel and demand was such that the queue for autographs filled the entire convention floor and down into the street outside and they had to continue the following day on Venice Beach.

== After "Dr. Who" ==
Pinnacle wanted Mankind to issue a follow-up recording immediately. However, the follow-up, "Chain Reaction", flopped despite thousands of pounds being spent on it and it being recorded in a 48 track studio and being backed by "Funky Revolution". An extended period of time went by before Mankind was resurrected for Ovation Records, for "Dark Star Angel" and "UFO", which were released in 1980 and flopped. Mark Stevens, Paul Martinelli, Dave Green and Graham Jarvis are all deceased.

== Appearances in other media ==
- The song was used in an advert for The Androids of Tara.
- Pea Green Philharmonic Pullover Set covered this song for a six-track covers EP in 1979.
- Ron Grainer himself recorded a version in 1979 as a 'middle-way' between the original, orchestral version, and Mankind's version. This version appeared on his album The Exciting Television Music of Ron Grainer.
- The song was remixed in 1984: Gallacher was commissioned by the BBC to produce a remix for a recording, and was assisted by Ron Baker. The B-Side, "Dr. When", was based on an abandoned ABBA tribute, "My My My".
- The song was featured as the B-Side of Dominic Glynn's 1987 version of the theme music.
- In 2001, a shortened version of the 7-inch version was featured on the BMG/Telstar compilation album The Ultimate Seventies Collection Volume Six: Solid Gold.
- In 2011, Gallacher assembled all six seventies recordings - "Dr. Who", "Time Traveller", "Chain Reaction", "Funky Revolution", "Dark Star Angel" and "UFO" and released an album of their radio edits and then their club versions.
- In 2013, that album was rereleased physically with extra opening and closing tracks: a remix by Dos Amigoz opens the album; the 1984 remix closes it. This rerelease came about after he ran into his old friend, Andy Richmond, and owns his own label, Mondo Recordings, and mentioned his ideas for a Mankind album. He promptly received a phone call in favour of the idea, and suggested that Dos Amigoz did the remix. On the subject of that remix, Gallacher said "I awaited the new remix with some trepidation. What if I didn't like it? Well, it arrived and I didn't like it - I absolutely loved it! These were the sounds I could only dream about in 1978!"
