= Fourthcoming =

Studio album by FourPlay String Quartet
- Released: 3 July 2009
- Recorded: The Street Theatre, Canberra
- Genre: Rock
- Label: Smart Pussy Records
- Producer: Unknown

FourPlay String Quartet chronology
Now to the Future (2006)	Fourthcoming (2009)

Fourthcoming is an album by FourPlay String Quartet. Fourthcoming, their fourth album, and their first to be recorded live, was released July 3, 2009.

It follows the trend of their previous album Now to the Future, containing more originals than covers.

== Track listing ==
#	Title	Length	Writer
1.	"Everything Was Going Fine... "		original by Peter Hollo & FourPlay String Quartet
2.	"Butter Girl"		original by Lara Goodridge
3.	"Seekers who are Lovers"		Cocteau Twins
4.	"The Predatory Wasp of the Palisades Is Out To Get Us!"		Sufjan Stevens
5.	"Venice Underwater"		original by Shenzo Gregorio and FourPlay String Quartet
6.	"A Grain of Truth"		original by FourPlay String Quartet
7.	"Rudd-a-dub Dub"		original by FourPlay String Quartet
8.	"Killing in the Name"		Rage Against the Machine
9.	"Spanish Castle Magic"		Jimi Hendrix
10.	"Where The Sun Don't Shine"		original by Tim Hollo & FourPlay String Quartet
11.	"Famous Blue Raincoat"		Leonard Cohen
12.	"Lover Man"		James Edward Davis, Ram Ramirez & Jimmy Sherman, originally performed by Billie Holiday
