= The Machine That Changed the World (TV series) =

The Machine That Changed the World (1992) (broadcast the previous year under the alternative title "The Dream Machine" in the UK, with different narration, content & editing) is a 5-episode television series on the history of electronic digital computers. It was written and directed by Nancy Linde, and produced by WGBH Television of Boston, Massachusetts, and the British Broadcasting Corporation. Backers included the Association for Computing Machinery, the National Science Foundation, and the UNISYS Corporation.

The first three episodes deal with the history of fully electronic general-purpose digital computers from the ENIAC through desktop microcomputers. The pre-history of such machines is examined in the first episode ("Giant Brains"), and includes a discussion of the contributions of Charles Babbage, Ada Lovelace, Alan Turing, and others. The fourth episode ("The Thinking Machine") explores the topic of artificial intelligence. The fifth episode ("The World at Your Fingertips") explores the then-newly-emerging worldwide networking of computers. All episodes begin and end with a song by Peter Howell, "Stellae matutinae radius exoritur" ("The morning star's ray arises") and are narrated by long-time Frontline narrator Will Lyman.
