= Myths and Other Legends =

- Cover of the CD reissue

Soundtrack album by Mark Ayres
- Released: 1990
- Genre: Soundtrack
- Length: 71:19
- Label: Metro Music; Silva Screen

Mark Ayres chronology
| Myths and Other Legends (1990) | Doctor Who: The Curse of Fenric (1991) |

Myths and Other Legends is an album of music from Reeltime Pictures series of Myth Makers documentary videos on the BBC television series Doctor Who. First released on LP by Metro Music in 1990 and in an expanded format on CD by Silva Screen Records in 1991.

== Track listing ==
1. Myth Makers Theme (2.09)
2. Mythterious (2.49)
3. I Myth You (1.54)
4. Daleks! (4.44)
5. Terror in Totters Lane (1.53)
6. The Headmaster (0.57)
7. The Fox Goes Free (5.13)
8. The Park (3.15)

8.1 Introduction (1.07)
8.2 On the Run (0.29)
8.3 Mother Nature (0.31)
8.4 The Master (0.16)
8.5 Alien Hand (0.18)
8.6 Return of the Hand (0.34)

9. Star Field (1.40)
10. Myth Runner (Original Soundtrack) Part 1 (9.05)

10.1 Main Title (3.02)
10.2 Five Minutes Beyond (1.34)
10.3 The Boss (3.03)
10.4 Zendar's Sentinel and First Contact (1.26)

11. Running (Chase Theme from Myth Runner) (2.44)
12. Myth Runner (Original Soundtrack) Part 2 (9.05)

12.1 Death of the Celebrity (0.35)
12.2 Hotel (1.28)
12.3 The Injured Party (1.35)
12.4 Something to Help You Sleep (0.47)
12.5 Stop Him! (1.12)
12.6 The Grand Finale (2.06)
12.7 Closing Title (1.22)

13. Myth Runner II (3.21)
14. The Digitan (3.47)
15. The Disappointment (3.45)
16. Mythed Again (2.16)
17. Running 1991 (4.45)
18. Myth Runner II (extended CD mix) (7.38)
