= Dominic Glynn =

- Born: Dominic Francis Glynn; 27 September 1960 (age 65); Cuckfield, Sussex, England
- Occupation: Composer
- Years active: 1985–present

Dominic Francis Glynn (born 27 September 1960) is an English electronic composer.

Glynn is a prolific composer of music for television and film. His work includes the arrangement of the Doctor Who theme music which served as the series' theme for Season 23 of the programme. It was replaced by Keff McCulloch's arrangement the next season. He also wrote the incidental music for the Doctor Who stories The Mysterious Planet, The Ultimate Foe, Dragonfire, The Happiness Patrol and Survival. Big Finish Productions has used his arrangement of the theme on several audio plays featuring the Sixth Doctor, starting with Jubilee in 2003. Glynn has a long-term working relationship as composer for the films of British filmmaker Anthony Baxter, which began with the 2011 documentary You've Been Trumped. Subsequent films include A Dangerous Game (2014), You’ve Been Trumped Too (2016), Flint: Who Can You Trust (2020) and Eye of the Storm (2021) which won the British Academy Scotland Award for Specialist Factual in 2021. Glynn was a guest of honour at the science fiction convention ArmadaCon in November 2024.

== Other notable works ==
In 1994, Glynn worked with World Championship Wrestling (WCW) to compose "Warped Mind", the entrance theme of professional wrestler Alex Wright, which he used for the entirety of his WCW career.

In 1998, "Stressed Out" from "Strictly Drum 'N' Bass", an album made by Glynn, Justin Anthony Mackay and James Young was used as the main theme song for the Oblivion roller coaster at Alton Towers in Staffordshire.

In the early 2000s, Glynn collaborated with screenwriter David McGillivray, writing the music for a series of short low budget horror films which were screened at The London FrightFest Film Festival.

In 2007, Glynn wrote and performed the score for the British crime thriller Bad Day, starring Claire Goose and Donna Air and Sarah Harding. As a regular writer for Universal Music Publishing Group, and other production music libraries, his music has featured in episodes of The Simpsons, Red Dwarf, Episodes, Homeland, The Late Show with Stephen Colbert, and Eerie Indiana, and the feature films Holy Man and Kevin & Perry Go Large.

In 2005/2006, his composition "Dangerous Beauty" was used as the theme to the hit Dutch television thriller series, Vuurzee. A number of his production music tracks have been aired on the Adult Swim TV channel "bumps".

Glynn has also been active in the alternative electronica field, running the left field record label, No Bones Records and recording under the names Fluid and Cybajaz and, with Justin Mackay, as Syzygy. Much of his work as Syzygy was released during the 1990s on Rising High Records. Syzygy also released music on Infonet Records — an electronic music offshoot of Creation Records. He also co-composed the score of the video game Forsaken (performing as The Swarm) and also contributed music for Re-Volt, both published by Acclaim Entertainment. He has collaborated with Michael Faulkner's D-Fuse AV in both live performance and music videos and has been seen regularly as both artist and DJ at The Big Chill.

Glynn has written soundtrack music for many of B7 Productions's audio plays, based on the BBC TV series Blake's 7, which subsequently were aired on BBC Radio 4 Extra.
