= Doctor Who theme music =

TV theme by Ron Grainer and Delia Derbyshire

Doctor Who theme excerpt
An excerpt from Delia Derbyshire's original arrangement of the theme music to Doctor Who

The Doctor Who theme music is the theme song of the science fiction programme Doctor Who. It was written by the Australian composer Ron Grainer and realised by Delia Derbyshire at the BBC Radiophonic Workshop in 1963, and was the first electronic music signature tune for television. It has been adapted and covered many times.

Although numerous arrangements of the theme have been used on television, the main melody has remained the same. The theme was originally written and arranged in the key of E minor. Most versions of the theme – including the current arrangement by Murray Gold – have retained the use of the original key, with exceptions being Peter Howell (F♯ minor) and Keff McCulloch's (A minor) arrangements.

Although widely listed in reference works, and many series soundtrack albums, under the title "Doctor Who Theme", its official title is "Doctor Who", although its initial sheet music release used the now-deprecated form "Dr. Who".

== History ==
=== 1960s ===
The original 1963 recording of the Doctor Who theme music is widely regarded as a significant and innovative piece of electronic music, recorded well before the availability of commercial synthesisers. Delia Derbyshire (assisted by Dick Mills) of the BBC Radiophonic Workshop used musique concrète techniques to realise a score written by composer Ron Grainer. Each note was individually created by cutting, splicing, speeding up and slowing down segments of analogue tape containing recordings of a single plucked string, white noise, and the simple harmonic waveforms of test-tone oscillators which were used for calibrating equipment and rooms, not creating music. The main, pulsing bassline rhythm was created from a recording of a single plucked string, played over and over again in different patterns created by splicing copies of the sound, with different pitches and notes achieved by playing the sample in different speeds. The swooping melody and lower bassline layer were created by manually adjusting the pitch of oscillator banks to a carefully timed pattern. The non-swooping parts of the melody were created by playing a keyboard attached to the oscillator banks. The rhythmic hissing sounds, "bubbles" and "clouds", were created by cutting tape recordings of filtered white noise.

Once each sound had been created, it was modified. Some sounds were created at all the required pitches direct from the oscillators, while others had to be repitched later by adjusting the tape playback speed and re-recording the sound onto another tape player. This process continued until every sound was available at all the required pitches.

Each individual note was then trimmed to length by cutting the tape, and stuck together in the right order. This was done for each "line" in the music – the main plucked bass, the bass slides (an organ-like tone emphasising the grace notes), the hisses, the swoops, the melody, a second melody line (a high organ-like tone used for emphasis), and the bubbles and clouds. Most of these individual bits of tape making up lines of music, complete with edits every inch, still survive.

This done, the music had to be "mixed". There were no multitrack tape machines, so rudimentary multitrack techniques were invented: each length of tape was placed on a separate tape machine and all the machines were started simultaneously and the outputs mixed together. If the machines fell out of sync, they started again, maybe cutting tapes slightly here and there to help. In fact, a number of "submixes" were made to ease the process – a combined bass track, combined melody track, bubble track, and hisses.

Grainer was amazed at the resulting piece of music and when he heard it, asked, "Did I write that?" Derbyshire replied, "Most of it." However, the BBC, who wanted to keep members of the Workshop anonymous, prevented Grainer from giving Derbyshire a co-composer credit and a share of the royalties.

The theme is written in the E minor phrygian mode, and can be divided into several distinctive parts. A rhythmic bassline opens and underlies the theme throughout, followed by a rising and falling set of notes that forms the main melody which is repeated several times. The bridge, also known as the "middle eight", is an uplifting interlude in a major key that usually features in the closing credits or the full version of the theme. During the early years of the series the middle eight was also often heard during the opening credits (most notably in the first episode, An Unearthly Child).

The theme has been often called both memorable and frightening, priming the viewer for what was to follow. During the 1970s, the Radio Times, the BBC's own listings magazine, announced that a child's mother said the theme music terrified her son. The Radio Times was apologetic, but the theme music remained.

Derbyshire created two arrangements in 1963: the first was rejected by the producers, but was released as a single. The second arrangement, a slightly modified version of the first, was used on the first episode of the programme. The two 1963 arrangements served, with only minor edits and additions requested by the producers, as the theme tune up to 1980 and the end of season 17. The most notable of these edits were addition of 'electronic spangles', and tape echo, from the second episode of Patrick Troughton serial The Faceless Ones (1967) onwards (although it was originally made for preceding serial The Macra Terror, a production error led to the previous arrangement still being used; this also occurred in episodes 4 and 5 of Fury from the Deep).

=== 1970s ===
During the Third Doctor's era, beginning in 1970, the theme tune was altered. The theme was edited to match the new credit sequence, with a stutter effect added to the bassline at the start of the theme, a shortened introduction and part of the main motif repeated to fade at the end of the titles. The "middle eight" was no longer used in the opening sequence. Over the closing credits, parts of the tune were duplicated as required for the theme to end with the credits, rather than fading out as it had previously. The "sting", an electronic shriek, was added to punctuate the episode cliffhangers and serve as a lead-in to the closing theme from The Ambassadors of Death (1970) onwards, with a closing sound effect also introduced, both added by Brian Hodgson of the BBC Radiophonic Workshop. The "middle eight" thus fell out of use in the closing credits from this serial. The first three serials of season 8 reverted to the 1967 arrangement before reinstating the Third Doctor's arrangement for the last two serials of that year. During the Fourth Doctor era, the "middle eight" was heard on only four episodes during his first six seasons – The Invasion of Time parts 3, 4 and 6 and The Armageddon Factor part 6.

In 1972, there was an attempt by Brian Hodgson and Paddy Kingsland, with Delia Derbyshire acting as producer, to modernise the theme tune using the Radiophonic Workshop's modular "Delaware" synthesiser (named after the Workshop's location at Delaware Road). The "Delaware" arrangement, which had a distinct Jew's harp sound, was not well received by BBC executives and was abandoned. The master tapes were given to a fan at the 1983 Longleat celebrations by Hodgson and were never returned. The episodes that used it were redubbed with the 1970 Derbyshire arrangement, but lacking the short bassline stutter at the beginning of the music. The Delaware version was accidentally left on some episodes which were sold to Australia, and survives today in this form. (The complete version of this arrangement of the music is included as an extra on the DVD release of Carnival of Monsters; it is also included on the CD release Doctor Who at the BBC Radiophonic Workshop: Volume 2: New Beginnings 1970–1980.)

The first single arising from the show to make the UK Singles Chart was "Dr. Who" by Mankind. The track was based on the theme music and was Mankind's only hit single. Released by Pinnacle on 25 November 1978, the song peaked at number 25 in the UK Singles Chart and ran for 12 weeks in the BBC Top 75.

=== 1980s ===
For season 18, Radiophonic Workshop staffer Peter Howell provided a new arrangement performed on analogue synthesisers, and having a more dynamic and glossy but less haunting feel. Its bassline was created on a Yamaha CS-80 synthesiser, with reversed echo added, adding to its characteristic "zshumm" sound and emphasising especially the bass slides (which are otherwise still more upfront than in the Derbyshire theme). The sting at the beginning was also created with the CS-80, using its unique ring modulator section. The opening line of the main melody was played on an ARP Odyssey Mk III, the second on an EMS Vocoder 5000, and the "middle eight" and the brass section on a Roland Jupiter-4. The 1980 arrangement added the sting to the opening theme as well, while the "middle eight" was included in the closing theme arrangement of all episodes. Howell's theme is in the key of F♯ minor.

The Howell theme was eventually replaced by a new arrangement by Dominic Glynn for season 23's The Trial of a Time Lord (1986). This version – again synthesizer-driven, like the Howell arrangement, only this time using digital synthesizers – was made to sound more mysterious than previous renditions but was only used for this single season of the series. Glynn's theme reverts to the traditional key of E minor, although it is slightly detuned in some episodes. The bassline was performed on a Roland Juno-6 synthesiser, while the melody and filtered noise effects were performed on a Yamaha DX21 and Korg 770 respectively. The theme removes the bass slides which were featured in all previous official arrangements, and is instead merged into the main bassline.

The Glynn arrangement was itself replaced by a new arrangement by Keff McCulloch for the Seventh Doctor's era beginning with season 24 (1987). McCulloch's arrangement was made using a Sequential Circuits Prophet-5 synthesiser, with the initial 'sting' replaced by a crashing explosive sound. Producer John Nathan-Turner stated that the new music, logo and title sequence were to signal a fresh start to the programme. This was the first version of the theme since the little-used 1973 Delaware version to incorporate the "middle eight" into the opening credits (as well as the closing, although the closing credits saw them extended slightly). McCulloch's theme is in the key of A minor. Delia Derbyshire was reportedly unimpressed with McCulloch's version.

=== 1996 ===
The 1996 Doctor Who television movie used a fully orchestrated version, arranged by John Debney. This contained a new introduction, being a quieter piece of music over which part of the Eighth Doctor's (Paul McGann) opening narration was read, leading into a crescendo into the "middle eight", a departure from previous versions of the theme. Debney's version of the theme begins in A minor, but after the middle eight the main melody is transposed back to E minor, as in the original score. Less evident in this version of the score is the rhythmic bassline that opens and underscores all previous (and later) televised versions of the theme; a bassline is present, but it does not rise and fall in the same way. Debney is the only composer that receives screen credit during the movie, with the by-then-deceased Grainer not being credited on screen for composing the theme. Debney at one point was almost asked to compose a new theme due to licensing issues regarding the Grainer composition.

=== 2000s ===
When Big Finish Productions began to produce Eighth Doctor audio plays in 2001 (beginning with Storm Warning), they approached composer David Arnold, who produced a new arrangement of the Doctor Who theme for the Eighth Doctor. The Arnold arrangement was used for every Eighth Doctor audio play until 2008's Dead London. They proceeded to use this theme arrangement again from 2012's Dark Eyes onward.

In 2005, the television series was revived. Murray Gold's theme arrangement featured samples from the 1963 original with further elements added: an orchestral sound of low horns, strings and percussion and part of the Dalek ray-gun and TARDIS materialisation sound effects. Rapidly rising and falling strings were added to create a counter-melody alongside the main motif.

The sting once again served as the lead-in to the theme, but Gold omitted the "middle eight" from both the opening and closing credits. Gold has said that his interpretation was driven by the title visual sequence he was given to work around. Gold created a variation on his arrangement for the closing credits of "The Christmas Invasion", which was performed by the BBC National Orchestra of Wales. Unlike his arrangement for the 2005 series, this version restored the "middle eight"; it was also used for the closing credits of the 2006 and 2007 series.

A soundtrack of Gold's incidental music for the new series was released by Silva Screen Records on 4 December 2006. Included on the album are two versions of the theme: the 44-second opening version, as arranged by Gold, and a longer arrangement that includes the middle eight. Often erroneously cited as being the same as the end credits version, this second version is in fact a new arrangement and recording. Gold also created another new arrangement of the theme which was performed by the BBC National Orchestra of Wales during a special televised concert, Doctor Who: A Celebration which was broadcast in November 2006 as part of the annual Children in Need appeal. A second soundtrack with music from the third series plus the 2007 Christmas special, Voyage of the Damned, was released on 5 November 2007.

In November 2007, following the BBC's announcement that it was requiring all series to implement a shorter closing credits sequence, Murray Gold produced a third version featuring additional drums, piano and bass guitar and a variation of the string counter-melody while retaining the original Derbyshire electronic melody line, used from the Christmas 2007 episode. The 2008 series featured a modified arrangement of this version.

In 2005, a new orchestral arrangement by Christopher Austin was commissioned by the BBC for the Blue Peter prom and performed by the BBC Philharmonic. It has also been performed by the BBC Symphony Orchestra as part of the celebration of 75 years at Maida Vale.

=== 2010s ===
From "The Eleventh Hour" the theme received a complete reworking to tie in with the new cast, production design and title sequence design. Arranged by Murray Gold, this theme, while still retaining Gold's counter-melody, has the bassline and electronic melody redone by Gold on a synthesizer. The reworking was something of a departure from all previous arrangements, with a prominent new melodic fanfare theme playing in the opening bars, and a percussion sound accenting each quaver of the rhythm. The end credits featured only a short arrangement with introductory fanfare and the final notes of the main theme. The only exception to this was at the end of "The Beast Below", where the full theme tune begins under the trailer for "Victory of the Daleks". This is the only episode with this arrangement to feature the 'middle eight'.

A leaked playlist for the 2012 Summer Olympics opening ceremony suggested that the theme would be performed, but this did not occur.

The theme and title sequence was revised yet again for the 2012 Christmas special, "The Snowmen", to coincide with a change of companion. This new piece retains the melodic fanfare of the opening bars, as well as Gold's bassline and lead – albeit with all of them modified (with the latter two's timbre modified – especially the bassline, and the lead dipping downwards during the first high B note) and lacking both the heavy use of percussion from the previous arrangement, and removing the counter-melody that featured in all previous Gold arrangements. However, for the end credits of this episode, the previous arrangement was still used. This arrangement was revised further for "The Bells of Saint John", featuring a more prominent bassline and removing the electronic beeps during the opening fanfare. The end credits were updated to use this version of the theme, now featuring the main melody repeated twice, in place of the fanfare. The ending of the opening theme was altered to incorporate some orchestral elements from the 2010–2012 version, along with some other major changes. The 'sting' is unusually quiet in this closing arrangement, often being drowned by the last seconds of the 'next time' trailer and the start of the actual theme.

A further revision of the arrangement was made for the 50th anniversary special "The Day of the Doctor". The fanfare over the opening bars was absent for the first time since 2010, and more of the electronic elements were removed or replaced (but the percussion and bassline were made more prominent, and the bass slides were re-instated as well) . The 'middle eight' section was also reinstated, for the first time since 2010's "The Beast Below".

For the 2013 Christmas special, "The Time of the Doctor", the theme used throughout series 7 part 2 was reinstated until the new theme arranged in 2014.

The arrangement of the theme was once again revised in 2014 to mark the introduction of Peter Capaldi as the twelfth incarnation of The Doctor. This version removed the opening fanfare of the 2010–2012 and 2012–13 versions, returning to the traditional opening bars with a prominent bassline, accompanied by bells and a variety of futuristic sound effects, as well as a new sting as the theme opens. This leads into the main melody, now more electronic and screech-like in homage to the Howell and Glynn themes of the 1980s. The 'middle eight' is absent from any broadcast version of the theme, and as such the closing credits cut straight to the main melody as they did in series 7 part 2. However, it was reinstated for an extended version of the theme released on the series 8 soundtrack album in May 2015.

As of the third episode of Capaldi's debut season, "Robot of Sherwood", the new 2014 theme was suddenly polished further, blending in the introduction transition sound and bass elements of the 2008 version.

In the fourth episode of the ninth series, the intro has an electric guitar playing throughout, which continues from the Doctor playing Beethoven's Fifth Symphony in the pre-introduction scene on an electric guitar.

The theme music received another revision in 2018 for Jodie Whittaker's first series as the Doctor, this time by new composer Segun Akinola. Akinola's version of the theme incorporates several elements of previous versions of the theme, including the melody line from the original 1963 version and cliffhanger "sting" introduced in 1970, remixed with newly synthesised elements and a drum-based bassline rhythm.

For the end credits of series 11 episode 6, "Demons of the Punjab," Akinola created a vocal arrangement of the theme performed by singer Shahid Abbas Khan.

=== 2020s ===
Doctor Who theme excerpt
An excerpt from a 2023 arrangement of the theme music to Doctor Who

The theme was updated slightly, with less emphasis on the melody, and more bass to the bassline. The middle 8 was once again added to the end credits, but for Ascension of the Cybermen only.

In 2021, the theme was once again updated, this time with a mix of both the Series 11 & 12 theme tunes. For Village of the Angels, the end credits dropped the bassline, to make the theme sound more eerie than usual.

For 2023, the theme was revitalised again by returning composer, Murray Gold. This rendition of the theme music returns to an orchestral sound, reminiscent of the themes from both 2005-2007 and 2007-2010. The current theme also has electronic and piano elements intertwined with the original Derbyshire theme music.

== Remixes and remakes ==
- "Embryo" was the first Pink Floyd song to contain an excerpt of the theme, appearing in live performances in 1971, although in "Embryo" only the first two bars of the theme would play, as opposed to a much longer segment in "Cymbaline". These two songs were often performed at the same concerts. "One of These Days", the opening track of Pink Floyd's 1971 album Meddle, echoes the theme about three minutes into the track. The reference was made more explicit in live performances. In addition, their song "Sheep" has a bassline very similar to the theme song's bassline and the opening three notes of the main theme are played at 06.47, whilst live performances featured a much longer excerpt of the theme.
- In 1986, BBC Records released a 7" single titled Doctor Who: Theme from the BBC-TV Series featuring the original Ron Grainer theme arranged by Dominic Glynn on side one, and Doctor Who "Cosmic Remix" by Mankind on side two. Additionally, they issued it as a three-track 12" single also including the original theme interpreted by Delia Derbyshire. The 12" vinyl outer sleeve features a 3-D hologram featuring Daleks as well as other Doctor Who villains. This release was also issued as a cassette maxi-single featuring the same tracklist, and in virtually the same 12" hologram sleeve except for a die-cut section featuring a clear plastic blister to house the cassette case.
- In 1988, The Timelords (also known as The JAMs and later The KLF) released the single "Doctorin' the TARDIS" on their own KLF Communications label. The song used samples from Doctor Who, Gary Glitter's "Rock and Roll (Part 2)", and Sweet's "Blockbuster", including samples from Genesis of the Daleks. The single reached number one in the UK Singles Chart on 12 June, and also charted highly in Australia and New Zealand. A latter USA release of the CD single by TVT Records featured an extended tracklist; including an instrumental version that was commonly played during PBS pledge drive breaks during their broadcasts of the series in the USA. Unlike the UK or European releases, this remained in print for some time after the popularity of the single among sci-fi retailers. The song, along with "Rock and Roll (Part 2)", was combined with Green Day's "Holiday" for "Dr. Who on Holiday", a track on the mash up album American Edit.
- In 1998, the Australian band FourPlay String Quartet performed a string quartet arrangement of the song to open their debut album Catgut Ya' Tongue? credited as "Theme from Dr Who".
- In 2001, English electronica duo Orbital covered the song for their sixth album The Altogether. Their cover has gone on to become regular part of their live shows and is heard as background music in the comedy film Haggard.
- In 2014 Dominic Glynn revisited his 1986 arrangement, releasing a digital four-track mini-album of remixes entitled "The Gallifrey Remixes".
- In 2017 British musician Hank Marvin, previously lead guitarist in The Shadows, recorded a cover version of the theme for his solo album Without a Word.
- In 2018 Filipino indie electro-rock band Stereodeal released their own cover version of the tune, which they also played live occasionally.
- Also in 2018, British comedian Matt Berry recorded a version of the music for his album of retro TV theme covers, Television Themes.
- There is an EP by Giuseppe Ottaviani called Doctor Who.

== See also ==
- List of Doctor Who music releases
- "Doctor in Distress"
- List of Doctor Who composers
- "Uprising" (Muse song)
