= Peter Howell (musician) =

Composer, Writer, and member of the Radiophonic Workshop

Peter Howell (born 1949) is a musician and composer. He is best known for his work on Doctor Who as a member of the BBC Radiophonic Workshop.

Howell's musical career began in the late 1960s working with John Ferdinando in various psychedelic folk bands including Agincourt and Ithaca. Howell and Ferdinando recorded five albums before Howell became a member of the Radiophonic Workshop, with which he would remain associated until its dissolution in 1997.

== Doctor Who ==
His work on Doctor Who began in 1975 when he provided some accompanying incidental music for Revenge of the Cybermen and special sound for Planet of Evil. When John Nathan-Turner became producer of Doctor Who in 1980, he decided that the music needed to be updated and commissioned Howell to provide a new arrangement of the Doctor Who theme to accompany a new title sequence. Whereas the original arrangement of the theme (written by Ron Grainer) had been realised by Delia Derbyshire (and, originally, assisted by Dick Mills) using musique concrète techniques, Howell arranged Grainer's theme on analogue synthesisers - primarily using a Yamaha CS-80, an ARP Odyssey Mk3 and a Roland Jupiter-4.

Howell's new arrangement first appeared in 1980 on The Leisure Hive, for which Howell had also recorded the incidental score, and was used throughout Tom Baker's final season on the programme as well as Peter Davison's tenure as the Doctor and Colin Baker's first season. Between 1980 and 1985 Howell also provided incidental music for ten stories of Doctor Who, as well as arranging the theme tune for K-9 and Company, composed by Ian Levine and Fiachra Trench. In 1986, Nathan-Turner commissioned a new theme arrangement by Dominic Glynn, ending Howell's association with Doctor Who on television.

Since 2013 he has been part of the Radiophonic Workshop Band, touring the UK and abroad with Radiophonic archivist Mark Ayres and other former members of the Workshop.

== Other work ==
Aside from Doctor Who, Howell's Radiophonic Workshop work includes an album of original recordings in 1978 entitled Through A Glass Darkly (credited to Peter Howell & The Radiophonic Workshop) and "Greenwich Chorus", a piece which accompanied an episode of Jonathan Miller's popular The Body in Question which was controversial at the time for its use of the vocoder. Howell composed the theme tunes to The Machine that Changed the World (1992)/The Dream Machine (UK), a 5-part television series on the history of the electronic digital computer, to Robert Hughes' 1979-80 8-part series on Modern art (The Shock of the New), and to the Badger Girl and Spywatch series of the long-running BBC schools' programme, Look and Read.

Howell was responsible for the BBC Video logo's music in 1984.

In 1986, Howell composed music for the BBC children's TV show The Children Of Green Knowe.

For the 1987 film Life Story, Howell took over the music "Grand Choral" from the film Day for Night, which Georges Delerue had composed.

== Most recently ==
In recent years Howell's incidental music for the Doctor Who stories The Leisure Hive and Meglos has appeared on volumes 3 and 4 of the Doctor Who at the BBC Radiophonic Workshop compilation albums, and much of his back catalogue, including his early folk material with John Ferdinando has also been re-released on CD.

In 2021, Howell published his autobiography Radiophonic Times via Obverse Books.
