= Video synthesizer =

Device that electronically creates a video signal

A video synthesizer (bottom) being operated which creates video images (top)

Video images created by a video synthesizer across multiple television sets.

A video synthesizer is a device that electronically creates a video signal. A video synthesizer is able to generate a variety of visual material without camera input through the use of internal video pattern generators. It can also accept and "clean up and enhance" or "distort" live television camera imagery. The synthesizer creates a wide range of imagery through purely electronic manipulations. This imagery is visible within the output video signal when this signal is displayed. The output video signal can be viewed on a wide range of conventional video equipment, such as TV monitors, theater video projectors, computer displays, etc. Video pattern generators may produce static or moving or evolving imagery. Examples include geometric patterns (in 2D or 3D), subtitle text characters in a particular font, or weather maps. Imagery from TV cameras can be altered in color or geometrically scaled, tilted, wrapped around objects, and otherwise manipulated. A particular video synthesizer will offer a subset of possible effects. Video synthesizers are often used for music visualization.

== Real-time performance instruments ==
Video generated by an LZX video synthesizer setup reacting as a music visualization as live background for a musical band

The history of video synthesis is tied to a "real time performance" ethic. The equipment is usually expected to function on input camera signals the machine has never seen before, delivering a processed signal continuously and with a minimum of delay in response to the ever-changing live video inputs. Following in the tradition of performance instruments of the audio synthesis world such as the Theremin, video synthesizers were designed with the expectation they would be played in live concert theatrical situations or set up in a studio ready to process a videotape from a playback VCR in real time while recording the results on a second VCR. Venues of these performances included "Electronic Visualization Events" in Chicago, The Kitchen in NYC, and museum installations. Video artist/performer Don Slepian designed, built and performed a foot-controlled Visual Instrument at the Centre Pompidou in Paris (1983) and the NY Open Center that combined genlocked early micro-computers Apple II Plus with the Chromaton 14 Video Synthesizer. and channels of colorized video feedback.

Analog and early real time digital synthesizers existed before modern computer 3D modeling. Typical 3D renderers are not real time, as they concentrate on computing each frame from, for example, a recursive ray tracing algorithm, however long it takes. This distinguishes them from video synthesizers, which must deliver a new output frame by the time the last one has been shown, and repeat this performance continuously (typically delivering a new frame regularly every 1/60 or 1/50 of a second). The real time constraint results in a difference in design philosophy between these two classes of systems.

Video synthesizers overlap with video special effects equipment used in real time network television broadcast and post-production situations. Many innovations in television broadcast equipment as well as computer graphics displays evolved from synthesizers developed in the video artists' community and these industries often support "electronic art projects" in this area to show appreciation of this history.

== Confluence of ideas of electronics and arts ==
Many principles used in the construction of early video synthesizers reflected a healthy and dynamic interplay between electronic requirements and traditional interpretations of artistic forms. For example, Steve Rutt, Bill Etra and Daniel Sandin adopted Robert Moog's principle of standardized signal ranges so that any module's output could be connected to "voltage control" any other module's input. The consequence of this in a machine like the Rutt-Etra was that position, brightness, and color were completely interchangeable and could be used to modulate each other during the processing that led to the final image. Videotapes by Louise and Bill Etra and Steina and Woody Vasulka dramatized this new class of effects. This led to various interpretations of the multi-modal synesthesia of these aspects of the image in dialogues that extended the McLuhanesque language of film criticism of the time.

=== EMS Spectron ===
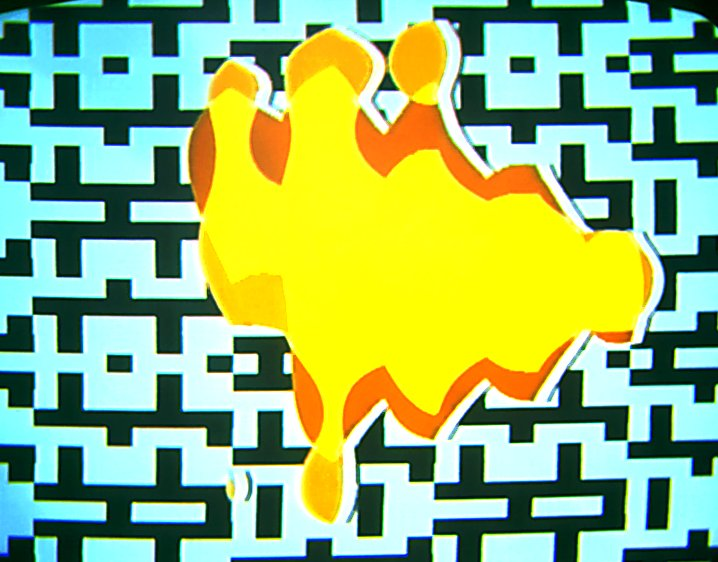
Image produced by Spectre video synthesizer

In the UK, Richard Monkhouse, working for Electronic Music Studios (London) Limited (EMS), developed a hybrid video synthesiser – Spectre – later renamed 'Spectron' which used the EMS patchboard system to allow completely flexible connections between module inputs and outputs. The video signals were digital, but they were controlled by analog voltages. There was a digital patchboard for image composition and an analog patchboard for motion control.

== Evolution into frame buffers ==
Video synthesizers moved from analog to the precision control of digital. The first digital effects as exemplified by Stephen Beck's Video Weavings used digital oscillators optionally linked to horizontal, vertical, or frame resets to generate timing ramps. These ramps could be gated to create the video image itself and were responsible for its underlying geometric texture. Schier and Vasulka advanced the state of the art from address counters to programmable (microcodable) AMD Am2901 bit slice based address generators. On the data path, they used 74S181 arithmetic and logic units, previously thought of as a component for doing arithmetic instructions in minicomputers, to process real time video signals, creating new signals representing the sum, difference, AND, XOR, and so on, of two input signals. These two elements, the address generator, and the video data pipeline, recur as core features of digital video architecture.

The address generator supplied read and write addresses to a real time video memory, which can be thought of as evolution into the most flexible form of gating the address bits together to produce the video. While the video frame buffer is now present in every computer's graphics card, it has not carried forward a number of features of the early video synths. The address generator counts in a fixed rectangular pattern from the upper left hand corner of the screen, across each line, to the bottom. This discarded a whole technology of modifying the image by variations in the read and write addressing sequence provided by the hardware address generators as the image passed through the memory. Today, address based distortions are more often accomplished by blitter operations moving data in the memory, rather than changes in video hardware addressing patterns.

== History ==
=== 1960s ===
- 1962, Lee Harrison III's ANIMAC: (Hybrid graphic animation computer) – predecessor to the Scanimate
- 1966, Dan Slater's custom vsynths: Dan Slater has built a number of custom homebrew vsynths over the years and worked with Douglas Trumbull on various films.
- 1968, Eric Siegel's PCS (Processing Chrominance Synthesizer)
- 1968, Computer Image Corporation Scanimate:
  - Video of a News Report on Scanimate, including interview with inventor Lee Harrison III
- 1969, Paik/Abe synthesizer
  - Built at WGBH Boston Experimental TV Center envisioned by Nam June Paik, designed by artist/engineer Shuya Abe.
  - Several built at CalArts, and Experimental TV Center Binghamton University, WNET NYC;
- 1969, Bill Hearn's VIDIUM: (Analog XYZ driver/sequencer)
- 1969, Glen Southworth's CVI Quantizer and CVI Data Camera

=== 1970–1974 ===
- 1970, Eric Siegel's EVS Electronic Video Synthesizer and Dual Colorizer (Analog)
- 1970, groove & VAmpire
  - (generated real-time output operations on voltage-controlled equipment)
  - (video and music program for interactive realtime exploration/experimentation).
- 1970, Lear Siegler's vsynth: unique high-resolution video processor used in the film The Andromeda Strain and by Douglas Trumbull and Dan Slater
- Stephen Beck's Direct Video Synth and Beck Video Weaver
  - Stephen Beck created some early 1970s synths that had no video inputs. They made video purely from oscillations.
  - He also modified a few Paik/Abe units.
- Walter Wright: one of the first video animators, in the early 1970s, he worked at Dolphin Productions a Division of Computer Image Corporation, where he operated a Scanimate. While at Dolphin, he worked with Ed Emshwiller on Thermogenisis and Scapemates. He also made several tapes on his own. In 1973–1976, as artist-in-residence at the Experimental Television Center, New York, he pioneered video performance touring public access centers, colleges and galleries with the Paik/Abe video synthesizer. He also worked with the David Jones colorizer and Rich Brewster's sequencing modules. These various modules were based on David's design for voltage-controlled video amps and became the basis for the ETC studio. He was there when Don McArthur built the SAID. Woody Vasulka and Jeff Schier were close at hand building computer-based modules in Buffalo including a frame buffer with ALUs built in, mixers, keyers and colorizers. Wright also worked with Gary Hill at Woodstock Community Video, where they had a weekly cable show of live video/audio synthesis. Wright has developed his own performance video system, the Video Shredder, and uses it in performances with a mission to create a new music of sound and image. He has performed throughout the east coast of the US and Canada at art galleries and museums, schools and colleges, media centers, conferences and festivals.

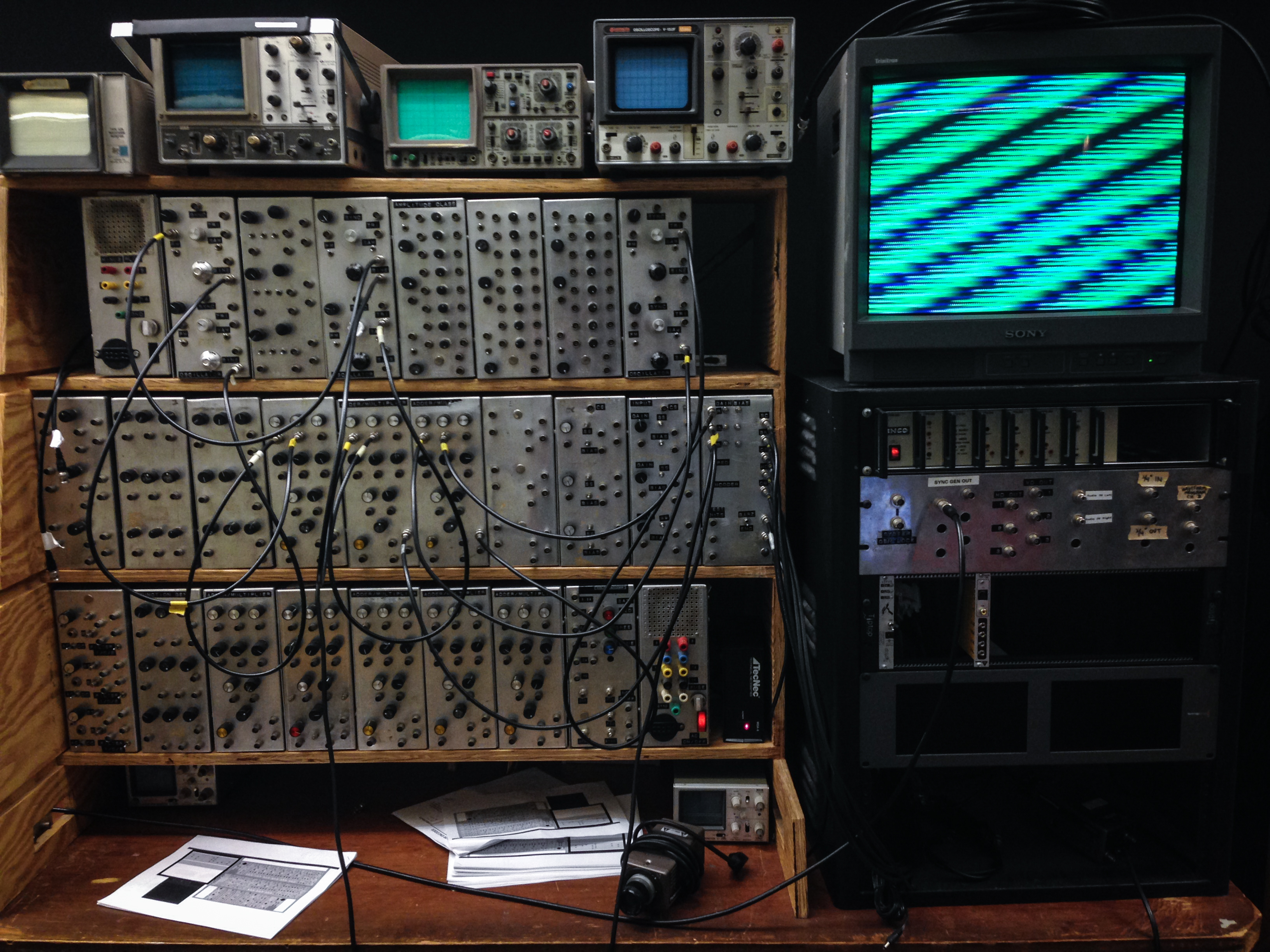
The 1971 Sandin Image Processor

- 1971, Sandin Image Processor: very early video synth, DIY modular, built by Dan Sandin of Chicago.
- 1972, Rutt/Etra Video Synthesizer: co-invented by Steve Rutt and Bill Etra; this is an analog computer for video raster manipulation.
- 1973, Phil Morton publishes "Notes on the Aesthetics of Copying an Image Processor". He "proudly referred to himself as the ‘first copier’ of Sandin's Image Processor. The Sandin Image Processor offered artists unprecedented abilities to create, process and affect realtime video and audio, enabling performances that literally set the stage for current real-time audio-video New Media Art."
- 1974, Videosynths' by David Jones: many creations, the most famous being the Jones Colorizer, a four channel voltage controllable colorizer with gray level keyers.
- 1974, EMS Spectre: Innovative video synthesiser using analogue and digital techniques, developed by Richard Monkhouse at EMS. Later renamed to 'Spectron'.

=== 1975–1979 ===
Output from an Atari Video Music, with music from 2018

- 1975, Dave Jones Video Digitizer: an early digital video processor used for video art. It did real-time digitizing (no sample clock) and used a 4-bit ALU to create color effects
- 1975, Don McArthur's SAID: Don McArthur developed the SAID (Spatial and Intensity Digitizer), an outgrowth of research on a black and white time base corrector with Dave Jones
- 1976, Denise Gallant's vsynth: created a very advanced analogue video synthesizer in the late 1970s.
- 1976, Chromaton 14
  - A fairly small analog video synthesizer with color quantizers and which can generate complex color images without any external inputs.
  - Built by BJA Systems
- Atari Video Music
- 1977, Jones Frame Buffer: low-resolution digital frame storage of video signals (higher resolution versions, and multi-frame versions were made in 1979 and the early 1980s)
- 1979, Chromachron: one of the first DIGITAL VSynths – designed by Ed Tannenbaum.
- 1979, Chromascope Video Synthesizer, PAL and NTSC versions. Created by Robin Palmer. Manufactured by Chromatronics, Essex, UK. Distribution by CEL Electronics. Model P135 (2,000 units built) and Model C.101 (100 units built).

=== 1980s ===
- 1984, Fairlight CVI Computer Video Instrument: The Fairlight CVI was produced in the early 1980s, and is a hybrid analog-digital video processor.

=== 1990s ===
- Playstation (console) had a 'soundscope' functionality as a music visualizer.

=== 2000s–2020s ===
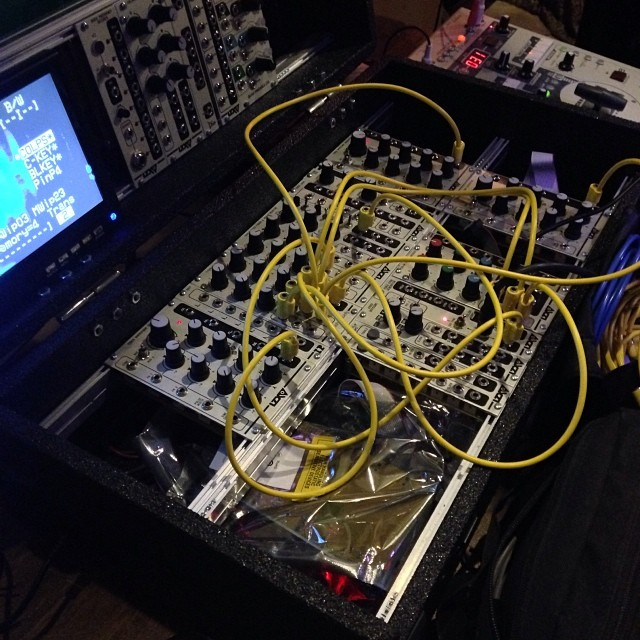
LZX modular video synthesizer in work.

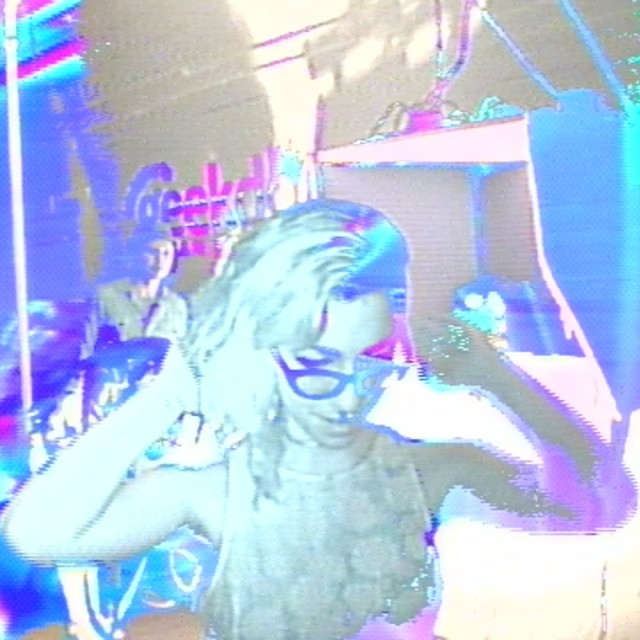
A sample of processed video image.

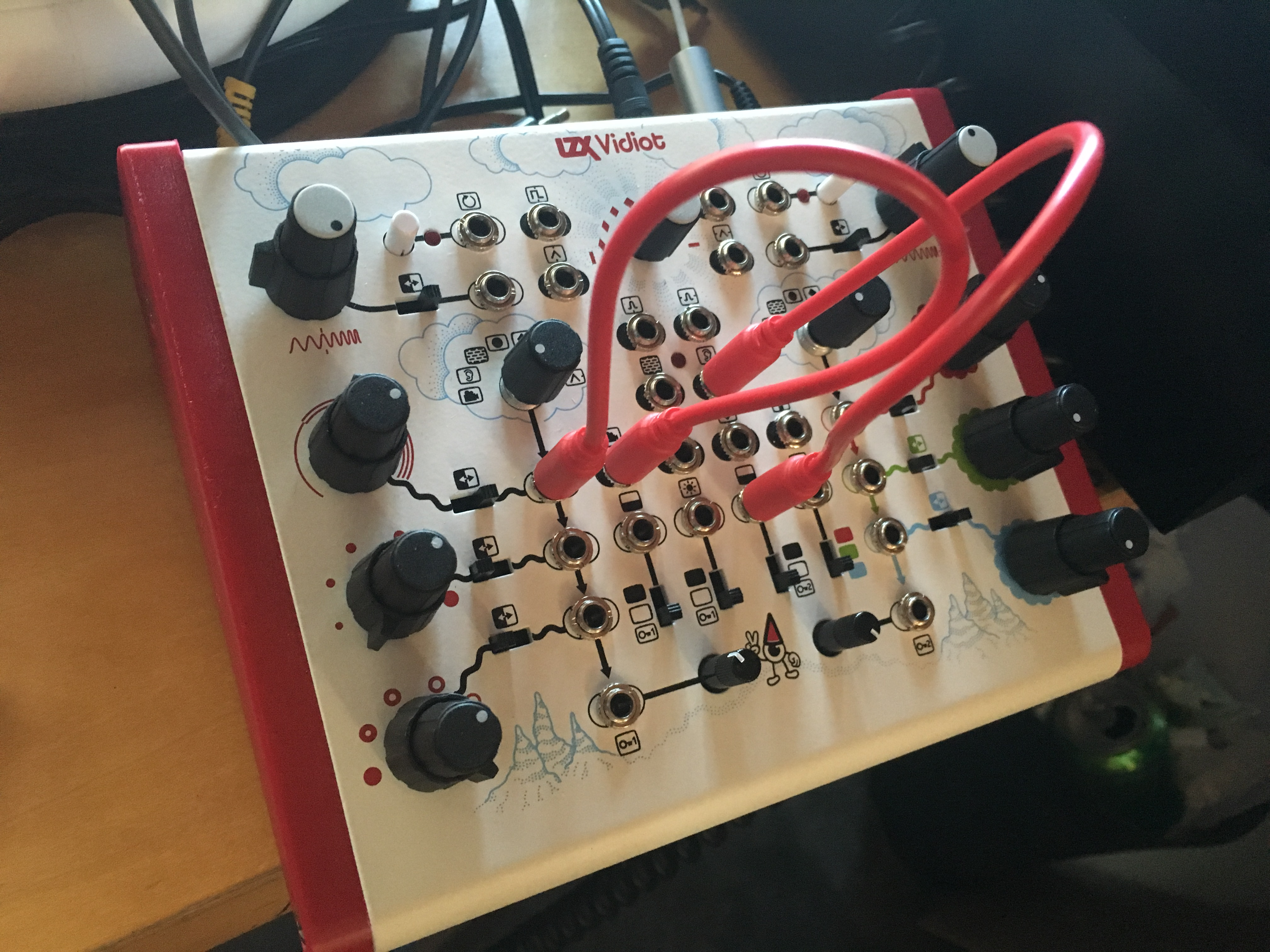
An LZX 'Vidiot'

Video synth footage

An LZX video synth video

- 2008, Lars Larsen and Ed Leckie founded LZX Industries and began developing new analog video synthesizer modules (Visionary, Cadet, and Expedition Series).
- 2010, Milkymist One
- 2011, Critter & Guitari Video Scope: preset video synthesizer.
- 2013, Critter & Guitari Rhythm Scope: preset video synthesizer.
- 2014, Critter & Guitari Black & White Video Scope: preset video synthesizer.
- 2014, Ming Mecca: modular pixel-art-oriented analog video synth
- 2015, CFOGE Video Equations: procedurally generated digital video synth.
- 2016, Paracosm Lumen: semi-modular software video synth for MacOS.
- 2016, Vsynth: a modular video synthesizer package for Max/Jitter by Kevin Kripper.
- 2016, Ming Micro: pixel-art-oriented digital video synth
- 2017, Critter & Guitari ETC: video synthesizer that supports 720p output.
- 2021, Critter & Guitari EYESY: video synthesizer that supports 1080p output, MIDI input and programming.
- 2022, Blittertech Waveblitter: audio-reactive video synthesizer, b/w composite video output in PAL or NTSC.
- 2023, Blittertech Waveblitter Color: audio-reactive video synthesizer with inbuilt video player, composite video output in PAL or NTSC.
- 2026 LZX Videomancer

== Other video synthesizers ==
Workshop on video synthesis - Stephane Lefrancois and the LZX Industries Visual Cortex

- Electro-Harmonix' Light Tube
- Image Articulator (Vasulka, Schier, Dosch) real-time digital data ops by S181 addressing by Am2901
- Neon
- Video Toaster for Amiga computer
- Virtual Light Machine

== See also ==
- VJ (video performance artist)
- Audiovisual art
- Music visualization
- Video art
- Raster scan
