= Electronic Music Studios =

British synthesizer company

Electronic Music Studios (EMS) is an English synthesiser company founded in Putney, London in 1969 by Peter Zinovieff, Tristram Cary and David Cockerell. It is now based in Ladock, Cornwall.

== Founders ==
The founding partners had wide experience in both electronics and music. Cockerell, who was EMS' main equipment designer in its early years, was an electronics engineer and computer programmer. In the mid-1960s Zinovieff had formed the electronic music group Unit Delta Plus with Delia Derbyshire and Brian Hodgson of the BBC Radiophonic Workshop. Cary was a noted composer and a pioneer in electronic music; he was one of the first people in the UK to work in the musique concrète and built one of the country's first electronic music studios. He also worked widely in film and TV, composing scores for numerous Ealing Studios and Hammer Films productions, and he is well known for his work on the BBC's Doctor Who, notably on the serial The Daleks.

== VCS 3 ==
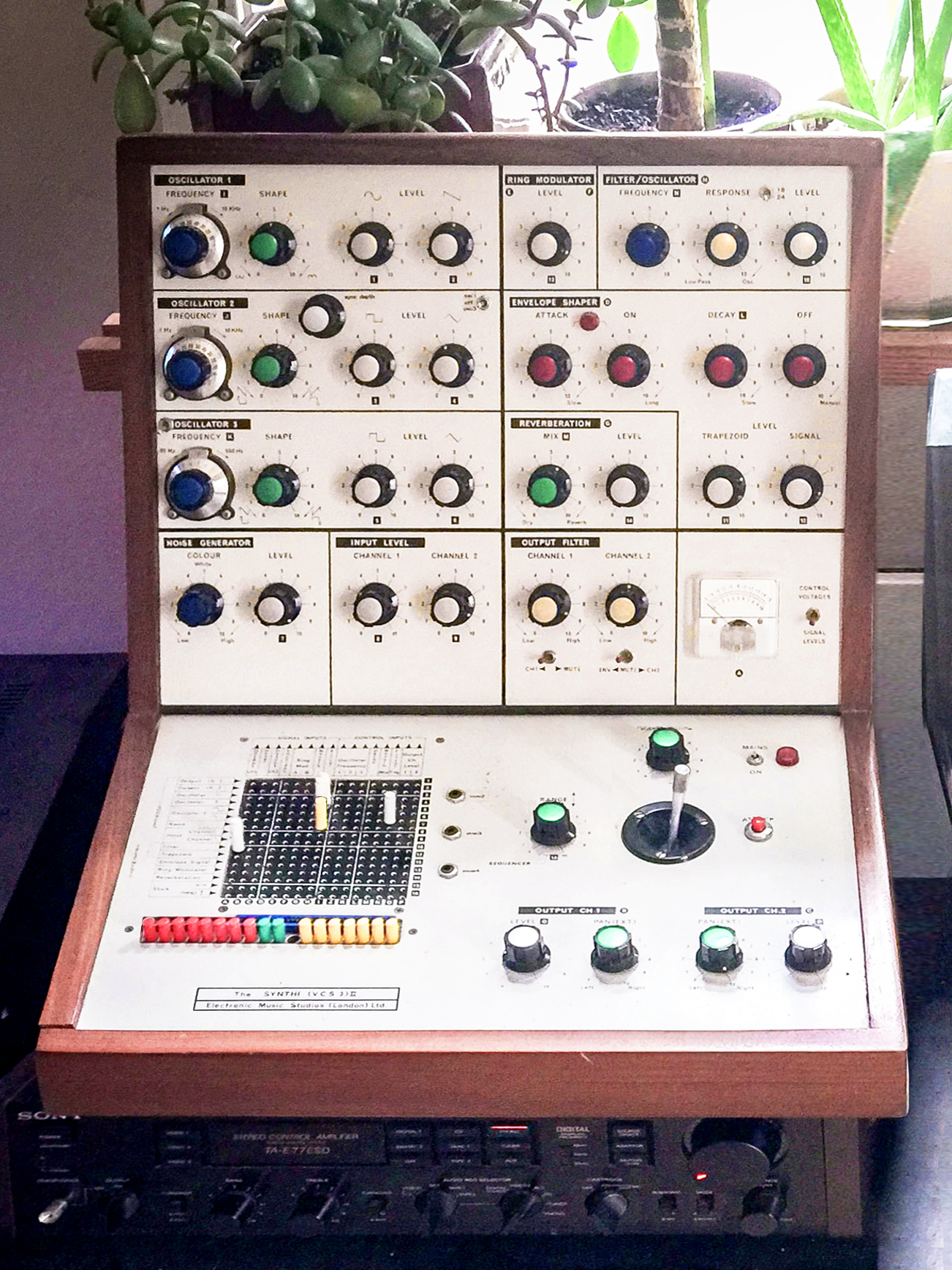
Front view of the Synthi (VCS 3) II: [top left] three main oscillators, noise generator and inputs; [top right] filter/oscillator, envelope, reverb., ring mod., etc.; [bottom left] matrix plugboard; [bottom right] joystick; (DK1 keyboard not shown)

The company's first commercial synthesiser, the VCS 3, was introduced in 1969. Designed by David Cockerell, it was developed in the basement of Zinovieff's house and nicknamed "The Putney" after the London suburb where he lived.

The VCS3 consisted of 3 voltage-controlled oscillators (VCOs), a noise generator, two input amplifiers, ring modulator, voltage-controlled low-pass filter, trapezoid envelope generator, voltage-controlled reverberation, level meter, two output amplifiers thus providing a stereo output, and a joystick providing 'X' and 'Y' modulation control.

A distinctive design feature of the VCS3 (and later EMS systems) was that, rather than using patch cords to route audio and control signals between modules, Cockerell employed a small matrix plugboard (patchboard) into which the user stuck special conductive pins that connected an input (listed on the X-axis of the matrix) to an output (on the Y-axis). This matrix plugboard gave the VCS3 a high degree of inter-connectivity, comparable to that of much larger modular systems, and far greater than similar small synthesisers like the Minimoog. It was also much easier to examine than the tangle of patch cords used to interconnect other modular systems of the day, such as the Moog modular synthesizer and was many times smaller than the cumbersome Moog patch bays, which used patch cord leads capped with 1/4-inch 'phone' jacks.

EMS' original aim was to create a versatile monophonic synthesiser that would retail for just £100. While this proved unattainable in practice, the company nevertheless succeeded in manufacturing and selling the VCS3 for just £330, less than its nearest American competitor the Minimoog (which originally retailed for US$1495 when released in 1970) and far cheaper than Moog's modular systems. EMS also released the DK1, a velocity sensitive dynamic monophonic keyboard controller for use with VCS3; this included an extra VCO and VCA and retailed for £145. The DK1 was nicknamed "The Cricklewood" after the London suburb where Cockerell lived. It is not widely known that EMS electronic equipment was mostly made by another company "Hilton Electronics" based in Wareham, Dorset.

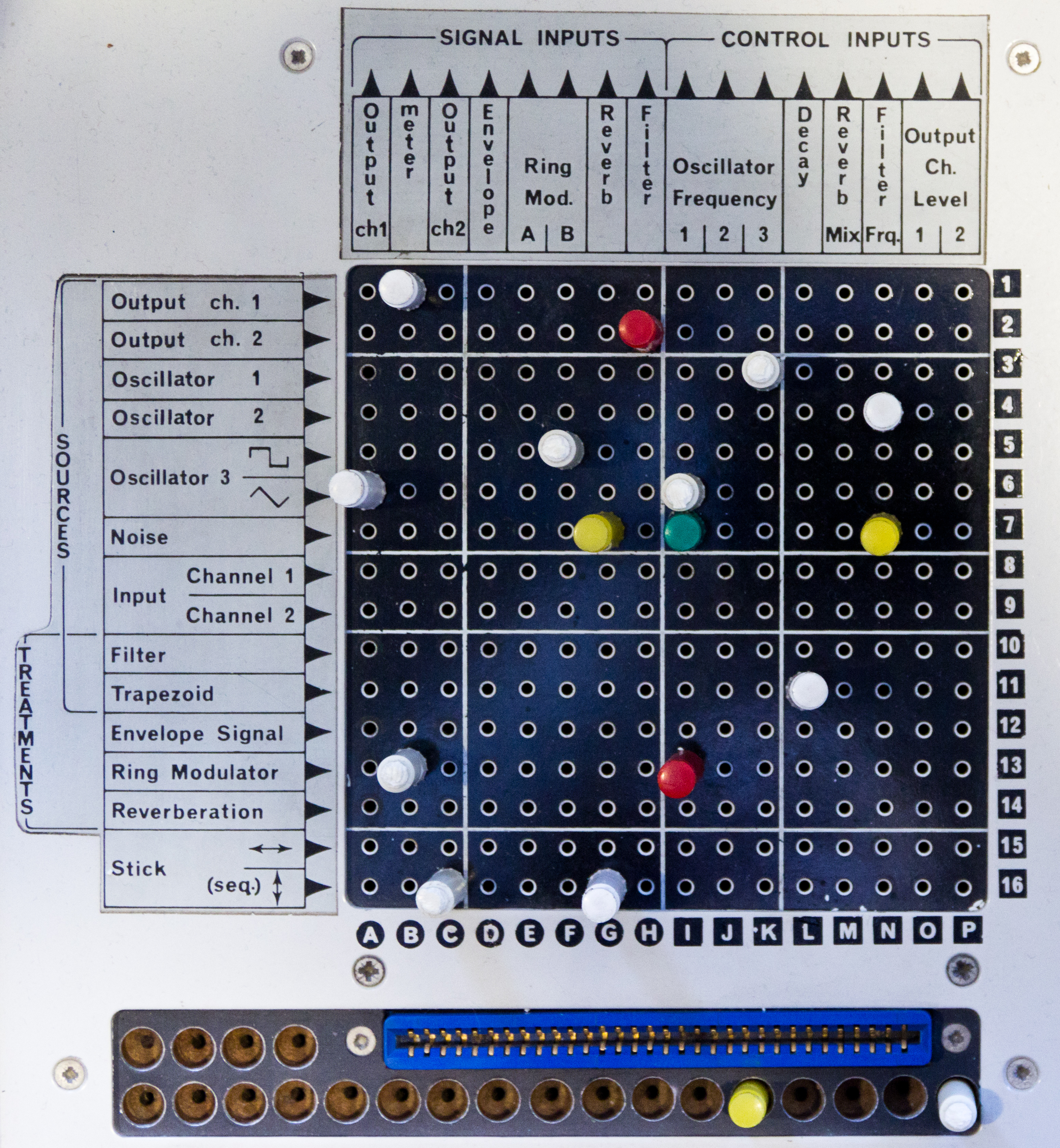
Matrix plugboard on Synthi VCS 3 II

A live performance version, the VCS4, was built later the same year but was never put into production. It comprised two VCS3s side-by-side with a keyboard, mixer and signal processing in front, all in a single wooden cabinet. Although EMS lost track of the instrument in 1983, it survived and in the United States, until 2019 when musician Simon Desorgher sold it to the Goldsmiths, University of London Electronic Music Studios.

The company's next project, the Synthi KB1 (1970), designed by Cockerell, also never went into production. It featured the same synthesis modules as the VCS3, but housed in a horizontal box casing, with a 29-note mini-keyboard controller and two small built in speakers. Only one prototype unit was built and this was subsequently sold to the progressive rock group Yes.

== Synthi 100 ==
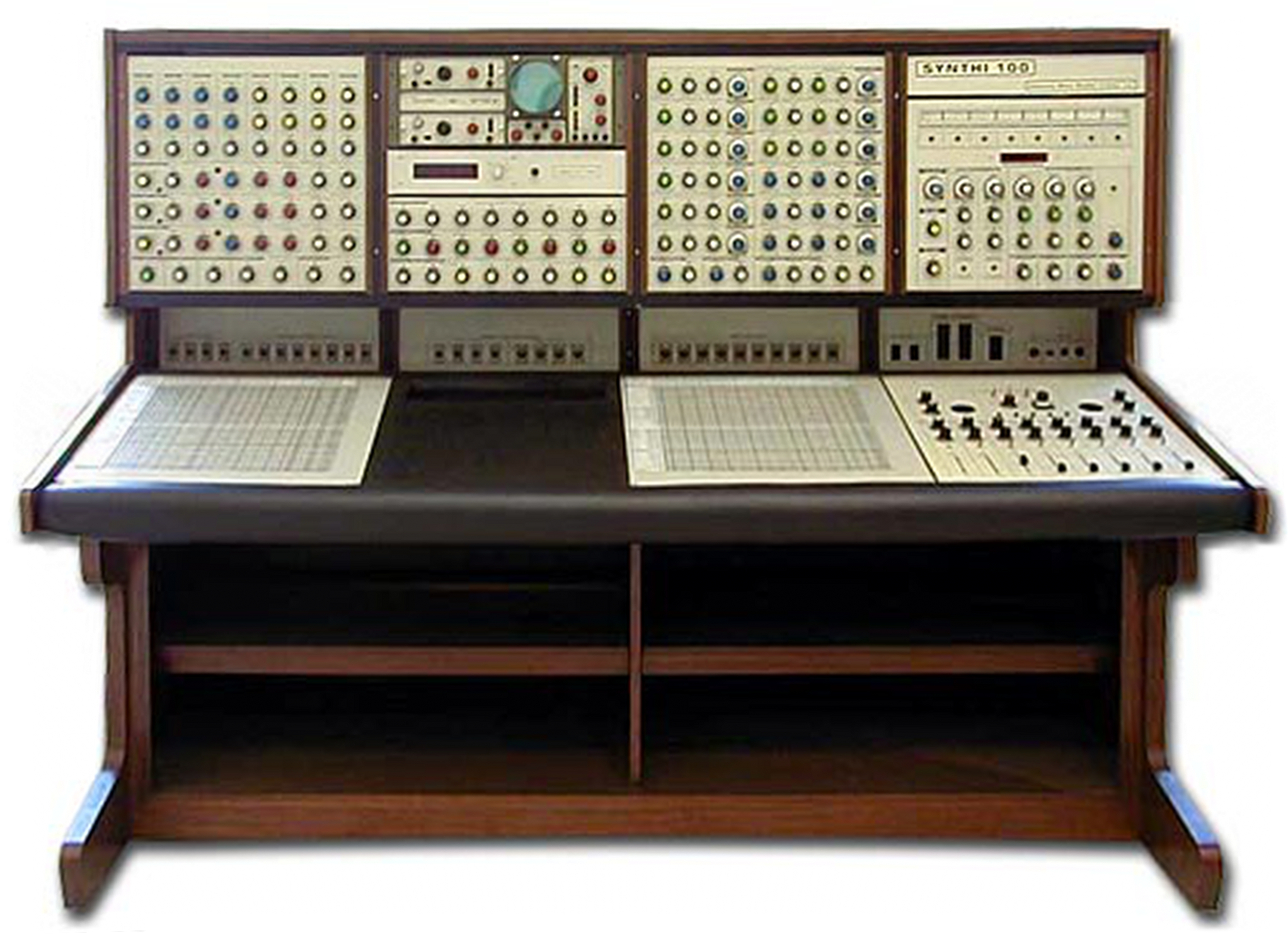
EMS Synthi 100

EMS moved into direct competition with Moog in 1971 with the development of its first large-scale modular synthesiser, the "Synthi 100", which originally retailed for £6,500. This unit was first known as the "Digitana" another was later dubbed "The Delaware", after Delaware Rd, Maida Vale, the location of the BBC Radiophonic Workshop. Mounted in a free-standing console cabinet, the Synthi 100 was the third development level of the original VCS3, being in essence 28 VCS3 units by circuit board count. It was driven by twelve VCOs and eight VCF oscillators. Featured a built-in oscilloscope, two 60 x 60 patchbays, two joystick controllers, dual five-octave velocity-sensitive keyboard controllers and a 10,000 clock event with 6x6bit D/A outputs. e.g. 256 duophonic events (512 CV events) digital sequencer. About 30 units were built by EMS, and these enjoyed wide use in the 1970s and beyond; one model was sold to the BBC Radiophonic Workshop and was used extensively on BBC productions including Doctor Who, Blake's 7 and the original radio version of The Hitchhikers' Guide to the Galaxy. The sequencer module of the Synthi 100 was also made available as a separate unit, the Synthi Sequencer 256, which originally sold for £1,100.

== Synthi A / Synthi AK / Synthi AKS ==
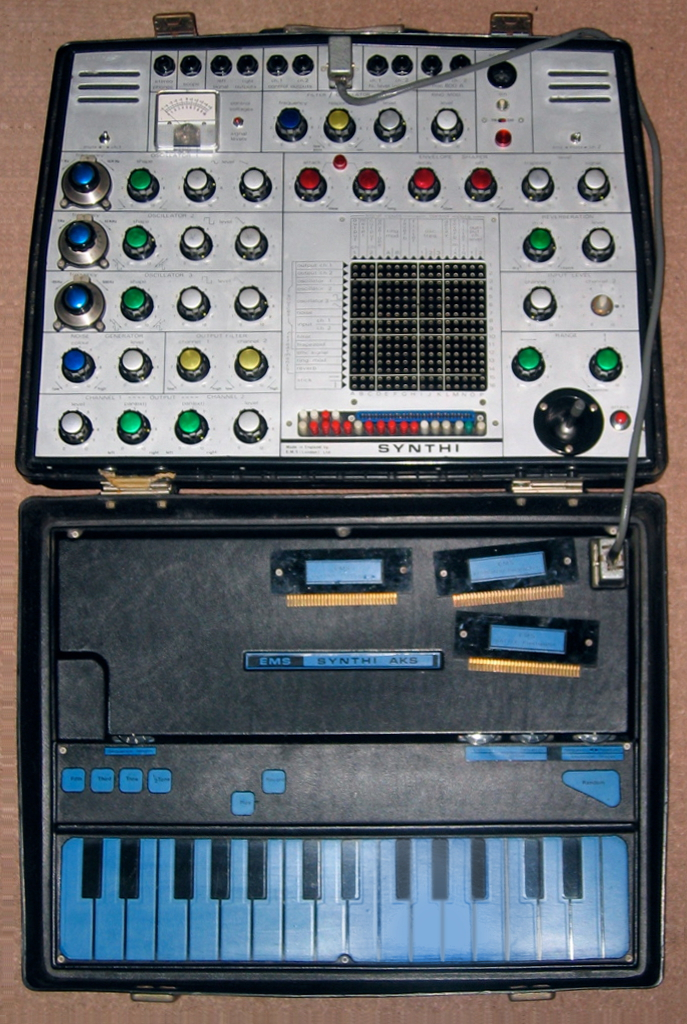
A later-model, Synthi AKS equips built-in KS Sequencer with capacitive keyboard

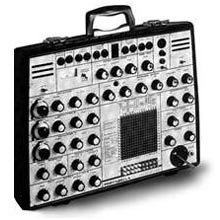
The prototype "Portabella" Synthi A with built-in speakers

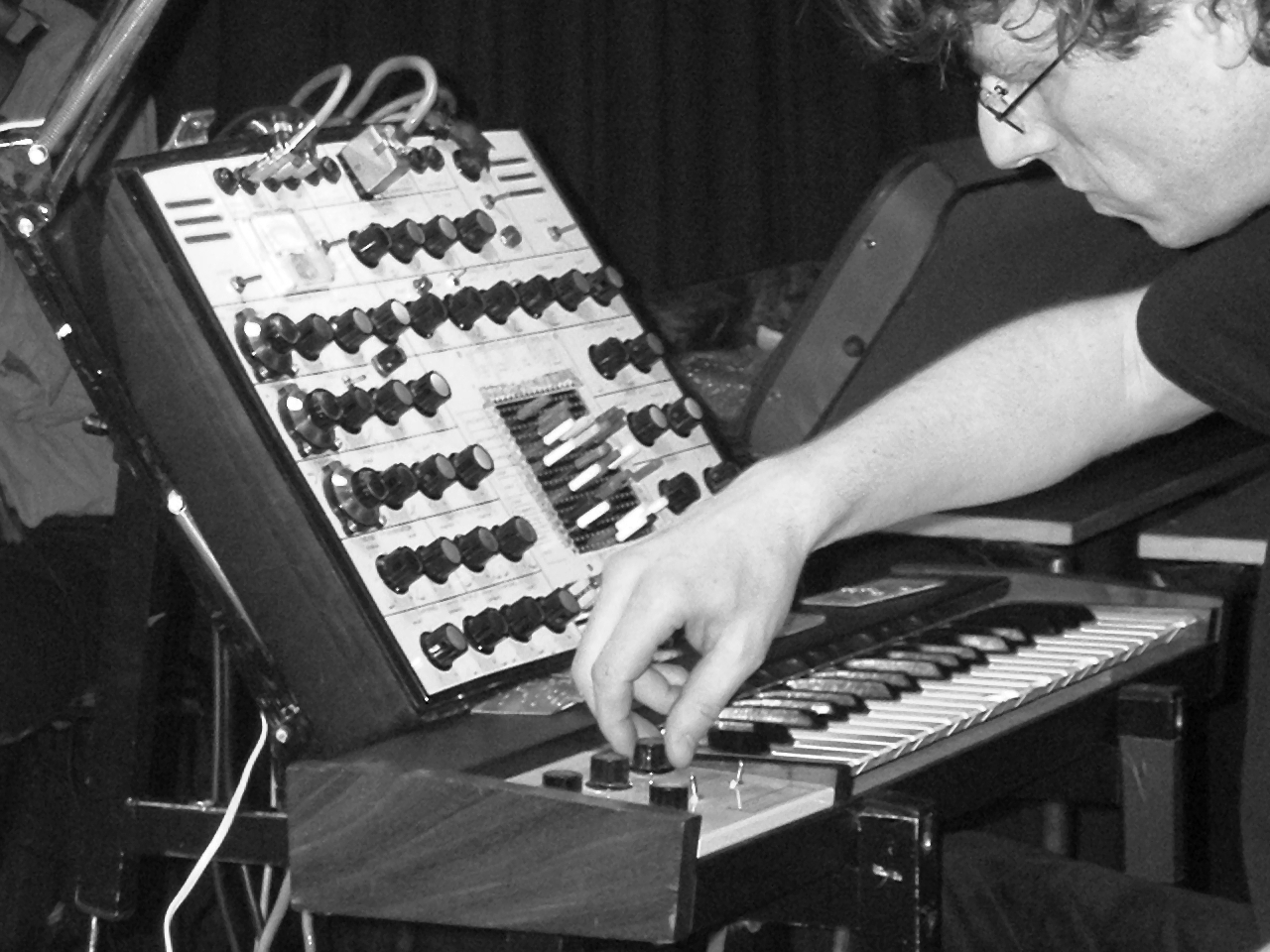
Synthi A with DK series keyboard

In 1971 EMS released a portable version of the VCS3, the EMS Synthi A, originally called the "Portabella", a pun on London's Portobello Road. Built into a compact Spartanite attaché case, this unit was even cheaper than the original VCS3 and retailed for just £198. The following year EMS released an expanded version, the Synthi AKS, which retailed for £420 and featured a sequencer and a small keyboard built into the lid. The first 30 AK units featured a black and silver touch pad, a Spin-and-touch random note selector and a resistive touch-sensitive keyboard; these original keyboards proved difficult to use, so they were subsequently replaced with blue capacitive touch-sensitive keyboard with integrated sequencer, and became known as the KS version.

The Synthi AKS proved very popular and AKS units owned by Eno, Pink Floyd and Jean-Michel Jarre featured prominently in music by these artists in the early 1970s; one of the best-known appearances of an AKS on record is the track "On the Run" from Pink Floyd's The Dark Side of the Moon (1973), and it can be seen being used by Roger Waters and David Gilmour during the recording of the album in footage included in the 1st Director's Cut of Live at Pompeii and in the DSOTM episode of the BBC documentary series Classic Albums, respectively.

== In music and the media ==
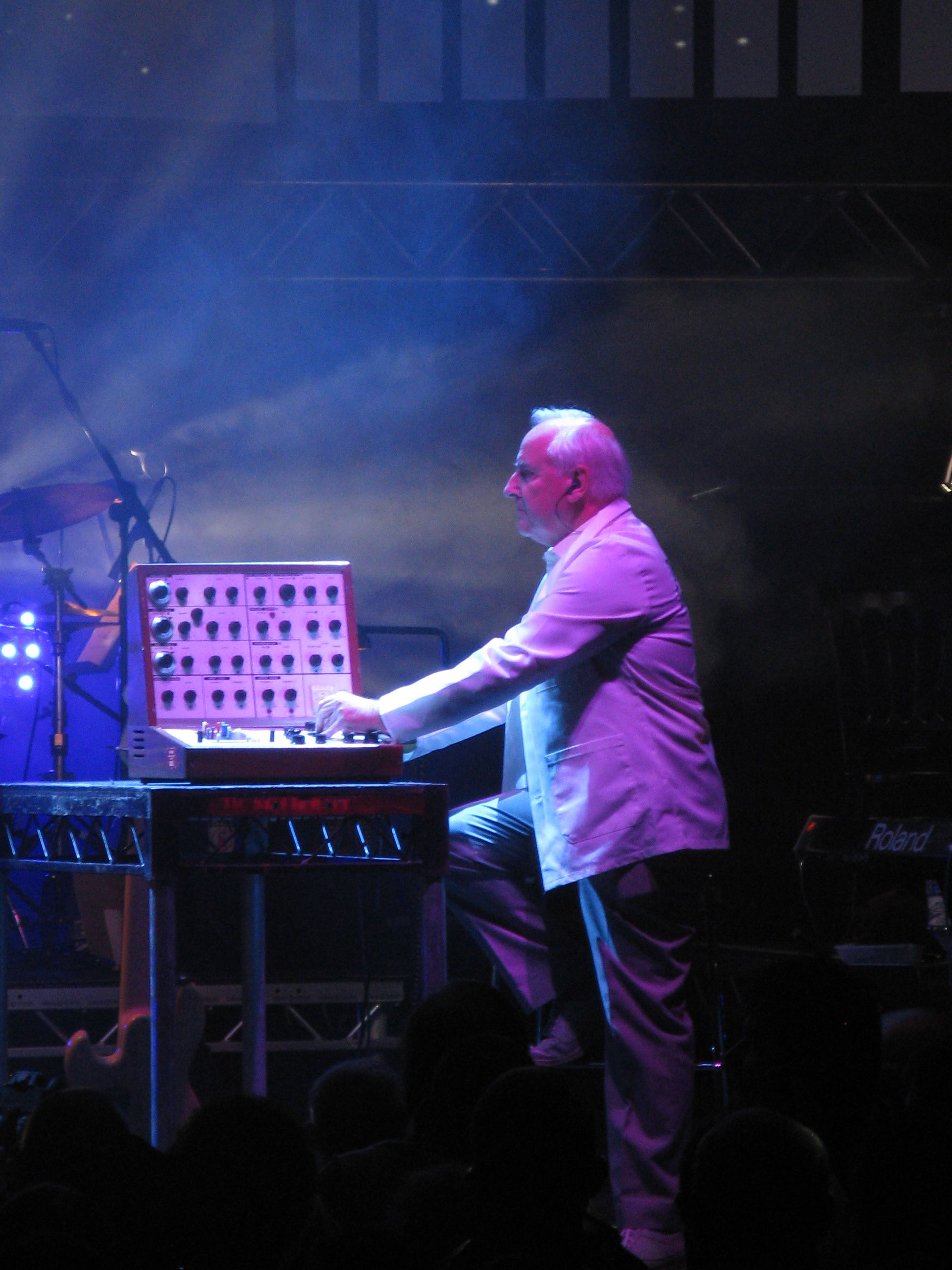
Dick Mills, BBC Radiophonic Workshop at the Roundhouse

EMS synthesisers and their London studios were used by many prominent rock and electronic artists including Pink Floyd (Meddle, Obscured by Clouds, The Dark Side of the Moon, Wish You Were Here, Animals, The Wall), The Who (Won't Get Fooled Again), BBC Radiophonic Workshop, Brian Eno and Roxy Music, Tangerine Dream (all early albums), Hawkwind, Tim Blake, Jean Michel Jarre and Kraftwerk and David Vorhaus (White Noise 2). As noted above, the Synthi 100 "Delaware" owned by the Radiophonic Workshop was used extensively for BBC radio and television productions in the 1970s.

The EMS Synthi Hi-Fli analog multi effect processor was used extensively by Tony TS Mcphee of The Groundhogs and was used on the album SOLID in 1974. Footage exists of them live at the Marquee Club in London and it is clearly visible on its stand on stage. This footage was broadcast on The Old Grey Whistle Test in 1974.

In late 2010 Zinovieff put his original Synthi A synthesiser (serial number 4016) up for sale. This instrument, which he believes was the one featured in the "Every Picnic Needs a Synthi" press advertisement, was fully restored by Robin Wood at EMS.

EMS equipment can be seen in the 1978 horror film The Shout starring Alan Bates, John Hurt and Susannah York, the equipment featured includes a Synthi Sequencer 256, a Vocoder 2000 and a VCS3, the film is available on DVD (Network 79527630), the equipment was loaned to "The Rank Organisation" by Dartington College in Devon, and the featured Synthi Sequencer 256 was recently sold on the "Vintage Electronic Musical Instrument Auction" VEMIA website in April 2011.

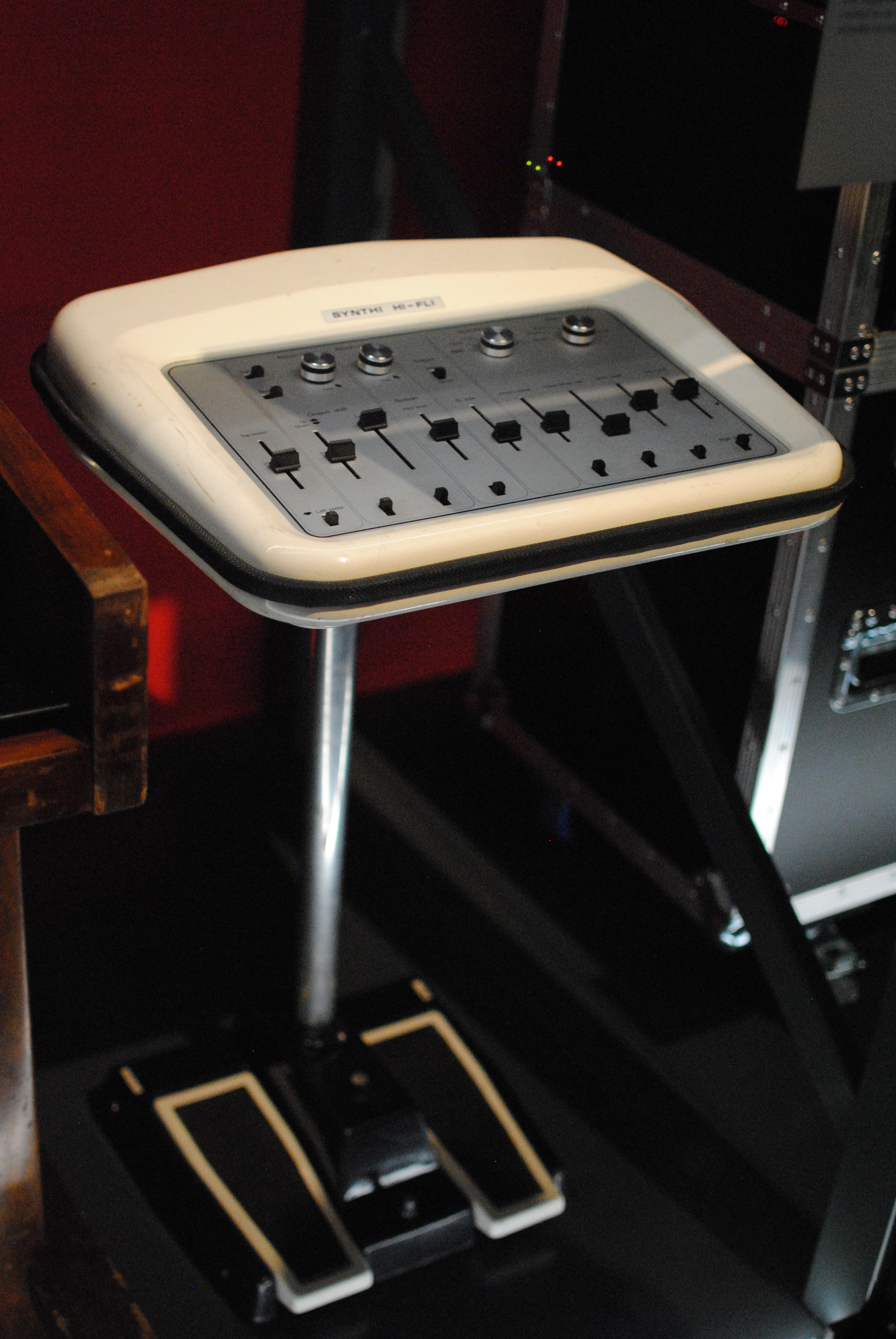
David Gilmour's 'EMS Synthi Hi-Fli' (aka 'The Sound Freak'), purchased 1972, used on The Dark Side of the Moon

== Timeline of major products ==
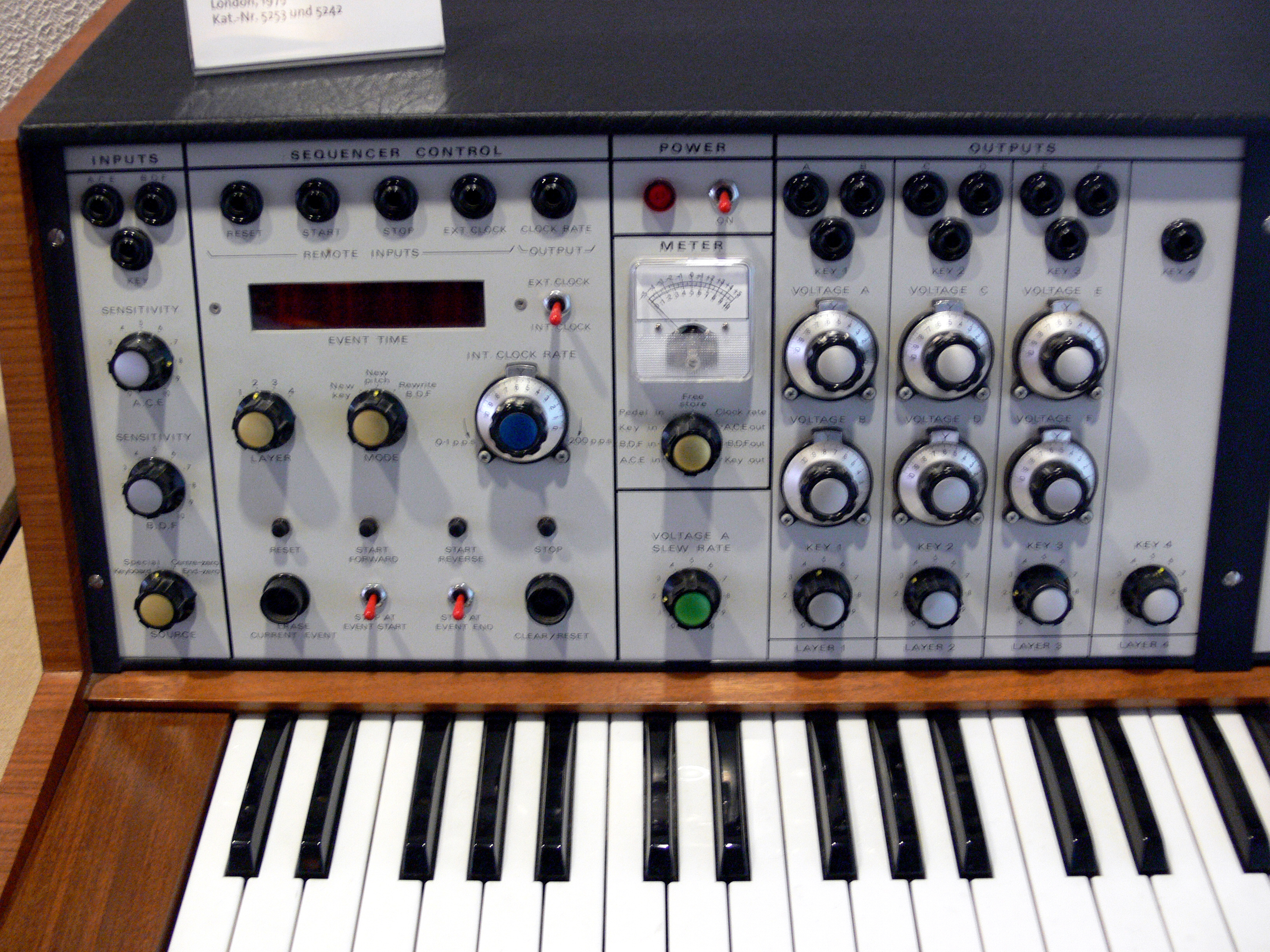
EMS Synthi Sequencer 256 (1971) panel

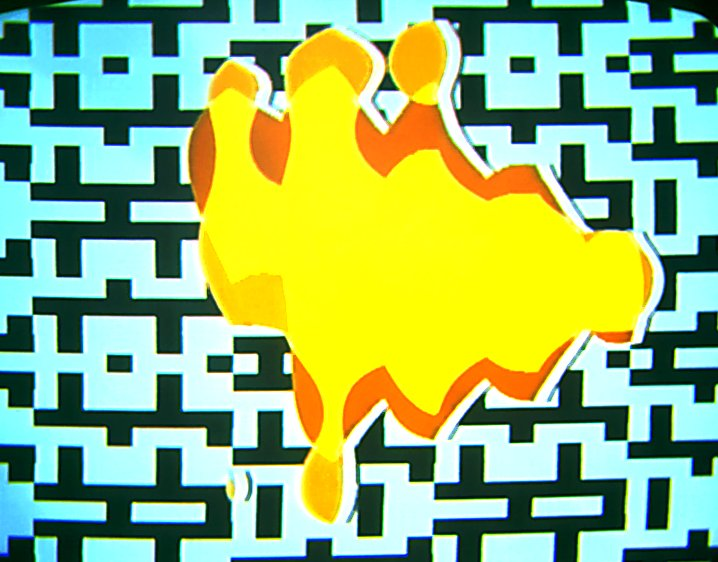
EMS Spectron (1974) video-synthesized image

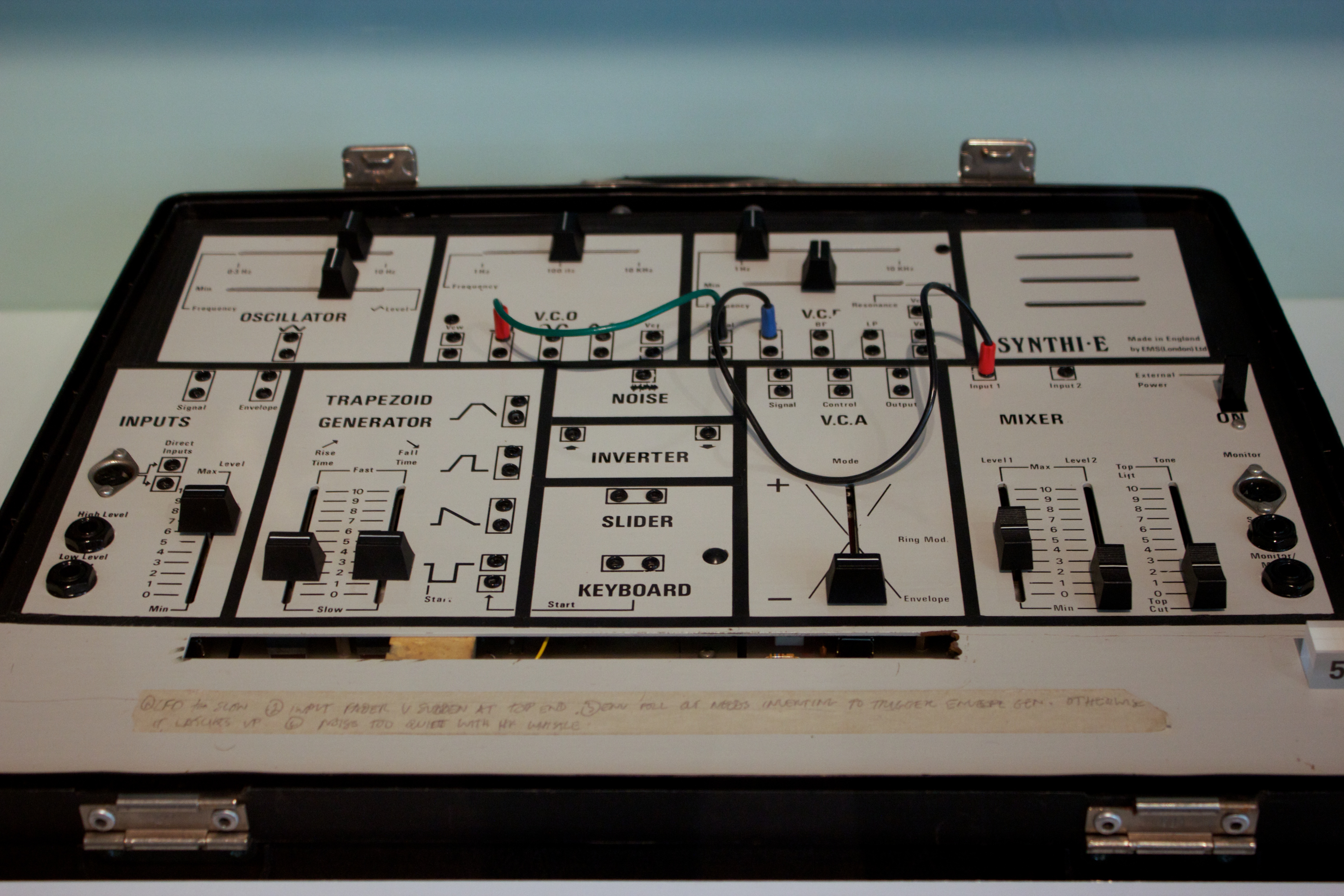
EMS Synthi-E synthesizer (1975)

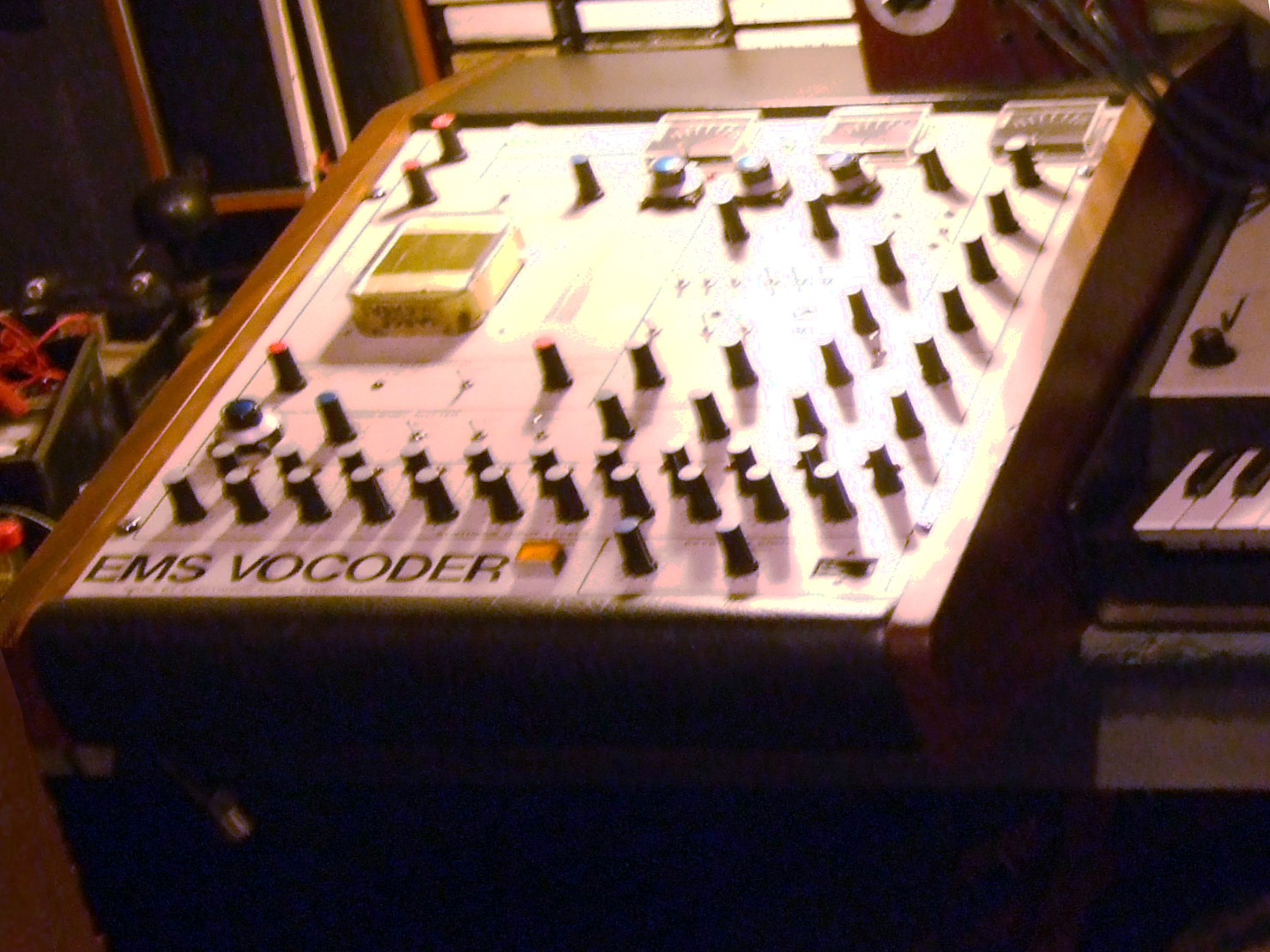
EMS Vocoder 5000 (1976)

- 1969 - EMS VCS 3
- 1971 - EMS Synthi A
- 1971 - EMS Synthi AK
- 1971 - EMS Synthi 100
- 1971 - EMS Synthi Sequencer 256 (digital sequencer)
- 1972 - EMS Synthi AKS
- 1973 - EMS Synthi Hi-Fli (multi-effect)
- 1974 - EMS Spectron (video synthesizer, formerly Spectre)
- 1975 - EMS Synthi E
- 1976 - EMS Vocoder 5000
- 1977 - EMS Vocoder 2000
- 1978 - EMS PolySynthi (polyphonic synthesizer)
