= Tristram Cary =

English-Australian composer (1925–2008)

Background information
- Born: Tristram Ogilvie Cary; 14 May 1925; Oxford, England
- Died: 24 April 2008 (aged 82) Adelaide, Australia
- Occupation: Composer
- Years active: 1943–1998

Tristram Ogilvie Cary, OAM (14 May 1925 – 24 April 2008), was a pioneering English-Australian composer. He was also active as a teacher and music critic.

== Career ==
Cary was born in Oxford, England, and educated at the Dragon School in Oxford and Westminster School in London. He was the third son and child of a pianist and the Ulster-born novelist Joyce Cary, author of Mister Johnson. While working as a radar engineer for the Royal Navy during World War II, he independently developed his own conception of electronic and tape music, and is regarded as being amongst the earliest pioneers of these musical forms.

Following World War II, he created one of the first electronic music studios, later travelling around Europe to meet the small numbers of other early pioneers of electronic music and composition. He studied arts at the University of Oxford and went on to study composition, conducting, piano, viola and horn at Trinity College London.

With Peter Zinovieff and David Cockerell, he founded Electronic Music Studios (London) Ltd, which created the first commercially available portable synthesiser, the EMS VCS 3, and was then involved in the production of such distinctive EMS products as the EMS Synthi 100.

In 1967 he created an electronic music studio at the Royal College of Music. This led to an invitation from the University of Melbourne in 1973 for a lecture tour, which in turn led to an invitation to become the Visiting Composer at the University of Adelaide in 1974. He remained there as a lecturer until 1986. He also wrote music criticism for The Australian.

== Musical works ==
His concert works of note include a Sonata for guitar (1959), Continuum for tape (1969), a cantata Peccata Mundi (1972), Contours and Densities at First Hill for orchestra (1972), a Nonet (1979), String Quartet No. 2 (1985) and The Dancing Girls for orchestra (1991).

Cary is also particularly well known for his film and television music. He wrote music for the science fiction television series Doctor Who (including the first Dalek story), as well as the score for the Ealing comedy The Ladykillers (1955). Later film scores included The Boy Who Stole a Million (1960); The Prince and The Pauper (1962); Sammy Going South (1963); Quatermass and the Pit (1967) and Blood from the Mummy's Tomb (1971), both for Hammer. He also composed the score for the ABC TV animated version of A Christmas Carol. and the children's animated special Katya and the Nutcracker.

Cary was one of the first British composers to work in musique concrète. In 1967 he created the first electronic music studio of the Royal College of Music. He built another at his home in Fressingfield, Suffolk which he transported to Australia when he emigrated there, and incorporated it into the University of Adelaide where he worked as a lecturer until 1986.

He provided the visual design for the EMS VCS3 synthesizer.

== Death ==
Cary died in Adelaide, South Australia, on 24 April 2008, aged 82.

== Honours ==
Cary won the 1977 Albert H. Maggs Composition Award. He was awarded the Medal of the Order of Australia in 1991 in recognition of service to music. He also received the 2005 lifetime achievement award from the Adelaide Critics' Circle for his contribution to music in England and Australia.

== List of works ==
=== Orchestral/Choral ===
- Peccata Mundi for Chorus, Orchestra, Speaking voice, Four tracks of tape (1972/76),
- Contours & Densities at First Hill – Fifteen Landscapes for Orchestra (1976)
- The Dancing Girls Four Mobiles for Orchestra (1991)
- Sevens Concertino for Yamaha Disklavier and Strings (1991)
- Inside Stories for chamber orchestra and prerecorded CD (1993)
- The Ladykillers Suite for Orchestra (1955/96)

=== Chamber/Solo ===
- Sonata for Guitar Alone (1959)
- Three Threes and One Make Ten Mixed decet (1961)
- Narcissus for Flute and two tape recorders (1968)
- Trios for VCS3 Synthesiser and two turntables (1971)
- Romantic Interiors for violin, cello and tape (1973)
- Family Conference for four clarinets (1981)
- Seeds Mixed Quintet (1982)
- String Quartet No.2 (1985)
- Rivers Four percussionists and two tape recorders (1986)
- Black, White & Rose Marimba and tape (1991)
- Strange Places Piano solo (1992)
- Messages Cello solo (1993)
- Through Glass Piano and electronics (1998)

=== Vocal ===
- Divertimento (1973) – for Olivetti machines, 16 singers and jazz drummer (1973) (10') Commissioned by Olivetti for the opening of a new training centre at Haslemere, England (designed by the world-famous architect James Stirling) as (a) part of a 'Venetian' concert conducted by Cary himself, and (b) the sound track of a film. Described by Cary as "friendly, undemanding music" which nevertheless he was nervous about performing, since the audience was composed of VIPs and included Yehudi Menuhin. The text of the piece consists of cardinal numbers in four languages. The performance: Premiered 21 June 1973 at Haslemere HQ of Olivetti, though the film version had already been previously recorded. Performed again in Adelaide 1974. Cary also extracted a piece from it without vocals – "Tracks from Divertimento" – in 1978. It is published on a disc – "Full Spectrum" (MOVE Records MS3027). The original Haslemere personnel were the Ambrosian Singers and Chris Karan (drums).
- Two Nativity Songs from the Piae Cantiones (arr.) (1979)
- I Am Here Soprano and Tape (1980)
- Earth Hold Songs Soprano and Piano (1993)
- Songs for Maid Marian Soprano, Piano (1959/98)

=== Electroacoustic ===
==== For analogue tape ====
- Suite – the Japanese Fishermen (1955)
- 4 5 – A Study in Limited Resources (1967)
- Birth is Life is Power is Death is God is....(1967)
- Continuum (1969)
- Suite – Leviathan '99 (1972)
- Steam Music (1978)

==== For computer ====
- Nonet (1979)
- Soft Walls (1980)
- Trellises (1984)
- The Impossible Piano (1994)

=== Films ===
- The Ladykillers, Ealing Studios (1955)
- Town on Trial, Columbia (1957)
- Time Without Pity, Harlequin (1957)
- The Flesh Is Weak (1957)
- Tread Softly Stranger (1958)
- She Didn't Say No! (1958)
- The Little Island, Richard Williams (1958) (best experimental film, Venice 1958; best experimental film, British Film Academy 1959)
- The Boy Who Stole a Million (dir. Charles Crichton) (1960)
- The Prince and The Pauper (dir. Don Chaffey) (1962)
- Sammy Going South, Michael Balcon (1963) (Royal Command Film Performance 1963)
- The Silent Playground (1963)
- Daylight Robbery (1964)
- EXPO 67 Montréal – All film soundtracks for Industrial Section, British Pavilion (1967)
- A la Mesure de l'Homme, Canadian Government (1967)
- Quatermass and the Pit, Hammer Films (1967)
- A Twist of Sand, United Artists (1968)
- Blood from the Mummy's Tomb, Hammer Films (1971)
- A Christmas Carol, ABC Films (1972) (Academy Award for Best Animated Short Film)
- The Fourth Wish, ABC (1976)
- Katya and the Nutcracker: special arrangement of Tchaikovsky's Nutcracker Ballet for a 30' children's animated film (John Cary Films / Minotaur International)

=== Radio ===
- The Japanese Fishermen (1955), possibly the first BBC radio play with electronic accompaniment
- The Children of Lir (Craig) (1959)
- La Machine Infernale (Cocteau) (1960)
- The End of Fear (Saurat) (1960)
- King Lear (Shakespeare) (1960)
- The Flight of the Wild Geese (Dillon) (1961)
- The Ballad of Peckham Rye (Spark) (1962) Italia Prize
- The Ha-Ha (Dawson) (1963)
- The Rhyme of the Flying Bomb (Peake) (1964)
- Leviathan '99 (Bradbury) (1968)

=== Television ===
- Jane Eyre (Brontë) (1963)
- No Cloak - No Dagger (1963)
- Julius Caesar (Shakespeare) (1963)
- The Daleks (Doctor Who serial) (1963) (also reused in The Rescue (1965), The Daleks' Master Plan (1966), The Ark (1966) & The Power of the Daleks (1966))
- Madame Bovary (Flaubert) (1964)
- The Ordeal of Richard Feverel (1964)
- Marco Polo (Doctor Who serial) (1964)
- Mill on the Floss (Eliot) (1964)
- The Head Waiter (Mortimer) (1966)
- The Daleks' Master Plan (Doctor Who serial) (1966) (also reused in The Power of the Daleks (1966))
- The Gunfighters (Doctor Who serial) (1966)
- The Paradise Makers (Winch) (1967)
- The Million Pound Banknote (Twain) (1968)
- Sinister Street (Mackenzie) (1969)
- The Mutants (Doctor Who serial) (1972)

=== Theatre and miscellaneous ===
- Macbeth Old Vic Theatre (1960)
- Henry IV, Pt.I Old Vic Theatre (1961)
- La Contessa (Druon, dir: Helpmann) (1965)
- Die Ballade von Peckham Rye Salzburg Festival (1965)
- Escalator Music and Centre Music EXPO 67, Montreal
- Hamlet Theatre Roundabout, (1968)
- Music for Light Olympia London (1968)
- "H" (Wood) National Theatre (1969)
- Echoes till Sunset – 3-hour open air entertainment, Adelaide Festival (1984)

=== Books ===
- Dictionary of Musical Technology (1992) (also known as the Illustrated Compendium of Musical Technology)
