= El Monstero =

Pink Floyd tribute band

El Monstero (also, 'El Monstero Y Los Masked Avengers')
- Origin: St. Louis, Missouri
- Genres: Progressive rock, blues rock, psychedelic rock, art rock
- Years active: 1999-present
- Members: Mark Thomas Quinn; Jimmy Griffin; Kevin Gagnepain; John Pessoni; Bryan Greene; Bill Reiter; Jake Elking; Dave Farver; Tandra Williams; Ermine Cannon; Kirsten Johnson
- Past members: Andy Schmidt; Brad Booker; Darren Pearce; Mindy Mierek; Coco Soul; Harmony Fernandez; Jessica Butler
- Website: elmonstero.com

El Monstero is an American, St. Louis based, Pink Floyd tribute band. Consisting of musicians from several bands, they have been recreating the music of Pink Floyd in the Midwest since 1999.

Created by members of the band Stir (Kevin Gagnepain, Brad Booker, Andy Schmidt) and singer Mark Quinn, El Monstero has become recognized as a holiday tradition with many St. Louisans, with 5 to 7 shows at The Pageant Theater selling out every Christmas season. The first El Monstero Pink Floyd tribute show was held November 27, 1999 at Mississippi Nights by the members of Stir. The band was between album cycles and decided as a way to make some extra money they'd book a cover band show, calling themselves "El Monstero Y Los Masked Avengers." Initially they played many cover songs, but focused on Pink Floyd tunes (due to mutual appreciation). From there, the concerts became an annual tradition while the band was on holiday touring breaks, growing in both band members, production, and location over the years. Recently, the band has added shows in Kansas City and Springfield, MO in January and a summer show in St. Louis in various large venues, including Jefferson Barracks Military Post in 2011, Verizon Wireless Amphitheater in 2012, 2013, 2015, 2016, 2017, 2018 and 2019 and Art Hill in Forest Park in 2014.

The band also finds time to give back to the community. In 2014, they donated all proceeds from their Sunday evening show at the Pageant to local non-profit Crisis Aid International.

One aspect of an El Monstero production is its size, sometimes utilizing upwards of 75 people to help complete the bands' vision of an authentic Pink Floyd concert. The setlist always contains selections from albums such as The Wall, The Dark Side of the Moon, Wish You Were Here and Animals, but also can include tracks such as "Free Four", "Fearless" and "Set the Controls for the Heart of the Sun".

The band is the subject of the documentary El Monstero: The Movie, directed by St. Louis native Mark Halski. Inspired by his first El Mon concert experience, Halski began production in 2013 and was in post production as of August 2015.

The 2016 band lineup is as follows:

- Mark Thomas Quinn - vocals, guitar, lap steel
- Jimmy Griffin - vocals, guitar
- Kevin Gagnepain - bass, background vocals
- John Pessoni - drums, background vocals
- Bryan Greene - guitar
- Bill Reiter - keyboards, background vocals
- Jake Elking - keyboards
- And featuring Ermine Cannon, Tandra Williams and Kirsten Johnson
- on background vocals, and Dave Farver on saxophone.
