= Free Four =

Song by Pink Floyd

- Cover of the 1972 Italy single

Single by Pink Floyd

from the album Obscured by Clouds
- B-side: "Stay"; "The Gold It's in The..."
- Released: 10 July 1972
- Recorded: February–March 1972; Strawberry Studios, France
- Genre: Folk rock
- Length: 4:15
- Label: Harvest
- Songwriter: Roger Waters
- Producer: Pink Floyd

Pink Floyd singles chronology
"One of These Days" (1971)	"Free Four" (1972)	"Money" (1973)

"Free Four" is a song by the English rock band Pink Floyd, written by Roger Waters and released on the band's 1972 album Obscured by Clouds.

== Recording and lyrics ==
The song begins with a rock and roll count-in, but in this case Pink Floyd decided to play with words and record, "One, Two, Free Four!" The song deals with reflection of one's life, the "evils" of the record industry, and also makes a reference to Roger Waters' father who was killed in World War 2. The music begins in an upbeat manner, while the lyrics tell a very cynical and somewhat depressing story. "Free Four" was released as a single in the U.S. in 1972 but did not chart. The song charted at number 29 in the Netherlands and 35 in Wallonia (Belgium).

Cashbox reviewed the single saying "Would you believe a happy song about death?" Record World said that it "is not only musically excellent but also accessible and commercial enough to hit as a single."

== Track listing ==
American release
No.	Title	Length
1.	"Free Four"	3:30
2.	"Stay"	3:58
Total length:		7:28

Italian release
No.	Title	Length
1.	"Free Four"	4:07
2.	"The Gold It's in The..."	3:01
Total length:		7:08

German release
No.	Title	Length
1.	"Free Four"	4:08
2.	"The Gold It's in The..."	3:01
Total length:		7:09

== Personnel ==
- David Gilmour – acoustic and electric guitars, handclapping
- Nick Mason – drums, tambourine, handclapping
- Roger Waters – double-tracked lead vocals, backing vocals, bass
- Richard Wright – EMS VCS 3
