= Stephen Beck =

American artist

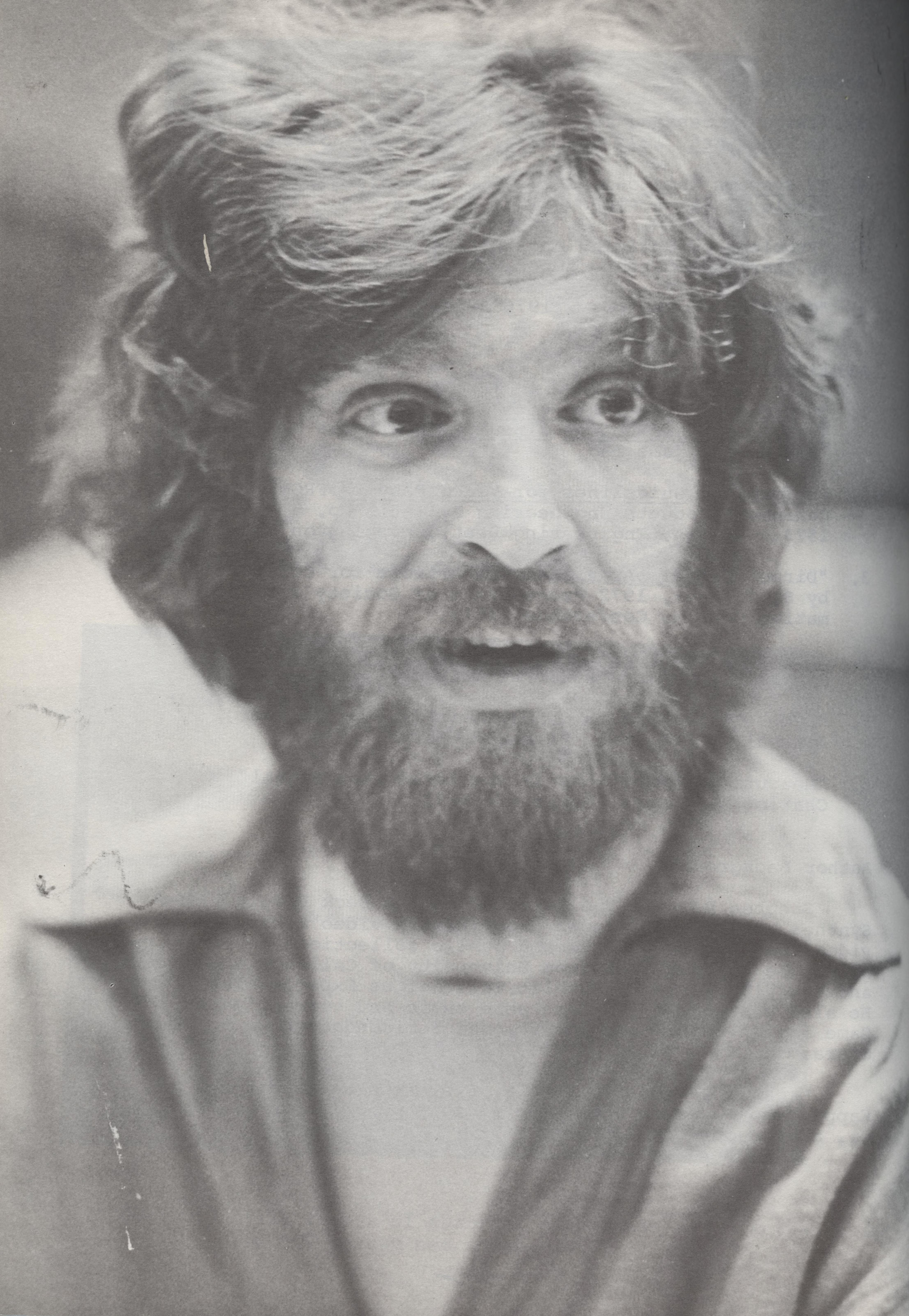
Stephen Beck in 1977.

Stephen Beck is an American artist, writer, toy designer and inventor who pioneered video synthesis and interactive video art. Examples of his work have appeared in collections including the San Francisco Museum of Modern Art, the Museum of Modern Art, New York and the Whitney Museum of American Art.

He holds several patents in phosphene based video display technology and energy management. His writings have appeared in Wired Magazine and the New York Times and he was artist in residence at KQED – NCET for the National Center for Experiments in Television.
