= Scanimate =

Analog computer animation system

Scanimate is an analog computer animation (video synthesizer) system created by Lee Harrison III of Denver, Colorado. Harrison had developed its predecessor, ANIMAC, which used a motion capture system based on a body suit with potentiometers. In contrast, Scanimate included TV technology. Scanimate's successor was called Caesar, and used a digital computer to control the analog system.

The eight Scanimate systems were used to produce much of the video-based animation seen on television between most of the 1970s and early 1980s in commercials, promotions, and show openings. One of the major advantages the Scanimate system had over film-based animation and computer animation was the ability to create animations in real time. The speed with which animation could be produced on the system because of this, as well as its range of possible effects, helped it to supersede film-based animation techniques for television graphics. By the mid-1980s, it was superseded by digital computer animation, which produced sharper images and more sophisticated 3D imagery.

Animations created on Scanimate and similar analog computer animation systems have a number of characteristic features that distinguish them from film-based animation: the motion is extremely fluid, using all 60 fields per second (in NTSC format video) or 50 fields (in PAL format video) rather than the 24 frames per second that film uses; the colors are much brighter and more saturated; and the images have a very "electronic" look that results from the direct manipulation of video signals through which the Scanimate produces the images.

== How it works ==
A special high-resolution (around 945 lines) monochrome camera records high-contrast artwork. The image is then displayed on a high-resolution screen. Unlike a normal monitor, its deflection signals are passed through a special analog computer that enables the operator to bend the image in a variety of ways. The image is then shot from the screen by either a film camera or a video camera. In the case of a video camera, this signal is then fed into a colorizer, a device that takes certain shades of grey and turns it into color as well as transparency. The idea behind this is that the output of the Scanimate itself is always monochrome. Another advantage of the colorizer is that it gives the operator the ability to continuously add layers of graphics. This makes possible the creation of very complex graphics. This is done by using two video recorders. The background is played by one recorder and then recorded by another one. This process is repeated for every layer. This requires very high-quality video recorders (such as both the Ampex VR-2000 or IVC's IVC-9000 of Scanimate's era, the IVC-9000 being used quite frequently for Scanimate composition due to its very high generational quality between re-recordings).

== Current usage ==
Two of the Scanimates are still in use at ZFx studios in Asheville, North Carolina. The original "Black Swan" R&D machine has been updated with more modern power supplies and can produce material in standard or 1080P high definition video. The "white Pearl" machine is the last one produced and is being kept in its original configuration for historical purposes by David Sieg at ZFx inc. The machines are installed in a working production environment with Grass Valley switchers, Kaleidoscope digital video effects systems, and Accom digital disk recorders for layering.

== Use in television, music and films ==
=== Music videos ===
- Let's Groove by Earth, Wind & Fire
- Get Down on It by Kool & the Gang
- Blame It on the Boogie by The Jacksons
- Knock on Wood by Amii Stewart
- Popcorn Love by New Edition

=== TV programs/movies ===
- Aerobicise (opening sequence)
- Battle of the Network Stars
- Battlestars (1981 opening sequence)
- Be Forever Yamato and Final Yamato
- Beat the Clock (1979 opening sequence)
- Bowling for Dollars (1978-1981 opening sequence)
- Braingames
- Community season 5, episode 11, "G.I. Jeff"
- David Cassidy: Man Undercover
- Demon Seed
- The Electric Company
- Face the Music ("Sandy Frank Presents" opening animation)
- Flying High
- Gatchaman II and Gatchaman Fighter
- Grammy Awards (1978)
- Krofft Supershow
- Lamb Chop's Play Along
- Lancelot Link, Secret Chimp
- Legends of the Superheroes
- The Letter People
- Logan's Run (Carousel sequence)
- Monday Night Baseball
- Monday Night Football (1973-1978 intro)
- NBC Sports
- The Next Step Beyond
- Paul's Miraculous Adventure
- The Phynx
- Post-Newsweek Stations (ID's, 1974)
- Read All About It!
- Sesame Street
- Square One Television
- Sgt. Pepper's Lonely Hearts Club Band
- Star Wars (tactical display in Death Star war room)
- Super Pay Cards! (opening logo animation)
- Tekkaman: The Space Knight (part of opening animation)
- Time Bokan (time travel sequences)
- Villa Alegre
- Willy Wonka & the Chocolate Factory (Oompa Loompa musical numbers for Augustus Gloop and Veruca Salt)
- Yattodetaman
- You and Me Kid (show's opening sequence)
- Zoom (Season 4, 1975)

=== TV channels/home video/TV productions ===
- ABC (various idents and break bumpers)
- ABS-CBN (break bumper, March 1, 1987 – October 30, 2005)
- City 2/Banahaw Broadcasting Corporation (main ID 1980–1984)
- CBC (for its "Exploding Pizza" ID, 1974–1985)
- Disney Channel (only for its launch)
- Field Communications (3D ID)
- TV Globo (for main IDs from 1976 to 1982)
- Hanna-Barbera (for its "Swirling Star" logo in 1979)
- HBO (May 1, 1975 – April 30, 1976 Feature Presentation ID; May 1, 1975 – April 30, 1976 Sign On and Sign Off ID; May 1, 1975 – September 19, 1982 Special ID)
- IBC-13/DZTV-TV ID (IDs from 1978 to 1987)
- KCOP-TV
- NBC (for their flashing marquee in their second "Let's All Be There!" promo/ident from 1985 to 1986, complimented with an Evans & Sutherland graphical mainframe)
- New York State Education Department (TV Production logo)
- RPN/CNN Philippines (1982–1986)
- RecordTV (IDs from 1979 to 1986)
- Rede Tupi
- SBT (main IDs from 1981 to 1988)
- South Carolina ETV (ID)
- Television South West (1982–1985 ID)
- Televisa (1973 ID for El Chavo for the First Season)
- TF1 (for its 1976–1985 Startup/Shutdown IDs and 1977 Le Cinéma du Dimanche Soir ID by Robert Abel and Associates)
- Televisión Nacional de Chile (for main IDs made from 1982 until 1988 and complemented with an Ampex AVA-1 machine)
- USA Network (1987 ID and other idents)
- Walt Disney Studios Home Entertainment (for 1978 Neon Mickey logo)
- WFLD (3D ID)
- WGN-TV (for The WGN 8:00 Movie opening)
- WKBD-TV (3D ID)

== See also ==
- Rutt/Etra Video Synthesizer
