= Burning Bridges (Pink Floyd song) =

Song by Pink Floyd

from the album Obscured by Clouds
- Released: 3 June 1972
- Recorded: March 1972
- Studio: Château d'Hérouville, Pontoise, France
- Genre: Progressive rock
- Length: 3:30
- Label: Harvest
- Songwriters: Richard Wright; Roger Waters
- Producer: Pink Floyd

"Burning Bridges" is a song from Pink Floyd's 1972 album Obscured by Clouds. It shares a similar tune to the instrumental "Mudmen" on the same album.

== Composition and vocals ==
It consists of an organ melody written by Richard Wright, with David Gilmour and Wright as a duet, singing the lyrics by Roger Waters.

The song is performed in 6/4.

== Live performances ==
The song was performed live by Mason in 2022, with his band Nick Mason's Saucerful of Secrets.

== Personnel ==
- David Gilmour – electric guitar, slide guitar, lead vocals
- Richard Wright – Hammond organ, lead vocals
- Roger Waters – bass guitar
- Nick Mason – drums, percussion
