= Ming Mecca =

- Developer: Jordan Bartee
- Manufacturer: Special Stage Systems
- Type: music visualizer
- Released: 2014; 12 years ago
- Introductory price: $1,350; equivalent to $1,836 in 2025

The Ming Mecca is a pixel art-oriented modular sound and interactive video synthesizer designed by Jordan Bartee, manufactured by Special Stage Systems, and released in 2014. It was followed by the Ming Micro in 2016.

== Overview ==
The Ming Mecca is a modular synthesizer designed to allow users to create, control, and manipulate retro video games. The system has 2 main modules. In the World Core users can make changes to the game world via a series of toggles and switches, and in the Control Core users can use a NES controller to give inputs directly into the game to produce various results.

These two cores allow the creation of glitch art videos, however the unit is intended to allow users to explore the game world and to use it as an "ontological toy" with sprites, backgrounds, and effects like gravity and object interaction. It is also intended to function with the Eurorack synthesizer family to allow electronic music to interact with the graphical world in realtime. In addition, a third module, the Oscillographic Block (which also interfaces with Eurorack) has provided expanded audio capacity via the Texas Instruments SN76489 chip so that it can allow chiptune, glitch music, synthesized voice, etc. when interfaced with a Eurorack.

=== Modules ===
The Ming Mecca range included the following modules:

- World Core – Manipulates the game world (video, physics, and collision) with pre-loaded graphics from an SD card
- Control Core – Utilizes an NES controller to manipulate voltage with each button command passing analog input to control, e.g., sprite behavior
- Oscillographic Block – Enables three channel digital synthesizer voice with integrated function generators, preset memory, algorithmic patch generators, and CV/gate control.

Bartee has suggested that future module expansions to the World Core may include artificial intelligence, game logic, conditional statements, and sound.

=== Ming Micro ===
Ming Micro
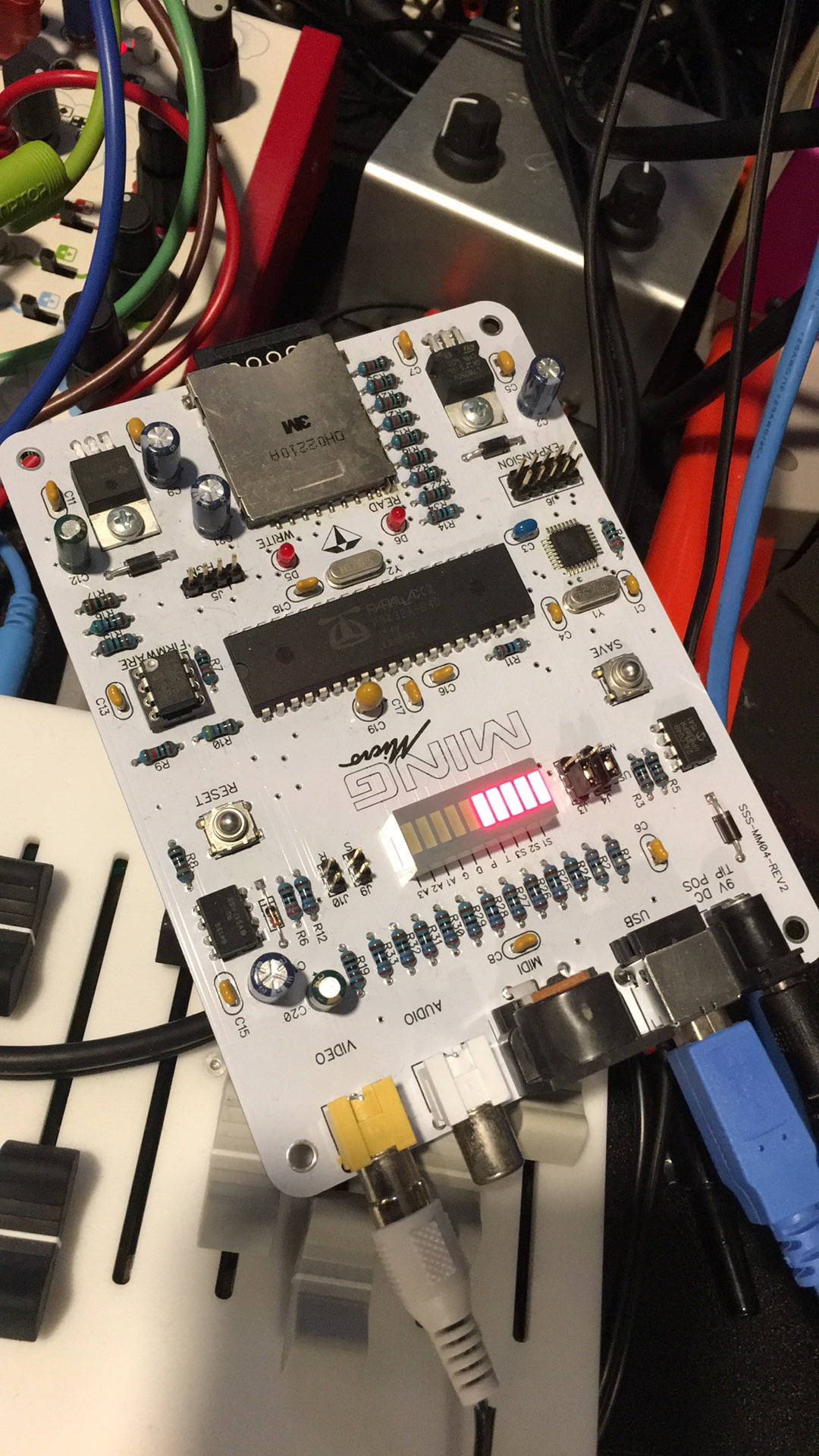
- Developer: Jordan Bartee
- Manufacturer: Special Stage Systems
- Type: music visualizer
- Released: 2016; 10 years ago
- Introductory price: $200; equivalent to $268 in 2025

In early 2016, Special Stage Systems announced that it would be releasing a portable version of the Ming Mecca called the Ming Micro. Launching a Kickstarter campaign in February 2016, the Ming Micro was fully funded in early March and manufacturing began with an estimated June delivery date.

Initially billed as a stripped down low-cost alternative to the Ming Mecca, further development of the Micro resulted in its re-conception as the second generation of the Ming series. Whereas the Mecca employs analog interface with voltage control, the Micro is designed to use USB as its means of data transfer, and a MIDI controller for manual use. The central engine is designed to showcase graphics with the four main elements including sprites, tiles, tile maps, and palettes. As previously, the Micro outputs NTSC composite video, and allows for storage via a SD card called the World Pack. In addition to the graphics engine, the Micro contains a simple audio synthesizer with two square waves and a noise generator.

To ensure the portability of the Ming Micro, parts of the Mecca's two cores have been stripped out so neither collision detection in the World Core nor NES controllers on the Control Core are available, however Bartee's intention was to increase visual aspects to appeal to VJs and chiptune musicians. Bartee has suggested that gaming controller interface may be expanded in the future via a current project called "Micro Mod".

== Development ==
The roots of the Ming Mecca emerged from Bartee's research into ontological toys as he worked on a doctoral thesis for Brown University's Department of Music. Bartee's original interests sprang from his introduction to the Commodore 64 as a child and his introduction to circuit bending as a young adult. Fascinated by the concepts of aesthetic glitches and virtual space, he developed a Commodore 64-based logic analyzer early in his college career that he called the "Trimaxion Logic Listener". His experiences with the TLL led to a series of video performances that he termed "DIGIMANCY", and set the course for his graduate studies. Seeking to connect 2D video game worlds and modular synthesizers as early as 2011, he began working on an interactive video synthesizer that he named after the "Ming Mecca" chip from Darren Aronofsky's 1998 film Pi.

Originally intended to interface with the Commodore 64, Bartee's recognition of the similarities between the TLL and the original NES Game Genie (which was better documented and whose patent had recently expired) led him to switch the Ming Mecca to a NES-oriented program. After exploring the possibility of modifying and adapting an existing NES, Bartee decided that the complexities involved in retrofitting the console would take too long and the Ming Mecca became its own console designed from scratch.

Borrowing the voltage-control (a central element of the original TLL), the NES graphics, and the modular aspects of fellow Brown student Chris Novello's "Illucia" program, the Ming Mecca was designed to interface with Eurorack synthesizers and produce visual output directly to an NTSC composite display.

== Release ==
Marketed as a retro "videogame synthesizer" at shows like Indiecade 2013 and released by Special Stage Systems (today Analogue Haven and Perfect Circuit), the Ming Mecca became available in summer of 2014 with a retail price of $1000 for the World Core and $350 for the Control Core. Bartee also simultaneously released the schematics and source code for free download from the Special Stage Systems website.

Launched via Kickstarter campaign in February 2016, the Ming Micro was funded in early March and Special Stage Systems released the unit the same year with a retail price of $200 for the assembled unit or $175 for a DIY kit.

== Reception ==
Describing the Ming Mecca as "if a Nintendo Entertainment System and a recording studio mixing board had a baby", Kotaku's review praised the ad campaigns as fully embodying the dark and intense 80s vibe, and described the unit as "the weirdest piece of new video game hardware announced this year. Or maybe any year". Similarly impressed were reviewers at AnimalNewYork where, borrowing from Special Stage Systems' blurb, they acknowledged the system as "the ultimate god mode".

Generally positive about the Ming Micro, which they referenced as "the ultimate pixel art instrument", Fact magazine did complain that the retro aspects like the composite video output requiring old CRT displays boosted "authenticity" at the expense of usability. As with Kotaku's review of the Mecca, Bartee was praised by Medium for his evocative VHS-quality videos used in his marketing campaign.

=== Fan reception and use ===
Having pledged more than three times the original Ming Micro target of $10,000 on Kickstarter, the Ming series has inspired use in chiptune and retrofuturistic visual artists. In an interview with Medium, Bartee described his excitement with various indie projects using the Ming series, and points to Darren Blondin's further development of the Mecca to turn it into a graphical sequencer as well Andrew Gibbs' adoption of the Mecca as a VJ rig for live chiptune shows.

== See also ==
- Object-oriented ontology - The theoretical underpinning of the Ming Mecca's development
- Kawasaki Synthesizer - An early Commodore 64 synthesizer
