= David Cockerell =

Electronics engineer and designer

David Cockerell is an electronics engineer and designer. He started his career in the synthesizer world when Peter Zinovieff hired him to work for his EMS company in Putney in 1966, where he designed classic EMS synthesizers such as the Synthi VCS3, Synthi AKS and Synthi 100. In 1974 he worked for Electro-Harmonix in New York, where he first designed guitar pedals like the Small Stone phaser and Electric Mistress flanger. Still working for Electro-Harmonix, in 1980, Cockerell designed one of the first digital delay pedals with looping capabilities, the Instant Replay, followed by the 2 Second Digital Delay in 1981 and the 16 Second Digital Delay in 1982. This led him later to work at Akai, where he was involved in the design of samplers like the S612, S900, S1000, and the famous MPC60.

He is currently working for Electro-Harmonix as a Chief Design Engineer.

== Career ==
=== EMS ===
Cockerell was working as a medical technician when a colleague, Mark Dowson, introduced him to Peter Zinovieff who was looking for someone with the technical skill to make the sounds he wanted to create.

The company's first commercial synthesizer, the VCS3, designed by Cockerell, was produced in 1969, followed by the Synthi KB1 in 1970, also designed by Cockerell.

=== Electro-Harmonix ===
In 1974 Cockerell went to visit some friends in New York, where he met Electro-Harmonix's founder Mike Matthews, who made Cockerell an offer to work for him as a Chief Design Engineer.

== Products designed ==
- Akai MPC60 (Electronic circuit design only)
- Akai S612
- Akai S900
- Akai S1000
- Electro-Harmonix 16 Second Digital Delay
- Electro-Harmonix 2880 Super Multi-Track Looper
- Electro-Harmonix Bad Stone Phase Shifter
- Electro-Harmonix Bass Balls - Twin Dynamic Filters for Bass Guitar
- Electro-Harmonix Bass Micro Synthesizer
- Electro-Harmonix Crying Tone
- Electro-Harmonix DRM16 Digital Rhythm Matrix model 01
- Electro-Harmonix Electric Mistress
- Electro-Harmonix HOG Guitar Synthesizer
- Electro-Harmonix Instant Replay
- Electro-Harmonix Micro Synthesizer
- Electro-Harmonix POG Polyphonic Octave Generator
- Electro-Harmonix Small Stone - Phase Shifter
- Electro-Harmonix Stereo Memory Man with Hazarai
- Electro-Harmonix Vocoder
- Electro-Harmonix XO Micro POG - Polyphonic Octave Generator
- Electro-Harmonix XO Stereo Electric Mistress
- EMS Synthi 100
- EMS Synthi A
- EMS Synthi AKS
- EMS Synthi Hi-Fli
- EMS Synthi KB1
- EMS VCS3
- EMS VCS4
