= EMS VCS 3 =

Synthesizer model

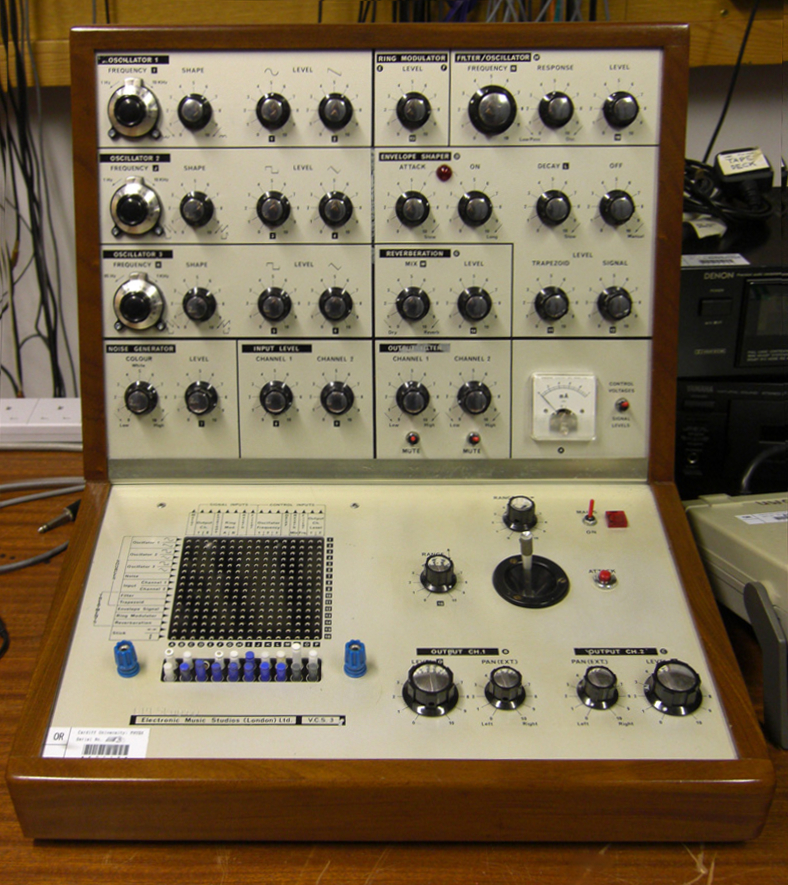
User's eye view of the "VCS 3"; top left, three main oscillators; bottom left, patch panel; bottom right, joystick. External keyboard not shown. Note: it has printed logo: "V.C.S. 3".

The VCS 3 (or VCS3; an initialism for Voltage Controlled Studio, version #3) is a portable analogue synthesizer with a flexible modular voice architecture introduced by Electronic Music Studios (EMS) in 1969.

EMS released the product under various names. Logos printed at the console's front left (see photos) say "V.C.S. 3" on the most widely sold version; "The Putney (VCS 3)" on the earlier version; and "The Synthi (VCS 3) II" on the later version "Synthi VCS 3 II".

== History ==
VCS 3 variations

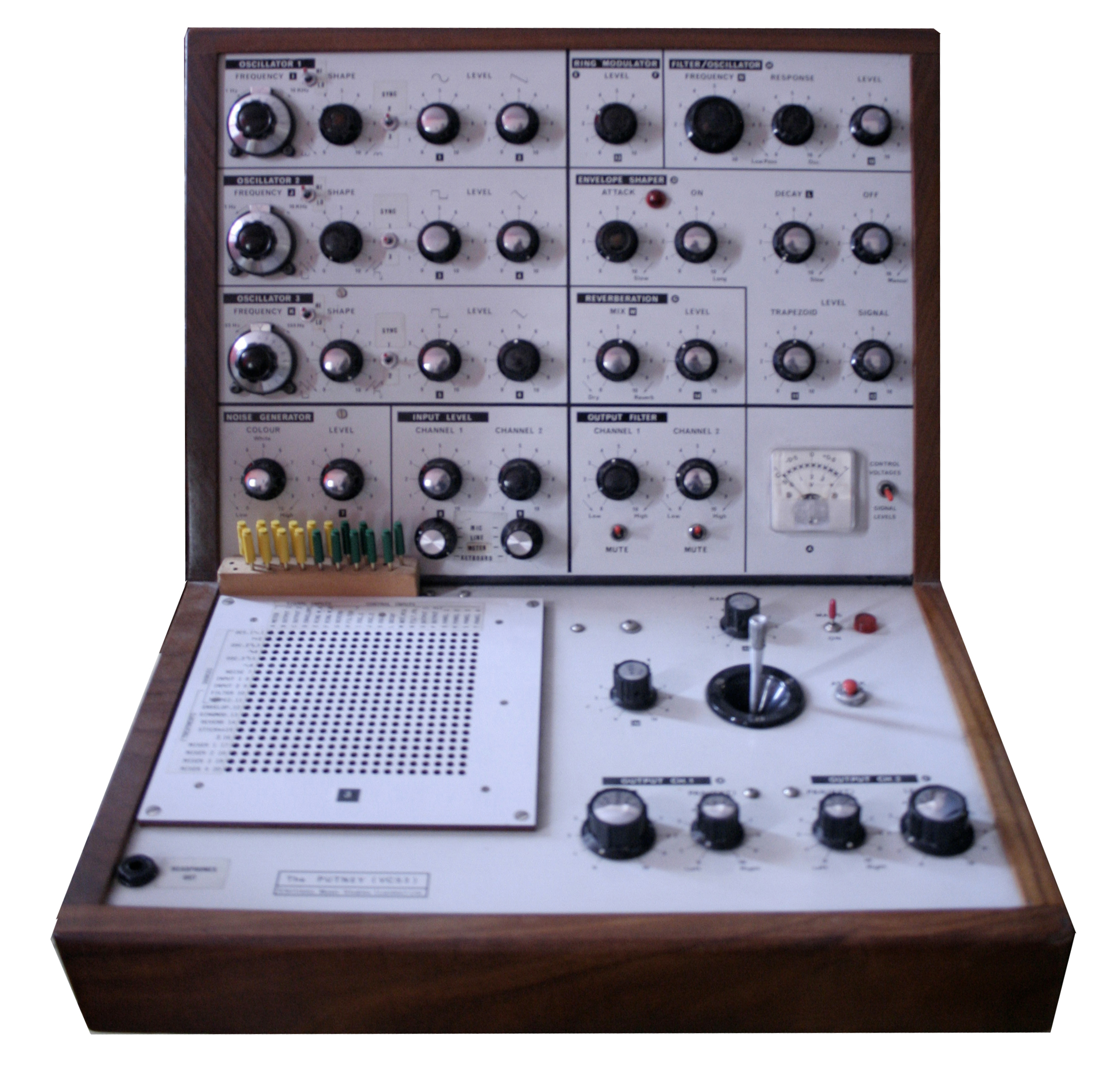
Synthi VCS 3 with logo:
"The Putney (VCS 3)"

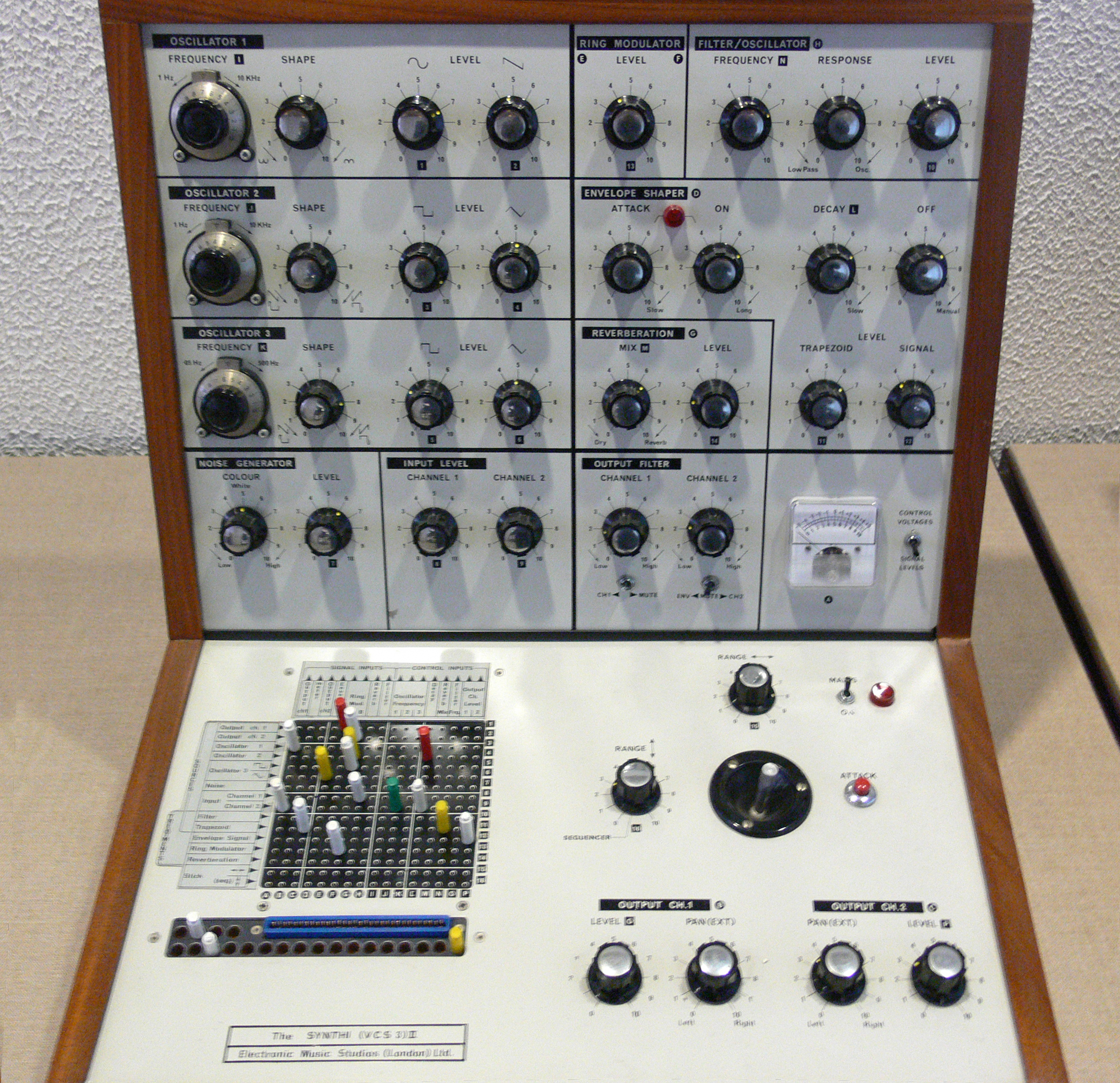
Synthi VCS 3 II with logo:
"The Synthi (VCS 3) II"

The VCS 3 was created in 1969 by Peter Zinovieff's EMS company. The electronics were designed largely by David Cockerell, and its distinctive appearance was the work of composer Tristram Cary. It was one of the first portable commercially available synthesizers, in the sense that it was housed entirely in a small wooden case, unlike synths from American manufacturers such as Moog Music, ARP and Buchla, which had large cabinets and could take up entire rooms.

The VCS 3 cost just under £330 in 1969 (equivalent to £4,800 in 2025). Some people found it unsatisfactory as a melodic instrument due to its inherent tuning instability. This arose from the instrument's reliance on the then current method of exponential conversion of voltage to oscillator frequency—an approach that other companies also implemented with fewer tuning issues. However, the VCS 3 was renowned as an extremely powerful generator of electronic effects and processor of external sounds for its cost.

The first album recorded using only the VCS 3 was The Unusual Classical Synthesizer on Westminster Gold.

The VCS 3 was popular among progressive rock bands, and was used on recordings by artists including Franco Battiato, The Moody Blues, The Alan Parsons Project, Jean-Michel Jarre, Todd Rundgren, Hawkwind, Curved Air, Brian Eno (with Roxy Music and as a solo artist or collaborator), King Crimson, The Who, Gong, and Pink Floyd. Two VCS 3s and a Sequencer 256 were featured in the 1978 film The Shout.

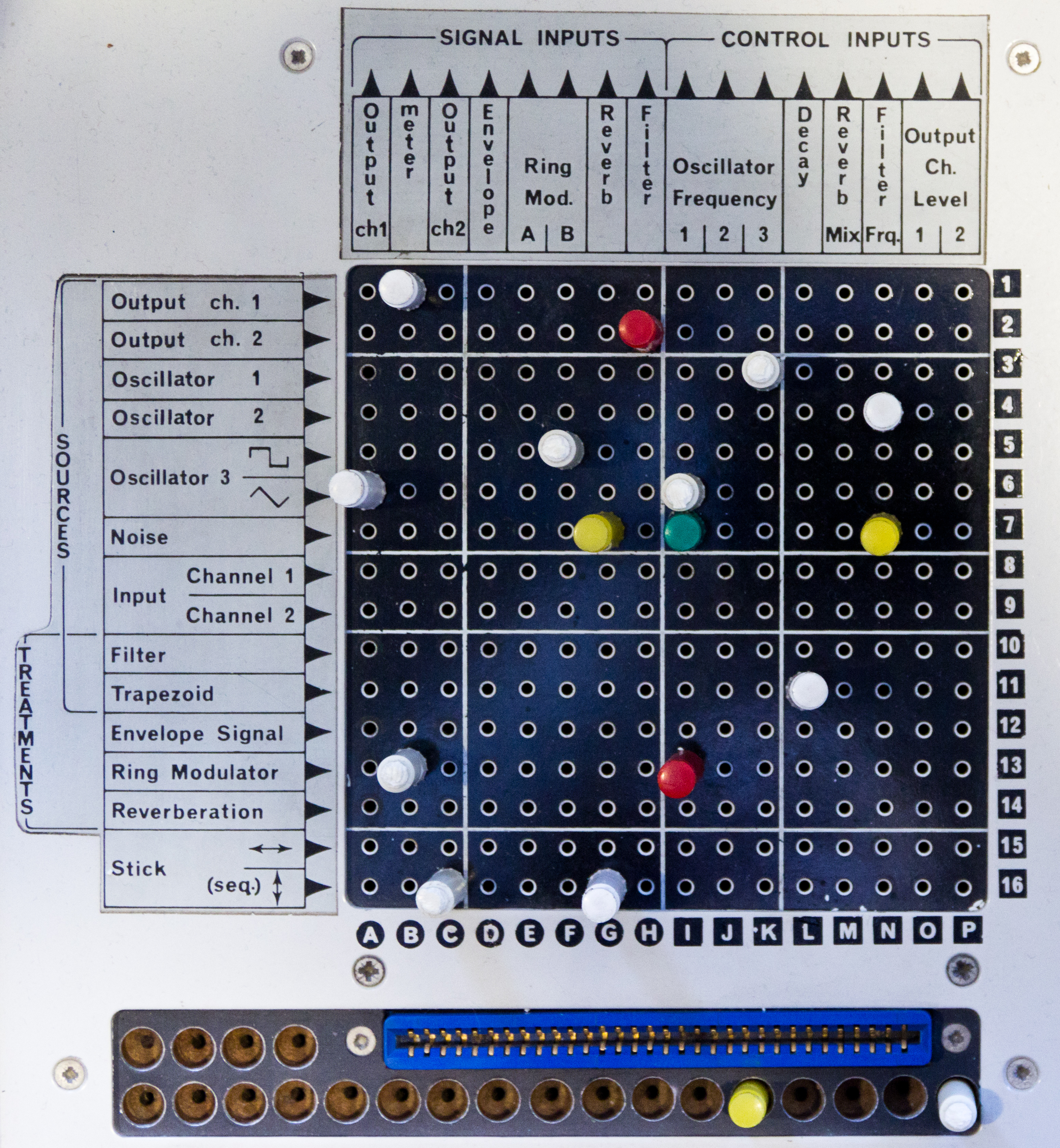
The routing matrix on the VCS 3

== Description ==
The VCS 3 has three oscillators (the first two normal voltage-controlled oscillators; the third a low-frequency oscillator), a noise generator, two input amplifiers, a ring modulator, 24 dB/octave low-pass voltage-controlled filter, a trapezoid envelope generator, a joystick controller, a voltage-controlled spring reverb unit, and two voltage controlled output amplifiers. Unlike most modular synthesiser systems, which used cables to link components, the VCS 3 uses a distinctive patchboard matrix where pins are inserted to connect its components.

=== Keyboards controller ===
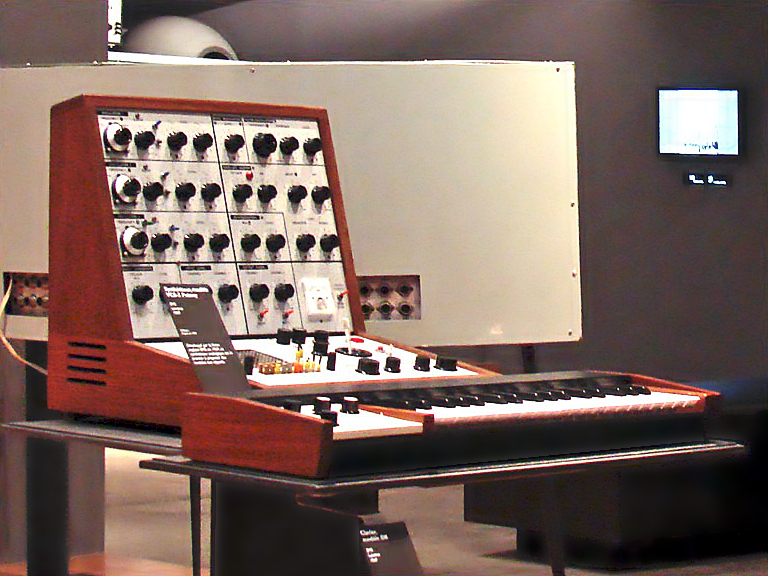
DK1 keyboard controller (front) connected to VCS 3 (rear)

Because it lacks a built-in keyboard, the VCS 3 is often used for generating sound effects. External keyboard controllers are, however, available for melodic play. The DK1, produced in 1969, is an early velocity-sensitive monophonic keyboard for VCS 3 with an extra VCO and VCA. In 1972 it was extended for duophonic play as DK2. The Synthi AKS was released the same year, as well as a digital sequencer with a touch-sensitive flat keyboard, the KS sequencer, and its mechanical keyboard version, DKS.

=== Related models ===
The VCS 3's basic design was reused by EMS in many other of their own products, most notably the EMS Synthi 100 (1971), the Synthi A (1971), and AKS (1972, essentially a VCS 3 in a plastic briefcase). The AKS also has a sequencer built into the keyboard's lid.

A former agent of EMS in the United States, Ionic Industries, released a portable-keyboard VCS 3 clone in 1973. The Ionic Performer, whose circuitry is based on the VCS 3's, replaced the patchboard matrix with over 100 push-buttons, and added a built-in keyboard and effects units.

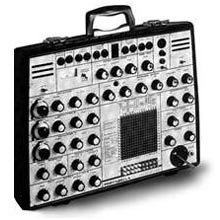
EMS Synthi A (1971),
also called Portabella

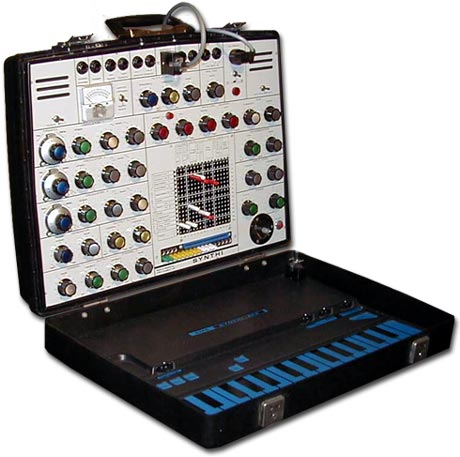
EMS Synthi AKS (1972)

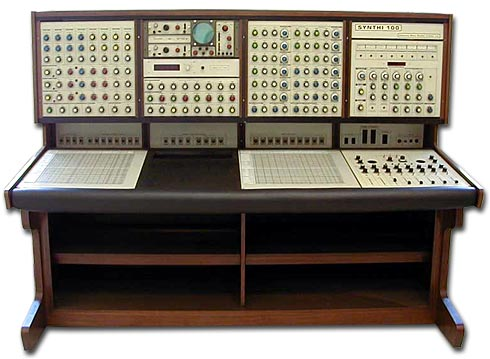
EMS Synthi 100 (1971),
formerly Digitana, also called The Delaware

==== Synthi A ====
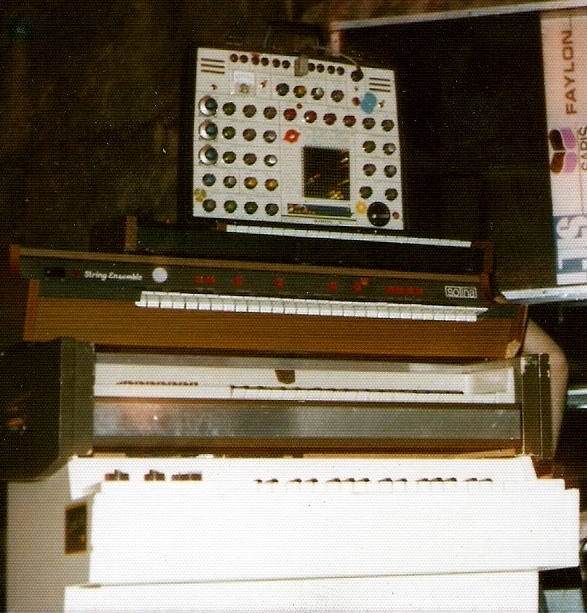
EMS SynthiA (top) as used on stage by a progressive rock band; underneath are an EMS DK keyboard controller, Solina String Ensemble, Optigan, and an M400 Mellotron

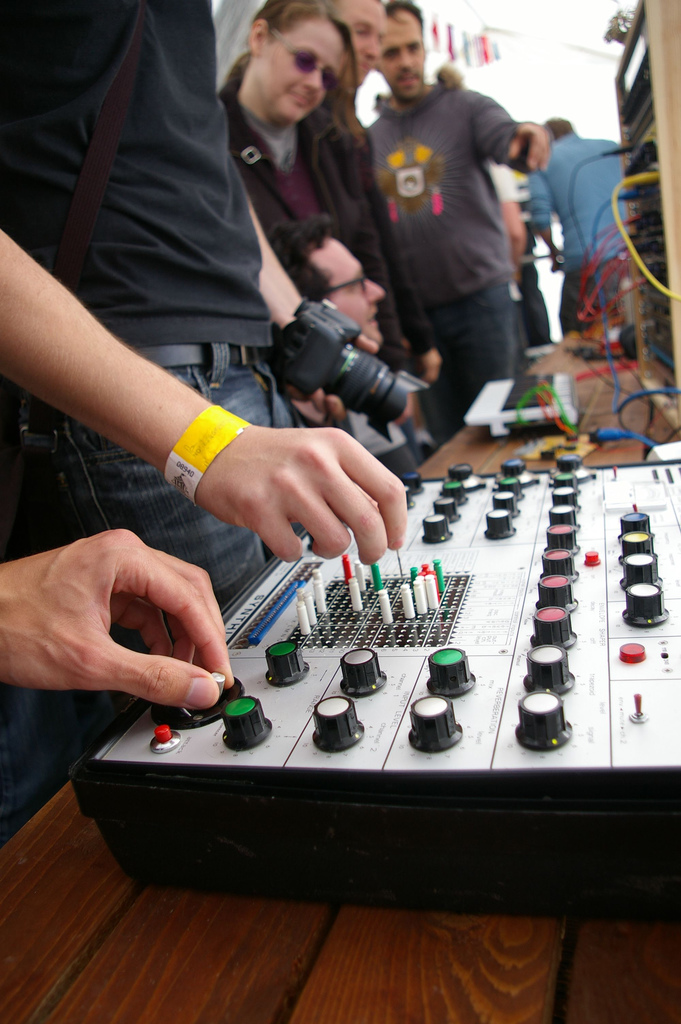
EMS Synthi A

The EMS Synthi A has the same electronics as the VCS 3, but was rehoused in a Spartanite briefcase. Instead of routing signals using patch cables, like Moog products, it uses a patch matrix with resistive pins. The 2700 ohm resistors soldered inside each pin vary in tolerance, indicated by different colours: red pins have 1% tolerance, white have 5%, and green pins are attenuating pins with a resistance of 68,000 ohms.

The later Synthi AKS incorporated an early digital 256 event KS (Keyboard Sequencer) sequencer in the lid, with input provided by a capacitance-sensitive Buchla-style keyboard.

Perhaps its most prominent use is in the introduction to The Alan Parsons Project's I Robot. (1977). VCS 3 synthesisers were also used alongside a traditional chamber music ensemble for the soundtrack to the BBC's Life On Earth nature documentary series, composed by Edward Williams.

Along with Klaus Schulze and Tangerine Dream, other frequent users of the instrument include Cabaret Voltaire, Tim Blake & Miquette Giraudy of Gong, Richard Pinhas of Heldon, Merzbow, Thomas Lehn, Cor Fuhler and Alva Noto.

== Development ==
The original VCS No.1 was a hand-built rack-mount unit with two oscillators, one filter and one envelope, designed by Cockerell before the formation of EMS. When a benefactor, Don Banks, asked Zinovieff for a synthesiser, Zinovieff and Cockerell decided to work together on an instrument that was small and portable but powerful and flexible.

== Notable users ==
- BBC Radiophonic Workshop
- Brian Eno
- Howie B on U2's Pop
- Jean-Michel Jarre
- Merzbow on Door Open at 8 AM
- Pete Townshend
- Pink Floyd on Obscured by Clouds (1972), The Dark Side of the Moon (1973), and Wish You Were Here (1975)
- King Crimson on Lizard (1970) and Earthbound (1972)
- Todd Rundgren
- Tangerine Dream

== Bibliography ==
- Hinton, Graham (December 2002). "EMS: The Inside Story". Electronic Music Studios (Cornwall). Archived from the original on 2013-05-21.
- Hinton, Graham (December 2002). "A Guide to the EMS Product Range - 1969 to 1979". Electronic Music Studios (Cornwall). Archived from the original on 2013-10-31.
- Reid, Gordon (November 2000). "All About EMS, Part 1". Sound on Sound. Archived from the original on 2016-03-03.
- Reid, Gordon (December 2000). "All About EMS, Part 2". Sound on Sound. Archived from the original on 2011-09-08.

Models
