= Obscured by Clouds =

1972 soundtrack album by the English rock band Pink Floyd

Studio album / soundtrack album by Pink Floyd
- Released: 2 June 1972
- Recorded: 23 February – 6 April 1972
- Studio: Château d'Hérouville, Hérouville, France
- Genres: Progressive rock; folk rock
- Length: 40:08
- Label: Harvest
- Producer: Pink Floyd

Pink Floyd chronology
Meddle (1971)	Obscured by Clouds (1972)	The Dark Side of the Moon (1973)

Singles from Obscured by Clouds
- 1. "Free Four" Released: 10 July 1972 (US)

Obscured by Clouds is the seventh studio album, and second soundtrack album, by the English progressive rock band Pink Floyd, released on 2 June 1972 by Harvest and Capitol Records. It serves as the soundtrack for the French film La Vallée, by Barbet Schroeder. It was recorded in two sessions in France, while Pink Floyd were in the midst of touring, and produced by the band.

The album's only single was "Free Four". Obscured by Clouds has been seen as a stopgap for the band, who had started work on their next album, The Dark Side of the Moon (1973). The album reached number six in the United Kingdom and number 46 in the United States; retrospective opinions from both fans and critics have been mixed, some critics noting the similarities to their later material.

== Background ==
By 1972, Pink Floyd had recorded the soundtracks to the films The Committee (1968) and More (1969), and part of Zabriskie Point (1970). On the back of More's success, its director, Barbet Schroeder, asked them to record the soundtrack to his next major project. The new film, La Vallée, would be about two travellers on a spiritual quest in New Guinea, and Schroeder thought Pink Floyd would be suitable to provide the music. The group had already started working on another album, The Dark Side of the Moon, including some basic recording and live performances, but took two breaks to Strawberry Studios, Château d'Hérouville, France, just before and after doing a Japanese tour, to write and record music for the film. The album was mixed from 4–6 April at Morgan Sound Studios in London.

As they had done on More, the band saw a rough cut of the film and noted certain timings for cues with a stopwatch. From this, they created a number of pieces that they felt could be cross-faded at various points in the final cut of the film. They were not worried about creating complete songs, feeling that any musical piece would be workable without the need for any solos, but nevertheless, under pressure to produce enough material, they managed to create a series of well-structured songs. Drummer Nick Mason recalls that the sessions were very hurried, and the band spent most of the time in Paris locked away in the studio.

During the first recording session in February 1972, the French television station ORTF filmed a short segment of the band recording the album, including interviews with bassist Roger Waters and guitarist David Gilmour. In a snippet of interview footage at Abbey Road Studios that appeared in the 1974 theatrical version (later released on VHS and Laserdisc and subsequent "Director's Cut" DVD) of Pink Floyd: Live at Pompeii, Waters said that early UK pressings of the album contained excessive sibilance.

After recording had finished, the band fell out with the film company, prompting them to release the soundtrack album as Obscured by Clouds, rather than La Vallée. In response, the film was retitled La Vallée (Obscured by Clouds) on its release.

== Songs ==
The songs on Obscured by Clouds are all short and economical, in contrast to the lengthy instrumentals found on other Floyd albums. A strong country music influence is present on several tracks, with prominent use of acoustic guitar. The album also features the VCS 3 synthesiser, which Wright had purchased from the BBC Radiophonic Workshop.

The title track uses the VCS 3 and Mason playing electronic drums. It was written by David Gilmour and Roger Waters. The following track, "When You're In", is similar in style, with Gilmour coming up with the main riff and the rest of the band jamming on it. Its title came from a phrase said by roadie Chris Adamson. The two pieces were played back-to-back live in late 1972 and on the 1973 tours. They were also part of the set used for the group's collaboration with Roland Petit and the Ballet National de Marseille at the Palais de Sports, Paris, in early 1973.

"Burning Bridges" is one of two songwriting collaborations on the album between keyboardist Richard Wright (who wrote the music) and Waters (who wrote the lyrics). "The Gold It's In The ... " is a straightforward rock song; Gilmour, who composed the music, may have played bass on the track instead of Waters (who wrote the lyrics), as well as multiple electric guitar parts. "Wot's... Uh the Deal?" is a straightforward acoustic piece with music by Gilmour and lyrics by Waters. It was never performed live by Pink Floyd, but Gilmour resurrected the piece for his solo tour in 2006. One of these performances features on Gilmour's 2007 DVD Remember That Night and the vinyl version of his 2008 live album, Live in Gdańsk. "Mudmen" is an instrumental adaptation of "Burning Bridges" in a different time signature composed by Wright and Gilmour.

"Childhood's End" was the last song Pink Floyd released to have lyrics written by Gilmour (who also wrote the music) until the release of A Momentary Lapse of Reason in 1987. The title may have been derived from the Arthur C. Clarke novel of the same name. It was performed live at a few gigs in late 1972 and early the following year; the drum pattern opening the track was recycled for "Time" on The Dark Side of the Moon.

"Free Four" was the first Pink Floyd song since "See Emily Play" to attract significant airplay in the US, and the second (after "Corporal Clegg" from A Saucerful of Secrets) to refer to the death of Waters' father during World War II. The title is derived from the count-in "One, two, 'free, four!", spoken in a Cockney accent. Waters played rhythm acoustic guitar during the recording, as well as bass, and its the only song to be entirely written by him on the album. The track was released as a single in the US, as the band felt it was suitable for AM radio.

"Stay" was written and sung by Wright, with lyrics by Waters. It is superficially a love song, except the protagonist cannot remember the girl's name, suggesting that she might have been a groupie. "Absolutely Curtains", the closing instrumental on the album, even if credited to the whole band, is primarily based around Wright's keyboards (who actually composed the track). It ends with a recording of the Mapuga tribe chanting, as seen in the film.

== Cover ==
The album's cover was, like several other Pink Floyd albums, designed by Storm Thorgerson and Aubrey Powell of Hipgnosis. The cover is a still from a workprint of La Vallée depicting a man (Jean-Pierre Kalfon as Gaëtan) sitting in a tree, reaching out to pick the fruit from one of its branches. The still is out of focus to the point of complete distortion. Hipgnosis viewed a number of stills from the film on a 35mm projector and liked the visual effect when the slide jammed. Schroeder later said the band did not want to make the cover particularly good as The Dark Side of the Moon would have to compete with it, but Thorgerson insisted it be given proper consideration like any other Floyd album.

== Release and reception ==
Professional ratings
Review scores
Source	Rating
AllMusic	3/5 stars
Christgau's Record Guide	C
The Daily Telegraph	3/5 stars
Encyclopedia of Popular Music	3/5 stars
Paste	7.0/10
The Rolling Stone Album Guide	2/5 stars
Tom Hull	B−

Obscured by Clouds was released in the UK on 2 June 1972 and then in the United States on 15 June 1972, both on Harvest. The album reached number one in France, number six on the UK Albums Chart, and number 46 on the US albums chart (where it was certified Gold by the RIAA in 1997). In 1986, the album was released on CD. A digitally remastered CD was released in March 1996 in the UK and August 1996 in the US. It was remixed in 2016 for the Early Years box set, and released individually the following year.

In a contemporary review, the Lincolnshire Echo expressed the opinion that, while not a major work, Obscured by Clouds was an interesting, diverse album with "flashes of Floyd's talent for producing exciting space music." Ray Miller wrote in the Evening Argus that it showcases Pink Floyd at "a medium stage of their development" rather than the farthest reaches of their sound, but hailed it for capturing "the imitable sound of probably the best British progressive group of them all." Southern Daily Echo critic Barry Dillon considered the album superior to prior Pink Floyd "masterpieces", describing the music as "stormy, moodily majestic and adventurously melodic. In short, the British pioneers of space age sounds present another work of art."

Even among fans, it is not one of Pink Floyd's more popular albums, though Mason has said it is one of his favourite Floyd albums. Retrospective critical reception has been mixed; The Daily Telegraph said "its elegant instrumentals point the way to Dark Side", while Rolling Stone said it was a "dull film soundtrack". Music critic Jim DeRogatis named the album as "the only sub-par offering" of the film soundtracks produced by the band. Ultimate Classic Rock's Ryan Reed says it "remains one of Pink Floyd's strangest and least popular albums, despite its many arresting songs and glorious sonic excavations."

== Track listing ==
All lyrics are written by Roger Waters, except "Childhood's End", written by David Gilmour.

Side one
No.	Title	Music	Lead vocals	Length
1.	"Obscured by Clouds"	Gilmour, Waters	Instrumental	3:03
2.	"When You're In"	Gilmour, Waters, Wright, Mason	Instrumental	2:18
3.	"Burning Bridges"	Wright	Gilmour, Wright	3:29
4.	"The Gold It's in the..."	Gilmour	Gilmour	3:07
5.	"Wot's... Uh the Deal?"	Gilmour	Gilmour	5:08
6.	"Mudmen"	Wright, Gilmour	Instrumental	4:20
Total length:				21:25

Side two
No.	Title	Music	Lead vocals	Length
7.	"Childhood's End"	Gilmour	Gilmour	4:31
8.	"Free Four"	Waters	Waters	4:15
9.	"Stay"	Wright	Wright	4:05
10.	"Absolutely Curtains"	Wright*, Gilmour, Waters, Mason	Instrumental	5:52
Total length:				18:43

== Personnel ==
All personnel are uncredited on the original sleeve.

Pink Floyd

- David Gilmour – acoustic, electric and pedal steel guitars, VCS 3 synthesiser, bass guitar, vocals
- Nick Mason – drums, percussion
- Roger Waters – bass guitar, acoustic guitar, vocals
- Richard Wright – Hammond organ (2, 3, 5–7, 10), piano (5, 6, 9, 10), Farfisa organ (10), VCS 3 synthesiser, electric piano, vocals

Additional personnel

- Hipgnosis – album cover
- Mapuga tribe – chant on "Absolutely Curtains"

== Charts ==
Chart performance for Obscured by Clouds
Chart (1972)	Peak position
Australian Albums (Kent Music Report)	44
Canada Top Albums/CDs (RPM)	32
Danish Albums (Tracklisten)	3
Dutch Albums (Album Top 100)	3
German Albums (Offizielle Top 100)	19
Italian Albums (Musica e Dischi)	5
UK Albums (Official Charts)	6
US Billboard 200	46

== Certifications and sales ==
Certifications and sales for Obscured by Clouds
Region	Certification	Certified units/sales
Germany (BVMI)	Gold	250,000^{^}
United Kingdom (BPI)	Gold	100,000^{‡}
United States (RIAA)	Gold	500,000^{^}
^{^} Shipments figures based on certification alone.^{‡} Sales+streaming figures based on certification alone.
