= Lee Harrison III =

Lee Harrison III (1929–1998) was a pioneer in analog electronic animation. Harrison received two bachelor's degrees from Washington University in St. Louis (Bachelor of Fine Arts in 1952 and a Bachelor of Science in Mechanical Engineering in 1959). He is best known as the inventor of Scanimate and the ANIMAC. He received an Emmy Award in 1972 for his work.

== Early life ==
Harrison was raised in Belleville, Illinois where his family were influential business leaders. He is the grandson of Lee Harrison who invented the "Jumbo" Steam Engine. His brother Theopolis Harrison became the President of Harrison Machine Works.

Between degrees at Washington University, he served two years in the Coast Guard and worked as an artist.

== Career ==
He was the founder, president, chairman, and chief executive officer of the former Computer Image Corporation in Denver. He won an Emmy Award in 1972.
