= 4D =

4D or 4-D primarily refers to:

- Four-dimensional space
- 4-dimensional spacetime: three-dimensional space of length, width, and height, plus time

It may also refer to:

== Computers and photography ==
- 4D (software), a complete programming environment including database and web server
  - 4D SAS, developers of 4D and Wakanda
  - 4D Inc, a US-based subsidiary of 4D SAS
- 4D BIM, a term used in computer aided design
- 4D printing
- Cinema 4D, a commercial cross platform 3D graphics application
- SGI IRIS 4D, a line of workstations from Silicon Graphics
- 4D, a photo print size for digital cameras

== Arts and entertainment ==
- 4D (album), a 2010 album by Matthew Shipp
- "4-D" (The X-Files), an episode of The X-Files
- 4D Audio Recording system, an audio recording system developed by Deutsche Grammophon
- 4D film, a high technology film experience augmented with physical or environmental effects
- 4DTV, a satellite TV broadcasting technology from Motorola
- 4DX, a 4D film format
- "4D", a song by Grand Mixer DXT and Bill Laswell from Aftermathematics (2003)
- "4D", a song by Northlane from Alien (2019)
- 4D, the production code for the 1975 Doctor Who serial Revenge of the Cybermen

== Other ==
- Class 4-D, a classification of the Selective Service System
- 4-D (psychedelic), a psychedelic drug
- 4D (train) in Melbourne, Australia
- 4-Digits, a lottery in Malaysia and Singapore
- Air Sinai (IATA: 4D)
- Ring finger, the fourth digit (abbreviated 4D) of the hand
- Potez 4D, a four-cylinder aircraft engine

== See also ==
- D4 (disambiguation)
- DDDD (disambiguation)
- Fourth dimension (disambiguation)
- Four Dimensions (disambiguation)
