= D4 =

D4, D.IV, d4 or variants may refer to:

== Science and medicine ==
- 22-Dihydroergocalciferol, vitamin D_{4}
- D4-isoprostane, a type of isoprostane
- ATC code D04, Antipruritics, including antihistamines, anesthetics, etc., a subgroup of the Anatomical Therapeutic Chemical Classification System
- D04, Carcinoma in situ of skin ICD-10 code
- Dopamine receptor D4, a human gene
- Octamethylcyclotetrasiloxane, called D_{4}

== Mathematics ==
- Dihedral group of order 4, otherwise known as the Klein four-group
- Dihedral group of order 8, the symmetry group of a regular 4-gon
- D_{4} (root system)

== Technology and computing ==
- D4 (programming language), a programming language of the Dataphor system
- D4 video connector, a type of analog video connector found on Japanese consumer electronics
- D4 framing standard, a framing standard for traditional time-division multiplexing

== Aircraft ==
- Albatros D.IV, a World War I experimental German fighter aircraft
- Auster D.4, a 1960 two-seat British light aircraft
- Dewoitine D.4, a Dewoitine aircraft
- Dunne D.4, a 1907 British experimental aircraft
- Fokker D.IV, a World War I German fighter biplane
- Phönix D.IV, a KuKLFT D-class designation aircraft
- Schütte-Lanz D.IV, a 1917 German fighter prototype aircraft
- Siemens-Schuckert D.IV, a 1918 German fighter aircraft

== Transport ==
=== Rail ===
- Bavarian D IV, an 1878 German tank locomotive model
- Bavarian D IV (Ostbahn), an 1867 German steam locomotive model
- D4, the tank engine variant of the Victorian Railways Dd class locomotive in Australia
- GSWRI Class D4, a Great Southern and Western Railway Irish steam locomotive
- LNER Class D4, a class of British steam locomotives
- PRR D4, an 1873 American steam locomotive model
- SP&S Class D-4, a Spokane, Portland and Seattle Railway locomotive

=== Road ===
- D4 motorway (Czech Republic), a motorway in the Czech Republic
- D4 motorway (Slovakia), a motorway in Slovakia

== Engines ==
- Mercedes D.IV, a World War I German 8-cylinder, liquid-cooled inline aircraft engine
- Mercedes D.IVa, a 1917 German 6-cylinder, water-cooled, inline aircraft engine

== Media and entertainment ==
- The D4, a rock band from Auckland, New Zealand
- D4 Princess, a 1999 Japanese manga series
- D4: Dark Dreams Don't Die, a video game by Hidetaka Suehiro for the Xbox One and PC
- D4 (film), by Darrin Dickerson
- D4 - Get Up and Dance, an Indian dance fiction television series
- Diablo IV, an action role-playing game by Blizzard Entertainment
- Dillinger Four, a punk rock band from Minneapolis, Minnesota

== Other uses ==
- Nikon D4, a flagship DSLR from Nikon
- Caterpillar D4 a small crawler type tractor built by Caterpillar Inc.
- HMAS Voyager (D04), a 1949 Australian Navy destroyer
- HMS D4, a 1911 British submarine
- Peugeot D4, a French van sold between 1955 and 1965
- Dublin 4, a Dublin postcode
- d4, a 4-sided die
- d4, the second most popular opening move in chess; begins the Queen's Pawn Game
- D4, IATA code for Alidaunia airline
- D4, commonly used jargon by fans for Ddu-Du Ddu-Du, a song by K-Pop group Blackpink.

== See also ==
- 4D (disambiguation)
- DDDD (disambiguation)
- Div (disambiguation)
