= Order of the Sinking Star =

2026 video game

- Developers: Thekla, Inc.
- Publisher: Arc Games
- Director: Jonathan Blow
- Composers: Peter Due; Martin Stig Andersen
- Platforms: Windows; Nintendo Switch 2; PlayStation 5
- Release: October 8, 2026
- Genre: Puzzle
- Mode: Single-player

Order of the Sinking Star is a puzzle video game developed by Thekla, Inc. and published by Arc Games. It is the third game directed by Jonathan Blow after Braid (2008) and The Witness (2016). It was developed using Jai, a programming language developed in-house by Blow and his studio. The game is based on several Sokoban-style browser games, with several developers of these earlier games and similar titles brought on for level development. While the game initially starts across four realms with singular mechanics based on four key games, the game later leads to combination of these mechanics to create more complex puzzles.

The game was released for Nintendo Switch 2, PlayStation 5, and Windows in October 2026. It received positive reviews from critics.

== Gameplay ==
Order of the Sinking Star plays on an overworld, with the player-character moving across a grid-based map that is split into four different realms. Many locations in the overworld lead to individual puzzle levels, which on completion can open up access to further areas of the overworld, or provide instructions on mechanics to unlock area on the overworld map. A fast travel system allows the player to move to within or a separate realm once they reach specially-marked spots. Narrative elements of the game are advanced as the player completes puzzles and travels farther through the world.

Each of the four realms have puzzles inspired by mechanics from earlier Sokoban-like games:

- "The Hearty Heroes of Hauling", based on Heroes of Sokoban by Jonah Ostroff, has the player control one or more heroes that have different abilities involving the pushing or pulling of rocks or other obstacles, with the goal to bring all heroes to target spots on the level to complete it.
- "The Mirror Isles", based on Mirror Islands by Alan Hazelden, where the character uses mirrors to cross over gaps between islands or create clones to reach target spaces.
- "Skipping Stones to Lonely Homes", based on the game of the same name by Alan Hazelden, where the player uses stones to create gaps or divert flows of water on islands as to reach a target location.
- "Vault of the Beamcasters", based on Promesst by Sean Barrett, where the player collects gems to activate beams that grant different abilities to allow them to pass through the level to a different location.

Nearly all mechanics are based on simple movement or interaction. Within a puzzle, players can reset the puzzle state if they get stuck, or use a rewind feature to undo all previous steps, allowing for experimentation without penalization.

After completing enough puzzles from various realms, the player gains access to puzzles that combine two or more of these mechanics, creating a second level to the game. For example, combinations of "Hearty Heroes" and "Mirror Isles" puzzles can require the player to manipulate mirrored clones of the heroes. Lead developer Johnathan Blow stated there was also a third level of puzzles which he did not reveal prior to release. Early puzzles in the game work on a 2D plane, but later puzzles are 3D.

Blow said that the game has more than 1400 puzzles, and that the game can take up to 250 hours to complete at a normal pace, and more than 500 hours to solve all puzzles. However, the player need not complete all puzzles to reach the end of the game's story.

== Development ==
When announced, Order of the Sinking Star had been in development for nearly 10 years. Blow had anticipated that the development would be shorter than the seven years needed for The Witness, but by the fifth year, realized he was only about halfway done. With his development studio Thekla running out of funds, Blow was able to achieve publishing support from Arc Games, which gave him the additional funds to make sure the game met the vision he wanted.

A portion of lengthy development was the creation of a new programming language, Jai, and a custom game engine for the game Part of the motivation to create Jai was that by the end of development on The Witness, written in C++, director Jonathan Blow didn't like the language anymore, noting "I felt very sad that I had to go into the office every day and program on C++." He said that the studio can now program faster with Jai than with C++, which should enable Thekla to ship their next game sooner. Order originated as a development test with Jai.

In developing the basis of Order, Blow had seen a number of puzzle games, several based on the open-source PuzzleScript engine. He considered how he had created The Witness to be based on learning meanings of individual symbols before combining those into larger puzzles, and conceived of a similar approach using full puzzle mechanics from these PuzzleScript and other games. The choice of which game mechanics to include was aided that most had a Sokoban-style, underlying grid structure, and so could all fit together when combined. Unlike Thekla's previous games where most of the puzzles were designed by Blow, level designers included Hazelden, Barrett, and Ostroff (the developers of the games that inspired the puzzles in Order of the Sinking Star) as well as contributions from Patrick Traynor (Patrick's Parabox), Zach Polansky (Enigmash), and Marc Ten Bosch (Miegakure). Blow considered that part of the game's goal was to give recognition to these games, giving them a graphical makeover from their original web browsers versions. Combining all these mechanics also was a challenge, which Blow described as a "game design supercollider". After Edge magazine noted that the sheer size of the map reminded them of Elden Ring, Blow noted that at some point he too started to think of the game "as the Elden Ring of puzzle games".

In December 2025, Hazelden made a series of statements on social media both praising the game and lamenting Blow's controversial beliefs did not align with his own, such as on diversity, equity, and inclusion. Ostroff and Barrett followed up with statements of agreement on their respective social media accounts. Hazelden announced that he would be using his profits from the game to fund and uplift less privileged creators. Blow opted not to respond to these remarks, instead focusing on completing the game, saying that players only expect good games and not political discourse between developers. Arc Games stated that "Individual creators may hold personal views on a variety of topics, but those views are their own and do not represent our company" and they remained "committed to fostering an inclusive environment". After the game's demo was released and appeared to be missing credits from these contributors, Thekla said that all contributors will be acknowledged in the full game's credits as well as in information provided to MobyGames and press outlets.

== Release ==
The game was announced at The Game Awards on December 11, 2025. The trailer revealed that the game would feature over 1000 puzzles and be released in 2026. In June 2026 it was announced that a PC demo would be globally available for one week as part of Steam Next Fest, starting from 15 June 2026. At the conclusion of Steam Next Fest, it was announced that the demo would continue to be made available for a limited time. The game was released for Nintendo Switch 2, PlayStation 5, and Windows on October 8, 2026.

Physical versions of the game will be released for Nintendo Switch 2 and PlayStation 5 by PM Studios in 2027.

== Reception ==
Reception

Aggregate scores
| Aggregator | Score |
|---|---|
| Metacritic | NS2: 85/100; PC: 83/100; PS5: 86/100 |
| OpenCritic | 90% recommend |

Review scores
| Publication | Score |
|---|---|
| GameSpot | 8/10 |
| Hardcore Gamer | 4/5 |
| Nintendo Life | 8/10 |
| Push Square | 6/10 |
| Shacknews | 10/10 |
| The Games Machine (Italy) | 8.8/10 |

Order of the Sinking Star received "generally favorable" reviews from critics, according to review aggregator Metacritic. OpenCritic determined that 90% of critics recommended the game.

Order of the Sinking Star received nominations for "Best Indie Game" and "PC Game of the Year" at the Golden Joystick Awards 2026.
