= List of four-dimensional games =

This is a list of four-dimensional games—specifically, a list of video games that take place in four-dimensional space.

== Games ==
Title	Genre	Author	First public release date	Software license	Programming language	4D visualization	Stereoscopic view	Ref.
Slice: 4D Shooter	FPS	Timofei Molokov	2025	AGPL	Rust	Ray marching	No	
2048 4D	puzzle	Huon Wilson, based on 2048 by Gabriele Cirulli	2014	MIT	JavaScript	2D sections	No	
4D Blocks	building blocks and trains	John McIntosh	2013	Public Domain	Java	perspective projection	Yes	
4D Building Blocks	puzzle	Henryk Trappmann	2006	?	Java	parallel projection	Yes	
4D Games	sandbox / variety	Joe Subbiani	2024	?	C#	3D sections, 2D sections, perspective projection	No	
4D Golf	casual	CodeParade	2024	?	C#	3D section	No	
4D Intuition	maze	Yu Gu	2026 (Demo)	?	?	perspective projection	No	
4D Maze	maze	?	2010	?	C#	text	No	
4dmaze	maze	Andreas Fackler	2015	MIT	JavaScript	2D sections	No	
4D Maze	maze	Jeff Weeks	2015	GPL	C	3D + color	No	
4D Maze Game	maze	John McIntosh	2002	Public Domain	Java	perspective projection	Yes	
4D Miner	sandbox	Mashpoe	2022 (demo)	?	C++	3D section	No	
4D Minesweeper	puzzle	Julian Schlüntz	2018	?	?	2D sections	No	
4D Tic-Tac-Toe	table	Sean Bridges	1998	?	Java	2D sections	No	
4D Toys	sandbox	Marc Ten Bosch	2017	?	?	3D section, perspective projection	Yes	
4DTris	puzzle	Laszlo Simon	1999	GPL	C	perspective projection	Yes	
54321	puzzle	Patrick Stein	2001	free	C++	2D sections	No	
5D Chess with Multiverse Time Travel	chess variant	Thunkspace	2020	Proprietary	C++	2D sections	No	
Adanaxis	FPS / Space Sim	Mushware Ltd.	2005	Proprietary	C++	3D section	No	
AdanaxisGPL	FPS / Space Sim	Mushware Ltd.	2005	GPL	C++	3D section	No	
Arena4D	Arcade	Tessimal	2025, December 13th	Proprietary	GDScript	Orthographic + perspective colored W wireframe projection	No	
Brane (formerly Tetraspace)	puzzle	Riccardo Antonelli	2015 (demo)	?	Unity	3D sections	No	
Cake4D	action-adventure	TAP OK G	2022	?	Java	3D section	No	
Chesseract	table	Jim Aikin, Robert Price	1999	Proprietary	zrf	2D sections	No	
Daedalus (4D maze)	maze	Walter D. Pullen	2003	GPL	C++	3D section	No	
Daedalus (5D maze)	maze	Walter D. Pullen	2005	GPL	C++	parallel projection	No	
Dascant	FPS	Alem Dain, Jeremy Holman	2005	GPL	C++, Java	3D section	No	
Four-Dimensional Maze	maze	Christos Jonathan Seth Hayward	1989	?	Java	2D sections	No	
Fourd (Tessercraft)	sandbox	Ben Sigma	2015	?	C++	?	Yes (VR)	
FourDViewerWeb	maze, platformer, etc.	dearsip	2023	?	C#	3D persective projection	Yes (VR)	
Frac4d	puzzle	Per Bergland, Max Tegmark	1990	Proprietary	?	3D sections	No	
Fractal Block World (Note: Fractal Block World is neither canonically nor apparently four dimensional and is only included by technicallity as gameplay can be reinterpreted as taking place in 3-horospherical slices of four-dimensional hyperbolic space.)	puzzle, first-person shooter	Dan Hathaway	2021	Proprietary	?	3D sections (no rotation)	No	
Hipercubo	puzzle	Studio Avante	2010	Proprietary	?	perspective projection	No	
Hyper	first-person	Greg Seyranian, Barb Krug, Geraldine Laurent, Scott Richman, Philippe Colantoni, Mike D'Zmura	1998	GPL	C++	3D section	No	
Hypercube	skill	Harmen van der Wal	1998	GPL	Java	perspective projection	Yes	
HyperLatin²	puzzle	Chris Moss	2010	GPL	C	3D sections	No	
Hypermaze	maze	Gondwana Software	2015	Proprietary	Java	3D section	No	
Hyperspeedcube	puzzle	Andrew Farkas	2022	MIT/Apache	Rust	perspective projection	No	
HyperTetris	puzzle	Greg Kaiser	1996	?	C	3D sections	No	
Hyperspace Invaders	multidirectional shoot 'em up	Wyley Dai	2003	?	C++	?	No	
Lobby 4D	multiplayer	Tessimal	2024, November 15th	Proprietary	GDScript	Orthographic + perspective colored W wireframe projection	No	
Magic120cell	puzzle	Roice Nelson	2008	?	?	perspective projection	No	
Magic Cube 4D	puzzle	Don Hatch, Melinda Green	c. 1988	Public Domain	Java	perspective projection	No	
Miegakure	platform / puzzle	Marc ten Bosch	Under development	?	?	3D section	No	
Moena	flight simulator / variety	Medenacci Games	2019 (demo)	Proprietary	C++	Perspective projection, point cloud	No	
Pacman 5D	maze	Andrey Astrelin	c. 2006	?	?	chromatic/perspective projection	No	
Polytope Tetris	puzzle	David Risney	2003	?	Java	3D sections	No	
TAK4D - 4D maze and 4D Snake	maze and snake	Jeff Bigot	2021	?	JavaScript	4 3D sections	No	
Tesseract 261	puzzle	DPH Software	2024	?	Unity	unfolding to 3D	No	
Tesseract!	puzzle	Anthony Grahn	2013	Proprietary	?	perspective projection	No	
Tesseract Explorer	first-person	Jason Hise	2008	?	C++	unfolding to 3D	No	
Tesseract Explorer	interactive visualization	Tarek Sherif	2020	MIT	JavaScript	orthographic projection, perspective projection	No	
Tessercraft	sandbox	Tessimal, Ashandelle	2026 (demo)	Proprietary	Rust, GDScript	Multiple options, Ray Tracing	No	
Tesserian	puzzle	Henryk Trappmann	2026	Proprietary	C# (Unity)	parallel projection+3D sections+chromatic	Yes (VR)	
Title	Genre	Author	First public release date	Software license	Programming language	4D visualization	Stereoscopic view	Ref.

== See also ==
- Fourth dimension (disambiguation)
- List of stereoscopic video games
- n-dimensional sequential move puzzle
- Stereoscopy
