= Fourth dimension =

Fourth dimension may refer to:

== Science ==
- Time in physics, the continued progress of existence and events
- Four-dimensional space, the concept of a fourth spatial dimension
- Spacetime, the unification of time and space as a four-dimensional continuum
- Minkowski space, the mathematical setting for special relativity

== Arts and media ==
- Fourth dimension in art

=== Film ===
- The Fourth Dimension, a 1988 experimental film by Zbigniew Rybczyński
- The 4th Dimension (film), a 2008 film
- The Fourth Dimension (film), a 2012 film made up of three segments, each with a different director

=== Literature ===
- Fourth dimension in literature
- The Fourth Dimension (book), a 1984 non-fiction book by Rudy Rucker
- The Fourth Dimension, a book by David Yonggi Cho
- The Fourth Dimension, a book by P. D. Ouspensky

=== Music ===
- The Fourth Dimension (Hypocrisy album), 1994
- The Fourth Dimension (Jack McDuff album), 1974
- Fourth Dimension (Stratovarius album), 1995
- Fourth Dimension (Radiophonic album), by Paddy Kingsland
- Fourth Dimension Records, a UK record label
- "The 4th Dimension", a song by Devo on their album Shout
- "Fourth Dimension", a song by Lights on her album Siberia
- 4th Dimension, a jazz fusion quartet founded in 2007 by John McLaughlin
- "4th Dimension" (song), a song by Kids See Ghosts on their 2018 album Kids See Ghosts

== Computing ==
- The Fourth Dimension (company), a publisher of computer games
- 4th Dimension (software), a relational database management system

== Other ==
- Four-dimensionalism, a philosophical view
- 4th Dimension roller coaster, a type of roller coaster

== See also ==
- 4D (disambiguation)
- Four Dimensions (disambiguation)
