= N-dimensional sequential move puzzle =

Generalization of the Rubik's Cube in n-dimensions

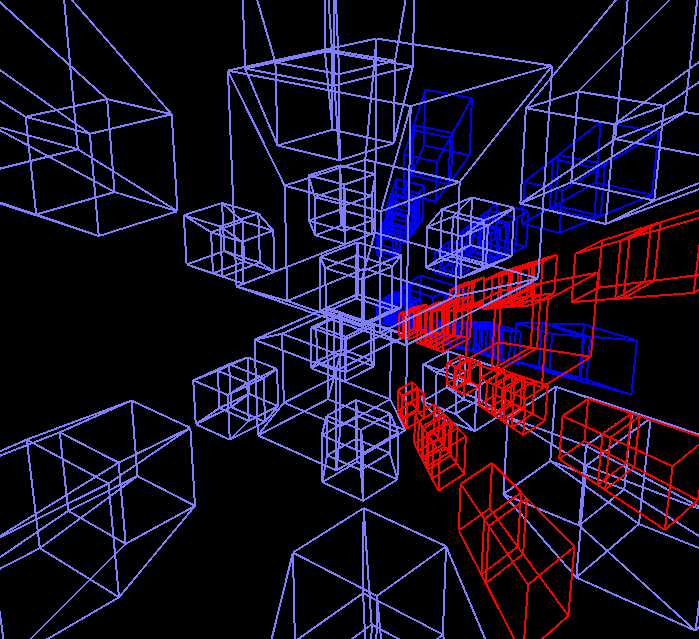
A five-dimensional 2^{5} puzzle partial cutaway, demonstrating that even with the minimum size in 5-D the puzzle is far from trivial.

The Rubik’s Cube is the original and best-known of the three-dimensional sequential move puzzles. Over the years, many virtual implementations of this puzzle have been created in software. Extending these ideas naturally leads to the development of sequential move puzzles in four or more dimensions. The rules governing their operation are rigorously defined mathematically and are closely related to principles of three-dimensional geometry. As a result, they can be simulated in software, and some have even been realized as physical puzzles. As with their three-dimensional counterparts, there are records for solvers, although there is not yet the same level of competitive organisation.

== Glossary ==
- Vertex. A zero-dimensional point at which higher-dimension figures meet.
- Edge. A one-dimensional figure at which higher-dimension figures meet.
- Face. A two-dimensional figure at which (for objects of dimension greater than three) higher-dimension figures meet.
- Cell. A three-dimensional figure at which (for objects of dimension greater than four) higher-dimension figures meet.
- n-Polytope. A n-dimensional figure continuing as above. A specific geometric shape may replace polytope where this is appropriate, such as 4-cube to mean the tesseract.
- n-cell. A higher-dimension figure containing n cells.
- Piece. A single moveable part of the puzzle having the same dimensionality as the whole puzzle.
- Cubie. In the solving community this is the term generally used for a 'piece'.
- Sticker. The coloured labels on the puzzle which identify the state of the puzzle. For instance, the corner cubies of a Rubik's cube are a single piece but each has three stickers. The stickers in higher-dimensional puzzles will have a dimensionality greater than two. For instance, in the 4-cube, the stickers are three-dimensional solids.

For comparison purposes, the data relating to the standard 3^{3} Rubik's cube is as follows;

Piece count
Number of vertices (V)	8	Number of 3-colour pieces	8
Number of edges (E)	12	Number of 2-colour pieces	12
Number of faces (F)	6	Number of 1-colour pieces	6
Number of cells (C)	1	Number of 0-colour pieces	1
Number of coloured pieces (P)	26
Number of stickers	54

Number of achievable combinations $= \frac{12!\cdot 8!}{2} \cdot \frac{2^{12}}{2} \cdot \frac{3^8}{3} \sim 10^{20}$

There is some debate over whether the face-centre cubies should be counted as separate pieces as they cannot be moved relative to each other. A different number of pieces may be given in different sources. In this article the face-centre cubies are counted as this makes the arithmetical sequences more consistent and they can certainly be rotated, a solution of which requires algorithms. However, the cubie right in the middle is not counted because it has no visible stickers and hence requires no solution. Arithmetically we should have

$$P = V+E+F+C \,\!$$

But P is always one short of this (or the n-dimensional extension of this formula) in the figures given in this article because C (or the corresponding highest-dimension polytope, for higher dimensions) is not being counted.

== Magic 4D Cube ==
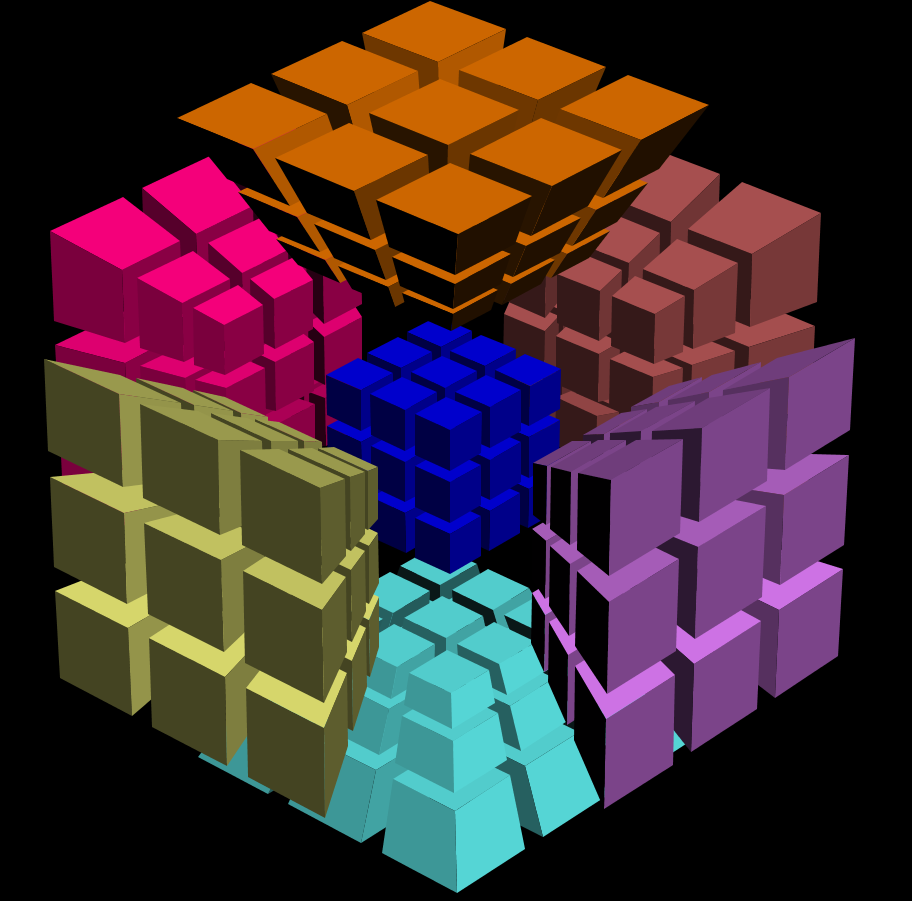
4-cube 3^{4} virtual puzzle, solved. In this projection one cell is not shown. The position of this cell is the extreme foreground of the 4th dimension beyond the position of the viewer's screen.

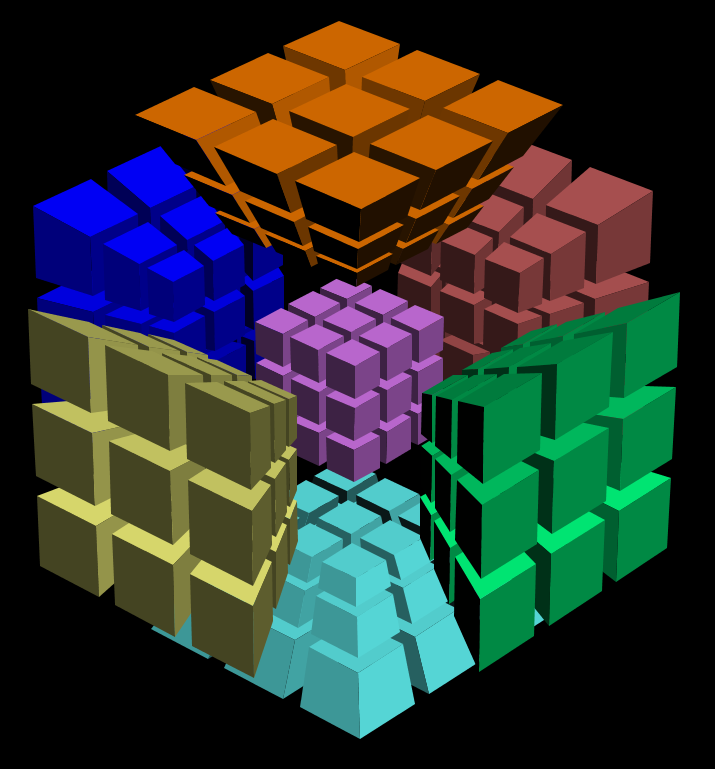
4-cube 3^{4} virtual puzzle, rotated in the 4th dimension to show the colour of the hidden cell.

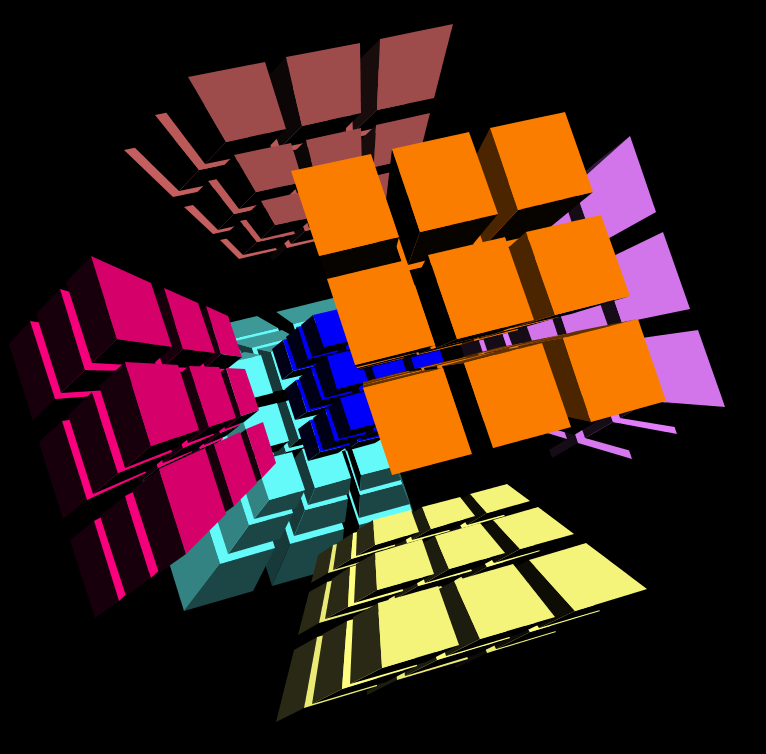
4-cube 3^{4} virtual puzzle, rotated in normal 3D space.

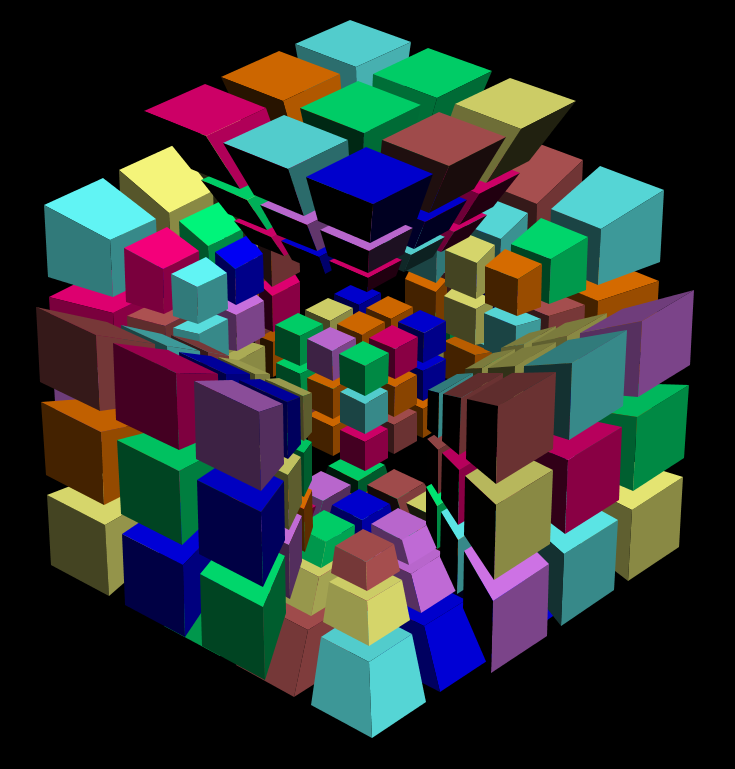
4-cube 3^{4} virtual puzzle, scrambled.

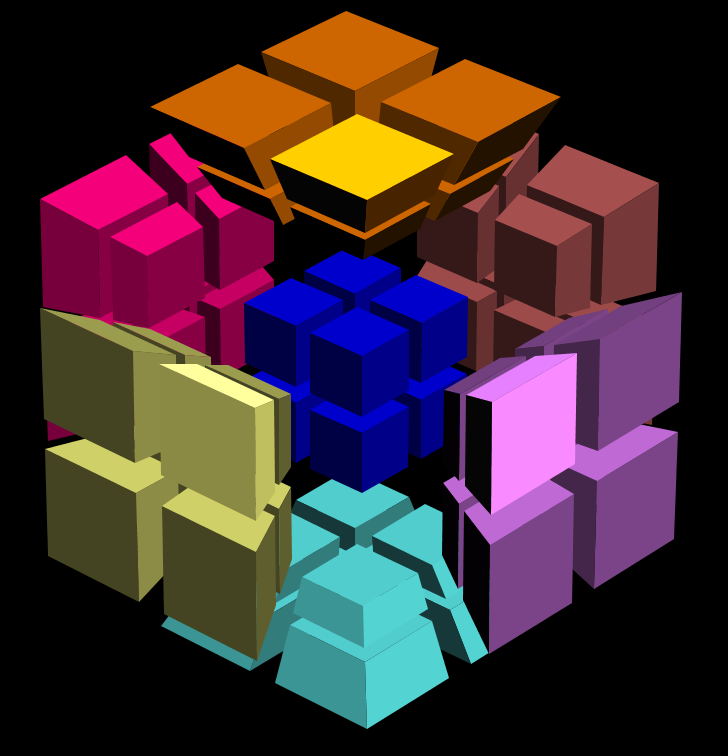
4-cube 2^{4} virtual puzzle, one cubie is highlighted to show how the stickers are distributed across the cube. Note that there are four stickers on each of the cubies of the 2^{4} puzzle but only three are highlighted, the missing one is on the hidden cell.

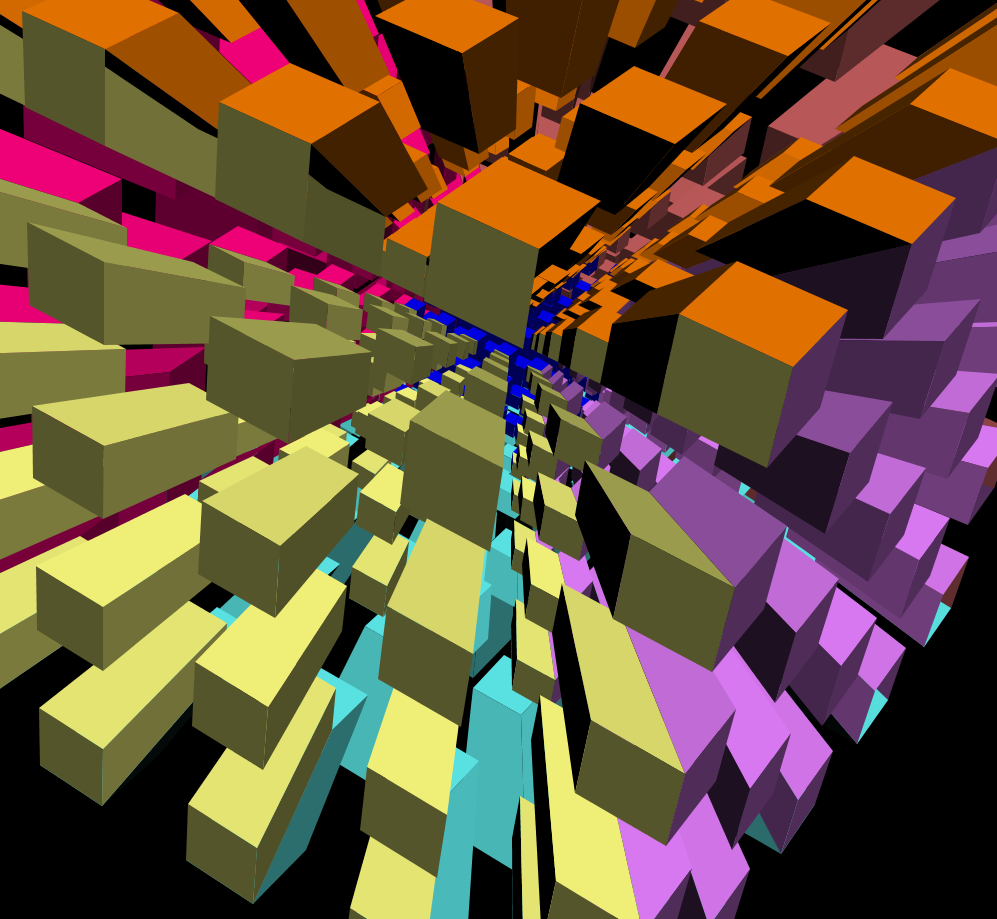
4-cube 5^{4} virtual puzzle with stickers of the same cubie made to exactly touch each other.

Geometric shape: Tesseract

The Superliminal MagicCube4D software implements many twisty puzzle versions of 4D polytopes including N^{4} cubes. The UI allows for 4D twists and rotations plus control of 4D viewing parameters such as the projection into 3D, cubie size and spacing, and sticker size.

Superliminal Software maintains a Hall of Fame for record breaking solvers of this puzzle.

=== 3^{4} 4-cube ===
Piece count
Number of vertices	16	Number of 4-colour pieces	16
Number of edges	32	Number of 3-colour pieces	32
Number of faces	24	Number of 2-colour pieces	24
Number of cells	8	Number of 1-colour pieces	8
Number of 4-cubes	1	Number of 0-colour pieces	1
Number of coloured pieces	80
Number of stickers	216

Achievable combinations:

$$= \frac{24!\cdot 32!}{2}\cdot \frac{16!}{2}\cdot 2^{23}\cdot (3!)^{31} \cdot 3 \cdot {\left( \frac{4!}{2} \right)}^{15} \cdot 4$$

$$=2^{84}\cdot 3^{47} \cdot 16! \cdot 24! \cdot 32!$$

$$\sim 10^{120}\,\!$$

=== 2^{4} 4-cube ===
Piece count
Number of vertices	16	Number of 4-colour pieces	16
Number of edges	32	Number of 3-colour pieces	0
Number of faces	24	Number of 2-colour pieces	0
Number of cells	8	Number of 1-colour pieces	0
Number of 4-cubes	1	Number of 0-colour pieces	0
Number of coloured pieces	16
Number of stickers	64

Achievable combinations:

$${} =\frac{15!}{2}\cdot {\left( \frac{4!}{2} \right)}^{14} \cdot 4$$

$${} =2^{29} \cdot 3^{14} \cdot 15!$$

$${} \sim 10^{28} \,\!$$

=== 4^{4} 4-cube ===
Piece count
Number of vertices	16	Number of 4-colour pieces	16
Number of edges	32	Number of 3-colour pieces	64
Number of faces	24	Number of 2-colour pieces	96
Number of cells	8	Number of 1-colour pieces	64
Number of 4-cubes	1	Number of 0-colour pieces	16
Number of coloured pieces	240
Number of stickers	512

Achievable combinations:

$$= \frac{15!}{2} \cdot \left( \frac{4!}{2} \right)^{14} \cdot 4 \cdot \frac{64!}{2} \cdot 3^{63} \cdot \frac{96! \cdot 2}{2 \cdot (4!)^{24}} \cdot \frac{2^{95} \cdot 64! \cdot 2}{2 \cdot (8!)^8}$$

$$=2^{51}\cdot 3^{53}\cdot {(8!)}^{-8}\cdot 15!\cdot {(64!)}^{2}\cdot 96!$$

$$\sim 10^{334} \,\!$$

=== 5^{4} 4-cube ===
Piece count
Number of vertices	16	Number of 4-colour pieces	16
Number of edges	32	Number of 3-colour pieces	96
Number of faces	24	Number of 2-colour pieces	216
Number of cells	8	Number of 1-colour pieces	216
Number of 4-cubes	1	Number of 0-colour pieces	81
Number of coloured pieces	544
Number of stickers	1000

Achievable combinations:

$= \frac{48!}{(6!)^8} \cdot \frac{96!}{(12!)^8} \cdot \frac{64!}{(8!)^8} \cdot \frac{24! \cdot 32!}{2} \cdot (3!)^{31} \cdot 2^{23} \cdot \frac{64!}{2} \cdot$$3^{63} \cdot 16! \cdot \left(\frac{4!}{2}\right)^{15} \cdot 4 \cdot \frac{96!}{(4!)^{24}} \cdot 2^{95} \cdot \frac{96!}{(4!)^{24}} \cdot 2^{95}$

$$= 2^{42}\cdot 3^{29}\cdot 5^{-16}\cdot 7^{-8}\cdot {(12!)}^{-8}\cdot 16!\cdot 24!\cdot 32!\cdot 48!\cdot {(64!)}^{2}\cdot {(96!)}^{3}$$

$$\sim 10^{701} \,\!$$

== Magic 5D Cube ==
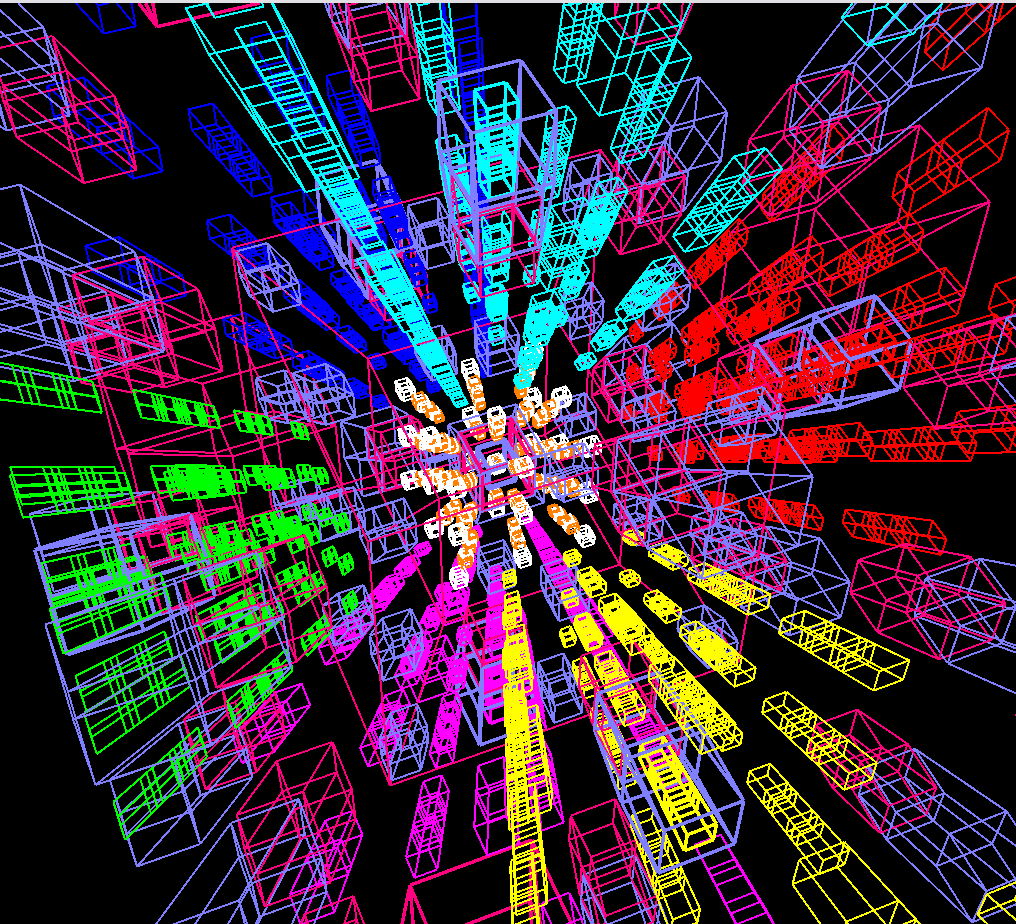
5-cube 3^{5} virtual puzzle, close in view in solved state.

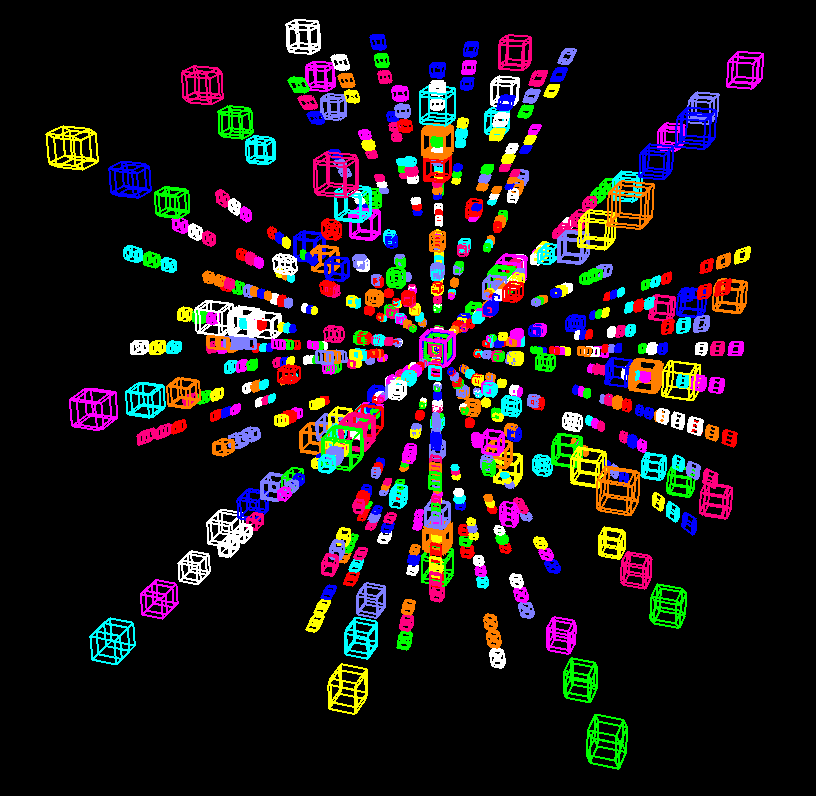
5-cube 3^{5} virtual puzzle, scrambled.

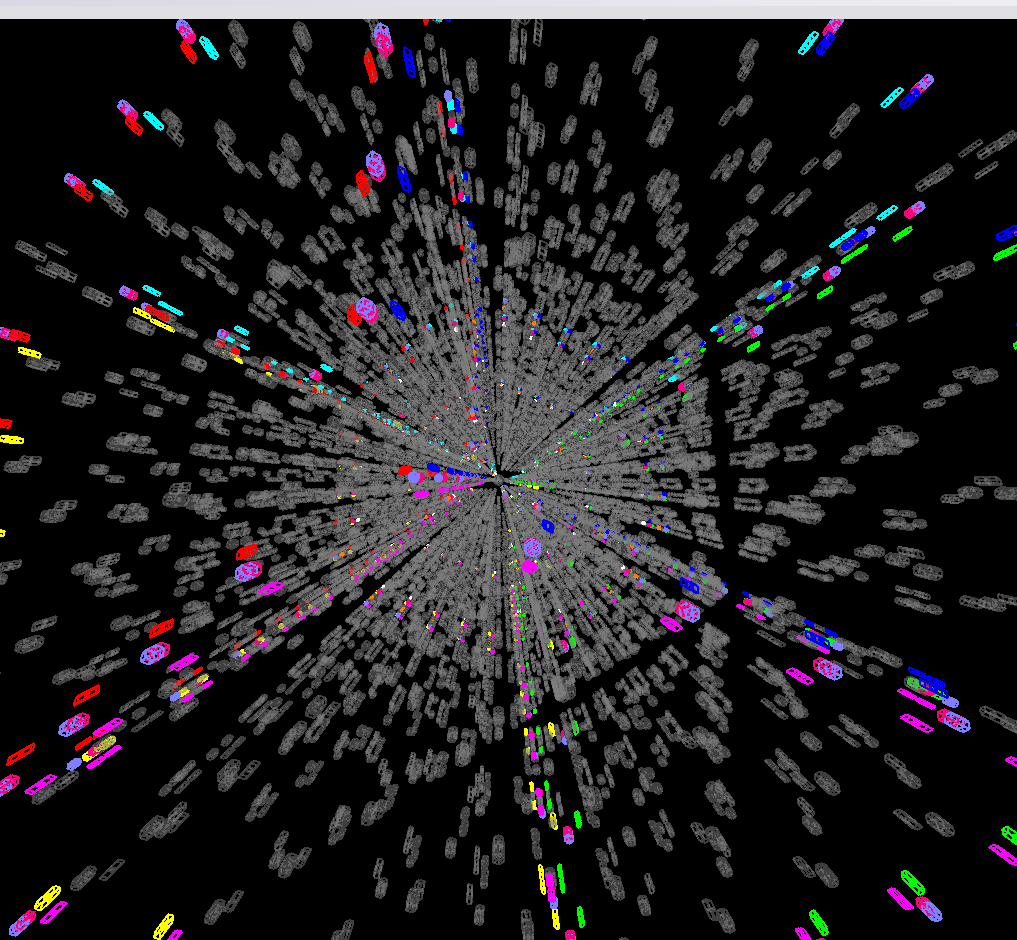
5-cube 7^{5} virtual puzzle, with certain pieces highlighted. The rest are shaded out to aid the solver's comprehension of the puzzle.

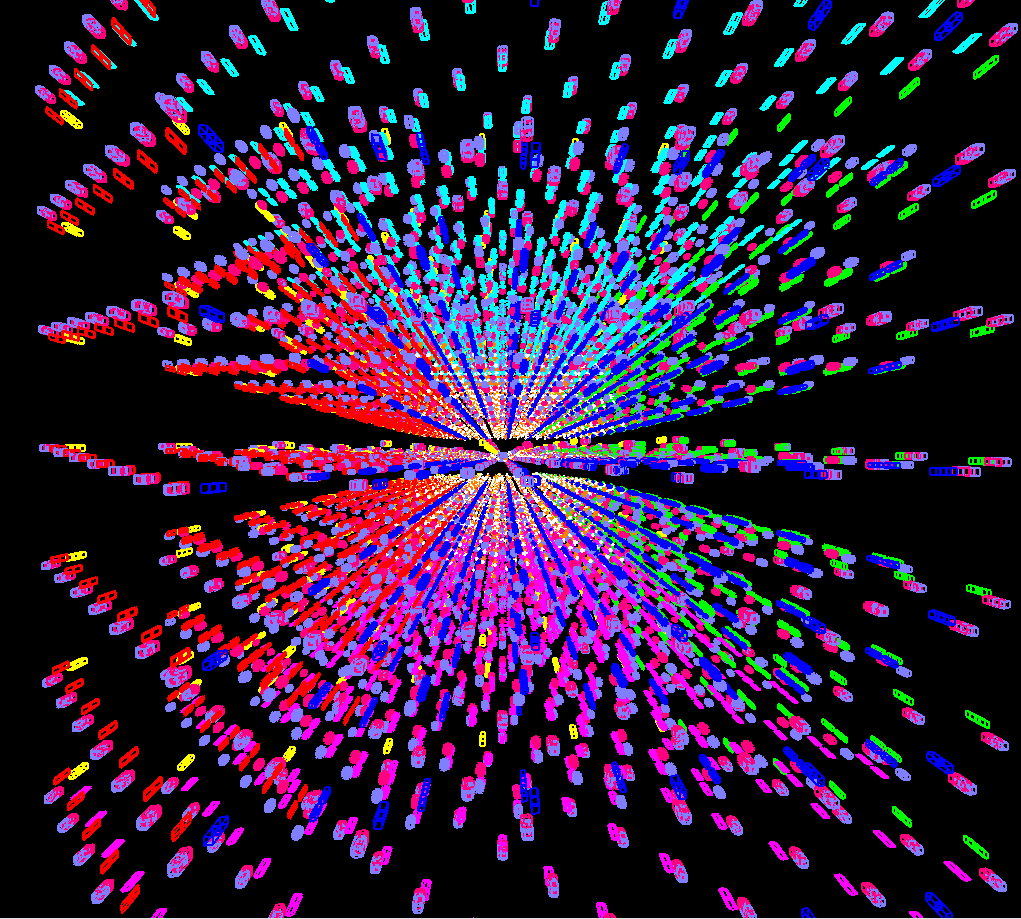
5-cube 7^{5} virtual puzzle, solved.

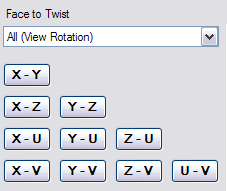
Software control panel for rotating the 5-cube, illustrating the increased number of planes of rotation possible in 5 dimensions.

Geometric shape: penteract

Magic Cube 5D by Roice Nelson is capable of rendering 5-cube puzzles in six sizes from 2^{5} to 7^{5}. Allows 5D twists and controls for rotating the cube in multiple dimensions, 4-D and 5-D perspective controls, cubie and sticker spacing and size controls, similar to Magiccube4D.

However, a 5-D puzzle is much more difficult to comprehend than a 4-D puzzle. An essential feature of the Roice's implementation is the ability to turn off or highlight chosen cubies and stickers. Even so, the complexities of the images produced are still quite severe, as can be seen from the screenshots.

Roice maintains a Hall of Insanity for record breaking solvers of this puzzle. As of 6 January 2011, there have been two successful solutions for the 7^{5} size of 5-cube.

=== 3^{5} 5-cube ===
Piece count
Number of vertices	32	Number of 5-colour pieces	32
Number of edges	80	Number of 4-colour pieces	80
Number of faces	80	Number of 3-colour pieces	80
Number of cells	40	Number of 2-colour pieces	40
Number of 4-cubes	10	Number of 1-colour pieces	10
Number of 5-cubes	1	Number of 0-colour pieces	1
Number of coloured pieces	242
Number of stickers	810

Achievable combinations:

$$= \frac{32!}{2}\cdot 60^{32}\cdot \frac{80!}{2}\cdot \frac{24^{80}}{2}\cdot \frac{40!\cdot 80!}{2}\cdot \frac{6^{80}}{2}\cdot \frac{2^{40}}{2}$$

$$=2^{418}\cdot 3^{192}\cdot 5^{32}\cdot 32!\cdot 40!\cdot {(80!)}^2$$

$$\sim 10^{561} \,\!$$

=== 2^{5} 5-cube ===
Piece count
Number of vertices	32	Number of 5-colour pieces	32
Number of edges	80	Number of 4-colour pieces	0
Number of faces	80	Number of 3-colour pieces	0
Number of cells	40	Number of 2-colour pieces	0
Number of 4-cubes	10	Number of 1-colour pieces	0
Number of 5-cubes	1	Number of 0-colour pieces	0
Number of coloured pieces	32
Number of stickers	160

Achievable combinations:

$$= \frac{31!}{2}\cdot 60^{31}$$

$$\sim 10^{89} \,\!$$

=== 4^{5} 5-cube ===
Piece count
Number of vertices	32	Number of 5-colour pieces	32
Number of edges	80	Number of 4-colour pieces	160
Number of faces	80	Number of 3-colour pieces	320
Number of cells	40	Number of 2-colour pieces	320
Number of 4-cubes	10	Number of 1-colour pieces	160
Number of 5-cubes	1	Number of 0-colour pieces	32
Number of coloured pieces	992
Number of stickers	2,560

Achievable combinations:

$$= \frac{31!}{2} \cdot  60^{31} \cdot \frac{160!}{2} \cdot \frac{12^{160}}{3} \cdot \frac{320!}{24^{80}} \cdot \frac{6^{320}}{2} \cdot \frac{320!}{(8!)^{40}} \cdot \frac{2^{320}}{2} \cdot \frac{160!}{(16!)^{10}}$$

$$=2^{498}\cdot 3^{350}\cdot 5^{-9}\cdot 7^{-40}\cdot {(16!)}^{-10}\cdot 31!\cdot {(160!)}^2\cdot {(320!)}^2$$

$$\sim 10^{2075} \,\!$$

=== 5^{5} 5-cube ===
Piece count
Number of vertices	32	Number of 5-colour pieces	32
Number of edges	80	Number of 4-colour pieces	240
Number of faces	80	Number of 3-colour pieces	720
Number of cells	40	Number of 2-colour pieces	1,080
Number of 4-cubes	10	Number of 1-colour pieces	810
Number of 5-cubes	1	Number of 0-colour pieces	243
Number of coloured pieces	2,882
Number of stickers	6,250

Achievable combinations:

$$\begin{matrix}
= \frac{32!}{2}\cdot 60^{32}\cdot \frac{80!}{2}\cdot \frac{24^{80}}{2}\cdot \frac{160!}{2} \cdot \frac{12^{160}}{3} \cdot \frac{40!\cdot 80!}{2} \cdot \frac{6^{80}}{2}\cdot \frac{2^{40}}{2} \cdot \frac{320!}{24^{80}} \cdot \frac{6^{320}}{2} \cdot \frac{320!}{24^{80}} \cdot \frac{6^{320}}{2} \cdot \frac{240!}{(6!)^{40}} \cdot \frac{2^{240}}{2} \cdot \frac{320!}{(8!)^{40}} \cdot \frac{2^{320}}{2} \cdot \frac{480!}{(12!)^{40}} \cdot \frac{2^{480}}{2} \cdot \frac{80!}{(8!)^{10}} \cdot \frac{160!}{(16!)^{10}} \cdot \\
\frac{240!}{(24!)^{10}} \cdot \frac{320!}{(32!)^{10}}
\end{matrix}$$

$$=2^{873}\cdot 3^{391}\cdot 5^{-168}\cdot 7^{-110}\cdot 11^{-50}\cdot 13^{-10}\cdot {(24!)}^{-10}\cdot {(32!)}^{-9}\cdot 40!\cdot {(80!)}^3\cdot {(160!)}^2\cdot {(240!)}^2\cdot {(320!)}^4\cdot 480!$$

$$\sim 10^{5267} \,\!$$

=== 6^{5} 5-cube ===
Piece count
Number of vertices	32	Number of 5-colour pieces	32
Number of edges	80	Number of 4-colour pieces	320
Number of faces	80	Number of 3-colour pieces	1,280
Number of cells	40	Number of 2-colour pieces	2,560
Number of 4-cubes	10	Number of 1-colour pieces	2,560
Number of 5-cubes	1	Number of 0-colour pieces	1,024
Number of coloured pieces	6,752
Number of stickers	12,960

Achievable combinations:

$$\begin{matrix}= \frac{31!}{2}\cdot 60^{31}\cdot \frac{160!}{2}\cdot \frac{12^{160}}{3}\cdot \frac{160!}{2}\cdot \frac{12^{160}}{3}\cdot \frac{320!}{24^{80}}\cdot \frac{6^{320}}{2}\cdot \frac{320!}{24^{80}}\cdot \frac{6^{320}}{2}\cdot \frac{640!}{24^{160}}\cdot \frac{3^{640}}{3}\cdot \frac{320!}{8!^{40}}\cdot \frac{2^{320}}{2}\cdot \frac{320!}{8!^{40}}\cdot \frac{2^{320}}{2}\cdot \frac{960!}{24!^{40}}\cdot \frac{2^{960}}{2}\cdot \frac{960!}{24!^{40}}\cdot \frac{2^{960}}{2}\cdot \frac{640!}{64!^{10}}\cdot \frac{960!}{96!^{10}}\cdot \\
\frac{640!}{64!^{10}}\cdot \frac{160!}{16!^{10}}\cdot \frac{160!}{16!^{10}}
\end{matrix}$$

$$\sim 10^{11441} \,\!$$

=== 7^{5} 5-cube ===
Piece count
Number of vertices	32	Number of 5-colour pieces	32
Number of edges	80	Number of 4-colour pieces	400
Number of faces	80	Number of 3-colour pieces	2,000
Number of cells	40	Number of 2-colour pieces	5,000
Number of 4-cubes	10	Number of 1-colour pieces	6,250
Number of 5-cubes	1	Number of 0-colour pieces	3,125
Number of coloured pieces	13,682
Number of stickers	24,010

Achievable combinations:

$$\begin{matrix}
= \frac{32!}{2}\cdot 60^{32}\cdot \frac{80!}{2}\cdot \frac{24^{80}}{2}\cdot \frac{160!}{2}\cdot \frac{12^{160}}{3}\cdot \frac{160!}{2}\cdot \frac{12^{160}}{3}\cdot \frac{80!\cdot 40!}{2}\cdot \frac{6^{80}}{2}\cdot \frac{2^{40}}{2}\cdot \frac{320!}{24^{80}}\cdot \frac{6^{320}}{2}\cdot \frac{320!}{24^{80}}\cdot \frac{6^{320}}{2}\cdot \frac{320!}{24^{80}}\cdot \frac{6^{320}}{2}\cdot \frac{640!}{24^{160}}\cdot \frac{3^{640}}{3}\cdot \frac{320!}{24^{80}}\cdot \frac{6^{320}}{2}\cdot \frac{240!}{6!^{40}}\cdot \\
\frac{2^{240}}{2}\cdot \frac{480!}{12!^{40}}\cdot \frac{2^{480}}{2}\cdot \frac{320!}{8!^{40}}\cdot \frac{2^{320}}{2}\cdot \frac{240!}{6!^{40}}\cdot \frac{2^{240}}{2}\cdot \frac{960!}{24!^{40}}\cdot \frac{2^{960}}{2}\cdot \frac{960!}{24!^{40}}\cdot \frac{2^{960}}{2}\cdot \frac{480!}{12!^{40}}\cdot \frac{2^{480}}{2}\cdot \frac{960!}{24!^{40}}\cdot \frac{2^{960}}{2}\cdot \frac{320!}{8!^{40}}\cdot \frac{2^{320}}{2}\cdot \frac{80!}{8!^{10}}\cdot \frac{240!}{24!^{10}}\cdot \frac{320!}{32!^{10}}\cdot \frac{160!}{16!^{10}}\cdot \frac{80!}{8!^{10}}\cdot \\
\frac{480!}{48!^{10}}\cdot \frac{960!}{96!^{10}}\cdot \frac{640!}{64!^{10}}\cdot \frac{240!}{24!^{10}}\cdot \frac{960!}{96!^{10}}\cdot \frac{960!}{96!^{10}}\cdot \frac{320!}{32!^{10}}\cdot \frac{640!}{64!^{10}}\cdot \frac{160!}{16!^{10}}
\end{matrix}$$

$$\sim 10^{21503} \,\!$$

== Magic Cube 7D ==
Geometric shape: hexeract (6D) and hepteract (7D)

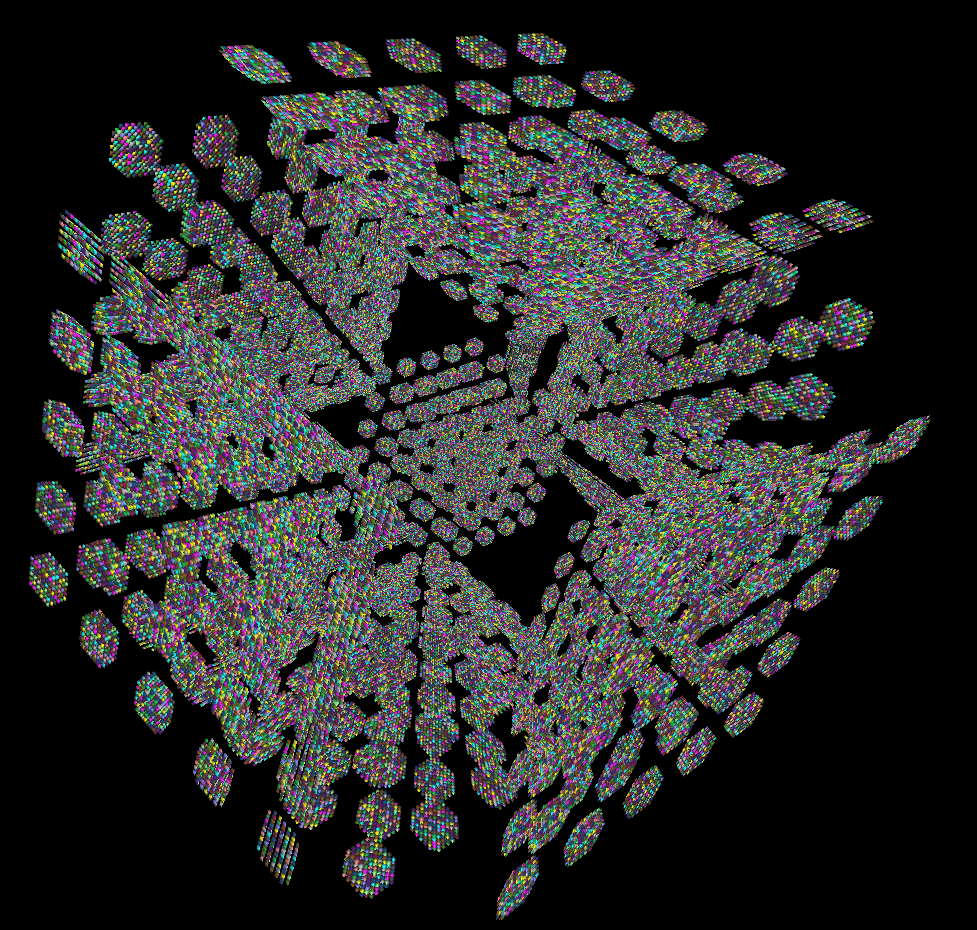
7-cube 5^{7} virtual puzzle, scrambled.

Andrey Astrelin's Magic Cube 7D software is capable of rendering puzzles of up to 7 dimensions in twelve sizes from 3^{4} to 5^{7}.

As of July 2024, in terms of puzzles exclusive to Magic Cube 7D, only the 3^{6}, 3^{7}, 4^{6}, and 5^{6} puzzles have been solved.

== Magic 120-cell ==
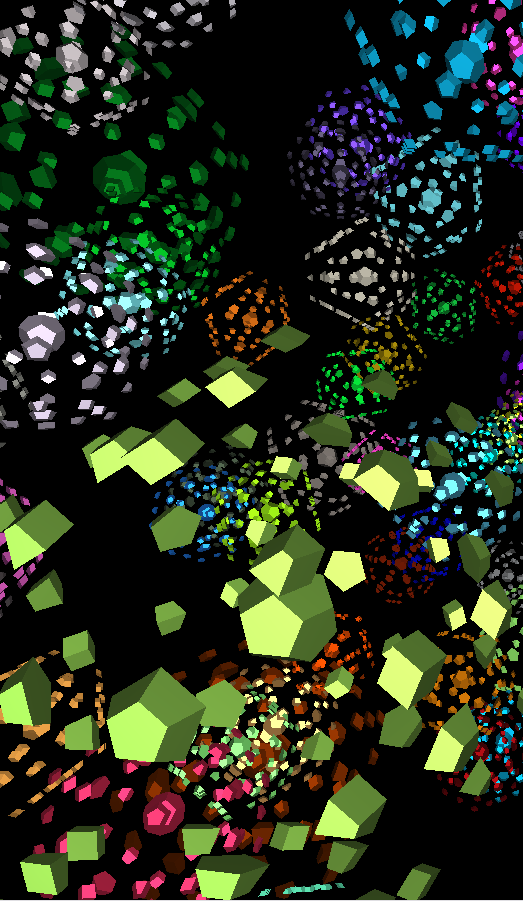
120-cell virtual puzzle, close in view in solved state

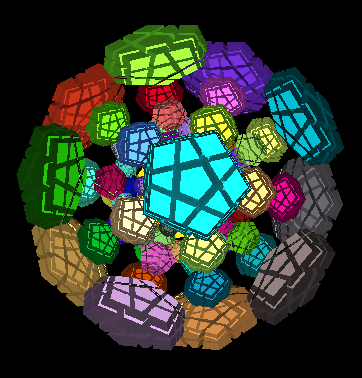
120-cell virtual puzzle, solved

Geometric shape: 120-cell (also called the hecatonicosachoron or dodecacontachoron)

The 120-cell is a 4-D geometric figure (4-polytope) composed of 120 dodecahedra, which in turn is a 3-D figure composed of 12 pentagons. The 120-cell is the 4-D analogue of the dodecahedron in the same way that the tesseract (4-cube) is the 4-D analogue of the cube. The 4-D 120-cell software sequential move puzzle from Gravitation3d is therefore the 4-D analogue of the Megaminx, 3-D puzzle, which has the shape of a dodecahedron.

The puzzle is rendered in only one size, that is three cubies on a side, but in six colouring schemes of varying difficulty. The full puzzle requires a different colour for each cell, that is 120 colours. This large number of colours adds to the difficulty of the puzzle in that some shades are quite difficult to tell apart. The easiest form is two interlocking tori, each torus forming a ring of cubies in different dimensions. The full list of colouring schemes is as follows;

- 2-colour tori.
- 9-colour 4-cube cells. That is, the same colouring scheme as the 4-cube.
- 9-colour layers.
- 12-colour rings.
- 60-colour antipodal. Each pair of diametrically opposed dodecahedron cells is the same colour.
- 120-colour full puzzle.

The controls are very similar to the 4-D Magic Cube with controls for 4-D perspective, cell size, sticker size and distance and the usual zoom and rotation. Additionally, there is the ability to completely turn off groups of cells based on selection of tori, 4-cube cells, layers or rings.

Gravitation3d has created a "Hall of Fame" for solvers, who must provide a log file for their solution. As of April 2017, the puzzle has been solved twelve times.

Piece count
Number of vertices	600	Number of 4-colour pieces	600
Number of edges	1,200	Number of 3-colour pieces	1,200
Number of faces	720	Number of 2-colour pieces	720
Number of cells	120	Number of 1-colour pieces	120
Number of 4-cells	1	Number of 0-colour pieces	1
Number of coloured pieces	2,640
Number of stickers	7,560

Achievable combinations:

$$= \frac{600!}{2} \cdot \frac{1200!}{2} \cdot \frac{720!}{2} \cdot \frac{2^{720}}{2} \cdot \frac{6^{1200}}{2} \cdot \frac{12^{600}}{3}$$

$$=2^{3115}\cdot 3^{1799}\cdot 600!\cdot 720!\cdot 1200!$$

$$\sim 10^{8126}\,$$

This calculation of achievable combinations has not been mathematically proven and can only be considered an upper bound. Its derivation assumes the existence of the set of algorithms needed to make all the "minimal change" combinations. There is no reason to suppose that these algorithms will not be found since puzzle solvers have succeeded in finding them on all similar puzzles that have so far been solved.

== 3x3 2D square ==
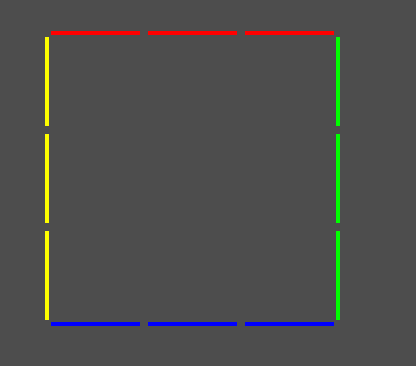
2-cube 3×3 virtual puzzle

Geometric shape: square

A 2-D Rubik type puzzle can no more be physically constructed than a 4-D one can. A 3-D puzzle could be constructed with no stickers on the third dimension which would then behave as a 2-D puzzle but the true implementation of the puzzle remains in the virtual world. The implementation shown here is from Superliminal who call it the 2D Magic Cube.

The puzzle is not of any great interest to solvers as its solution is quite trivial. In large part this is because it is not possible to put a piece in position with a twist. Some of the most difficult algorithms on the standard Rubik's Cube are to deal with such twists where a piece is in its correct position but not in the correct orientation. With higher-dimension puzzles this twisting can take on the rather disconcerting form of a piece being apparently inside out. One has only to compare the difficulty of the 2×2×2 puzzle with the 3×3 (which has the same number of pieces) to see that this ability to cause twists in higher dimensions has much to do with difficulty, and hence satisfaction with solving, the ever popular Rubik's Cube.

Piece count
Number of vertices	4	Number of 2-colour pieces	4
Number of edges	4	Number of 1-colour pieces	4
Number of faces	1	Number of 0-colour pieces	1
Number of coloured pieces	8
Number of stickers	12

Achievable combinations:

$$=4!\,\! = 24$$

The centre pieces are in a fixed orientation relative to each other (in exactly the same way as the centre pieces on the standard 3×3×3 cube) and hence do not figure in the calculation of combinations.

This puzzle is not really a true 2-dimensional analogue of the Rubik's Cube. If the group of operations on a single polytope of an n-dimensional puzzle is defined as any rotation of an (n – 1)-dimensional polytope in (n – 1)-dimensional space then the size of the group,

- for the 5-cube is rotations of a 4-polytope in 4-space = 8×6×4 = 192,
- for the 4-cube is rotations of a 3-polytope (cube) in 3-space = 6×4 = 24,
- for the 3-cube is rotations of a 2-polytope (square) in 2-space = 4
- for the 2-cube is rotations of a 1-polytope in 1-space = 1

In other words, the 2D puzzle cannot be scrambled at all if the same restrictions are placed on the moves as for the real 3D puzzle. The moves actually given to the 2D Magic Cube are the operations of reflection. This reflection operation can be extended to higher-dimension puzzles. For the 3D cube the analogous operation would be removing a face and replacing it with the stickers facing into the cube. For the 4-cube, the analogous operation is removing a cube and replacing it inside-out.

== 1D projection ==
Another alternate-dimension puzzle is a view achievable in David Vanderschel's Magic Cube 3D. A 4-cube projected on to a 2D computer screen is an example of a general type of an n-dimensional puzzle projected on to a (n – 2)-dimensional space. The 3D analogue of this is to project the cube on to a 1-dimensional representation, which is what Vanderschel's program is capable of doing. The first recorded solve was done in December, 2022.

1-dimensional projection of the 3x3x3 Rubik's Cube as shown in Magic Cube 3D.

== See also ==
- Rubik's Cube group
- List of four dimensional games
