= Laurent Ribardière =

French programmer and computer scientist

- Born: March 11, 1964 (age 61); France
- Occupation(s): Businessman, computer scientist, and programmer

Laurent Ribardière is a French computer scientist and businessman who founded the French database software company 4D SAS and its US Subsidiary 4D Inc.

In 1984 he began development of 4th Dimension (or 4D) which was code-named Silver Surfer at the time. 4D had its initial product release in 1987 with its own programming language.

Laurent was also the original author of Wakanda and founded the Wakanda SAS company.

== Career ==
Ribardière began his career in 1982 by marketing a file management system.
