= DDDD =

DDDD may refer to:

== Arts and entertainment ==
- Dead Dead Demon's Dededede Destruction, a 2014–2022 manga series, adapted to anime in 2024
- D.D.D.D. (Destroy Devastating and Disgusting Derivatives), a 1995 album by Incapacitants
- "D.D.D.D.", the ending theme of episodes 5 and 6 of the anime series Dorohedoro

== Other uses ==
- DDDD, the Helmholtz notation for subsubcontra D (musical note)
- DDDD, a U.S. bra size
- DDDD, a non-standard SPARS code indicating digital recording equipment and musical instruments
- dddd, a code used in date formats to indicate "day of the week spelled out in full"

== See also ==
- 4D (disambiguation)
- D4 (disambiguation)
- DDD (disambiguation)
- Four Ds, the guiding principles of the Allied occupation of Germany
- The "4 Ds" of pruning
