= 5D Chess with Multiverse Time Travel =

2020 video game

- Developer: Thunkspace
- Platforms: Windows; macOS; Linux
- Release: 22 July 2020
- Genre: Chess variant
- Modes: Single-player, multiplayer

5D Chess with Multiverse Time Travel is a 2020 chess variant video game developed by Conor Petersen at American studio Thunkspace, released for Microsoft Windows, macOS, and Linux. Its titular mechanic, multiverse time travel, allows pieces to travel through time and between timelines in a similar way to how they move through ranks and files. Gameplay begins similarly to ordinary chess, but becomes more complex as players branch additional timelines. Besides the standard starting position, the game features a selection of variant starting positions. Additionally, a puzzle mode is included.

Petersen was inspired to create the game by other chess variants, including bughouse chess, three-dimensional chess, and four-player chess. The game's concept initially came from the idea of using time as a dimension of movement. The game received positive reviews from players and critics.

== Gameplay ==
The general gameplay of 5D Chess with Multiverse Time Travel starts off similarly to a standard game of chess. As the game progresses, the game becomes increasingly complex through a series of alternate timelines that the player can take advantage of. The game can be played online against other players or offline against an AI or another player sitting at the same computer.

=== Rules ===
A standard game of 5D Chess begins with an ordinary chess setup, starting on White's turn. The game has the original two axes from standard chess and two additional axes of movement:

- The file axis from standard chess, which is notated using the letters a through h for the eight files.
- The rank axis from standard chess, which is notated using the numbers 1 through 8 for the eight ranks.
- The turn axis, displayed horizontally. It represents the progression of time, going from left to right.
- The timeline axis, displayed vertically. It represents movement between timelines.

All four are considered dimensions, and pieces can move through combinations of dimensions. In this display, the vertical directions of the timeline axis are opposite for each player, but the horizontal directions of the turn axis are the same. Each point in time in each timeline is displayed as an individual board. A distance of one space corresponds to a distance of one square horizontally, one square vertically, one turn, or one timeline. Each player takes their turn by making a move or series of moves and then pressing the "Submit Moves" button. All pieces retain their movement abilities from standard chess. In addition, their movement abilities are generalized across the turn and timeline axes. The moves of the pieces are as follows:

- The rook may move any distance along exactly one axis.
- The bishop may move any distance along exactly two axes equally.
- The queen may move any distance along any number of axes equally.

When moving, the rook, bishop, and queen must move through a continuous series of unobstructed squares.

- The king may move one space along any number of axes. Castling is permitted but not generalized across turns and timelines, nor is the prohibition of castling out of or through check. (Note: Variant positions have additional considerations for castling: if all usual castling conditions are met, a king may castle with a rook of the same color on the same rank that is at least two squares away. This overrules the usual prohibition of moving a piece to a square that has a piece of the same color. Also, although a king may castle only with a rook on the same rank, the pieces need not be on the player's first rank.)
- The knight may move in a pattern of two spaces along one axis and then one space along another axis. It is not required to move through unobstructed squares when moving; it may "jump" past obstacles in the way, including missing boards.
- The pawn may move one space forward along one axis to a vacant square. Forward movement is considered to be in the upward direction, along the y-axis or the timeline axis. On the pawn's first move, it may move two spaces forward through two vacant squares along one axis. The pawn may capture onto an opponent's piece forward along either of the following sets of axes: the x- and y-axes, or the turn and timeline axes. When a pawn reaches its last rank, it is promoted to a queen; it cannot be promoted to any other piece. The en passant capture is permitted but not generalized across turns and timelines.

A player may make a move only on a board where it is their turn. A move is considered to be made on a board if the piece making the move begins and/or ends its move on that board. If a player makes a move on a board, then the resulting position is created as a new board, one half-turn to the right; the original board itself remains unchanged. The new board is on the opponent's turn. A board is outlined in the color of the player whose turn it is on that board.

A timeline consists of a series of boards in the same horizontal row. If a board is the latest board on its timeline, then the board is considered to be playable, indicated by a thick outline; otherwise, it is considered to be unplayable, indicated by a thin outline. A player may make a move only using a piece that stands on a playable board. If a piece's move occurs on a playable board, then the resulting new board is created on the same timeline.

A piece may travel through time using its movement abilities. If a player makes a move such that a piece travels to an unplayable board, then a new timeline is created in the direction of the player, downward from that player's perspective, in the vacant row closest to the originating timeline; the resulting new board is placed on the new timeline. A piece may move between timelines. When a piece travels between boards, only boards outlined in the player's color are considered; boards outlined in the opponent's color are ignored.

A timeline can be considered active or inactive. The original timeline is active. The nth timeline created by a certain player is active if the opponent has created at least n - 1 timelines. (In other words, given the order in which a timeline was created by a certain player, that timeline is active if the number of timelines created by the opponent is at least one less than that order.) All other timelines are inactive. Because of this, the maximum number of active timelines a player can have branched is one more than the number of timelines that the opponent has branched. An active timeline is shown with a purple arrow, whereas an inactive timeline is shown with an arrow in the color of the player who created it. An active board is a playable board on an active timeline.

The present line is a large vertical bar that always aligns itself with the active board which is the furthest left along the turn axis. The present line also touches every board in the same column as that board. Every board touched by the present line is considered to be in the present. On a player's turn, they must make moves until the present line shifts to being on their opponent's turn. The player may also optionally make moves on any playable board where it is their turn. The player may undo any moves made during their turn prior to the end of that turn. The player's moves are finalized and the turn is complete when the player submits their moves.

A player is in check in a situation where it is the player's turn and, if the player were to pass their move on all active boards in the present, then the opponent would be able to capture one of the player's kings. A player cannot take their turn in a way that would allow one of their kings to be captured. If the player whose turn it is has no way to legally complete their turn, then the game ends in one of two ways:

- If the player is in check, then they are in checkmate, and they lose.
- Otherwise, the game ends in a stalemate, resulting in a draw.

=== Variants ===
5D Chess has many variant modes. These can alter factors such as the starting position, the board size (square boards with side length 1 (Note: The 1×1 board appears only in a variant entitled Global Warming, vacant. Upon starting, the game instantaneously ends in stalemate.) and 3–8 are possible), the number of starting timelines, and so on. The game also has several fairy pieces, which move as follows:

- The unicorn may move any distance along exactly three axes equally.
- The dragon may move any distance along exactly four axes equally.
- The princess may move any distance along up to two axes equally.

When moving, the unicorn, dragon, and princess must move through a continuous series of unobstructed squares.

- The brawn has the movement and promotion abilities of the pawn. In addition, the brawn may capture one space along exactly two axes if it moves forward along at least one axis and does not move backward along any axis.
- The royal queen may move like a queen, and it is subject to check and checkmate.
- The common king may move one space along any number of axes, akin to a king with no royal powers.

Piece	Unicorn	Dragon	Princess	Royal Queen	Common King	Brawn
Symbols						

The game features a puzzle mode.

Turn Zero is a variant starting with a configuration in which there is an additional board for Black a half-turn earlier in the main timeline. The variant is often used in tournament play for balancing purposes.

== Release ==
The game was launched on 22 July 2020 on Steam. It was developed by Conor Petersen and Thunkspace. Petersen said that he had enjoyed chess variants such as three-dimensional chess and conceived of using time as an additional dimension for piece movements. He said, "From there, I tried to solve each problem or paradox I found".

== Reception ==
Kotaku reviewer Nathan Grayson called the game "remarkably elegant for what it is". Arne Kaehler of ChessBase wrote that while the game ran well and is a fun chess variant, the opponent AI was not very competent. A Digitally Downloaded reviewer wrote that, due to the increasing complexity of the game as turns pass, it presents a "limitless well of possibility". Christopher Livingston of PC Gamer called the game "mind-bending". Jacob Aron of New Scientist wrote that the game "isn't for the faint-hearted" and "is brain-meltingly hard".

Chess grandmaster Hikaru Nakamura played the game when appearing on VENN in August 2020, though he drew controversy from the 5D chess player community for refusing to read the rules of the game, and subsequently declaring that the game made no sense. Community tutorials for the game have been made.

The game of 5D Chess featured heavily in one round of the 2023 MIT Mystery Hunt, where a "5D Barred Diagramless [crossword puzzle] With Multiverse Time Travel" was presented.

== See also ==
- List of four-dimensional games
