= Four Dimensions =

Four Dimensions may refer to:

- Four Dimensions (Don Patterson album), 1968
- Four Dimensions (Lollipop F album), 2010

== See also ==
- Four Dimensions of Greta
- Fourth dimension (disambiguation)
- 4D (disambiguation)
