= D4 (film) =

- Directed by: Darrin Dickerson
- Written by: Darrin Dickerson
- Produced by: David B. Stevens
- Starring: Vicki Askew; Ella Bell; Eric Berner
- Cinematography: Jeremy Gonzales
- Edited by: Darrin Dickerson
- Music by: Nathan Whitehead
- Production company: Ghostwater Film
- Distributed by: Elephant Films
- Release date: June 7, 2010 (United States)
- Running time: 98 minutes
- Country: United States
- Language: English
- Budget: $35,000

D4 (or D4 Mortal Unit) is a 2010 horror film, directed and written by Darrin Dickerson. It stars Vicki Askew, Ella Bell and Eric Berner.

== Plot ==
D4 follows a team of special ops mercenaries on a mission to rescue a kidnapped kid believed to be held in an abandoned government facility. Hired by the boy's mother, a wealthy doctor with high reaching influence, all seems to be an easy job. But as things unfold, what was meant to be a simple search and rescue turns into a fight for survival.

== Cast ==
- Vicki Askew as Dr. Lark
- Ella Bell as Nurse #1
- Eric Berner as Sloan
- Clay Brocker as Brocker
- Erin Elizabeth Burns as Nurse #2
- Darrin Dickerson as Smoke
- Montana Dickerson as Dalton's Grandson
- Laine Dubroc as Little B
- Randall Edwards as Henchman
- Jeff Hime as Cutter
- Dan Kassis as Panel Member #2
- Ted LeGarde as Old Man Dalton
- Big Mike Ulm as Dr. Lark's mutated son
