= Fourth Dimension (Radiophonic album) =

Studio album by Paddy Kingsland
- Released: 1973
- Recorded: 1970–1973
- Genre: Electronic music
- Length: 27:39
- Label: BBC Records
- Producer: Desmond Briscoe

BBC Radiophonic Workshop chronology
BBC Radiophonic Music (1971)	Fourth Dimension (1973)	The Radiophonic Workshop (1975)

Fourth Dimension is a 1973 BBC Records release featuring recordings created by the BBC Radiophonic Workshop composer Paddy Kingsland. Although it was credited to "The BBC Radiophonic Workshop" it was the work of Kingsland alone, and was the first album of Workshop music to feature only one artist. It features theme tunes used by BBC radio and television. The music prominently features VCS 3 and "Delaware" Synthi 100 synthesisers, both from Electronic Music Studios (London) Ltd, with a standard rock-based session band providing backing. The track "Reg" featured as the B-side to the 1973 single release of the Doctor Who theme.

It was reissued as part of the Record Store Day exclusive 6-CD box set Four Albums 1968 - 1978 29 August 2020.

== Track listing ==
All tracks are written by Paddy Kingsland.

No.	Title	Composed for	Length
1.	"Scene and Heard"	BBC Radio 1
2.	"Just Love"	BBC TV
3.	"Vespucci"	BBC Schools
4.	"Reg"	BBC African Service
5.	"Tamariu"	BBC TV
6.	"One-Eighty-One"	BBC Radio 4
7.	"Fourth Dimension"	BBC Radio 4
8.	"Colour Radio"	BBC Radio Leeds
9.	"Take Another Look"	BBC TV
10.	"Kaleidoscope"	BBC Radio 4
11.	"The Space Between"	BBC Radio 3
12.	"Flashback"	BBC TV

Bonus tracks on Four Albums box set reissue
No.	Title	Composed for	Length
13.	"Rugby Special"	BBC TV
14.	"Willie Banks and the Administrative Machine"	BBC Radio 4
15.	"The Ramsbottom File"	BBC School Radio
