= Pennsylvania Railroad class D4 =

PRR D4
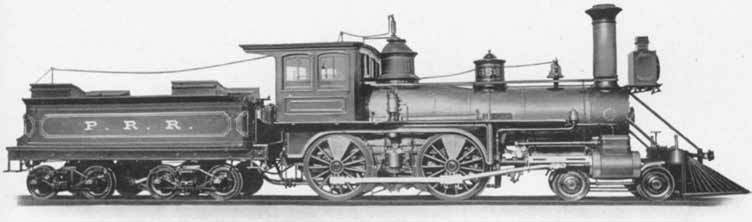
Type and origin
- Power type: Steam
- Builder: PRR Altoona shops
- Build date: 1873–1890
- Total produced: 37
Specifications
- Configuration
  - Whyte: 4-4-0
  - UIC: 2′B
- Gauge: 4 ft 8 1/2 in (1,435 mm)
- Leading dia.: 28 in (711 mm)
- Driver dia.: 62 in (1,575 mm)
- Wheelbase: 22 ft 5 5/8 in (6.848 m) (locomotive); 46 ft 10 1/8 in (14.278 m) (locomotive and tender)
- Length: 56 ft 3.94 in (17.1689 m)
- Height: 14 ft 5.96 in (4.4186 m)
- Adhesive weight: 56,200 lb (25.5 tonnes)
- Loco weight: 81,800 lb (37.1 tonnes)
- Tender weight: 51,400 lb (23.3 tonnes)
- Total weight: 133,200 lb (60.4 tonnes)
- Tender type: 8-wheel with water scoop
- Fuel type: Anthracite coal
- Fuel capacity: 12,000 lb (5.4 tonnes)
- Water cap.: 2,400 US gal (9,100 L; 2,000 imp gal)

The Pennsylvania Railroad's steam locomotive class D4 (formerly Class C (anthracite), pre-1895) comprised thirty-seven anthracite-burning 4-4-0 locomotives intended for general passenger and freight service on the PRR's New Jersey lines, constructed at the railroad's own Altoona Works (now owned by Norfolk Southern) during 1873–1890. They shared many parts with other standard classes.

This design differed from the Class C (later D3) mainly in its longer firebox to burn slower-burning anthracite coal. Like all the early standardized 4-4-0s on the PRR, the Class C (Anthracite) had a wagon-top boiler with steam dome and a firebox between the two driving axles.

In 1875, fifteen locomotives were either built or converted (sources differ) with 68-inch (1,727 mm) drivers for fast passenger service on the New Jersey lines. These were classified Class CA (Anthracite) or later D4a, and handled this traffic until 1881, when they were replaced by heavier power.
