= 4D SAS =

French software / database system company

- Formerly: ACI
- Company type: Private
- Founded: 1984; 41 years ago
- Founder: Laurent Ribardiere
- Headquarters: France
- Areas served: France & French-speaking Canada
- Key people: Laurent Ribardiere
- Products: 4D, Wakanda
- Brands: 4D Inc, Wakanda SAS
- Services: Software, Support, Professional Services
- Owner: Laurent Ribardiere
- Website: fr.4d.com

4D SAS is a French company owned by Laurent Ribardière. 4D has a US-based subsidiary 4D Inc. 4D was founded in 1984 when development began for Silver Surfer (early codename for 4D) and had its initial product release in 1987 with its own programming language. It is the developer and publisher of 4D (or 4th Dimension) and the original developer of Wakanda.
