= 4D Inc. =

4D Inc
- Formerly: ACI US
- Company type: Private
- Founded: 1984; 42 years ago in Cupertino, California, United States
- Founder: Laurent Ribardière
- Headquarters: 95 South Market Street Suite 240, San Jose, CA, USA
- Areas served: USA & English-speaking Canada
- Products: 4D
- Services: Software, Support, Professional Services
- Website: us.4d.com

4D Inc is a US-based subsidiary of 4D SAS and publisher of 4D. It was established in 1984 and initially led by Guy Kawasaki. 4D is the developer and publisher of 4D (or 4th Dimension). 4D was founded in 1984 when development began for Silver Surfer (early code-name for 4D) and had its initial product release in 1987 with its own programming language.

After 16 years of operating as ACIUS from 1984 to 2000, the name was officially changed to 4D Inc.

4D is also the original developer of Wakanda.
