= Miegakure =

Upcoming four-dimensional space indie video game platformer

- Developer: Marc ten Bosch
- Platforms: Linux; Mac OS X Windows (Steam)
- Genre: Puzzle-platform
- Mode: Single-player

Miegakure (Japanese: 見え隠れ, Hepburn: Miegakure; "in and out of sight") is an in-development puzzle-platform video game by Marc ten Bosch set in a world with four spatial dimensions. Because rendering true four-dimensional (4D) space to a screen is impossible, the game renders two-dimensional images (the screen) of three-dimensional (3D) slices of its world. Players can change the dimensions used to create the slice and move within the slice, thereby enabling them to move throughout the 4D world. The game has many puzzles that are impossible to solve in a 3D world, but are solvable in the game's 4D world.

In contrast to traditional 2D or 3D game development, virtually all of the technology behind Miegakure had to be created from scratch because the equations describing physics in a world with four spatial dimensions differ from those in spacetime (which has only three spatial dimensions). The technology underlying the game was used to create the 2017 simulation game 4D Toys, and some of the research underlying the game was published at SIGGRAPH in 2020. The game has been in development since 2009 and, as of January 2026, does not have a release date.

== Gameplay ==
Bosch has noted that the gameplay in Miegakure "focuses on exploring a 4D world and the consequences of being able to move in 4D." Some of these consequences include actions that are impossible in a 3D world, but which become possible in a 4D world. For example, taking objects from a locked safe without opening it. The game also has characters and a story.

== Development ==
In 2009, Bosch worked on prototype for the Experimental Gameplay Workshop at GDC 2009 which would be the basis for Miegakure. In 2010 the game's engine was written in C++, and the levels were scripted in Lua. The game was popularized in March 2010 by an xkcd webcomic, which compared the game to Edwin Abbott Abbott's book Flatland. On December 4, 2014, ahead of the PlayStation Experience event, the game was announced to be released on PlayStation 4 via the PlayStation Blog.The game was playable for attendees of the PlayStation Experience event in Las Vegas at the following weekend.

In 2015, Bosch said the game had around 140 levels, and each contains a unique idea. Indie Fund backed the game in April 2016. In 2017, Bosch released the simulation game 4D Toys for iOS and Steam VR. The game engine underlying 4D Toys was based on the technology developed for Miegakure, and borne out of tests to add a robust physics system to the game. Bosch said that working on 4D Toys influenced the design of Miegakure, noting "I also came up with many ideas for Miegakure levels and scenes while playing with 4D Toys."

Creating the game's physics engine involved generalizing Newton's laws of motion to an arbitrary number of dimensions, which required Bosch's team to come up with new mathematics. Part of the research was used to create the technical paper "N-Dimensional Rigid Body Dynamics", which Bosch presented at SIGGRAPH 2020 and published later that year.

The name of the game comes from a Japanese garden term, which Bosch chose because "the game's philosophy is connected to ideas Japanese gardens have developed." Bosch said that the simplicity of the color-switch mechanic in Ikaruga influenced the design of the dimension-orientation switching button in the game. Bosch went to Kyoto to study ancient temples for inspiration. Some of the concept art of the game was created by Kellan Jett.

The tremendous technical challenges of creating a 4D game engine mean that as of January 2026, the game is still in development with no announced release date. Bosch writes updates concerning the game in a dedicated development blog and on Patreon. In a Wired profile in 2014, Bosch described his daily schedule as "wake up, work on the game, go get lunch somewhere, work on the game, go to sleep."

== Awards ==
Miegakure won the Amazing award at IndieCade (the International Festival of Independent Games) in 2010.

== See also ==
- List of four-dimensional games
