= 4th Dimension (software) =

Relational database and programming language

4D Programming Language
- Designed by: Laurent Ribardière
- Developer: 4D SAS
- First appeared: 1984; 42 years ago (dev) 1987; 39 years ago (official)
- Stable release: v18 R5 / January 19, 2021; 5 years ago
- Preview release: v18 R6 Beta
- Implementation language: C, C++
- Platform: Cross-Platform
- OS: Windows, macOS
- License: Proprietary
- Filename extensions: 4DB, 4DC
- File formats: Interpreted, Compiled
- Website: us.4d.com

4D
- Original author: Laurent Ribardière
- Developer: 4D SAS
- Initial release: 1984; 42 years ago (ss) 1987; 39 years ago (v1)
- Stable release: v18 R5 / January 19, 2021; 5 years ago
- Preview release: v18 R6 Beta
- Written in: C++, C
- Operating system: Windows, Mac OS
- Type: RAD RDBMS IDE Language GUI Designer Web Server
- License: Proprietary
- Website: us.4d.com

4D Server
- Original author: Laurent Ribardière
- Developer: 4D SAS
- Initial release: 1993; 33 years ago (v1)
- Stable release: v18 R5 / January 19, 2021; 5 years ago
- Preview release: v18 R6 Beta
- Written in: C++, C
- Operating system: Windows, Mac OS
- Type: RDBMS Web Server Application Server SQL Server Database Server Language
- License: Proprietary
- Website: us.4d.com

4D (4th Dimension, or Silver Surfer, as it was known during early development) is a relational database management system and integrated development environment developed by Laurent Ribardière. 4D was created in 1984 and had a slightly delayed public release for Macintosh in 1987 with its own programming language.

The 4D product line has since expanded to an SQL back-end, integrated compiler, integration of PHP, and several productivity plug-ins and interfaces. Some of the plug-ins created by 4D include 4D Write (a word processor), 4D View (somewhat like a spreadsheet, but with extra functionality) and 4D Internet Commands (which allowed for the addition of Internet-related functionality to a database). There are also over 100 third-party plugins, free and commercial.

4D can also be used as a web server, to run compiled database applications.

Today, 4D is published by the French company 4D SAS and has a sales, distribution and support presence in most major markets, with the United States, the United Kingdom, and France being the primary markets. The product is localized in more than a dozen languages.

== History ==
Silver Surfer, as it was known during early development, was developed by Laurent Ribardière in 1984. Following negotiations with Ribardiere it was planned that Apple Inc. (formerly Apple Computer Inc) would publish the software but Apple canceled the plan, reportedly due to pressure from other potential database publishers who claimed that if Apple had their own "brand" database, third-party products would be disadvantaged in the marketplace. Apple tried at the time to ensure well-known software publishers supported the Macintosh platform, and as a result the project reverted to Laurent Ribardière, who with the French businesswoman Marylene Delbourg-Delphis published 4th Dimension. Although independently published, Apple supported the new venture and used 4D extensively throughout the organization for projects including fitness center management and CIM (Computer Integrated Manufacturing). A number of Apple personnel became 4D experts, including Lance McAndrew in Apple's Cupertino headquarters and Andrew O'Donoghue in Apple's Ireland-based European manufacturing headquarters, where a 4th Dimension application managed the European Service Center administration.

Over the next few years 4th Dimension's installed base grew, and the publisher ACI established a US-based subsidiary called ACIUS, initially led by Guy Kawasaki. After 16 years of operating as ACIUS up to 2000, the name was officially changed to 4D Inc.

In 1993, 4D Server v1.1, the client/server version of 4th Dimension was introduced along with the release of 4th Dimension v3.1.

In 1995, 4D v3.5 went cross-platform and has since then supported both the Microsoft Windows and Apple Macintosh operating systems.

In 1997, 4D v6 was the first version of 4D to contain a fully integrated web server, allowing developers to translate 4D forms into HTML on the fly using only the 4D language.

In 2004, 4D 2004 was the first version of 4D to allow developers to create standalone, client/server, web and Service Oriented Applications (SOA) without changing any code.

In 2008, 4D v11 added a SQL layer to the 4D database engine and extending native SQL in to the 4D programming language which allowed 4D developers to write native SQL code to connect to either local or remote servers.

In 2010, 4D v12 integrated the ability to execute PHP functions/scripts from within the 4D programming language. This version also supported new replication and synchronization commands and included a 64 bit version of 4D Server.

=== Version history ===
Branch	Latest version	Initial release	Final release	Status Feb 2022	Notes
v19.x	v19.LTS	12 Jul 2021	Ongoing	Supported	Native support for Apple Silicon, Classes
v18.x	v18.LTS	16 Jan 2020	Ongoing	Supported	Project Databases for Version Control, Built-in encryption tools, 4D for iOS, 4D Write Pro, 4D View Pro
v17.x	v17.4	10 July 2018	13 Dec 2020 (4D v17.5)	Support ended 13 Dec 2020	ORDA (Object Relational Data Access), Collections, Object Notation, Dynamic forms
v16.x	v16.6	10 Jan 2017	24 Jul 2019 (4D v16.6)	Support ended 24 July 2019	New Cache Management System, Preemptive Multithreading, 4D Dev Pro 64 bit
v15R	v15R5	10 Nov 2015	14 Sep 2016	Superseded by 16.x	Preview of features to be in v16.x
v15.x	v15.6	16 Jul 2015	25 Apr 2017	Support ended 25 Apr 2018	64 bit 4D Server for Mac servers; New network layer
v14R	v14R5	May 2014	March 2015	No longer supported	preview of features to be in v15.x
v14.x	v14.6	12 Dec 2013	20 Dec 2016	No longer supported	4D Mobile (Connectivity options for 4D Server as a datasource for Wakanda (software)); Structured JSON objects (C_Object); SQL views; new tools for maintenance and monitoring, new journaling system.
v13.x	v13.6	14 Feb 2012	18 Jun 2015	No longer supported	New multithreaded HTTP server; automatic session management; new extensible HTTP client; webkit integration and extended JavaScript support; enriched list box; external document management.
v12.x	v12.6	3 Jun 2010	8 Oct 2013	No longer supported	64 bit 4D Server for Windows servers; PHP integration; Synchronization and Replication
v11.x	v11.9	23 Sep 2008	7 Jul 2011	No longer supported	SQL engine; integrated maintenance center (MSC); SVG management; Integrated Web Area
2004.x	2004.8	31 Aug 2004	30 Jun 2009	No longer supported	Revamped interface; Integration of high-level ODBC commands, 4D Customizer, 4D Backup and 4D Engine
2003.x	2003.8r2	17 Mar 2003	11 Apr 2006	No longer supported	XML; Web Services; Embedded Compiler
v6.8.x	6.8.6	15 Apr 2002	24 Sep 2004	No longer supported	
v6.7.x	6.7.5			No longer supported	
v6.5.x		18 May 1999		No longer supported	
v6.0.x	6.0.5	1997	27 Feb 1998	No longer supported	Integrated Web Server
v3.x				No longer supported	4D v3.5 was the first cross-platform version (mac/win),
v1.x		1987		No longer supported	Mac only

== Architecture ==
A 4D application can run in either Standalone mode or Client-Server mode.

=== Single-User ===
In Standalone mode, the 4D application (4D.exe on Windows or 4D.app on Mac) is used to open the structure file (4DB/4DC) file directly along with the associated data file (4DD).

=== Client-Server ===
In the Client-Server paradigm the 4D Server application (4DServer.exe on Windows or 4DServer.app on Mac) is used to open the structure file (4DB/4DC) file directly along with the associated data file (4DD). 4D may then be used in remote mode to connect to the 4D Server.

== Application Editions ==
4D has two applications; 4D and 4D Server. 4D Server runs only as a server but 4D can be run in either standalone or remote mode.

=== 4D ===
4D can be run in two modes. 4D in single-user mode allows for 1 person to run the application. 4D in remote mode is used for connecting to a 4D Server.

=== 4D Server ===
4D Server is used for Client-Server connectivity to the application. In this mode, 4D Server loads the structure file (4DB or 4DC) and also the datafile (4DD) and provides network access to 4D (in remote). Each workstation has a dynamically updated cache of the resources they are working with, while the 4D Server maintains the data and code.

== Syntax ==
This section will include syntax examples, demonstrating different programming constructs used in 4D, such as for loops and variable usage.

=== Data Types ===
4D fields, variables, and expressions can be of the following data types:

Data Type	Field	Variable	Expression
String	Yes	Yes	Yes
Number (double)	Yes	Yes	Yes
Date	Yes	Yes	Yes
Time	Yes	Yes	Yes
Boolean	Yes	Yes	Yes
Picture	Yes	Yes	Yes
Pointer	No	Yes	Yes
BLOB	Yes	Yes	No
Array	No	Yes	No
Integer 64 bits	Yes	No	No
Float	Yes	No	No
Object	Yes	Yes	Yes
Collection	Yes	Yes	Yes
Undefined	No	Yes	Yes

More info on 4D data type can be found on the [ 4D Data Types] documentation page

=== Variable Scope ===
Local variables are prefixed with a $ like $myLocalVariable and only live for the duration of the method.

Process variables have no prefix like myProcessVariable and live throughout the duration of the process.

Inter-process (or Global) variables are prefixed with a <> like <>myGlobalVariable and live throughout the duration of the application.

=== Comparison of looping ===
==== For ====
For(vCounter;1;100)
  // Do something
End for

==== While ====
 $i :=1 // Initialize the counter
 While($i<=100) // Loop 100 times
  // Do something
    $i :=$i +1 // Need to increment the counter
 End while

==== Repeat ====
 $i :=1 // Initialize the counter
 Repeat
  // Do something
    $i :=$i +1 // Need to increment the counter
 Until($i=100) // Loop 100 times

==== Nested Loops ====
The following example goes through all the elements of a two-dimensional array:

 For($vlElem;1;Size of array(anArray))
  // ...
  // Do something with the row
  // ...
    For($vlSubElem;1;Size of array(anArray{$vlElem}))
       // Do something with the element
       anArray{$vlElem}{$vlSubElem}:=...
    End for
 End for

The following example builds an array of pointers to all the date fields present in the database:

 ARRAY POINTER($apDateFields;0)
 $vlElem:=0
 For($vlTable;1;Get last table number)
   // loop over each table number with $vTable as the number
    If(Is table number valid($vlTable))
      // check if table number $vTable is valid
      // only loop on the valid table
       For($vlField;1;Get last field number($vlTable))
         // loop over each field number within current table
         // with $vlField as the current field number
          If(Is field number valid($vlTable;$vlField))
            // check if field number is valid
             $vpField:=Field($vlTable;$vlField) // get pointer to field
             If(Type($vpField->)=Is date)
               // check if current field is a date
               // only performs these actions if field is a date
                $vlElem:=$vlElem+1
                INSERT IN ARRAY($apDateFields;$vlElem)
                $apDateFields{$vlElem}:=$vpField
             End if
          End If
       End for
    End If
 End for
